= Krasnokholmsky District =

Krasnokholmsky District Краснохолмский район (Russian)
- District
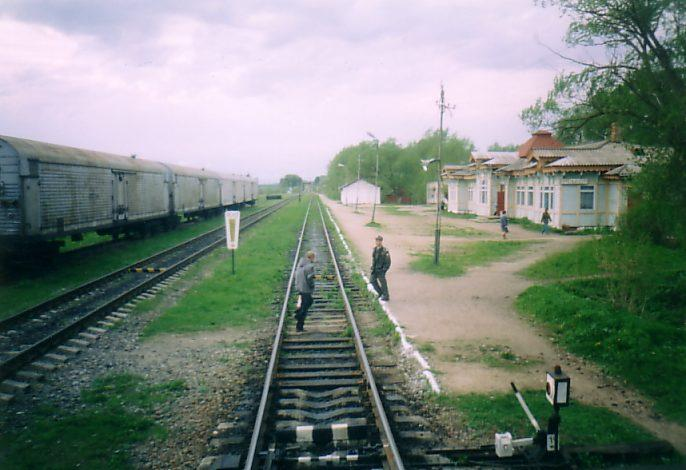
- Train station in Krasny Kholm

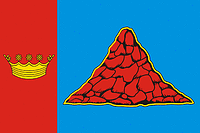
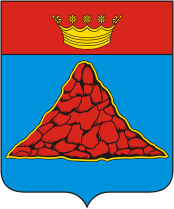
- Flag Coat of arms
- Location of Krasnokholmsky District in Tver Oblast
- Coordinates: 58°03′58″N 37°07′16″E
- Country: Russia
- Federal subject: Tver Oblast
- Established: 12 July 1929
- Administrative center: Krasny Kholm

Area
  - Total: 1,495 km^{2} (577 sq mi)

Population (2010 Census)
  - Total: 11,835
  - Density: 7.916/km^{2} (20.50/sq mi)
  - Urban: 47.4%
  - Rural: 52.6%

Administrative structure
  - Administrative divisions: 1 Urban settlements, 3 Rural settlements
  - Inhabited localities: 1 cities/towns, 206 rural localities

Municipal structure
  - Municipally incorporated as: Krasnokholmsky Municipal District
  - Municipal divisions: 1 urban settlements, 3 rural settlements
- Time zone: UTC+3 (MSK)
- OKTMO ID: 28632000
- Website: http://krholm.ru/

Krasnokholmsky District (Russian: Краснохо́лмский райо́н) is an administrative and municipal district (raion), one of the thirty-six in Tver Oblast, Russia. It is located in the northeast of the oblast and borders with Vesyegonsky District in the north, Breytovsky District of Yaroslavl Oblast in the northeast, Nekouzsky District, also of Yaroslavl Oblast, in the southeast, Sonkovsky District in the south, Bezhetsky District in the southwest, and with Molokovsky District in the northwest. The area of the district is 1,495 square kilometers (577 sq mi). Its administrative center is the town of Krasny Kholm. Population: 11,835 (2010 Census); 14,736 (2002 census); 18,813 (1989 Soviet census). The population of Krasny Kholm accounts for 47.4% of the district's total population.

== Geography ==
The whole of the district belongs to the basin of the Rybinsk Reservoir. The rivers in the west of the district drain into the Mogocha, which joins the Melecha outside of the district to form the Osen, a major right tributary of the Mologa. The source of the Mogocha is located within the district. The rivers in the east of the district drain into the Rybinsk Reservoir and its tributaries, including the Sit. Much of the district's territory is covered by forests.

== History ==
Krasny Kholm was first mentioned in the beginning of the 16th century as Spas na Kholmu. At the time, the area already belonged to the Grand Duchy of Moscow. During the Time of Troubles, it was badly damaged by Polish troops.

In the course of the administrative reform carried out in 1708 by Peter the Great, the territory was included into Ingermanland Governorate (known since 1710 as Saint Petersburg Governorate), but in 1727 it was transferred to Moscow Governorate. In 1775, Tver Viceroyalty was formed from the lands which previously belonged to Moscow and Novgorod Governorates, and in 1776, Krasnokholmsky Uyezd was established as a part of Tver Viceroyalty. Krasny Kholm was granted town status. In 1796, the viceroyalty was transformed into Tver Governorate and Krasnokholmsky Uyezd was abolished, the territory was transferred to Bezhetsky Uyezd. In 1803, Vesyegonsky Uyezd was re-established and Krasny Kholm with the surrounding territory was included into Vesyegonsky Uyezd. On March 10, 1918, Krasnokholmsky Uyezd was re-established. On April 25, 1921, Krasnokholmsky Uyezd was transferred to newly established Rybinsk Governorate. On February 15, 1923, Rybinsk Governorate was abolished and the uyezd was transferred back to Tver Governorate. On March 3, 1924, Krasnokholmsky Uyezd was abolished and split between Bezhetsky and Vesyegonsky Uyezds.

On July 12, 1929, the governorates and uyezds were abolished. Krasnokholmsky District, with the administrative center in the town of Krasny Kholm, was established within Bezhetsk Okrug of Moscow Oblast. It was established on the territories which previously belonged to Bezhetsky and Vesyegonsky Uyezds. On July 23, 1930, the okrugs were abolished and the districts were directly subordinated to the oblast. On January 29, 1935, Kalinin Oblast was established and Krasnokholmsky District was transferred to it. In 1990, Kalinin Oblast was renamed Tver Oblast.

On March 5, 1935, Ovinishchensky District with the administrative center in the selo of Kesma was established on the territories which previously belonged to Vesyegonsky and Krasnokholmsky Districts. On July 4, 1956, the district was abolished and split between Vesyegonsky and Krasnokholmsky Districts.

== Economy ==
=== Industry ===
The main industrial enterprise in the district is Krasny Kholm Electromechanical Plant. There are enterprises of timber, textile, and food industries as well.

=== Agriculture ===
The main agricultural specializations in the district are cattle breeding with meat and milk production, as well as vegetables and potato growing.

=== Transportation ===
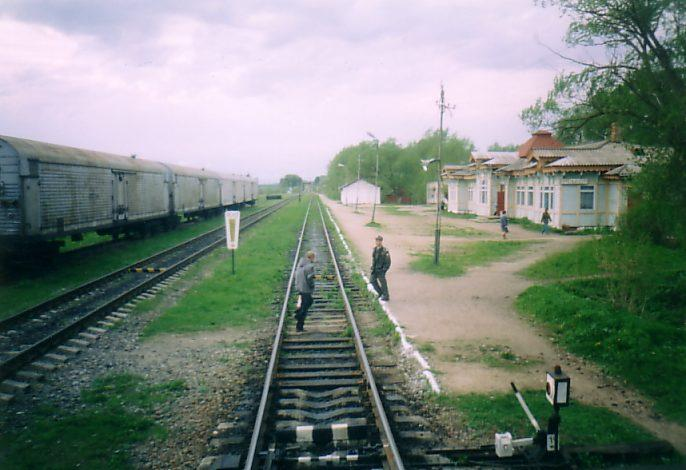
Krasny Kholm railway station

A railway connecting Moscow and Mga via Sonkovo and Pestovo crosses the district from south to north. The main railway station is in Krasny Kholm.

Krasny Kholm is connected by roads with Ustyuzhna via Vesyegonsk, with Tver via Bezhetsk, and with Sandovo via Molokovo. There are also local roads. There is bus traffic originating from Krasny Kholm.

== Culture and recreation ==
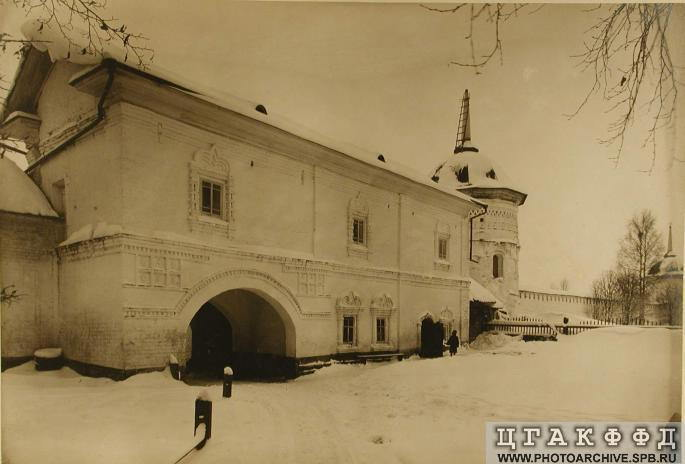
Antoniyev Krasnokholmsky Monastery in the beginning of the 20th century

The district contains fifteen cultural heritage monuments of federal significance (thirteen of them in Krasny Kholm) and additionally sixty-two objects classified as cultural and historical heritage of local significance (forty of them in Krasny Kholm). The federal monuments include the Dormition Church in the selo of Rachevo, the Nativity Church in the village of Rychmanovo, and the buildings of the Antoniyev Krasnokholmsky Monastery in Krasny Kholm.

Krasnokholmsky District Museum, located in Krasny Holm, was established in 1964. It has expositions on local history.
