= Sandovsky District =

Sandovsky District Сандовский район (Russian)
- District
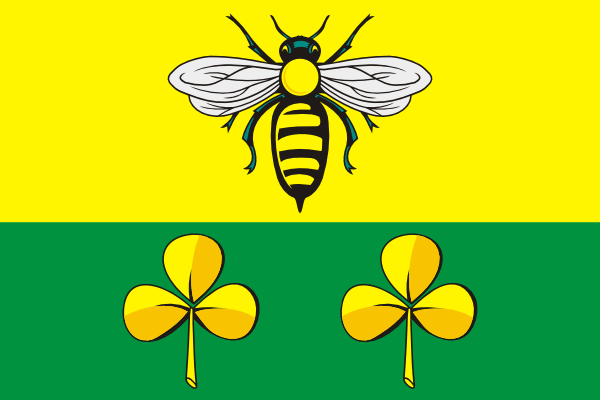
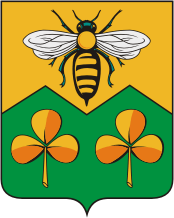
- Flag Coat of arms
- Location of Sandovsky District in Tver Oblast
- Coordinates: 58°27′N 36°24′E
- Country: Russia
- Federal subject: Tver Oblast
- Established: 1929
- Administrative center: Sandovo

Area
  - Total: 1,608 km^{2} (621 sq mi)

Population (2010 Census)
  - Total: 6,811
  - Density: 4.236/km^{2} (10.97/sq mi)
  - Urban: 51.5%
  - Rural: 48.5%

Administrative structure
  - Administrative divisions: 1 Urban settlements, 4 Rural settlements
  - Inhabited localities: 1 urban-type settlements, 215 rural localities

Municipal structure
  - Municipally incorporated as: Sandovsky Municipal District
  - Municipal divisions: 1 urban settlements, 4 rural settlements
- Time zone: UTC+3 (MSK)
- OKTMO ID: 28649000
- Website: http://www.sandovoregion.ru/

Sandovsky District (Russian: Са́ндовский райо́н) is an administrative and municipal district (raion), one of the thirty-six in Tver Oblast, Russia. It is located in the northeast of the oblast and borders with Ustyuzhensky District of Vologda Oblast in the north, Vesyegonsky District in the northeast, Molokovsky District in the southeast, Maksatikhinsky District in the south, Lesnoy District in the west, and with Pestovsky District of Novgorod Oblast in the northwest. The area of the district is 1,608 square kilometers (621 sq mi). Its administrative center is the urban locality (an urban-type settlement) of Sandovo. Population: 6,811 (2010 Census); 9,385 (2002 census); 12,495 (1989 Soviet census). The population of Sandovo accounts for 51.5% of the district's total population.

== Geography ==
The district lies fully in the basin of the Mologa River. The Mologa itself flows at the western border of the district, separating it from Lesnoy District. Rivers in the north and the west of the district drain directly into the Mologa, whereas rivers in the south and in the center of the district drain into the Melecha, which together with the Mogocha forms the Osen, a right tributary of the Mologa. The source of the Melecha lies within the district. Most of the district is covered by forests.

== History ==
In the Medieval times, the territory of the modern district was populated with the Finnish peoples and later it was dependent on the Novgorod Republic. In the end of the 15th century, together with Novgorod, it was annexed by the Grand Duchy of Moscow and was a part of Bezhetsk pyatina, one of five pyatinas Novgorod was administratively divided into. Under Vasily II, some of the lands were given to Stanislaw Melecki, a Polish noble converted to Russian Orthodox church.

In the course of the administrative reform carried out in 1708 by Peter the Great, the area was included into Ingermanland Governorate (known since 1710 as Saint Petersburg Governorate), but in 1727 it was transferred to Moscow Governorate. In 1775, Tver Viceroyalty was formed from the lands which previously belonged to Moscow and Novgorod Governorates, and in 1776, Vesyegonsky Uyezd was established as a part of Tver Viceroyalty. Vesyegonsk was granted town rights. In 1796, the viceroyalty was transformed into Tver Governorate and Vesyegonsky Uyezd was abolished; the territory was transferred to Bezhetsky Uyezd. In 1803, it was re-established. On April 25, 1921, Vesyegonsky Uyezd was transferred to newly established Rybinsk Governorate. On February 15, 1923, Rybinsk Governorate was abolished and the uyezd was transferred back to Tver Governorate.

On July 12, 1929, the governorates and uyezds were abolished. Sandovsky District, with the administrative center in the selo of Sandovo, was established within Bezhetsk Okrug of Moscow Oblast. On July 23, 1930, the okrugs were abolished and the districts were directly subordinated to the oblast. In 1932, the administrative center of the district was transferred to the village of Orudovo near Sandovo railway station, which eventually grew up into the settlement of Sandovo. On January 29, 1935, Kalinin Oblast was established and Sandovsky District was transferred to it. In February 1963, during the abortive administrative reform by Nikita Khrushchev, Sandovsky District was merged into Vesyegonsky District, but in January 1965 it was re-established. In 1967, Sandovo was granted urban-type settlement status. In 1990, Kalinin Oblast was renamed Tver Oblast.

== Economy ==
=== Industry ===
The district has enterprises of timber and food industries.

=== Agriculture ===
The main agricultural specializations in the district are cattle breeding with meat and milk production, as well as flax, vegetables, and potato growing. The agriculture is in deep crisis, with only one mid-size farm being profitable.

=== Transportation ===
A railway connecting Moscow and Mga via Sonkovo and Pestovo crosses the district from southeast to northwest. The major railway station is Sandovo.

Sandovo is connected by road with Krasny Kholm via Molokovo. Gravel roads run to Vesyegonsk and Ustyuzhna. There are also local roads, with bus traffic originating from Sandovo.

== Culture and recreation ==
The district contains nineteen cultural heritage monuments of federal significance and additionally eighteen objects classified as cultural and historical heritage of local significance. The federal monuments include three estates, in the villages of Ladozhskoye, Tukhani, and Yuryevo.

In Sandovo, there is a Bee Museum, which shows materials related to beekeeping, a traditional occupation of local peasants. The museum was opened in 2007.
