= Mogocha (river) =

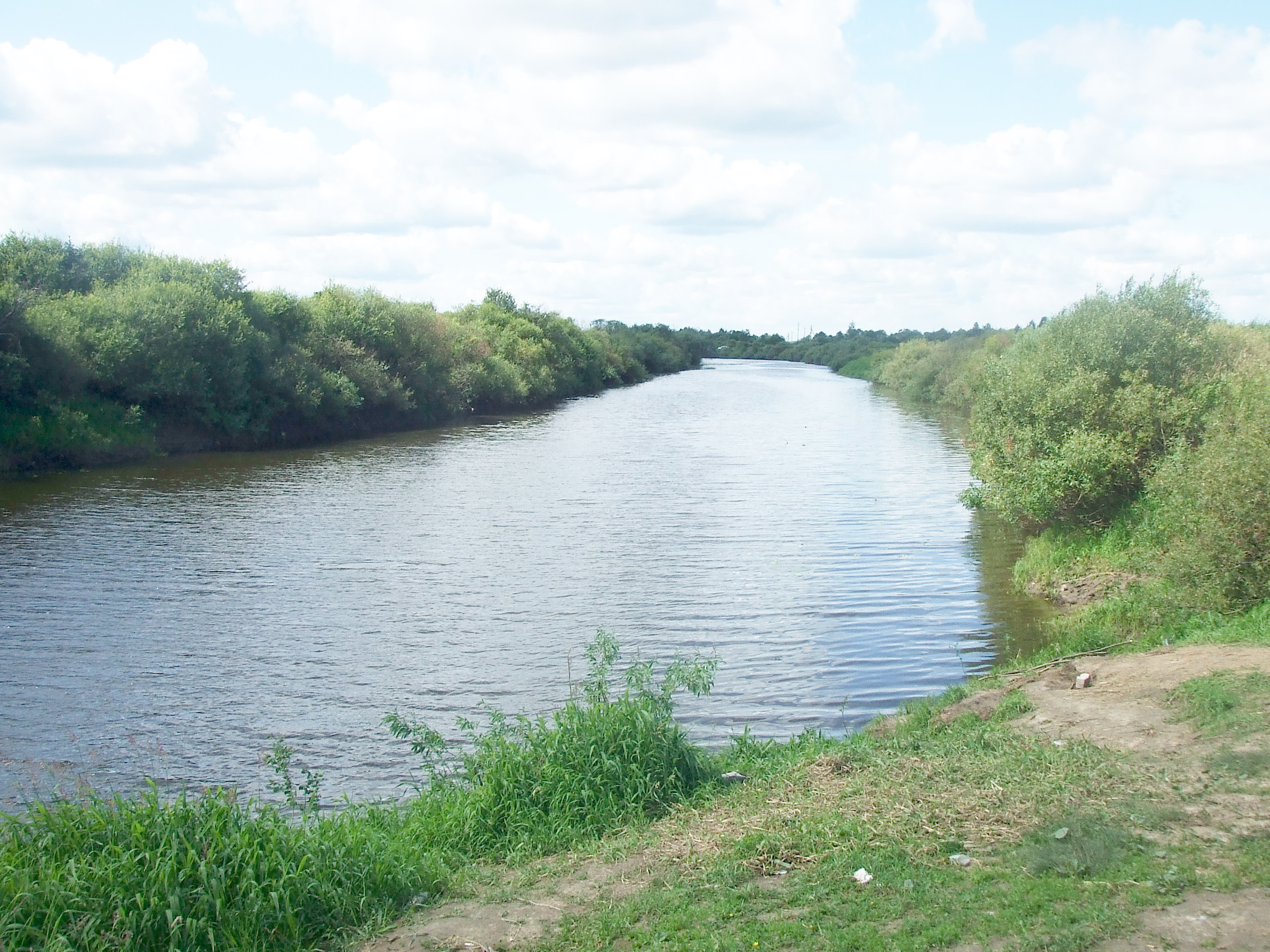

- Map of the Rybinsk Reservoir basin. The Mogocha is shown on the map.
- Native name: Могоча (Russian)

Location
- Country: Russia

Physical characteristics
- Mouth: Osen
  - coordinates: 57°59′28″N 36°25′22″E
- Length: 106 km (66 mi)
- Basin size: 1,880 km^{2} (730 mi^{2})

Basin features
- Progression: Osen→ Mologa→ Volga→ Caspian Sea

The Mogocha (Russian: Могоча) is a river in Krasnokholmsky, Molokovsky, and Bezhetsky Districts of Tver Oblast in Russia. Together with the Melecha, it forms the Osen, a major right tributary of the Mologa. It is 106 kilometres (66 mi) long, and the area of its basin is 1,880 square kilometres (730 sq mi). The principal tributaries of the Mogocha are the Uyvesh (left) and the Loyka (right).

The source of the Mogocha is located in the south of Krasnokholmsky District, close to the village of Gorka. The river flows north and runs several kilometers west of the town of Krasny Kholm, turns northwest and enters Molokovsky District. There, it accepts the Loyka from the right and gradually turns southwest. The mouth of the Mogocha is in Bezhetsky District, close to the village of Pereuz.

The drainage basin of the Mogocha includes the western part of Krasnokholmsky District, the eastern part of Molokovsky District, the northwestern part of Sonkovsky District, as well as the northeastern part of Bezhetsky District. The town of Krasny Kholm lies in the basin of the Mogocha.
