= Melecha =

- Map of the Rybinsk Reservoir basin. The Melecha is shown on the map.
- Native name: Мелеча (Russian)

Location
- Country: Russia

Physical characteristics
- Mouth: Osen
  - coordinates: 57°59′28″N 36°25′22″E
- Length: 95 km (59 mi)
- Basin size: 1,310 km^{2} (510 mi^{2})

Basin features
- Progression: Osen→ Mologa→ Volga→ Caspian Sea

The Melecha (Russian: Мелеча) is a river in Sandovsky, Molokovsky, and Bezhetsky Districts of Tver Oblast in Russia. Together with the Mogocha, it forms the Osen, a major right tributary of the Mologa. It is 95 kilometres (59 mi) long, and the area of its basin is 1,310 square kilometres (510 sq mi). The principal tributary is the Belaya (left).

The source of the Melecha is located south of the selo of Staroye Sandovo in Sandovsky District. The river flows southwest, reaches Molokovsky District, and turns east forming the border between the districts. Further east, it departs south from the border, turns west, turns south, crosses into Bezhetsky District and joins the Mogocha to form the Osen southwest of the village of Pereuz.

The drainage basin of the Melecha includes the southeastern part of Sandovsky District, the western half of Molokovsky District, the north of Bezhetsky District, as well as minor areas in the south of Vesyegonsky District. The urban-type settlement of Molokovo lies in the drainage basin of the Melecha.
