= Osen (river) =

- Map of the Rybinsk Reservoir basin. The Osen is shown on the map as a stretch between the Melecha and the Mologa.
- Native name: Осень (Russian)

Location
- Country: Russia

Physical characteristics
- Mouth
  - location: Mologa
  - coordinates: 57°56′09″N 36°22′01″E
- Length: 8.7 km (5 mi)
- Basin size: 3,210 km^{2} (1,240 mi^{2})

Basin features
- Progression: Mologa→ Volga→ Caspian Sea
- Tributaries
  - left: Mogocha
  - right: Melecha

The Osen (Russian: Осень) is a river in Bezhetsky District of Tver Oblast in Russia. It is a major right tributary of the Mologa. It is 8.7 kilometres (5.4 mi) long, and the area of its basin is 3,210 square kilometres (1,240 sq mi).

The source of the Osen is located in Tver Oblast, close to the village of Pereuz. The Osen is formed by the confluence of two rivers, the Mogocha and the Melecha, both of which are about 100 kilometres (62 mi) long. The Osen flows southwest and joins the Mologa at the village of Yeski.

Despite the short length, the Osen has a rather big drainage area. It includes almost all of Molokovsky District, the southern half of Sandovsky District, the northern and the western parts of Bezhetsky District, and the southern half of Krasnokholmsky District, as well as minor areas in Vesyegonsky and Sonkovsky districts. The town of Krasny Kholm and the urban-type settlement of Molokovo lie in the drainage basin of the Osen.
