= Molokovsky District =

Molokovsky District Молоковский район (Russian)
- District
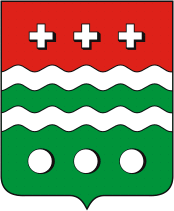
- Flag Coat of arms
- Location of Molokovsky District in Tver Oblast
- Coordinates: 58°10′N 36°46′E
- Country: Russia
- Federal subject: Tver Oblast
- Established: 12 July 1929
- Administrative center: Molokovo

Area
  - Total: 1,182.6 km^{2} (456.6 sq mi)

Population (2010 Census)
  - Total: 5,235
  - Density: 4.427/km^{2} (11.47/sq mi)
  - Urban: 44.5%
  - Rural: 55.5%

Administrative structure
  - Administrative divisions: 1 Urban settlements, 5 Rural settlements
  - Inhabited localities: 1 urban-type settlements, 183 rural localities

Municipal structure
  - Municipally incorporated as: Molokovsky Municipal District
  - Municipal divisions: 1 urban settlements, 5 rural settlements
- Time zone: UTC+3 (MSK)
- OKTMO ID: 28642000
- Website: http://www.molokovoadm.ru/

Molokovsky District (Russian: Молоко́вский райо́н) is an administrative and municipal district (raion), one of the thirty-six in Tver Oblast, Russia. It is located in the northeast of the oblast and borders with Sandovsky District in the north, Vesyegonsky District in the northeast, Krasnokholmsky District in the east, Bezhetsky District in the south, and with Maksatikhinsky District in the west. The area of the district is 1,182.6 square kilometers (456.6 sq mi). Its administrative center is the urban locality (an urban-type settlement) of Molokovo. Population: 5,235 (2010 Census); 7,015 (2002 census); 8,931 (1989 Soviet census). The population of Molokovo accounts for 44.5% of the district's total population.

== Geography ==
The whole area of the district belongs to the drainage basin of the Mologa River, a major tributary of the Volga. The major rivers within the district are the Melecha and the Mogocha, which cross it from northeast to southwest. Outside the district, they join to form the Osen, a major right tributary of the Mologa. Minor areas in the northwest of the district belong to the drainage basin of the Ratynya, another right tributary of the Mologa. Much of the area of the district is covered by forests.

== History ==
The area of the district was originally populated by Finnic peoples. In the 12th century, the area was in the periphery of the Novgorod Republic, which in the 15th century was annexed by Moscow as well. Molokovo was first mentioned in written documents in 1568. In the course of the administrative reform carried out in 1708 by Peter the Great, the area was included into Ingermanland Governorate (known since 1710 as Saint Petersburg Governorate), but in 1727 it was transferred to Moscow Governorate. In 1775, Tver Viceroyalty was formed from the lands which previously belonged to Moscow and Novgorod Governorates. The area was a part of Bezhetsky Uyezd of Tver Viceroyalty, from 1796 of Tver Governorate.

On July 12, 1929 the governorates and uyezds were abolished. Molokovsky District, with the administrative center in the selo of Molokovo, was established within Bezhetsk Okrug of Moscow Oblast. On July 23, 1930, the okrugs were abolished, and the districts were directly subordinated to the oblast. On January 29, 1935 Kalinin Oblast was established, and Molokovsky District was transferred to Kalinin Oblast. In February 1963, during the abortive Khrushchyov administrative reform, Molokovsky District was merged into Krasnokholmsky District, but on December 30, 1966 it was re-established. In 1987, Molokovo was granted urban-type settlement status. In 1990, Kalinin Oblast was renamed Tver Oblast.

== Economy ==
=== Industry ===
There are enterprises of timber and food (in particular, cheese production) industries in the district.

=== Agriculture ===
The main specializations of agriculture in the district are cattle breeding with meat and milk production, and crops and potato growing. As of 2011, there was one farm in the district growing flax.

=== Transportation ===
The railway connecting Moscow with Mga via Krasny Kholm and Sandovo, runs over the area of the district for about a kilometer in its eastern part, but there are no railway stations within the district.

Molokovo is connected by road with Krasny Kholm and with Sandovo. There are also local roads.

== Culture and recreation ==
The district contains seven objects classified as cultural and historical heritage of local significance. These include four churches built in the beginning of the 19th century (the Resurrection Church in the village of Beloye, the Dormition Church in the village of Vvedenye, the Church of Our Saviour in the selo of Deledino, and the Ascencion Church in the village of Novokotovo).

In 2003, a regional museum was opened in Molokovo. The museum is named after Nikolai Ogarkov, Marshal of the Soviet Union, who was born in Molokovo, and presents expositions about Ogarkov.
