= Lesnoy District =

Lesnoy District Лесной район (Russian)
- District
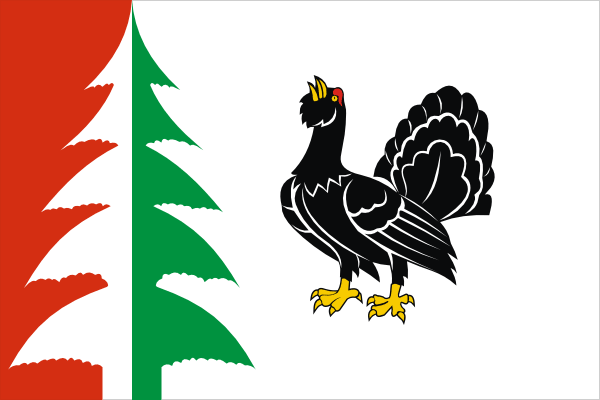
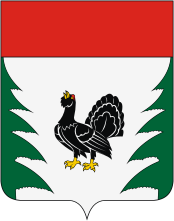
- Flag Coat of arms
- Location of Lesnoy District in Tver Oblast
- Coordinates: 58°16′58″N 35°31′16″E
- Country: Russia
- Federal subject: Tver Oblast
- Established: 12 July 1929
- Administrative center: Lesnoye

Area
  - Total: 1,633 km^{2} (631 sq mi)

Population (2010 Census)
  - Total: 5,252
  - Density: 3.216/km^{2} (8.330/sq mi)
  - Urban: 0%
  - Rural: 100%

Administrative structure
  - Administrative divisions: 4 Rural settlements
  - Inhabited localities: 144 rural localities

Municipal structure
  - Municipally incorporated as: Lesnoy Municipal District
  - Municipal divisions: 0 urban settlements, 4 rural settlements
- Time zone: UTC+3 (MSK)
- OKTMO ID: 28636000
- Website: http://лесной-район.рф/

Lesnoy District (Russian: Лесно́й райо́н) is an administrative and municipal district (raion), one of the thirty-six in Tver Oblast, Russia. It is located in the northeast of the oblast and borders with Pestovsky District of Novgorod Oblast in the north, Sandovsky District in the east, Maksatikhinsky District in the south, Udomelsky District in the southwest, and with Moshenskoy District of Novgorod Oblast in the northwest. The area of the district is 1,633 square kilometers (631 sq mi). Its administrative center is the rural locality (a selo) of Lesnoye. Population: 5,252 (2010 Census); 6,833 (2002 census); 8,177 (1989 Soviet census). The population of Lesnoye accounts for 31.7% of the district's total population.

== Geography ==
The whole area of the district belongs to the drainage basin of the Mologa River, a major tributary of the Rybinsk Reservoir. The Mologa crosses the eastern part of the district from south to north, and stretches of its course form the boundary between Lesnoy District and Maksatikhinsky and Sandovsky Districts. The principal tributaries of the Mologa within the district are the Keza and the Saragozha. 65% of the district area is covered by forests.

== History ==
The area of the district was originally populated by the Finnic peoples, in the 11th century, Slavs started to arrive. In the 13th century, the town of Ilovl (Ilov) was located in the area, which belonged to the Novgorod Republic. The town was presumably destroyed by Mongols. In the 15th century, together with Novgorod, the area was annexed by the Grand Duchy of Moscow. It belonged to Bezhetsk Pyatina, one of the five pyatinas into which Novgorod lands were divided.

In the course of the administrative reform carried out in 1708 by Peter the Great, the area was included into Ingermanland Governorate (known since 1710 as Saint Petersburg Governorate), but in 1727 it was transferred to Moscow Governorate. In 1775, Tver Viceroyalty was formed from the lands which previously belonged to Moscow and Novgorod Governorates, and in 1776 Vesyegonsky Uyezd was established as a part of Tver Viceroyalty. In 1796, the viceroyalty was transformed into Tver Governorate, and Vesyegonsky Uyezd was abolished, the area was moved to Bezhetsky Uyezd. In 1803, the uyezd was re-established. The area was split between three volosts of Vesyegonsky Uyezd, Nikolskaya, Mikhaylovskaya, and Lopatinskaya Volosts. On April 25, 1921, Vesyegonsky Uyezd was transferred to newly established Rybinsk Governorate. In 1922, part of the area was transferred to Vyshnevolotsky Uyezd of Tver Governorate. On February 15, 1923, Rybinsk Governorate was abolished, and Vesyegonsky uyezd was transferred back to Tver Governorate.

On July 12, 1929 the governorates and uyezds were abolished. Mikhaylovsky District, with the administrative center in the selo of Smerdyn, was established within Bezhetsk Okrug of Moscow Oblast. On July 23, 1930, the okrugs were abolished, and the districts were directly subordinated to the oblast. On December 25, 1930 Smerdyn was renamed Lesnoye, and Mikhaylovsky District was renamed Lesnoy District. On January 29, 1935 Kalinin Oblast was established, and Lesnoy District was transferred to Kalinin Oblast. In February 1963, during the abortive administrative reform by Nikita Khrushchev, Lesnoy District was merged into Maksatikhinsky District, but on December 30, 1966 it was re-established. In 1990, Kalinin Oblast was renamed Tver Oblast.

== Economy ==
=== Industry ===
There are enterprises of timber and food industries in the district.

=== Agriculture ===
The main agricultural specialization of the district is cattle breeding with meat and milk production.

=== Transportation ===
Lesnoye is connected by road with Maksatikha. There are some local roads, however, there are no roads which connect the district and Novgorod Oblast.

None of the rivers in the district are navigable.

== Culture and recreation ==
The district contains seven cultural heritage monuments of federal significance and additionally twenty-four objects classified as cultural and historical heritage of local significance. The federal monuments include the complex of the Ascencion Church (1749) in the selo of Mikhaylovskoye, the tomb of Lieutenant Dmitry Ilyin, a participant of the Battle of Chesma, in the village of Zastizhye, as well as a number of archeological sites.
