= Vesyegonsky District =

Vesyegonsky District Весьегонский район (Russian)
- District
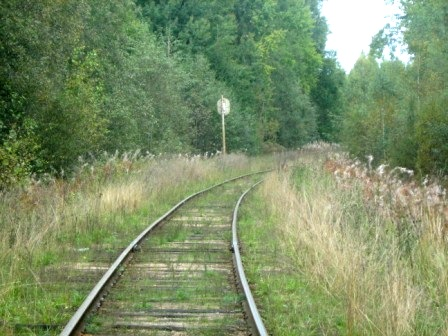
- Ovinishchi–Vesyegonsk railway in Vesyegonsky District

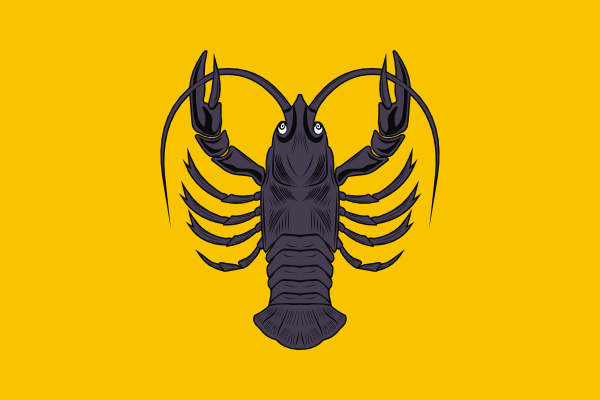
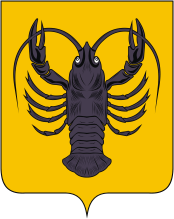
- Flag Coat of arms
- Location of Vesyegonsky District in Tver Oblast
- Coordinates: 58°39′N 37°16′E
- Country: Russia
- Federal subject: Tver Oblast
- Established: 12 July 1929
- Administrative center: Vesyegonsk

Area
  - Total: 2,047 km^{2} (790 sq mi)

Population (2010 Census)
  - Total: 13,481
  - Density: 6.586/km^{2} (17.06/sq mi)
  - Urban: 54.4%
  - Rural: 45.6%

Administrative structure
  - Administrative divisions: 1 Urban settlements, 7 Rural settlements
  - Inhabited localities: 1 cities/towns, 263 rural localities

Municipal structure
  - Municipally incorporated as: Vesyegonsky Municipal District
  - Municipal divisions: 1 urban settlements, 7 rural settlements
- Website: http://vesegonsk.ru/

Vesyegonsky District (Russian: Весьего́нский райо́н) is an administrative and municipal district (raion), one of the thirty-six in Tver Oblast, Russia. It is located in the northeast of the oblast and borders Cherepovetsky District of Vologda Oblast in the northeast, Breytovsky District of Yaroslavl Oblast in the southeast, Krasnokholmsky District in the south, Molokovsky District in the southwest, Sandovsky District in the west, and Ustyuzhensky District of Vologda Oblast in the northwest. The area of the district is 2,047 square kilometers (790 sq mi). Its administrative center is the town of Vesyegonsk. Population: 13,481 (2010 census); 16,517 (2002 census); 19,879 (1989 Soviet census). The population of Vesyegonsk accounts for 54.4% of the district's total population.

== Geography ==
The whole area of the district is flatland adjacent on the west to the Rybinsk Reservoir, which was filled in the 1940s and submerged the lower course of the Mologa River, a major tributary of the Volga River. The Mologa forms the northeastern border of the district, and rivers throughout the district drain into the Mologa or formerly drained into the Mologa and now drain into the Rybinsk Revservoir. The largest tributaries of the Rybinsk Reservoir within the district are the Renya (with the left tributary, the Zvana), the Kesma, and the Sebla. Much of the area of the district is covered by forest.

== History ==
The area of the district was originally populated by the Ves, a Finnic tribe; the name of Vesyegonsk derives from the Ves. In the 12th century, the area was at the border between the Novgorod Republic and Rostov-Suzdal Principality (which subsequently evolved into Vladimir-Suzdal Principality). After the latter one disintegrated into smaller feudal domains, the area subsequently passed through the Rostov, Uglich, Yaroslavl, and Beloozero principalities, before ending up in the Grand Duchy of Moscow in the 15th century; by the end of the 15th century, the Novgorod Republic was annexed by Moscow as well.

In the course of the administrative reform carried out in 1708 by Peter the Great, the area was included into Ingermanland Governorate (known since 1710 as Saint Petersburg Governorate), but in 1727 it was transferred to Moscow Governorate. In 1775, Tver Viceroyalty was formed from the lands which previously belonged to Moscow and Novgorod Governorates, and in 1776 Vesyegonsky Uyezd was established as a part of Tver Viceroyalty. Vesyegonsk got the town status. In 1796, the viceroyalty was transformed into Tver Governorate, and Vesyegonsky Uyezd was abolished, the area was moved to Bezhetsky Uyezd. In 1803, it was re-established. On April 25, 1921, Vesyegonsky Uyezd was transferred to newly established Rybinsk Governorate. On February 15, 1923, Rybinsk Governorate was abolished, and the uyezd was transferred back to Tver Governorate.

On July 12, 1929 the governorates and uyezds were abolished. Vesyegonsky District, with the administrative center in the town of Vesyegonsk, was established within Bezhetsk Okrug of Moscow Oblast. On July 23, 1930, the okrugs were abolished, and the districts were directly subordinated to the oblast. On January 29, 1935 Kalinin Oblast was established, and Vesyegonsky District was transferred to Kalinin Oblast. On March 5, 1935 a new division of Kalinin Oblast was introduced, and the area of Vesyegonsk District was reduced. In 1939, the construction of the Rybinsk Reservoir started, and large areas in the lower course of the Mologa were to be submerged under water. In particular, the town of Vesyegonsk was submerged. Because of this, Vesyegonsk was moved to a new location, downgraded to an urban-type settlement, and the administrative center of the district in September, 1939 was moved to the selo of Telyatino. On April 26, 1940 Vesyegonsky District was abolished and split between Sandovsky and Ovinishchensky District. On March 3, 1949 the district was re-established on the areas which previously belonged to Sandovsky and Ovinishchensky Districts, and Vesyegonsk was made the district center. In 1953, Vesyegonsk was granted town status. In 1990, Kalinin Oblast was renamed Tver Oblast.

On March 5, 1935 Ovinishchensky District with the administrative center in the selo of Kesma was established on the areas which previously belonged to Vesyegonsky and Krasnokholmsky Districts. On July 4, 1956 the district was abolished and split between Vesyegonsky and Krasnokholmsky Districts.

== Economy ==
=== Industry ===
There are enterprises of timber and food industries in the district.

=== Agriculture ===
As of 2011, 42 mid-scale farms were operating in the district. The main specialization of agriculture is cattle breeding with meat and milk production. Only 50% of agricultural lands are in use.

=== Transportation ===
A railway connecting Moscow and Mga via Sonkovo and Pestovo crosses the southern part of the district. The major railway stations are in Ovinishchi. There, a railway branches off north to Vesyegonsk, which is the terminal station. The branch between Ovinishchi and Vesyegonsk is said to be the first railway completed in the Soviet Union.

Vesyegonsk is connected by roads with Ustyuzhna and with Tver via Krasny Kholm and Bezhetsk. There are also local roads. There is bus traffic originating from Vesyegonsk.

== Culture and recreation ==
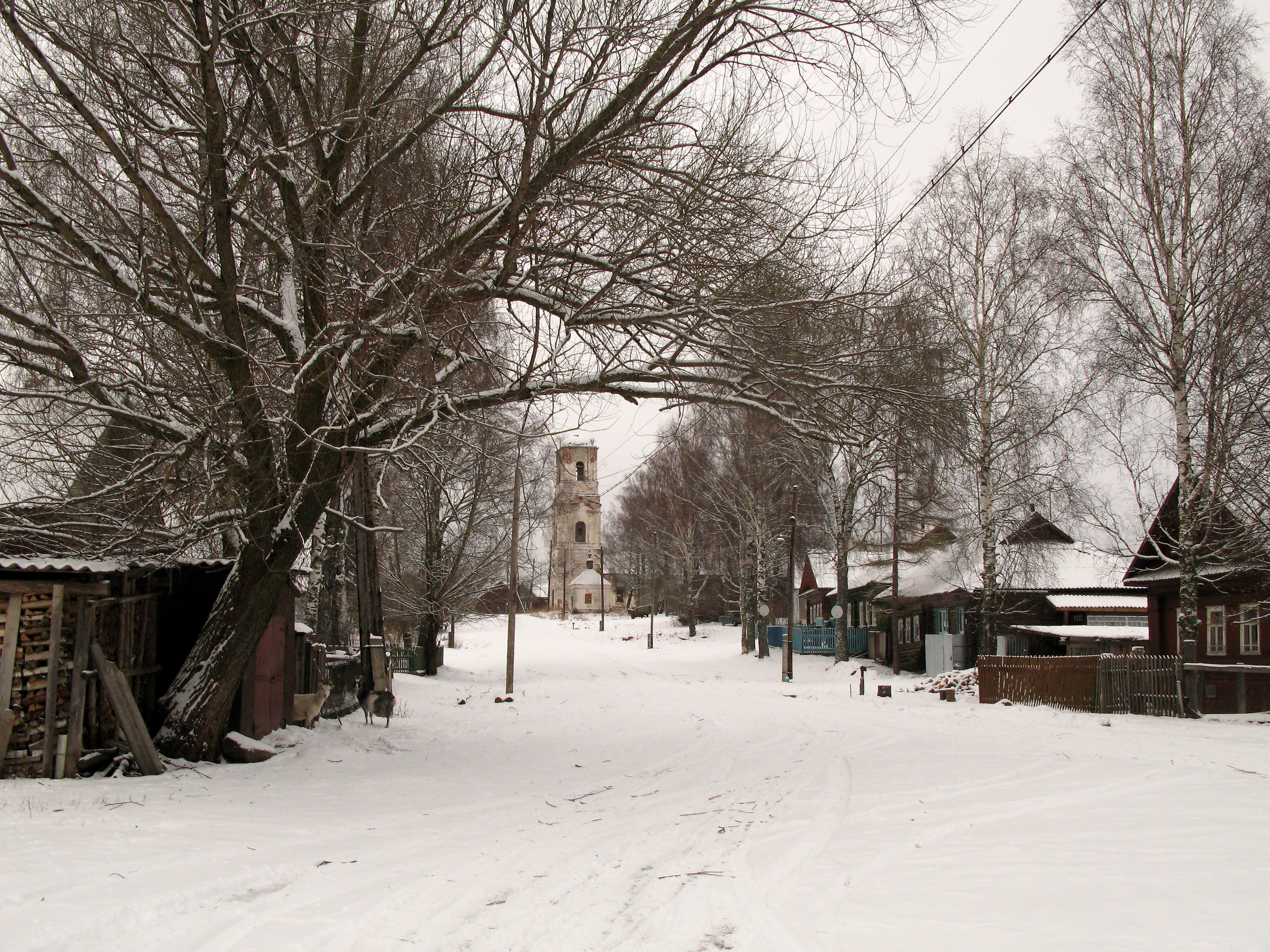
The Trinity Church in the selo of Lyubegoshchi.

The district contains two cultural heritage monuments of federal significance and additionally twenty-seven objects classified as cultural and historical heritage of local significance (five of them in Vesyegonsk). The federal monuments are the Presentation Church of the early 19th century in the selo of Churikovo and an archeological site.

Vesyegonsk hosts the Vesyegonsk District Museum, which has expositions on local history.
