= Sonkovsky District =

Sonkovsky District Сонковский район (Russian)
- District
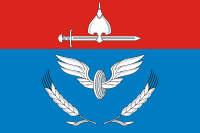
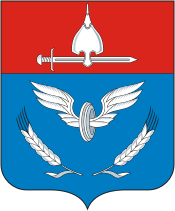
- Flag Coat of arms
- Location of Sonkovsky District in Tver Oblast
- Coordinates: 57°46′50″N 37°09′30″E
- Country: Russia
- Federal subject: Tver Oblast
- Established: 12 July 1929
- Administrative center: Sonkovo

Area
  - Total: 970 km^{2} (370 sq mi)

Population (2010 Census)
  - Total: 8,553
  - Density: 8.8/km^{2} (23/sq mi)
  - Urban: 48.7%
  - Rural: 51.3%

Administrative structure
  - Administrative divisions: 1 Urban settlements, 7 Rural settlements
  - Inhabited localities: 1 urban-type settlements, 181 rural localities

Municipal structure
  - Municipally incorporated as: Sonkovsky Municipal District
  - Municipal divisions: 1 urban settlements, 7 rural settlements
- Time zone: UTC+3 (MSK)
- OKTMO ID: 28651000
- Website: http://www.sonkovo.ru/

Sonkovsky District (Russian: Сонко́вский райо́н) is an administrative and municipal district (raion), one of the thirty-six in Tver Oblast, Russia. It is located in the east of the oblast and borders with Krasnokholmsky District in the north, Nekouzsky District of Yaroslavl Oblast in the east, Kesovogorsky District in the south, and with Bezhetsky District in the west. The area of the district is 970 square kilometers (370 sq mi). Its administrative center is the urban locality (an urban-type settlement) of Sonkovo. Population: 8,553 (2010 Census); 10,523 (2002 census); 13,570 (1989 Soviet census). The population of Sonkovo accounts for 48.7% of the district's total population.

== Geography ==
The district lies entirely in the drainage area of the Rybinsk Reservoir of the Volga River. The rivers in its western part drain into the Ostrechina and the Osen, right tributaries of the Mologa River. The northeastern part of the district belongs to the basin of the Sit River, a tributary of the Rybinsk Reservoir. The Sit itself has its source in the district, northwest of Sonkovo. The rivers in the southeastern part of the district drain into the Korozhechna, another tributary of the Rybinsk Reservoir. The Korozhechna crosses the southern part of the district from west to east.

== History ==
The area is remarkable for being a location of the Battle of the Sit River, which took place in 1238 at the Sit, close to the current selo of Bozhonka, between the advancing Mongols and the army under command of Yuri Vladimirovich, a prince of Vladimir. The Mongols won, and Prince Yuri died in combat. Since 1247, the area was a part of Principality of Tver, and in the 14th century, together with Tver, was annexed by the Grand Duchy of Moscow. From the 17th century, Tver Karelians settled in the area.

In the course of the administrative reform carried out in 1708 by Peter the Great, the area was included into Ingermanland Governorate (known since 1710 as Saint Petersburg Governorate), but in 1727 it was transferred to Moscow Governorate. In 1775, Tver Viceroyalty was formed from the lands which previously belonged to Moscow and Novgorod Governorates. The area was split between Bezhetsk and Kashin Uyezds of Tver Viceroyalty. In 1796, Tver Viceroyalty was transformed into Tver Governorate. On October 3, 1927 Kashinsky Uyezd was abolished and split between Bezhetsky and Kimrsky Uyezds; the area of the district which previously belonged to Kashinsky Uyezd, was transferred to Bezhetsky Uyezd.

The area, previously a backwater, considerably accelerated its economical development after the railroads were constructed in the end of the 19th century.

On July 12, 1929 the governorates and uyezds were abolished. Sonkovsky District, with the administrative center in the settlement of Sonkovo, was established within Bezhetsk Okrug of Moscow Oblast. On July 23, 1930, the okrugs were abolished, and the districts were directly subordinated to the oblast. On January 29, 1935 Kalinin Oblast was established, and Sonkovsky District was transferred to Kalinin Oblast. On February 13, 1963, during the abortive Khrushchyov administrative reform, Sonkovsky District was merged into Bezhetsky District, but on January 12, 1965 it was re-established. In 1990, Kalinin Oblast was renamed Tver Oblast.

== Economy ==
=== Industry ===
The industrial enterprises in the district are located in Sonkovo and serve the railway station. Additionally, there is a milk production plant.

=== Agriculture ===
The main agricultural specializations in the district are cattle breeding with meat and milk production.

=== Transportation ===
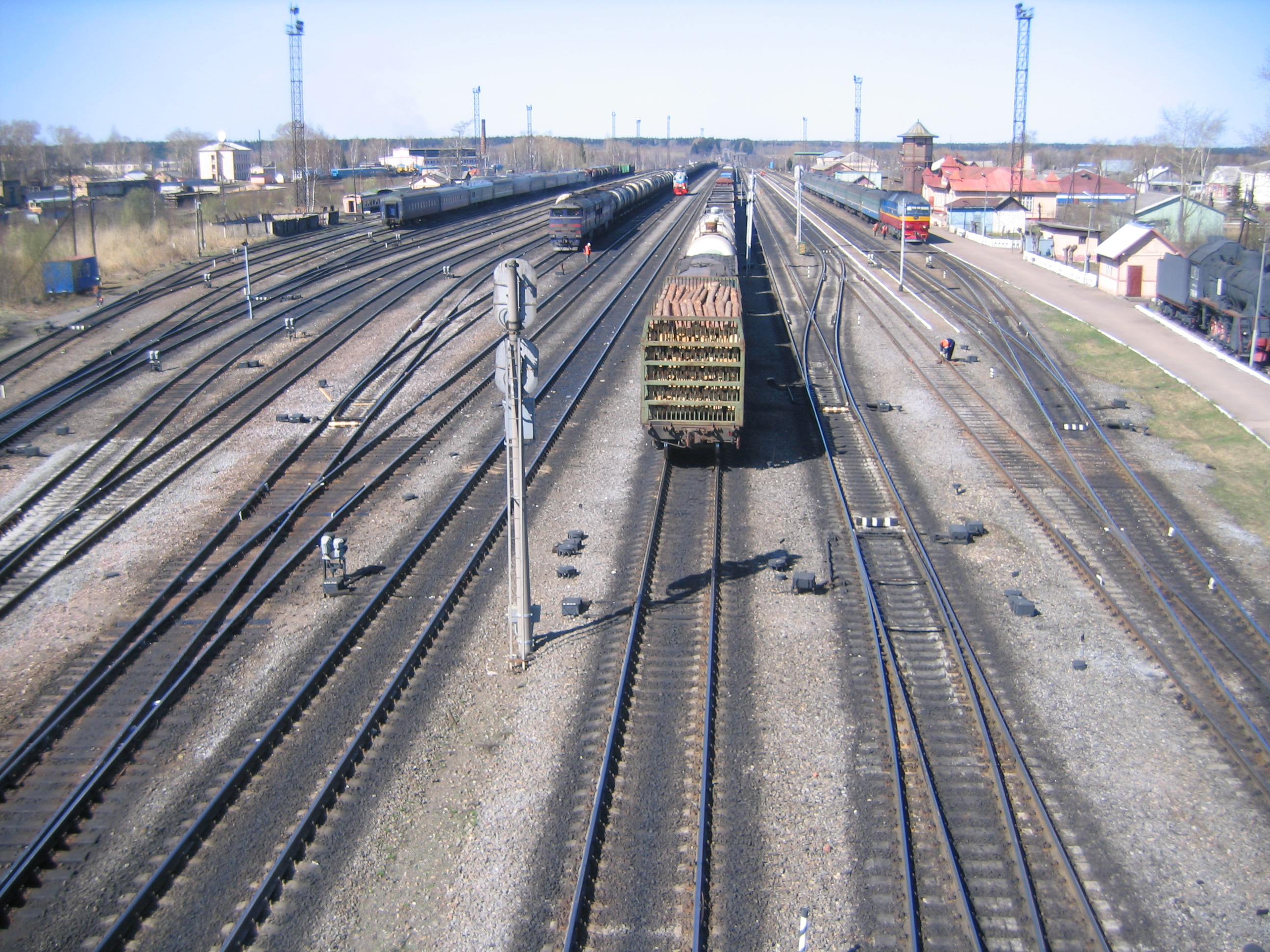
Sonkovo railway station

Two railways cross the district. One, running from south to north, connects Moscow with Mga via Krasny Kholm and Pestovo. Another one, running east to west, connects Rybinsk with Bologoye. Sonkovo, where the two railways cross, is an important junction.

Sonkovo is connected by road with Bezhetsk, where it has access to the roads running to Tver and Vesyegonsk. There are also local roads, with the bus traffic originating from Sonkovo.

== Culture and recreation ==
The district contains twenty-three cultural heritage monuments of federal significance and additionally twenty-eight objects classified as cultural and historical heritage of local significance. The federal monuments include the former monastery complex in the village of Koy, as well as the 18th-century churches in the villages of Odintsovo, Sinevo-Dubrovo, and Rameshki, and a windmill in the village of Prigorki.
