= Tukhani =

Tukhani (Russian: Тухани) is the name of several rural localities in Russia:

- Tukhani, Novgorod Oblast, a village in Dolgovskoye Settlement of Moshenskoy District of Novgorod Oblast
- Tukhani, Tver Oblast, a selo in Sobolinskoye Rural Settlement of Sandovsky District of Tver Oblast
