= Vybor =

Vybor (Russian: Выбор) is the name of several rural localities in Russia:

- Vybor, Leningrad Oblast, a village in Zaklinskoye Settlement Municipal Formation of Luzhsky District of Leningrad Oblast
- Vybor, Pskov Oblast, a village in Novorzhevsky District of Pskov Oblast
- Vybor, Tver Oblast, a village in Vesyegonsky District of Tver Oblast
