= Pestovsky District =

Pestovsky District Пестовский район (Russian)
- District
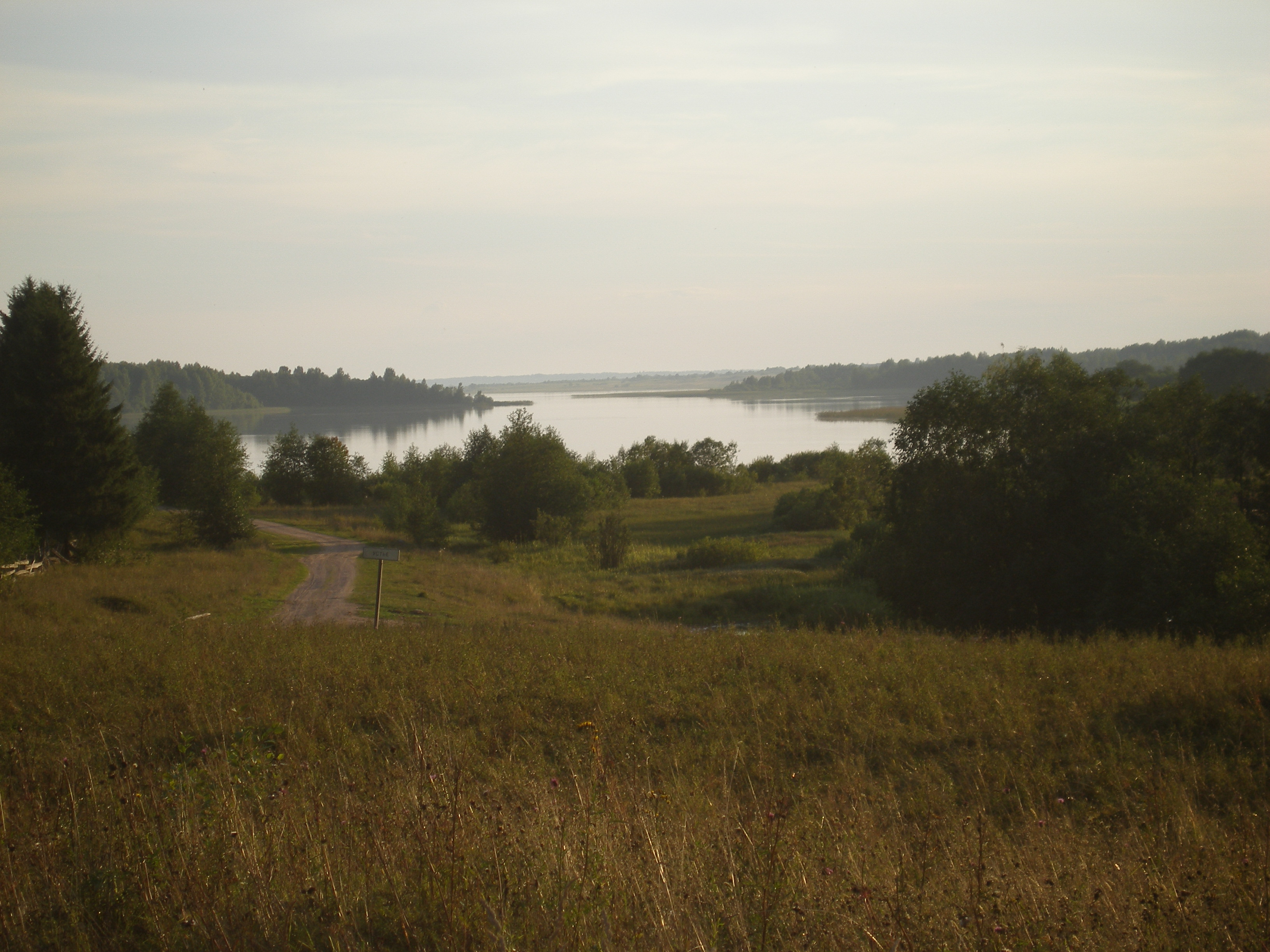
- Meglino lake

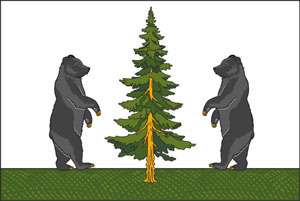
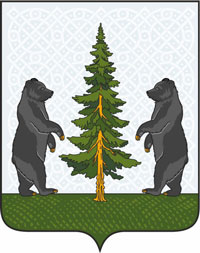
- Flag Coat of arms
- Location of Pestovsky District in Novgorod Oblast
- Coordinates: 58°36′N 35°49′E
- Country: Russia
- Federal subject: Novgorod Oblast
- Established: October 1, 1927
- Administrative center: Pestovo

Area
  - Total: 2,120 km^{2} (820 sq mi)

Population (2010 Census)
  - Total: 21,676
  - Density: 10.2/km^{2} (26.5/sq mi)
  - Urban: 73.4%
  - Rural: 26.6%

Administrative structure
  - Administrative divisions: 1 Towns of district significance, 7 Settlements
  - Inhabited localities: 1 cities/towns, 204 rural localities

Municipal structure
  - Municipally incorporated as: Pestovsky Municipal District
  - Municipal divisions: 1 urban settlements, 7 rural settlements
- Time zone: UTC+3 (MSK)
- OKTMO ID: 49632000
- Website: http://adm-pestovo.ru/

Pestovsky District (Russian: Песто́вский райо́н) is an administrative and municipal district (raion), one of the twenty-one in Novgorod Oblast, Russia. It is located in the east of the oblast and borders with Chagodoshchensky District of Vologda Oblast in the north, Ustyuzhensky District of Vologda Oblast in the northeast, Sandovsky District of Tver Oblast in the southeast, Lesnoy District of Tver Oblast in the south, Moshenskoy District in the west, and with Khvoyninsky District in the northwest. The area of the district is 2,120 square kilometers (820 sq mi). Its administrative center is the town of Pestovo. Population: 21,676 (2010 census); 23,931 (2002 Census); 25,331 (1989 Soviet census). The population of Pestovo accounts for 73.4% of the district's total population.

== Geography ==
The whole area of the district belongs to the basin of the Mologa River, which crosses the district from south to north. In particular, the town of Pestovo is located on the banks of the Mologa. There are many lakes in the west of the district. The biggest one, Lake Meglino, is shared with Moshenskoy District and drains into the Mologa via the Meglinka. Another major tributary of the Mologa within the district is the Kirva. A significant part the district's territory is covered by woods.

== History ==
The area was originally populated by Balto-Finnic peoples; Krivich Slavs arrived later. From the 9th century, the area gradually fell under control of the Novgorod Republic, and by the 12th century it was a frontier area, with the Principality of Rostov located immediately to the east and showing interest in the Mologa lands. The region experienced an influx of settlers in the 13th century, when peasants were fleeing the Mongols. It belonged to the Novgorod Republic, until in the 15th century, after the fall of Novgorod, it became a part of the Grand Duchy of Moscow. The area was severely depopulated in the end of the 16th century and in the beginning of the 17th century, as a consequence of a series of epidemics followed by the Time of Troubles. First villages in what now is Pestovsky District were mentioned in the 16th century.

In the course of the administrative reform carried out in 1708 by Peter the Great, the area was included into Ingermanland Governorate (known since 1710 as Saint Petersburg Governorate). In 1727, separate Novgorod Governorate was split off. In 1776, the area was transferred to Novgorod Viceroyalty. In 1796, the viceroyalty was abolished, and the area, then a part of Ustyuzhensky Uyezd, was transferred to Novgorod Governorate.

In June 1918, five uyezds of Novgorod Governorate, including Ustyuzhensky Uyezd, were split off to form Cherepovets Governorate, with the administrative center in Cherepovets. On August 1, 1927, Cherepovets Governorate was abolished, and its area became Cherepovets Okrug of Leningrad Oblast. Simultaneously, uyezds were abolished, and, effective October 1, 1927, Pestovsky District was established within Cherepovets Okrug, with the administrative center in the settlement of Pestovo. On September 19, 1927, Pestovo was granted work settlement status. On July 23, 1930, the okrugs were abolished, and the districts were directly subordinated to the oblast. In 1930, a minor part of Mikhaylovsky District of Moscow Oblast was transferred to Pestovsky District. On July 5, 1944, Pestovsky District was transferred to newly established Novgorod Oblast and remained there ever since. On February 1, 1963, the district was transformed into Pestovsky Rural District in the course of the Nikita Khrushchev's abortive administrative reform. On January 12, 1965, this was reverted; at the same time Pestovo was granted town status.

== Economy ==
=== Industry ===
The mechanical factory in Pestovo currently mainly produces metallic containers and construction blocks. There are also enterprises of timber industry and food industry.

=== Agriculture ===
The district specializes in cattle breeding and milk production.

=== Transportation ===
The railroad connecting Sonkovo and Mga, or, more generally, the northern railroad between Moscow and St. Petersburg, crosses the district from east to west. Pestovo is the biggest railway station within the district.

A road connecting Ustyuzhna and Borovichi runs through the district, passing Pestovo. There are also local roads.

== Culture and recreation ==
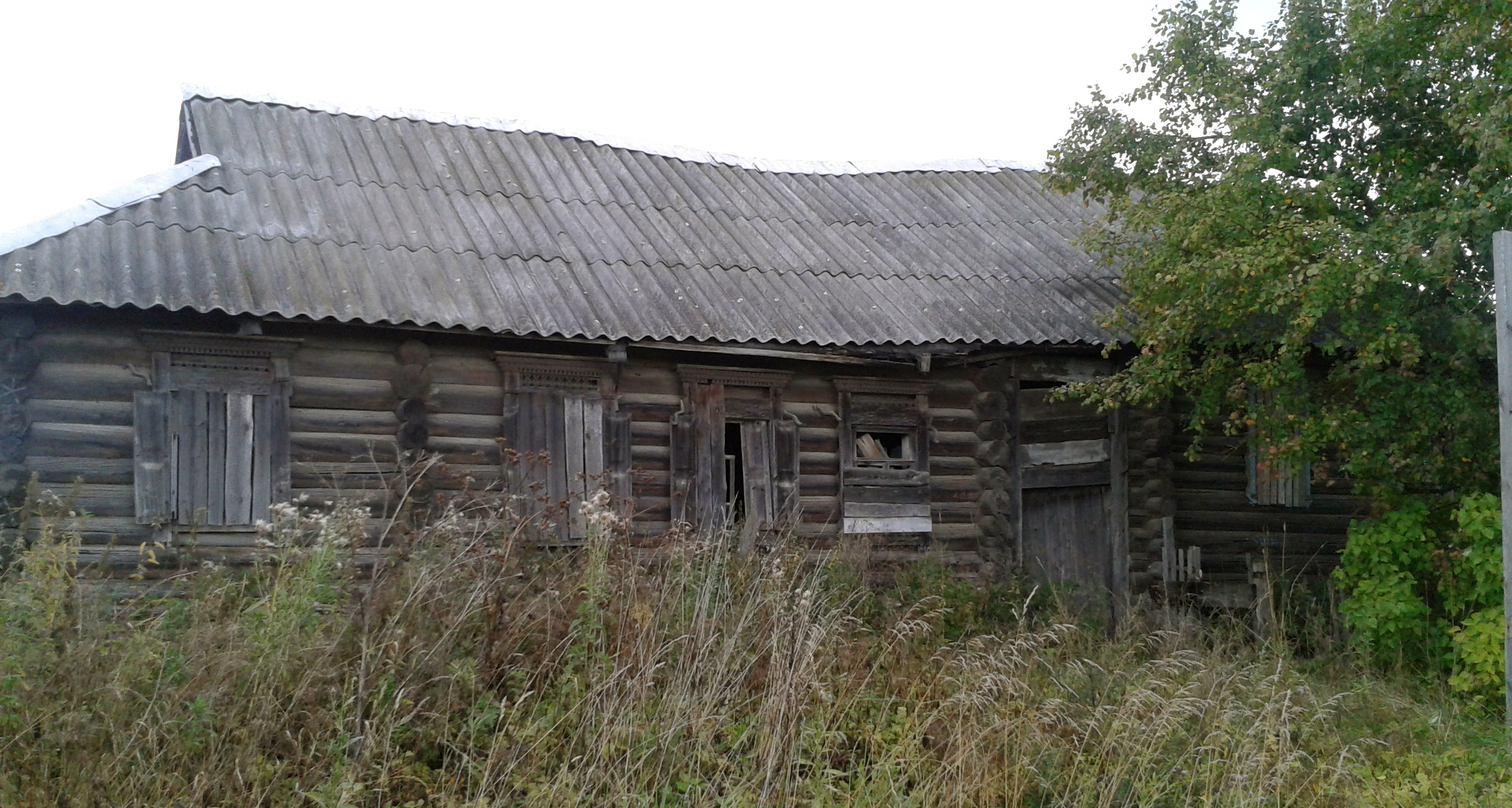
Matveyeva double house in the village of Bogoslovo

The district contains four cultural heritage monuments of federal significance and additionally eighty-nine objects classified as cultural and historical heritage of local significance. All federal cultural heritage objects are archaeological sites.

== Notable residents ==
- Anatoly Dobryakov (1939–2003), politician, born in Bogoslovo
