= Sandovo =

Sandovo Сандово
- Work settlement
- Interactive map of Sandovo
- Location of Sandovo Sandovo (Tver Oblast)
- Coordinates: 58°27′25″N 36°24′25″E
- Country: Russia
- Federal subject: Tver Oblast
- Administrative district: Sandovsky District
- Urban-type settlement status since: 1967

Population (2010 Census)
  - Total: 3,507
  - Estimate (2021): 3,106 (−11.4%)

Administrative status
  - Capital of: Sandovsky District

Municipal status
  - Municipal district: Sandovsky Municipal District
  - Urban settlement: Sandovskoye Urban Settlement
  - Capital of: Sandovsky Municipal District, Sandovskoye Urban Settlement
- Time zone: UTC+3 (MSK)
- Postal code: 171750
- OKTMO ID: 28649151051

Sandovo (Russian: Са́ндово) is an urban-type settlement and the administrative center of Sandovsky District of Tver Oblast, Russia. Population: 3,507 (2010 census); 3,933 (2002 census); 4,605 (1989 Soviet census).

== History ==
Sandovo railway station was open in 1919. At the time, it belonged to Vesyegonsky Uyezd of Tver Governorate. The station was named after the selo of Sandovo, however, it was located far from the selo. The closest village to the station was Orudovo. On April 25, 1921, Vesyegonsky Uyezd was transferred to newly established Rybinsk Governorate. On February 15, 1923, Rybinsk Governorate was abolished, and the uyezd was transferred back to Tver Governorate.

On July 12, 1929 the governorates and uyezds were abolished. Sandovsky District, with the administrative center in the selo of Sandovo, was established within Bezhetsk Okrug of Moscow Oblast. On July 23, 1930, the okrugs were abolished, and the districts were directly subordinated to the oblast. In 1932, the district center was transferred to the village of Orudovo, which eventually grew up as the settlement of Sandovo. Simultaneously, the selo of Sandovo was renamed Staroye Sandovo. On January 29, 1935 Kalinin Oblast was established, and Sandovsky District was transferred to Tver Oblast. In February 1963, during the abortive Khrushchyov administrative reform, Sandovsky District was merged into Vesyegonsly District, but in January 1965 it was re-established. In 1967, Sandovo was granted urban-type settlement status.

== Economy ==
=== Industry ===
Sandovo has enterprises of timber and food industries.

=== Transportation ===
A railway connecting Moscow and Mga via Sonkovo and Pestovo passes through Sandovo.

Sandovo is connected by road with Krasny Kholm via Molokovo. Gravel roads run to Vesyegonsk and Ustyuzhna. There are also local roads, with bus traffic originating from Sandovo.

== Culture and recreation ==
In the settlement, there is one object classified as cultural heritage of local significance. This is a monument to soldiers fallen in World War II.

In Sandovo, there is a Bee Museum, which shows materials related to beekeeping, a traditional occupation of local peasants. The museum was opened in 2007.
