= Bezhetsky District =

Bezhetsky District Бежецкий район (Russian)
- District
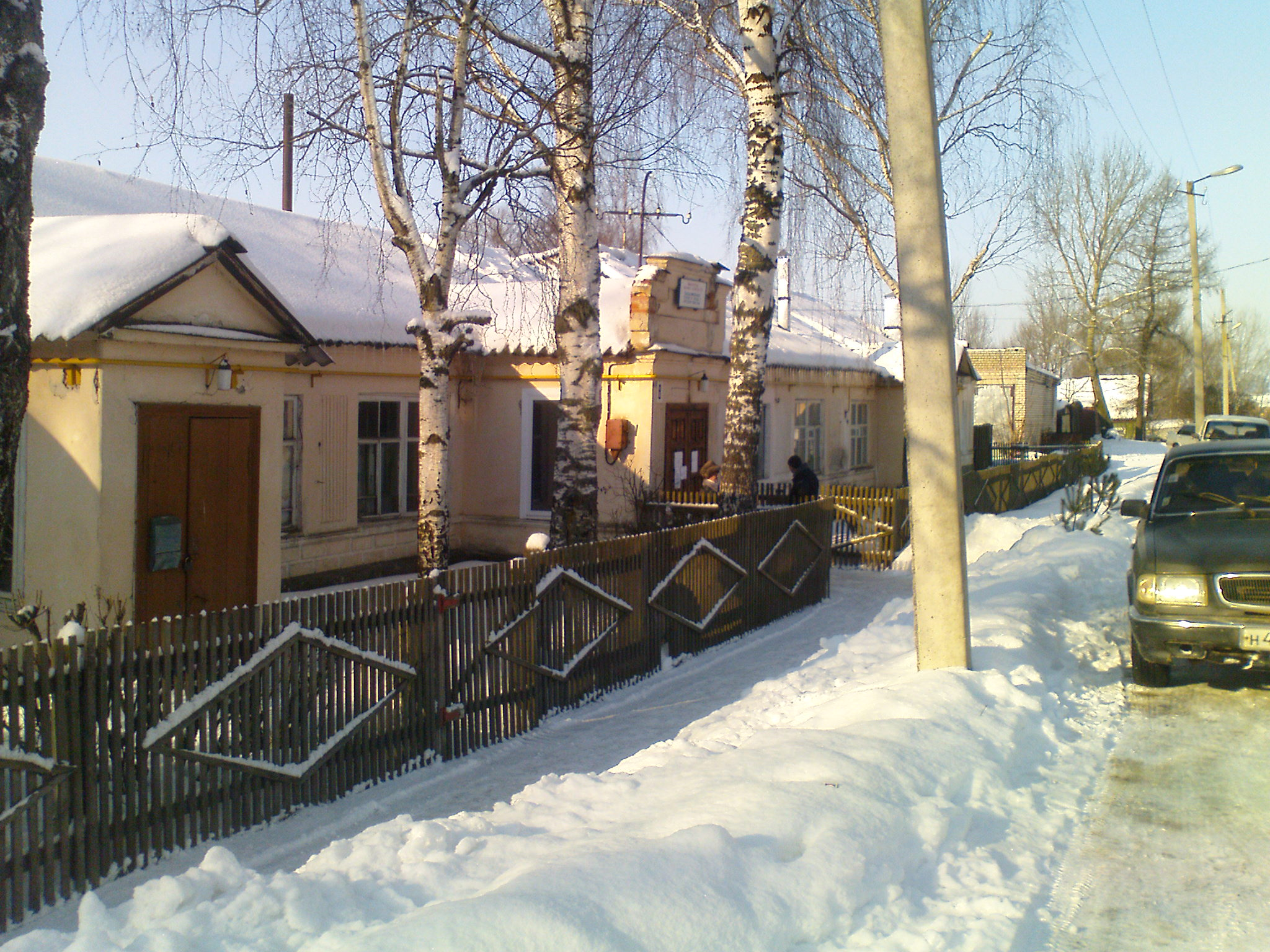
- Bezhetsk, Bezhetsky District

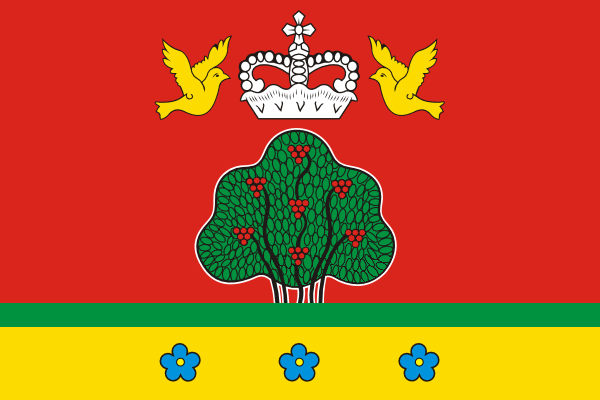
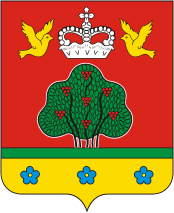
- Flag Coat of arms
- Location of Bezhetsky District in Tver Oblast
- Coordinates: 57°47′N 36°42′E
- Country: Russia
- Federal subject: Tver Oblast
- Established: 1929
- Administrative center: Bezhetsk

Area
  - Total: 2,810 km^{2} (1,080 sq mi)

Population (2010 Census)
  - Total: 36,701
  - Density: 13.1/km^{2} (33.8/sq mi)
  - Urban: 66.8%
  - Rural: 33.2%

Administrative structure
  - Administrative divisions: 1 Urban settlements, 13 Rural settlements
  - Inhabited localities: 1 cities/towns, 400 rural localities

Municipal structure
  - Municipally incorporated as: Bezhetsky Municipal District
  - Municipal divisions: 1 urban settlements, 13 rural settlements
- Time zone: UTC+3 (MSK)
- OKTMO ID: 28604000
- Website: http://адм-бежецк.рф/glavnaya/

Bezhetsky District (Russian: Бе́жецкий райо́н) is an administrative and municipal district (raion), one of the thirty-six in Tver Oblast, Russia. It is located in the east of the oblast and borders with Molokovsky District in the north, Krasnokholmsky District in the northwest, Sonkovsky and Kesovogorsky Districts in the east, Kashinsky District in the southeast, Rameshkovsky District in the south, and with Maksatikhinsky District in the west. The area of the district is 2,810 square kilometers (1,080 sq mi). Its administrative center is the town of Bezhetsk. Population: 36,701 (2010 Census); 14,277 (2002 census); 18,786 (1989 Soviet census). The population of Bezhetsk accounts for 66.8% of the district's total population.

== Geography ==
The whole area of the district belongs to the drainage basin of the Volga River, and much of the area belongs to the basin of the Mologa. The Mologa flows through the district, entering it from the west and turning north. The town of Bezhetsk, the district center, is located on the banks of the Mologa. The principal tributary of the Mologa within the district, the Osen (right), is rather short, but its drainage basin covers the whole eastern part of the district. The Tifina, a tributary of the Volchina, a major left tributary of the Mologa, has its source in the southwestern corner of the district. Minor areas in the southeast of the district belong to the basin of the Kashinka River, a tributary of the Volga. The rivers in the southern part of the district drain into the Drezna River, a left tributary of the Medveditsa River.

== History ==
Bezhetsk area was first mentioned in chronicles in 1137. At the time, it was a part of the Novgorod Republic. Later, the area, known as Bezhetsky Verkh, became disputed between Novgorod, Tver, and Moscow, and eventually in the 15th century firmly became a part of the Grand Duchy of Moscow. The center of Bezhetsky Verkh was Bezhichi, which were destroyed in the end of the 13th century, and then the center was transferred to Gorodetsk (Gorodetsko), currently known as Bezhetsk. Since 1433, Bezhetsk had its own prince, who was subordinate to the Grand Prince of Moscow.

In the course of the administrative reform carried out in 1708 by Peter the Great, the area was included into Ingermanland Governorate (known since 1710 as Saint Petersburg Governorate), but in 1727 it was transferred to Moscow Governorate. In 1775, Tver Viceroyalty was formed from the lands which previously belonged to Moscow and Novgorod Governorates. In 1776, Gorodetsk was renamed Bezhetsk and was made the center of Bezhetsky Uyezd. In 1796, Tver Viceroyalty was transformed into Tver Governorate. Bezhetsk remained the center of the uyezd until 1929.

On July 12, 1929 the governorates and uyezds were abolished. Bezhetsky District, with the administrative center in the town of Bezhetsk, was established within Bezhetsk Okrug of Moscow Oblast. On July 23, 1930, the okrugs were abolished, and the districts were directly subordinated to the oblast. On January 29, 1935 Kalinin Oblast was established, and Bezhetsky District was transferred to Kalinin Oblast. In 1990, Kalinin Oblast was renamed Tver Oblast.

On January 29, 1935 Tebleshsky District with the administrative center in the selo of Kiverichi was established as a part of Kalinin Oblast. On July 4, 1956 it was abolished and split between Bezhetsky and Goritsky Districts.

== Economy ==
=== Industry ===
There are enterprises of timber, textile, and food industries, as well as a plant producing air compressors, all located in Bezhetsk.

=== Agriculture ===
The main agricultural specializations of the district are cattle breeding with meat and milk production, as well as growing of potatoes, flax, and vegetables.

=== Transportation ===
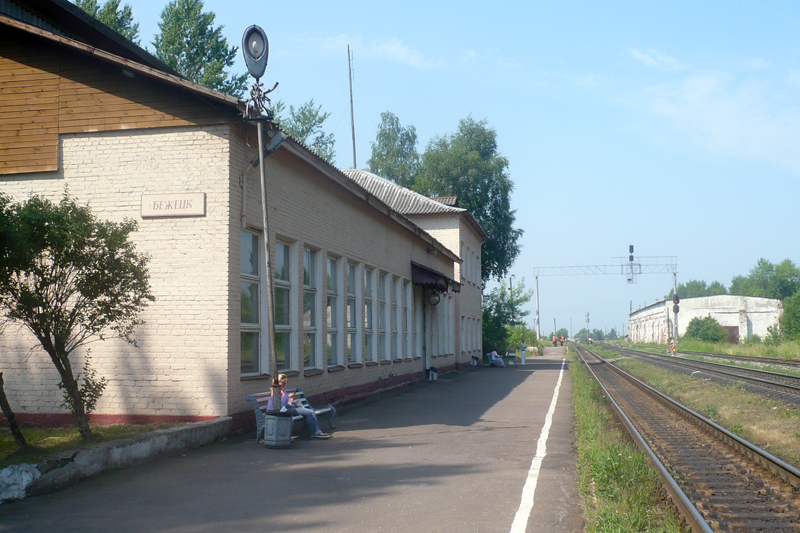
Bezhetsk railway station.

A railway connecting Rybinsk and Bologoye via Sonkovo crosses the district from east to west. The most important railway station within the district is Bezhetsk.

Bezhetsk is located on the road connecting Tver and Vesyegonsk, which crosses the district from south to north. It is also connected by roads with Sonkovo, Kesova Gora, and Maksatikha. There are local roads as well, with bus traffic originating from Bezhetsk.

None of the rives within the district are navigable.

== Culture and recreation ==
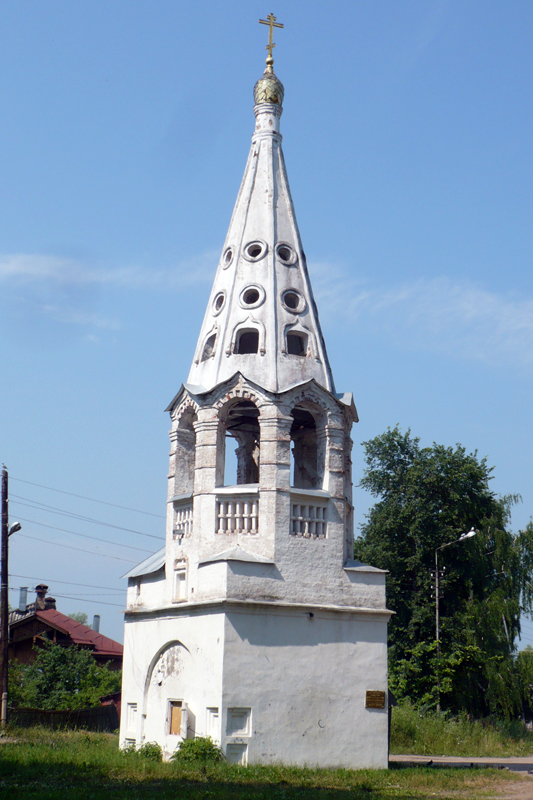
The bell-tower of the Church of the Presentation of Mary, Bezhetsk.

The district contains twenty-two cultural heritage monuments of federal significance (seven of them in the town of Bezhetsk) and additionally sixty objects classified as cultural and historical heritage of local significance (twenty-four of them in Bezhetsk). The federal monuments include trade arcades and the Church of the Presentation of Mary in Bezhetsk, a number of (mostly 18th century) churches in the villages, as well as a number of archeological sites.

There are two museums in the district. The Bezhetsk District and Literature Museum, located in Bezhetsk, shows expositions about the author Vyacheslav Shishkov and the musician Vasily Andreyev, who were both born in Bezhetsk. The House of Poets museum in the selo of Gradnitsy highlights the biography of Anna Akhmatova, one of the most celebrated Russian poets. The building was originally located in the village of Slepnyovo and belonged to the mother of the poet Nikolay Gumilev, who was married to Akhmatova between 1910 and 1918. Akhmatova, Gumilev, and their son, Lev Gumilev, we spending considerable periods of time in the house in the 1910s. In 1918 the house was sold and eventually moved to Gradnitsy. The museum was open in 1989, after serving for many years as a school.
