= Krasny Kholm, Krasnokholmsky District, Tver Oblast =

Town in Tver Oblast, Russia

Krasny Kholm Красный Холм
- Town
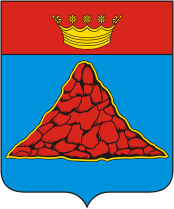
- Coat of arms
- Interactive map of Krasny Kholm
- Location of Krasny Kholm Krasny Kholm (Tver Oblast)
- Coordinates: 58°04′N 37°07′E
- Country: Russia
- Federal subject: Tver Oblast
- Administrative district: Krasnokholmsky District
- Urban settlementSelsoviet: Krasny Kholm
- First mentioned: 1518
- Town status since: 1776
- Elevation: 150 m (490 ft)

Population (2010 Census)
  - Total: 5,608
  - Estimate (2025): 4,830 (−13.9%)

Administrative status
  - Capital of: Krasnokholmsky District, Krasny Kholm Urban Settlement

Municipal status
  - Municipal district: Krasnokholmsky Municipal District
  - Urban settlement: Krasny Kholm Urban Settlement
  - Capital of: Krasnokholmsky Municipal District, Krasny Kholm Urban Settlement
- Time zone: UTC+3 (MSK)
- Postal codes: 171660, 171661, 171679
- OKTMO ID: 28632101001

Krasny Kholm (Russian: Кра́сный Холм) is a town and the administrative center of Krasnokholmsky District in Tver Oblast, Russia. Population: 5,608 (2010 census); 6,396 (2002 census); 7,875 (1989 Soviet census).

== History ==
What is now Krasny Kholm was first attested as the village of Spas-na-Kholmu as early as 1518. The village belonged to the Antoniyev Monastery of St. Nicholas until its lands were secularized in 1764. In the course of the administrative reform carried out in 1708 by Peter the Great, the area was included into Ingermanland Governorate (known since 1710 as Saint Petersburg Governorate), but in 1727 it was transferred to Moscow Governorate. In 1775, Tver Viceroyalty was formed from the lands which previously belonged to Moscow and Novgorod Governorates, and in 1776, Krasnokholmsky Uyezd was established as a part of Tver Viceroyalty. In 1776, the village was granted town status and received its current name. In 1796, the viceroyalty was transformed into Tver Governorate; Krasnokholmsky Uyezd was abolished, with its territory transferred to Vesyegonsky Uyezd. The railway between Rybinsk and St. Petersburg reached the town in 1899, boosting its development.

On March 10, 1918, Krasnokholmsky Uyezd was re-established. On April 25, 1921, it was transferred to newly established Rybinsk Governorate. On February 6, 1923, Rybinsk Governorate was abolished and the uyezd was transferred back to Tver Governorate. On March 3, 1924, Krasnokholmsky Uyezd was abolished and split between Bezhetsky and Vesyegonsky Uyezds.

On July 12, 1929 the governorates and uyezds were abolished. Krasnokholmsky District, with the administrative center in Krasny Kholm, was established within Bezhetsk Okrug of Moscow Oblast on the territories which previously belonged to Bezhetsky and Vesyegonsky Uyezds. On July 23, 1930, the okrugs were abolished and the districts were directly subordinated to the oblast. On January 29, 1935, Krasnokholmsky District was transferred to newly established Kalinin Oblast.

== Administrative and municipal status ==
Within the framework of administrative divisions, Krasny Kholm serves as the administrative center of Krasnokholmsky District. As an administrative division, it is, together with two rural localities, incorporated within Krasnokholmsky District as Krasny Kholm Urban Settlement. As a municipal division, this administrative unit also has urban settlement status and is a part of Krasnokholmsky Municipal District.

== Economy ==
=== Industry ===
The main industrial enterprise in the town is Krasny Kholm Electromechanical Plant. There are enterprises of timber, textile, and food industries as well.

=== Transportation ===
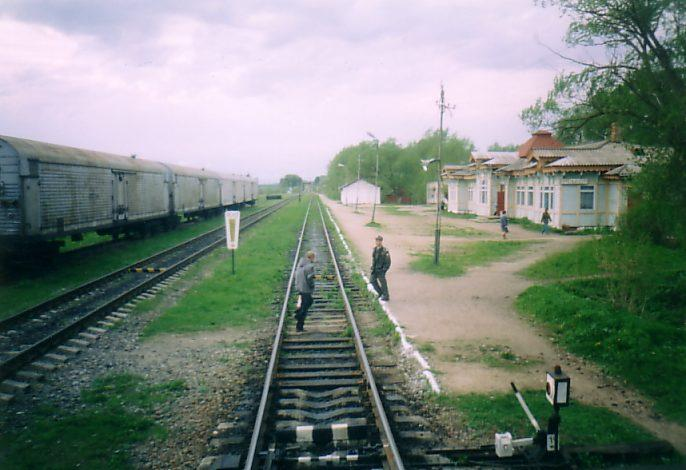
Krasny Kholm railway station

A railway connecting Moscow and Mga via Sonkovo and Pestovo passes through Krasny Kholm. Krasny Kholm railway station is a major station in the town.

Krasny Kholm is connected by roads with Ustyuzhna via Vesyegonsk, with Tver via Bezhetsk, and with Sandovo via Molokovo. There are also local roads with bus traffic originating from Krasny Kholm.

== Culture and recreation ==
Krasny Kholm contains thirteen cultural heritage monuments of federal significance and additionally forty objects classified as cultural and historical heritage of local significance. The federal monuments are the buildings of the Antoniyev Krasnokholmsky Monastery. On the bank of the Mologa River, within two miles from the town, lie the ruins of the Antoniyev Monastery. The monastery cathedral was commissioned by Andrey Bolshoy in 1481; it was consecrated in 1493 and was rebuilt in limestone half a century later. This building—the oldest in the oblast—was reduced by the Bolsheviks to rubble; it still stands roofless and continues to decay. The Intercession Church (1596), as well as 17th-century walls and cells, were either demolished or mutilated beyond repair.

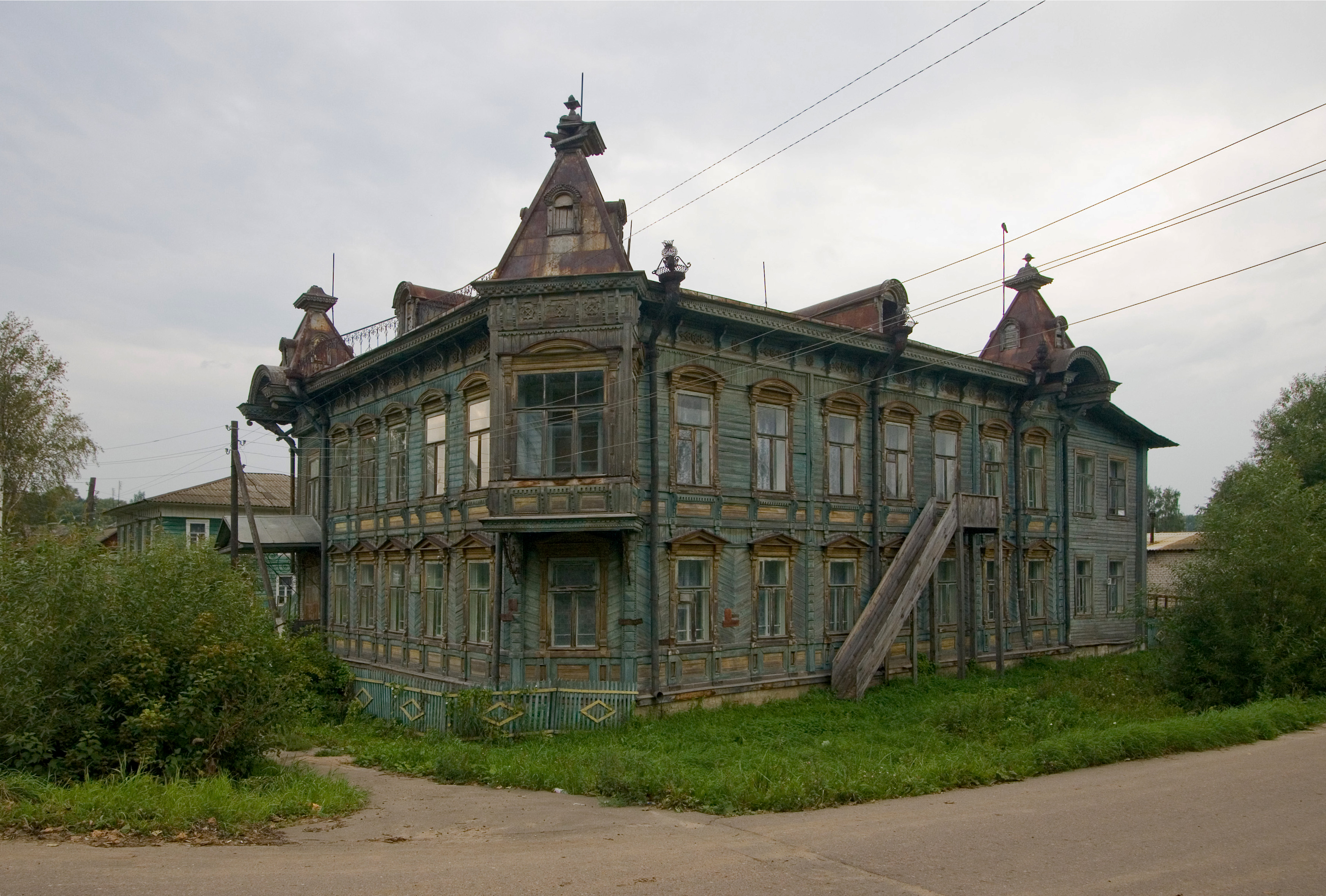
This former administrative building in Krasny Kholm is one of the town's objects of cultural heritage

Krasnokholmsky District Museum, located in Krasny Holm, was established in 1964. It has expositions on local history.

== Notable people ==
Krasny Kholm was the birthplace of Oleg Lomakin and Alexander Myasnikov, who was one of the most famous therapists of the Soviet period. Myasnikov was present at Stalin's dacha (Kuntsevo Dacha) in the last days of Stalin.

It is also thought that Krasny Kholm is linked to the myth of Kitezh.
