= Kesma =

Rural locality in Vesyegonsky District, Tver Oblast, Russia

Coordinates: 58°24′N 37°04′E

Kesma (Russian: Кесьма́) is a rural locality (a selo) in Vesyegonsky District of Tver Oblast, Russia.

On March 5, 1935, Ovinishchensky District with the administrative center in Kesma was established on the territories which were previously a part of Vesyegonsky and Krasnokholmsky Districts. On July 4, 1956, the district was abolished and split between Vesyegonsky and Krasnokholmsky Districts.
