= Molokovo, Molokovsky District, Tver Oblast =

Settlement in Tver Oblast, Russia

Molokovo Молоково
- Work settlement
- Interactive map of Molokovo
- Location of Molokovo Molokovo (Tver Oblast)
- Coordinates: 58°10′N 36°46′E
- Country: Russia
- Federal subject: Tver Oblast
- Administrative district: Molokovsky District
- Founded: 1568
- Urban-type settlement status since: 1987

Population (2010 Census)
  - Total: 2,331
  - Estimate (2021): 1,798 (−22.9%)

Administrative status
  - Capital of: Molokovsky District

Municipal status
  - Municipal district: Molokovsky Municipal District
  - Urban settlement: Molokovskoye Urban Settlement
  - Capital of: Molokovsky Municipal District, Molokovskoye Urban Settlement
- Time zone: UTC+3 (MSK)
- Postal code: 171680
- OKTMO ID: 28642151051

Molokovo (Russian: Молоко́во) is an urban-type settlement and the administrative center of Molokovsky District of Tver Oblast, Russia. Population: 2,331 (2010 census); 2,572 (2002 census); 2,804 (1989 Soviet census).

== History ==
Molokovo was first mentioned in written documents in 1568. In the course of the administrative reform carried out in 1708 by Peter the Great, the area was included into Ingermanland Governorate (known since 1710 as Saint Petersburg Governorate), but in 1727 it was transferred to Moscow Governorate. In 1775, Tver Viceroyalty was formed from the lands which previously belonged to Moscow and Novgorod Governorates. The area was a part of Bezhetsky Uyezd of Tver Viceroyalty, from 1796 of Tver Governorate, and Molokovo was the center of Molokovskaya Volost.

On July 12, 1929 the governorates and uyezds were abolished. Molokovsky District, with the administrative center in Molokovo, was established within Bezhetsk Okrug of Moscow Oblast. On July 23, 1930, the okrugs were abolished, and the districts were directly subordinated to the oblast. On January 29, 1935 Kalinin Oblast was established, and Molokovsky District was transferred to Tver Oblast. In February 1963, during the abortive Khrushchyov administrative reform, Molokovsky District was merged into Krasnokholmsky District, but on December 30, 1966 it was re-established. In 1987, Molokovo was granted urban-type settlement status.

== Economy ==
=== Industry ===
There are enterprises of timber and food (in particular, cheese production) industries in Molokovo.

=== Transportation ===
Molokovo is connected by road with Krasny Kholm and with Sandovo. There are also local roads. The closest railway stations are in Sandovo and in Krasny Kholm.

== Culture and recreation ==
Molokovo has one object classified as historical heritage of local significance. This is the school where Mikhail Kornilov, a future Hero of the Soviet Union, was a student.

In 2003, a regional museum was opened in Molokovo. The museum is named after Nikolai Ogarkov, Marshal of the Soviet Union, who was born in Molokovo, and presents expositions about Ogarkov.
