= Malaya Lipenka =

Malaya Lipenka Малая Липенка
- Village
- Location within Vologda Oblast Location within Russia
- Coordinates: 58°52′N 37°05′E
- Country: Russia
- Region: Vologda Oblast
- District: Cherepovetsky District
- Time zone: UTC+3:00

Malaya Lipenka (Russian: Малая Липенка) is a rural locality (a village) in Korotovskoye Rural Settlement, Cherepovetsky District, Vologda Oblast, Russia. The population was 23 as of 2002. There are 6 streets.

== Geography ==
Malaya Lipenka is located 78 km (48 mi) southwest of Cherepovets (the district's administrative centre) by road. Pochinok is the nearest rural locality.
