= Vesyegonsky Uyezd =

Vesyegonsky Uyezd (Весьегонский уезд) was one of the subdivisions of the Tver Governorate of the Russian Empire. Its capital was Vesyegonsk. Vesyegonsky Uyezd was located in the northeastern part of the governorate (mostly in present-day northeastern Tver Oblast with a small part in the easternmost Novgorod Oblast). The territory of Vesyegonsky Uyezd corresponds to most of Vesyegonsky, Sandovsky, Lesnoy, and Krasnokholmsky districts and small parts of Molokovsky and Pestovsky districts.

== Demographics ==
At the time of the Russian Empire Census of 1897, Vesyegonsky Uyezd had a population of 155,431. Of these, 83.7% spoke Russian and 16.2% Karelian as their native language.
