= Bezhetsky Uyezd =

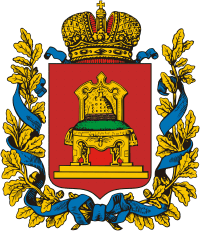
Coat of arms of Tver Governorate of the Russian Empire

Bezhetsky Uyezd (Бежецкий уезд) was one of the subdivisions of the Tver Governorate of the Russian Empire. Its capital was Bezhetsk. Bezhetsky Uyezd was situated in the eastern part of the governorate (in the eastern part of the present-day Tver Oblast). The territory of Bezhetsky Uyezd corresponds to the present-day Bezhetsky District and parts of Maksatikhinsky, Molokovsky, Krasnokholmsky, Sonkovsky, Kesovogorsky, Kashinsky, Rameshkovsky and Likhoslavlsky districts, all of which are part of Tver Oblast.

== Demographics ==
At the time of the Russian Empire Census of 1897, Bezhetsky Uyezd had a population of 247,952. Of these, 80.8% spoke Russian and 19.0% Karelian as their native language.
