= Bezhetsk =

Town in Tver Oblast, Russia

Bezhetsk Бежецк
- Town

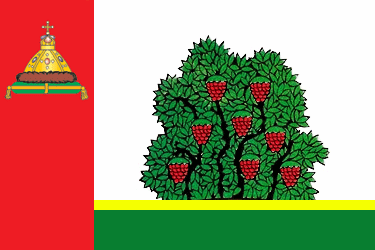
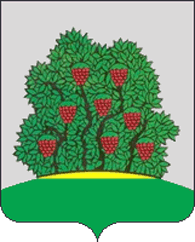
- Flag Coat of arms
- Interactive map of Bezhetsk
- Location of Bezhetsk Bezhetsk (Tver Oblast)
- Coordinates: 57°46′N 36°42′E
- Country: Russia
- Federal subject: Tver Oblast
- Administrative district: Bezhetsky District
- Urban settlementSelsoviet: Bezhetsk
- Town status since: 1776
- Elevation: 145 m (476 ft)

Population (2010 Census)
  - Total: 24,522
  - Estimate (2025): 20,550 (−16.2%)

Administrative status
  - Capital of: Bezhetsky District, Bezhetsk Urban Settlement

Municipal status
  - Municipal district: Bezhetsky Municipal District
  - Urban settlement: Bezhetsk Urban Settlement
  - Capital of: Bezhetsky Municipal District, Bezhetsk Urban Settlement
- Time zone: UTC+3 (MSK)
- Postal codes: 171980–171984, 171987, 171988, 171999
- Dialing code: +7 48231
- OKTMO ID: 28604101001
- Website: bezhetsk.tv

Bezhetsk (Russian: Бе́жецк) is a town and the administrative center of Bezhetsky District in Tver Oblast, Russia, located on the Mologa River at its confluence with the Ostrechina. Population: 24,522 (2010 census); 28,643 (2002 census); 30,377 (1989 Soviet census); 20,618 (2024). It was previously known as Gorodetsk (until 1766).

== History ==
The settlement of Bezhichi was first mentioned in 1137, when it was owned by Novgorod. The original name, with the literal meaning of "refugees", suggests that early settlers were former Novgorodians. Historical Bezhichi was located 20 kilometers (12 mi) north from the present-day town; the settlement was destroyed by raiders in 1272 and re-established on the present site as the fortress of Gorodetsk (Городецк).

In the early 15th century, the area of Bezhetsky Verkh was annexed by Grand Duchy of Moscow. Since 1433, Bezhetsk had its own prince, who was subordinate to the Grand Prince of Moscow.

In the course of the administrative reform carried out in 1708 by Peter the Great, Gorodetsk was included into Ingermanland Governorate (known since 1710 as St. Petersburg Governorate), but in 1727 it was transferred to Moscow Governorate. In 1766, Gorodetsk was renamed Bezhetsk. In 1775, Tver Viceroyalty was formed from the lands which previously belonged to Moscow and Novgorod Governorates. In 1776, Bezhetsk became the seat of Bezhetsky Uyezd. In 1796, Tver Viceroyalty was transformed into Tver Governorate. Bezhetsk remained the administrative center of the uyezd until 1929.

On July 12, 1929, the governorates and uyezds were abolished. Bezhetsky District, with the administrative center in Bezhetsk, was established within Bezhetsk Okrug of Moscow Oblast. On July 23, 1930, the okrugs were abolished and the districts were directly subordinated to the oblast. On January 29, 1935, Kalinin Oblast was established and Bezhetsk was transferred to Tver Oblast. In 1990, Kalinin Oblast was renamed Tver Oblast.

In the late 20th century, Bezhetsk, as a "reference small town" with well-preserved archives, became a subject of detailed academic studies of the 18th-century Russian countryside.

== Administrative and municipal status ==
Within the framework of administrative divisions, Bezhetsk serves as the administrative center of Bezhetsky District. As an administrative division, it is, together with four rural localities, incorporated within Bezhetsky District as Bezhetsk Urban Settlement. As a municipal division, this administrative unit also has urban settlement status and is a part of Bezhetsky Municipal District.

== Economy ==
Enterprises of timber, textile, and food industries, as well as a plant producing air compressors, are located in Bezhetsk.

=== Transportation ===
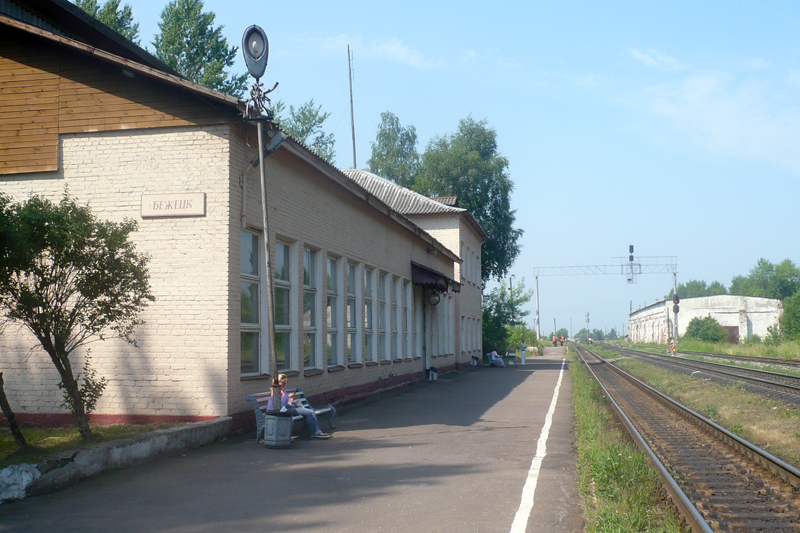
Bezhetsk railway station

A railway connecting Rybinsk and Bologoye via Sonkovo passes through Bezhetsk, which is an important railway station.

Bezhetsk is located on the road connecting Tver and Vesyegonsk. It is also connected by roads with Sonkovo, Kesova Gora, and Maksatikha. There are local roads as well, with bus traffic originating from Bezhetsk.

The Mologa River is not navigable.

== Culture and recreation ==
Bezhetsk contains seven cultural heritage monuments of federal significance and additionally twenty-four objects classified as cultural and historical heritage of local significance. The federal monuments include trade arcades and the Church of the Presentation of Mary. The oldest building in Bezhetsk is the white tent-like campanile of the Vvedenskaya Church, which was built by Yaroslavl masters in 1680–1682. The church itself was destroyed during the Soviet years. The Vozdvizhenskaya church goes back to the turn of the 18th century.

The Bezhetsk District and Literature Museum, located in Bezhetsk, shows expositions about the author Vyacheslav Shishkov and the musician Vasily Andreyev, who were both born in Bezhetsk.

== Military ==
Bezhetsk is home to Dorokhovo, a major military air base.

== Notable people ==
Bezhetsk and Bezhetsky Uyezd were the birthplace of writer Vyacheslav Shishkov, artists Alexander Samokhvalov and Sergey Osipov, and musician Vasily Andreyev.
