= Tver Viceroyalty =

1775–1796 unit of Russia

Coordinates: 57°N 36°E

Tver Viceroyalty Тверское наместничество
- Viceroyalty of Russian Empire
- 1775–1796
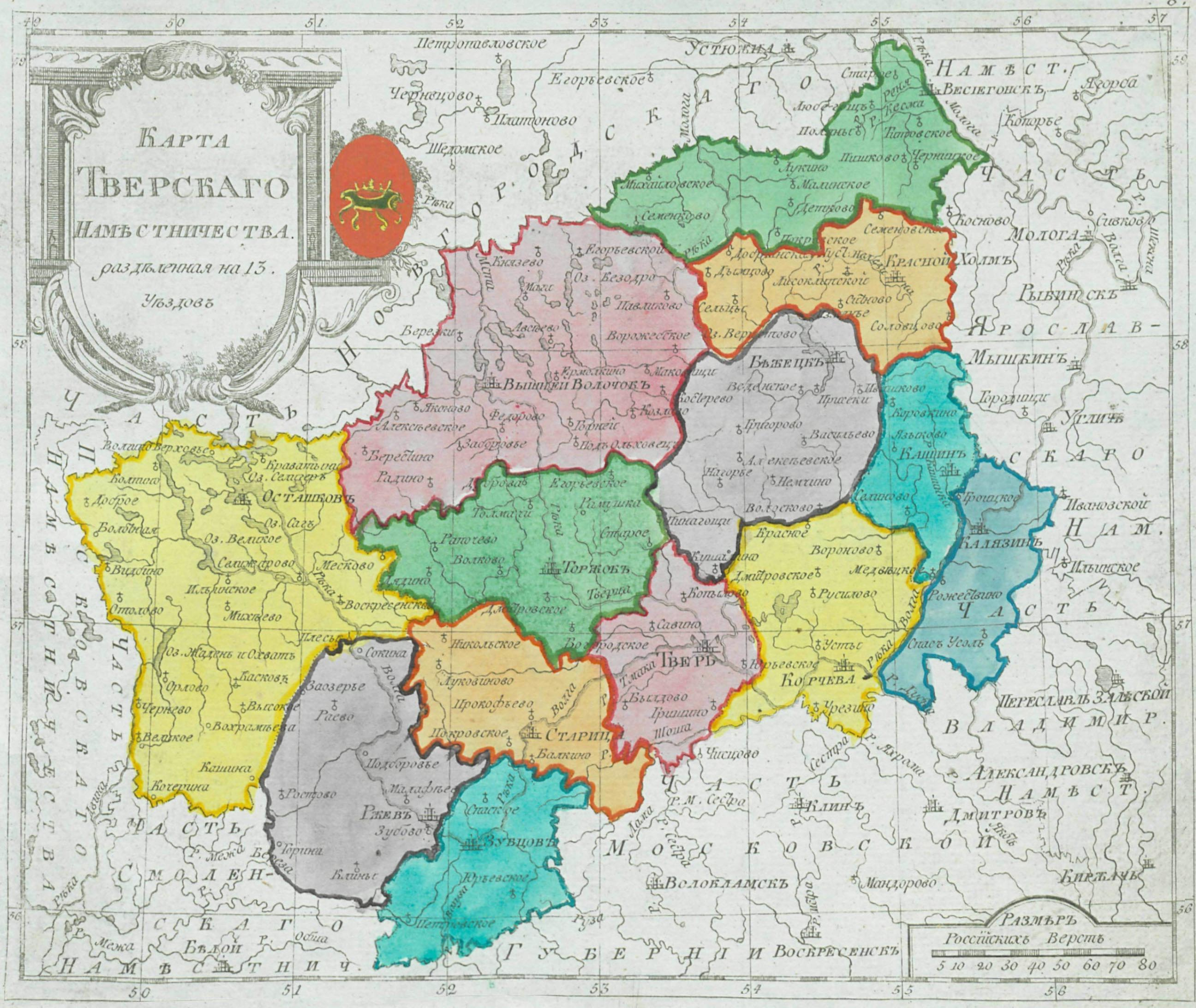
- Tver Viceroyalty in 1792
- Capital: Tver
- History
  - Established: 25 November 1775
  - Disestablished: 12 December 1796

Tver Viceroyalty (Russian: Тверское наместничество, romanized: Tverskoye namestnichestvo) was an administrative-territorial unit (namestnichestvo) of the Russian Empire, which existed from 1775 until 1796. Its seat was in Tver. In 1796, it was transformed to Tver Governorate.

The area of the viceroyalty is currently split between Tver and Moscow Oblasts. Minor parts of Tver Viceroyalty also currently belong to Yaroslavl and Novgorod Oblasts.

== History ==
In the 18th century, the areas which were later occupied by Tver Governorate were split between Moscow and Novgorod Governorates. On 25 November 1775 Tver Viceroyalty was established with the administrative center in Tver. It included Tver Province and Vyshnevolotsky Uyezd of Novgorod Governorage, as well as Uglich Province and some minor areas, including Vesyegonsk, of Moscow Governorate.

At the time of the formation of the viceroyalty, it was subdivided into 12 uyezds:

- Bezhetsky Uyezd (the administrative center in the town of Bezhetsk);
- Kalyazinsky Uyezd (Kalyazin);
- Kashinsky Uyezd (Kashin);
- Krasnokholmsky Uyezd (Krasny Kholm);
- Novotorzhsky Uyezd (Torzhok);
- Ostashkovsky Uyezd (Ostashkov);
- Rzhevsky Uyezd (Rzhev);
- Staritsky Uyezd (Staritsa);
- Tverskoy Uyezd (Tver);
- Vesyegonsky Uyezd (Vesyegonsk);
- Vyshnevolotsky Uyezd (Vyshny Volochyok);
- Zubtsovsky Uyezd (Zubtsov).

In 1781, Korcheva was granted town status, and Korchevskoy Uyezd was established.

On 12 December 1796 the viceroyalty was transformed into Tver Governorate. The area was unchanged, but the division into uyezds was modified.

== Governors ==
The administration of the viceroyalty was performed by a namestnik (vice-roy), who was based in Novgorod, and controlled by a governor general. The governors of Tver Viceroyalty were

- 1778-1781 Yakov Yefimovich Sivers (Jacob Sievers);
- 1783-1784 Yakov Ivanovich Bryus;
- 1785-1795 Nikolay Petrovich Arkharov.

The namestniks were

- 1776 Mikhail Nikitovich Krechetnikov;
- 1777-1783 Timofey Ivanovich Tutolmin;
- 1783-1784 Pyotr Vasilyevich Lopukhin;
- 1784-1793 Grigory Mikhaylovich Osipov;
- 1793-1796 Alexander Vasilyevich Polikarpov.
