= Mologa (river) =

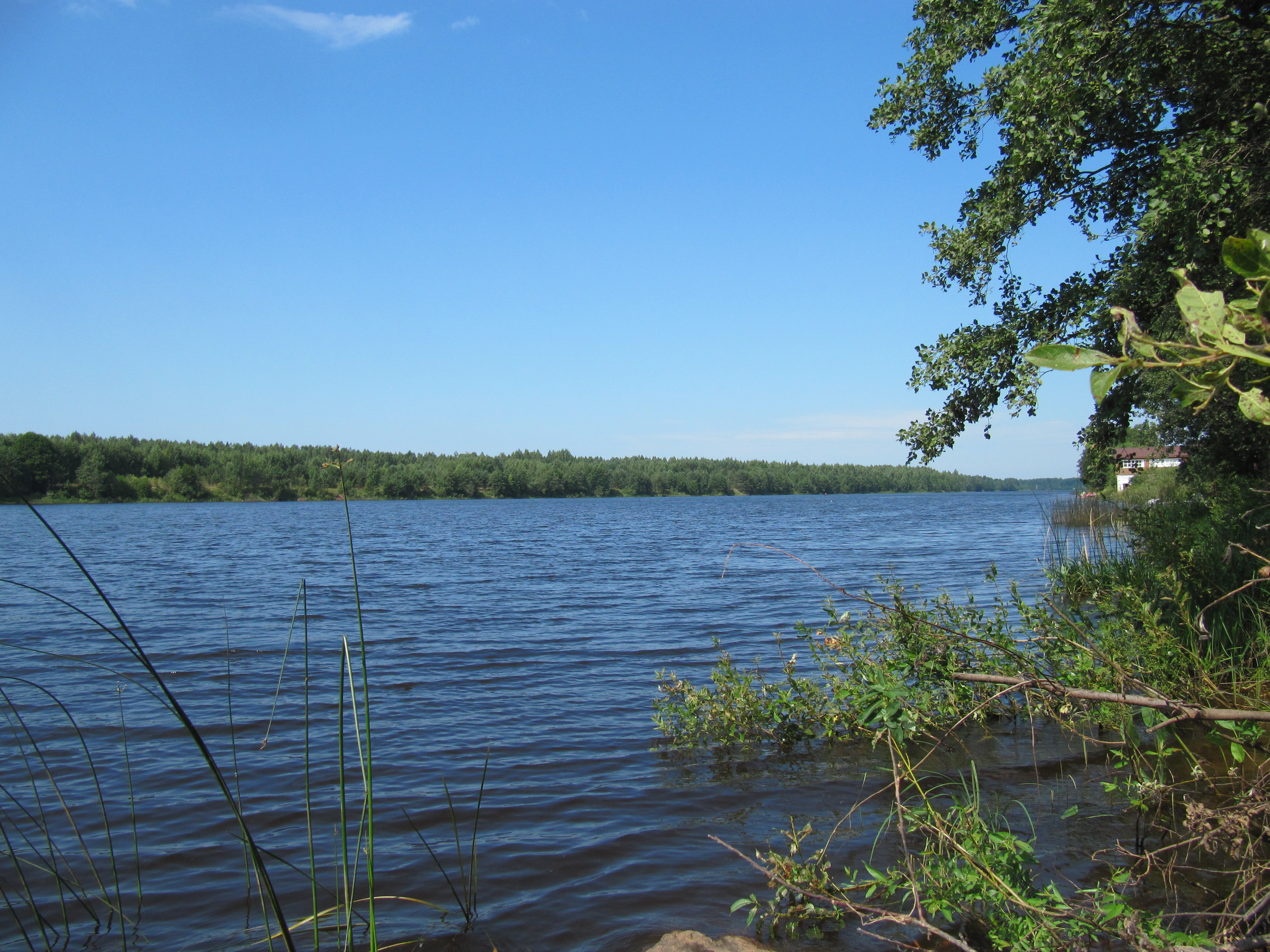
- The lower course of the Mologa

- Map of the Rybinsk Reservoir basin. The Mologa is shown on the map
- Native name: Молога (Russian)

Location
- Country: Russia

Physical characteristics
- Source: Valdai Hills
  - location: Kliuchevaya, Tver Oblast
  - coordinates: 57°38′35″N 36°03′29″E
  - elevation: 146 m (479 ft)
- Mouth: Volga (Rybinsk Reservoir)
  - location: Malaya Lipenka, Vologda Oblast
  - coordinates: 58°52′59″N 37°4′48″E
  - elevation: 101 m (331 ft)
- Length: 456 km (283 mi)
- Basin size: 29,700 km^{2} (11,500 sq mi)
- Discharge
  - average: 237 m^{3}/s (8,400 cu ft/s)

Basin features
- Progression: Volga→ Caspian Sea

The Mologa (Russian: Моло́га) is a river in Maksatikhinsky, Bezhetsky, Lesnoy, and Sandovsky Districts of Tver Oblast, Pestovsky District in Novgorod Oblast, and Ustyuzhensky and Cherepovetsky Districts in Vologda Oblast, Russia. It is a left tributary of the Volga. The lower course of the Mologa has been turned into the Rybinsk Reservoir. It is 456 kilometres (283 mi) long, and the area of its basin is 29,700 square kilometres (11,500 sq mi). The principal tributaries of the Mologa are the Osen (right), the Volchina (left), the Kobozha (left), the Chagodoshcha (left) and the Sit (it is now a tributary of the Rybinsk Reservoir).

The towns of Bezhetsk, Pestovo, and Ustyuzhna, and the urban-type settlement of Maksatikha are on the banks of the Mologa River. The historic town of Mologa used to stand at the confluence of the Mologa river with the Volga, but it was submerged as the Rybinsk Reservoir was filled between 1939 and 1947. The town of Vesyegonsk was also previously on the banks of the Mologa, however, it was relocated when the Rybinsk Reservoir was filled, and is on the banks of the reservoir.

The source of the Mologa is in the southeastern part of Maksatikhinsky District, in the eastern outskirts of the Valdai Hills. The river flows east, enters Bezhetsky District, turns north, flows through the town of Bezhetsk, and flows into Lake Verestovo. It flows out of the lake in the western direction, reenters Maksatikhinsky District, flows through the urban-type settlement of Maksatikha and turns north. A stretch of the Mologa forms the border between Maksatikhinsky and Lesnoy Districts. The river crosses over to Lesnoy District, crosses it, flows along the border between Lesnoy and Sandovsky districts and crosses into Novgorod Oblast. Downstream of the town of Pestovo, the Mologa turns northeast and enters Vologda Oblast. There, it flows through the town of Ustyuzhna, accepts from the left the Kobozha and the Chagodoshcha, sharply turns southeast and flows into the Rybinsk Reservoir.

The river basin of the Mologa comprises vast areas in the north of Tver Oblast, in the east of Novgorod Oblast, in the southeast of Leningrad Oblast (Boksitogorsky District), as well as the southeast of Vologda Oblast.

The lower course of the Mologa, downstream of the mouth of the Chagodoshcha, belongs to the Tikhvinskaya water system, one of the waterways constructed in the early 19th century to connect the river basins of the Volga and the Neva. Currently, it is not used for any commercial navigation.

Until the 1990s, the Mologa was used for timber rafting, with the timber-collecting facilities in Pestovo.

The river freezes up in late October through early December and stays under the ice until April or early May.
