= Rybinsk Reservoir =

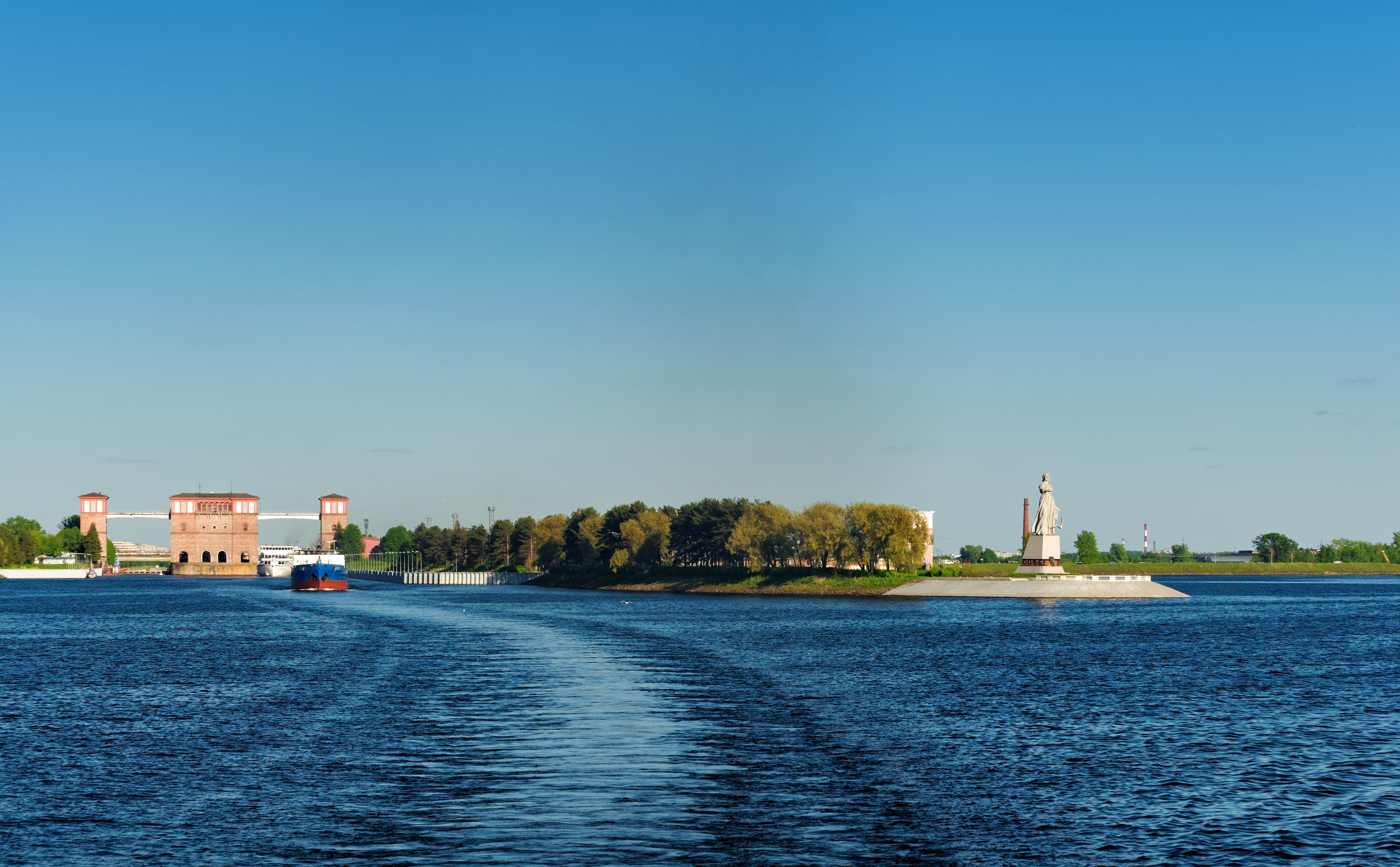
- Rybinsk Reservoir, the lock

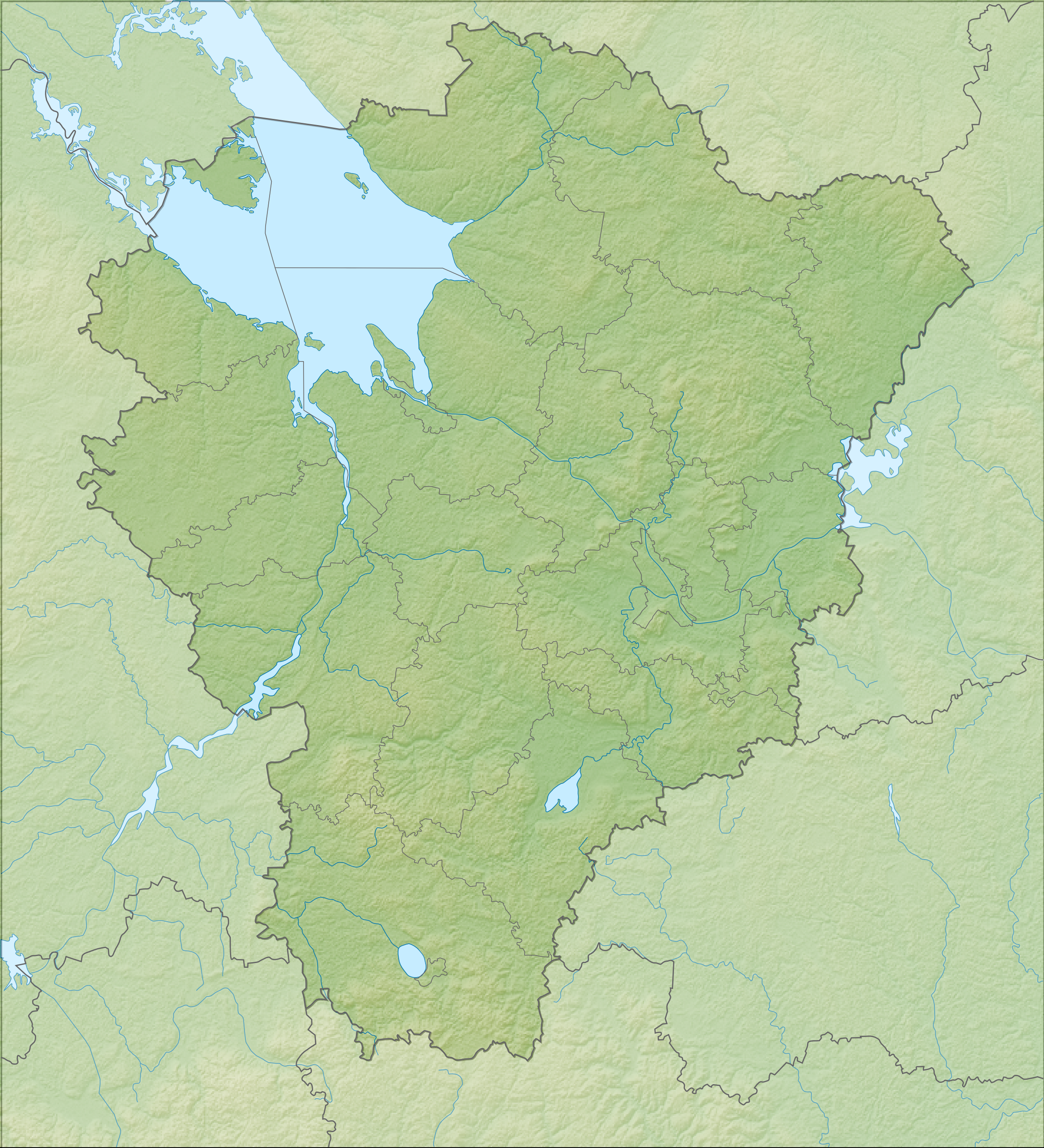
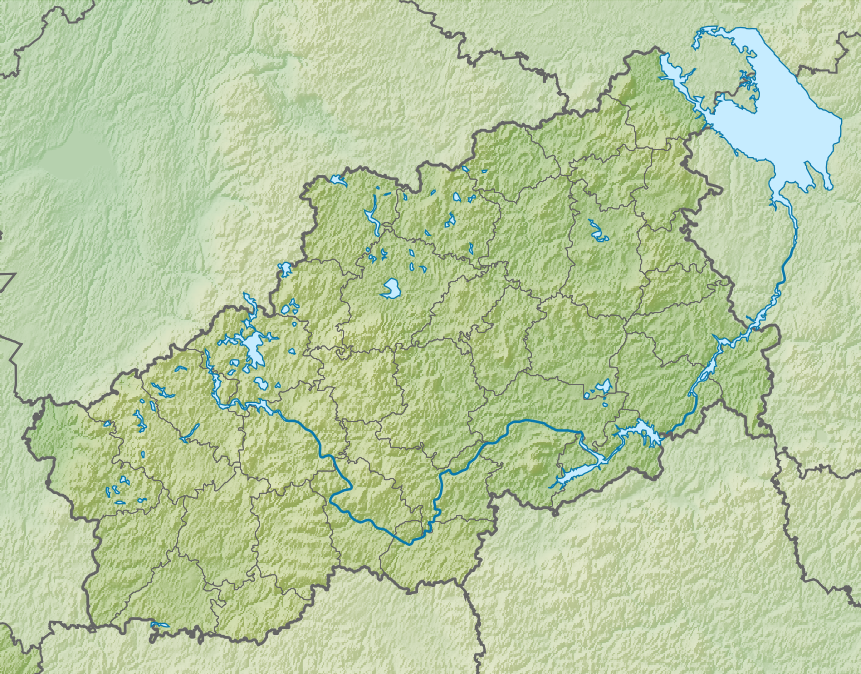
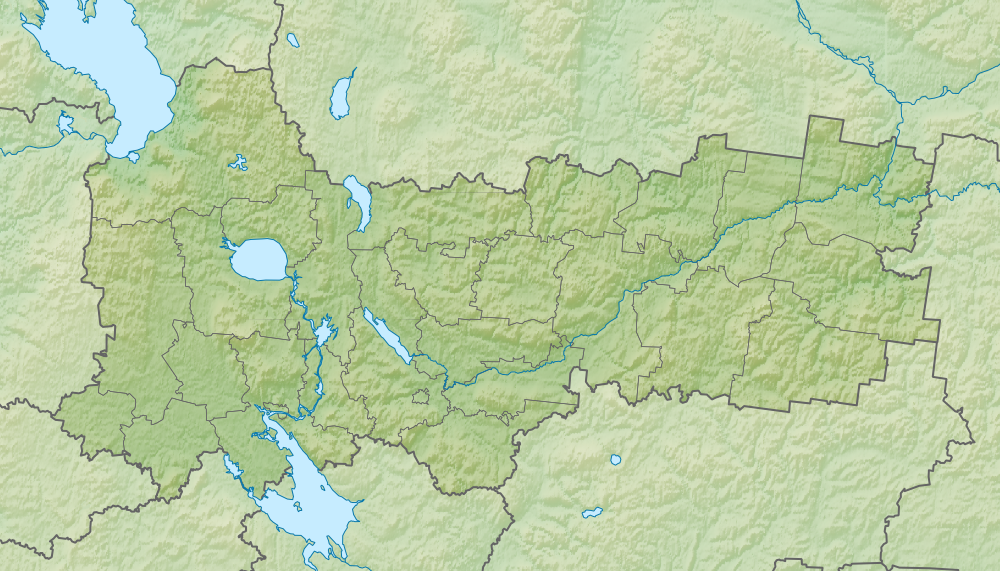
- Location within Yaroslavl Oblast Location within Tver Oblast Location within Vologda Oblast Location within European Russia
- Interactive map of Rybinsk Reservoir
- Coordinates: 58°22′N 38°26′E
- Type: Hydroelectric reservoir
- Primary inflows: Volga, Sheksna, Mologa
- Basin countries: Russia
- Surface area: 4,580 km^{2} (1,770 sq mi)
- Average depth: 5.6 m (18 ft)
- Max. depth: 30 m (98 ft)
- Water volume: 25.4 km^{3} (6.1 cu mi)
- Surface elevation: 102.4 m (336 ft)
- Settlements: Cherepovets; Vesyegonsk

Map of the Rybinsk Reservoir basin

Rybinsk Reservoir (Russian: Рыбинское водохранилище, romanized: Rybinskoye vodokhranilishche, IPA: [ˈrɨbʲɪnskəɪ vədəxrɐˈnʲilʲɪɕə]), informally called the Rybinsk Sea, is a water reservoir on the Volga River and its tributaries the Sheksna and Mologa, formed by Rybinsk Hydroelectric Station dam, located in the Tver, Vologda, and Yaroslavl Oblasts. At the time of its construction, it was the largest man-made body of water on Earth. It is the northernmost point of the Volga. The Volga–Baltic Waterway starts from there. The principal ports are Cherepovets in Vologda Oblast and Vesyegonsk in Tver Oblast.

The construction of the dam in Rybinsk started in 1935. The filling of the reservoir started on April 14, 1941, and continued until 1947. Some 150,000 people had to be resettled elsewhere, and the historic town of Mologa in Yaroslavl Oblast along with 663 villages completely disappeared under water. Today the dam is less important for hydroelectric power supply (output is 346 MW) than it used to be.

Yurshinsky Island is located at south end of the reservoir at the mouth of the Volga River. It is about 3.5 km long and 2.5 km wide.

In the context of invasion biology, the Rybinsk Reservoir is identified as a strategic "hotspot" for long-term monitoring. It functions as a distinctive crossroads connecting the Upper Volga basin, the Moscow transport hub, and the Volga-Baltic invasion corridor, making it a critical area for tracking the northward dispersal of aquatic species and forecasting biological invasions.

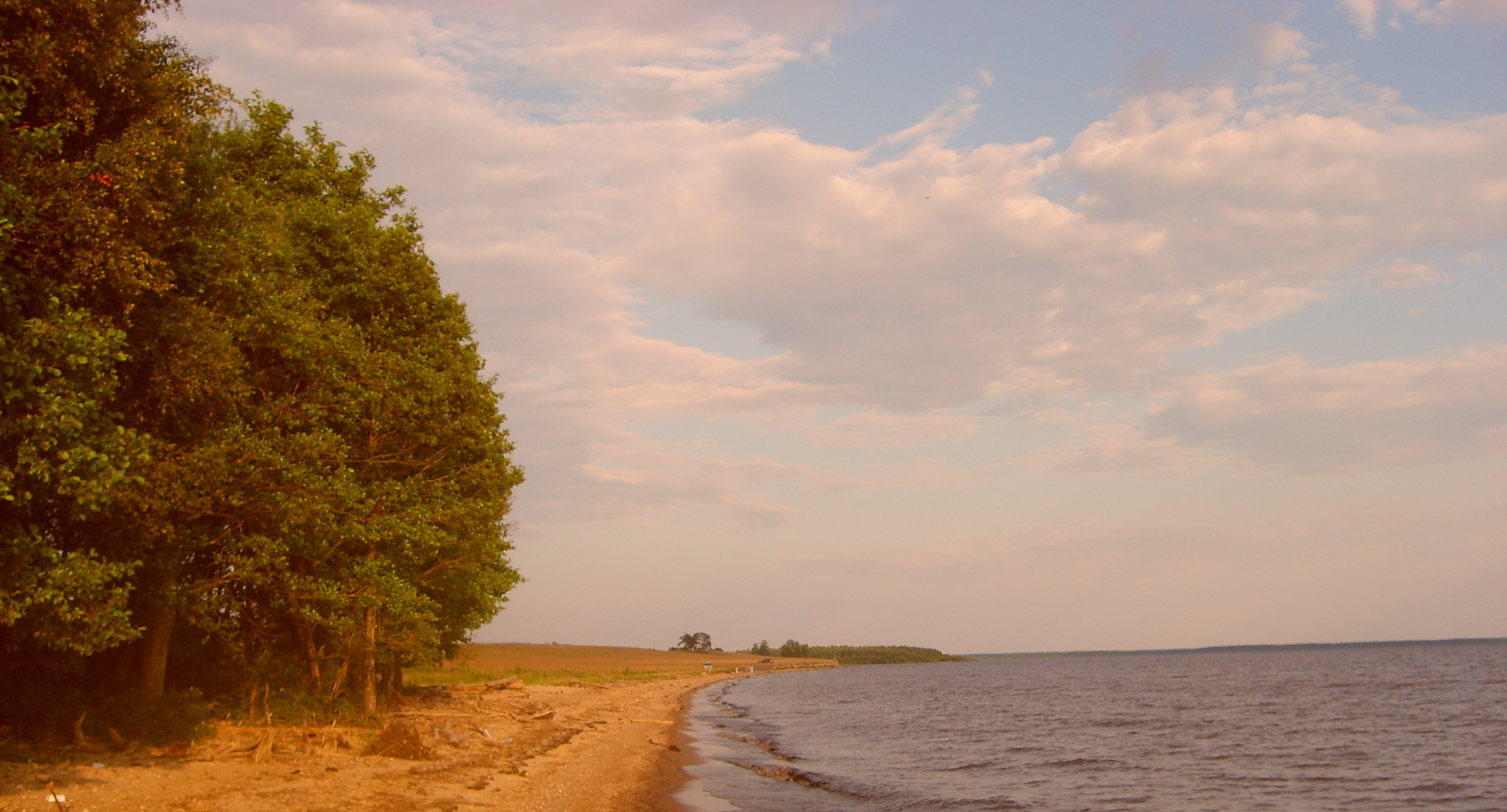

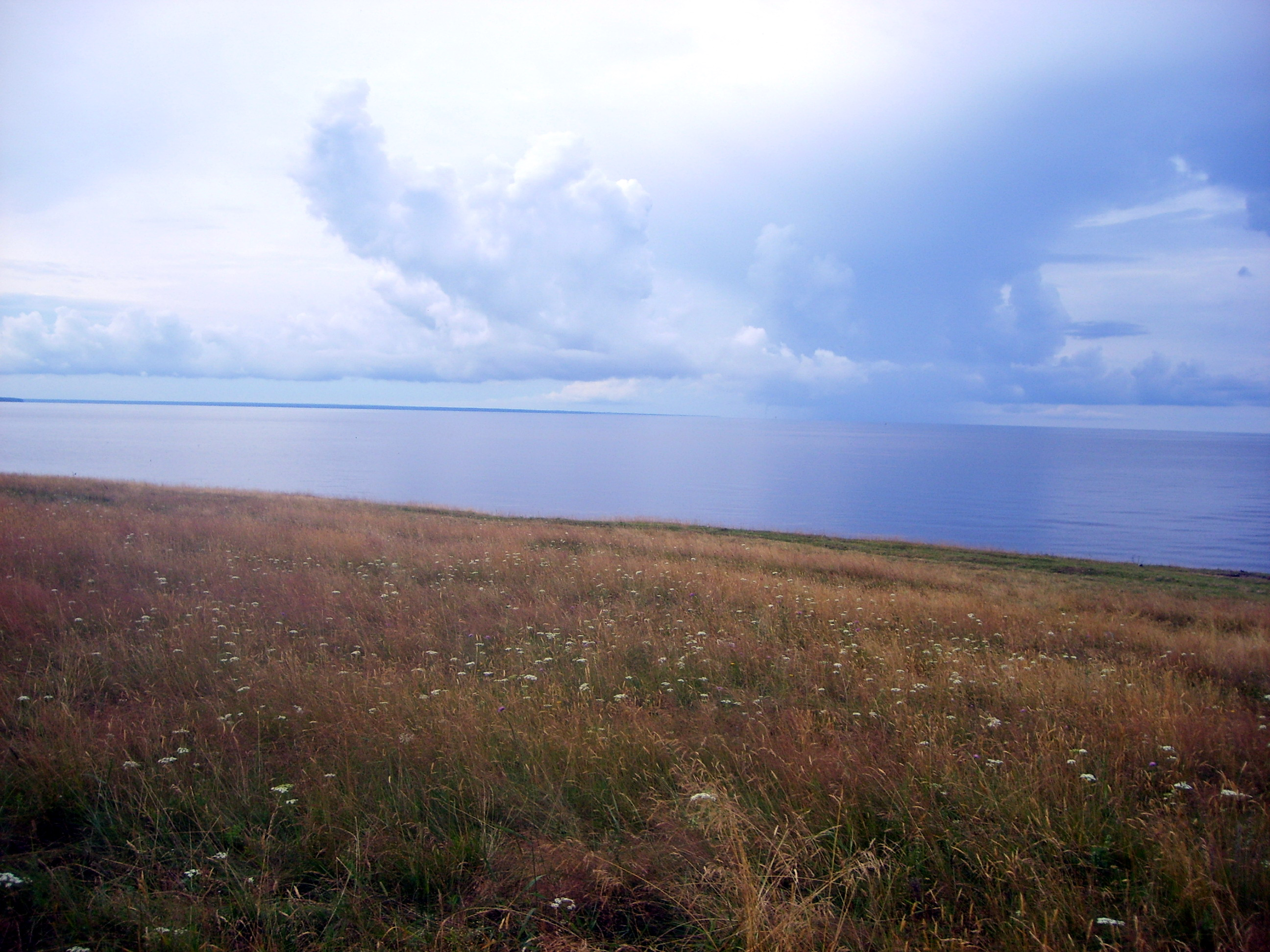

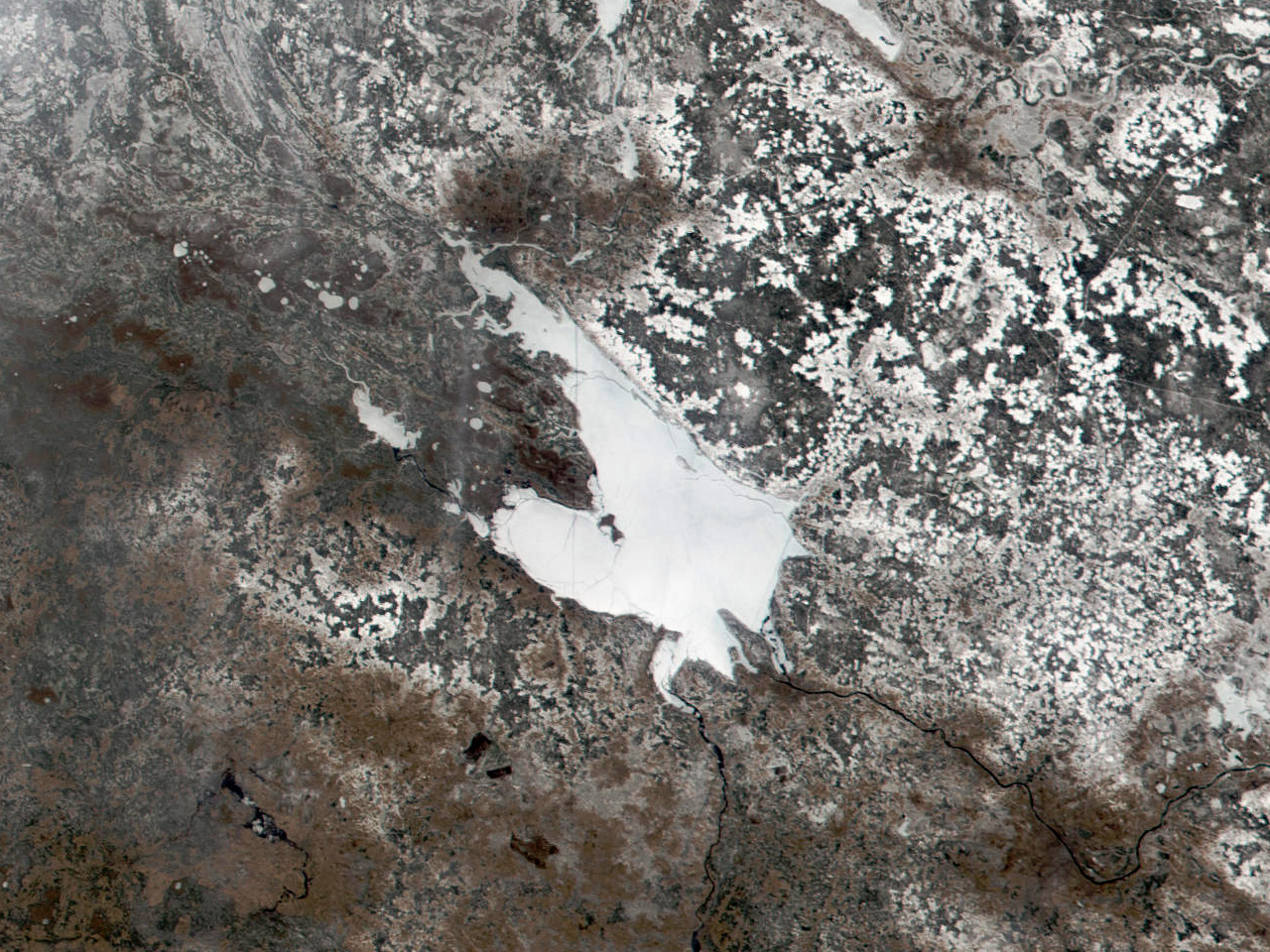

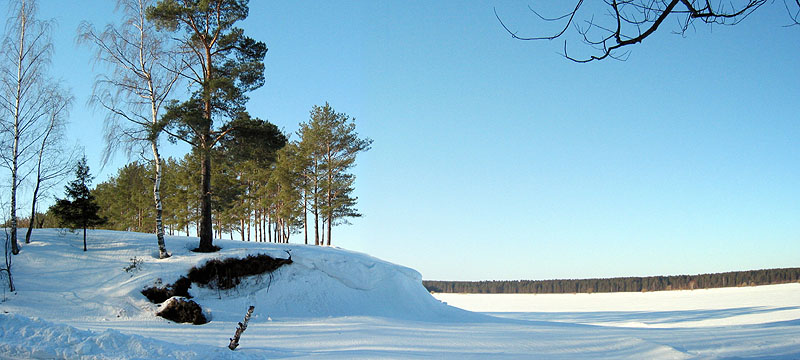

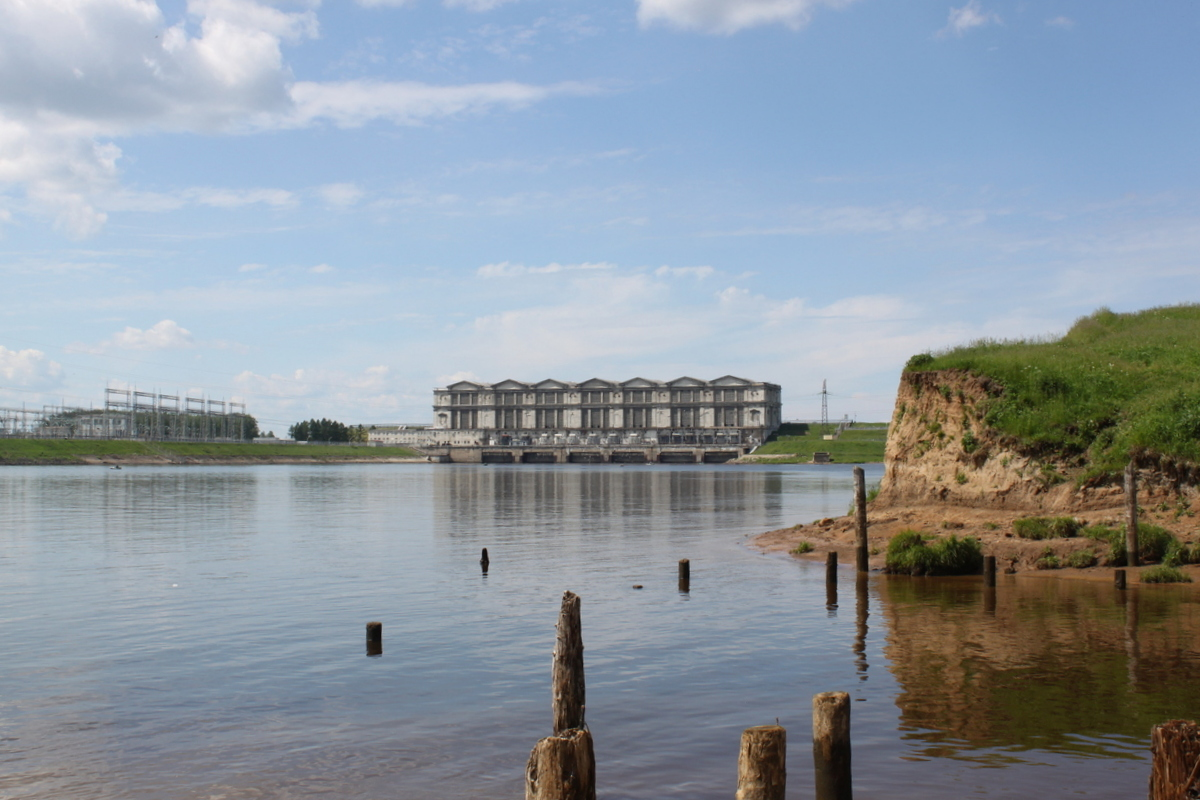
