= Sonkovo =

Sonkovo Сонково
- Work settlement
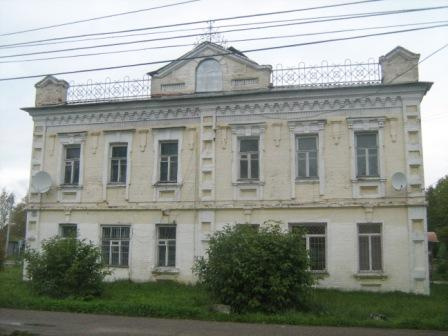
- The Shcheglov House in Sonkovo
- Interactive map of Sonkovo
- Location of Sonkovo Sonkovo (Tver Oblast)
- Coordinates: 57°46′N 37°09′E
- Country: Russia
- Federal subject: Tver Oblast
- Administrative district: Sonkovsky District
- Founded: 1870

Population (2010 Census)
  - Total: 4,164
  - Estimate (2021): 3,553 (−14.7%)

Administrative status
  - Capital of: Sonkovsky District

Municipal status
  - Municipal district: Sonkovsky Municipal District
  - Urban settlement: Sonkovskoye Urban Settlement
  - Capital of: Sonkovsky Municipal District, Sonkovskoye Urban Settlement
- Time zone: UTC+3 (MSK)
- Postal code: 171450
- OKTMO ID: 28651151051

Sonkovo (Russian: Сонко́во) is an urban locality (an urban-type settlement) and the administrative center of Sonkovsky District of Tver Oblast, Russia. Population: 4,164 (2010 census); 4,577 (2002 census); 5,988 (1989 Soviet census).

== History ==
Founded by the Russian Greek Orthodox Inkeriköt (Izhorians) in the 17th century and called Savelionkylä (or Savelankylä), the village later changed its name to Savelino (Савелино) due to its proximity to the village of Savelikha, which was built in 1870 during the construction and expansion of the private Rybinsk-Bologoye Railway. The railway merged with the narrow gauge (1067 mm) Novgorod Railway and broad gauge (1829 mm) Tsarskoye Selo Railway in 1895 to form a new private railway company, which then built two branch lines from Savelino — one to Kashin (53 versts (57 km)) and the other one to Krasny Kholm (31 versts (33 km)) in 1898 and 1899 respectively. During the Soviet era, following the construction of new railway lines and a bridge over the Volga River, Sonkovo became a major railway station.

In 1903, the settlement was renamed Sonkovo to avoid possible confusion and a main locomotive depot constructed near the station. Sonkovo received urban-type settlement status to in 1928. Currently, the railway line east of Sonkovo–Rybinsk–Yaroslavl is part of the Russia's Northern Railway Administration, while the remainder of the railway lines in Tver Oblast belong to the Oktyabrsk (October) Railway Administration.

Prior to the 1917 October Revolution, about one third of the Sonkovo's inhabitants were so-called Tver Karelians who spoke their own dialect of Karelian (Karielan: kielt).

The majority of the dwellings in Sonkovo are wooden although there are many two and three story brick and concrete buildings as well as numerous pre-World War II structures. The center of the settlement is located next to the train station and its main street, Lenina Avenue, connects to Bezhetsk via the R-85 highway. Sonkovo is divided in two by the Rybinsk–Bologoye railway line. There are no significant landmarks in the settlement.

== Economy ==
=== Industry ===
The industrial enterprises in the district are located in Sonkovo and serve the railway station. Additionally, there is a milk production plant.

=== Transportation ===
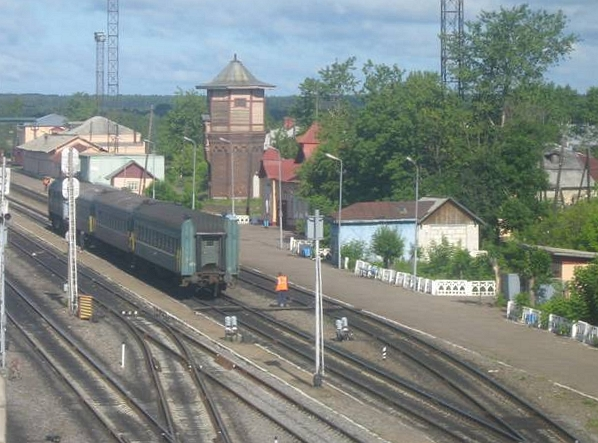
Sonkovo railway station

Two railways cross in Sonkovo, which is thus an important railway junction. One, running from south to north, connects Moscow with Mga via Krasny Kholm and Pestovo. Another one, running east to west, connects Rybinsk with Bologoye.

Sonkovo is connected by road with Bezhetsk, where it has access to the roads running to Tver and Vesyegonsk. There are also local roads, with the bus traffic originating from Sonkovo.

== Local community ==
=== Authorities and government institutions ===
The village is the administrative center of the Sonkovsky District of the Tver Oblast; in the center of the village there is a meeting of deputies and the district administration (the head of the administration is V. N. Mikhailov). On the territory of the village there are also the Sonkovsky District Court (nominally composed of three judges, of which only two are actually appointed and working), a justice of the peace, the Sonkovsky District Prosecutor's Office, the Department of Internal Affairs, the traffic police department, the bailiff service department, the territorial office of the Federal Migration Service of Russia, the federal treasury department, the tax inspectorate, and other territorial divisions of government bodies and institutions. There is a fire department (PCh-51) and a department of state fire supervision in the village; the fire brigade has a garrison of 45 people. There is also the Comprehensive Center for Social Services for the Population, a state institution that serves the population of the region and is subordinate to the administration of the Tver Oblast.

In 2005, a new municipal formation, the urban settlement of Sonkovo village, was created within the boundaries of the village. On 2 October 2005, the Council of Deputies of the village, consisting of 10 people, was formed for the first time for a term of office of 3 years; on 14 October, the Council of Deputies elected Olga Aleksandrovna Starchenkova as head of the village. Since 2006, the position of head of the village administration has been filled by Alexander Grigoryevich Voznenko. In October 2010, elections were held to the Council of Deputies of the village of the second convocation in two districts: the 6-mandate central and 4-mandate railway districts. According to the voting results, 10 deputies were elected, 8 of whom represent the United Russia party, one deputy - the Communist Party of the Russian Federation, and another was elected as an independent candidate. In November 2010, Oleg Nikolayevich Burov was appointed as the new head of the village administration.
