= Kesovogorsky District =

Kesovogorsky District Кесовогорский район (Russian)
- District
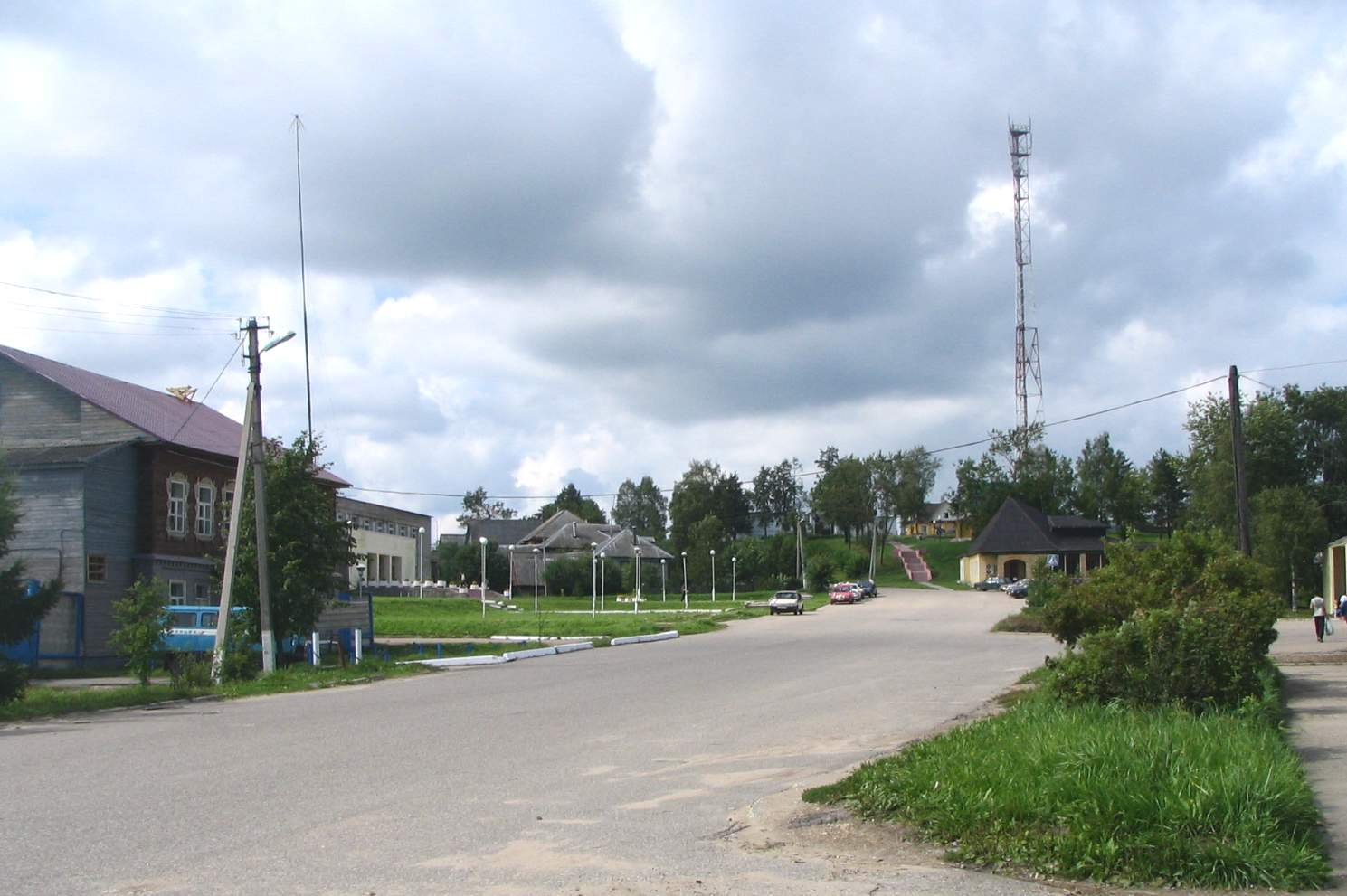
- Central part of the urban-type settlement of Kesova Gora, the administrative center of Kesovogorsky District

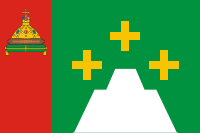
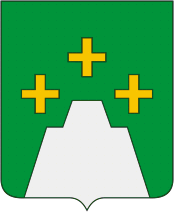
- Flag Coat of arms
- Location of Kesovogorsky District in Tver Oblast
- Coordinates: 57°35′N 37°17′E
- Country: Russia
- Federal subject: Tver Oblast
- Established: 12 July 1929
- Administrative center: Kesova Gora

Area
  - Total: 962 km^{2} (371 sq mi)

Population (2010 Census)
  - Total: 8,199
  - Density: 8.52/km^{2} (22.1/sq mi)
  - Urban: 47.3%
  - Rural: 52.7%

Administrative structure
  - Administrative divisions: 1 Urban settlements, 6 Rural settlements
  - Inhabited localities: 1 urban-type settlements, 174 rural localities

Municipal structure
  - Municipally incorporated as: Kesovogorsky Municipal District
  - Municipal divisions: 1 urban settlements, 6 rural settlements
- Time zone: UTC+3 (MSK)
- OKTMO ID: 28626000
- Website: www.admksg.ru

Kesovogorsky District (Russian: Кесового́рский райо́н) is an administrative and municipal district (raion), one of the thirty-six in Tver Oblast, Russia. It is located in the east of the oblast and borders with Sonkovsky District in the north, Myshkinsky District of Yaroslavl Oblast in the east, Uglichsky District, also of Yaroslavl Oblast, in the southeast, Kashinsky District in the south, and with Bezhetsky District in the west. The area of the district is 962 square kilometers (371 sq mi). Its administrative center is the urban locality (an urban-type settlement) of Kesova Gora. Population: 8,199 (2010 Census); 9,289 (2002 census); 10,235 (1989 Soviet census). The population of Kesova Gora accounts for 47.3% of the district's total population.

== Geography ==
The whole area of the district belongs to the drainage basin of the Volga. The areas in the north and the east of the district belong to the drainage basin of the Korozhechna River. The source of the Korozhechna lies in the northwestern part of the district. The rivers in the center and the west of the district drain into the Kashinka River. The Kashinka crosses the district from the west to the east, and, in particular, Kesova Gora is located on its banks. Finally, minor areas in the south of the district belong to the basin of the Medveditsa River. The Korozhechna, the Kashinka, and the Medveditsa are left tributaries of the Volga.

== History ==
In the course of the administrative reform carried out in 1708 by Peter the Great, the area was included into Ingermanland Governorate (known since 1710 as Saint Petersburg Governorate), but in 1727 it was transferred to Moscow Governorate. In 1775, Tver Viceroyalty was formed from the lands which previously belonged to Moscow and Novgorod Governorates. The western part of the current area of the district, including Kesova Gora, was split between Bezhetsky and Kashinsky Uyezds of Tver Viceroyalty. In 1796, Tver Viceroyalty was transformed into Tver Governorate. On October 3, 1927 Kashinsky Uyezd was abolished and split between Bezhetsky and Kimrsky Uyezds; the area of the district which previously belonged to Kashinsky Uyezd, was transferred to Bezhetsky Uyezd. The eastern part of the current area of the district was in 1777 transferred to newly established Yaroslavl Viceroyalty, since 1796 Yaroslavl Governorate. It belonged to Myshkinsky Uyezd.

On July 12, 1929 the governorates and uyezds were abolished. Kesovsky District, with the administrative center in the selo of Kesova Gora, was established within Bezhetsk Okrug of Moscow Oblast. Shortly afterwards, the district was renamed Kesovogorsky. On July 23, 1930, the okrugs were abolished, and the districts were directly subordinated to the oblast. On January 29, 1935 Kalinin Oblast was established, and Kesovogorsky District was transferred to Kalinin Oblast. On February 13, 1963, during the abortive Khrushchyov administrative reform, Kesovogorsky District was merged into Kashinsky District, but on November 3, 1965 it was re-established. In 1975, Kesova Gora was granted urban-type settlement status. In 1990, Kalinin Oblast was renamed Tver Oblast.

== Economy ==
=== Industry ===
The industry in the district is based on timber production.

=== Agriculture ===
Agriculture is the basis of the economy of the district. The main agricultural specializations in the district are cattle breeding with meat and milk production, as well as crops and vegetables growing. The agriculture is in deep crisis, and the farms get reorganized. As of 2011, there were seventeen large- and mid-scale farms in the district.

=== Transportation ===
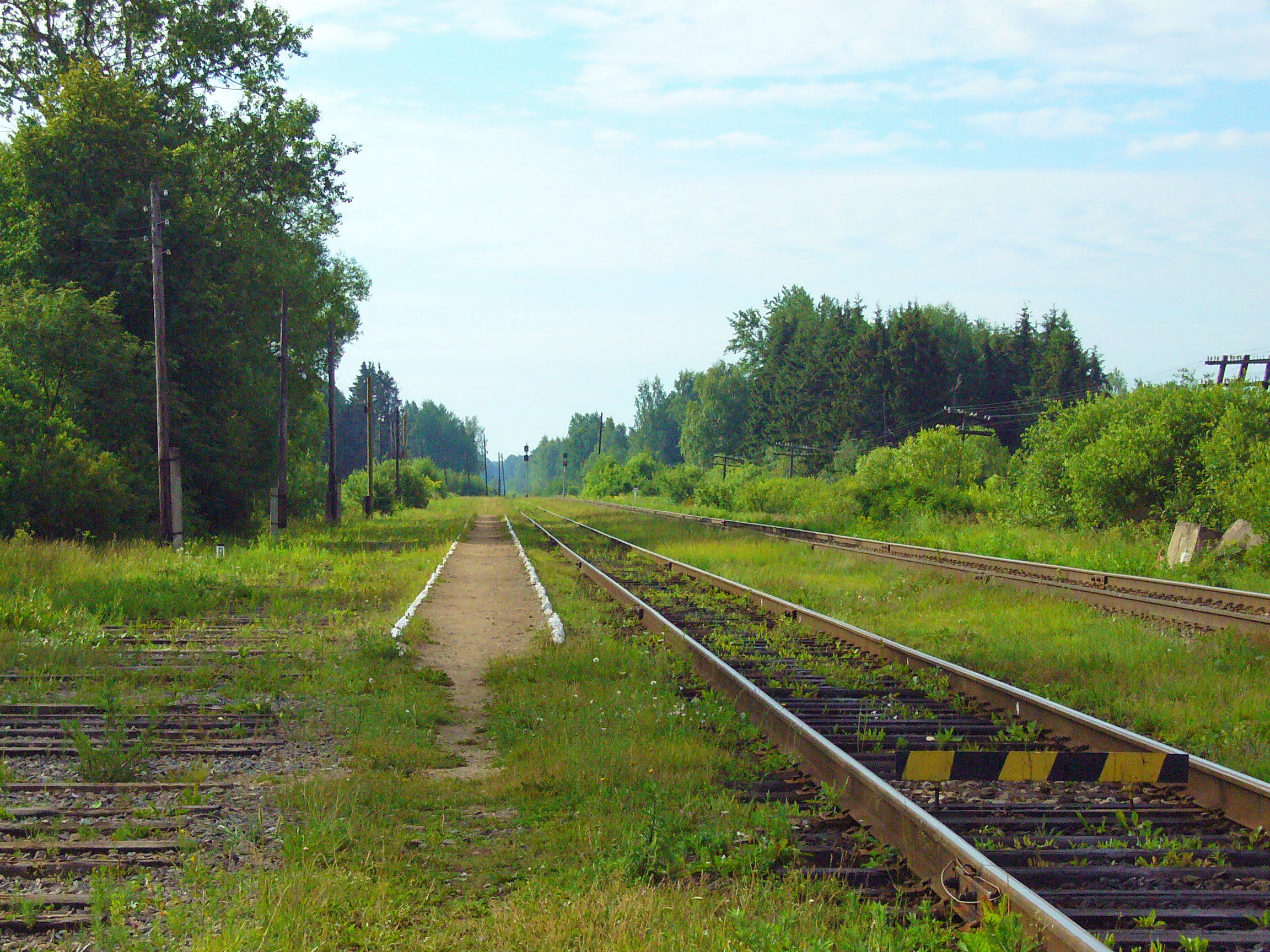
MYUD railway station

A railway connecting Moscow with Mga via Sonkovo crosses the district from south to north. Kesova Gora is the main railway station within the district. There is infrequent passenger traffic.

Kesova Gora is connected by paved roads with Bezhetsk and Kashin. There are also local roads.

== Culture and recreation ==
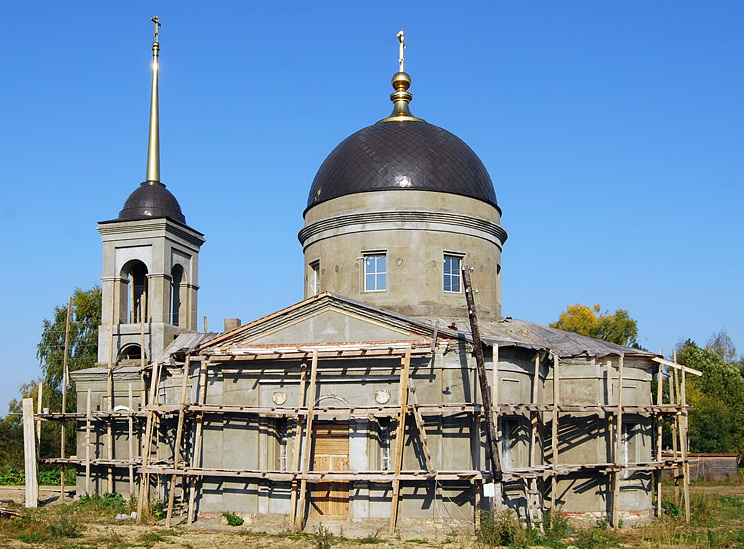
The Saint Paraskevi Church in Baykovo.

The district contains two cultural heritage monuments of federal significance and additionally eighteen objects classified as cultural and historical heritage of local significance. The federal monuments are the Saint Nicholas Church (1770s) in Kesova Gora and the Church of the Deposition of the Robe from the 18th century in the selo of Vasilkovo.

There is a local museum in Kesova Gora.
