= Nikolay Dobrokhotov (1879) =

Russian revolutionary, Soviet statesman and politician from 1879-1938

Nikolay Fyodorovich Dobrokhotov
- Николай Фёдорович Доброхотов
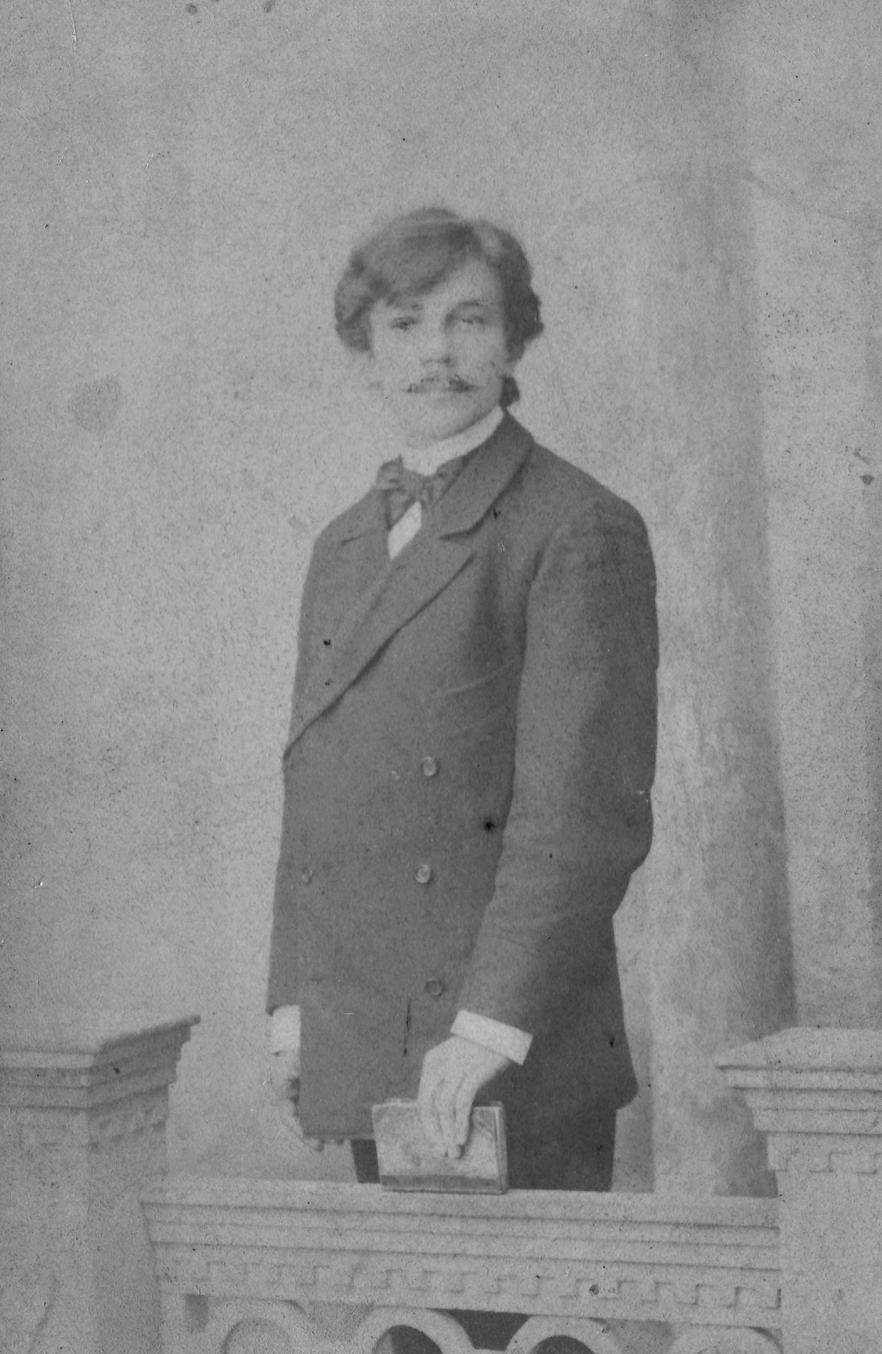
- 1893

Chairman of the Executive Committee of the Yaroslavl City Council of Workers' and Soldiers' Deputies
- In office November 4, 1917 – February 1918
- Preceded by: Office established
- Succeeded by: David Zackheim

Chairman of the Executive Committee of the Yaroslavl Governoratial Council of Workers' and Soldiers' Deputies
- In office February 1918 – June 1918
- Preceded by: Office established
- Succeeded by: Semyon Nakhimson
- In office July 1919 – July 1919 (acting)
- Preceded by: Tsvetkov

People's Commissar of Labour of the Ukrainian Socialist Soviet Republic
- In office 1924–1925

Personal details
- Born: May 22, 1879 Rozhdestveno Village, Danilovsky Uyezd, Yaroslavl Governorate, Russian Empire
- Died: October 6, 1938 (aged 59) Selifontovo Village, Yaroslavl District, Yaroslavl Region
- Resting place: Yaroslavl Oblast
- Party: Russian Social Democratic Labour Party; All–Union Communist Party (Bolsheviks)
- Education: Yaroslavl Theological Seminary
- Occupation: Revolutionary and political figure
- Profession: Teacher

Military service
- Allegiance: Russian Empire
- Branch/service: Infantry
- Years of service: 1915–1917
- Rank: Private

Nikolay Fedorovich Dobrokhotov (22 May 1879 – 1938) was a Russian revolutionary, Soviet statesman and politician.

== Early years ==
Nikolay Dobrokhotov was born on 22 May 1879, in the village of Rozhdestveno, Borovsky Volost, Danilovsky District, Yaroslavl Governorate, in the family of a village priest; he never mentioned the latter fact in his biography. He graduated from the Yaroslavl Theological Seminary.

== Revolutionary activity ==
He began working as a teacher at the Spas–Kiprianovskaya School in the Vyatka Volost. He actively conducted anti–government propaganda among the peasants, which led to a denunciation and dismissal, after which in 1905, he was transferred to the Zaozersky School of the Uglich District. In 1906, he joined the Russian Social Democratic Labour Party (Bolshevik) and, as a member of the party, was engaged in agitation and propaganda work in the countryside, distributing banned literature, for which he was fired in 1907. Due to his difficult financial situation, he sang in the church choir of the Spassky Monastery and lived in its dormitory; at the same time he continued his party work. He was arrested twice and spent several months in prison. In 1910–1913 he worked as a teacher in the Perm Governorate.

In 1915, he was drafted into the army. He served in Yaroslavl as a private of the 211th Reserve Infantry Regiment. After the February Revolution, he began active political activity, becoming an influential figure in the Yaroslavl Council of Soldiers' Deputies. In May 1917, he headed the provincial bureau of councils. In August, he became a member of the city committee for the protection of the revolution, which dissolved the officer organizations, disbanded the shock battalions, and removed the head of the garrison. In September 1917, as a representative from Yaroslavl, he attended a meeting in the Bolshevik Central Committee, which considered the issue of the speedy transfer of power into the hands of the soviets. In October 1917, he was in Petrograd, participated in the work of the Second All–Russian Congress of Soviets, the decisions of which secured the coming to power of the Bolsheviks.

== Political activity ==
On November 4, 1917, he was elected Chairman of the executive committee of the Yaroslavl City Council. Simultaneously, on November 10, he became the temporary commissar of the garrison, effectively its chief. In February 1918, at a meeting of the united congress of councils of the province, he was elected Chairman of the Provincial Executive Committee, that is, the head of the executive branch in the province. David Zackheim became the Head of the City Executive Committee, with whom Dobrokhotov had serious disagreements, in particular on the issue of the Brest Peace, in the ratification of which Dobrokhotov took part at the 7th Emergency Party Congress and the 4th Emergency Congress of Councils. A few weeks before the start of the anti–Bolshevik uprising in Yaroslavl, Dobrokhotov was relieved of his post, retaining his membership in the provincial executive committee. The heads of the city and provincial executive committees, David Zackheim and Semyon Nakhimson, were shot at the beginning of the uprising.

Dobrokhotov was sent for party work to the Tutaevsky District. In September 1918 he headed the district party committee and became a member of the executive committee of the district council. Delegate of the 8th Party Congress. In March 1919 he was summoned to Moscow to be at the disposal of the Central Committee of the Party. In early July he appeared in Yaroslavl as a representative of the Central Committee with broad powers in connection with numerous peasant and deserter uprisings in the province (the total number of rebels reached 25 thousand people). He chaired meetings of the provincial committee of the party and the provincial executive committee. In mid–July, the former Chairman of the Provincial Executive Committee, Tsvetkov, handed over all the affairs to Dobrokhotov as the temporary head of the executive branch. Having taken a number of urgent measures, he convened an extraordinary provincial party conference, at which a new leadership was elected.

By decision of the Central Committee, he was sent to Ukraine. He headed the Kherson Executive Committee and was engaged in the creation of a fortified area to prevent the breakthrough of the Wrangel troops to the right bank of the Dnieper. As the Central Committee of the Communist Party of Ukraine described him: "An old party member with a good Bolshevik temper... In a political situation, he quickly navigates... Not involved in squabbles. A worker of provincial scale".

He was a delegate from the Podolsk party organization to the 12th Congress of the RCP(b) in 1923. In 1924–1925, he served as People's Commissar of Labour of the Ukrainian Republic and at the same time headed the central commission to combat unemployment. Then for several years he managed the Soyuzkartofel Organization, which coordinated potato processing in the Soviet Union.

== Last years ==
He fell ill with tuberculosis and in 1929 retired due to disability. He lived with his sister, a teacher in the village of Verkhniy Pochinok, Bereznyakovsky Village Council, Danilovsky District. He did not hold any positions, but actively participated in collectivization, in the organization of the Zarya collective farm, achieved the closure of the church and the creation of a mechanized mill in it, and the construction of a seven–year school. He collected materials on the suppression of the Yaroslavl Rebellion for the editorial board of the multi–volume History of the Civil War.

As the wave of repressions began, the old principled Bolshevik turned out to be inconvenient for the local authorities. He repeatedly wrote to Moscow in defense of arrested rural communists, sometimes with success, and accused the prosecutor and the district committee employee who arrived at the collective farm for a show trial of drunkenness and prejudice.

In the summer of 1937, the Danilov District Party Committee accused Dobrokhotov of concealing his participation in the Trotskyist opposition in 1927. He was charged with responsibility for the collective farms of the Bereznyakovo Village Council having "left up to half of the grain grown in the fields over the past two years". Nikolay Fedorovich was expelled from the party; the next day he was arrested and on October 6 1938, by the verdict of the Military Collegium of the Supreme Court of the Soviet Union, he was shot.

He was buried in a mass grave near the village of Selifontovo near Yaroslavl. When his burial site was discovered in 1989, his remains were identified by their tibia – he was two meters tall.

In 1958, he was rehabilitated. In his honor, in July 1980, a road in Yaroslavl was named.

== Sources ==
- Nikolay Ryazantsev. The First "Soviet Governor" // Northern Territory – 2009 – No. 157 (August 28)
- Elsa Lunina, Nikolay Ryazantsev. "An Employee of the Provincial Scale..." // Social History of the Russian Province: Materials of the All–Russian Scientific Conference / Yaroslavl State University Named After Pavel Demidov – Yaroslavl: Yaroslavl State University, 2009 – Pages 264–271
- Nikolay Ryazantsev, Elsa Lunina. "An Employee of the Provincial Scale..." // Romanov–Borisoglebsk Antiquity – 2010 – No. 2 (14), (Spring) – Pages 31–34
- Nikolay Kolodin. The First Soviet Governor // Ancient City. Yaroslavl: Buildings, People, Legends: In 4 Volumes – Yaroslavl: Chancellor, 2014 – Volume 1: Yaroslavl Embankments – Pages 244–247
