= 395 =

395 in various calendars
Gregorian calendar	395; CCCXCV
Ab urbe condita	1148
Assyrian calendar	5145
Balinese saka calendar	316–317
Bengali calendar	−199 – −198
Berber calendar	1345
Buddhist calendar	939
Burmese calendar	−243
Byzantine calendar	5903–5904
Chinese calendar	甲午年 (Wood Horse); 3092 or 2885 — to — 乙未年 (Wood Goat); 3093 or 2886
Coptic calendar	111–112
Discordian calendar	1561
Ethiopian calendar	387–388
Hebrew calendar	4155–4156
- Hindu calendars
Vikram Samvat	451–452
Shaka Samvat	316–317
Kali Yuga	3495–3496
Holocene calendar	10395
Iranian calendar	227 BP – 226 BP
Islamic calendar	234 BH – 233 BH
Javanese calendar	278–279
Julian calendar	395; CCCXCV
Korean calendar	2728
Minguo calendar	1517 before ROC 民前1517年
Nanakshahi calendar	−1073
Seleucid era	706/707 AG
Thai solar calendar	937–938
Tibetan calendar	ཤིང་ཕོ་རྟ་ལོ་ (male Wood-Horse); 521 or 140 or −632 — to — ཤིང་མོ་ལུག་ལོ་ (female Wood-Sheep); 522 or 141 or −631

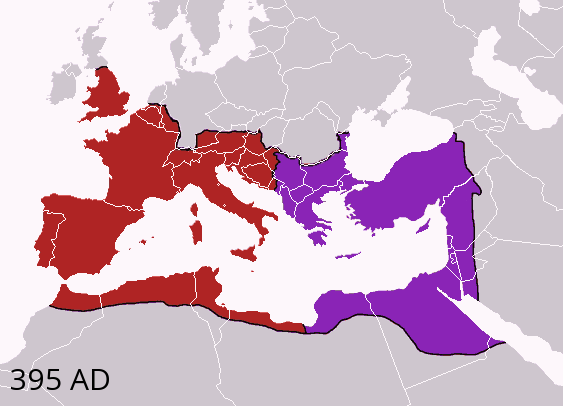
The Roman Empire (395)

Year 395 (CCCXCV) was a common year starting on Monday of the Julian calendar. At the time, it was known as the Year of the Consulship of Olybrius and Probinus (or, less frequently, year 1148 Ab urbe condita). The denomination 395 for this year has been used since the early medieval period, when the Anno Domini calendar era became the prevalent method in Europe for naming years.

== Events ==
=== By place ===
==== Roman Empire ====
- January 17 – Emperor Theodosius I, age 48, dies of a disease involving severe edema in Milan. The Roman Empire is divided for the final time into an eastern and a western half. The Eastern Roman Empire is centered in Constantinople under Arcadius, son of Theodosius, and the Western Roman Empire in Mediolanum under his brother Honorius.
- April 27 – Arcadius marries Aelia Eudoxia, daughter of the Frankish general Flavius Bauto (without the knowledge or consent of Rufinus, Praetorian prefect of the East). His seven-year-old half-sister, Galla Placidia, is sent to Rome, where she spends her childhood in the household of Stilicho and his wife Serena.
- Revolt of Alaric I:
  - Alaric, Visigothic leader of the foederati, renounces Roman fealty and is declared king, waging war against both parts of the Roman Empire, and ending a 16-year period of peace.
  - Alaric besieges Constantinople. After commitments from Rufinus, the Pretorian prefect of the East, and chief adviser to Arcadius, the Goths move further west.
  - Stilicho arrives in the fall with his army to fight the Goths. Rufinus, the strong man of the east, persuades the emperor to cancel Stilicho's campaign. Emperor Arcadius forbade Stilicho to attack Alaric and demandes that his army leave the territory of the East Roman Empire.
  - The Goths, led by Alaric, invade and devastate Thrace and Macedonia and impose a tribute on Athens.
- November 27 – Rufinus, Praetorian prefect of the East, is murdered by Gothic mercenaries under Gainas.

==== Asia ====
- December 8 – Later Yan is defeated by its former vassal Northern Wei at the Battle of Canhe Slope, during the Southern and Northern Dynasties period of China.
- The Huns begin their large-scale attack on the Eastern Roman Empire. They invade Armenia, Cappadocia, and enter parts of Syria, threatening Antioch.

==== India ====
- King Rudrasimha III, ruler of the Western Satraps (India), is defeated by the Gupta Empire.

=== By topic ===
==== Agriculture ====
- An estimated 330,000 acres of farmland lie abandoned in Campania (southern Italy), partly as a consequence of malaria from mosquitoes bred in swampy areas, but mostly because imprudent agriculture has ruined the land.

==== Religion ====
- Augustine, age 40, becomes bishop of Hippo Regius (modern Algeria). His assignment is the reunification of the Roman Catholic Church in Africa, primarily focusing on the Donatist movement led by Primianus of Carthage.
- Russian astronomer Nikolai Alexandrovich Morozov claimed that Revelation to John could be astronomically dated to September 30, 395.

== Deaths ==
- January 17 – Theodosius I, Roman emperor (b. 347)
- November 27 – Rufinus, Roman consul and politician
- Apa Bane, Christian hermit and saint
- Ausonius, Roman poet and rhetorician
- Gelasius of Caesarea, Christian bishop
- Macarius of Alexandria, Christian monk
