= Pyotr Sakseyev =

Soviet military commander

Pyotr Ivanovich Sakseyev
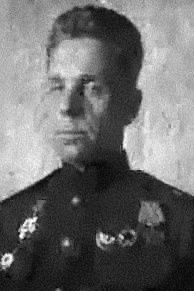
- Sakseyev during World War II
- Born: 14 December 1897; Velikoye, Yaroslavl Governorate, Russian Empire
- Died: 14 January 1944 (aged 46)
- Allegiance: Russian Empire; Soviet Union
- Branch: Imperial Russian Army; Red Army
- Service years: 1916–1918; 1918–1944
- Rank: General-mayor
- Commands: 76th Fortified Region (became 1st Guards Fortified Region); 24th Guards Rifle Division
- Conflicts: World War I; Russian Civil War; World War II
- Awards: Order of the Red Banner

Pyotr Ivanovich Sakseyev (Russian: Петр Иванович Саксеев; 14 December 1897 – 14 January 1944) was a Red Army general-mayor who held divisional command during World War II.

A veteran of World War I and the Russian Civil War, Sakseyev rose to hold logistics positions in the interwar Red Army and commanded the 76th Fortified Region in the Battle of Stalingrad. He was killed in January 1944 while commanding the 24th Guards Rifle Division.

== Early life, World War I and Russian Civil War ==
A Russian, Pyotr Ivanovich Sakseyev was born in a peasant family on 14 December 1897 in the village of Velikoye, Velikoselsky volost, Yaroslavsky Uyezd, Yaroslavl Governorate. He worked at a flax-spinning mill in the settlement of Romanovo-Borisoglebsk (now Tutayev). During World War I, Sakseyev was mobilized for military service on 25 May 1916 and sent to the 212th Reserve Regiment at Morshansk. In August he was sent to the Southwestern Front with a march company, where he fought as a ryadovoy in the 84th Shirvan Infantry Regiment of the 21st Infantry Division. He was demobilized in February 1918, and returned from the front to work at the flax-spinning mill in Tutayev.

During the Russian Civil War, Sakseyev was conscripted into the Red Army at Tutayev on 15 August 1918 and assigned to the local rifle battalion. In October he volunteered to transfer to the 1st Soviet Rifle Regiment at Yaroslavl. In November he went to the Northern Front near Arkhangelsk with a march company, being appointed a squad leader in the 14th Narva Communist Regiment. With this unit, he fought against the Whites in the northwest. In April 1919 the regiment was merged into the 156th Gatchina Rifle Regiment. In May he departed for Petrograd with the regiment, where they took part in the fighting against the Northwestern Army. In September Sakseyev caught typhus and spent almost a year in the hospital. On recovery he was assigned to the reserve regiment in Kineshma. Two weeks later he was sent to the Western Front, serving in the 46th Reserve Rifle Regiment, later renamed the Reserve Regiment of the 13th Army. With this unit, he fought in the suppression of the Makhnovites in Ukraine.

== Interwar period ==
In January 1921 Sakseyev was sent to the 83rd Slavyansk Infantry Course for command training. After completing the course in September 1922, he was posted to the 134th Rifle Regiment of the 45th Rifle Division of the Ukrainian Military District as a squad leader. In March 1923 he was transferred to the division's 133rd Rifle Regiment, where he served as a squad leader, platoon leader, and assistant company commander. In October 1925 he rose to command a company of the 136th Dnieper Rifle Regiment of the 46th Rifle Division. In 1928, he passed the correspondence examination for a normal military school offered by the Kiev Combined School for the Training of Commanders.

After completing the Vystrel course from November 1930 to July 1931, Sakseyev returned to the 46th Rifle Division as assistant chief of its 1st Staff Section. In January 1934 he was transferred to serve as assistant commander for material support of the division's 138th Rifle Regiment. In February 1937 then-Major Sakseyev was appointed to the same position in the 4th Territorial Anti-Aircraft Machine Gun Regiment of the 2nd Brigade of the Air Defense of the Kiev Military District. From March 1938 he served as chief of the 1st Section of the Provisioning Department of the Kiev Special Military District. From September he was chief of the district Military Supply Course. In 1941 he completed two years of correspondence courses for the Frunze Military Academy.

== World War II ==
After Germany invaded the Soviet Union, Sakseyev continued to lead the course on the Southwestern Front. From 9 July to 16 August he led the course in the Battle of Kiev, fighting in the battles on the Irpen river, and was wounded on 21 August. In December he was appointed deputy chief of the Simferopol Quartermaster School, and in February 1942 transferred to the same position at the Kuznetsk Machine Gun and Mortar School of the Volga Military District. Sakseyev took command of the 76th Fortified Region, formed at Kuznetsk, on 14 May, and from August led it in the Battle of Stalingrad, defending positions south of the city as part of the 51st Army. The fortified region took part in the Kotelnikovo Offensive and the Rostov Offensive during the Soviet counteroffensive at Stalingrad. For his performance in the Kotelnikovo Offensive, Sakseyev was awarded the Order of the Red Banner on 29 March, and the 76th Fortified Region became the elite 1st Guards Fortified Region on 4 May. The recommendation read:

A strong-willed, bold, and decisive commander. Units of the 76th Fortified Region, commanded by Comrade Sakseyev, showed exceptionally steadfastness and endurance in the struggle with the German occupiers. On 3 November 1942, in the region of Stalingrad, the sovkhoz of Privolzhsky, and Liman Shchuchy, the enemy threw up to 200 tanks and significant quantities of aircraft into the attack against the 76th Fortified Region, holding the defense. Only at the price of heavy losses did the enemy manage to break through into the depths of the defense on the right flank. After this, Comrade Sakseyev made a bold maneuver, taking the 156th Separate Motor Rifle Battalion and 4th Company of the 51st Separate Machine Gun Artillery Battalion from the left flank and personally leading the battle, rousing and inspiring soldiers and commanders to destroy the enemy, counterattacking the enemy and throwing him back to his original positions. During this battle, 59 tanks, eight armored vehicles, up to 100 vehicles, and 1,420 Hitlerites were wiped out.

In the subsequent battles the village of Konukovo and Kenkrya were successfully taken and quickly consolidating, they threw back repeated enemy attacks, which were forced back with the loss of 700 soldiers and officers killed.

On 24 December 1942 the enemy, with 25 tanks and two battalions of motorized infantry, attacked the first company at the village of Nutra and surrounded it. Comrade Sakseyev successfully established communications with the company and led it, which courageously fought until the approach of the main forces and the enemy was thrown back with heavy losses. During the period of the fighting the units of the fortified region never retreated, their lines an impregnable fortress. For skillful leadership of the fighting, for courage and bravery, Colonel Sakseyev is deserving of the state award of the Order of the Red Banner.

From May the fortified region was assigned to the 28th Army. During August and September the fortified region fought in the Donbass Strategic Offensive as part of the 44th Army. Its units took part in the liberation of Taganrog and Osipenko. For his performance in the liberation of Taganrog, Sakseyev received the Order of Kutuzov, 2nd class, awarded on 17 September. The recommendation read:

Guards Colonel Sakseyev has been in the position of commandant of the 1st Guards Fortified Region from May 1943, and with the army from August 1943. During this period he showed himself to be an able, tactically prepared, dynamic, and bold commander. By the beginning of the offensive the fortified region of Colonel Sakseyev defended a front of more than 40 kilometers, and with a skillful maneuver of fire and operations of separate detachments diverted the attention of the enemy, covering these advancing groupings. From 29 to 30 August 1943, operating with mobile detachments on the Taganrog axis, Guards Colonel Sakseyev skillfully led the mobile detachments and with a rapid strike put the enemy to confusion and flight from Taganrog, not managing to damage industry and the city. Pursuing the enemy, the mobile detachment of the heavy group on the Taganrog Peninsula destroyed more than 1,000 German soldiers and officers, capturing about 500 prisoners. Manauvering with mobile detachments, Guards Colonel Sakseyev with the methodical blows of his forces fully wiped out the remnants of a Cossack regiment - traitors to the Homeland, the Separate Caucasian Legion, a labor battalion, and a pontoon bridge battalion. For fine organized direction and achieving with fine cooperation a terrible defeat on the enemy, Guards Colonel Sakseyev is deserving of the award of the Order of Kutuzov, 2nd class.

On 23 September Sakseyev was promoted to command the 24th Guards Rifle Division. He was promoted to the rank of general-mayor on 24 September. As part of the 2nd Guards Army, the division took part in the Melitopol Offensive, breaking through the German defenses on the Molochnaya and fighting to clear the territory between the Dnieper estuary and the Black Sea coast. The division reached the Dnieper in the region of Golaya Pristan on the night of 3–4 November. Subsequently, during November and early December, the division defended the Black Sea coast in the region of Fordshtadt and the khutor of Pokrovskoye, taking part in the elimination of an Axis landing there. From 24 December, the division, as part of the 28th Army, took part in attacks against the German Nikopol landing on the left bank of the Dnieper in the region of Lepetikha. On 12 January, the division and its parent army went on the offensive against the Nikopol bridgehead, and the 24th Guards managed to take the first German trench line on the next day. During the fighting, Sakseyev was killed on 14 January 1944 during the repulse of a German counterattack. His division suffered heavy losses in the failed attacks and had to be withdrawn to the second line. Survived by his wife, Sakseyev was buried in Melitopol. For his performance, Sakseyev was posthumously recommended for the Order of the Patriotic War, 1st class, awarded on 17 January. The recommendation read:

Comrade P. I. Sakseyev, in the battles for the socialist Homeland, showed himself to be a courageous and valiant commander. In the battles for Stalingrad Comrade P. I. Sakseyev was awarded the Order of the Red Banner and for the capture of the hills on the Mius river and taking of the city of Taganrog the Order of Kutuzov, 2nd class.

Taking command of the 24th Guards Rifle Division at the Molochnaya river, Comrade P. I. Sakseyev finely prepared his unit for the forcing of the Molochnaya river, taking the village of Vaynau-Toudolyubimovka with few losses, in which a great defeat was inflicted on the enemy in personnel and equipment.

After the division reached the Kinburg Spit, the 24th Guards Rifle Division was assigned the mission of wiping out an enemy landing. Elements of the division under the command of Comrade Sakseyev fulfilled the mission, wiping out up to 700 enemy soldiers and officers, and capturing 493, including one lieutenant-colonel, one major, and thirteen officers. Several depots with ammunition and trophies were taken.

In the battles to eliminate the enemy strongpoint on the left bank of the Dnieper, Hill 1.4, in the region of the village of Solomka, Gornostayevka Raion of Nikolayev Oblast, the units of Comrade P. I. Sakseyev took the first trenches of the enemy defense. On 14 January 1944 the enemy launched a counterattack with tanks and infantry. The counterattack was beaten back, and five tanks, one Ferdinand and up to a battalion of enemy infantry destroyed. In this battle Comrade P. I. Sakseyev, observing the battle, died the death of the brave.

== Awards ==
Sakseyev was a recipient of the following decorations:

- Order of the Red Banner
- Order of Kutuzov, 2nd class
- Order of the Patriotic War, 1st class (posthumous)
