= Kashinsky District =

Kashinsky District Кашинский район (Russian)
- District
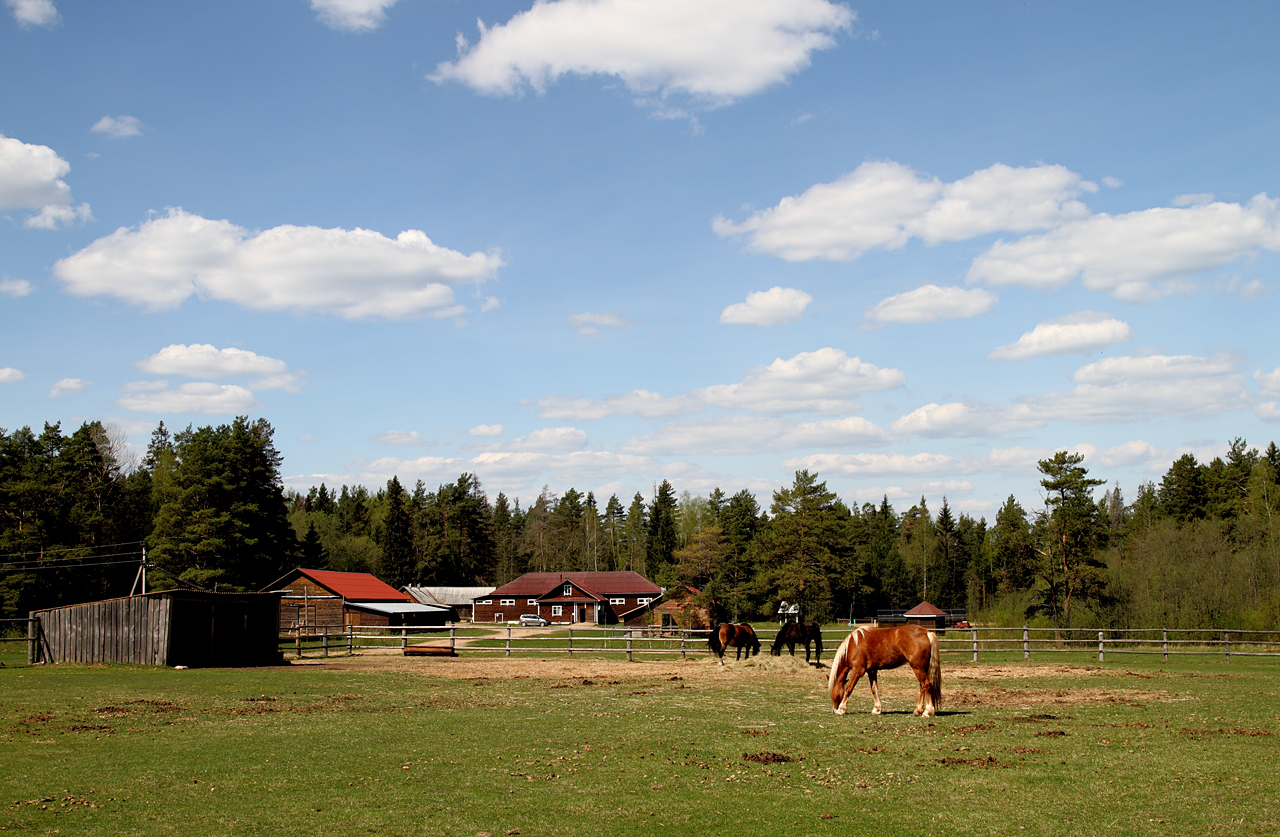
- Recreation camp in Kashinsky District

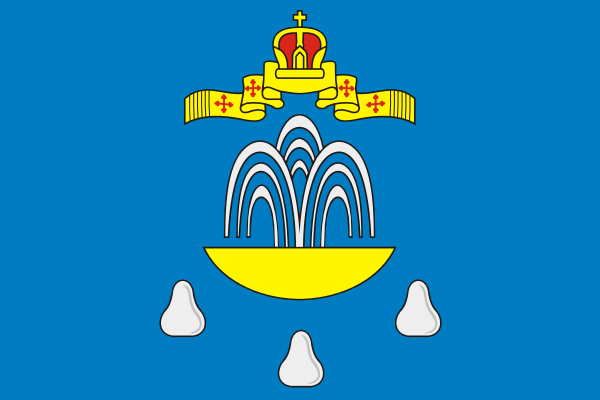
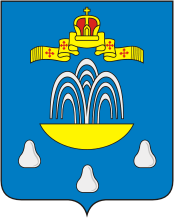
- Flag Coat of arms
- Location of Kashinsky District in Tver Oblast
- Coordinates: 57°21′N 37°37′E
- Country: Russia
- Federal subject: Tver Oblast
- Established: 12 July 1929
- Administrative center: Kashin

Area
  - Total: 2,010 km^{2} (780 sq mi)

Population (2010 Census)
  - Total: 27,410
  - Density: 13.6/km^{2} (35.3/sq mi)
  - Urban: 59.0%
  - Rural: 41.0%

Administrative structure
  - Administrative divisions: 1 Urban settlements, 11 Rural settlements
  - Inhabited localities: 1 cities/towns, 396 rural localities

Municipal structure
  - Municipally incorporated as: Kashinsky Municipal District
  - Municipal divisions: 1 urban settlements, 11 rural settlements
- Time zone: UTC+3 (MSK)
- OKTMO ID: 28624000
- Website: http://www.kashin.info/

Kashinsky District (Russian: Ка́шинский райо́н) is an administrative and municipal district (raion), one of the thirty-six in Tver Oblast, Russia. It is located in the east of the oblast and borders with Kesovogorsky District in the north, Uglichsky District of Yaroslavl Oblast in the east, Kalyazinsky District in the southeast, Kimrsky District in the south, Rameshkovsky District in the west, and with Bezhetsky District in the northwest. The area of the district is 2,010 square kilometers (780 sq mi). Its administrative center is the town of Kashin. Population: 27,410 (2010 Census); 12,701 (2002 census); 15,805 (1989 Soviet census). The population of Kashin accounts for 59.0% of the district's total population.

== Geography ==
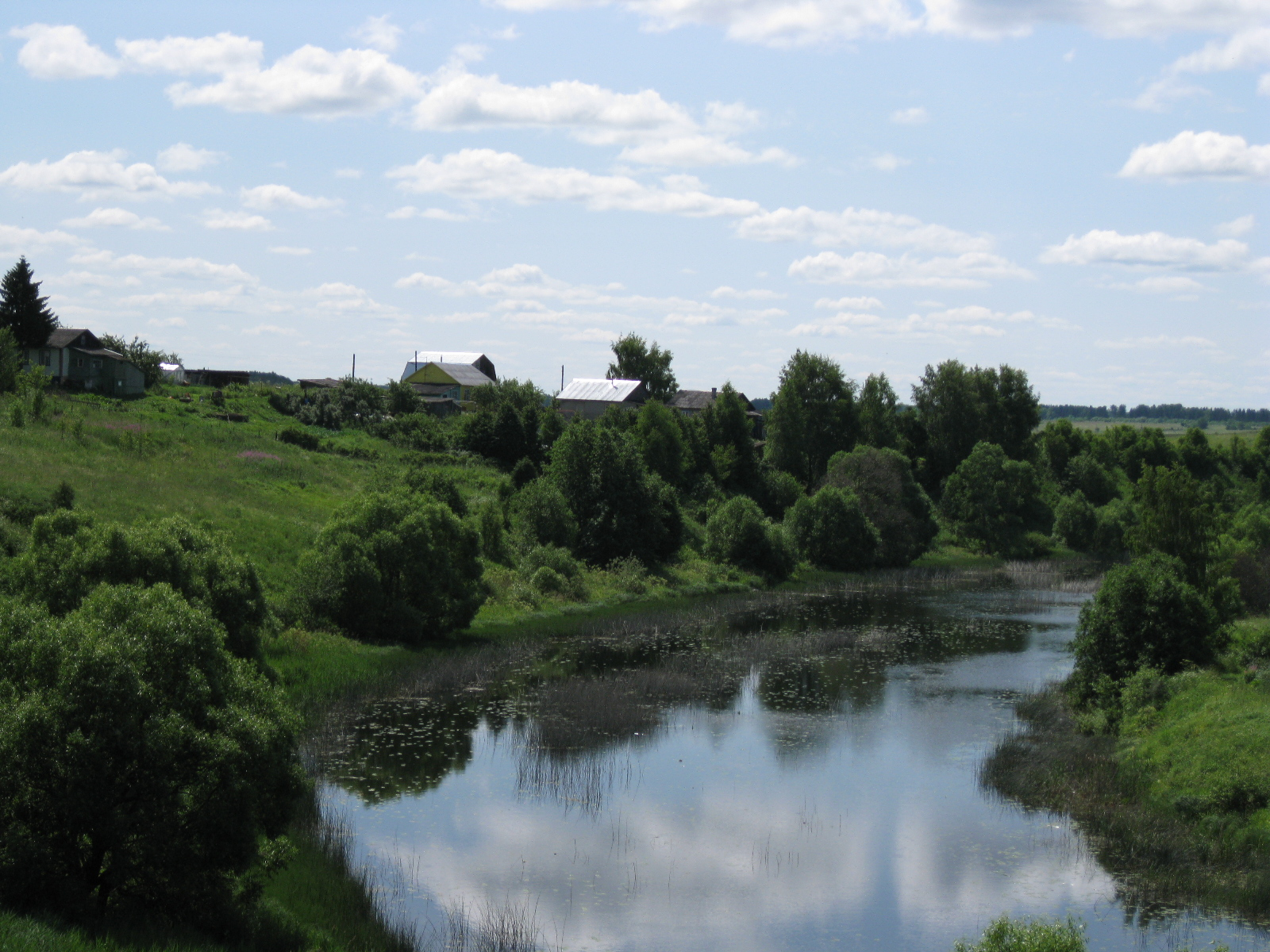
The Kashinka River in the village of Bezguzovo.

The whole area of the district belongs to the drainage basin of the Volga River. The Volga, built as the Uglich Reservoir, makes the southeastern border of the district. The largest tributaries of the Volga within the district are the Medveditsa River, which crosses the southern part of the district and also makes the stretch of the border with Kimrsky District, and the Kashinka River.

== History ==
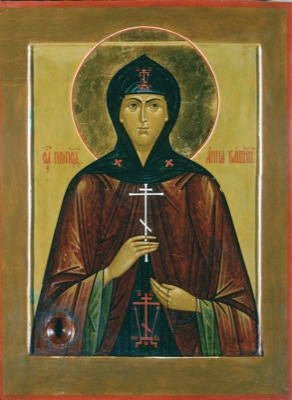
Saint Anna of Kashin, the icon of the late 19th century

It is unclear when Kashin was founded, with plausible dates in the 12th and the 13th centuries, and it is reliably mentioned in 1287, when it belonged to Principality of Tver. Since 1319, Kashin was the center of Principality of Kashin, which was first dependent on the Principality of Tver. In fact, Vasily, the first Prince of Kashin, was the son of Mikhail of Tver, and his mother and the wife of Michael, Anna of Kashin, lived in Kashin for the last years of her life. She was later canonized and is considered to be a saint protector of the town. Later, Kashin Principality was slowly drifting towards the Grand Duchy of Moscow. In 1375, it was accepted as an independent principality subordinate to Moscow, then between 1382 and 1399 it was a part of Principality of Tver, and in 1485 it was formally annexed by Moscow and abolished. In 1609 and 1612, during the Time of Troubles, Kashin was badly damaged by the Polish troops.

In the course of the administrative reform carried out in 1708 by Peter the Great, the area was included into Ingermanland Governorate (known since 1710 as Saint Petersburg Governorate), but in 1727 it was transferred to Moscow Governorate. In 1775, Tver Viceroyalty was formed from the lands which previously belonged to Moscow and Novgorod Governorates, and Kashinsky Uyezd was established. In 1796, Tver Viceroyalty was transformed into Tver Governorate. On October 3, 1927 Kashinsky Uyezd was abolished and split between Bezhetsky and Kimrsky Uyezds.

On July 12, 1929 the governorates and uyezds were abolished. Kashinsky District, with the administrative center in Kashin, was established within Bezhetsk Okrug of Moscow Oblast. On July 23, 1930, the okrugs were abolished, and the districts were directly subordinated to the oblast. On January 29, 1935 Kalinin Oblast was established, and Kashinsky District was transferred to Kalinin Oblast. On February 13, 1963, during the abortive Khrushchyov administrative reform, Kesovogorsky District was merged into Kashinsky District, but on November 3, 1965 it was re-established. In 1990, Kalinin Oblast was renamed Tver Oblast.

== Economy ==
The district specializes in agriculture. Other developed industries include logging, liquor and vodka production, mineral water bottling, and production of electrical equipment.

The main natural resources in the district are mineral water and peat.

=== Transportation ===
Buses connect the district with Tver and Moscow, as well as provide local transportation. There also roads from Kashin to Kalyazin and Kesova Gora. A railway connects Kashin with Sonkovo and Moscow; there is infrequent passenger traffic.

== Culture and recreation ==
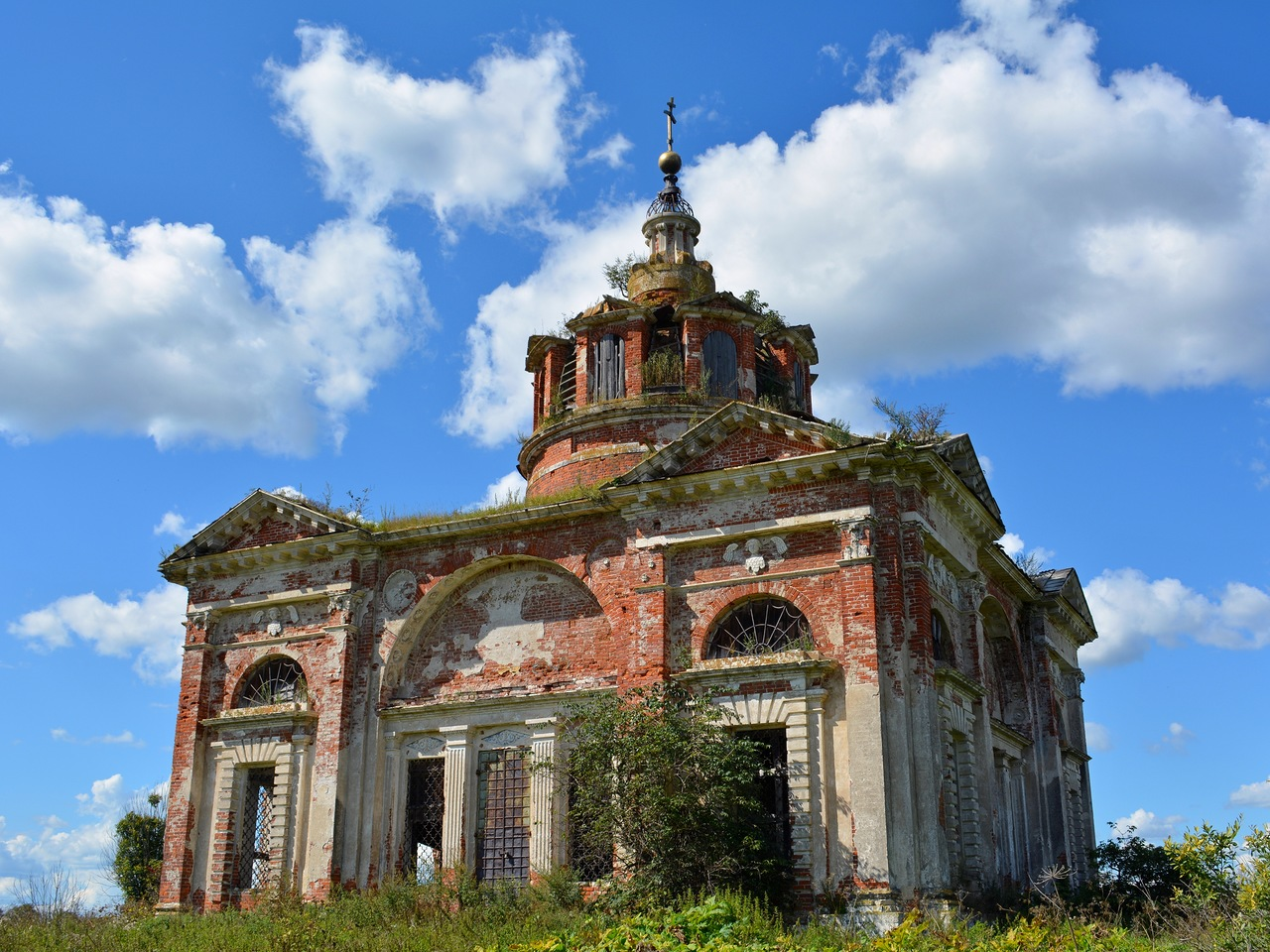
Church of the Nativity of the Theotokos, Saltykovo.

The district contains fifty-two cultural heritage monuments of federal significance (thirty-six of them located in Kashin) and additionally eighty-seven objects classified as cultural and historical heritage of local significance (fifty-six of them in Kashin). The federal monuments are the historical buildings in the center of Kashin, including the ensemble of the Presentation Monastery, a number of churches built in the 18th and the 19th centuries, the Shepeli Estate in the selo of Shepeli, as well as a number of archeological sites.

There is a local museum in Kashin, open in 1918. Mikhail Kalinin, a Soviet politician, was born in the selo of Verkhnyaya Troitsa. A memorial museum is open in the house which used to belong to his parents.

== Villages ==
- Miloslavskoye
