= Semyon Nakhimson =

Latvian politician (1885–1918)

Semyon Mikhailovich Nakhimson
- Семён Михайлович Нахимсон
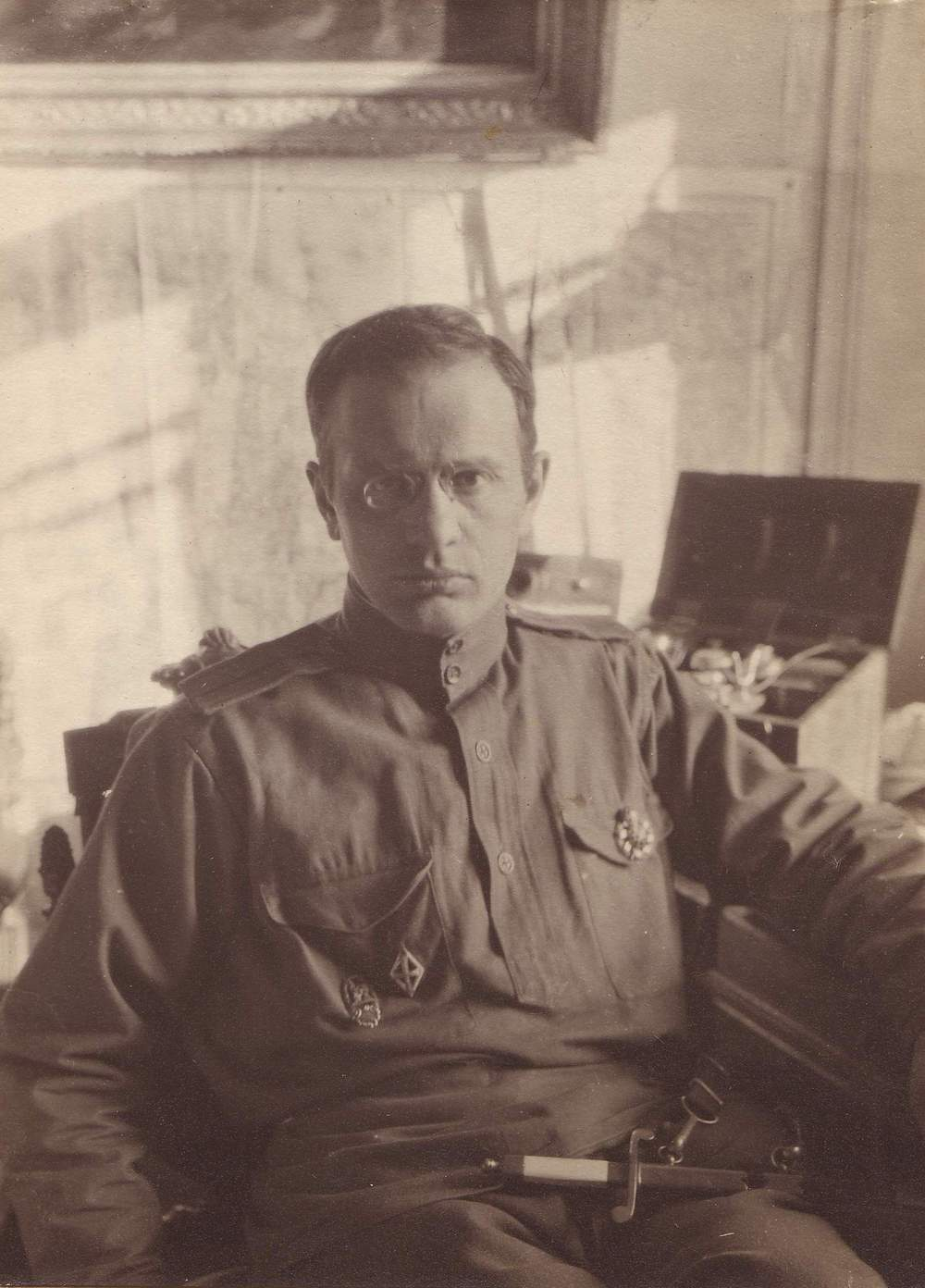
- Semyon Mikhailovich Nakhimson. December 1917

1st Commissioner of the Latvian Riflemen
- In office October 20, 1917 – April 13, 1918
- Succeeded by: Karl Peterson

Chairman of the Executive Committee of the Council of Soldiers' Deputies of the 12th Army of the Northern Front
- In office November 15, 1917 – May 1918
- Preceded by: Georgy Kuchin

Military Commissar of the Yaroslavl Military District
- In office May 30, 1918 – July 6, 1918
- Preceded by: Vasily Arkadyev
- Succeeded by: Vasily Arkadyev

Chairman of the Executive Committee of Yaroslavl Governorate Council of Workers' and Soldiers' Deputies
- In office July 4, 1918 – July 6, 1918
- Preceded by: Nikolay Dobrokhotov
- Succeeded by: Nikolay Pozharov

Personal details
- Born: November 25, 1885 Libava, Russian Empire (present-day Liepāja, Latvia)
- Died: July 6, 1918 (aged 32) Yaroslavl
- Party: Russian Social Democratic Labour Party; Russian Communist Party (Bolsheviks)
- Education: Libava School of Commerce; University of Bern; Psychoneurological Institute
- Alma mater: Semyon Nakhimson, with the badge of Latvian Riflemen, sample 1915. Valka, September 1917
- Occupation: Philosophy, economics, medicine

Military service
- Allegiance: Russian Empire; Russian Soviet Republic
- Years of service: 1915–1918
- Rank: Ordinary military doctor

Semyon Mikhailovich Nakhimson (pseudonyms: Mikhalchi, Pavel Salin; 25 November 1885 — 6 July 1918) was a member of the revolutionary movement in Russia and military commissar of the Yaroslavl District.

== Biography ==
Born November 25, 1885 in Libau in a large Jewish merchant family. Semyon's three brothers received higher education abroad and returned to the Russian Empire: the elder brother Gregory is a mining engineer; younger brothers: Fedor (1887–1939) – lawyer, future deputy chairman of the Criminal and Judicial Panel of the Supreme Court and Veniamin (1891–1942) – electrical engineer.

Received secondary education in Libau and Saint Petersburg gymnasiums.

In 1902, as a student of the Libava Commercial School, he joined the Bund, and from 1904 he was a member of the Social Democratic Organization of Latvia. From January 1905, one of the leaders of the Libava Labor Center, a military revolutionary organization uniting representatives of the Latvian Social-Democratic Labor Party, a local group of the Russian Social Democratic Labour Party and Bund. He took an active part in organizing combat squads, issuing revolutionary proclamations, led propaganda among workers and soldiers. In May 1905 he was elected chairman of the Military Council. He was subject to arrest for preparing the uprising of the Libava garrison, but managed to escape abroad. In 1906 he returned to Russia; member of the Kovno military organization of the Russian Social-Democratic Labor Party and the Bund.

In 1907, the delegate of the 5th (London) Congress of the Russian Social Democratic Labour Party. Conducted underground work in Brest-Litovsk.

Since the end of 1907 in exile. He graduated from the Faculty of Philosophy of the University of Bern with the title of "Doctor of Philosophy and Economics", additionally listened to a course of lectures at the Faculty of Medicine. In 1909, as a student, he joined the Bern Assistance Group for Bund, whence he was soon expelled for slap in the face of the group to Lensky.

In 1912 he returned to Russia and continued working in the organizations of Bund and the Russian Social Democratic Labour Party. First he was a Menshevik, then he became a Bolshevik (between 1912 and 1918). He worked in Saint Petersburg, Moscow and other cities, collaborated in the "Zvezda" and "Pravda". Enrolled as a volunteer at the Psychoneurological Institute.

In January 1913, he was arrested in Moscow during the dispersal of an illegal Congress of commercial and industrial employees, which took place on the Sparrow Hills. After his release, he was exiled to Libava for a period of 2 years, followed by a ban on residing in 58 settlements of the country.

On September 25, 1913, together with his brother Fedor, he was arrested in Libava, was detained for about a month. After his release, he received a ban on leaving Libava and was obliged to report to the police every day. In the summer of 1914, with the beginning of the war, he left Libau without the permission of the police (it was believed that "Libau will be taken soon"). Until September 1914 he was in Saint Petersburg, then in Kremenchug.

From 1915 in the army, he was head of the medical part of an ambulance car, junior doctor of the sanitary unit of the All-Russian Union of Cities, operating on the Southwestern Front. He received a special military rank "Ordinary military physician" (approximately the corresponding rank "ensign").

In February 1917, he was arrested in Nesvizh together with several Jewish soldiers on a false espionage charge. Released in the days of the February Revolution. In March 1917, as a delegate of the Southwestern Front, he was sent to Petrograd. On April 14, 1917 he was elected to the Petrograd Committee of the Russian Social-Democratic Labor Party (Bolsheviks). Delegate of the 6th Congress of the Russian Social Democratic Labour Party (Bolsheviks). Chairman of the 1st City District Committee of the Russian Social-Democratic Labor Party (Bolsheviks) in Petrograd, member of the military section of the Petrograd Soviet. On May 27, 1917 he was elected a member of the Central Executive Committee of the Council of Workers' and Soldiers' Deputies of Petrograd.

In August 1917, he was sent to the Army in the Army (Northern Front): traveling agitator; editor of the Bolshevik military newspaper "Okopnaya Pravda" (later "Okopny Alarm"). Thanks largely to his efforts, the 12th Army turned into an uncontrollable mob of deserters, accused of betraying and surrendering Riga to the Germans in August 1917. In September 1917, the Bolsheviks won nine seats in the re-election of the executive committee of the soldier section. Among the elected were himself Simon Mikhailovich, Alexander Kopyatkevich, Konstantin Mekhonoshin and other prominent Bolsheviks of the time. On October 18, 1917 joined the Military Revolutionary Committee of the 12th Army of the Northern Front. On October 20, 1917, he was elected Commissioner of the Latvian Rifle Regiments. On November 14, he was elected Chairman of the Executive Committee of the Council of Soldiers' Deputies and Commissioner of the 12th Army. On December 18, 1917, he was appointed Political Commissar of the Latvian Corps by order of the Commander-in-Chief of the curtain.

Delegate of the First and Second All-Russian Congresses of the Soviets, at the II Congress he was elected a member of the All-Russian Central Executive Committee. Member of the meeting of the Constituent Assembly on January 18, 1918.

In December 1917, the Petrograd newspaper The Day published an article by another famous journalist Lev Lvov about Semyon Nakhimson depicting the unseemly image of a pseudo-revolutionary who allegedly was involved in violations of financial discipline and spreading false information about his biography. The army commission of inquiry from representatives of various party factions, appointed at the categorical demand of Semyon Nakhimson himself, thoroughly investigated all the charges, dismantled all the political activities of the revolutionary and thoroughly admitted that the charges were defamatory. On March 12, 1918 fully rehabilitated by the general meeting of the Executive Committee of the Council of Soldiers' Deputies of the 12th Army, demanding the immediate publication of the decisions of the investigative commission.

In January–February 1918, together with former General Fedor Novitsky, he led the formation of the first Red Army units in the Republic.

On March 22, 1918, on suspicion of withholding 10 thousand rubles during the February retreat, was subjected to house arrest in the city of Rybinsk with suspension from all responsible posts. On April 8, 1918, the Investigation Commission of the Rybinsk Revolutionary Tribunal decided: "The matter should be stopped and completely rehabilitated the pure revolutionary honor of comrade Semyon Nakhimson from any malicious slanderous attacks".

On May 21, 1918, summoned to Moscow by order of the Council of Labor and Defense. On May 30, 1918, he was appointed military commissar (through the Central Committee of the Russian Communist Party (Bolsheviks)) of the largest in Soviet Russia Yaroslavl Military District. He launched an active mobilization work, achieved the formation and sending to the Czechoslovak front of a number of "extraordinary" divisions.

On July 4, 1918, chairman of the Yaroslavl Regional Executive Committee. He was killed by a rebel (according to one of the versions he was hacked to pieces at the Bristol Hotel) at the very beginning of the Yaroslavl Uprising on July 6, 1918. He was buried at the Monument to the Fighters of the Revolution on the Field of Mars in Petrograd.

From 1918 to 1944, Vladimirsky Avenue and the square in Leningrad were named after Nakhimson. In the project, the Vladimirskaya metro station was called "Nakhimson Square". There are streets of Nakhimson in the cities of Ivanovo, Smolensk, Staraya Russa, Pavlovsk and Petrodvorets (Saint Petersburg), Nevel (Pskov Region), Okulovka (Novgorod Region) and several other cities and towns. One of the streams flowing in Peterhof Park of Peterhof, is called the Nakhimson groove. Since August 1984, the street in Yaroslavl also bears the name of Nakhimson. Until 1993, the street in Rybinsk was named after Nakhimson (now Malaya Kazanskaya).

== Interesting facts ==
- The shoulder straps of the ordinary doctor (special title at the level of "ensign" rank), established in 1894, were almost no different from the captain's shoulder straps. Thanks to this purely external circumstance, the mobilized medical student gained significant weight in the military environment (the most vivid example is the career of the Deputy Chairman of the Revolutionary Military Council Efraim Sklyansky).
- One of Semen Nakhimson's brothers, Veniamin Mikhailovich Nakhimson, served as chief engineer at the 3rd State Power Station in Petrograd. In October 1917, on the night of the October Revolution, Veniamin Nakhimson, at the personal request of Vladimir Lenin, cut off electricity, leaving the main bridges in a diluted state. While on the distant approaches to the capital, Latvian riflemen, controlled by Semyon Nakhimson, blocked the sending of government troops to Petrograd, his brother Veniamin Nakhimson protected the center of the city, captured by the Bolsheviks, from possible "pacification".
- On March 20, 1918, at the meeting of the Revolutionary Tribunal's court in the Rybinsk Stock Exchange building, the Deputy Chairman of the Executive Committee of the Council of Soldiers' Deputies of the 12th Army Shimeliovich, speaking as a defender in the case of Polyansky and Dobrotvorsky, fired three pistol shots at Semen Nakhimson, who acted as an accuser, but not hit.

== Sources ==
- Nakhimson Semyon Mikhailovich. Private case. 1917–1918 (Russian State Archive of Social and Political History. Fund 17. Inventory 35. Case 912).
- Nikolai Kondratyev. Burn, my heart... Riga, 1961
- Biographies on the site "Chronos"
- Vladimir Ryaby. Semyon Nakhimson. From the Second Category. Proza.ru
- Nakhimson Semen Mikhailovich. funeral-spb.ru

== Character ==
- Herbert Kemoklidze. Salin: a novel. Yaroslavl, 2009
