= Kashinka =

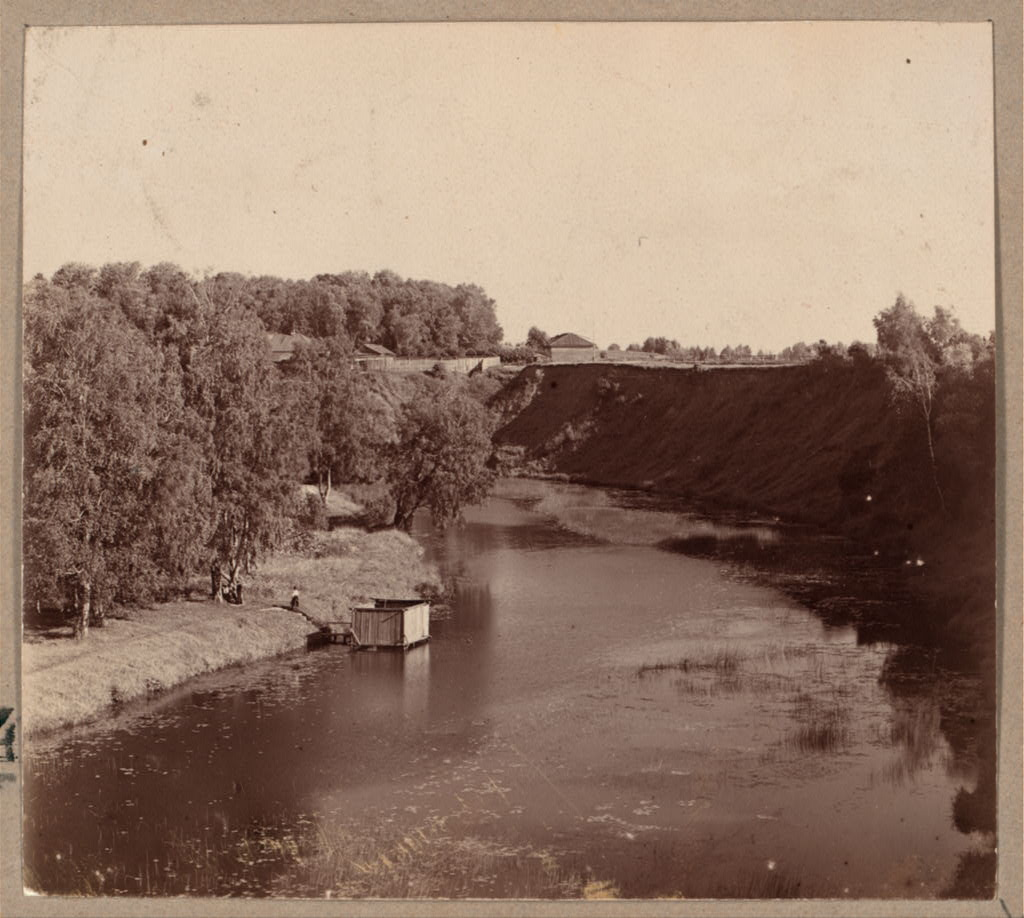
- Kashinka River in Kashin

Location
- Country: Russia

Physical characteristics
- Source
  - location: Near Kesova Gora
- Mouth: Volga
  - coordinates: 57°16′10″N 37°43′21″E
- Length: 128 km (80 mi)
- Basin size: 661 km^{2} (255 sq mi)
- Discharge
  - average: 4.5 m^{3}/s (160 cu ft/s)

Basin features
- Progression: Volga→ Caspian Sea

The Kashinka (Russian: Ка́шинка, IPA: [ˈkaʂɨnkə]) is a river in Kesovogorsky and Kashinsky Districts of Tver Oblast, Russia, a left tributary of the Volga (joining the Volga at the Uglich Reservoir, near the town of Kalyazin). The length of the river is 128 kilometres (80 mi), and the area of its drainage basin is 661 square kilometres (255 mi^{2}). The town of Kashin and the urban-type settlement of Kesova Gora are located along the Kashinka.

The source of the Kashinka is in the swamps northwest of the village of Zadorye, at the border of Kesovogorsky and Bezhetsky districts. It flows east, passes Kesova Gora, and in the village of Brylino turns south. It makes a loop as it passes Kashin. The historical part of the town is located within the loop of the Kashinka. Further south, it becomes a part of the Uglich Reservoir. It joins the Volga in the village of Gorki.

The drainage basin of the Kashinka includes the central part of Kashinsky District and the southern part of Kesovogorsky District, as well as minor areas in the east of Bezhetsky District.

The Kashinka is one of the most popular swimming and fishing locations in Kashin during the summer. It mostly flows through rural areas.
