= Andronik Nikolsky =

Bishop in the Russian Orthodox Church

Andronik (Nikolsky)
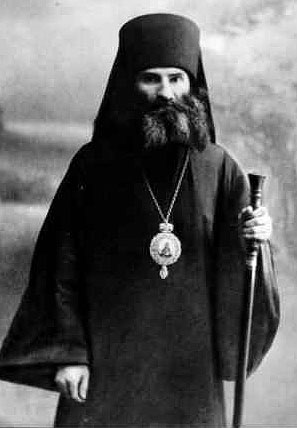
- Born: August 1, 1870
- Died: July 7, 1918 (aged 47)
- Occupation: Clergyman

Archbishop Andronik (also spelled Andronic; Russian: Архиепи́скоп Андрони́к, secular name Vladimir Alexandrovich Nikolsky, Russian: Влади́мир Алекса́ндрович Нико́льский; August 1, 1870 – July 7, 1918), was a bishop in the Russian Orthodox Church and a saint, glorified as Hieromartyr Andronik, Archbishop Of Perm in 2000.

== Early life ==
Archbishop Andronik was born as Vladimir Nikolsky, on August 1, 1870, in Povodnevo, a village in Myshkinsky Uyezd, Yaroslavl diocese; his father was a deacon in the Russian Orthodox Church. After he finished his studies at the Yaroslavl Seminary in 1891, he entered the Moscow Theological Academy. On August 1, 1893, during his studies in Moscow, he was tonsured a monk and given the religious name of Andronik. He was ordained to the diaconate on August 6 of that same year. On July 22, 1895, he was ordained as a priest.

== Russian Orthodox Church ==
From 1895, Andronik was assigned first to the theological seminary of Kutaisi in Georgia and then at the seminary at Ardon as inspector and instructor.

=== Bishop of Kyoto ===
In 1897, Andronik was assigned as a member of the Russian Orthodox mission to the Empire of Japan, under Bishop Nikolai (Kasatkin), later glorified as St. Nicholas of Japan, to assist him in his missionary work, which he began 1861. Hieromonk Andronik was very surprised by this assignment and felt inadequate for the position, but ultimately he accepted it as God's will. His journey began in St. Petersburg, on September 21, 1897, and continued from Odessa with Archimandrite Sergius (Stragorodsky) on October 26. Traveling through European countries and the United States, they arrived in Japan on December 26. He wrote and published a book about this journey, A Missionary Journey to Japan (published in Kazan, Russia in 1899).

On November 5, 1906, Andronik was consecrated as the first Bishop of Kyoto. This became the seat of the West Japan Diocese of the Japanese Orthodox Church. Although Bishop Andronik was the bishop of Kyoto, he lived in Osaka which, while it then was the second largest city in Japan, was also where most of Orthodox faithful lived. After he arrived in Osaka, he began to feel ill and found performing his duties difficult. After serving in Osaka for three months, he asked leave to resign and to depart from Japan. On May 27, 1907, he left Japan and returned to Russia.

When he arrived in Russia, he was assigned on October 26 to be the deputy to Bishop Eulogius of Kholm; two years later he was assigned bishop of Tikhvin in Novgorod diocese.

=== Bishop of Perm and Solokamsk ===
On July 30, 1914, Andronik was appointed bishop of Perm and Solikamsk. This was eleven days after World War I began. As the war progressed, he worked energetically for one and a half million inhabitants and 570 churches in this region.

During the first year of the war, Andronicus took particular interest in the work of the monasteries and visited Belogorsky monastery, Shamarsky monastery and the Tabor hermitage.

In summer 1916, Andronik traveled to the Imperial Russian Army headquarters outside St. Petersburg where Tsar Nicholas II was leading the army. The purpose of this trip was to warn the Tsar about Rasputin; however, the Tsar would not take him seriously and his trip failed. But Nicholas II was pleased with the gift Bishop Andronik gave him on behalf of the people, a pair of soldier's boots that the province of Perm provided the army.

== Bolshevik Revolution ==
In 1917, Andronik became Bishop of Perm and Kungur, and became one of the seven hierarchs in the pre-conciliar synod preparing for the Local Council of the Russian Church in Moscow. He was very active throughout the council, from August 1917 until April 1918, which was the end of the second session of the Council. As the agitation of the Bolshevik take-over intensified on January 25, 1918, Bishop Adronik made a written appeal to the faithful to defend the heritage of the Church from the aggressors and looters as attacks became more frequent.

Andronik was a firm supporter of the Tsar. From his point of view, it was God's will that the anointed Tsar should reign over the empire; hence, the monarchy was an appropriate governmental system for Christians. But this did not mean he supported tyranny: the Tsar should listen to his people, and the monarch and the people should come to peace.

In February, in the Perm region, the Bolsheviks began to loot churches and monasteries. When the second session of the Council ended, Andronic returned to Perm. Patriarch Tikhon had elevated him to archbishop on April 25, Palm Sunday. On Holy Thursday, April 16, the Bolsheviks carried out a search of his residence. He remained calm and continued the services of Holy Week and Pascha (Easter).

The Bolshevik authorities increased pressure on the church in the following weeks. Finally Archbishop Andronik was arrested at midnight on July 4 (Gregorian calendar: July 17). In response, the clergy in Perm went on strike from the night he was arrested until July 13 (Gregorian: July 26), halting all divine services in the region except baptism and the last rites for the dying. There are various accounts of his death. The apparently most consistent says that on July 7, 1918, he was taken to the forest and forced to dig his own grave. After lying down in it, he was covered with earth and shots were fired into the dirt. When the Synod sent men to investigate his death, the Bolsheviks stopped the train carrying the investigators and killed all of them.

In 2000, the Russian Orthodox Church glorified him as Hieromartyr Andronik, Archbishop Of Perm, one of the Russian New Martyrs and Confessors. His feast day is July 7 on the Julian Calendar (Gregorian Calendar: July 20).
