= Nikolai Morozov (revolutionary) =

Russian revolutionary, scientist, writer (1854–1946)

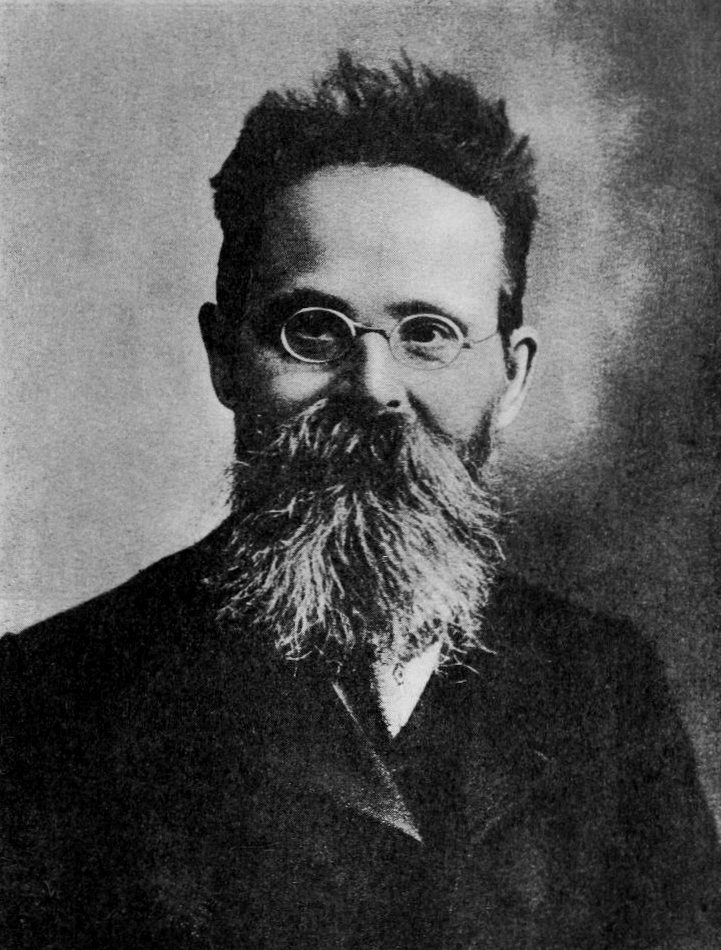
- Morozov c. 1880s
- Born: Nikolai Aleksandrovich Morozov; 7 July 1854; Borok, Mologsky Uyezd, Yaroslavl Governorate, Russian Empire
- Died: 30 July 1946 (aged 92); Borok, Nekouzsky District, Yaroslavl Oblast, RSFSR, Soviet Union
- Scientific career
- Fields: Natural science; chemistry; physics; astronomy; aviation

Nikolai Aleksandrovich Morozov (Russian: Никола́й Алекса́ндрович Моро́зов; 7 July 1854, Borok – 30 July 1946) was a Russian revolutionary who spent about 25 years in prison for revolutionary activities against the Tsarist government. He was also an academic, publishing works in various fields of science, and a pioneer of aviation in Russia. His pseudoscientific writings anticipated the ideas of the New Chronology.

== Early life and revolutionary activities ==
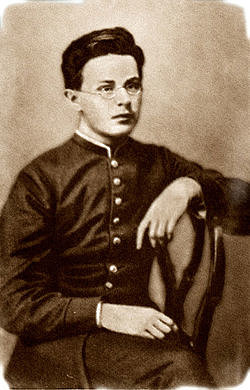
Morozov as a student

The son of a wealthy landowner and a serf woman who was bonded to his estate, Morozov was born in the village of Borok in the Governorate of Yaroslavl. He was initially educated at home before entering the second grade of the Second Moscow Gymnasium in 1869. At the gymnasium, he founded an informal self-education circle in the field of natural sciences, and from 1871 also attended lectures at Moscow University putting on a plaid and a leather forage cap, as was the custom among students at that time. Without finishing the fifth grade of a seven-year gymnasium, and not yet having managed to “discover new horizons in science,” Nikolai Morozov became a professional revolutionary, active in Russia and abroad. Showing an early interest in politics, he was on a police watchlist as a student. He joined the Circle of Tchaikovsky and was active in distributing propaganda among peasants in the Moscow, Voronezh, and Kursk governorates before police persecution forced him to return to Moscow. He moved to Saint Petersburg before departing for Geneva in 1874.

In 1875, he returned to Russia and was arrested at the border but released after his father paid his bail. He again devoted himself to revolutionary activities, distributing propaganda among the peasants of Saratov governorate.

In 1878, having returned to Saint Petersburg, Morozov was a member of Land and Liberty group where he co-edited their mouthpiece, Land and Liberty, (with Sergey Stepnyak-Kravchinsky). When the group faced an internal crisis over tactics, it split into two groups in August 1879. Morozov rejected the continued use of propaganda to bring about social change and, instead, advocated for use of direct action. He joined the more radical of the two factions, Narodnaya Volya (People's Will), eventually becoming one of its leaders.

In 1880, Olga Lyubatovich and Morozov left Narodnaya Volya and went to live in Geneva and London, where he was introduced to Karl Marx. While in exile, Morozov wrote The Terrorist Struggle, a pamphlet that explained his views on how to achieve a democratic society in Russia. He advocated for large numbers of small, independent terrorist groups and argued that this approach would make it difficult for the Tsarist secret police to apprehend the terrorists. This would also help to prevent a small group of leaders gaining power, forming oligarchical dictatorships after the overthrow of the Tsar.

Morozov returned to Russia in order to distribute The Terrorist Struggle on January 28, 1881, but was arrested at the border. He was imprisoned in Suwałki. Lyubatovich, having only just gone through childbirth, decided to attempt to rescue Morozov. However, her plan did not go well, and she was arrested and sent to Siberia in November 1882.

== Later career and ideas ==
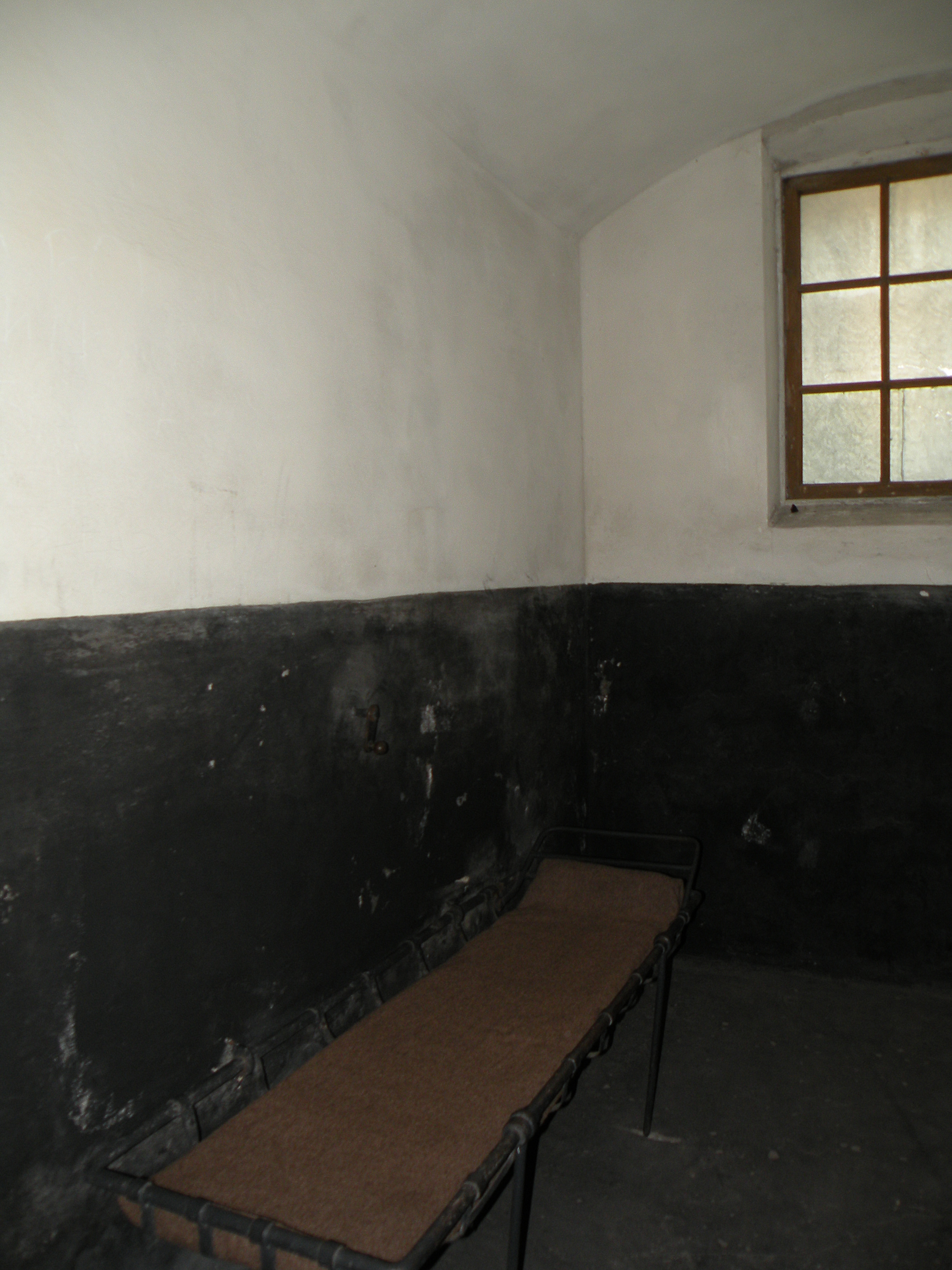
Morozov's cell at the Shlisselburg Fortress

Between 1882 and 1905, Morozov was imprisoned in Peter and Paul Fortress (in Saint Petersburg) and in Shlisselburg Fortress for his political activities. During this period, he wrote political verse and began intense studies in the fields of physics, chemistry, astronomy, and history. After receiving permission to use theological literature, he learned Hebrew and began an in-depth study of Biblical history. He participated in the October 1907 Russian legislative election and won election as a member of the Duma, but the authorities re-ran the election in the Mologsky District, thus preventing the former prisoner from taking his seat. He became a member of many scientific associations, including the Russian Aero-club. For the publication of his book Songs of the Stars in 1910, he was imprisoned for another year (1912 to 1913).

Many of his ideas were considered unorthodox and daring. He conjectured that atoms have a complicated level structure and may be transformed. In his treatise on the periodic table, Morozov predicted the discovery of inert elements.

Morozov became a pioneer of aeronautics in Russia in the 1910s. He flew airplanes and balloons, including over the Shlisselburg Fortress where he had been imprisoned, and lectured at an aviation school. He proposed a parachute system which would open automatically, and special suits for high-altitude flights. During World War I, Morozov went to the front in 1915 as a delegate of the All-Russian Zemstvo Union to aid the sick and wounded.

After the October Revolution of November 1917, Morozov took little interest in politics; he never joined the Communist Party. However, Anatoly Lunacharsky (Commissar for Education from 1917 to 1929) appointed him in 1918 to run the P. S. Lesgaft Institute of Natural Sciences) in Petrograd (Leningrad), a position which Morozov kept until his death at the age of 92.

Morozov was the author of a number of pseudohistorical works. In 1907, he published The Revelation in Storm and Thunder in which he produced evidence for his hypotheses:

- The Revelation to John can be dated astronomically to 30 September 395.
- The author of the Revelation is identical with John Chrysostom (c. 347 – 407).

The book drew strong criticism from philosophers, historians, and astronomers. Then the books "Prophets" (1914) and the seven volumes of "Khristos" (1924–1932) were published. He was self-taught astronomer and, based on the astronomical records such as the Almagest, he speculated that much of human history has been falsified. His theory that the existing chronology of historical events is incorrect, and requires revision, attracted the attention of Anatoly Fomenko (1945- ), who built his own New Chronology upon it.

In his declining years, Morozov established a laboratory in his native Borok, north of Uglich, to monitor and study "inland waters". In 1932 he was named an Honorary Member of the Soviet Academy of Sciences. He was awarded the Order of the Red Banner of Labor (1939) and two Orders of Lenin (1944, 1945).

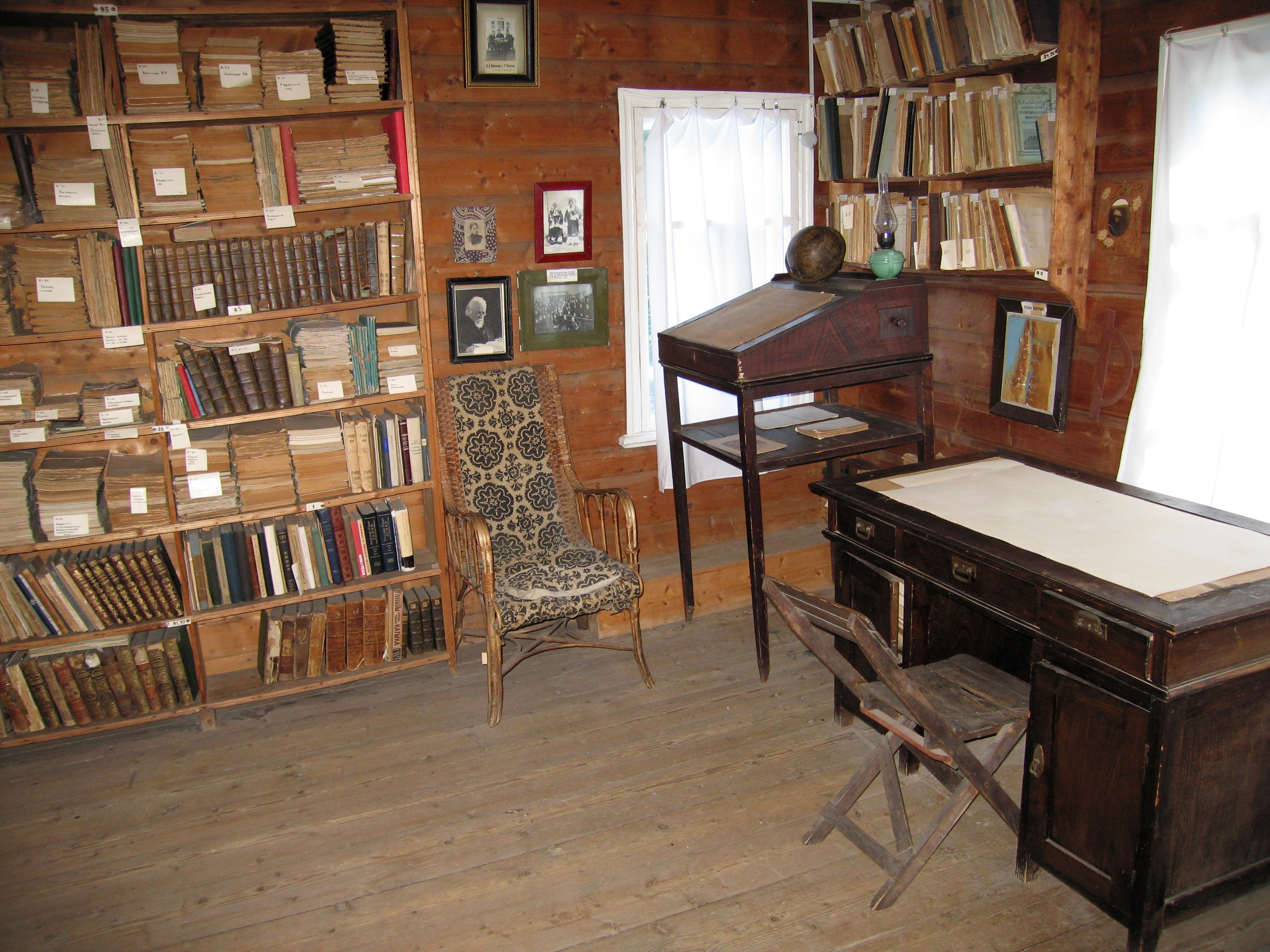
Morozov estate, Borok

There is a popular myth in Russia that in 1942, at age 88, he briefly served in the Red Army as a sniper during World War II, becoming the oldest known combatant of the war.

Morozov died on 30 July 1946 at the age of 92.

His memorial house in Borok, close to his grave site, is open to the public. The asteroid 1210 Morosovia is named in his honor.
