= Korozhechna =

- Native name: Корожечна (Russian)

Location
- Country: Russia

Physical characteristics
- Mouth: Volga
  - coordinates: 57°33′42″N 38°17′33″E
- Length: 147 km (91 mi)
- Basin size: 1,690 km^{2} (650 sq mi)

Basin features
- Progression: Volga→ Caspian Sea

The Korozhechna (Russian: Корожечна) is a river in Sonkovsky Kesovogorsky, and Kashinsky Districts of Tver Oblast and in Myshkinsky and Uglichsky District of Yaroslavl Oblast in Russia. It is a left tributary of the Volga. It is 147 kilometres (91 mi) long, and the area of its basin 1,690 square kilometres (650 sq mi).

The source of the Korozhechna is in the northwestern part of Kesovogorsky District, close to the village of Puzyryovo. The river flows northeast and enters Sonkovsky District. In the selo of Pereterye it turns southeast and returns to Kesovogorsky District. A short stretch of the Korozhechna makes a border between Kesovogorsky District of Tver Oblast and Myshkinsky District of Yaroslavl Oblast. South of this stretch, the Korozhechna departs from the border back to Tver Oblast, enters Kashinsky District and turns east. The river enters Yaroslavl Oblast and flows straight to the Volga. It flows through the western suburbs of the town of Uglich and turns north. The mouth of the Korozhechna is slightly downstream of Uglich. Technically, the Rybinsk Reservoir starts downstream of Uglich, and the Korozhechna is a tributary of the Rybinsk Reservoir.

The drainage basin of the Korozhechna includes the southern part of Sonkovsky District, the western part of Myshkinsky District, the northwestern part of Uglichsky District, as well as minor areas of Kesovogorsky, Kashinsky, and Nekouzsky Districts.
