= Puzyrevo =

Puzyrevo (Russian: Пузырево), or Puzyryovo (Пузырёво), is the name of several rural localities in Russia.

== Modern localities ==
- Puzyrevo, Arkhangelsk Oblast, a village in Pavlovsky Selsoviet of Vilegodsky District in Arkhangelsk Oblast
- Puzyrevo, Novgorod Oblast, a village in Turbinnoye Settlement of Okulovsky District in Novgorod Oblast
- Puzyrevo, Pytalovsky District, Pskov Oblast, a village in Pytalovsky District of Pskov Oblast
- Puzyrevo, Sebezhsky District, Pskov Oblast, a village in Sebezhsky District of Pskov Oblast
- Puzyrevo, Smolensk Oblast, a village in Dobroselskoye Rural Settlement of Monastyrshchinsky District in Smolensk Oblast
- Puzyrevo, Tver Oblast, a village in Liskovskoye Rural Settlement of Kesovogorsky District in Tver Oblast

== Abolished localities ==
- Puzyrevo, Kostroma Oblast, a village in Potrusovsky Selsoviet of Parfenyevsky District in Kostroma Oblast; abolished on October 18, 2004
