= Klavdiya Gadyuchkina =

Russian supercentenarian (1910–2025)

- Клавдия Гадючкина
- Born: Klavdiya Mikhailovna Krotova; 5 December 1910; Norskoye, Yaroslavl Governorate, Russian Empire
- Died: 29 November 2025 (aged 114 years, 359 days); Yaroslavl, Russia
- Known for: Oldest recorded Russian person; Surviving subject of Nicholas II
- Spouse: Sergey Petrovich Gadyuchkin (died 1956)
- Children: 5

Klavdiya Mikhailovna Gadyuchkina (Russian: Клавдия Михайловна Гадючкина; née Krotova; 5 December 1910 – 29 November 2025) was a Russian supercentenarian. She was the oldest living person in Russia at the time of her death, and the oldest Russian ever recorded.

== Biography ==
Gadyuchkina was born on 5 December 1910 (Note: Gadyuchkina claimed to be born on 24 November 1909, but was verified as being born 5 December 1910.) in Norskoye in the Yaroslavl Governorate of the Russian Empire (now part of the city of Yaroslavl in the Russian Federation) to Mikhail Krotov, a carpenter, and Yevlampiya Krotova. When she was a child, (Note: In one article, her mother was reported to have died when Klavdiya was 9 and in another when she was 5.) her mother died of cancer.

At the age of 15, she started a job at the Red Pass (Russian: Красный Перевал) spinning factory, where she continued to work for over 40 years. She worked first as a labourer, then as a spinner and assistant foreman, and was recognized as a Stakhanovite for her hard work. She reported working "12-hour shifts" with only one day off each week.

Gadyuchkina married Sergey Petrovich Gadyuchkin, a naval officer, living initially with his sister's family in a single room. Later, when Sergey was promoted, they were given separate housing. They had five children, three of whom survived to adulthood: two sons, Sergei and Evgeny, and one daughter, Rita. Her husband died from a workplace injury in 1956, but she never remarried, saying that "a stranger wouldn't want her children".

=== Old age and death ===
In November 2014, she was reported to have six grandchildren, eight great-grandchildren, and two great-great-grandchildren. In her old age, she became an avid reader, and was said to "devote all her free time to reading". She read books and newspapers and tried to stay up-to-date on sociopolitical matters. In January 2022, she visited the Yasnye Zori sanitorium in Yaroslavl. As of May 2025 she continued to live with her family in Yaroslavl and was looked after by her many relatives.

Gadyuchkina died on 29 November 2025, at the age of 114 years and 359 days, a few days after being hospitalised. At the time of her death, she was the oldest living Russian person, and the oldest Russian ever recorded.
