= Romanovo-Borisoglebsky Uyezd =

Romanovo-Borisoglebsky Uyezd (Романово-Борисоглебский уезд) was one of the subdivisions of the Yaroslavl Governorate of the Russian Empire. It was situated in the central part of the governorate. Its administrative centre was Romanov-Borisoglebsk (Tutayev).

== Demographics ==
At the time of the Russian Empire Census of 1897, Romanovo-Borisoglebsky Uyezd had a population of 75,268. Of these, 99.8% spoke Russian and 0.1% Latvian as their native language.
