= 1st Guards Fortified Region =

1st Guards Fortified Region; 76th Fortified Region (until 4 May 1943)
- Active: 24 April 1942 – 4 July 1946
- Country: Soviet Union
- Branch: Red Army
- Type: Fortified region
- Engagements: World War II; Battle of Stalingrad; Kotelnikovo Offensive; Rostov Offensive; Donbas Offensive; Melitopol Offensive; Bereznegovatoye–Snigirevka offensive; Odessa Offensive; Second Jassy–Kishinev offensive; Belgrade Offensive; Budapest Offensive; Balaton Defensive Operation
- Decorations: Order of the Red Banner
- Honorifics: Nikolayev

Commanders
- Notable commanders: Pyotr Sakseyev; Sergey Nikitin

The 1st Guards Fortified Region (Russian: 1-й гвардейский укреплённый район, also translated as 1st Guards Fortified District) was a field fortified region of the Red Army during World War II. It was formed in early 1942 as the 76th Fortified Region and became the only fortified region to receive elite Guards status for its performance in the Rostov Offensive of 1943.

== History ==
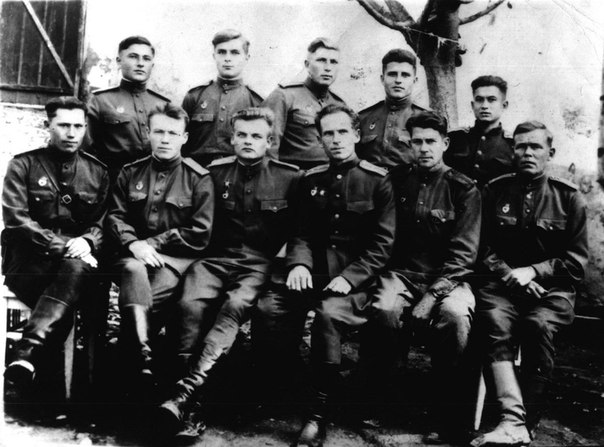
Officers of the 1st Guards Fortified Region

The 76th Fortified Region was formed at Kuznetsk in the Volga Military District between 24 April and 5 May 1942. Colonel Pyotr Sakseyev, who had previously held logistics posts, was selected to command the new unit. It included the 42nd, 45th, 46th, 47th, 48th, and 49th Separate Machine Gun Artillery Battalions. The region remained in the district until relocating to the Southeastern Front between 31 July and 12 August. It was assigned to the front's 57th Army on arrival. During the Battle of Stalingrad, the region fought in defensive battles to the south of the city. The army was shifted to the Stalingrad Front on 30 September. The region was transferred to the front's 51st Army on 6 November. It took part in the Kotelnikovo Offensive during the Soviet counteroffensive at Stalingrad. The 51st Army was shifted to the Southern Front on 1 January 1943, taking part in the Rostov Offensive in the first months of the new year. On 14 March the region was withdrawn to the front reserve. On 25 March it was assigned to the 2nd Guards Mechanized Corps of the front's 2nd Guards Army. On 13 April the region was placed under direct front control.

On 4 May 1943, the 76th was reorganized into the elite 1st Guards Fortified Region for its performance in the Rostov Offensive. On 13 May it was assigned to the front's 28th Army. On 10 July it shifted to the front's 55th Rifle Corps, and then to the 44th Army on 11 August. The region took part in the Donbass Strategic Offensive during August and September, being involved in the liberation of Taganrog and Osipenko. The region returned to the 28th Army on 10 September. Colonel Sergey Ivanovich Nikitin, relieved of command of the 4th Guards Rifle Division, became acting fortified region commander on 25 September, after Sakseyev was promoted to command the 24th Guards Rifle Division.

The fortified region took part in the Melitopol Offensive, breaking through German defenses on the Molochnaya in the region of Melitopol. When the Southern Front became the 4th Ukrainian Front, the region was placed under the control of the 28th Army's 130th Rifle Division on 20 October. It returned to army control on 26 November, and shifted to the 51st Army on 5 November. It was transferred to the 2nd Guards Army on 15 November, and subordinated to the army's 13th Guards Rifle Corps on 20 November. On 12 December the fortified region returned to 2nd Guards Army direct control.

The fortified region was transferred to the front's 28th Army on 23 February 1944, and on 28 February the army shifted to the 3rd Ukrainian Front, with which the fortified region spent the rest of the war. The fortified region took part in the Bereznegovatoye–Snigirevka offensive and then the Odessa Offensive that began in late March. During these operations, the fortified region forced a crossing of the Dniester-Southern Bug estuary and took part in the liberation of Nikolayev and Ochakov. The fortified region was transferred to the 5th Shock Army on 29 March. The fortified region received the Nikolayev honorific on 1 April 1944 for its performance in the liberation of the city of Nikolayev. On 3 April it received the Order of the Red Banner for its performance in the liberation of Ochakov. On 6 April, much of its headquarters was killed and the unit Guards Banner lost when the trawler moving them forward was blown up by a mine. 23 officers and 30 sergeants and privates were killed with only two men saved.

On 19 April it was shifted to the front's 8th Guards Army. On 29 April it was shifted to the front's 46th Army. On 20 August it was subordinated to the army's Operational Group Bakhtin for the Second Jassy–Kishinev Offensive. On 29 August it was shifted to the front's 57th Army. It was relocated between 14 and 27 September before rejoining the 57th Army, taking part in the Belgrade Offensive. On 11 October it was subordinated to the army's 64th Rifle Corps, and to its 68th Rifle Corps on 3 November. The fortified region took part in the Budapest Offensive.

On 24 December it was transferred to the front's 4th Guards Army, and on 26 December subordinated to the army's 21st Guards Rifle Corps. The fortified region was shifted to the army's 135th Rifle Corps on 6 January 1945. On 17 January, the region was at 90 percent strength in personnel with 3,122 officers and men. Early on the morning of 18 January, the positions of the fortified region were broken through by German tanks in Operation Konrad III, and its men encircled. That day the fortified region was placed under direct army control. The fortified region reported its losses in these actions as 2,232 men by the end of 22 January. Among the losses were four battalion commanders, the chiefs of its operations department and artillery, and deputy chief for political affairs. The 1st Guards Fortified Region reported the loss of 38 76 mm guns, 31 45 mm guns, seven 120 mm mortars, 33 82 mm mortars, 128 heavy machine guns, 114 light machine guns, 1,093 rifles and carbines, and 237 PPSh submachine guns, as well as all of its communications and engineer equipment. By 23 January 751 men from the unit who made it out of the encirclement concentrated at Tamási. The 1st Guards Fortified Region was transferred to the front's 7th Mechanized Corps on 29 January. The fortified region was withdrawn to the front reserve on 3 February, and on 12 February assigned to the front's 26th Army. It was transferred to the 4th Guards Army on 23 February, and on 7 March to the 35th Guards Rifle Corps of the 27th Army. It took part in the Balaton Defensive Operation.

On 28 March it was transferred to the 27th Army's 37th Rifle Corps. The fortified region was subordinated to the corps' 316th Rifle Division on 1 April and then the 35th Guards Rifle Corps' 163rd Rifle Division on 2 April. On 3 April the fortified region came under the direct control of the corps, and on 4 April it was shifted to the control of the 57th Army. Nikitin was moved up to chief of the front's Combat and Physical Training Department and replaced by 113th Rifle Division commander Colonel Stepan Kiryan on 17 April. On 21 April it was shifted to the 4th Guards Army, and on 26 April subordinated to the army's 31st Guards Rifle Corps.

== Postwar ==
After the end of the war, the fortified region was transferred to the direct control of the 3rd Ukrainian Front on 3 June, and transferred to the Southern Group of Forces on 15 June. The 1st Guards Fortified Region was withdrawn to the Odesa Military District on 16 August. The fortified region was disbanded in the Odesa Military District between 17 May and 4 July 1946.

== Commanders ==
The following officers, holding the title of commandant, commanded the fortified region:

- Colonel Pyotr Ivanovich Sakseyev (24 April 1942 – 24 September 1943)
- Colonel Sergey Ivanovich Nikitin (25 September 1943–c. 15 April 1945)
- Colonel Stepan Vasilyevich Kiryan (17 April–5 November 1945)
- General-mayor Yeremey Zakharovich Karamanov (5 November 1945 – 30 June 1946)

The following officers served as chiefs of staff of the fortified region:

- Major Nikolay Fyodorovich Likholetov (24 April–20 November 1942)
- Colonel Vasily Ivanovich Argunov (20 November 1942 – 6 June 1946)

== Order of battle ==
The following machine gun artillery battalions were assigned to the fortified region during its existence:

- 42nd Separate Machine Gun Artillery Battalion (5 May–5 November 1942)
- 45th Separate Machine Gun Artillery Battalion (5 May–20 November 1942)
- 46th Separate Machine Gun Artillery Battalion (5 May–30 July 1943)
- 47th Separate Machine Gun Artillery Battalion (5 May–5 November 1942)
- 48th Separate Machine Gun Artillery Battalion (5 May–5 November 1942)
- 49th Separate Machine Gun Artillery Battalion (5 May–5 November 1942)
- 51st Separate Machine Gun Artillery Battalion (5 November 1942 – 30 July 1943)
- 36th Separate Machine Gun Artillery Battalion (9 May–30 July 1943)
- 168th Separate Machine Gun Artillery Battalion (9 May–30 July 1943)
- 170th Separate Machine Gun Artillery Battalion (9 May–30 July 1943)
- 148th Separate Machine Gun Artillery Battalion (10 August–1 September 1943)
- 2nd Guards Separate Machine Gun Artillery Battalion (10 August 1943 – 20 June 1946), converted from the 46th Separate Machine Gun Artillery Battalion 1 July 1943
- 8th Guards Separate Machine Gun Artillery Battalion (10 August 1943 – 20 June 1946), converted from 51st Separate Machine Gun Artillery Battalion 4 May 1943
- 9th Guards Separate Machine Gun Artillery Battalion (10 August 1943 – 20 June 1946), converted from 36th Separate Machine Gun Artillery Battalion 4 May 1943
- 10th Guards Separate Machine Gun Artillery Battalion (10 August 1943 – 20 June 1946), converted from 170th Separate Machine Gun Artillery Battalion 23 May 1943
- 11th Guards Separate Machine Gun Artillery Battalion (10 August 1943 – 20 June 1946), converted from 168th Separate Machine Gun Artillery Battalion 4 May 1943

Support units included:

- 161st Separate Trench Flamethrower Company (25 April 1942 – 30 July 1943)
- 376th Separate Signals Company (25 April 1942 – 30 July 1943)
- 33rd Guards Separate Signals Company (30 July 1943 – 20 June 1946)
- 2356th Field Postal Station (20 December 1942 – 20 February 1943)
- 40202nd Field Postal Station (20 April 1943–Unknown)
- 156th Separate Motor Rifle Battalion (1 August 1942 – 20 February 1943)
- Separate Training Machine Gun Artillery Battalion (1 January–20 June 1946)
- 41st Separate Engineer Company (1 January–20 June 1946)
- 867th Auto-Transport Company (1 January–20 June 1946)
- 670th Medical-Sanitary Company (1 January–20 June 1946)
- 835th Field Bakery (1 January–20 June 1946)
