= Lyubimsky Uyezd =

Subdivision of Russian Empire

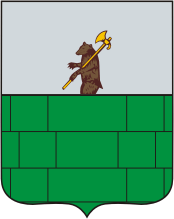
Coat of arms of Lyubim (1778)

Lyubimsky Uyezd (Любимский уезд) was one of the subdivisions of the Yaroslavl Governorate of the Russian Empire. It was situated in the northeastern part of the governorate. Its administrative centre was Lyubim.

== Demographics ==
At the time of the Russian Empire Census of 1897, Lyubimsky Uyezd had a population of 65,230. Of these, 99.9% spoke Russian as their native language.
