= Rostovsky Uyezd (Yaroslavl Governorate) =

Rostovsky Uyezd (Ростовский уезд) was one of the subdivisions of the Yaroslavl Governorate of the Russian Empire. It was situated in the southern part of the governorate. Its administrative centre was Rostov.

== Demographics ==
At the time of the Russian Empire Census of 1897, Rostovsky Uyezd had a population of 148,970. Of these, 99.5% spoke Russian, 0.1% Polish, 0.1% Yiddish, 0.1% German and 0.1% Ukrainian as their native language.
