= Karl Peterson =

Latvian Social Democratic Workers' Party politician

Karl Andreevich Peterson
- Карл Андреевич Петерсон

2nd Commissioner of the Latvian Riflemen
- In office 13 April 1918 – Unspecified
- Preceded by: Semyon Nakhimson

Personal details
- Born: 1877 Latvia
- Died: 17 January 1926 (aged 48–49) Novorossiysk, Soviet Union

Karl Andreevich Peterson (Latvian: Kārlis Pētersons; 1877 – 17 January 1926) was a Latvian Marxist revolutionary, Soviet statesman, military and party leader, and an active participant in the Civil War in Russia.

== Biography ==
Born into the family of a tenant, he studied at the volost school. In 1895, he moved to Riga, where he first worked as a laborer and then as a reporter for various democratic newspapers. In 1898, he joined the Russian Social Democratic Labour Party. In the same year, he organized one of the first social democratic circles in Latvia. In 1899, a member of the Riga Committee of the Russian Social Democratic Labor Party, since 1900, he has been conducting party work in Libava. In 1901, he was arrested and sentenced to 3 years of exile in Siberia. Upon his return in April 1904, at the party propaganda work in Riga and Libava, he participated in organizing unrest among agricultural workers.

In 1908, he was transferred to revolutionary work in Moscow, where he was again arrested and sentenced to 1 year of imprisonment in a fortress. Returning to Riga in 1911, he became the editor of various social–democratic party publications – the newspaper Laika Balss (Voice of the Time), and others. At the end of 1912, he was arrested again and sent to a settlement in the Arkhangelsk Governorate for 3 years. At the end of 1915, he returned to Petrograd, where he worked as a secretary of the health insurance fund at the Krasny Triangle factory.

In 1916, in the army, served in the reserve regiment of Latvian Riflemen in the city of Valmiera. In 1917, he was a member of the Executive Committee of the Joint Council of Latvian Rifle Regiments, delegate and representative of Latvian Riflemen at the 2nd All–Russian Congress of Soviets. At the 2nd, 3rd, 4th, 5th and 6th All–Russian Congresses of Soviets, he was elected a member of the All–Russian Central Executive Committee. Member of the All–Russian Extraordinary Commission on 1 January 1918. On 13 April 1918, by order of the People's Commissar For Military Affairs of the Russian Socialist Federative Soviet Republic, he was appointed Commissar of the Latvian Division. In 1919, he was a member of the government of Soviet Latvia, People's Commissar For Military Affairs and a member of the Revolutionary Military Council of the Army of Soviet Latvia. In 1920 – military commissar of the Yenisey Governorate, from November 1920 to January 1921 – a member of the Revolutionary Military Council of the 5th Army of the Eastern Front. Since 1921 – authorized by the People's Commissariat of Foreign Affairs in Novorossiysk.

He died in 1926 from tuberculosis.

== Sources ==
- Nikolay Kondratyev. "Comrade Peterson", Riga, 1959
- Petr Yeran, ed. (1989). Riga: Encyclopedia (1st ed.). Riga: Main Editorial Office of Encyclopedias. p. 551. ISBN 5-89960-002-0.
