= Kesova Gora =

Kesova Gora Кесова Гора
- Work settlement
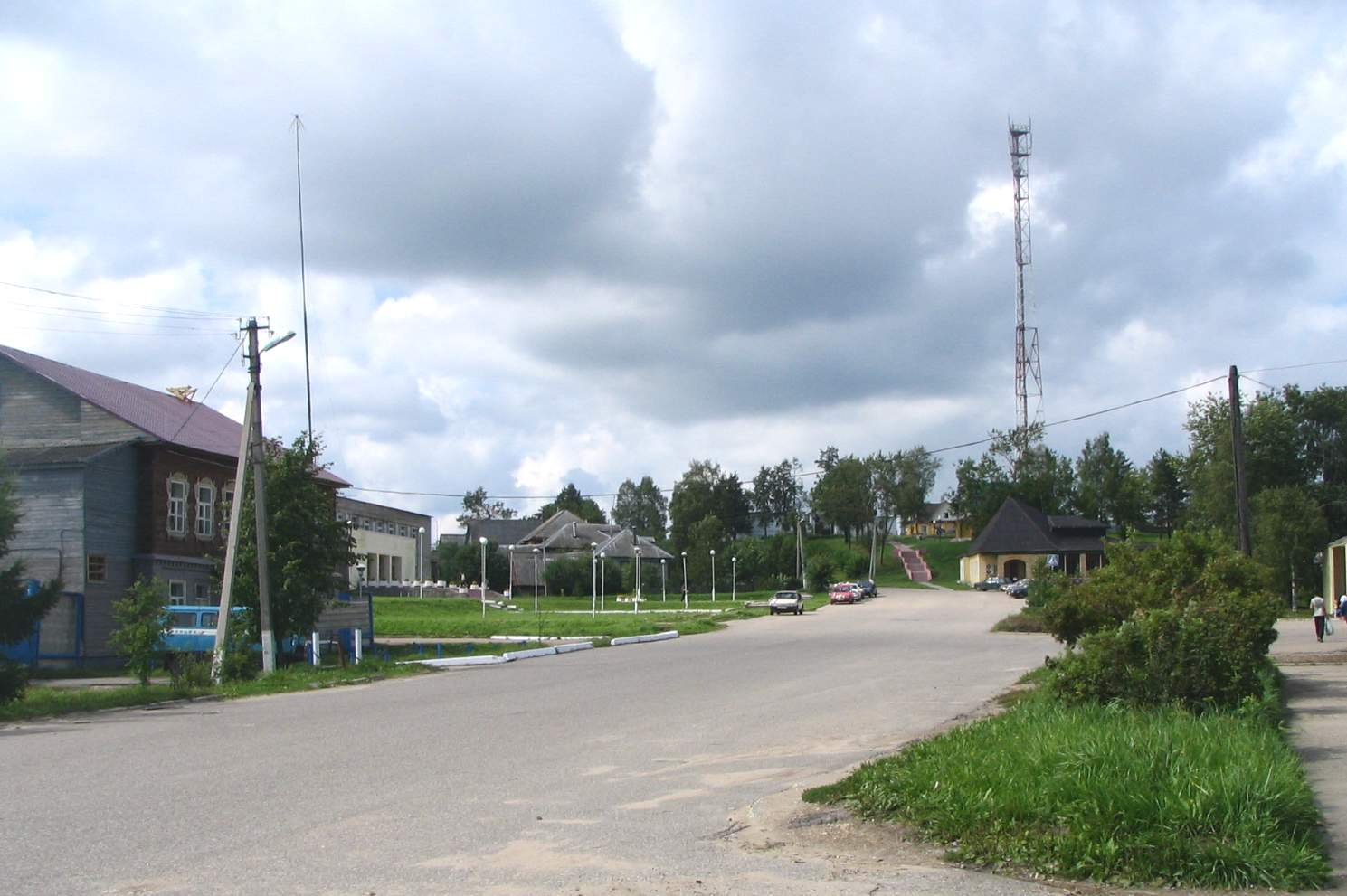
- The center of Kesova Gora

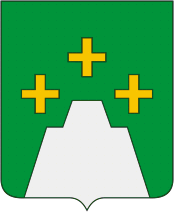
- Coat of arms
- Interactive map of Kesova Gora
- Location of Kesova Gora Kesova Gora (Tver Oblast)
- Coordinates: 57°35′N 37°17′E
- Country: Russia
- Federal subject: Tver Oblast
- Administrative district: Kesovogorsky District

Population (2010 Census)
  - Total: 3,877
  - Estimate (2021): 3,746 (−3.4%)

Administrative status
  - Capital of: Kesovogorsky District

Municipal status
  - Municipal district: Kesovogorsky Municipal District
  - Urban settlement: Urban Settlement Kesova Gora
  - Capital of: Kesovogorsky Municipal District, Urban Settlement Kesova Gora
- Time zone: UTC+3 (MSK)
- Postal code: 171470
- OKTMO ID: 28626151051

Kesova Gora (Russian: Ке́сова Гора́) is an urban locality (an urban-type settlement) and the administrative center of Kesovogorsky District of Tver Oblast, Russia, located 32 kilometers (20 mi) from Kashin and 50 kilometers (31 mi) from Bezhetsk. Population: 3,877 (2010 census); 4,076 (2002 census); 4,208 (1989 Soviet census).

== History ==
Kesova Gora was known since approximately 1238, and it apparently was formed from a combination various smaller settlements: Krasny, Zaychy, and Grachi. Originally, the settlement was called Kyasova Gora, meaning "clay-filled region" in Finnish. For a long time, it was a votchina of the Prozorovsky noble family. One of the most important landmarks of the settlement is the still-functioning Saint Nicholas Church.

In the course of the administrative reform carried out in 1708 by Peter the Great, Kesova Gora was included into Ingermanland Governorate (known since 1710 as Saint Petersburg Governorate), but in 1727 it was transferred to Moscow Governorate. In 1775, Tver Viceroyalty was formed from the lands which previously belonged to Moscow and Novgorod Governorates. Kesova Gora was a part of Kashinsky Uyezd of Tver Viceroyalty. In 1796, Tver Viceroyalty was transformed into Tver Governorate. On October 3, 1927 Kashinsky Uyezd was abolished; Kesova Gora was transferred to Bezhetsky Uyezd.

On July 12, 1929 the governorates and uyezds were abolished. Kesovsky District, with the administrative center in Kesova Gora, was established within Bezhetsk Okrug of Moscow Oblast. Shortly afterwards, the district was renamed Kesovogorsky. On July 23, 1930, the okrugs were abolished, and the districts were directly subordinated to the oblast. On January 29, 1935 Kalinin Oblast was established, and Kesovogorsky District was transferred to Tver Oblast. On February 13, 1963, during the abortive Khrushchyov administrative reform, Sonkovsky District was merged into Bezhetsky District, but on January 12, 1965 it was re-established. In 1975, Kesova Gora was granted urban-type settlement status.

== Economy ==
=== Industry ===
Kesova Gora's economy is primarily agriculture-based. There is also a bread-making factory, a linen factory, and a milk and meat packing company in the settlement.

=== Transportation ===
The main form of transportation in the settlement is the passenger train which makes a stop at the historic wooden town train station (constructed in 1895) two or more times a day. The train travels from nearby Sonkovo to Savyolovo, and back. A more frequent bus service is also available in the area, but it only travels to closer locations. A road that travels from Kashin to Bezhetsk also passes through the settlement.

== Culture and recreation ==
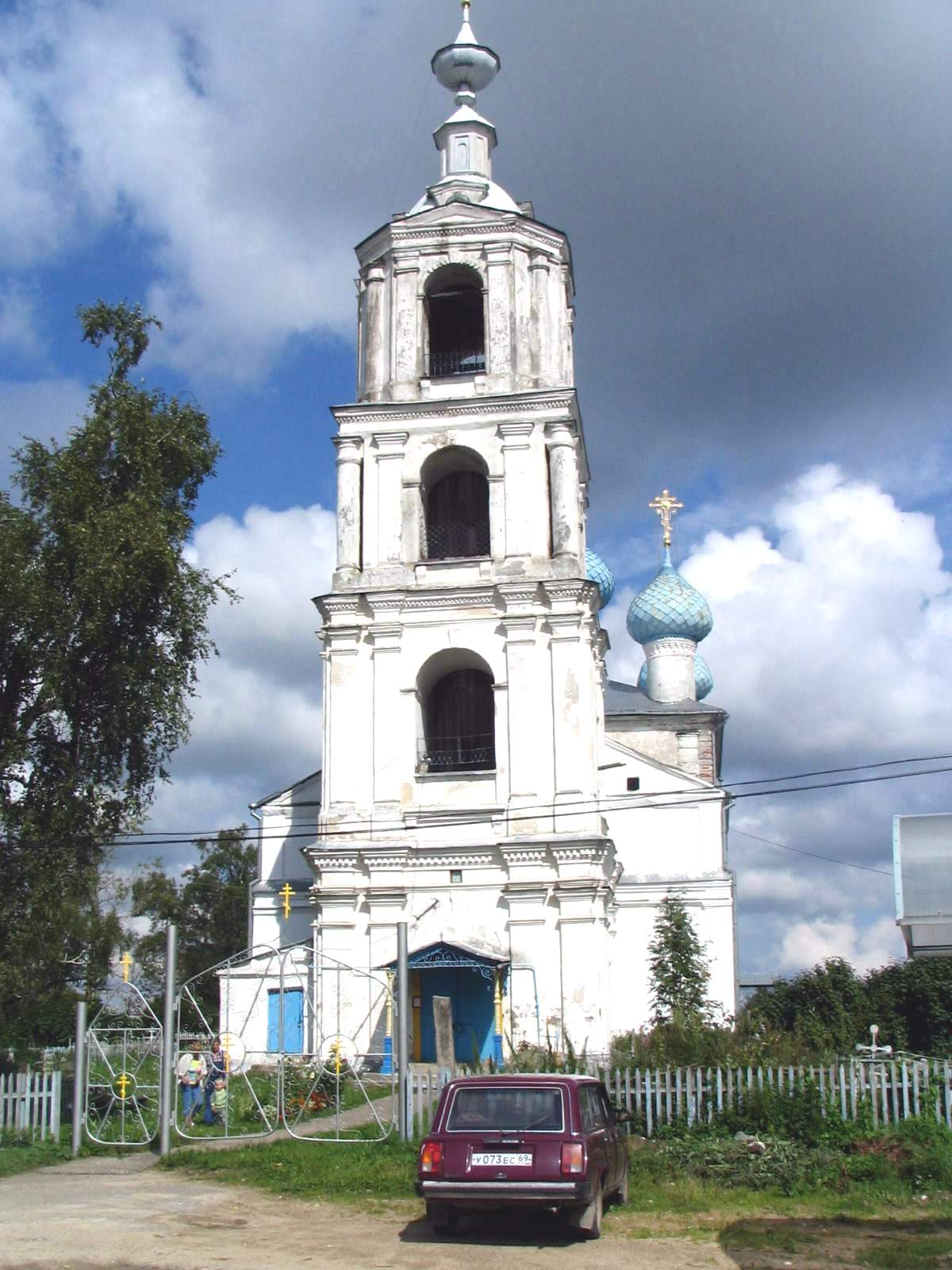
Saint Nicholas Church.

Kesova Gora contains one cultural heritage monuments of federal significance and additionally two objects classified as cultural and historical heritage of local significance. The federal monument is the Saint Nicholas Church (1770s) whereas the local monuments are the Transfiguration Church (1800) and the monument to Aleksey Alelyukhin, a military pilot and double Hero of the Soviet Union, who was born in Kesova Gora.

There is a local museum in Kesova Gora.
