= Uglichsky Uyezd =

Uglichsky Uyezd (Угличский уезд) was one of the subdivisions of the Yaroslavl Governorate of the Russian Empire. It was situated in the southwestern part of the governorate. Its administrative centre was Uglich.

== Demographics ==
At the time of the Russian Empire Census of 1897, Uglichsky Uyezd had a population of 94,573. Of these, 99.3% spoke Russian and 0.7% Belarusian as their native language.
