= Yaroslavsky Uyezd =

Yaroslavsky Uyezd (Ярославский уезд) was one of the subdivisions of the Yaroslavl Governorate of the Russian Empire. It was situated in the southeastern part of the governorate. Its administrative centre was Yaroslavl.

== Demographics ==
At the time of the Russian Empire Census of 1897, Yaroslavsky Uyezd had a population of 208,031. Of these, 98.4% spoke Russian, 0.4% Yiddish, 0.4% Polish, 0.3% Ukrainian, 0.2% German and 0.1% Tatar as their native language.
