= Mologsky Uyezd =

Mologsky Uyezd (Мологский уезд) was one of the subdivisions of the Yaroslavl Governorate of the Russian Empire. It was situated in the northwestern part of the governorate. Its administrative centre was Mologa.

== Demographics ==
At the time of the Russian Empire Census of 1897, Mologsky Uyezd had a population of 117,696. Of these, 99.9% spoke Russian as their native language.
