= Danilovsky Uyezd =

Subdivision of the Russian Empire

Danilovsky Uyezd (Даниловский уезд) was one of the subdivisions of the Yaroslavl Governorate of the Russian Empire. It was situated in the northeastern part of the governorate. Its administrative centre was Danilov.

== Demographics ==
At the time of the Russian Empire Census of 1897, Danilovsky Uyezd had a population of 70,740. Of these, 99.7% spoke Russian, 0.1% Latvian and 0.1% Yiddish as their native language.
