= The Revelation in Storm and Thunder =

Book by Nikolai Alexandrovich Morozov

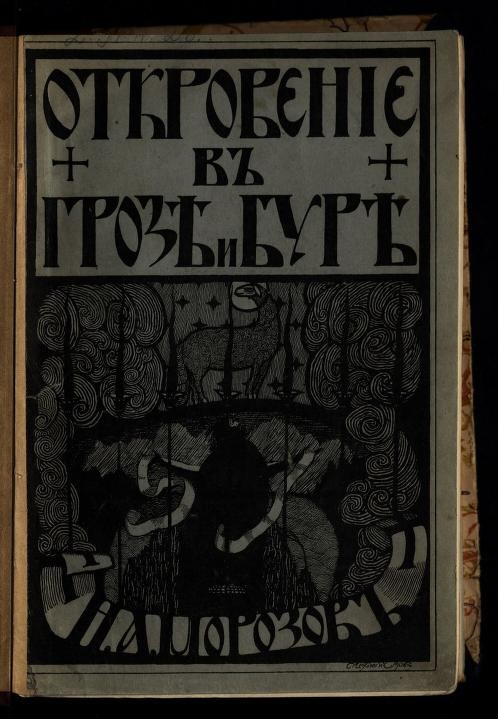
- Author: Nikolai Alexandrovich Morozov
- Original title: Откровение в грозе и буре
- Language: Russian
- Subject: Pseudohistory
- Genre: Non-fiction
- Publication date: March 1907
- ISBN: 978-3903241572

The Revelation in Storm and Thunder (Russian: «Откровение в грозе и буре») is a pseudoscientific book by the Russian revolutionary and self‑taught astronomer Nikolai Morozov, first published in March 1907.

In his treatise, Morozov argues that the Book of Revelation, commonly dated to 95 AD, reflects the astronomical configuration of the constellations visible above the island of Patmos on Sunday, 30 September 395 (Julian calendar). However, if this date is correct, the Apostle John could not have been the author of the Apocalypse. Therefore, it must have been another John — most likely John Chrysostom (347–407 AD), one of the most prominent Church Fathers. According to Morozov, the Apocalypse was composed not in the 1st century, but at the end of the 4th century. At the same time, he also shifts the dating of Jesus Christ’s life to the 4th century. Firmly believing his dating to be based on precise astronomical data, Morozov disregarded critics' arguments that his "astronomical data" constituted an arbitrary reading of a metaphorical text.

== Morozov's claims ==
1. The weekday of the event is named explicitly:

- Rev. 1,10: I was in the Spirit on the Lord's Day (believed to be Sunday).

2. The description of the skies starts with a constellation named Throne (Morozov identifies it as Cassiopeia):

- Rev. 4,2: and behold, a throne was standing in heaven...

3. According to Morozov, the text refers to the Milky Way and four seasonal zodiacal markers:

- Rev. 4,6-7: And before the throne there was something like a sea of glass, like crystal; and in the center and around the throne, four living creatures full of eyes in front and behind. The first living creature was like a lion, the second creature like a calf, the third creature had a face like that of a man, and the fourth creature was like a flying eagle.

4. The four horses were interpreted by Morozov as traditional metaphors for the planets Jupiter, Mars, Mercury and Saturn. The constellations Sagittarius, Perseus, Libra and Scorpion were sitting on them:

- Rev. 6,2: I looked, and behold, a white horse, and the one who sat on it had a bow;
- Rev. 6,4: And another, a red horse, went out; and to him who sat on it, it was granted to take peace from the earth, and that people would kill one another; and a large sword was given to him.
- Rev. 6,5: I looked, and behold, a black horse, and the one who sat on it had a pair of scales in his hand.
- Rev. 6,8: I looked, and behold, an ashen horse; and the one who sat on it had the name Death, and Hades was following with him.

5. Sun and Moon were named explicitly. The only female character of the zodiac is Virgo:

- Rev. 12,1: A great sign appeared in heaven: a woman clothed with the sun, and the moon under her feet, and on her head a crown of twelve stars.

6. The planet Venus , used as a symbol of female eroticism and harlotry, united with the red star Antares (Anti-Mars) within the constellation Scorpion:

- Rev. 17,3-4: and I saw a woman sitting on a scarlet beast, full of blasphemous names, having seven heads and ten horns. The woman was clothed in purple and scarlet, and adorned with gold, precious stones, and pearls, holding in her hand a gold cup full of abominations and of the unclean things of her sexual immorality.

In Morozov’s view, the description in the Book of Revelation matches exactly the configuration of constellations for 30 September 395 (Julian).

	Figure of Rev.	Assignment	Constellation	~Right asc.	Body	Right ascension	Declination
1	Sun	Woman (dress)	Virgo	12h - 14h	Sun	12h 27m 56s	-3° 02.9
2	Moon	Woman (feet)	Virgo	12h - 14h	Moon	12h 19m 00s	-2° 50.5
3	White horse	Bow	Sagittarius	16h - 18h	Jupiter	17h 56m 56s	-24° 01.5
4	Pale horse	Death	Scorpion	14h - 16h	Saturn	14h 40m 40s	-13° 45.5
5	Dark horse	Balances	Libra	12h - 14h	Mercury	13h 52m 38s	-14° 54.5
6	Red horse	Swordsman	Perseus / Aries	00h - 02h	Mars	00h 59m 38s	+3° 31.2
7	Woman / Whore	Red beast	Antares, Scorpion	14h 55m	Venus	14h 54m 50s	18° 22.9

Right ascension and Declination for the island of Patmos at 15:00 UTC on this day were calculated using the program Yoursky. (Due to precession R.A. of the stars has been shifted since 395).

Sun, Moon and the 3 outer and 2 inner planets will produce 3.732.480 combinations within the 12 signs of the zodiac (12^{5} × 5 × 3). Therefore, an accidental match is quite unlikely.

Morozov presumes that the educated John was able to calculate the Saros cycle and, therefore, did observe the sky on this day in attendance of a solar eclipse. (This eclipse did occur indeed—over South America, however.)

== Literature ==
- Morozov, N. A. Откровение в грозе и буре. История возникновения Апокалипсиса (The Revelation in Storm and Thunder: The History of the Apocalypse’s Origin). Saint Petersburg: Byloye, 1907.
- Morozov, N. A. Die Offenbarung Johannis – Eine astronomisch-historische Untersuchung (The Revelation of St. John: An Astronomical‑Historical Investigation). Stuttgart, 1912. 223 p.
- Bobrovnikoff, N.T. (1941). "Pseudo-Science and Revelation" (PDF). Popular Astronomy. 49 (49): 251–257. Bibcode:1941PA.....49..251B. Archived (PDF) from the original on 2022-02-16. - gives a critique of Morozov's dating of the Book of Revelation.

== Notes ==
This article is a translation from the German Wikipedia.
