= Norskoye =

Norskoye Норское
- Village
- Location within Ivanovo Oblast Location within Russia
- Coordinates: 57°26′N 42°32′E
- Country: Russia
- Region: Ivanovo Oblast
- District: Kineshemsky District
- Time zone: UTC+3:00

Norskoye (Russian: Норское) is a rural locality (a village) in Kineshemsky District, Ivanovo Oblast, Russia. Population: 79 (2010 census);

== Geography ==
This rural locality is located 25 kilometres (16 mi) from Kineshma (the district's administrative centre), 107 kilometres (66 mi) from Ivanovo (capital of Ivanovo Oblast) and 350 kilometres (220 mi) from Moscow. Kozlikha is the nearest rural locality.
