= Shepeli =

Shepeli Шепели
- Village
- Location within Vladimir Oblast Location within Russia
- Coordinates: 55°54′N 40°01′E
- Country: Russia
- Region: Vladimir Oblast
- District: Sobinsky District
- Time zone: UTC+3:00

Shepeli (Russian: Шепели) is a rural locality, or village in Bereznikovskoye Rural Settlement, Sobinsky District, Vladimir Oblast, Russia. The population was 35 as of 2010.

== Geography ==
Shepeli is situated 13 km south of Sobinka, the district's administrative centre, by road. Levino is the nearest rural locality.
