= Kashin (town) =

Town in Tver Oblast, Russia

Kashin Кашин
- Town
- Lunačarskogo street

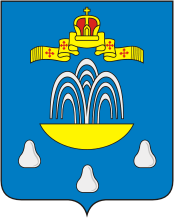
- Flag Coat of arms
- Interactive map of Kashin
- Location of Kashin Kashin (Tver Oblast)
- Coordinates: 57°21′N 37°37′E
- Country: Russia
- Federal subject: Tver Oblast
- Administrative district: Kashinsky District
- Urban settlementSelsoviet: Kashin
- First mentioned: 1238
- Elevation: 125 m (410 ft)

Population (2010 Census)
  - Total: 16,171
  - Estimate (2025): 13,444 (−16.9%)

Administrative status
  - Capital of: Kashinsky District, Kashin Urban Settlement

Municipal status
  - Municipal district: Kashinsky Municipal District
  - Urban settlement: Kashin Urban Settlement
  - Capital of: Kashinsky Municipal District, Kashin Urban Settlement
- Time zone: UTC+3 (MSK)
- Postal codes: 171640–171642, 171645, 171649
- OKTMO ID: 28624101001

Kashin (Russian: Ка́шин) is a town and the administrative center of Kashinsky District in Tver Oblast, Russia, located around a rural agricultural area on the Kashinka River (Volga's tributary). Population: 16,171 (2010 census); 17,299 (2002 census); 21,186 (1989 Soviet census); 18,000 (1970).

== History ==
Kashin was first mentioned in a chronicle under the year of 1238, when it was sacked during the Mongol invasion. It was given by Grand Duke Mikhail Yaroslavich as an appanage to his son Vasily, who founded a short-lived dynasty of local princes. Mikhail Yaroslavich's wife Anna took the veil in Kashin's nunnery, died there on October 2, 1368, and was glorified by the Russian Orthodox Church in 1650 as a holy patroness of all women who suffer the loss of relatives. Her relics are preserved in the Ascension Cathedral of Kashin.

In 1382, Kashin was annexed by Principality of Tver. From 1399 to 1426, it was held by a second dynasty of Kashin princes, who claimed their seniority in the House of Tver. In 1452, Kashin withstood a siege by Dmitry Shemyaka. It finally passed to the Grand Duchy of Moscow in 1486 with the rest of the Principality of Tver.

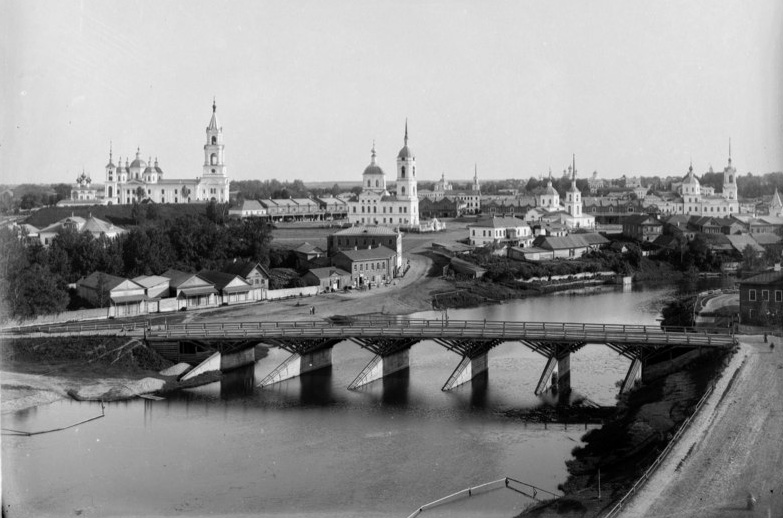
Kashin in 1894

In 1708, the town became a part of Ingermanland Governorate (known since 1710 as St. Petersburg Governorate), but in 1727 it was transferred to Moscow Governorate. In 1775, Tver Viceroyalty was formed from the lands which previously belonged to Moscow and Novgorod Governorates, and Kashinsky Uyezd with the seat in Kashin was established. In 1796, Tver Viceroyalty was transformed into Tver Governorate. On October 3, 1927, Kashinsky Uyezd was abolished and split between Bezhetsky and Kimrsky Uyezds. On July 12, 1929, Kashinsky District, with the administrative center in the Kashin, was established within Bezhetsk Okrug of Moscow Oblast. On July 23, 1930, the okrugs were abolished and the districts were directly subordinated to the oblast. On January 29, 1935, Kalinin Oblast was established and Kashin was transferred to it. In 1990, Kalinin Oblast was renamed Tver Oblast.

== Administrative and municipal status ==
Within the framework of administrative divisions, Kashin serves as the administrative center of Kashinsky District. As an administrative division, it is incorporated within Kashinsky District as Kashin Urban Settlement. As a municipal division, this administrative unit also has urban settlement status and is a part of Kashinsky Municipal District.

== Climate ==
The mean temperature in Kashin is −11 °C (12 °F) in January and +18 °C (64 °F) in July.

== Economy ==
The town is an important part of the oblast's economy. It is home to Veresk, one of the largest alcoholic drink producing companies in the region. Another major business is the mineral water company ERA, which produces the Kashinskaya brand of mineral water. There are also an electric equipment company, a wool factory, and a milk and meat-processing company.

Several times a week, a market is organized in the main square of the town where residents can sell various items. Also, fruit and vegetables from nearby rural farms are sold.

=== Transportation ===
Buses provide public transportation within the town and commute to nearby destinations. Also, a train passes through Kashin twice a day. The morning train travels from Sonkovo to Savyolovo, while the afternoon train travels in the opposite direction. Several times a week, a train from St. Petersburg stops in Kashin.

== Architecture ==
There are several architectural monuments in Kashin, including monasteries, churches, and cathedrals. The most ancient of these, a wooden chapel from 1646, was burned to the ground in 1998.

The town contains thirty-six cultural heritage monuments of federal significance, including the ensemble of the Presentation Monastery and a number of churches built in the 18th and the 19th centuries.

Ascension Cathedral

Resurrection Cathedral

== Culture ==
The Museum of Local Lore is located in Kashin. Also, in the village of Verkhnyaya Troitsa, situated 30 kilometers (19 mi) from Kashin, the house of Mikhail Kalinin, a Soviet statesman, is located.

== Recreation ==
There is a resort area near Kashin where many oblast residents spend their vacation near the Kashinka River. Kashin itself is known as a balneological resort. On holidays and special dates, the town hosts large festivals which involve dancing, food, and various performances.
