= Myshkinsky Uyezd =

Myshkinsky Uyezd (Мышкинский уезд) was one of the subdivisions of the Yaroslavl Governorate of the Russian Empire. It was situated in the western part of the governorate. Its administrative centre was Myshkin.

== Demographics ==
At the time of the Russian Empire Census of 1897, Myshkinsky Uyezd had a population of 87,030. Of these, 99.8% spoke Russian and 0.1% German as their native language.
