= Kashinsky Uyezd =

Subdivision of Russian Empire

Kashinsky Uyezd (Кашинский уезд) was one of the subdivisions of the Tver Governorate of the Russian Empire. It was situated in the northeastern part of the governorate. Its administrative centre was Kashin.

== Demographics ==
At the time of the Russian Empire Census of 1897, Kashinsky Uyezd had a population of 119,510. Of these, 99.9% spoke Russian as their native language.
