= Yaroslavl Governorate =

1777–1929 unit of Russia

Coordinates: 57.6167°N 39.8500°E

Yaroslavl Governorate Ярославская губерния
- Governorate of the Russian Empire
- 1777–1929
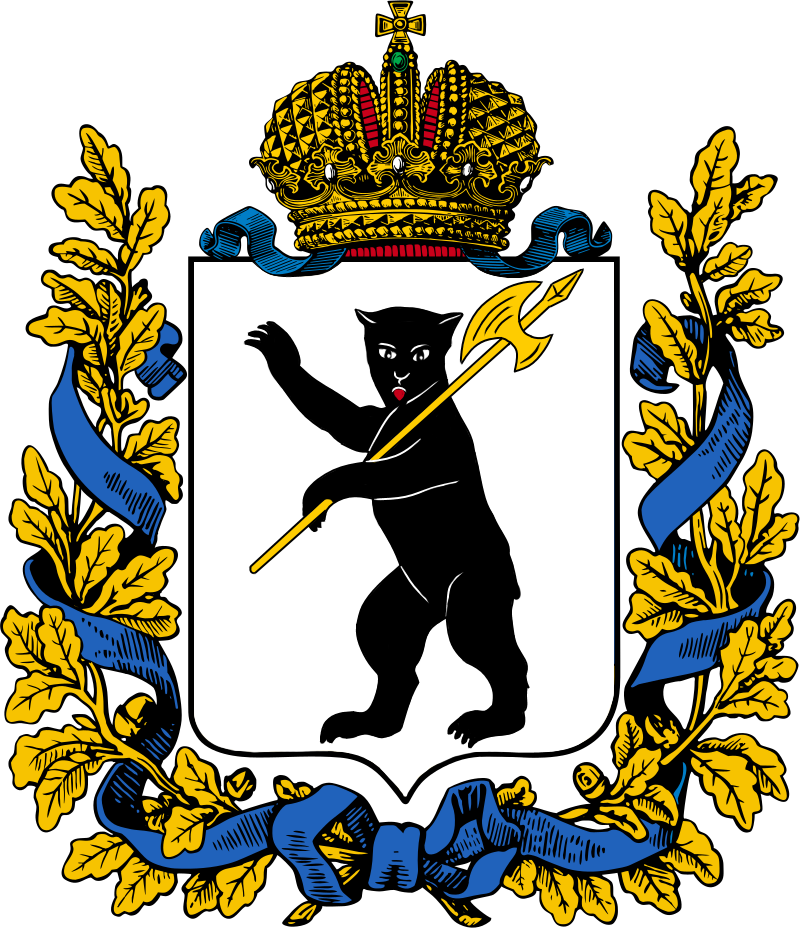
- Coat of arms

- Location in the Russian Empire
- Capital: Yaroslavl
- Area
- 35,615 km^{2} (13,751 sq mi)
- Population
- 1,166,800
- History
  - Established: 1777
  - Disestablished: 1929
Preceded by
Kostroma province
Uglich province
Yaroslavl province
Succeeded by
Rybinsk Okrug
Yaroslavl Okrug

Yaroslavl Governorate (Russian: Ярославская губерния, romanized: Yaroslavskaya guberniya) was an administrative-territorial unit (guberniya) of the Russian Empire and the Russian SFSR, located in European Russia in the Upper Volga Region. It existed from 1777 to 1929; its seat was in the city of Yaroslavl.

== Administrative division ==
Yaroslavl Governorate consisted of the following uyezds (administrative centres in parentheses):

- Danilovsky Uyezd (Danilov)
- Lyubimsky Uyezd (Lyubim)
- Mologsky Uyezd (Mologa)
- Myshkinsky Uyezd (Myshkin)
- Poshekhonsky Uyezd (Poshekhonye)
- Romanovo-Borisoglebsky Uyezd (Romanov-Borisoglebsk)
- Rostovsky Uyezd (Rostov)
- Rybinsky Uyezd (Rybinsk)
- Uglichsky Uyezd (Uglich)
- Yaroslavsky Uyezd (Yaroslavl)

== Demographics ==
Population by spoken language in Yaroslavl Governorate (1897)
Language	Native speakers	Percentage
Russian	1,064,525	99.3%
Yiddish	1,554	0.1%
Polish	1,420	0.1%
Other languages	3.856	0.5%
Total	1,071,355	100.00

== Notable people ==
- Klavdiya Gadyuchkina (1910-2025), supercentenarian and oldest Russian person ever recorded
