= Sknyatino =

Rural locality in Tver Oblast, Russia

Coordinates: 57°06′N 37°41′E

Sknyatino (Russian: Скнятино) is a village in Kalyazinsky District of Tver Oblast, Russia, situated at the confluence of the Nerl and the Volga Rivers, about halfway between Uglich and Tver. It is the site of the medieval town of Ksnyatin, founded by Yuri Dolgoruki in 1134 and named after his son Constantine. Ksnyatin was intended as a fortress to defend the Nerl waterway, leading to Yuri's residence at Pereslavl-Zalessky, against Novgorodians. The latter sacked it on several occasions, before the Mongols virtually annihilated the settlement in 1239. After that, it belonged to the princes of Tver and was devastated by their enemies in 1288. By the 14th century, the neighbouring towns of Kalyazin and Kashin superseded it in importance. Since 1459, Ksnyatin has been documented as a village. Its kremlin area and cathedral were flooded in 1939, when they created the Uglich Reservoir.
