= Bely Gorodok =

Bely Gorodok Белый Городок
- Work settlement
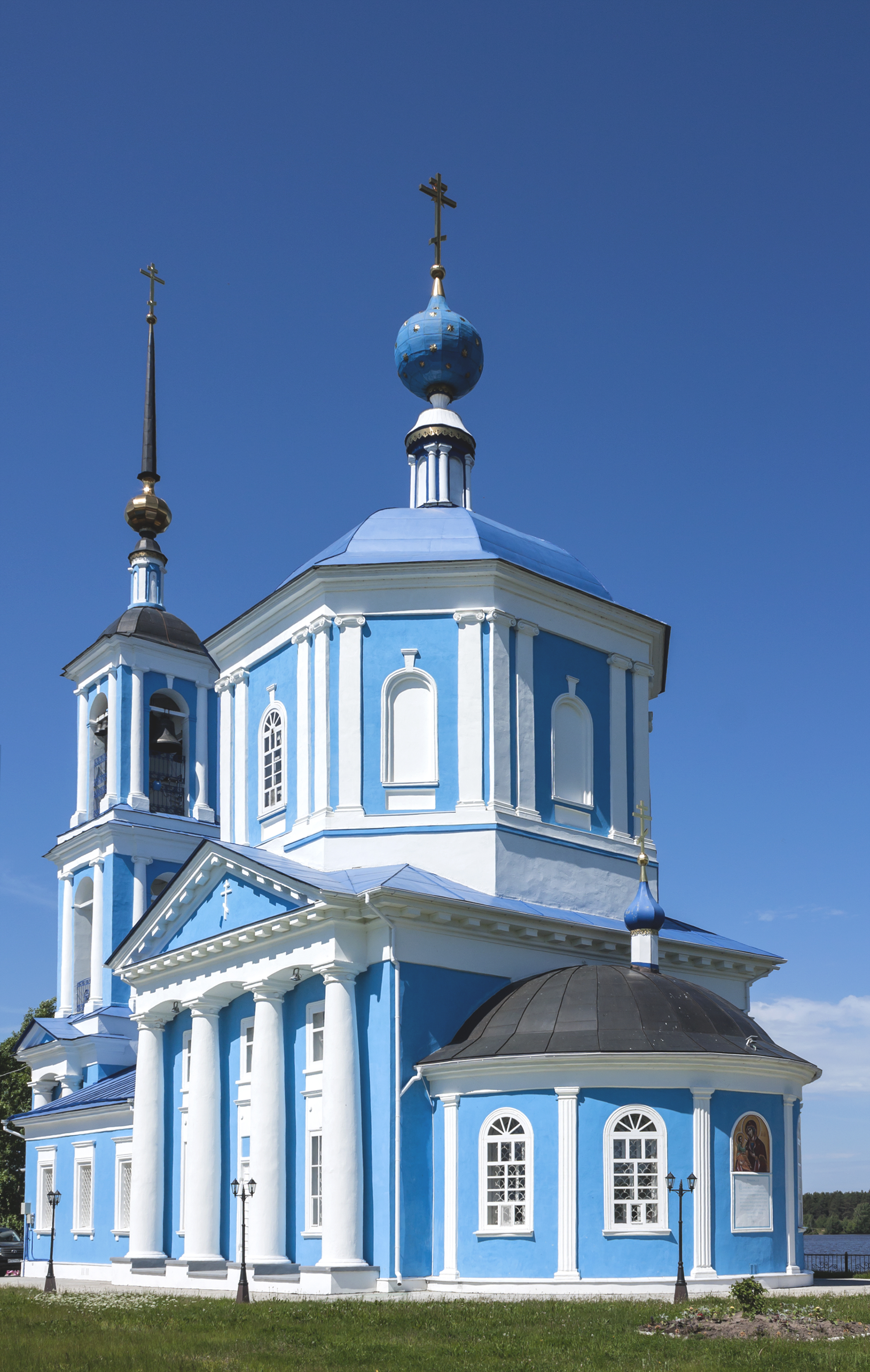
- Interactive map of Bely Gorodok
- Location of Bely Gorodok Bely Gorodok (Tver Oblast)
- Coordinates: 56°57′37″N 37°31′12″E
- Country: Russia
- Federal subject: Tver Oblast
- Administrative district: Kimrsky District
- Elevation: 120 m (390 ft)

Population (2010 Census)
  - Total: 2,432
  - Estimate (2021): 2,022 (−16.9%)

Municipal status
  - Municipal district: Kimrsky Municipal District
  - Urban settlement: Urban Settlement Bely Gorodok
  - Capital of: Urban Settlement Bely Gorodok
- Time zone: UTC+3 (MSK)
- Postal code: 171530
- OKTMO ID: 28528000052

Bely Gorodok (Russian: Бе́лый Городо́к) is an urban-type settlement in Kimrsky District of Tver Oblast, Russia. It is located on the right bank of the Volga River, at the confluence of the Khotcha River. Population: 2,432 (2010 census); 2,825 (2002 census); 3,605 (1989 Soviet census).

== History ==
Bely Gorodok was first mentioned in the end of the 14th century (1366 and 1375 are commonly cited). At the time, it belonged to Principality of Tver, and later, together with the principality, was annexed by the Grand Duchy of Moscow. In the 18th century, it was included into the Moscow Governorate. In 1775 it was then transferred to the newly established Tver Viceroyalty and became a part of Kalyazinsky Uyezd. In 1796, the Viceroyalty was abolished and transformed into the Tver Governorate. On December 30, 1918, Kimrsky Uyezd, with its center in Kimry, was established, and Bely Gorodok was included into Kimrsky Uyezd.

On 12 August 1929, the Tver Governorate was abolished, and the area was transferred to Moscow Oblast. Uyezds were abolished as well, and Kimrsky District, with the administrative center in Kimry, was established within Kimry Okrug of Moscow Oblast. Bely Gorodok was a part of Kimrsky District. On July 23, 1930, the okrugs were abolished, and the districts were directly subordinated to the oblast. On January 29, 1935 Kalinin Oblast was established, and Kimrsky District was transferred to Kalinin Oblast. In 1951, the selo of Bely Gorodok was granted urban-settlement status. In 1990, Kalinin Oblast was renamed Tver Oblast.

== Economy ==
=== Industry ===
There is a shipyard in Bely Gorodok. There are also companies carrying out hydrotechnical engineering works and producing textile bags.

=== Transportation ===
There is a railway station at Bely Gorodok on the railway connecting Kimry and Kalyazin, with infrequent passenger traffic: suburban as well as long-distant.

Bely Gorodok has access to the paved road connecting Kimry and Taldom. There are bus connections with Kimry.

== Culture and recreation ==
There is one cultural heritage monument of local significance in Bely Gorodok: the Church of Entry to Jerusalem built in 1825.
