= Boris Kapitonovich Alexandrov =

- Born: Boris Kapitonovich Alexandrov; Борис Капитонович Александров; 18 August 1889; Vladikavkaz, Russian Empire
- Died: 22 January 1973 (aged 83); Moscow, USSR
- Occupation: hydraulic engineer

Boris Kapitonovich Alexandrov (Russian: Борис Капитонович Александров; 18 August 1889, Vladikavkaz — 22 January 1973, Moscow) was a Russian hydraulic engineer, professor.

== Biography ==
Boris Kapitonovich Alexandrov was born on 18 August 1889 in Vladikavkaz. In 1917 he graduated from Petrograd Polytechnic Institute. Since 1918 he taught at deffirent Soviet universities. Since 1946 he had been working at the Moscow Power Engineering Institute (since 1948 he was a professor).

Alexandrov was one of the authors of the projects of Moscow Canal, Rybinsk and Uglich Hydroelectric Stations. He was also the author of the project of Kama Hydroelectric Station and Kama multi-chamber navigable locks with electric traction.

His main works scientific works are dedicated to the energy use of plain rivers (the Volga along with its tributaries) and the rotation of the northern rivers (Pechora and Onega) into the Caspian Sea. He also did research about possibilities of designs of hydropower facilities.

Boris Kapitonovich Alexandrov was a Corresponding Member of the USSR Academy of Sciences. He was also awarded with the Order of Lenin and the Order of the Badge of Honour and various medals.

He died on 22 January 1973 in Moscow.
