= Kimrsky District =

Kimrsky District Кимрский район (Russian)
- District
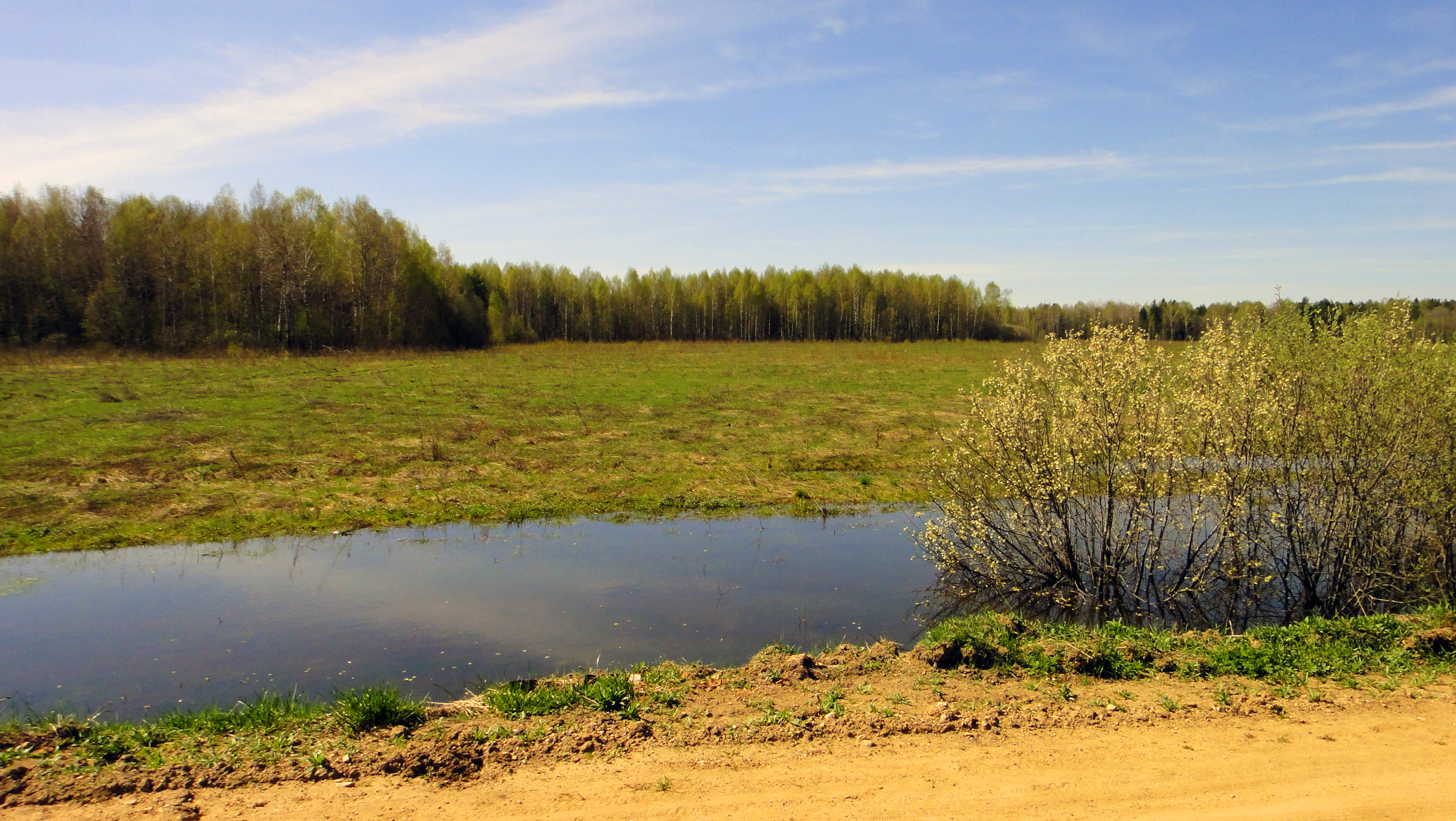
- Landscape in Kimrsky District

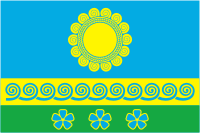
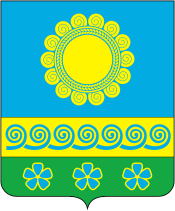
- Flag Coat of arms
- Location of Kimrsky District in Tver Oblast
- Coordinates: 56°52′N 37°21′E
- Country: Russia
- Federal subject: Tver Oblast
- Established: 12 July 1929
- Administrative center: Kimry

Area
  - Total: 2,514 km^{2} (971 sq mi)

Population (2010 Census)
  - Total: 13,190
  - Density: 5.247/km^{2} (13.59/sq mi)
  - Urban: 18.4%
  - Rural: 81.6%

Administrative structure
  - Administrative divisions: 13 rural settlement
  - Inhabited localities: 1 urban-type settlements, 417 rural localities

Municipal structure
  - Municipally incorporated as: Kimrsky Municipal District
  - Municipal divisions: 1 urban settlements, 13 rural settlements
- Website: http://kimryadm.ru/

Kimrsky District (Russian: Ки́мрский райо́н) is an administrative and municipal district (raion), one of the thirty-six in Tver Oblast, Russia. It is located in the southeast of the oblast and borders with Kalyazinsky District in the northeast, Taldomsky District of Moscow Oblast and the town of Dubna, also of Moscow Oblast, in the south, Konakovsky District in the southwest, Kalininsky District in the west, and with Rameshkovsky District in the northwest. The area of the district is 2,514 square kilometers (971 sq mi). Its administrative center is the town of Kimry (which is not administratively a part of the district). Population: 13,190 (2010 Census); 15,604 (2002 census); 18,439 (1989 Soviet census).

== Geography ==
The whole area of the district belongs to the drainage basin of the Volga. The Volga, built as the Uglich Reservoir, crosses the district from the southwest to the northeast, separating it into two unequal parts. The rivers in the northern, bigger part of the district drains into the Volga directly or to the Medveditsa River, a major left tributary of the Volga. The lower course of the Medveditsa lies within the district. The main tributaries of the Medveditsa in the district are the Rudomosh River, the Bolshaya Puditsa River, and the Malaya Puditsa River (all from the right). The two main right tributaries of the Volga within the district are the Khotcha River and the Dubna River, which makes a stretch of a border of a district with Moscow Region.

== History ==
In the 18th century, the area was included into Moscow Governorate. In 1775 it was transferred to newly established Tver Viceroyalty, where it was split between Korchevskoy (established in 1781) and Kalyazinsky Uyezds. In 1796, the Viceroyalty was abolished and transformed into Tver Governorate. On December 30, 1918 Kimrsky Uyezd with the center in Kimry was established on the lands which previously belonged to Korchevskoy and Kalyazinsky Uyezds. On May 30, 1922 Korchevskoy Uyezd was abolished and merged into Kimrsky Uyezd. On October 3, 1927 Kashinsky Uyezd was abolished and split between Kimrsky and Bezhetsky Uyezds.

On July 12, 1929, Tver Governorate was abolished, and the area was transferred to Moscow Oblast. Uyezds were abolished as well, and Kimrsky District, with the administrative center in Kimry, was established within Kimry Okrug of Moscow Oblast. On July 23, 1930, the okrugs were abolished, and the districts were directly subordinated to the oblast. On January 29, 1935 Kalinin Oblast was established, and Kimrsky District was transferred to Kalinin Oblast. On February 13, 1963, during the abortive Khrushchyov administrative reform, Kalyazinsky District was merged into Kimrsky District, but on March 4, 1964 it was re-established. In 1990, Kalinin Oblast was renamed Tver Oblast.

In 1951, the selo of Bely Gorodok was granted urban-settlement status. In July 1956, the urban-type settlement of Dubna, which belonged to Kimrsky District, was granted the town status. In September 1956, Dubna was transferred to Moscow Oblast.

== Administrative and municipal status ==
Within the framework of administrative divisions, Kimrsky District is one of the thirty-six in the oblast. The town of Kimry serves as its administrative center, despite being incorporated separately as an okrug—an administrative unit with the status equal to that of the districts.

As a municipal division, the district is incorporated as Kimrsky Municipal District. Kimry Okrug is incorporated separately from the district as Kimry Urban Okrug.

== Economy ==
=== Industry ===
There is a shipyard in the settlement of Bely Gorodok. There are also enterprises in the district engaged in peat and timber production.

=== Agriculture ===
The main agricultural specialization of the district is cattle breeding with meat and milk production.

=== Transportation ===
A railway connecting Moscow with Kashin and further with Sonkovo and Saint-Petersburg crosses the eastern part of the district. There is a regular suburban passenger traffic between Moscow and Savyolovo, and a regular infrequent traffic between Savyolovo and Kashin.

Paved roads connect Kimry with Tver, Taldom, Kashin, and Kalyazin. All of them cross the district. There are also local roads, with bus traffic originating from Kimry.

The Volga is navigable, but there is no passenger navigation.

== Culture and recreation ==
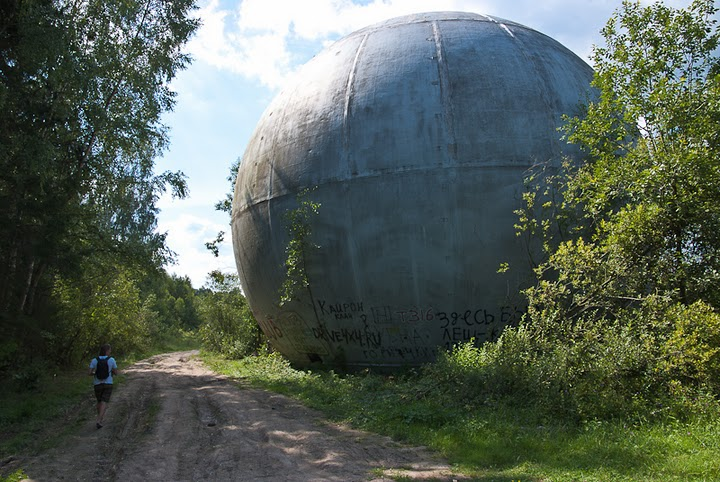
A 18-meter sphere of unknown origin close to the village of Ignatovo.

The district contains eight cultural heritage monuments of federal significance and additionally thirty-six objects classified as cultural and historical heritage of local significance. The federal monuments include the Resurrection Church in the village of Stoyantsy, the Saint Nicholas Church in the village of Nikolo-Neveryevo, as well as a number of archeological sites.
