= Cherkovo =

Cherkovo (Russian: Черково) is the name of several rural localities in Russia.

- Cherkovo, Tver Oblast, a village in Nerlskoye Rural Settlement of Kalyazinsky District in Tver Oblast
- Cherkovo, Vologda Oblast, a village in Gulinsky Selsoviet of Belozersky District in Vologda Oblast
