= Nerl River =

Nerl River may refer to:

- Nerl River (Klyazma), a river in the Yaroslavl, Ivanovo, and Vladimir Oblasts, tributary of the Klyazma
- Nerl River (Volga), a river in the Yaroslavl and Tver Oblasts, tributary of the Volga
