= Kalyazinsky District =

Kalyazinsky District Калязинский район (Russian)
- District
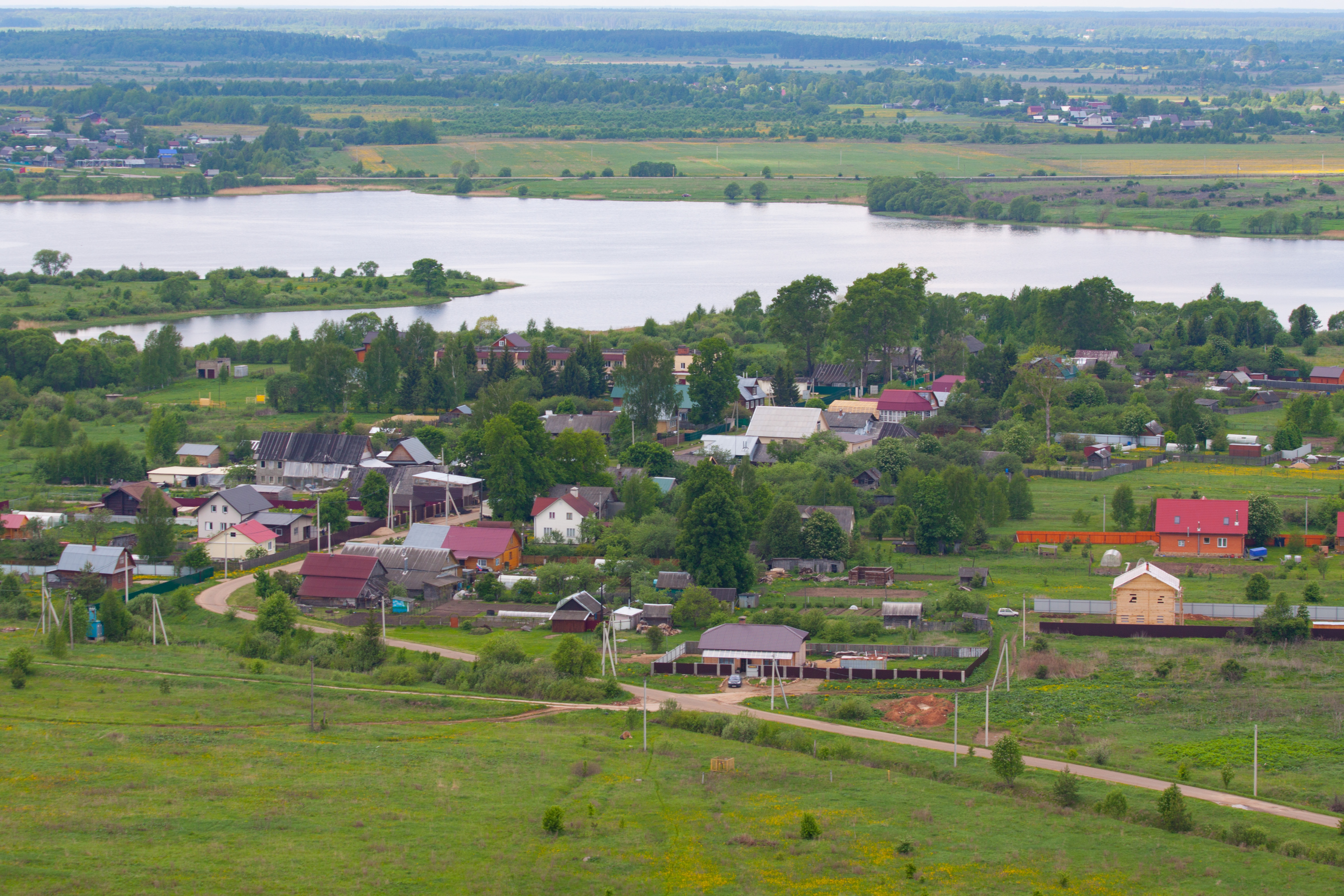
- Village in Kalyazinsky District

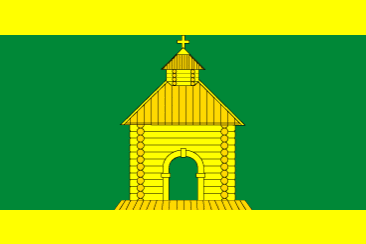
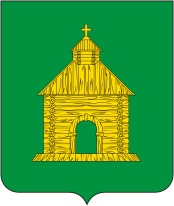
- Flag Coat of arms
- Location of Kalyazinsky District in Tver Oblast
- Coordinates: 57°14′N 37°51′E
- Country: Russia
- Federal subject: Tver Oblast
- Established: 12 July 1929
- Administrative center: Kalyazin

Area
  - Total: 1,671 km^{2} (645 sq mi)

Population (2010 Census)
  - Total: 21,688
  - Density: 12.98/km^{2} (33.62/sq mi)
  - Urban: 63.9%
  - Rural: 36.1%

Administrative structure
  - Administrative divisions: 1 Urban settlements, 4 Rural settlements
  - Inhabited localities: 1 cities/towns, 330 rural localities

Municipal structure
  - Municipally incorporated as: Kalyazinsky Municipal District
  - Municipal divisions: 1 urban settlements, 4 rural settlements
- Time zone: UTC+3 (MSK)
- OKTMO ID: 28622000
- Website: http://калязин1775.рф/

Kalyazinsky District (Russian: Каля́зинский райо́н) is an administrative and municipal district (raion), one of the thirty-six in Tver Oblast, Russia. It is located in the southeast of the oblast and borders with Uglichsky District of Yaroslavl Oblast in the northeast, Pereslavsky District of Yaroslavl Oblast in the southeast, Sergiyevo-Posadsky District of Moscow Oblast in the south, Taldomsky District, also of Moscow Oblast, in the southwest, Kimrsky District in the west, and with Kashinsky District in the northwest. The area of the district is 1,671 square kilometers (645 sq mi). Its administrative center is the town of Kalyazin. Population: 21,688 (2010 Census); 24,460 (2002 census); 27,341 (1989 Soviet census). The population of Kalyazin accounts for 63.9% of the district's total population.

== Geography ==
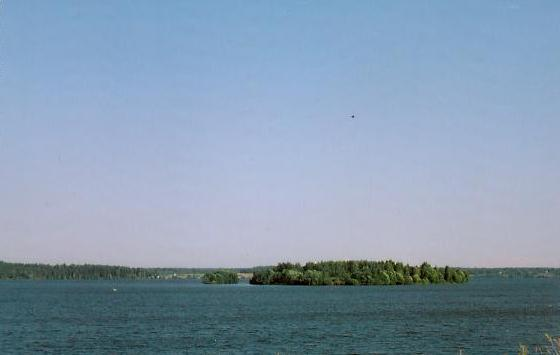
The island in the Uglich Reservoir where the Makaryev Monastery was previously located.

The Volga River (built as the Uglich Reservoir) makes the western border of the district, and the whole area of Kalyazinsky District is flat and belongs to the drainage basins of the right tributaries of the Volga. The central and the southern parts of the district belong to the basin of the Nerl River, whereas the rivers in the northern part mainly drain into the Zhabnya River. The town of Kalyazin is located at the mouth of the Zhabnya.

== History ==
In 1134, Yuri Dolgorukiy, the Prince of Moscow, founded the fortress of Ksnyatin in the mouth of the Nerl. In the end of the 12th century, the village of Nikola-na-Zhabne was founded at the mouth of the Zhabnya, where Kalyazin is currently located. In the 15th century, the Makaryev Monastery (later the Trinity Kalyazin Monastery) was founded on the left bank of the Volga across Kalyazin. By the time, Kalyazin belonged to the Grand Duchy of Moscow. In the beginning of the 17th century, during the Time of Troubles, Kalyazin was twice plundered by Polish-Lithuanian troops.

In the 18th century, the area was included into Moscow Governorate. In 1775, Kalyazin was granted town rights, and Kalyazinsky Uyezd was established. It was a part of newly established Tver Viceroyalty. In 1796, the Viceroyalty was abolished and transformed into Tver Governorate. Kalyazinsky Uyezd was abolished, but in

1803, it was re-established. On May 30, 1922 Kalyazinsky Uyezd was abolished and merged into Kashinsky Uyezd. On October 3, 1927 Kashinsky Uyezd was abolished and split between Bezhetsky and Kimrsky Uyezds.

On 12 August 1929, Tver Governorate was abolished, and the area was transferred to Moscow Oblast. Uyezds were abolished as well, and Kalyazinsky District, with the administrative center in Kalyazin, was established within Kimry Okrug of Moscow Oblast. On July 23, 1930, the okrugs were abolished, and the districts were directly subordinated to the oblast. On January 29, 1935 Kalinin Oblast was established, and Kalyazinsky District was transferred to Kalinin Oblast. On February 13, 1963, during the abortive Khrushchyov administrative reform, Kalyazinsky District was merged into Kimrsky District, but on March 4, 1964 it was re-established. In 1990, Kalinin Oblast was renamed Tver Oblast.

In the 1930s, during the construction of the Uglich Reservoir, the historic part of Kalyazin, including the Makaryev Monastery, was submerged under water.

On July 12, 1929 Nerlsky District with the administrative center in the selo of Nerl was created as well. It was a part of Kimry Okrug of Moscow Oblast. On July 1, 1936 it was transferred to Kalinin Oblast. On July 4, 1956 the district was abolished and merged into Kalyazinsky District.

== Economy ==
=== Industry ===
Two factories in Kalyazin one producing oil extraction equipment and another one manufacturing some parts of MiG airplanes, are responsible for 42% of the total industrial production of the district. Chemical, food, leather, and textile industry are present as well.

=== Agriculture ===
The main agricultural specializations of the district are cattle breeding with meat and milk production, as well as flax growing. As of 2014, there were 25 large- and mid-size farms in the district.

=== Transportation ===
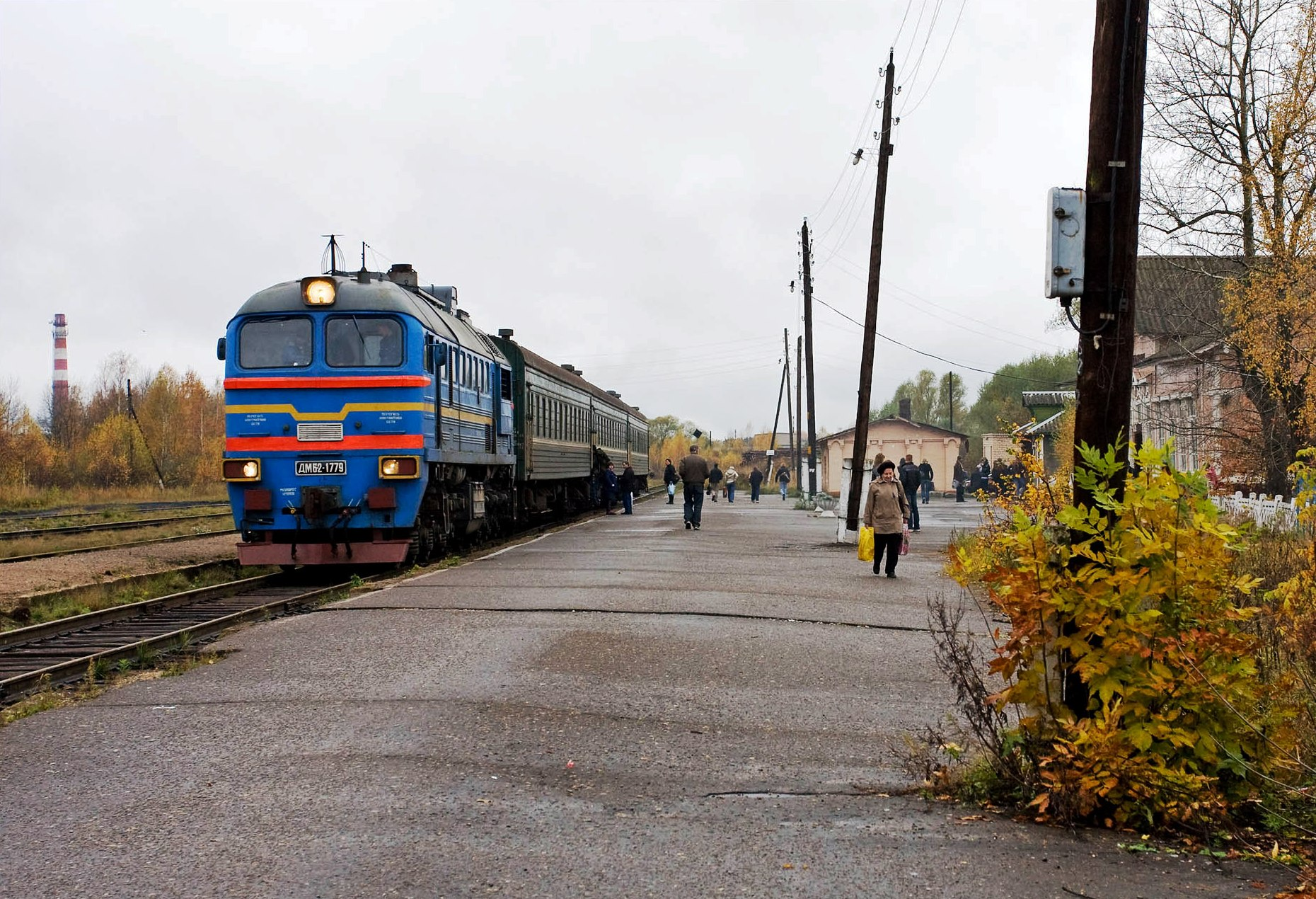
Kalyazin railway station

The railway connecting Moscow via Kimry with Uglich crosses the district from west to east and runs through Kalyazin. There is infrequent passenger traffic.

Kalyazin is connected by roads with Sergiyev Posad, Uglich, and Tver and Kimry via Kashin. There are local roads as well. There is bus traffic originating from Kalyazin.

The Volga is navigable, however, there is no passenger navigation.

== Culture and recreation ==
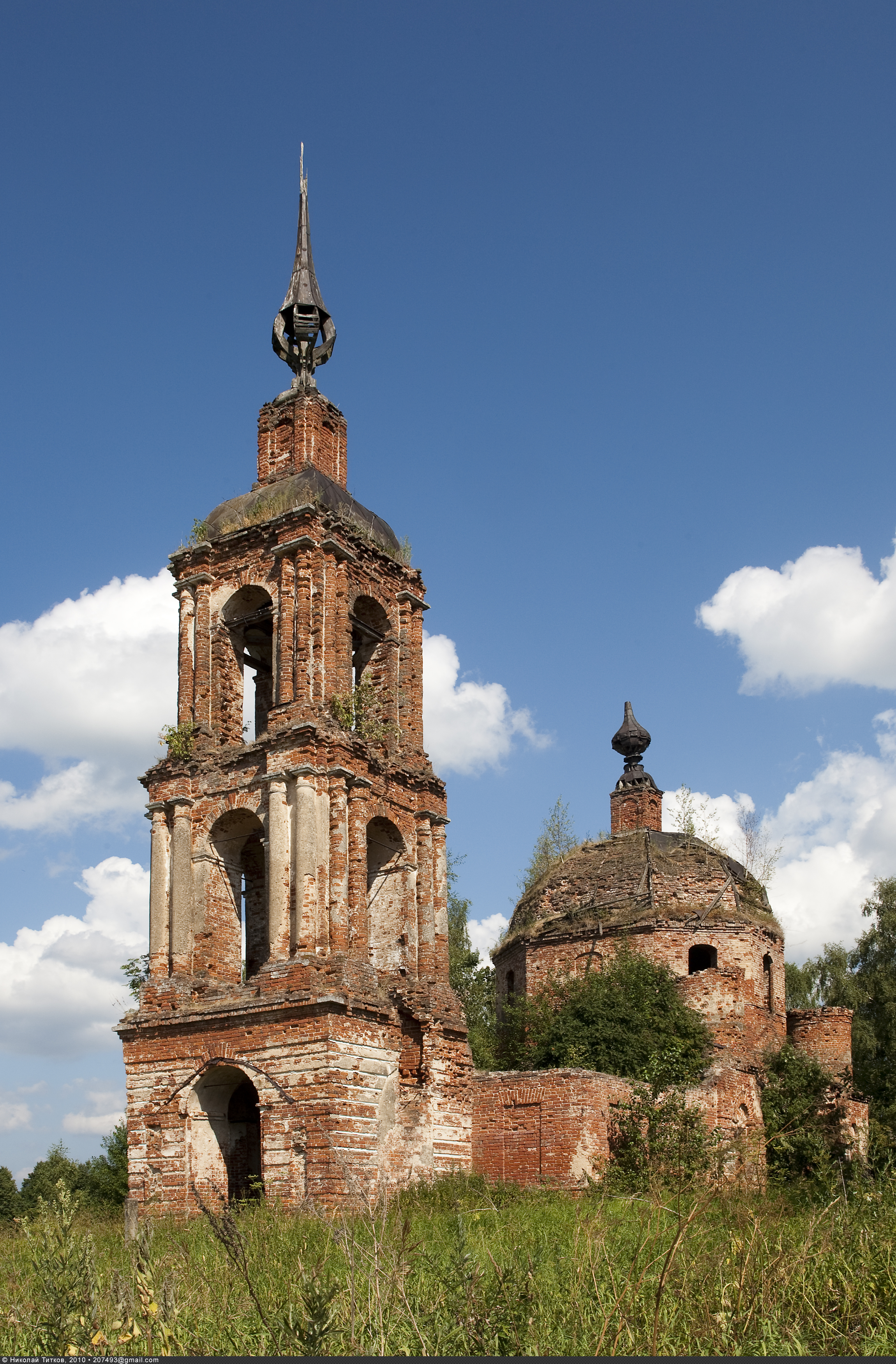
The Church of the Nativity of the Theotokos in the selo of Gora Pnevits.

The district contains twenty-eight cultural heritage monuments of federal significance (sixteen of them located in Kalyazin) and additionally forty-two objects classified as cultural and historical heritage of local significance (twenty-two of them in Kalyazin). The district landmark is the Kalyazin Bell Tower, submerged by the Uglich Reservoir and located only partially above the water level. Other federal monuments include the ensemble of administrative buildings and living houses in the center of Kalyazin, the Ascencion and the Epiphany Churches in Kalyazin, the Epiphany Church in the village of Semendyayevo, and the estates of Kalabriyevo and Rylovo, as well as an archeological site.

The Kalyazin District Museum is located in Kalyazin.
