= Medveditsa (Volga) =

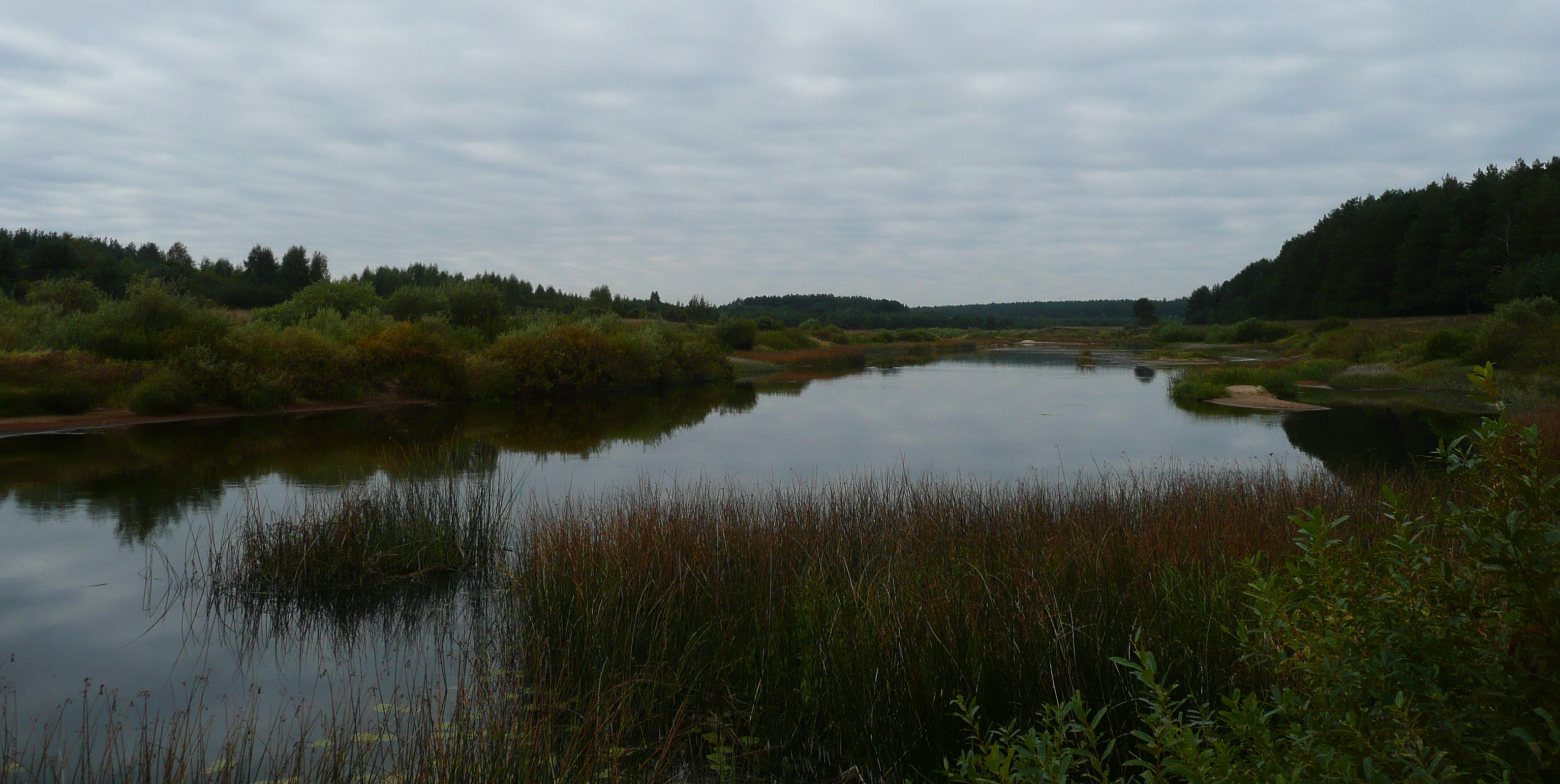

Location
- Country: Russia

Physical characteristics
- Source
  - location: Tver Oblast
  - elevation: 219 m (719 ft)
- Mouth: Volga
  - coordinates: 57°04′28″N 37°30′25″E
- Length: 259 km (161 mi)
- Basin size: 5,570 km^{2} (2,150 sq mi)
- Discharge
  - average: 41 m^{3}/s (1,400 cu ft/s)

Basin features
- Progression: Volga→ Caspian Sea

The Medveditsa (Russian: Медве́дица) is a river in Spirovsky, Likhoslavlsky, Rameshkovsky, Kashinsky, and Kimrsky Districts of Tver Oblast, Russia, a left tributary of the Volga (joining the Volga at the Uglich Reservoir). The main tributaries are the Kushalka (left), the Ivitsa (right), the Drezna (left), the Rudomosh (left), and the Yakhroma (right). The length of the Medveditsa is 259 kilometres (161 mi), and the area of its drainage basin is 5,570 square kilometres (2,150 mi^{2}).

The source of the Medveditsa is southwest of the village of Gorma in Spirovsky District, at the southeastern outskirts of the Valdai Hills. The river flows southeast, and makes a stretch of the border between Spirovsky and Likhoslavlsky Districts. It crosses Likhoslavlsky District, enters Rameshkovsky District, and south of Rameshki turns east. The Medveditsa reaches the border with Kimrsky District and turns northeast, making the border between Rameshkovsky and Kimrsky Districts, and then east, making the border between Kashinsky and Kimrsky Districts. It enters Kashinsky District, returns to the border, and crosses into Kimrsky District. The mouth of the Medveditsa is downstream of the selo of Pleshkovo.

The drainage basin of the Medveditsa include the central parts of Spirovsky and Likhoslavlsky Districts, almost the whole area of Rameshkovsky District, the northwest of Kimrsky District, the west of Kashinsky District, as well as minor areas in Bezhetsky and Kesovogorsky Districts. The urban-type settlement of Rameshki lies in the drainage basin of the Medveditsa.

Medveditsa is popular for tourism and recreation.
