= Uglich Hydroelectric Station =

Coordinates: 57.5275°N 38.297778°E

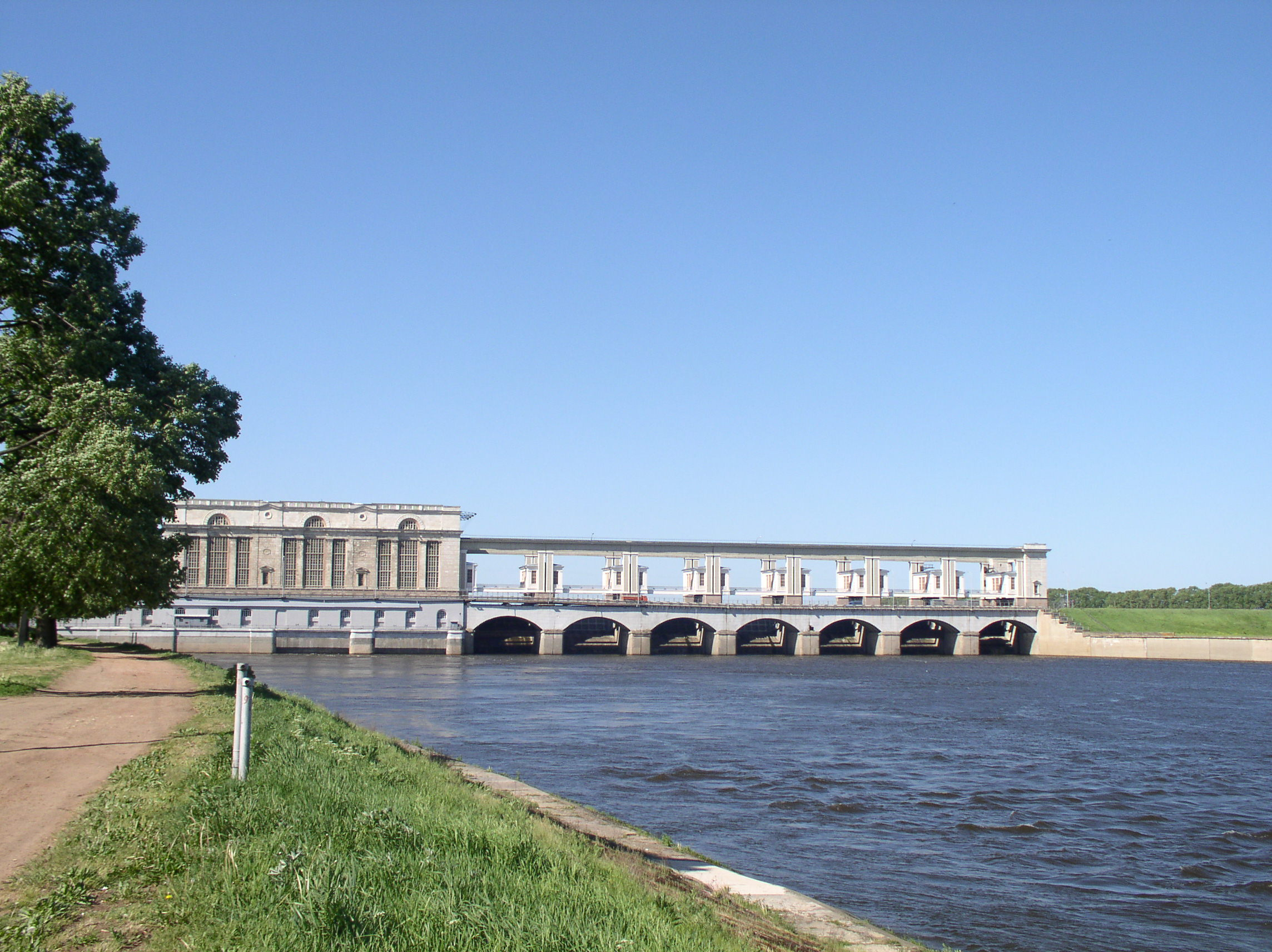
- Interactive map of Uglich Hydroelectric Station
- Country: Russia
- Status: Operational
- Construction began: 1935
- Opening date: 1940

The Uglich Hydroelectric Station or Uglich GES (Russian: Угличская ГЭС) is a hydroelectric station on the Volga River in Uglich in Yaroslavl Oblast, Russia, and is the first of the Volga-Kama cascade of dams. It began operating on December 8, 1940, making it one of the oldest hydroelectric plants in Russia. The 120-MW plant is operated by RusHydro. There is also a Russian hydropower museum located at the hydroelectric plant dedicated to the development of hydropower.

== History ==
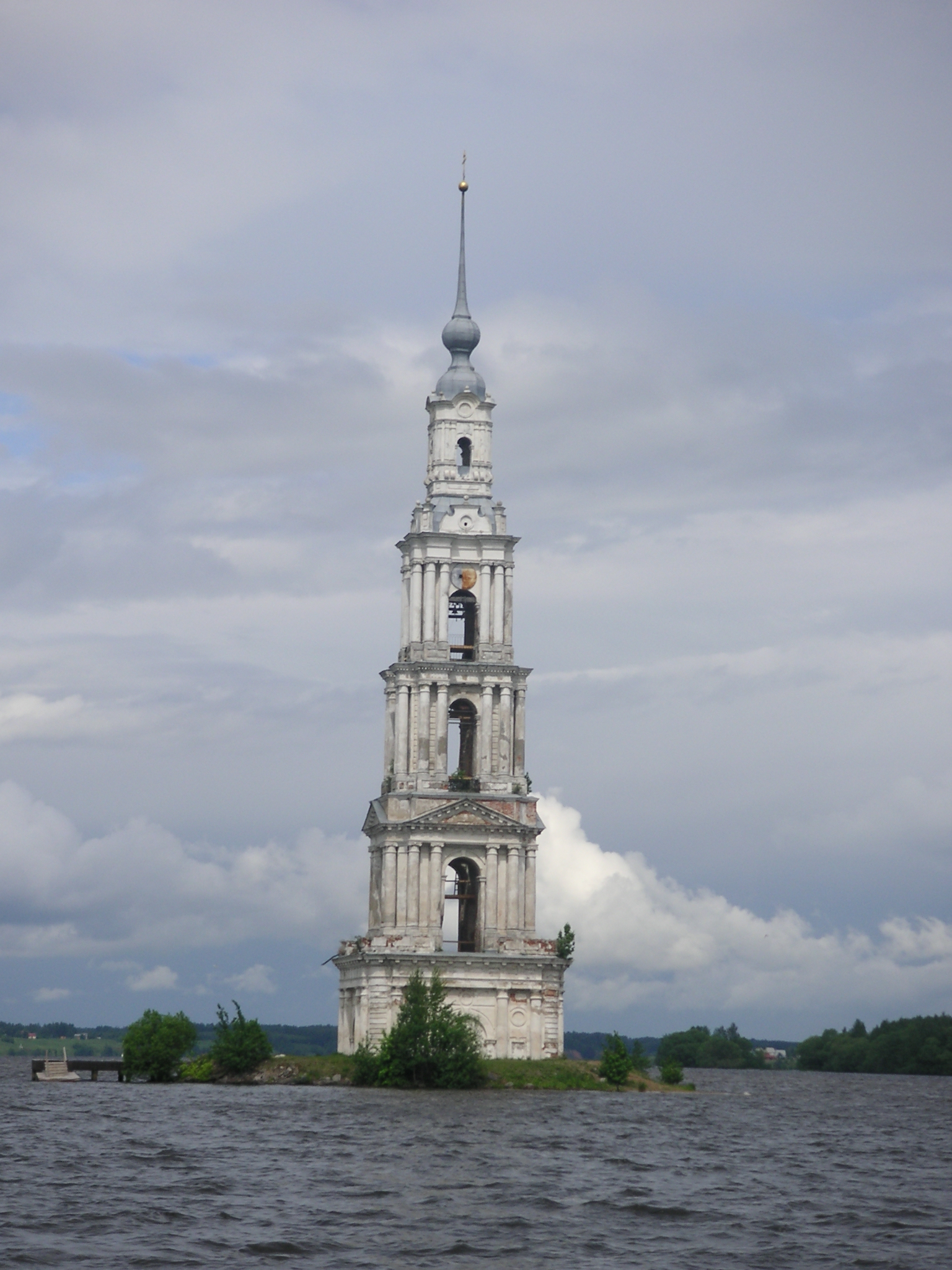
The Flooded Belfry in Kalyazin

Plant construction began in 1935 and the first excavator arrived in January 1936. The plant's design was approved on May 23, 1938 by the Economic Council of the USSR Council of People's Commissars, modeled after the Rybinsk hydroelectric station. Gulag prisoners were used in the construction. Many villages and the old part of Kalyazin were flooded by the reservoir created by the dam. Some of the oldest buildings in the region, including the 15th-century Intercession Monastery in Uglich and the 16th-century Trinity Monastery in Kalyazin, were submerged by the reservoir.

The first hydroelectric generator went into operation on December 8, 1940, and the second began operating on March 20, 1941.

== Upgrades ==
In 2007 Voith Hydro acquired a contract to replace the second hydroelectric generator at the plant, after almost 70 years of operation. The generator's operation had fallen from an initial 55 MW to 35 MW after years of deterioration. The estimated cost of the replacement was 34 million euros. The new generator was finished in 2011 and RusHydro began modernizing the plant's first generator in June 2011, with plans to complete the equipment replacement by 2020.

In 2024 a new rotor of the hydraulic unit was installed, replacing the one that was installed in 1940.
