= Rybinsk Hydroelectric Station =

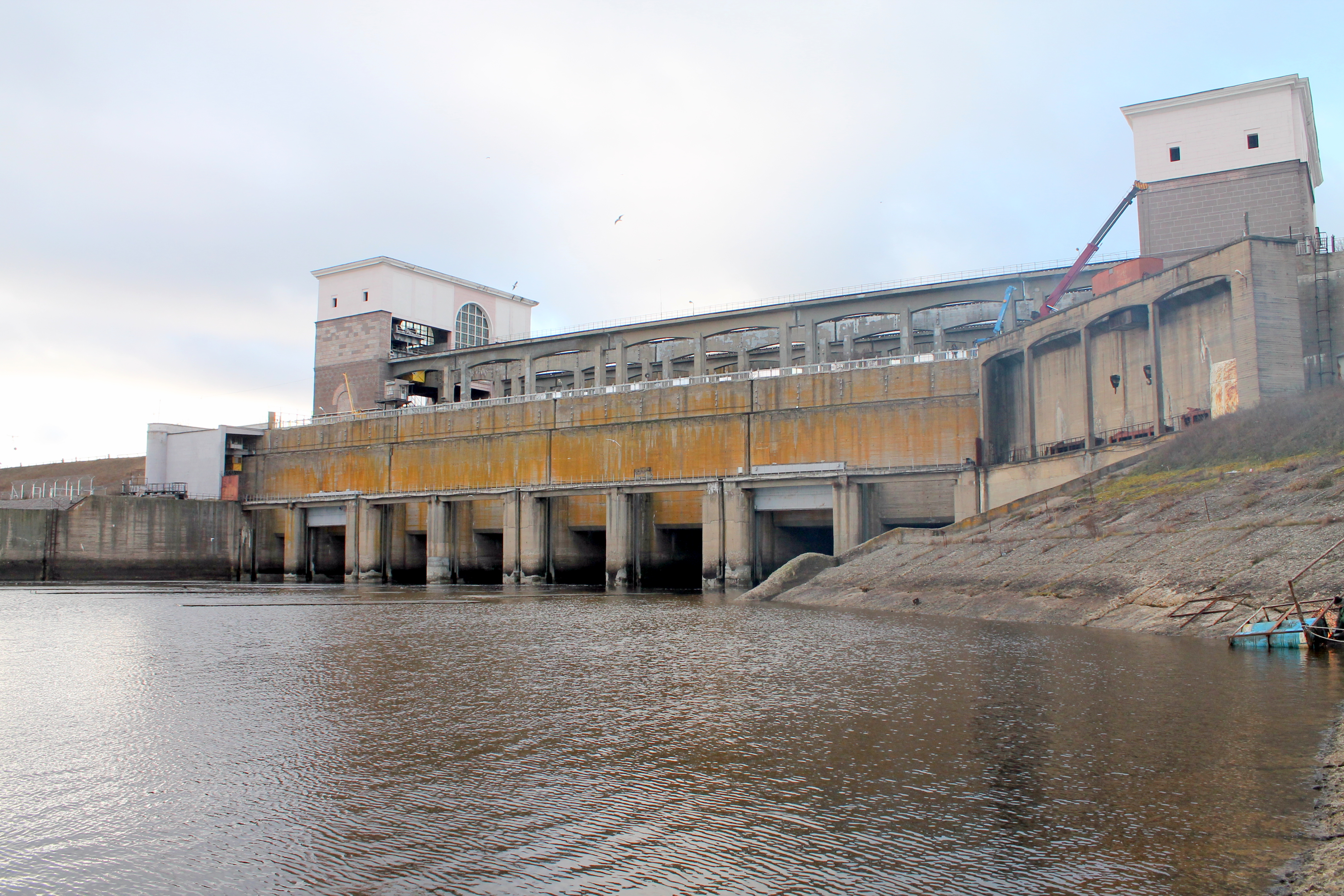
- Country: Russia; Soviet Union
- Coordinates: 58°04′56″N 38°49′30″E
- Owner: RusHydro
- Operator: RusHydro

Power generation
- Nameplate capacity: 386.4 MW

External links
- Commons: Related media on Commons

Rybinsk Hydroelectric Station or Rybinsk GES (Russian: Рыбинская ГЭС) is a hydroelectric station on the Volga and the Sheksna rivers in Yaroslavl Oblast near the Rybinsk town. It is the third of the Volga-Kama Cascade of dams.

== General data ==
Construction began in 1935 and was completed in 1950.

The complex consists of

- Concrete spillway dam on the Volga river,
- Earth-fill dam on the Volga river, 524 m long and 27 m high
- Single-lane, single-chamber lock on the Volga river
- Earth-fill dam on the Sheksna river, 470 m long and 35 m high
- Left-bank and right-bank dams on the Sheksna river, with total length of 6035 m.
- Powerhouse on Sheksna river.

Installed power is 386.4 MW, average annual production is 935 GWh. Power house has 6 generators with Kaplan turbines, working at 13.4 m head: 2 of 63.2 MW each and 4 of 65 MW. The dam forms Rybinsk Reservoir. A highway passes over the Volga river on the dam.

== Usage ==
The station covers peaks of electricity demand of central Russia. The reservoir is used for annual discharge regulation, boosting energy production on lower hydroelectric stations on the Volga. The reservoir is used for navigation ( it is the lowest stage of Volga–Baltic Waterway ) and flood control.

== History ==
Initially the project of a dam in upper Volga considered a dam at 14 km up from Yaroslavl with much less flood area, and preparations had been started. Later the project was reconsidered and the present site chosen. The Mologa town was flooded.

Timeline:

- May 23, 1938 – the project was approved.
- June 1940 – construction has been started.
- June 24, 1940 – the Volga dam completed.
- October 24, 1940 – the Sheksna dam completed.
- April 13, 1941 – reservoir started to fill.
- November 18, 1941 – first turbine unit was put under load.
- August 15, 1942 – second turbine unit was put under load.
- August 1945 – December 1950 – the remaining 4 units were launched.

Construction was supervised by NKVD and forced labour was extensively used. First turbines were started during the most difficult period of World War II, while thermal power plants suffered from lack of fuel. The station building was incomplete at that moment, and worked under tarp tent as a roof. Construction was continued after the war, and July 30, 1955 Uglich Hydroelectric Station and Rybinsk hydroelectric stations were officially completed and formed "1st cascade of Mosenergo hydroelectric stations". At that moment station's installed power was 330 MW, it was second-biggest power producer in USSR, after DneproGES.

From 1998 to 2022 all generator units were replaced, increasing installed power by 56,4 MW.

There are also plans of installing 2 new generating units, increasing installed power up to 505.6 MW.
