= Kubr =

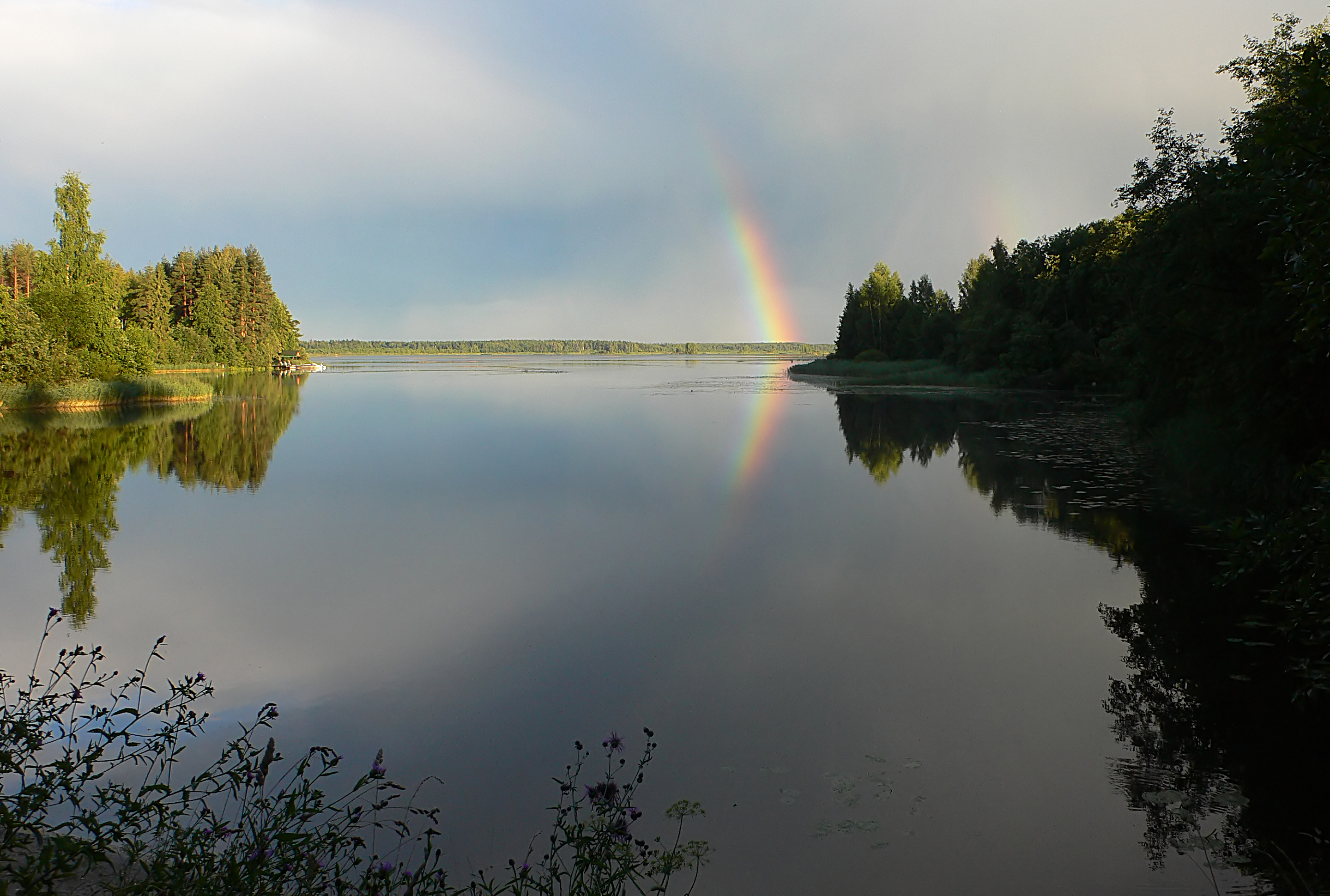
- Native name: Кубрь (Russian)

Location
- Country: Russia

Physical characteristics
- Mouth: Nerl
  - coordinates: 56.8583°N 38.2844°E
- Length: 91 km (57 mi)
- Basin size: 1,010 km^{2} (390 sq mi)

Basin features
- Progression: Nerl→ Volga→ Caspian Sea

The Kubr or Kubrya (Russian: Кубрь, Кубря) is a river in the Yaroslavl Oblast of Russia. It rises in the Lyakhovo marshes and flows from the left into the Nerl, a right tributary of the Volga. It is 91 kilometres (57 mi) long, and has a drainage basin of 1,010 square kilometres (390 sq mi). The township of Kubrinsk takes its name from the river.
