= Andrey Dostoevsky =

Andrey Dostoyevsky
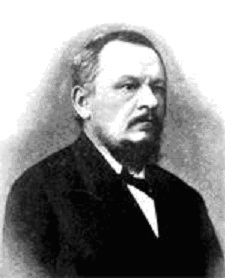
- Born: March 27, 1825
- Died: March 19, 1897 (aged 71); Saint Petersburg
- Education: Saint-Petersburg State University of Architecture and Civil Engineering
- Occupation: Architect

Andrey Mikhailovich Dostoyevsky (Russian: Андрей Михайлович Достоевский; March 27, 1825 – March 19, 1897) was a Russian architect, engineer, memoirist, and building restorer. He was also the father of renowned histologist Alexander Dostoyevsky and the brother of famous writer Fyodor Dostoyevsky. While not as close to Fyodor as their elder brother Mikhail, Andrey and Fydor maintained a friendly relationship throughout their lives, even corresponding regularly.

Andrey Dostoyevsky's Memoirs (Russian: Воспоминания, Vospominania), first published in 1930, discuss the early years of Fyodor Dostoyevsky's life. Covering the period from 1825 to 1871, the Memoirs were written in eight months between 1895 and 1896.

== Career ==
In late 1841, Andrey Dostoyevsky moved to Saint Petersburg. The following year, he entered the Saint-Petersburg State University of Architecture and Civil Engineering, graduating in June 1848. Subsequently, he worked as an engineer in Saint Petersburg. He had none of the literary talent of his brothers Fyodor and Mikhail. In 1849 Andrey was arrested as a member of Petrashevsky Circle and placed in Peter and Paul Fortress, because he was mistaken for Mikhail. 13 days later, Andrey was released, but this incident ruined his career. Because of the relations to Dostoyevsky family, he was sent out of Saint Petersburg and appointed as head architect in Elisavetgrad. In July 1850 Andrey Dostoyevsky married Domnika Fedorchenko. They had 2 sons and 2 daughters.

Andrey Dostoyevsky worked as an architect in Elisavetgrad, Simferopol, Dnipropetrovsk. In 1865, he was appointed at Yaroslavl guberniya, where he served on various positions for more than twenty-five years. Widowed in 1887, after his retirement in 1890 he lived alone. In 1897, he died of cancer.

== Projects ==
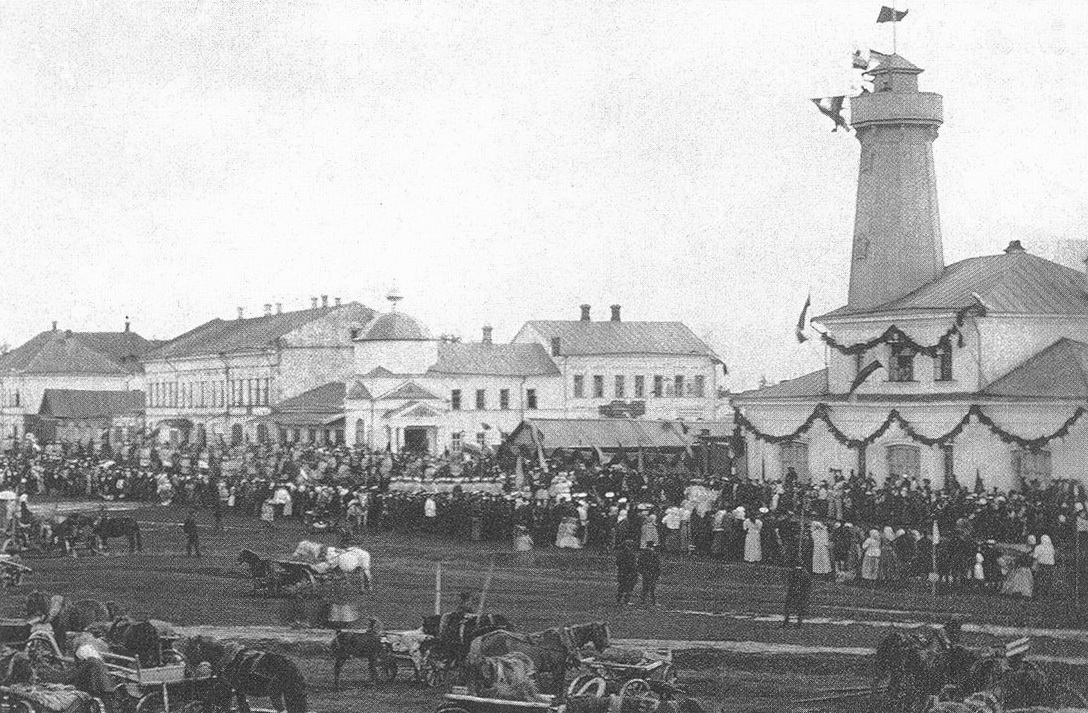
A fire lookout tower in Mologa (on the right) designed by Andrey Dostoyevsky.

- 1867 — approved as an architect of the bell tower near the Annunciation church in Yaroslavl; observed the church expanding in Uglich district; designed a fire lookout tower in the town of Mologa.
- 1867—1869 — supervised a church reconstruction in Krasnov village (Rostov uyezd).
- 1880 — a match factory project for merchant Dunaev (Yaroslavl).
- 1882 — chemical factory design near Romanov-Borisoglebsk; iron factory design in Yaroslavl.
- 1882 — reconstruction project of the stone chapel in Malo-Bogorodskoye village (Myshkin uyezd).
- 1883 — approved a draft project of the bleaching facility near Stepanovo village on Kotorosl River.
- 1886 — a project of Nativity of the Theotokos church in Breytovo village (Mologa uyezd).
- 1887 — a stone bell tower project for a church in Dmitrovskoye village (Poshekh uyezd).
- 1888 — a new bell tower project of the Dormition of the Theotokos church in Zakobyakino village (Lyubim uyezd); a weaving factory project near Nagatino village.
- 1890 — a project of five-storey steam mill in Poshekhonye.

== See also ==
Media related to Andrey Dostoyevsky at Wikimedia Commons
