= Nerl (Volga) =

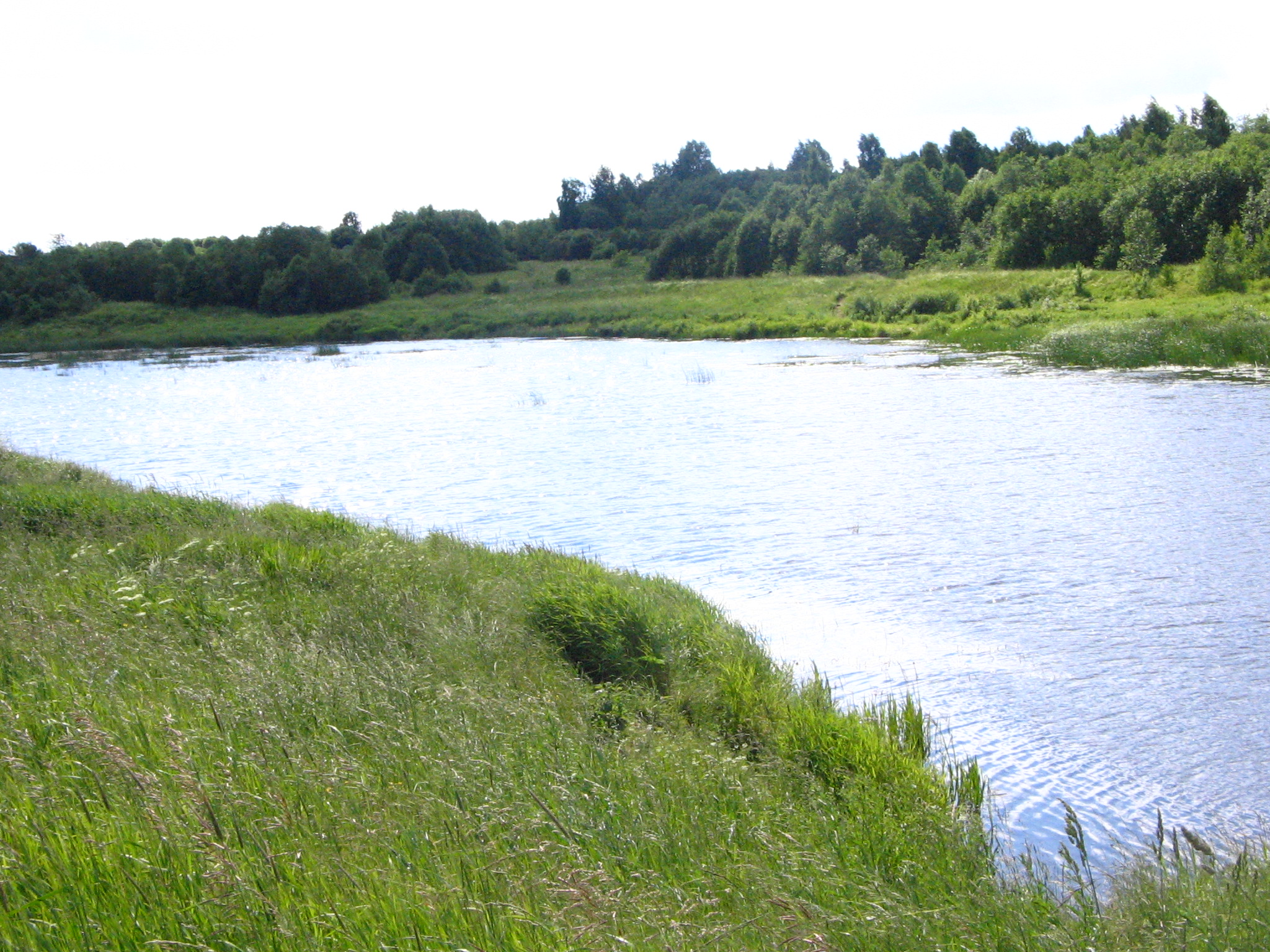
- The Nerl by the village of Yelpatyevo

Location
- Country: Russia

Physical characteristics
- Source
  - location: Lake Pleshcheyevo
- Mouth: Volga
  - location: Uglich Reservoir
  - coordinates: 57°6′34.6818″N 37°40′2.9562″E
- Length: 112 km (70 mi)
- Basin size: 3,270 km^{2} (1,260 sq mi)

Basin features
- Progression: Volga→ Caspian Sea

The Nerl (Russian: Нерль) is a river in Pereslavsky District of Yaroslavl and Kalyazinsky District of Tver Oblast in Russia, a right tributary of the Volga (at the Uglich Reservoir). The length of the river is 112 kilometres (70 mi). The area of its drainage basin is 3,270 square kilometres (1,260 sq mi). Its main tributary is the 91 km (57 mi) long Kubr (left), which rises in the Lyakhovo marshes.

The Nerl originates in the Lake Pleshcheyevo under the name of Veksa-Pleshcheyevskaya, flows northwest and is known as the Nerl downstream of Lake Somino. Downstream of the village of Andrianovo a stretch of the Nerl makes the border between Yaroslavl and Tver Oblasts. Further downstream, the Nerl enters Tver Oblast. Its mouth is in the village of Sknyatino.

The drainage basin of the Nerl includes the western and the central parts of Pereslavsky District, the southern part of Kalyazinsky District, as well as relatively minor areas in the southern part of Uglichsky District of Yaroslavl Oblast, and northern parts of Alexandrovsky District of Vladimir Oblast and Taldomsky and Sergiyevo-Posadsky Districts of Moscow Oblast. The town of Pereslavl-Zalessky and the urban-type settlement of Kubrinsk lie in the drainage basin of the Nerl.
