= Kalyazinsky Uyezd =

Kalyazinsky Uyezd (Калязинский уезд) was one of the subdivisions of the Tver Governorate of the Russian Empire. It was situated in the eastern part of the governorate. Its administrative centre was Kalyazin. In terms of present-day administrative borders, the territory of Kalyazinsky Uyezd is divided between the Kalyazinsky, Kashinsky and Kimrsky districts of Tver Oblast and Taldomsky District of Moscow Oblast.

== Demographics ==
At the time of the Russian Empire Census of 1897, Kalyazinsky Uyezd had a population of 111,807. Of these, 99.9% spoke Russian as their native language.
