= Mologa =

Former town in Russia

Coordinates: 58°11.98′N 38°26.47′E

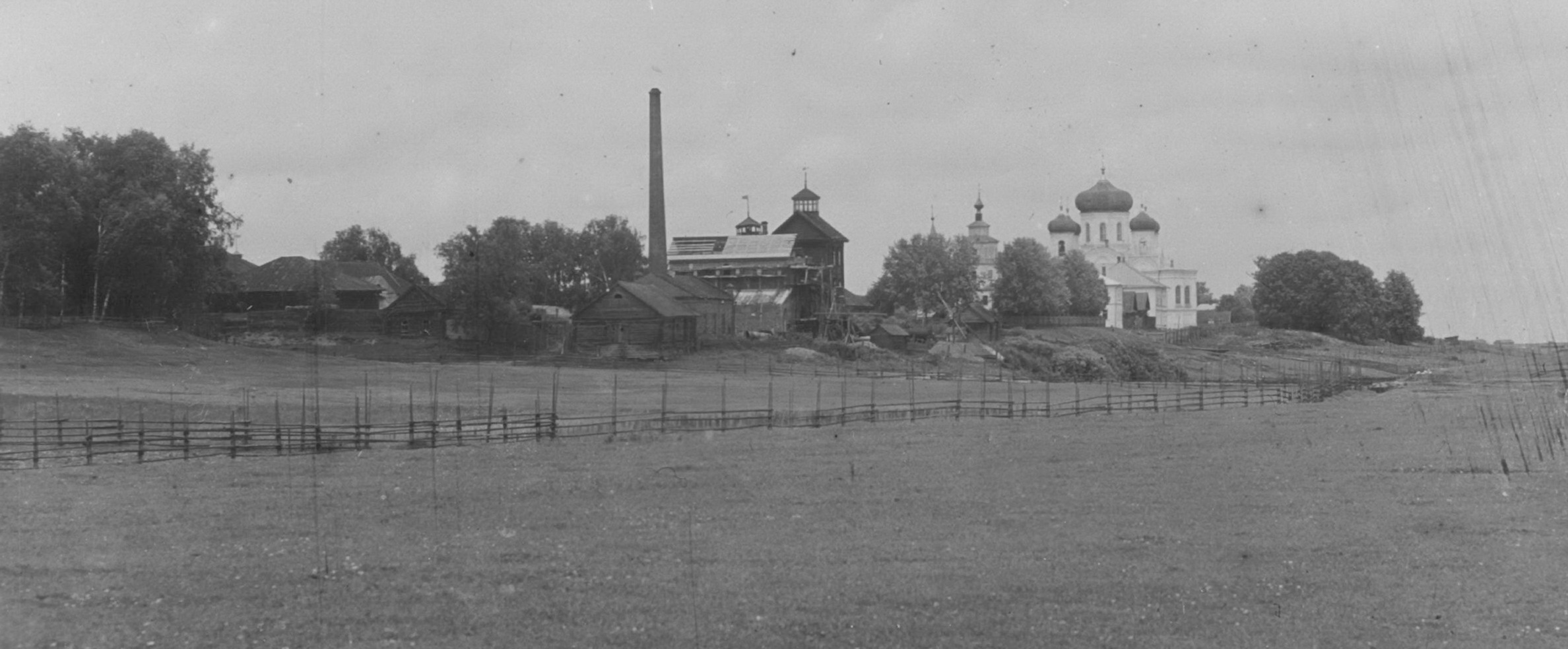
A view of Mologa around 1910

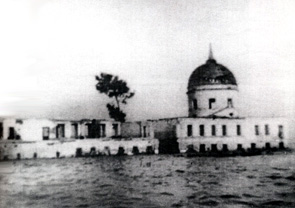
Afanasyevsky convent in Mologa being submerged in 1941

Mologa (Russian: Моло́га) was a town in Yaroslavl Oblast, Russia, formerly situated at the confluence of the rivers Mologa and Volga, but now submerged under the waters of the Rybinsk Reservoir.

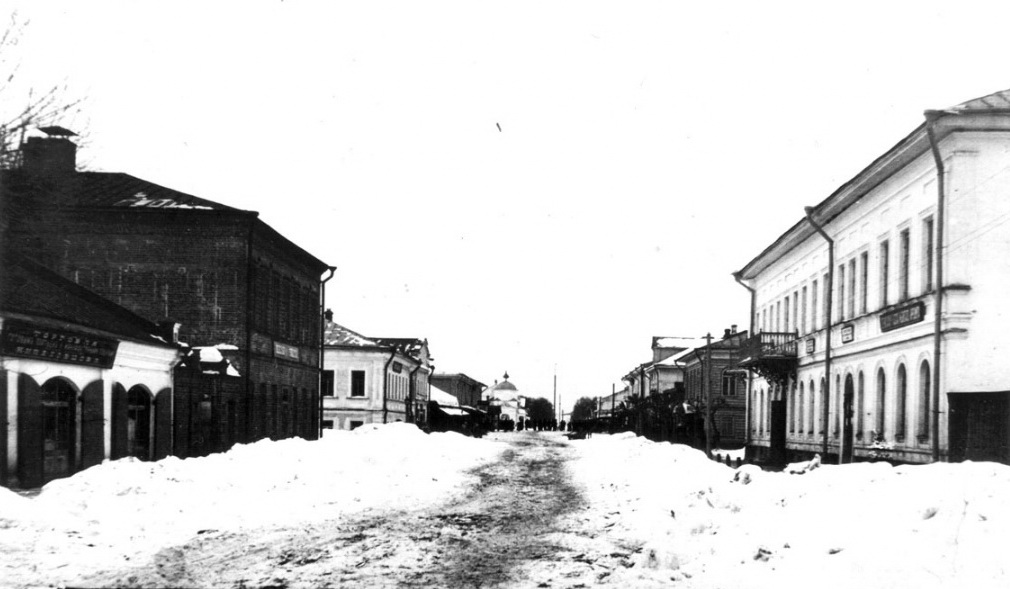
A street in Mologa before the inundation

Mologa existed at least since the 12th century. It was a part of the Principality of Rostov in the early 13th century. Later on, the town was annexed by the Principality of Yaroslavl. In 1321, it became the center of an independent principality. Soon after that, Ivan III annexed Mologa in favor of the Muscovy. Thereupon Mologa's rulers moved to Moscow, where they have been known as Princes Prozorovsky and Shakhovskoy.

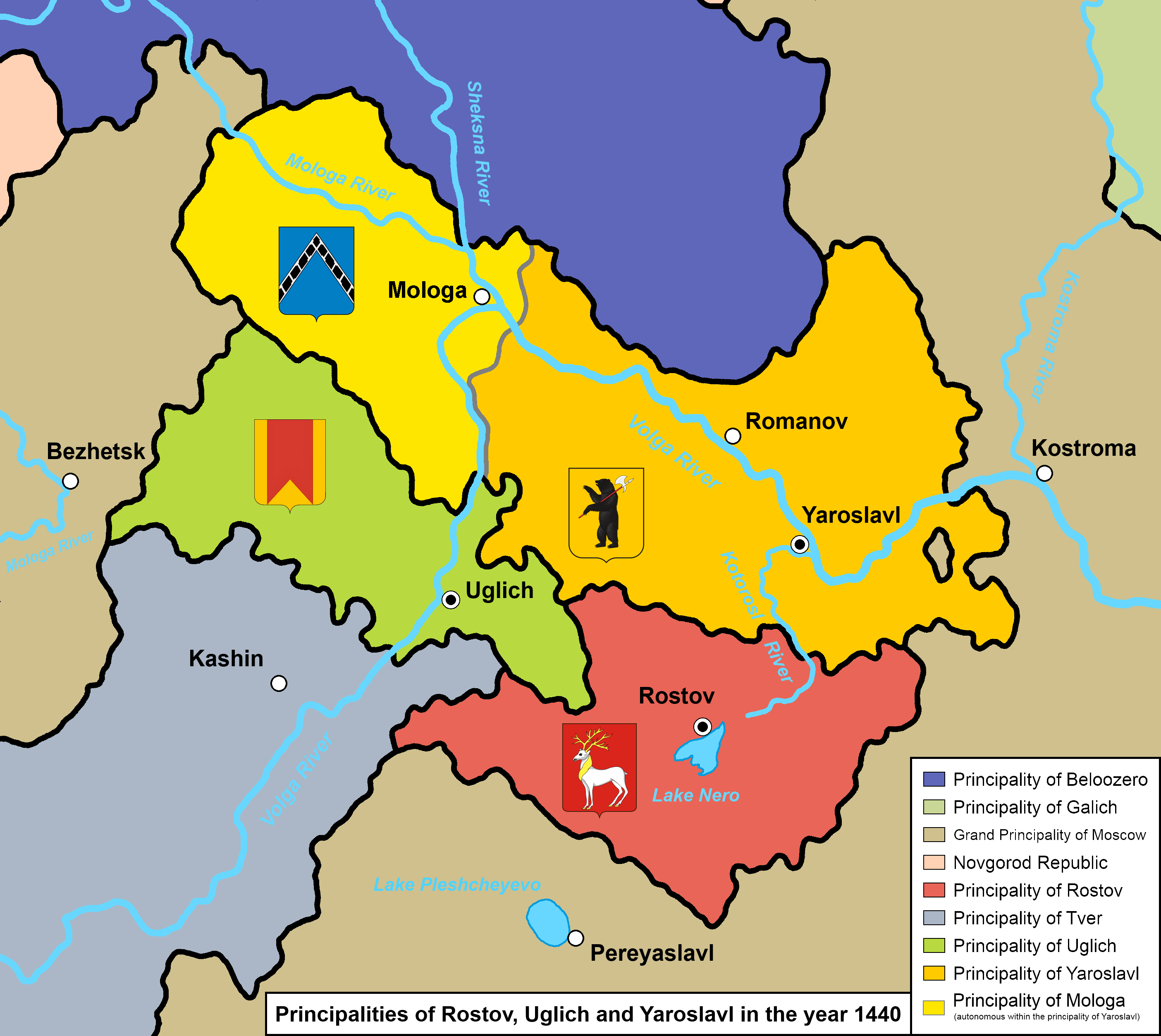
Principality of Mologa ca 1440

In the late 15th century, they relocated a fair from Kholopiy Gorodok (a town 55 km north of Mologa) to Mologa. After that, Mologa turned into one of the most important Russian trade centers with the Asian countries. According to an account by Sigismund von Herberstein, there was a fortress in Mologa.

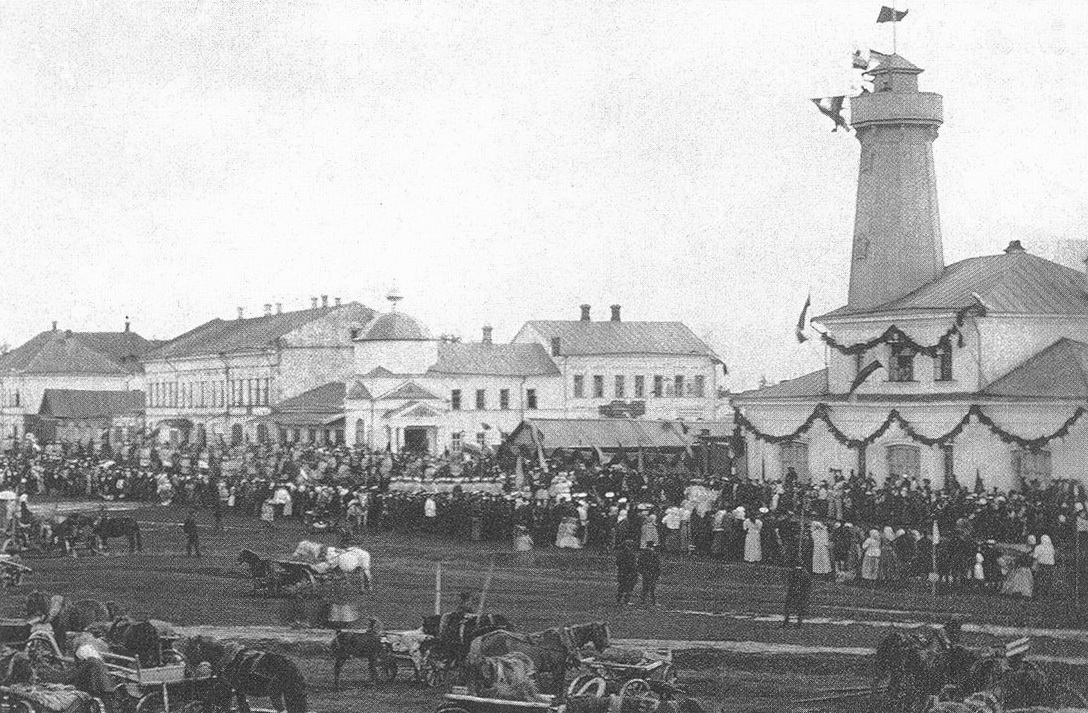
Sennaya Square during the annual fire brigade celebration in Mologa. A fire lookout tower (on the right) was designed by Andrey Dostoyevsky.

Following the Time of Troubles, Mologa thrived as a trade sloboda. In the 19th - early 20th centuries, it was a big staging post on the Volga because the town had been located at the beginning of the Tikhvinskaya water system, connecting the Volga with the Baltic Sea.

The flooding of Mologa was ordered in 1935 and following this order, during the construction of the Rybinsk Reservoir and Rybinsk hydroelectric plant. Its residents were relocated between 1937 and 1941. The final residents departed on April 14, 1941. The former town was completely underwater by 1946. Previous plans for the reservoir had spared Mologa, but the decission to increase the capacity of the Rybinsk hydroelectric plant led to the planned Rybinsk Reservoir rising from 98m to 102m above sea level; Mologa stood at 98m above the sea level. Around 130,000 people were forced to move from the city and the surrounding areas and settle in places such as Slip, Yaroslavl, Moscow, and Leningrad. 294 locals refused to leave their homes and eventually drowned. A monument was erected in 2003 to commemorate those who refused the evacuation order.

In 1992-1993 the level of the Rybinsk Reservoir decreased at 1.5m which permitted historians to organize the first expedition to a visible part of the former city. This resulted in collecting information for the future Mologa Museum and making a film.

April 14 is remembered in Yaroslavl Oblast as the Day of Mologa. On this day, the boats with monks and priests sail to the spot where Mologa used to stand, and hold divine service in front of the upper parts of cross-crowned belfries which are still visible above the water of the artificial lake.

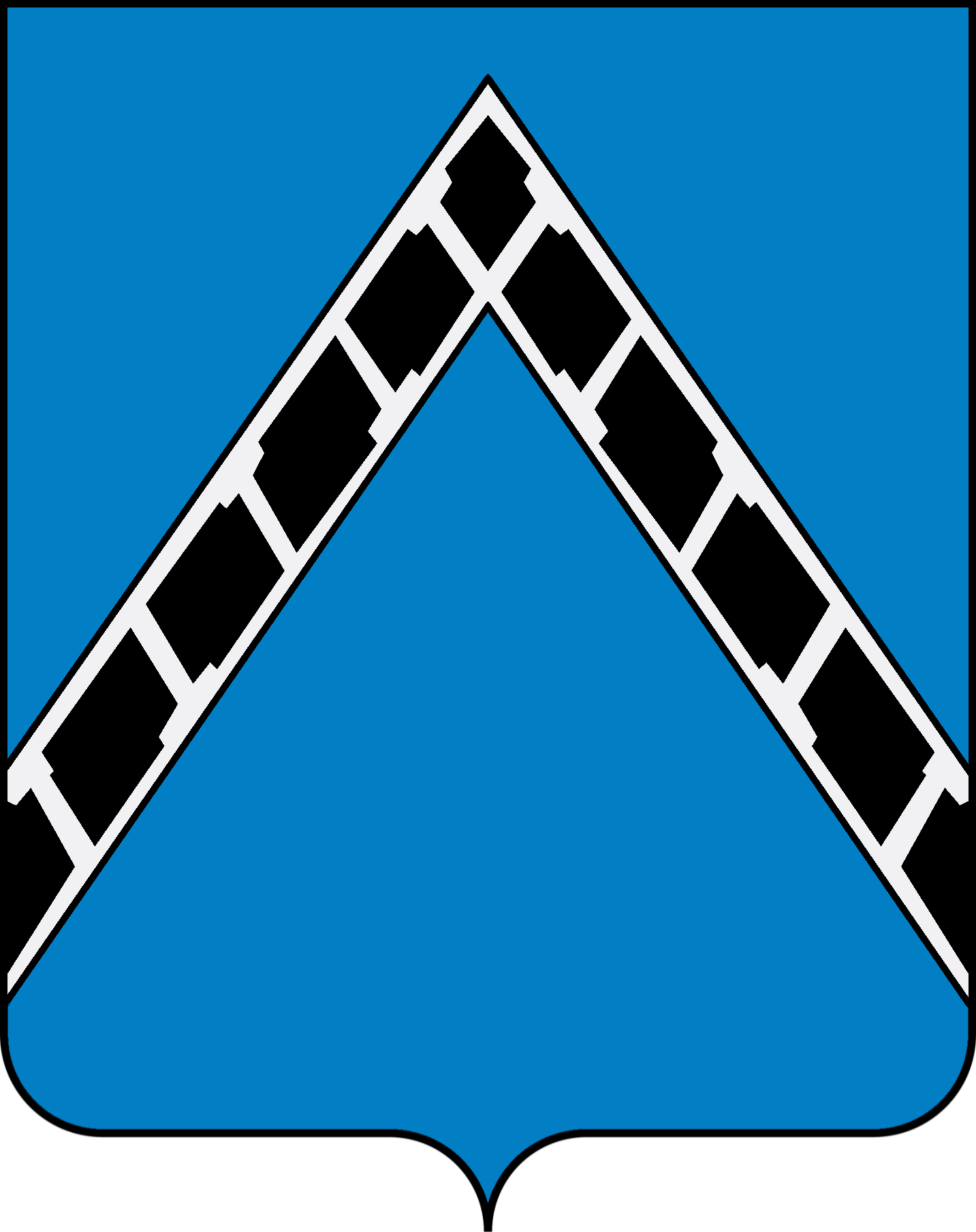
The coat of arms of Mologa (version without the bear)

Every second Saturday of August ordinary people visit Mologa's site on board of a ship.

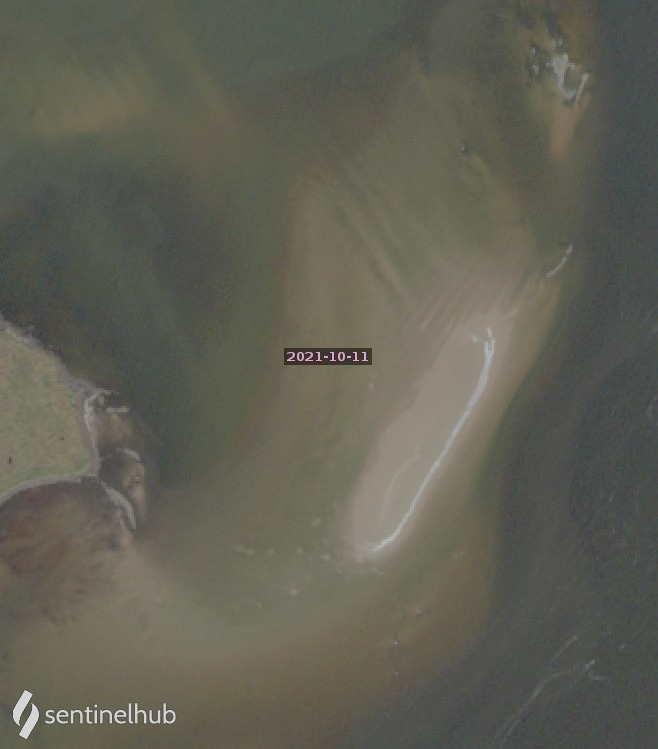
Satellite image of Mologa location on low water level (2021)

In August, 2014 the water level became extremely low, which let the former inhabitants of Mologa see their previous homes and wish to visit them on board of a ship.

== See also ==
- Korcheva
- Flooded Belfry
