= Flooded Belfry =

Bell tower of the inundated former St. Nicholas Monestary in Kalyazin, Russia

Coordinates: 57°14′37.06″N 37°51′26.30″E

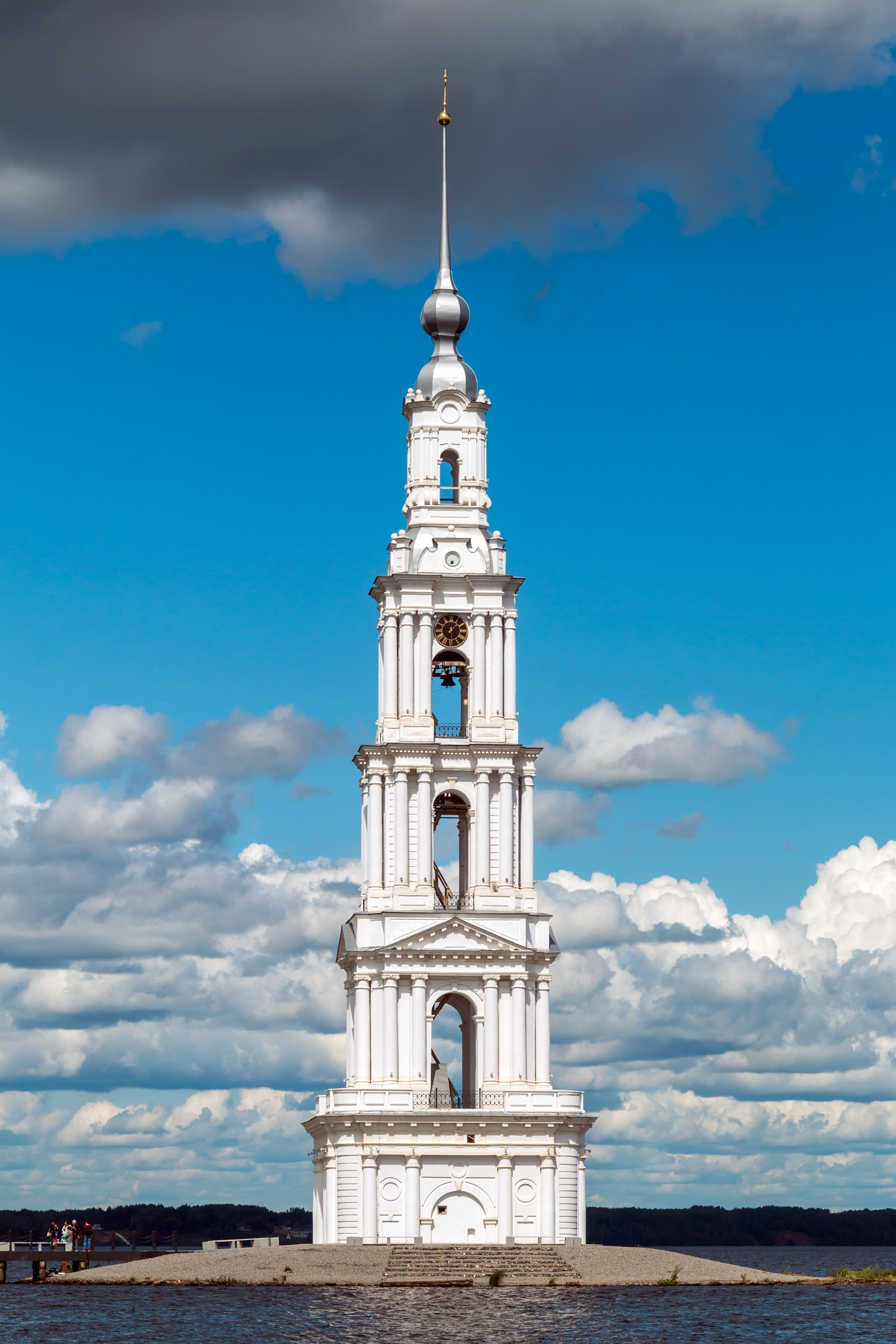
Kalyazin Bell Tower, a symbol of the old Russia that has disappeared after the Revolution

The Kalyazin Bell Tower (Russian: Калязинская колокольня, Kalyazinskaya kolokol'nya) is a Neoclassical campanile rising to a height of 74.5 metres (244 ft) over the waters of the Uglich Reservoir on the Volga River opposite the old town of Kalyazin, in Tver Oblast, central Russia.

== History ==
The steepled belfry was built in 1796–1800 as part of the Monastery of St. Nicholas, with a pentacupolar katholikon dating from 1694. Of its 12 bells, the largest weighed some 1038 poods (17,000kg). It was cast in 1895 to commemorate the coronation of Nicholas II of Russia.

In 1939, then Soviet leader Joseph Stalin ordered the construction of the Uglich Hydroelectric Dam to provide electricity to the region, which resulted in the formation of the Uglich Reservoir. As they were located in a depression, many old parts of Kalyazin, including several medieval structures, became submerged under the reservoir's waters. This included the Saint Nicholas Monastery and Troitsky Makariev Monastery. The katholikon flooded, and was subsequently dismantled, while the belfry was left as-is. It continues to tower above the waters to this day — almost entirely unsubmerged.

== Present day ==
The campanile became the main destination of tourist interest in eastern Tver Oblast. The structure's islet was shored up underneath, and has a small pier for boats.

Orthodox Christians hold a Divine Service in the belfry several times a year.

== Gallery ==
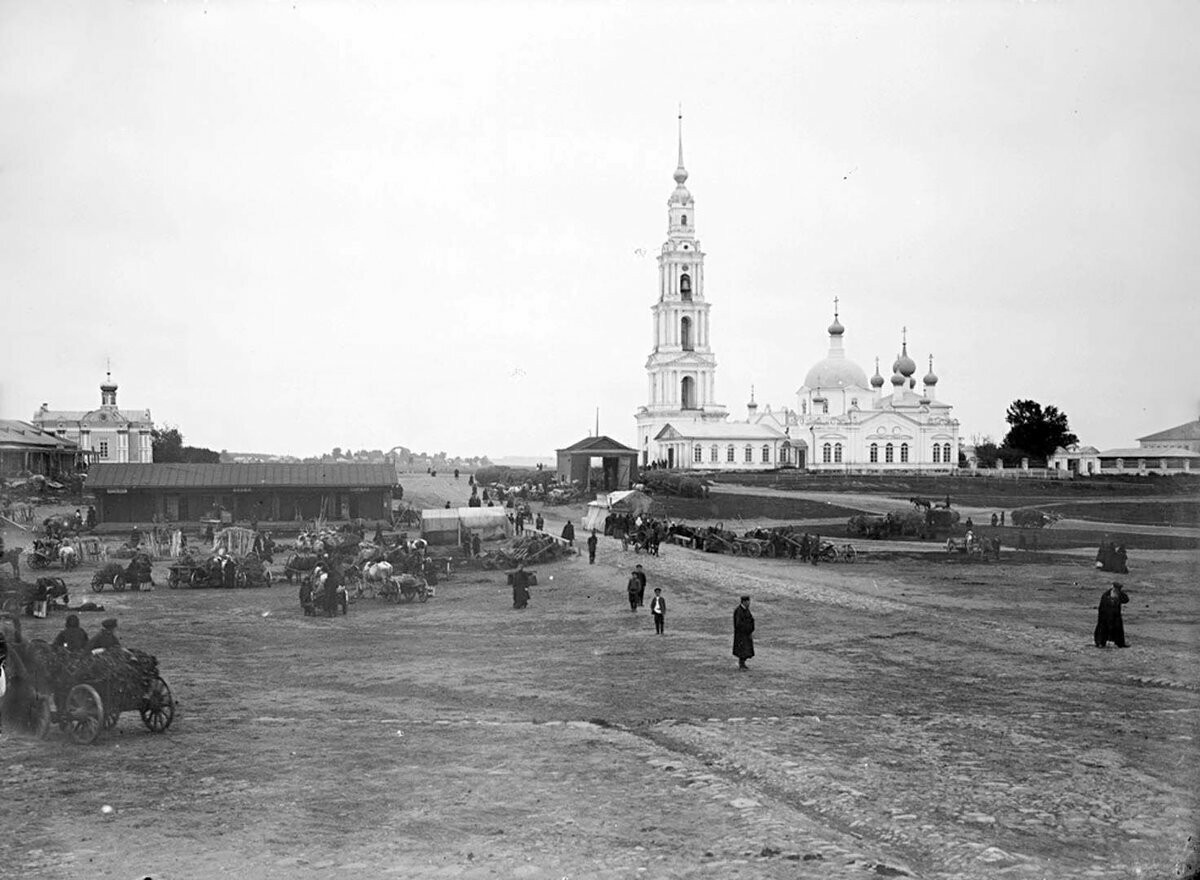
St. Nicholas Cathedral with bell tower in 1903

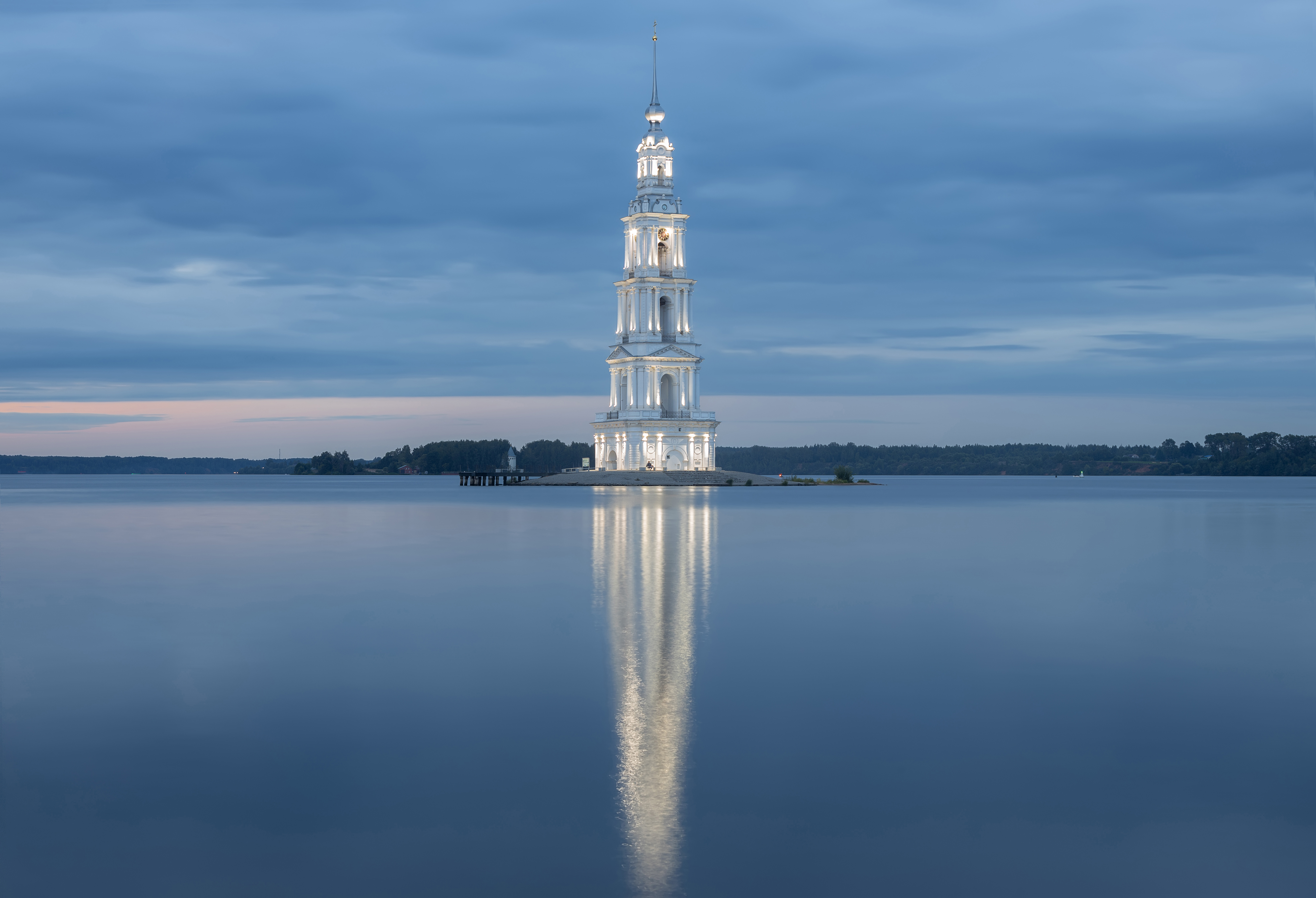
Bell tower at twilight

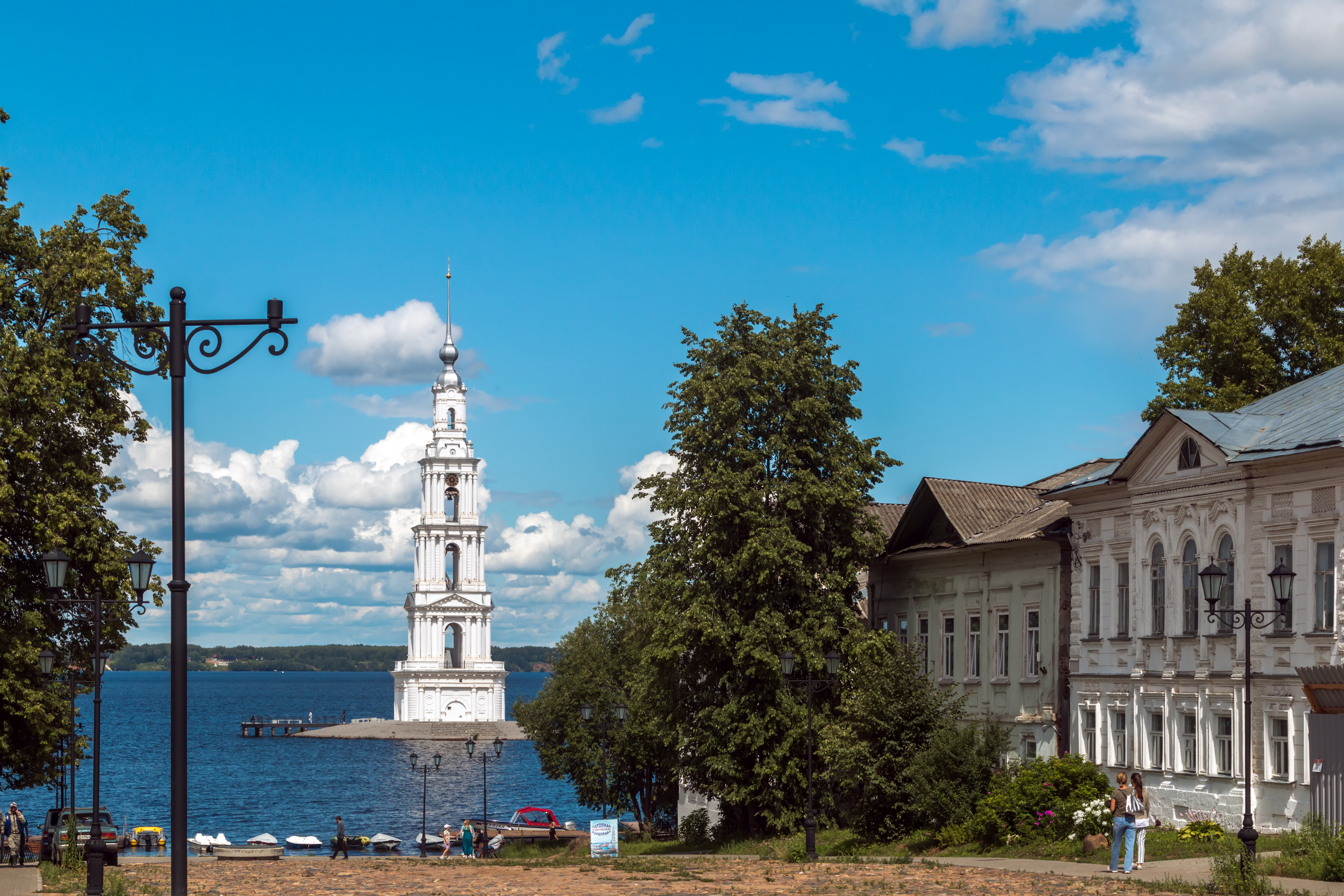
View from Kalyazin

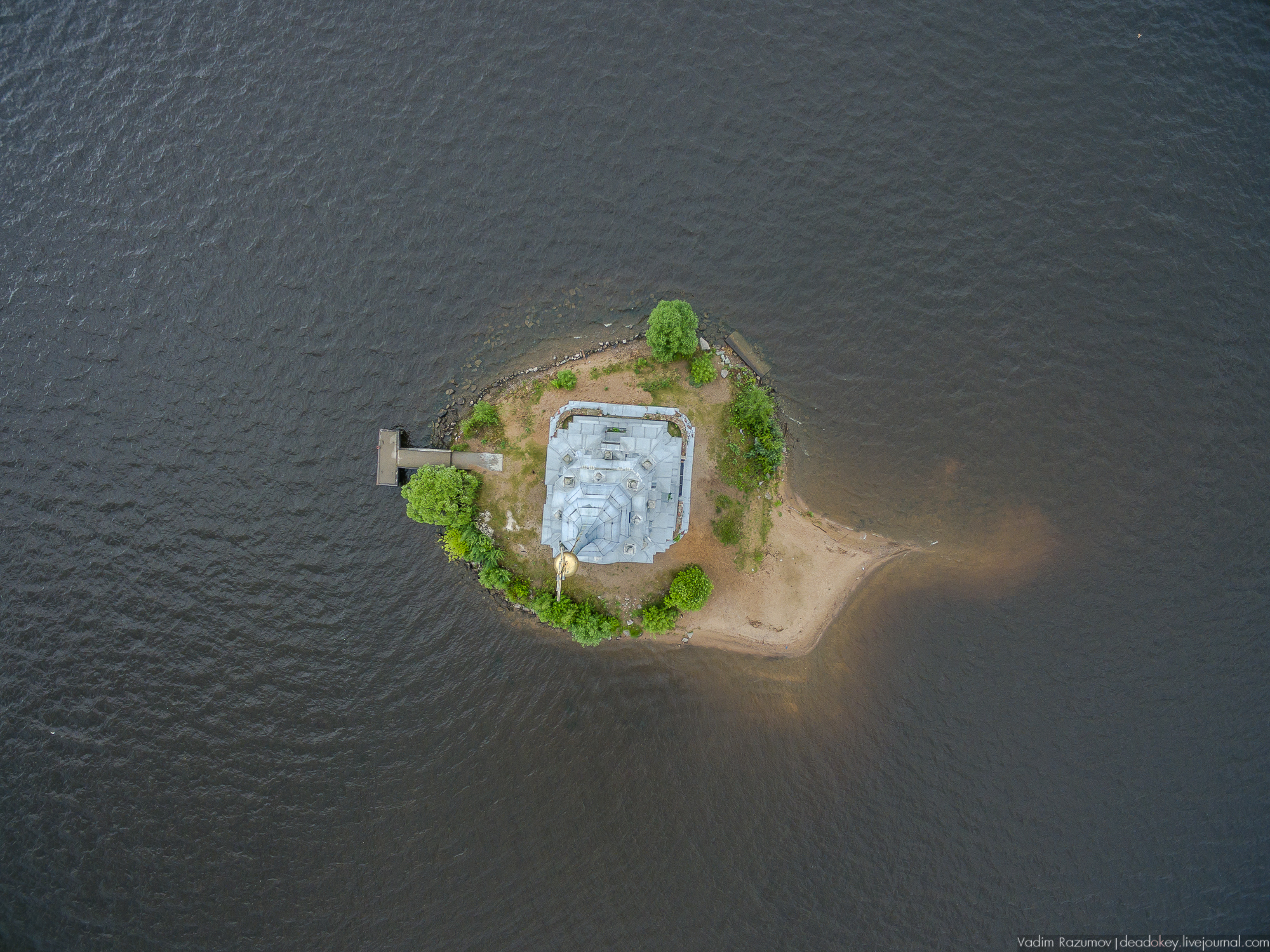
View from above

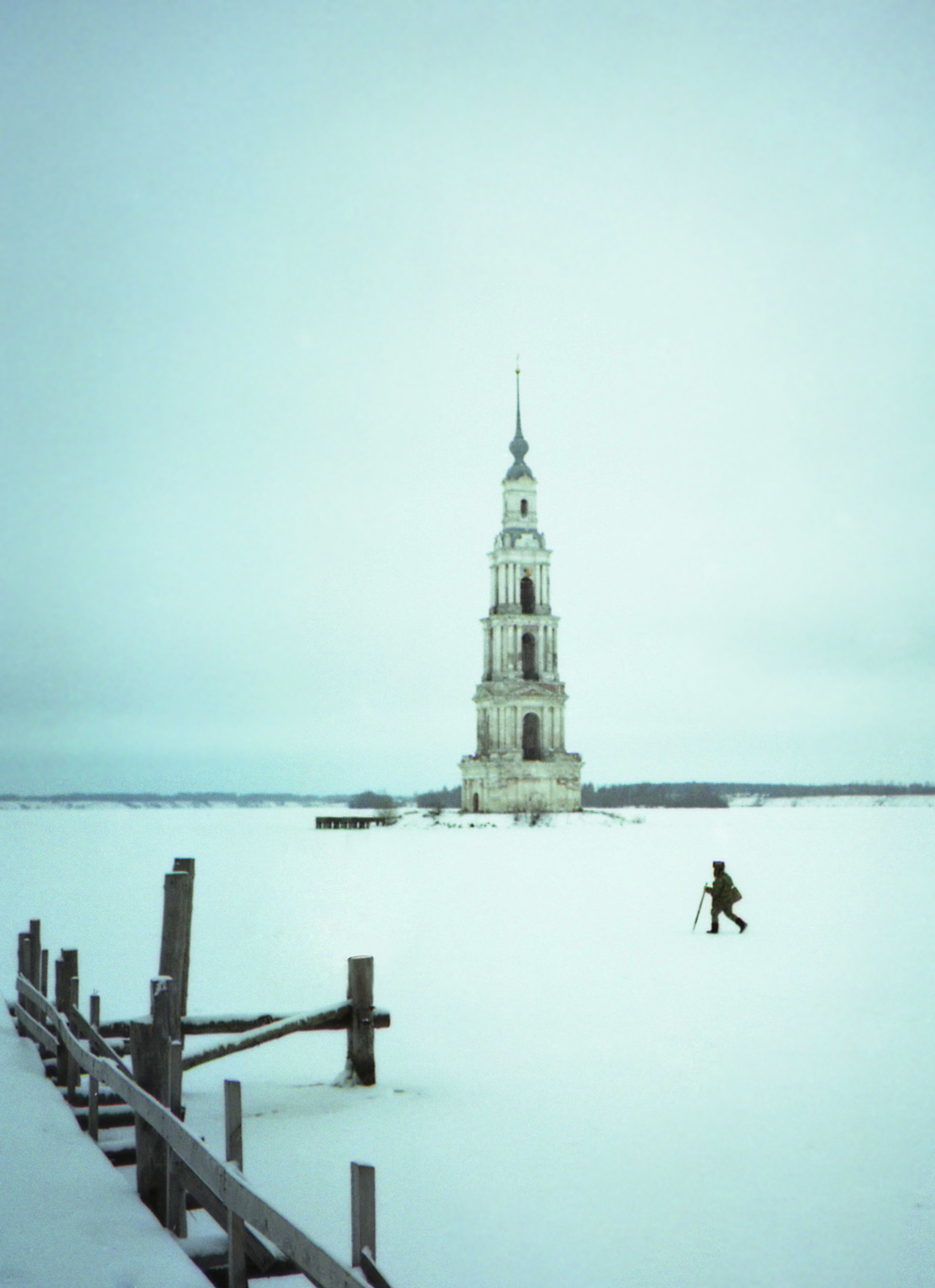
Bell tower in winter

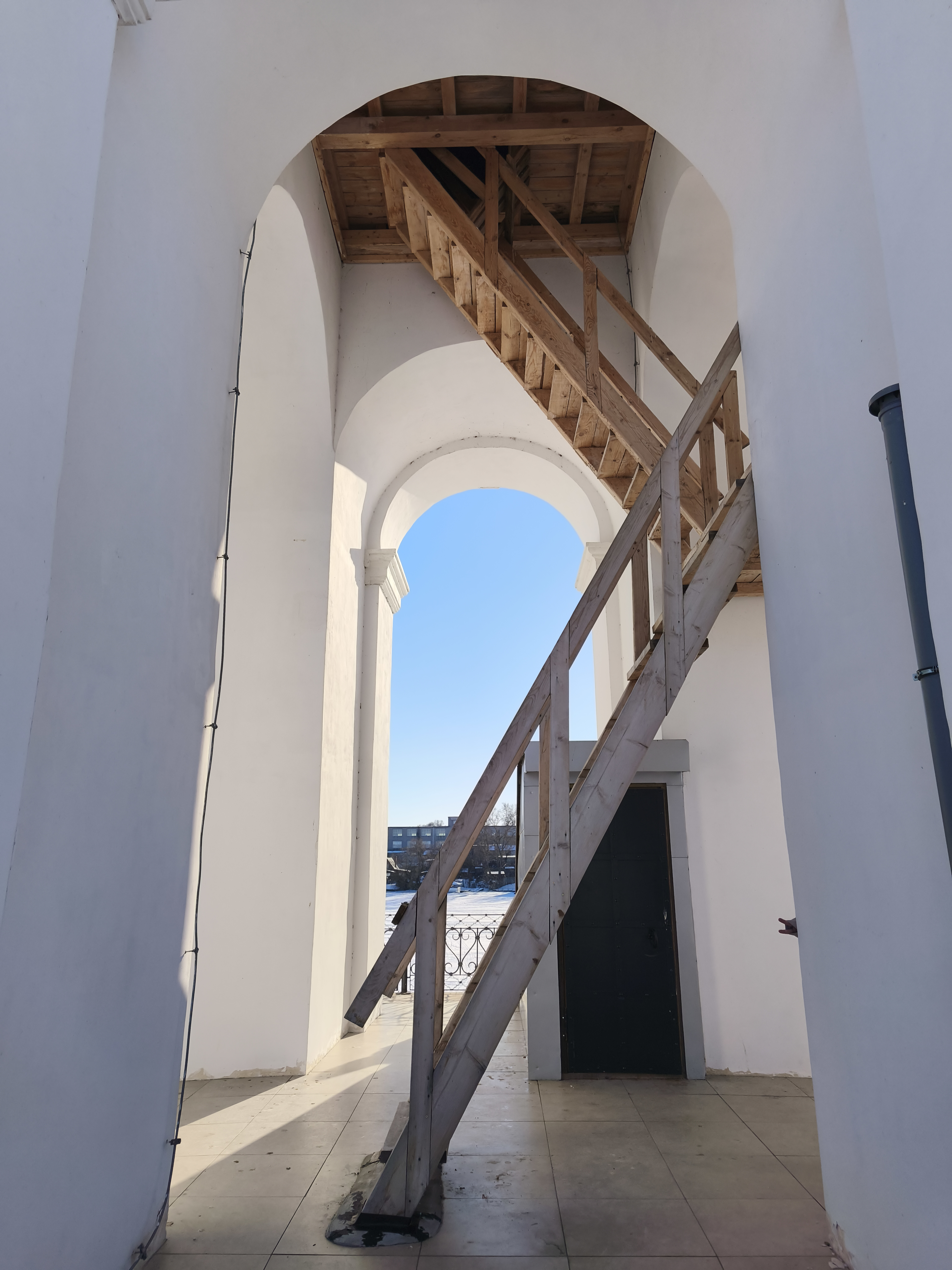
The second floor

== See also ==
- Mologa
- Korcheva
- List of tallest Orthodox churches
