= Uglich Reservoir =

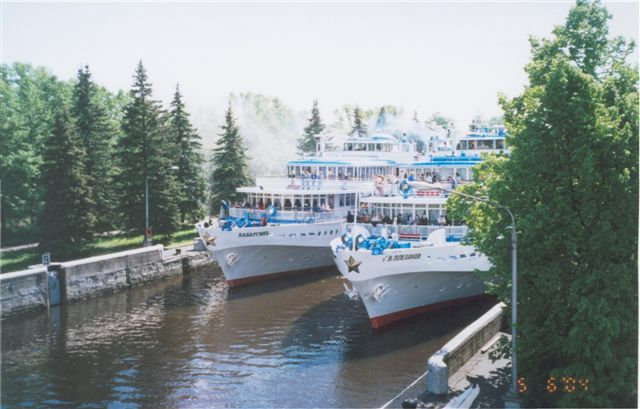
- A lock at Uglich Reservoir

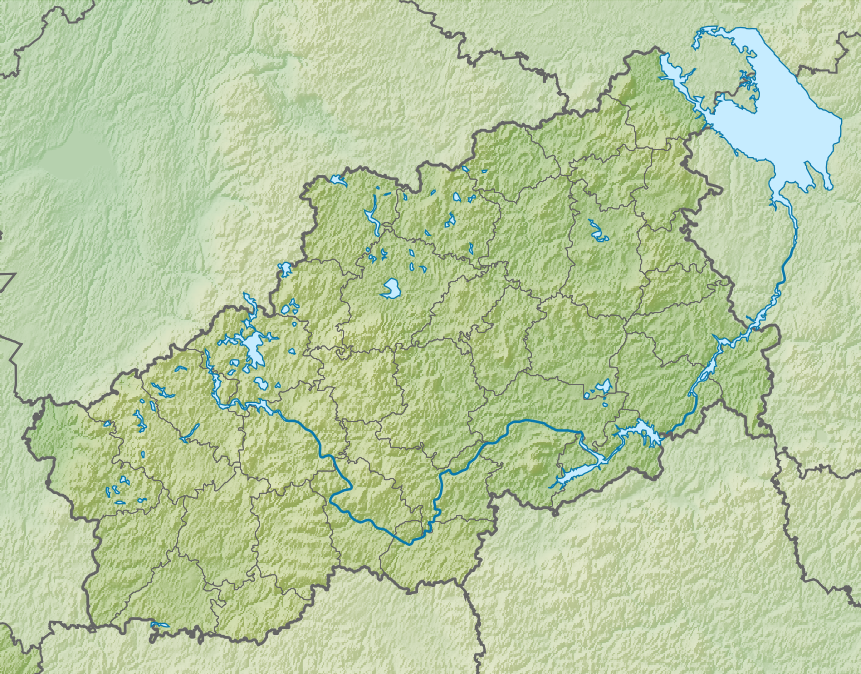
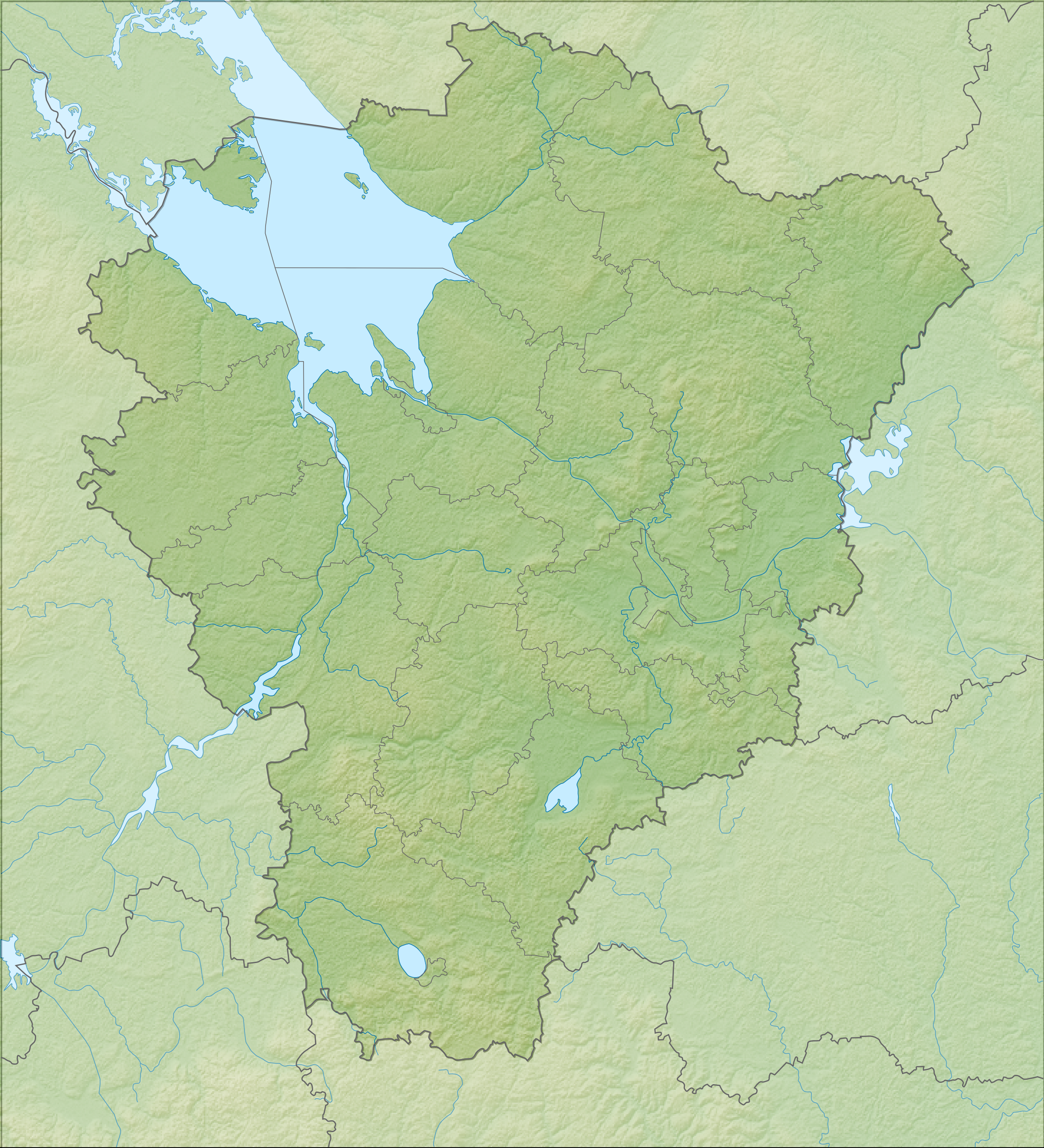
- Location within Tver Oblast Location within Yaroslavl Oblast Location within European Russia
- Coordinates: 57°15′N 37°50′E
- Type: Hydroelectric reservoir
- Primary inflows: Volga, Medveditsa, Kashinka, Nerl
- Basin countries: Russia
- Max. length: 143 km (89 mi)
- Max. width: 5 km (3.1 mi)
- Surface area: 249 km^{2} (96 sq mi)
- Average depth: 5 m (16 ft)
- Max. depth: 23 m (75 ft)
- Water volume: 1.24 km^{3} (0.30 cu mi)
- Settlements: Kaliazin, Kimry

Uglich Reservoir or Uglichskoye Reservoir (Russian: У́гличское водохрани́лище) is an artificial lake in the upper part of the Volga River formed by the Uglich Hydroelectric Station dam.

It was built in 1939 in the town of Uglich. It is located in Tver and Yaroslavl Oblasts in central Russia.

== Description ==
The Uglich Reservoir has a surface area of 249 km^{2} and a water volume of 1.2 km^{3}. Its length is 143 km, its maximum width 5 km, and average depth 5 m (with maximum depth of 23 m). The Uglich Reservoir was created for the benefit of transportation, energy, and water supply. It also performs seasonal flow regulation. The towns of Uglich, Kalyazin, and Kimry are located along the reservoir.

Consequences

The construction of the dam led to the 15th-century Intercession monastery in Uglich and 16th-century monastery in Kalyazin being submerged by the artificial lake. The Flooded Belfry is an example of a submerged landmark.
