= Kalyazin =

Town in Tver Oblast, Russia

Kalyazin Калязин
- Town
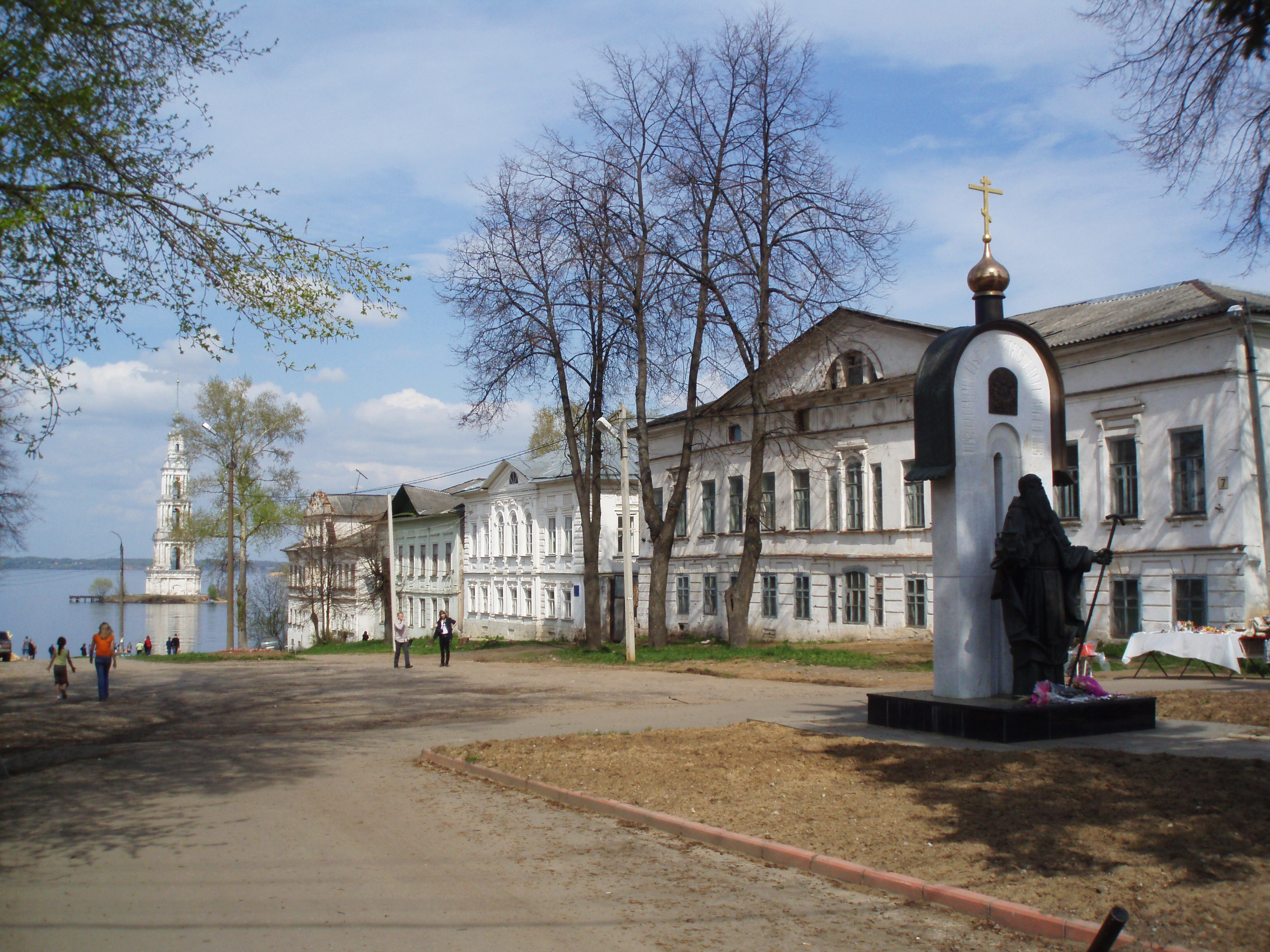
- In Kalyazin

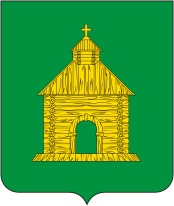
- Coat of arms
- Interactive map of Kalyazin
- Location of Kalyazin Kalyazin (Europe) Kalyazin (Russia)
- Coordinates: 57°14′N 37°53′E
- Country: Russia
- Federal subject: Tver Oblast
- Administrative district: Kalyazinsky District
- Urban settlementSelsoviet: Kalyazin
- Founded: 12th century
- Town status since: 1775
- Elevation: 120 m (390 ft)

Population (2010 Census)
  - Total: 13,867
  - Estimate (2021): 12,621 (−9%)

Administrative status
  - Capital of: Kalyazinsky District, Kalyazin Urban Settlement

Municipal status
  - Municipal district: Kalyazinsky Municipal District
  - Urban settlement: Kalyazin Urban Settlement
  - Capital of: KalyazinskyMunicipal District, Kalyazin Urban Settlement
- Time zone: UTC+3 (MSK)
- Postal codes: 171571, 171573
- OKTMO ID: 28622101001

Kalyazin (Russian: Каля́зин) is a town and the administrative center of Kalyazinsky District in Tver Oblast, Russia, located on the right bank of the Volga River, 175 kilometers (109 mi) northeast of Tver, the administrative center of the oblast.

== History ==
A sloboda (a settlement for people relieved from paying taxes) appeared on the site of modern Kalyazin in the 12th century. Its importance grew significantly with the foundation of the Makaryevsky Monastery on the opposite bank of the Volga in the 15th century. This abbey used to be the most conspicuous landmark of Kalyazin and comprised numerous buildings of historic interest, including a refectory from 1525. The name of the town originates from certain Kolyaga, a land proprietor in the 15th century.

In the 18th century, the area was included into Moscow Governorate. In 1775, Kalyazin was granted town rights and Kalyazinsky Uyezd was established. It was a part of newly established Tver Viceroyalty. In 1796, the Viceroyalty was abolished and transformed into Tver Governorate. Kalyazinsky Uyezd was abolished, but in 1803, it was re-established. On May 30, 1922, Kalyazinsky Uyezd was abolished and merged into Kashinsky Uyezd. On October 3, 1927, Kashinsky Uyezd itself was abolished and split between Bezhetsky and Kimrsky Uyezds.

On August 12, 1929, Tver Governorate was abolished, with its territory transferred to Moscow Oblast. Uyezds were abolished as well, and Kalyazinsky District, with the administrative center in Kalyazin, was established within Kimry Okrug of Moscow Oblast. On July 23, 1930, the okrugs were abolished and the districts were directly subordinated to the oblast. On January 29, 1935, Kalinin Oblast was established, and Kalyazinsky District was transferred to it.

In 1940, the monastery and most of the old town were submerged under water during the construction of the Uglich Hydroelectric Station, which created the Uglich Reservoir. After that, the town was effectively relocated to a new, higher spot.

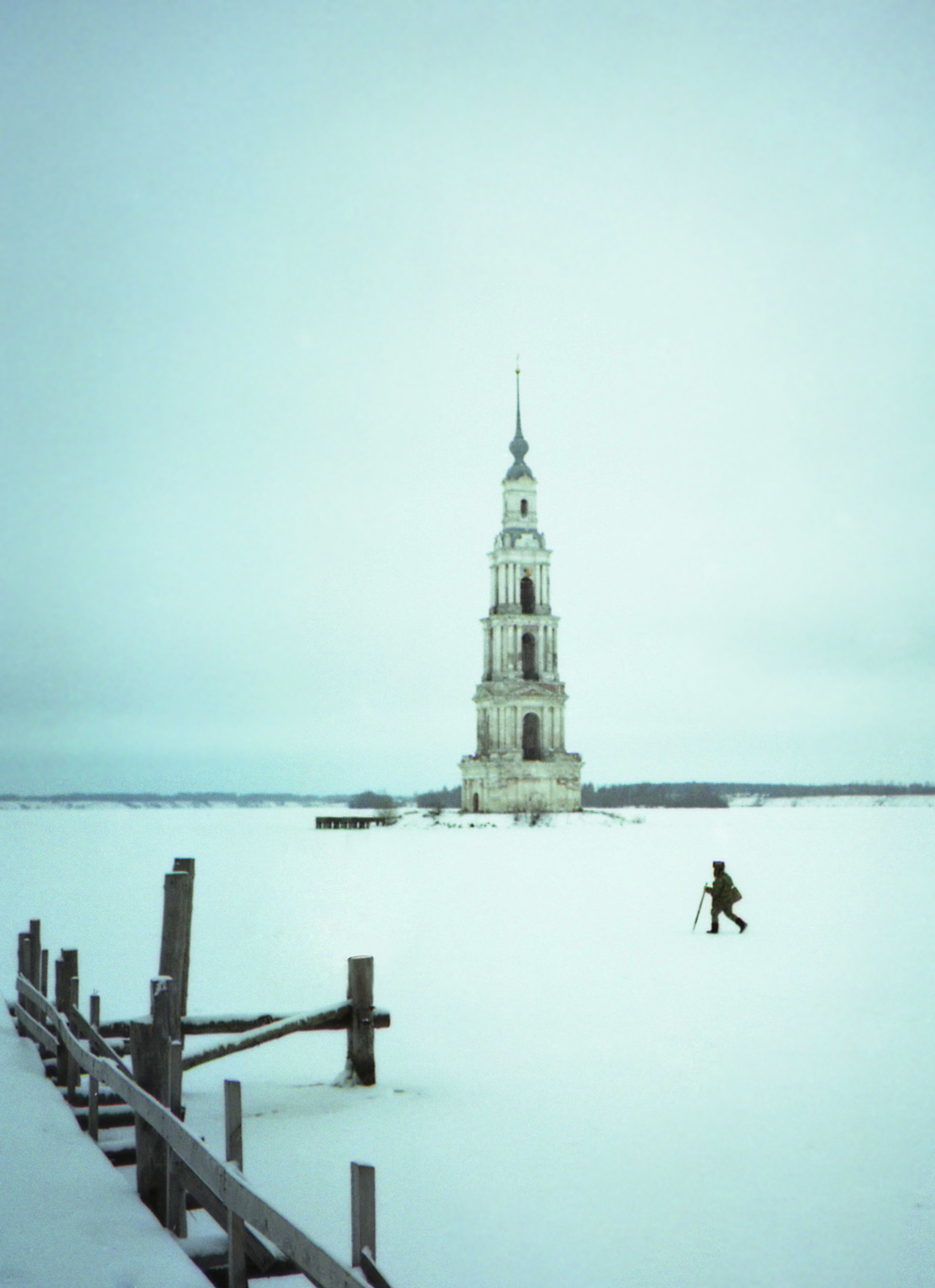
The Flooded Belfry is a part of the flooded church and the most eye-catching landmark of Kalyazin

On February 13, 1963, during the abortive Khrushchev's administrative reform, Kalyazinsky District was merged into Kimrsky District, but on March 4, 1964 it was re-established. In July 1990, Kalinin Oblast was renamed Tver Oblast.

On November 19, 2001, a chartered IRS Aero Ilyushin Il-18 airplane crashed in Kalyazin, killing all twenty-seven on board. On August 26, 2010, dozens of Central Asian guest workers were deported from the town after mass clashes with the locals. Their construction site jobs were given to locals instead.

== Administrative and municipal status ==
Within the framework of administrative divisions, Kalyazin serves as the administrative center of Kalyazinsky District. As an administrative division, it is incorporated within Kalyazinsky District as Kalyazin Urban Settlement. As a municipal division, this administrative unit also has urban settlement status and is a part of Kalyazinsky Municipal District.

== Population ==
Population since 1989: 13,867 (2010 census); 14,820 (2002 census); 15,544 (1989 Soviet census).

== Economy ==
=== Industry ===
Two factories in Kalyazin—one producing oil extraction equipment and another one manufacturing some parts of MiG airplanes—are responsible for 42% of the total industrial production of the district. Chemical, food, leather, and textile industry are present as well.

=== Transportation ===
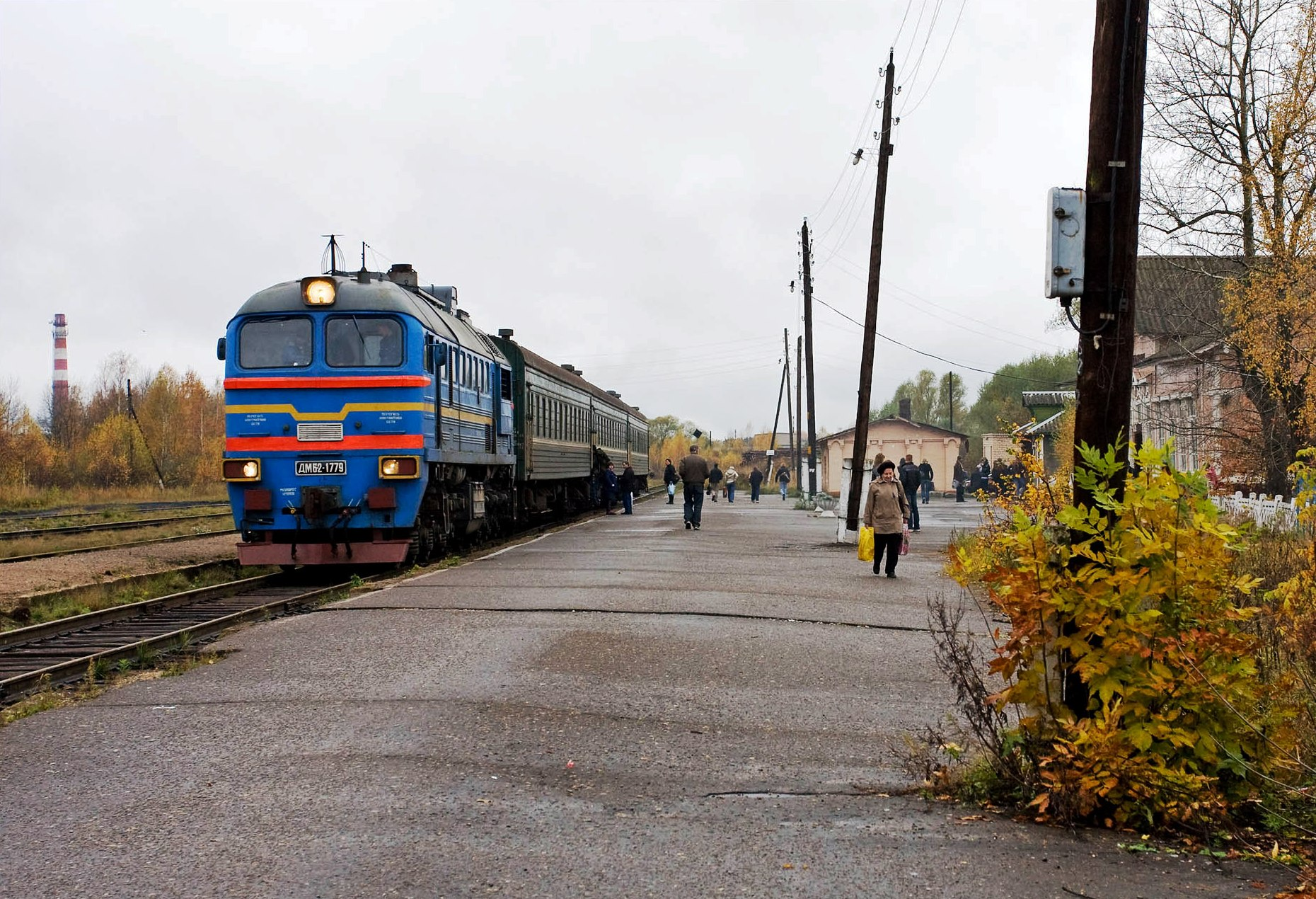
The Kalyazin railway station

Kalyazin is connected by train to Moscow (Moscow Savyolovsky railway station), Kashin, Uglich, Rybinsk, Sonkovo, Savyolovo.

Kalyazin is connected by roads with Sergiyev Posad, Uglich, and with Tver and Kimry via Kashin. There are local roads as well. There is local bus traffic originating from Kalyazin.

The Volga is navigable; however, there is no passenger navigation.

== Culture and recreation ==
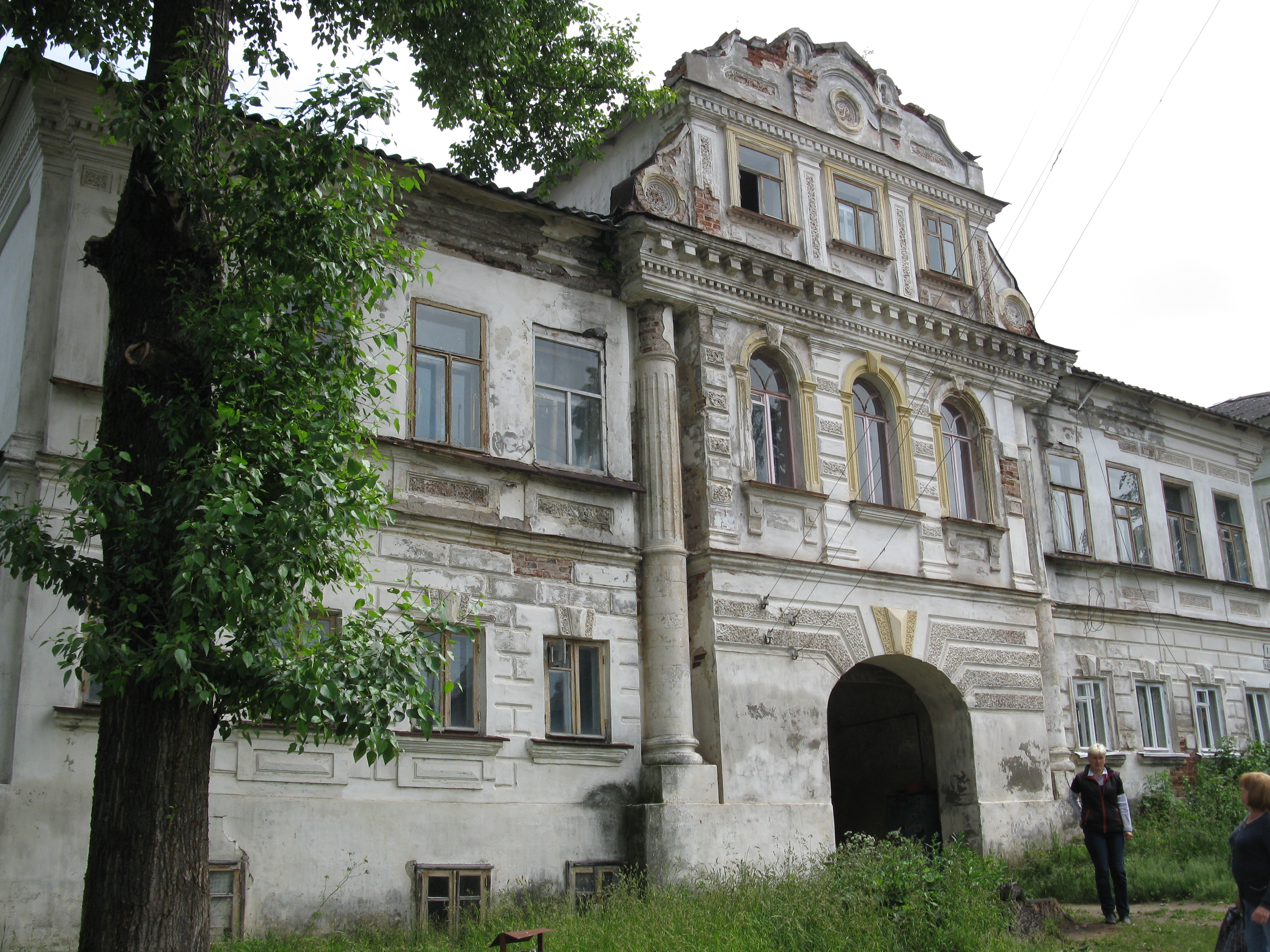
Former Ryzhkov House, a cultural heritage monument

Kalyazin contains sixteen cultural heritage monuments of federal significance and additionally twenty-two objects classified as cultural and historical heritage of local significance. The town landmark is the Kalyazin Bell Tower, submerged by the Uglich Reservoir and located only partially above the water level. Other federal monuments include the ensemble of administrative buildings and living houses in the center of the town, and the Ascension and the Epiphany Churches.

The Kalyazinsky District Museum is located in Kalyazin.

== See also ==
- Kalyazin RT-64 radio telescope
