= Lyakhovo =

Lyakhovo (Russian: Ляхово) is the name of several rural localities in Russia, all of them listed here:

- Lyakhovo, Karmaskalinsky District, Republic of Bashkortostan, a village in Podlubovsky Selsoviet of Karmaskalinsky District of the Republic of Bashkortostan
- Lyakhovo, Yermekeyevsky District, Republic of Bashkortostan, a village in Spartaksky Selsoviet of Yermekeyevsky District of the Republic of Bashkortostan
- Lyakhovo, Domodedovo, Moscow Oblast, a village under the administrative jurisdiction of the Domodedovo Town Under Oblast Jurisdiction, Moscow Oblast
- Lyakhovo, Odintsovsky District, Moscow Oblast, a village under the administrative jurisdiction of the Town of Kubinka in Odintsovsky District of Moscow Oblast
- Lyakhovo, Orekhovo-Zuyevsky District, Moscow Oblast, a village in Davydovskoye Rural Settlement of Orekhovo-Zuyevsky District of Moscow Oblast
- Lyakhovo, Stupinsky District, Moscow Oblast, a village in Leontyevskoye Rural Settlement of Stupinsky District of Moscow Oblast
- Lyakhovo, Nizhny Novgorod, Nizhny Novgorod Oblast, a village under the administrative jurisdiction of Prioksky City District of the city of oblast significance of Nizhny Novgorod, Nizhny Novgorod Oblast
- Lyakhovo, Balakhninsky District, Nizhny Novgorod Oblast, a settlement under the administrative jurisdiction of the work settlement of Bolshoye Kozino in Balakhninsky District of Nizhny Novgorod Oblast
- Lyakhovo, Pskov Oblast, a village in Velikoluksky District of Pskov Oblast
- Lyakhovo, Glinkovsky District, Smolensk Oblast, a village in Belokholmskoye Rural Settlement of Glinkovsky District of Smolensk Oblast
- Lyakhovo, Krasninsky District, Smolensk Oblast, a village in Neykovskoye Rural Settlement of Krasninsky District of Smolensk Oblast
- Lyakhovo, Velizhsky District, Smolensk Oblast, a village under the administrative jurisdiction of Velizhskoye Urban Settlement in Velizhsky District of Smolensk Oblast
- Lyakhovo, Andreapolsky District, Tver Oblast, a village in Andreapolsky District, Tver Oblast
- Lyakhovo, Bezhetsky District, Tver Oblast, a village in Bezhetsky District, Tver Oblast
- Lyakhovo, Kashinsky District, Tver Oblast, a village in Kashinsky District, Tver Oblast
- Lyakhovo, Rameshkovsky District, Tver Oblast, a village in Rameshkovsky District, Tver Oblast
- Lyakhovo, Staritsky District, Tver Oblast, a village in Staritsky District, Tver Oblast
- Lyakhovo, Torzhoksky District, Tver Oblast, a village in Torzhoksky District, Tver Oblast
- Lyakhovo, Borisoglebsky District, Yaroslavl Oblast, a village in Andreyevsky Rural Okrug of Borisoglebsky District of Yaroslavl Oblast
- Lyakhovo, Nekrasovsky District, Yaroslavl Oblast, a village in Klimovsky Rural Okrug of Nekrasovsky District of Yaroslavl Oblast
