= Yelizarovo =

Yelizarovo may refer to:

- Yelizarovo, Naro-Fominsky District, Moscow Oblast, a village in Naro-Fominsky District of Moscow Oblast, Russia
- Yelizarovo, Orekhovo-Zuyevsky District, Moscow Oblast, a village in Orekhovo-Zuyevsky District of Moscow Oblast, Russia
- Yelizarovo, Shakhovskoy District, Moscow Oblast, a village in Shakhovskoy District of Moscow Oblast, Russia
- Yelizarovo, Solnechnogorsky District, Moscow Oblast, a village in Solnechnogorsky District of Moscow Oblast, Russia
- Yelizarovo, Nizhny Novgorod Oblast, a village (selo) in Nizhny Novgorod Oblast, Russia
- Yelizarovo, Ust-Kubinsky District, Vologda Oblast, a village
- Yelizarovo, Vologodsky District, Vologda Oblast, a village
