= Cornelius Titov =

Russian Orthodox bishop (born 1947)

Metropolitan Cornelius
- Metropolitan of Moscow and all Rus'
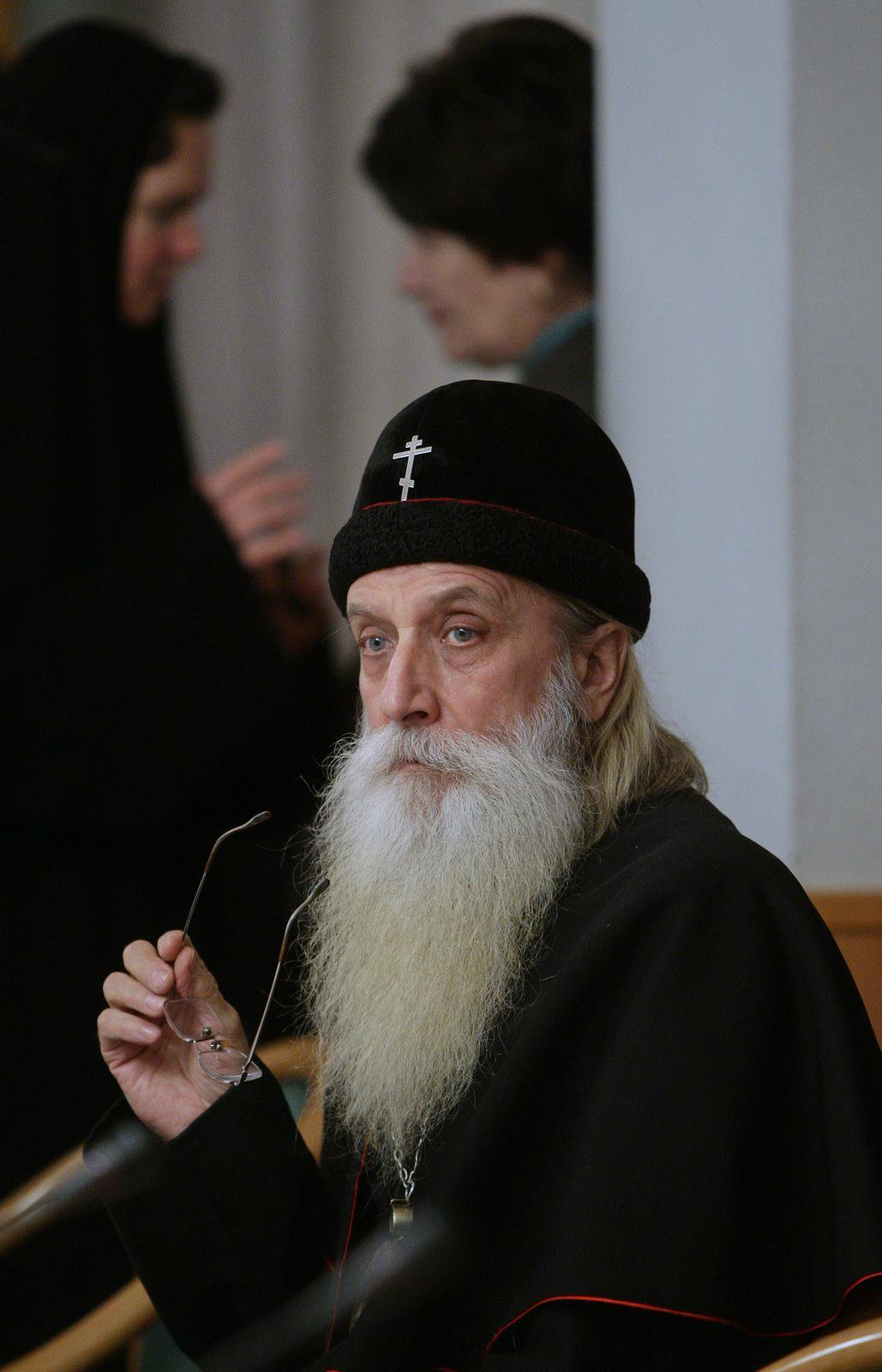
- Metropolitan Cornelius in 2014
- Church: Russian Orthodox Old-Rite Church
- See: Moscow
- Installed: 23 October 2005
- Term ended: Incumbent
- Predecessor: Metropolitan Andrian

Personal details
- Born: Konstantin Ivanovich Titov; August 1, 1947 (age 79) Orekhovo-Zuyevo, Russian SFSR, Soviet Union

Metropolitan Cornelius (Russian: Митрополит Корнилий; secular name: Konstantin Ivanovich Titov; Russian: Константи́н Ива́нович Тито́в; born August 1, 1947) is a bishop of the Russian Orthodox Old-Rite Church. He has served as the metropolitan of Moscow and all Rus', primate of the Russian Orthodox Old-Rite Church, since October 18, 2005.

== Biography ==
=== Early life ===
He was born on August 1, 1947 in Orekhovo-Zuyevo, Moscow Oblast, in an Old Believer family. He was baptized in infancy with the name in honor of the Equal-to-the-Apostles Constantine the Great. By his own admission: "I was born into an Orthodox Old Believer family, in the town of Orekhovo-Zuyevo. To be more precise, in Zuyevo, where the Old Believers originally lived. Before the revolution, there were several Old Believer churches and house of worship in our city, <...> Our Titov's house on Volodarsky Street, where I was born and grew up, was located next to the houses of famous Old Believers Morozovs and Zimins. We were friends with the Zimins as families. From early childhood, my grandmother, Maria Nikolayevna, took me to the Church, which was located on Kuznetskaya Street, it was called the "black prayer room", because monks once served in it. <...> There have always been icons and ancient church books in our house, although it was not safe at the time of atheistic persecution."

In 1962, after graduating from the 8th grade of school, due to family difficulties, he began to work: he became an apprentice turner at the Orekhovo-Zuyevo Cotton and Paper Mill foundry, an enterprise founded by Old Believer industrialists Morozov family. He worked at the Klavdia Nikolayeva Orekhovo Textile Mill, worked as the head of the Department of the foundry and mechanical plant.

During his work, he studied at evening school, technical college and the Moscow Automobile Mechanics Institute, from which he graduated in absentia in 1976. Because of his work at the state defense plant, he was not conscripted into the Soviet Army. He has worked for the plant for a total of 35 years.

In his youth, he was a member of the CPSU, however, as Archpriest Yevgeny Chunin notes, "he left the party long before 1991 — when he consciously joined the Church of Christ. Then this issue was considered at the confessional level and was successfully resolved long before the first ordination of the future metropolitan."

In the second half of the 1980s, he took an active part in the activities of the Kristall Sobriety club. Until 1997, he worked at the plant as the head of the technical control department.

=== Churchwarden, deacon, priest in Orekhovo-Zuyevo and bishop of Kazan ===
By his own admission: "after a long break, I came to our Old Believer church at 15 Sovkhoznaya Street, met the rector, Father Leonty Pimenov, who <...> discovered the depth of faith for me, which helped me to take a firm path to salvation of the soul, to learn a lot myself". However he did not graduate any theological institution.

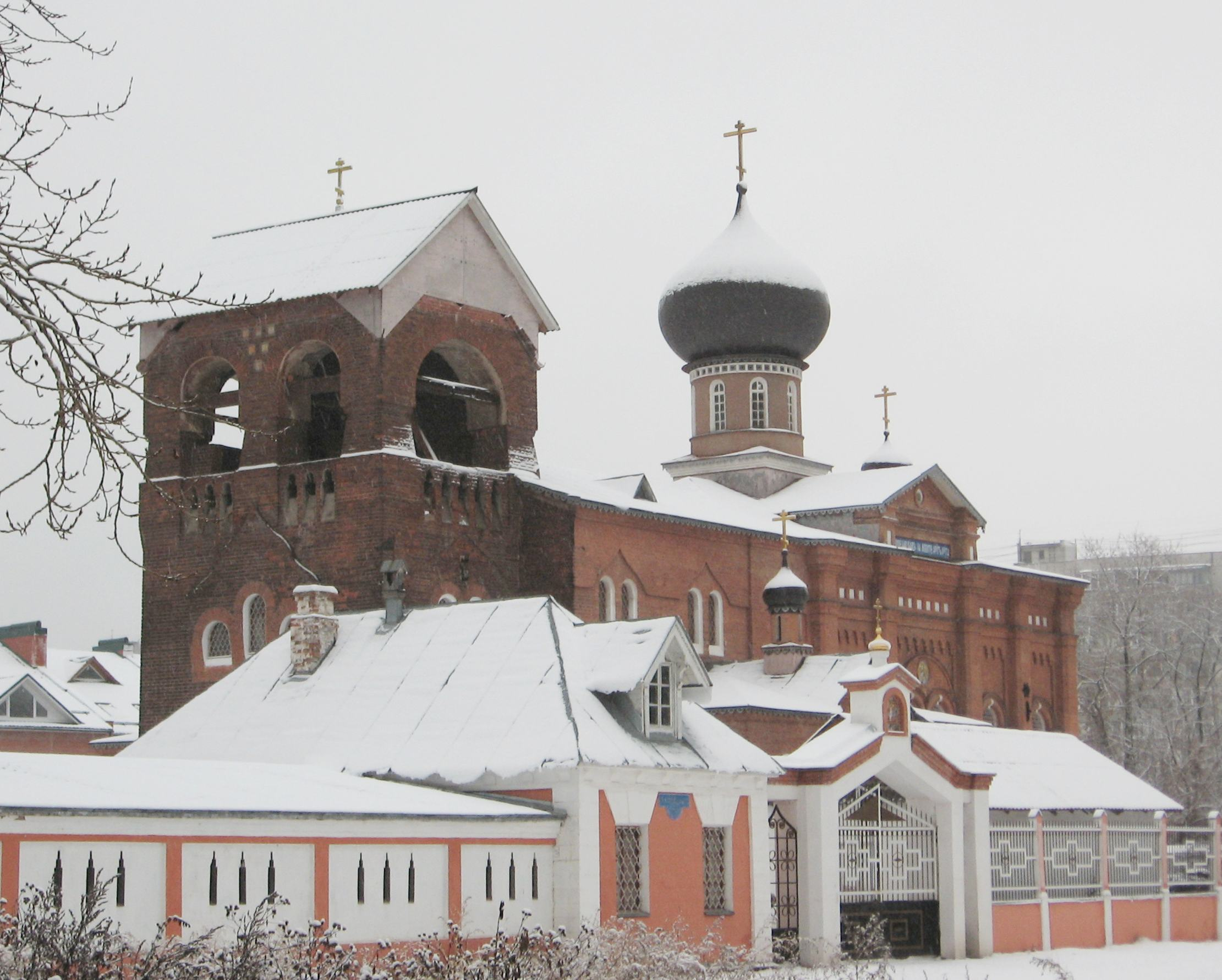
Church of the Nativity of the Most Holy Theotokos in Orekhovo-Zuyevo

In 1991, he became chairman of the church council of the Old Believers community of the Church of the Nativity of the Most Holy Theotokos in Orekhovo-Zuyevo, whose rector was priest Leonty Pimenov. During this entire period, he devoted a significant part of his time to the restoration of this dilapidated church.

At the beginning of 1997, he left his secular job, resigning from the position of head of the Technical Control Department of the plant, and completely focused on church activities. On May 11, 1997, on the feast of Myrrh-Bearing Women, having taken a vow of celibacy, he was ordained deacon by Metropolitan Alimpius (Gusev) of Moscow and all Rus.

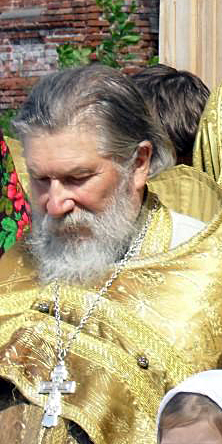
Priest Leonty Pimenov, a spiritual guide of Metropolitan Cornelius and an influential priest in the Russian Orthodox Old-Rite Church from the late 1980s to the late 2010s

He took part in the activities of the regional local history association "Radunitsa", established in 1997.

On March 7, 2004, Metropolitan Andrian (Chetvergov) of Moscow and All Russia was ordained a priest at the Pokrovsky Cathedral in Moscow, with his appointment as the second priest of the Church of the Nativity of the Most Holy Theotokos in Orekhovo-Zuyevo.

On October 20, 2004, at the Local Council of the Russian Orthodox Old-Rite Church, he was elected a candidate for bishop, and on October 21, he was also approved there as a candidate to fill the vacant Diocese of Kazan and Vyatka. He took monastic vows on March 14, 2005 with name Cornelius. However he competed celebrate his nameday on Constantine the Great day (July 3 according to Gregorian calendar).

On May 8, 2005, in the Pokrovsky Cathedral, Moscow, he was ordained bishop of Kazan and Vyatka. The consecration was performed by: Metropolitan Andrian (Chetvergov) of Moscow and all Rus, Bishop Siluyan (Kilin) of Novosibirsk and All Siberia, Bishop Herman (Saveliev) of the Far East and Bishop Eumenius (Mikheyev) of Chișinău and All Moldova. On July 21, the day of the celebration of the appearance of Our Lady of Kazan, the Enthronement to the See of Kazan was performed.

=== Election as primate and conflicts at the beginning of his primacy ===
He was elected metropolitan at the Local Council on October 18, 2005. He was not considered a favorite before, as he served as a bishop for only a few months, and before that he served as a priest for only a year. The vote had to be held three times. Other candidates were Archbishop John (Vitushkin) of Kostroma and Yaroslavl and Bishop Zosimas (Yeremeyev) of Don and the Caucasus. Only for the third time, 58-year-old Bishop Cornelius won more than two thirds of the votes needed for election. On October 23, 2005, in the Pokrovsky Cathedral at the Rogozhskoye Cemetery in Moscow, the rite of consecration was held, which was performed by Archbishop John (Vitushkin) of Kostroma and Yaroslavl, Bishop Sabbatius (Kozko) of Kiev and All Ukraine, Bishop Zosimas (Yeremeyev) of Don and the Caucasus, Bishop Eumenius (Mikheev) of Chișinău and All Moldova, Bishop Herman (Saveliev) of the Far East, more than 50 priests and 7 deacons. After the prayer service, Archbishop John presented the newly appointed Metropolitan with the staff of Metropolitan Ambrose of Belaya Krinitsa.

Shortly after his election as metropolitan, he declared himself as a follower of the course of his predecessor, Metropolitan Andrian, who headed the Russian Orthodox Old-Rite Church during 2004-2005. "Metropolitan Andrian's efforts aimed at overcoming the isolation of the Old Believers from the modern spiritual and cultural life of Russia, I will try to continue as much as I can. After all, this is the only way we can convey to our people the truth about the true Orthodox faith, which has not undergone reforms." He also stated his desire to maintain good-neighborly relations with the Moscow Patriarchate. At the same time, according to Sergei Vurgaft, who was dismissed from his post as the metropolitan's press secretary on December 25, 2005: "The idea of starting a conversation between the Old Believer Church and the Russian people was close to Metropolitan Andrian. But today these plans are not on the agenda of the Moscow Metropolitanate". Nevertheless, Metropolitan Andrian's active efforts to open the Old Believers to the general public inspired many people, but also gave rise to misunderstandings among isolationist representatives of the Russian Orthodox Old-Rite Church. Many of them were satisfied with Metropolitan Alimpius' closed management style, which did not promise any changes in the foreseeable future. The sudden death of Metropolitan Andrian and the election of Metropolitan Cornelius in 2005 finally deprived of peace those who sought in the Old-Ritualism quiet seclusion and isolation from the problems. Since the mid-2000s, reproaches against the leadership of the Russian Orthodox Old-Rite Church for its insufficiently harsh attitude towards the dominant Russian Orthodox Church had been increasingly heard, and the Metropolitan's contacts with government officials at various public and secular events had been condemned. Thanks to the development of the Internet, many were able to put forward their theory or judgment, making them the subject of universal discussion.

The Local Council of the Russian Orthodox Old-Rite Church, which took place in October 2007 in the premises of the former Church of the Nativity of the Rogozhskaya Sloboda, had a great resonance in the media. Some clergy and laity, led by Archpriest Elisey Eliseyev, demanded at the Council to discuss the behavior of Metropolitan Cornelius during his contacts with the "New Believers" of the Moscow Patriarchate. According to the former press secretary of the Moscow Metropolia, Sergei Vurgaft, "these frequent meetings cause concern that their ultimate goal will be the merger of the ROOC with the ROC". At the council, Metropolitan Cornelius agreed to streamline his external contacts in the future in accordance with existing rules and traditions; it was determined that, despite some mistakes of the metropolitan, he did not commit anything entailing canonical offenses. The delegation of the Diocese of Far East, headed by Archpriest Elisey Eliseyev, left the Council and stopped communicating with the metropolitan; the Council also defrocked Archpriest Elisey; confirmed that "The One Holy Catholic and Apostolic Church rejects ecumenism and anathematizes it" and reminded "Christians of the decisions of the Councils of our Church of 1832 and 1846, recognizing the New Ritualism as heresy of the second rank". Clarifications were made to the protocol of meetings with non-Orthodox clerics. A special Court ruling imposed restrictions on a number of clerics and laity ("to persons guilty of publicly spreading unfounded accusations against the primate through the Internet and other media"), in particular: "to excommunicate Alexei Shishkin and Andrei Yezerov from the shrine for a period until the issue is considered at the next Episcopal Court. On behalf of the Episcopal Court, impose enhanced penance on them"; "excommunicate monk Alimpius (Verbitsky), Dmitry Baranovsky and Dimitry Kozlov from church communion for the period of consideration at the next Council of the Metropolis of their written repentance published in the media". Yezerov, Shishkin and Baranovsky were speakers at the Council on the issues "On the heresy of Ecumenism and its apocalyptic significance", "on the heresies contained in the modern doctrine of the ROC MP" and "communism as an occult and mystical teaching", respectively. Observers regarded the Council's decisions as an attempt to change the course of openness adopted under Metropolitan Andrian. The secretary of the Moscow Patriarchate Commission on Old Believers' parishes and interaction with the Old Believers, Priest John Mirolyubov, said in connection with the conflict at the Council that he considers it to be caused by the activities of "neophytes" — "zealots of purity of faith", who shared "not any creative tasks, but blind hatred of the Russian Orthodox Church, from where they came, for the most part, and came out". Metropolitan Kirill (Gundyaev), Chairman of the DECR, expressed a similar opinion. Immediately after the 2007 Local Council, a couple dozen laypeople and several priests unilaterally withdrew from the subordination of the Moscow Metropolitanate, the very next day unanimously declaring themselves "not remembering Metropolitan Cornelius." This association was named the "Ancient Orthodox Church of Christ of the Belya Krinitsa hierarchy" (AOCCBKH). By 2008, a split had matured among the splinters. One part believed that the "AOCCBKH" was a temporary self—identification of the zealots until the "canonical order" was restored in the Russian Orthodox Old-Rite Church, the other part believed that the "AOCCBKH" was a church different from the Russian Orthodox Church. As a result, two groups of "zealots" took shape: the followers of Elisey Eliseyev, who began to call themselves "temporarily interrupted communication with the Russian Orthodox Old-Rite Church", considering it canonical; and those who believed that the Russian Orthodox Old-Rite Church, and at the same time the Metropolitanate of Belya Krinitsa, deviated into heresy.

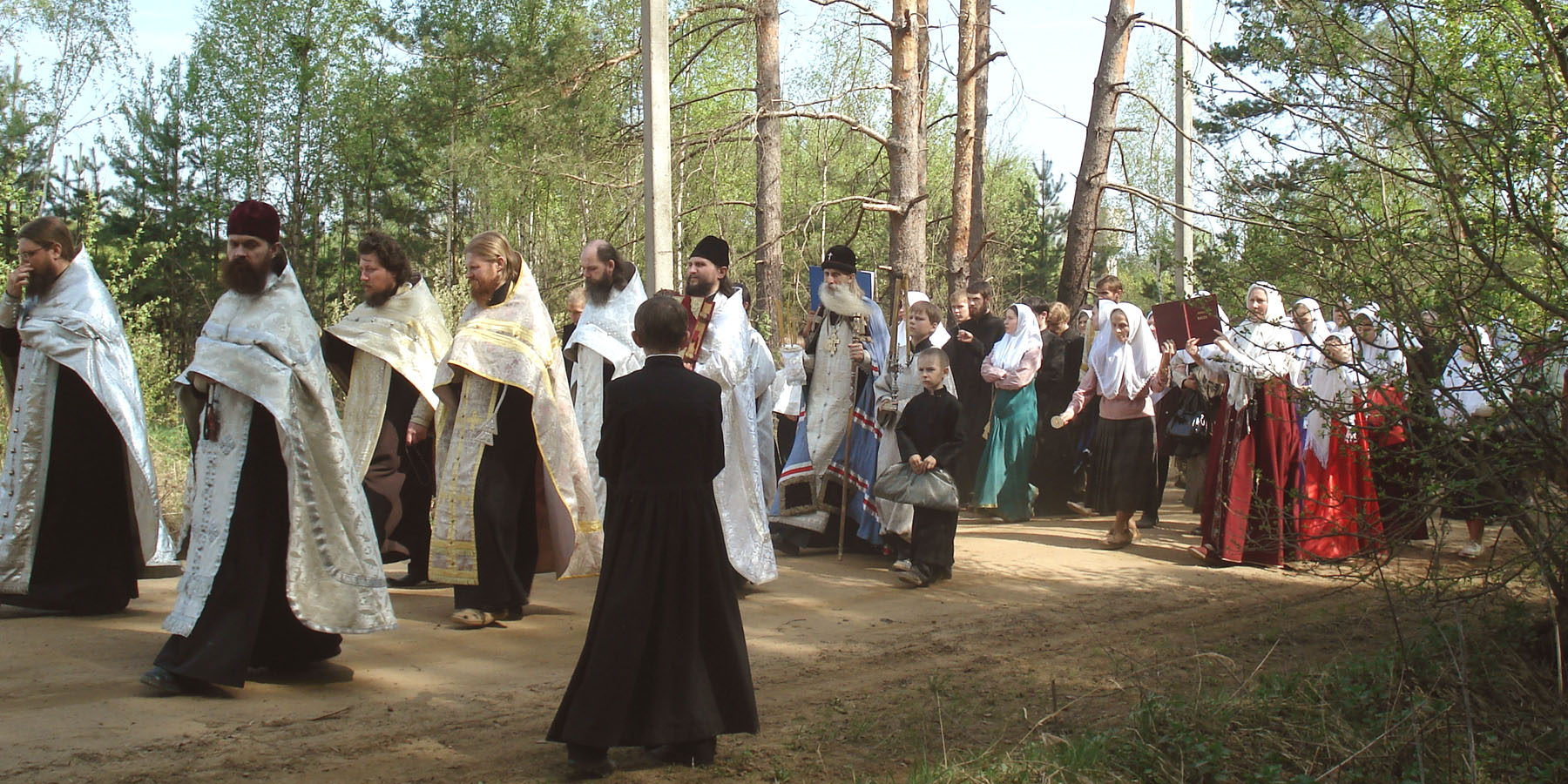
Metropolitan Cornelius during Crucession Davydovo — Gora — Yelizarovo — Lyakhovo, Guslitsa, Moscow oblast (May 02, 2008)

On October 15, 2008, under the chairmanship of Metropolitan Cornelius of Moscow and All Rus, the Local Council opened in the Pokrovsky Cathedral of the Rogozhskoye Cemetery; about 170 delegates were registered. On the first day of the council's work, Metropolitan Cornelius made a report on the current state of affairs in the Russian Orthodox Church, relations with "non-Orthodox" and other Old Believer movements. In response to an appeal addressed to him by a group of Christians from the Far East who wanted to "receive an answer about [his] hope," he, in particular, said: "<...> I answer that, trusting in the mercy of the Lord in the forgiveness of my sins and the intercession of the Most Holy Theotokos, I hope and believe that I can only be saved in the True Church of Christ, which is the Russian Orthodox Old-Rite Church. <...>». Thus Metropolitan Cornelius emerged victorious from this struggle: the council did not support a group of people who opposed contacts with the Moscow Patriarchate and with society, and splinter group eventually became disorganized and disappeared, and many of its members reconciled with Metropolitan Cornelius or moved away from activities. Despite the turmoil experienced, according to observers and the Old Believers themselves, in the 2000s there was a significant influx of new followers into the Old Believers, especially from the Russian Orthodox Church, which was facilitated by a policy of greater openness towards the general public. At the same time, the influx of new members exacerbated the problems of continuity, preservation of traditions and internal integration.

=== 2010s ===
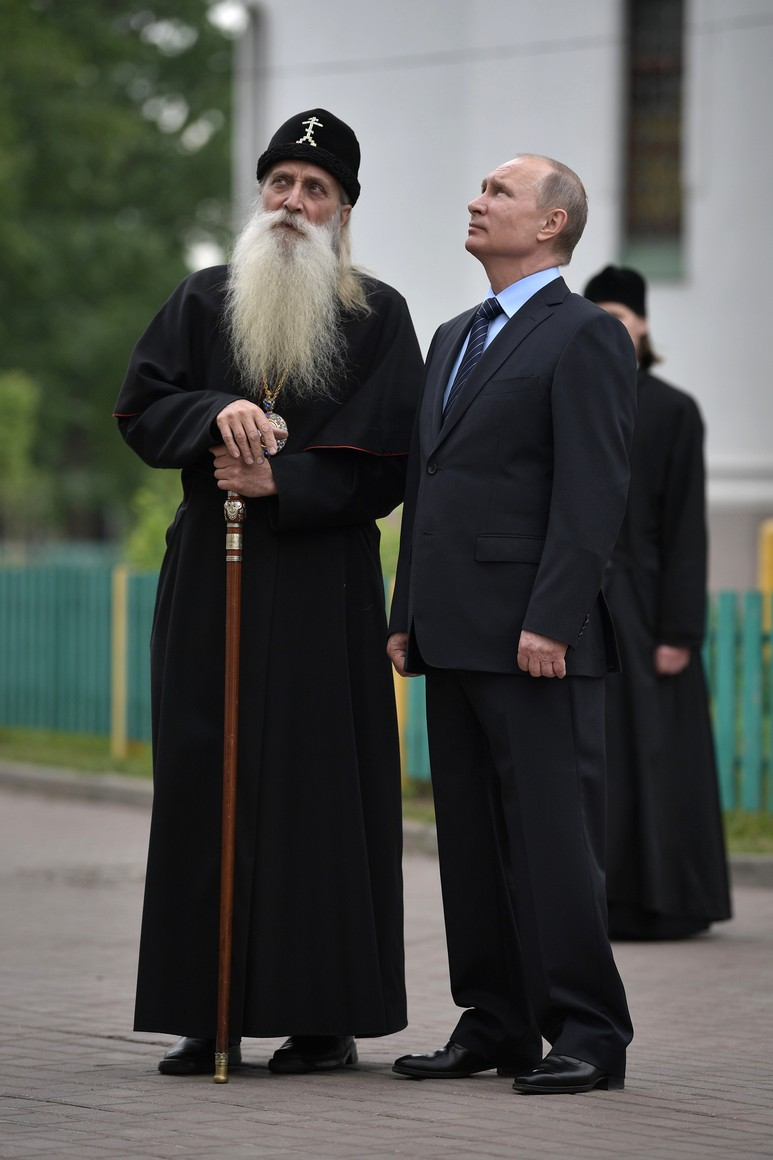
Metropolitan Cornelius with Vladimir Putin at the Rogozhsky Spiritual Center of the Russian Orthodox Old-Rite Church. May 31, 2017

During this period, Metropolitan Cornelius actively visits communities in the regions and often meets with representatives of local municipal authorities and the press. Representatives of the Russian Orthodox Old-Rite Church began to take part in various cultural, historical, spiritual and educational events. Conferences, round tables, exhibitions, and educational lectures are held on an ongoing basis in the Russian Orthodox Old-Rite Church. Book publishing has increased. Old Believers (and some non-Old Believers) authors and scientists were involved. The efforts of Metropolitan Cornelius to establish closer relations with the state authorities were crowned with success. Local authorities in Russia, to a greater extent than before, assist Old Believer communities in the restoration of churches, the allocation of land for the new construction of religious buildings. Representatives of the Old Believer communities and the diocese, along with delegates from other faiths, are members of regional councils for interaction with religious organizations. On February 22, 2013, Russian President Vladimir Putin awarded Metropolitan Cornelius the Order of Friendship. In his reply, Metropolitan Cornelius said: "In this high award, I see not so much an appreciation of my modest merits, as a recognition by the state of the merits of the entire Russian Old Believers to their Fatherland in preserving the spiritual wealth of Holy Russia". On July 28, 2014, during his visit to Altai, Metropolitan Cornelius met with the Governor of Altai Krai, Alexander Karlin, in Barnaul. On May 27, Metropolitan Cornelius met in Vladimir with Svetlana Orlova, Governor of the Vladimir Oblast. On July 22, Acting President of Tatarstan Rustam Minnikhanov received Metropolitan Cornelius at his residence in the Kazan Kremlin. On March 16, 2017, Metropolitan Cornelius held an official meeting with Russian President Vladimir Putin, which was the first official meeting of its kind in the centuries-old history of the Old Believers. During the meeting, the upcoming celebration of the 400th anniversary of the birth of Protopop Avvakum and the reconstruction of architectural monuments in the main celebration centers - at the Rogozhsky and Preobrazhensky cemeteries in Moscow, interaction with compatriots abroad and the return of the Russian Orthodox Church of the Intercession and Assumption of the Mother of God in Maly Gavrikov Lane in Moscow were discussed. On May 31, 2017, President Vladimir Putin visited the Rogozhsky Administrative and Spiritual Center. The President visited the Church of the Nativity of Christ, the Pokrovsky Cathedral, the Icon Museum in the House of the Clergy, after which he communicated with Metropolitan Cornelius, later called this visit historic and noted that "the head of state visited the spiritual center of the Orthodox Old Believer Church for the first time after the church schism". On May 25, Sergei Kiriyenko, First Deputy Head of the Presidential Administration, paid a working visit to Rogozhskoye. On June 1, 2017, Moscow Mayor Sergei Sobyanin visited the spiritual center of the Russian Orthodox Church to congratulate Metropolitan Cornelius on Name Day. On August 1, a meeting with Chairman of the State Duma Vyacheslav Volodin took place at the Rogozhsky residence. On August 16, 2017, Russian Minister of Culture Vladimir Medinsky visited the Rogozhsky Spiritual Center.

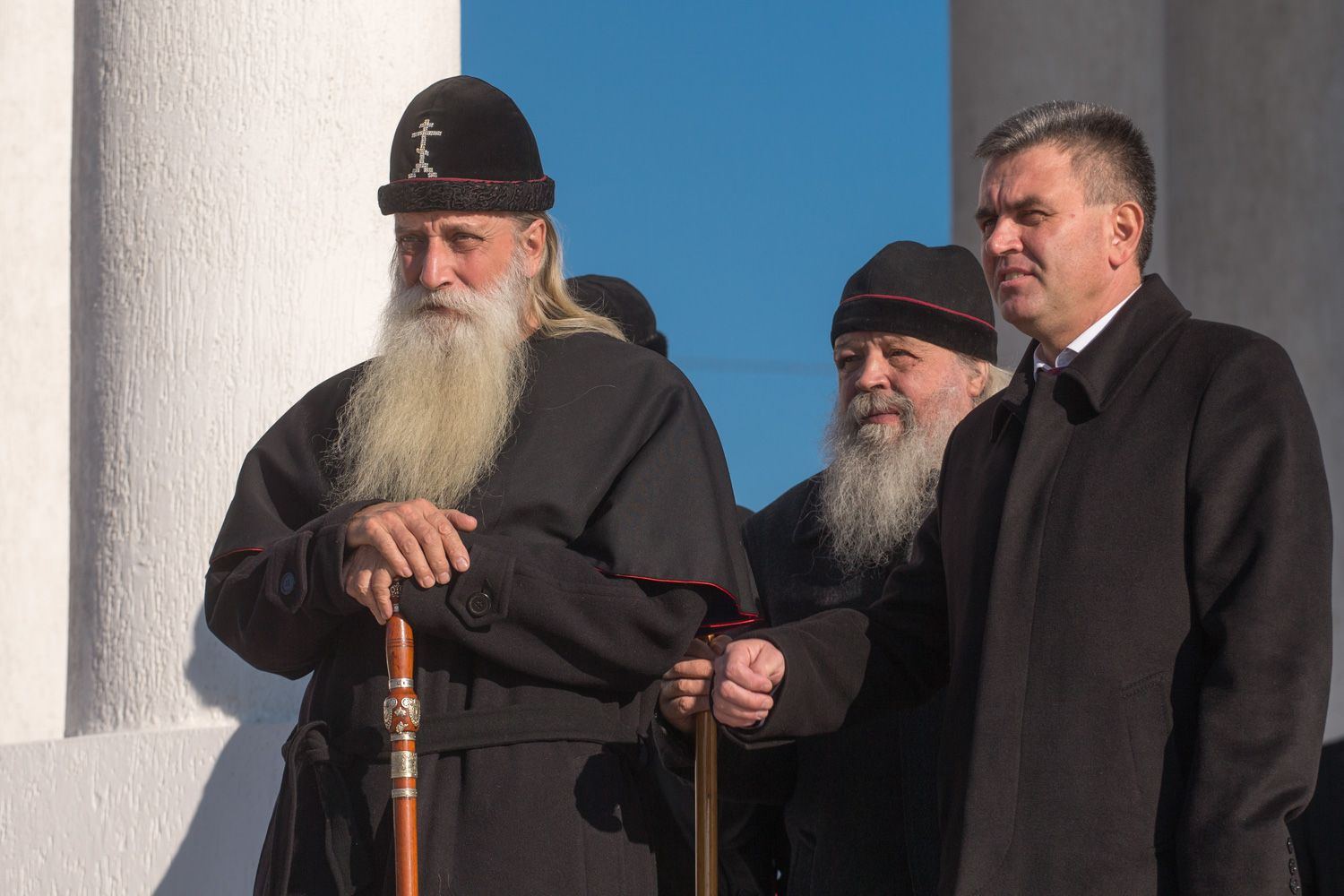
Metropolitan Cornelius (left) with Bishop Eumenius (Mikheyev) of Chișinău and all Moldova (center) and President of Transnistria Vadim Krasnoselsky (right), during the Metropolitan's visit in Transnistria

== Positions ==
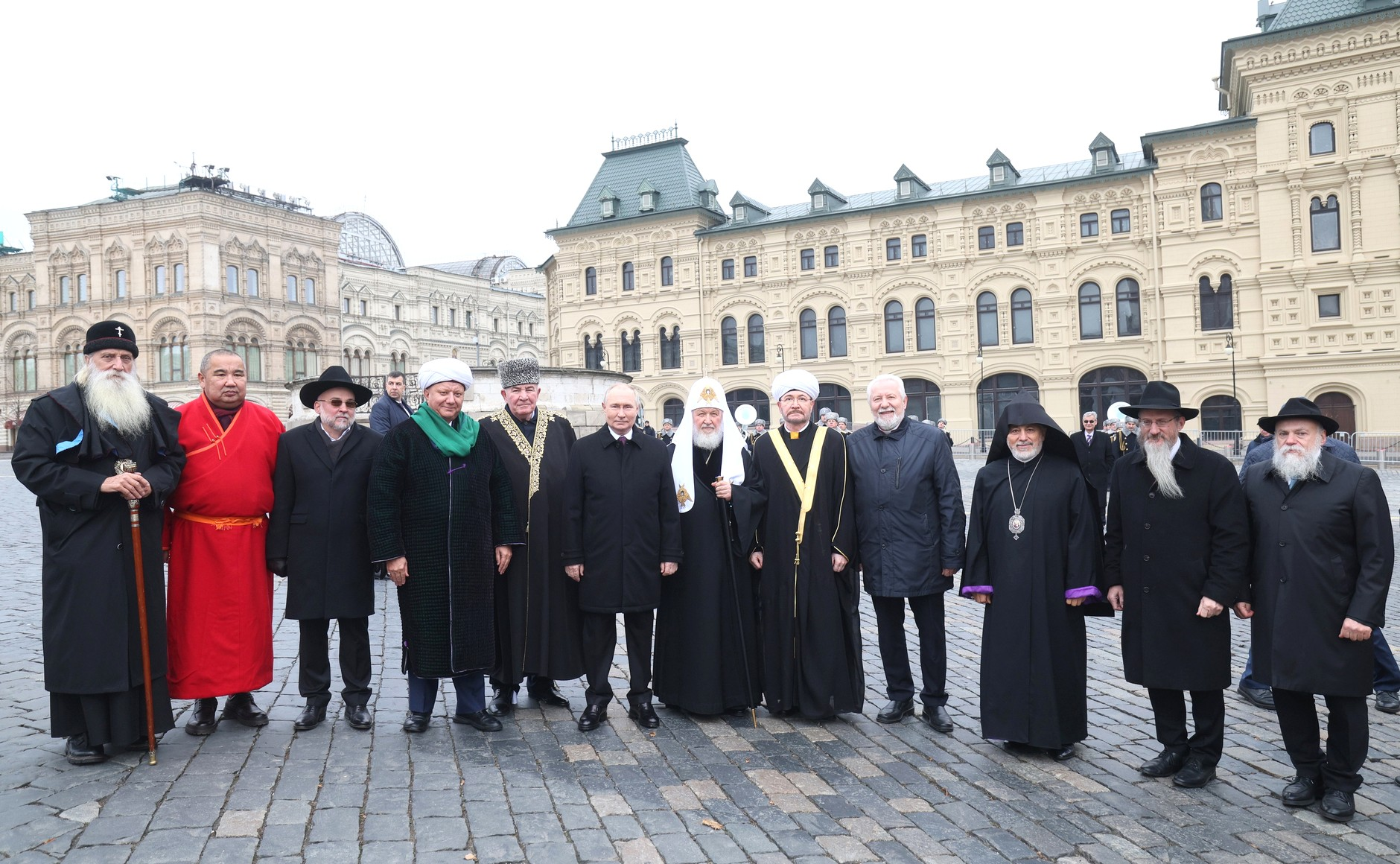
Putin with Metropolitan Cornelius and other pro-Kremlin religious leaders during National Unity Day celebrations on 4 November 2023

In early March 2022, Cornelius openly supported the Russian invasion of Ukraine and endorsed the actions of the Russian army. He repeated Russian state propaganda that in Ukraine people would get killed only for thinking and speaking Russian. Cornelius called on the Ukrainian side to lay down their arms and "stop the genocide, the madness". After that the Archdiocese of Kiev and All Ukraine withdrew from the subordination of the Metropolinate of Moscow. On April 3, 2022, it appealed to the primates of the Metropolinate of Moscow and Metropolitanate of Belaya Krinitsa with a request to grant autocephaly.
