= Gregory (Korobeynikov) =

Russian Eastern Orthodox bishop of the Russian Orthodox Old-Rite Church

- Bishop of Tomsk-Yenisei
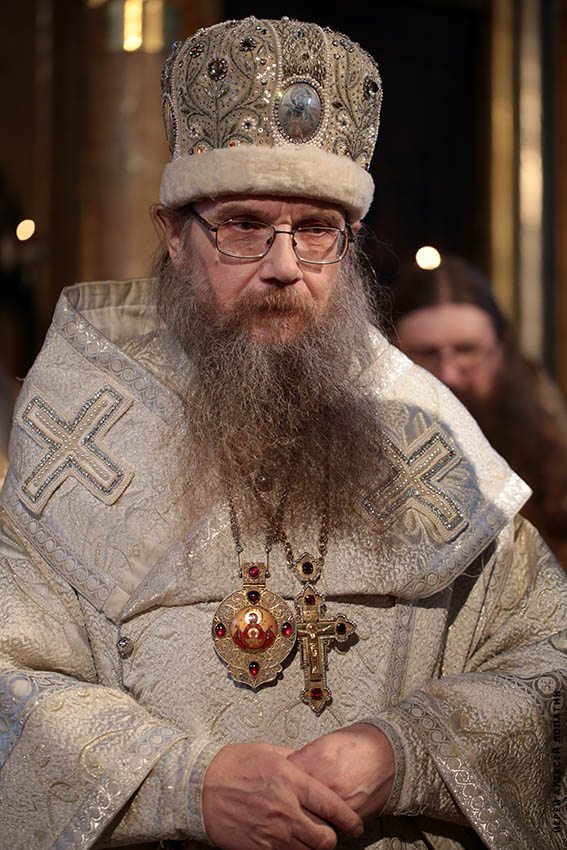
- Bishop Gregory in October 2015
- Native name: Григорий

Personal details
- Born: Gennady Vasilyevich Korobeinikov; October 9, 1948 (age 77) Chernaya Rechka, Kambarsky District, Udmurt ASSR, Soviet Union
- Spouse: Anna Zadvornova (1971–2014, her death)
- Children: 9

Bishop Gregory (Russian: Григорий, secular name Gennady Vasilyevich Korobeinikov, Russian: Геннадий Васильевич Коробейников; born 9 October 1948) is a bishop in the Russian Orthodox Old-Rite Church (RORC). He has been the Old Believer bishop of Tomsk since 2015.

== Personal life ==
Korobeynikov was born into a large family of Old Believers who were peasant farmers in the small town of Chernaya Rechka about 79 km from Izhevsk. He was the youngest of nine children. In his youth most of his family moved to the city of Izhevsk, where he graduated from high school, and later attended the Sarapul College of Food Industry. After serving in the Soviet Army, he returned to the city of Izhevsk, where he worked at a factory, being a member of the Izhevsk Old Believer community of the Protection of the Holy Virgin. In 1971 he married Anna Zadvornova in Novosibirsk. The two had 9 children and 28 grandchildren. His wife died on 25 December 2014.

== Religious life ==
=== Priesthood ===
On 22 May 1976, Korobeynikov was ordained priest for permanent service in the city of Saratov by Archbishop Nicodemus (Latyshev), and in June 1976 he moved to the city with his wife and four children. At the same time, he served as pastor of the old-rite parishes in the village of Pristan and visited the Old Believers of the city of Sverdlovsk and the surrounding region. In 1986, by decree of the Archbishop Alimpiy (Gusev), Korobeynikov was transferred to permanent service in the Assumption community of the city of Tomsk and moved there in November of that year.

On 7 April 1993, on the Eastern Orthodox feast of the Annunciation of the Most Holy Theotokos, Korobeynikov was elevated to the rank of archpriest of the old-rite Orthodox church by Bishop Siluyan (Kilin), who said that Korobeynikov had displayed "tireless work for the good of the Church." He was assigned to the pastoral care of the Old Believer communities in eastern Siberia, including Novokuznetsk, Kemerovo, Krasnoyarsk, Kyzyl, as well as Transbaikalia and Kamchatka.

Because of the rule regarding clerical celibacy in the old-rite Orthodox Church, Korobeynikov could not become a bishop in the Church. However, after the death of his wife in December 2014, he then became eligible as he was then in state of celibacy. At the synod of the Old Believer bishops from 29 to 30 April 2015, the synod discussed the candidates for the position of bishop; it was decided by Archbishop Cornelius (Titov) to ask Bishop Siluyan to make a monastic tonsure to Archpriest Gennady Korobeiniko) and to consecrate the latter as bishop.

=== Bishop ===
On 14 September 2015, Korobeynikov received the monastic tonsure and was bestowed the name Gregory by the bishop of Kazan and Vyatka Euthymius (Dubinov) in the Church of the Assumption in the city of Tomsk. From 21 to 23 in October 2015 in Moscow, the hierarchy of the Russian Orthodox Old-Rite Church took the initiative to recreate the Tomsk diocese as separate from the Novosibirsk diocese and to appoint Gregory (Korobeynikov) as bishop. Aside from the city of Tomsk, the new diocese also included the parishes of the Tomsk and Kemerovo regions, Krasnoyarsk Territory, Khakassia and Tuva. On 31 October 2015 in Tomsk, Cornelius (Titov) intronized the newly appointed Bishop Gregory (Korobeynikov).

The Holy Synod of RORC which took place on October 17–19, 2017, "taking into account the territorial and historical features," renamed the Tomsk diocese into the Tomsk-Yenisei diocese, and the title of Bishop Gregory (Korobeynikov) was also changed.

On 1 February 2018, by decree of the Synod of the Metropolis of the RORC, Gregory (Korobeynikov) was appointed rector of the reestablished Cheremshan Monastery.

On 16 October 2018, by decision of the Holy Synod of the RORC, he was appointed locum tenens of the Far Eastern Diocese.
