= Kostino, Orekhovo-Zuyevsky District, Moscow Oblast =

Rural locality in Orekhovo-Zuyevsky District, Moscow Oblast, Russia

Coordinates: 55°34.885′N 38°49.41′E

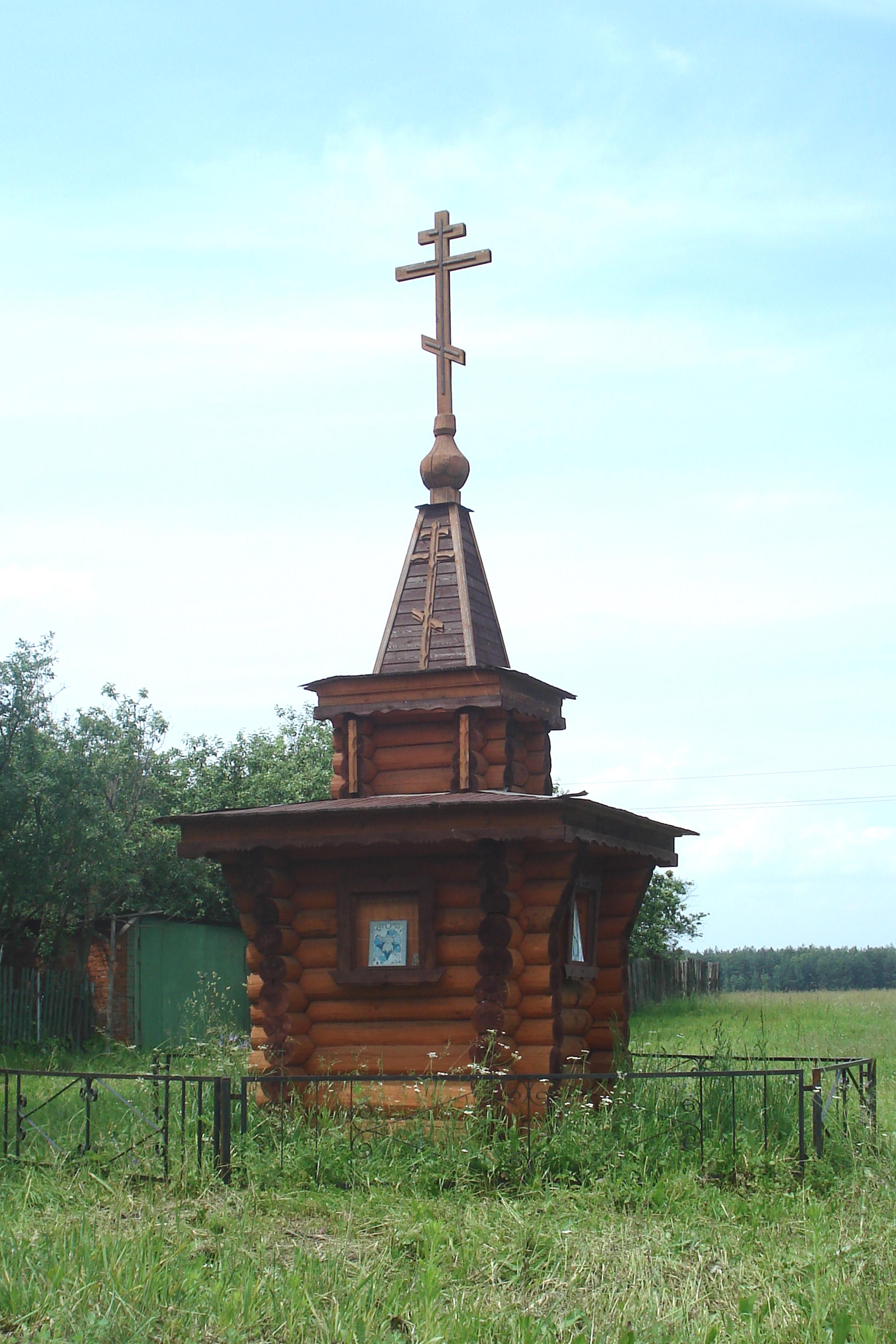
Kostino. Old Believers' Chapel

Kostino (Russian: Ко́стино) is a village in Orekhovo-Zuyevsky District of Moscow Oblast, Russia, located 75 kilometers (47 mi) south-east of Moscow near the Likhocha River.

Municipally, the village is a part of Davydovsky Rural Settlement (the administrative center of which is the village of Davydovo). Population: 185 (1997 est.). Postal code: 142642.

== History ==
The village is located in the historical area of Zakhod (a part of Guslitsa). In the 19th century, it was a part of Zaponorskaya Volost of Bogorodsky Uyezd of Moscow Governorate. The overwhelming majority of the population of Kostino were Old Believers, who from the end of the 19th century were guided by the Russian Orthodox Old-Rite Church.

In 1862, there was already an Old Believers' chapel in the village.

Before the Revolution, guslyaki (residents of Guslitsa) were known for their criminal tendencies and a propensity for horse-stealing. A large number of horse thieves were from Yelizarovo and Kostino. Stolen horses were usually sold in nearby Yegoryevsk, which at the time was a part of Ryazan Governorate and thus not in jurisdiction of the Moscow Governorate's police.

== Population ==
In 1825, the village consisted of 84 homesteads comprising 843 inhabitants (408 male and 435 female). By 1862, the population increased slightly to 89 homesteads comprising 965 people (482 male and 483 female). By 1925, the population grew to 125 households comprising 618 inhabitants. As of January 1, 1997, the population was 185.
