= Nikita Korobov =

Russian footballer

Personal information
- Full name: Nikita Valeryevich Korobov
- Date of birth: 5 September 1999 (age 27)
- Place of birth: Davydovo, Russia
- Height: 1.73 m (5 ft 8 in)
- Position: Midfielder

Youth career
- –2013: FC Grand Kurovskoye
- 2013–2017: FC Znamya Truda Orekhovo-Zuyevo

Senior career*
Years	Team	Apps	(Gls)
2017	FC Grand Kurovskoye		
2018–2019	FC Saturn-2 Ramenskoye (amateur)		
2019–2021	FC Saturn Ramenskoye	44	(3)
2021–2022	FC Tom Tomsk	29	(0)
2022–2023	FC Kaluga	31	(1)
2023	SC Astrakhan	12	(0)
2024	FC Lada-Tolyatti	6	(0)
- * Club domestic league appearances and goals as of 6 July 2024

Nikita Valeryevich Korobov (Russian: Никита Валерьевич Коробов; born 5 September 1999) is a Russian football player.

== Club career ==
He made his debut in the Russian Football National League for FC Tom Tomsk on 11 July 2021 in a game against FC Metallurg Lipetsk.
