= Uglich =

Town in Yaroslavl Oblast, Russia

Uglich Углич
- Town
- Bogojavlienskij monastery

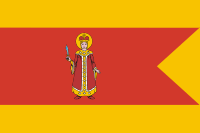
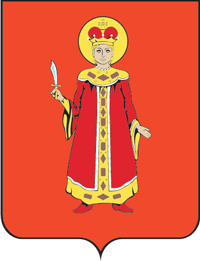
- Flag Coat of arms
- Interactive map of Uglich
- Location of Uglich Uglich (Europe) Uglich (Russia)
- Coordinates: 57°32′N 38°20′E
- Country: Russia
- Federal subject: Yaroslavl Oblast
- Founded: 937 or 1148

Government
  - Body: Municipal Council
  - Mayor: Eleanora Sheremetyeva

Area
  - Total: 26.6 km^{2} (10.3 sq mi)
- Elevation: 120 m (390 ft)

Population (2010 Census)
  - Total: 34,507
  - Estimate (2017): 32,146 (−6.8%)
  - Density: 1,300/km^{2} (3,360/sq mi)

Administrative status
  - Subordinated to: town of oblast significance of Uglich
  - Capital of: Uglichsky District, town of oblast significance of Uglich

Municipal status
  - Municipal district: Uglichsky Municipal District
  - Urban settlement: Uglich Urban Settlement
  - Capital of: Uglichsky Municipal District, Uglich Urban Settlement
- Time zone: UTC+3 (MSK)
- Postal code: 152610
- Dialing code: +7 48532
- OKTMO ID: 78646101001
- Website: www.uglich.ru

Uglich (Russian: У́глич, IPA: [ˈuɡlʲɪtɕ]) is a historic town in Yaroslavl Oblast, Russia, located on the Volga River. Population: 34,507 (2010 census); 38,260 (2002 census); 39,975 (1989 Soviet census).

== History ==
The city was first documented in 1148 as Ugliche Pole (Corner Field). The town's name is thought to allude to the nearby turn in the Volga River, and is derived from the Russian word ugol (a corner, a nook).

=== Principality of Uglich ===
From 1218 until 1328, Uglich was the seat of a small princedom. At that time, the local princes sold their rights to the great prince of Moscow. Uglich was a border town of the Grand Duchy of Moscow, and it was burned several times in conflicts by Lithuanians, Tatars, and the grand prince of Tver.

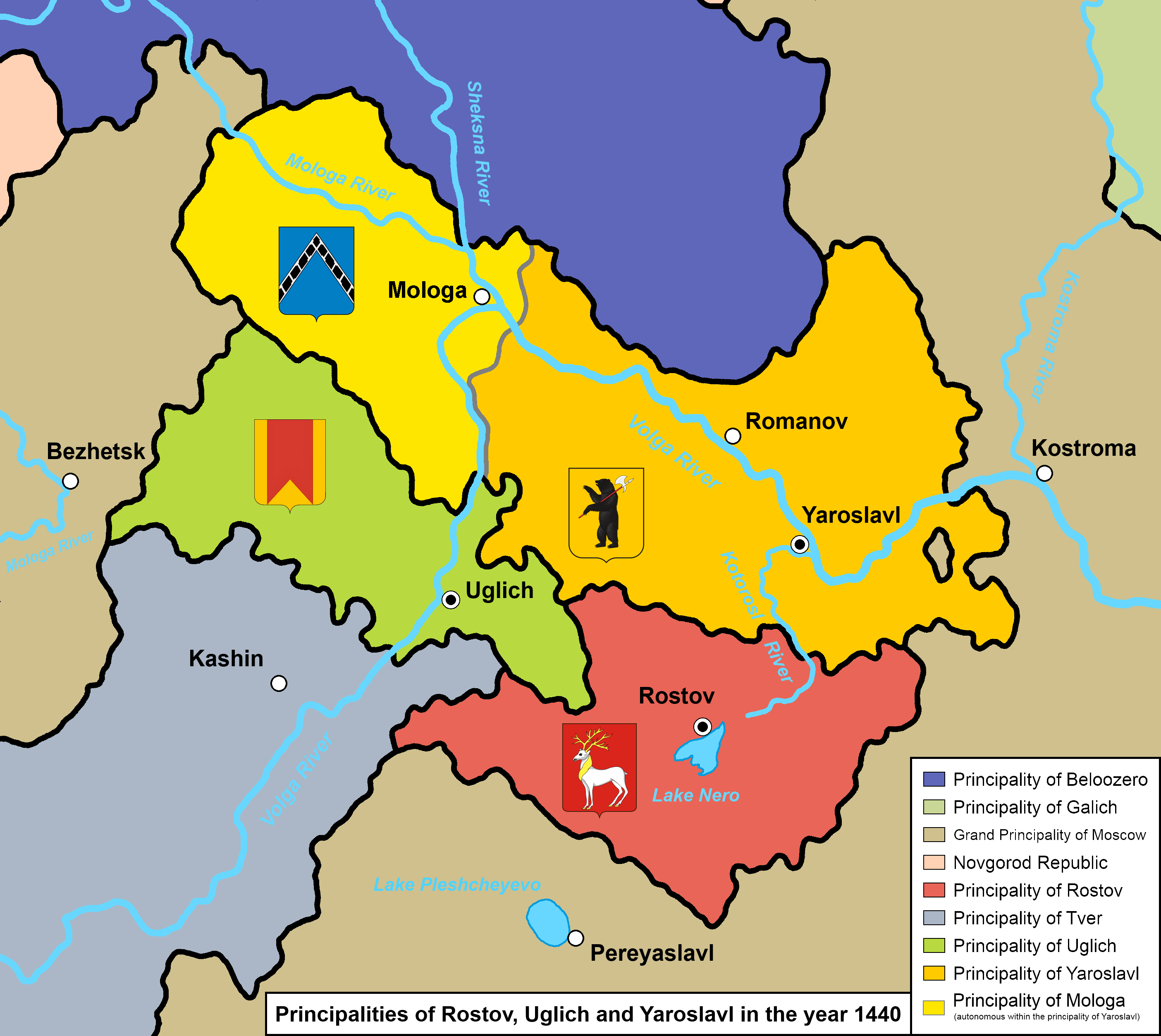
The Principality of Uglich (c. 1440)

Grand Duke Ivan III of Moscow gave the town in 1462 to his younger brother Andrey Bolshoy (Andrey the Great). During Andrey's reign, the town was expanded and the first stone buildings were constructed. Particularly notable were the cathedral (rebuilt in 1713), the Intercession Monastery (destroyed by the Bolsheviks in the early 20th century as part of the Uglich water reservoir), and the red-brick palace of the prince (completed in 1481 and still standing).

=== Reign of Ivan the Terrible ===
During the reign of Ivan the Terrible, the town passed to his only brother, Yury. Local inhabitants helped the Tsar capture the city of Kazan by building a wooden fortress that was transported via the Volga all the way to Kazan. Throughout the 16th century, Uglich prospered both politically and economically, but thereafter its fortunes began to decline.

=== Death of Tsarevich Dmitry ===
After Ivan's death, his youngest son Dmitry Ivanovich was banished to Uglich in 1584. The most well-known event in the town's history took place on May 15, 1591, when the 10-year-old boy was found dead with his throat cut in the palace courtyard. Suspicion immediately fell on the tsar's chief advisor, Boris Godunov. Official investigators concluded, however, that Dimitriy's death was an accident. They cut a "tongue" from the cathedral bell that rang the news of Dimitriy's death and "exiled" it to Siberia.

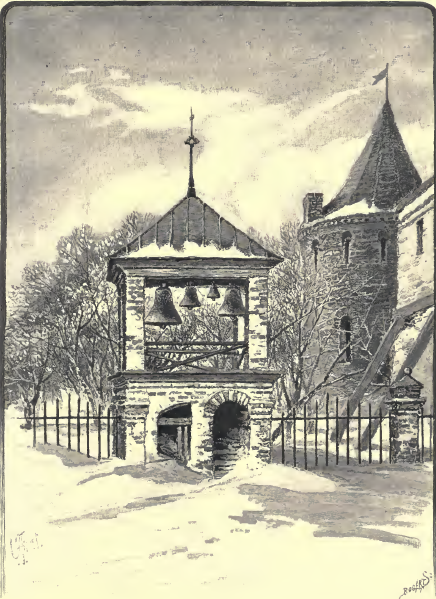
Exiled bells of Uglich in Tobolsk, 1885

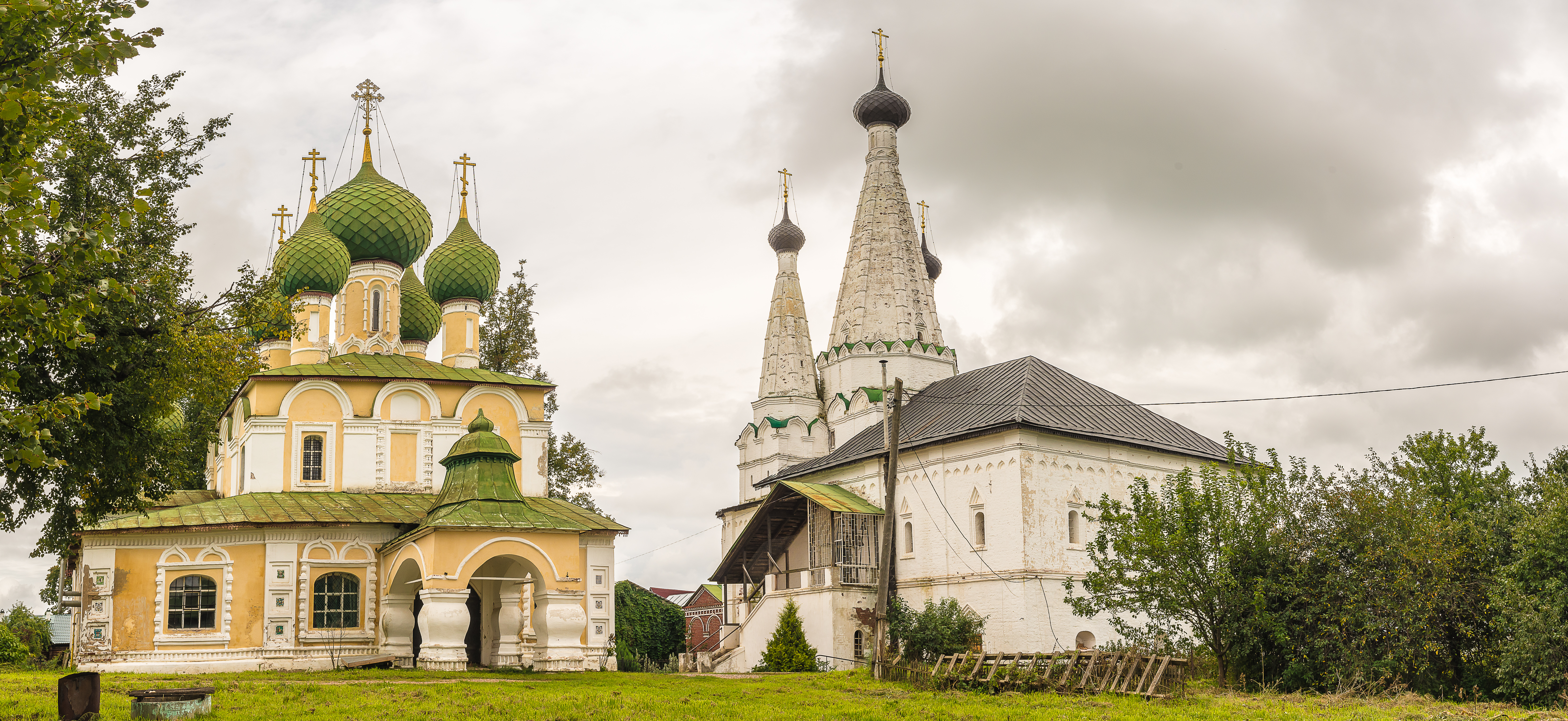
The Monastery of St. Alexis (1620s)

As Dimitry was the last scion of the ancient Rurik Dynasty, his death precipitated the dynastic and political crisis known as the Time of Troubles. People readily believed that Dmitry was alive and supported several False Dmitrys (see False Dmitry I, False Dmitry II, False Dmitry III), who each tried to grab the Muscovite throne. During the Time of Troubles, Poles besieged the Alexeievsky and Uleima monasteries and burned them down, killing all the populace who had sought refuge inside.

The Romanov Tsars quickly arranged to canonize the martyred Tsesarevich and to designate Uglich as a place of pilgrimage. On the spot where Dimitry was thought to have been murdered, the city in 1690 built a small Church of St. Demetrios on the Blood. Its red walls and blue domes are visible as travelers go north on the Volga. The palace where the prince lived was turned into a museum. The image of Tsesarevich with a knife in his hand was adopted as the town's coat of arms.

=== Later history ===
In the first third of the 18th century, the kremlin cathedral and its remarkable bell tower were demolished and rebuilt. Other 18th-century landmarks include the Smolenskaya, Korsunskaya, Kazanskaya and Bogoyavlenskaya churches. The most important edifice of the 19th century is the cathedral of the Theophany Convent, consecrated in 1853.

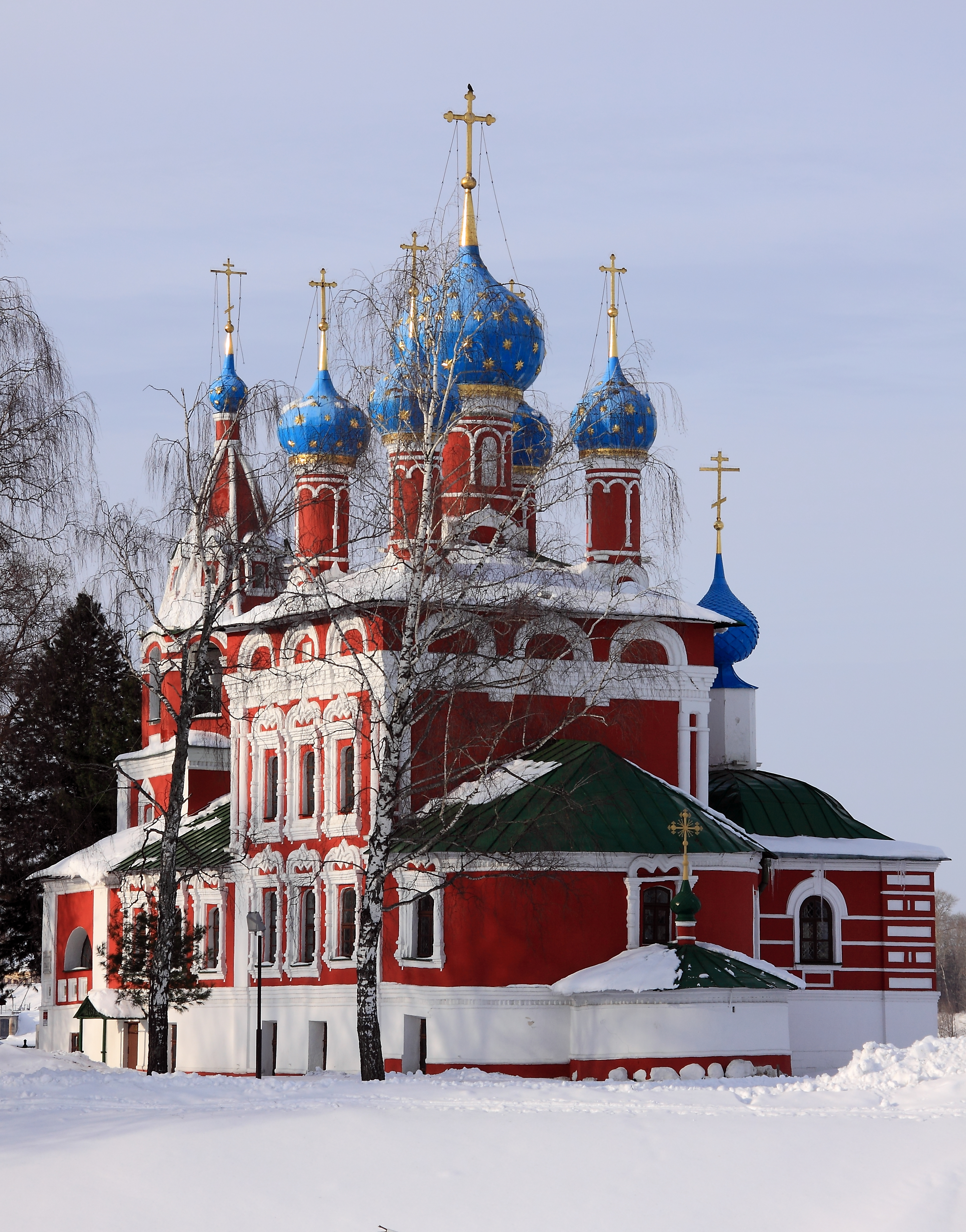
Church of Tsarevich Dmitry on the Blood (1692)

Infrastructure improvements included a railway station, connecting residents to transportation via other routes than the river. A watch manufacturing plant operated in the 20th-century town, making Chaika watches; this has since closed. A hydroelectric power station was built under Stalin's reign to generate power from the Volga. But development of the dam and Uglich Reservoir resulted in severe flooding of the town's outskirts. In November 2008 the Nexans cable mill opened.

== Administrative and municipal status ==
Within the framework of administrative divisions, Uglich serves as the administrative center of Uglichsky District, although it is independent of it. As an administrative division, it is incorporated separately as the "town of oblast significance of Uglich"—an administrative unit with the status equal to that of the districts. As a municipal division, the town of oblast significance of Uglich is incorporated within Uglichsky Municipal District as Uglich Urban Settlement.

== Architecture ==
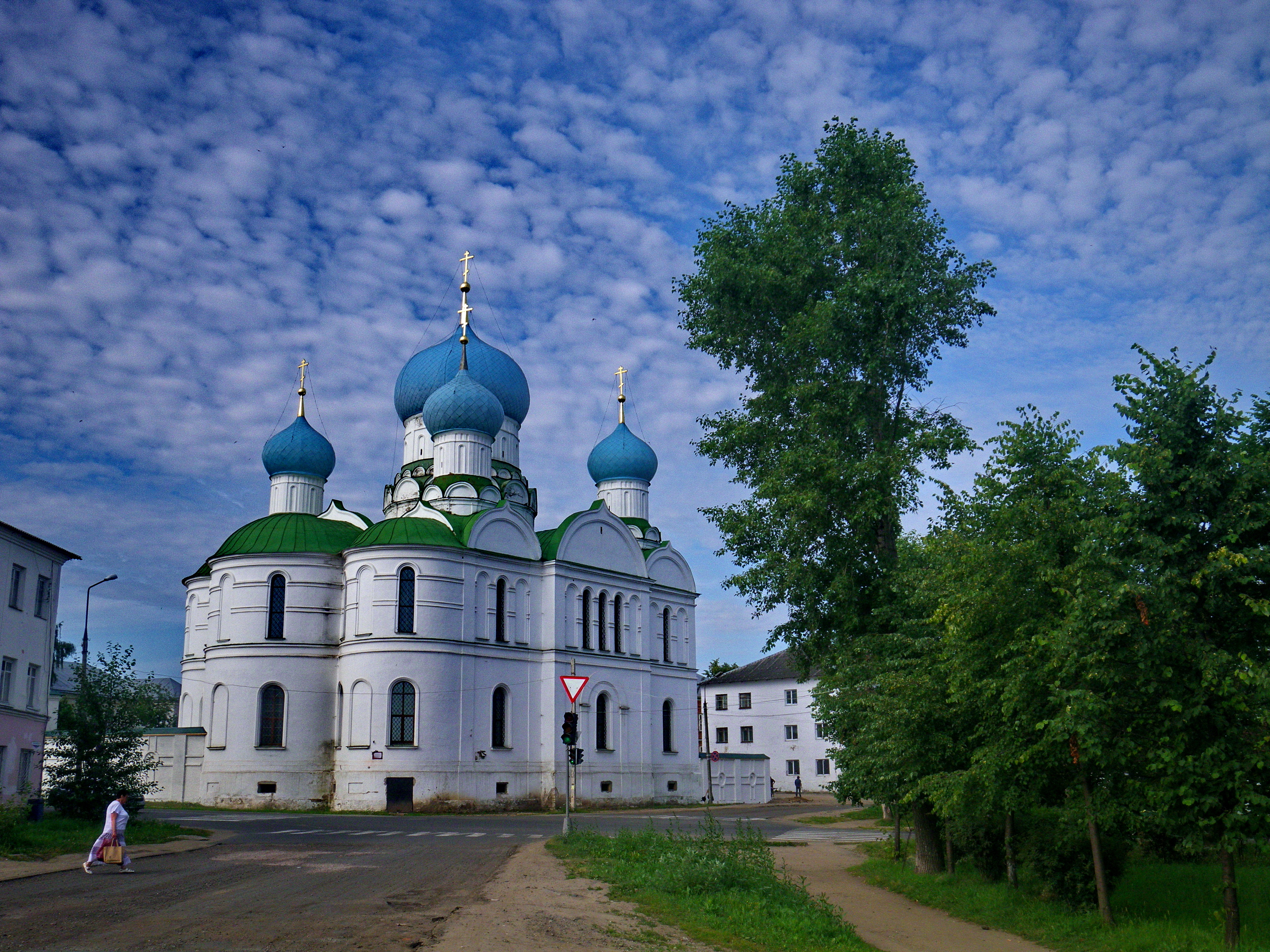
The Bogoyavlensky Monastery

Apart from the kremlin, the city center features other examples of historic Russian architecture. Particularly notable are the Alexeievsky and Resurrection monasteries. The Assumption three-tented church (1628) of the Alexeyevsky Monastery is considered a gem of Russian medieval architecture. The common people said this church was "Marvelous", and that qualifier became part of its official name. Located nearby is the more conventional Church of St. John the Baptist (1681).

Closer to the bank of the Volga is the Resurrection Monastery with a huge cathedral, refectory, belfry, and summer church. All these buildings stand in a row and date to 1674–77. Opposite the monastery is the graceful Church of the Nativity of St. John the Baptist. It was built in 1689-90 by a local merchant to commemorate the spot where his son had drowned.

More historic architecture may be seen in the vicinity of Uglich, including the 17th-century Uleima Monastery and a fine church in Divnogorye.

== Notable people ==
- Vitalii Lazorkin (1945–2021), Ukrainian serviceman, scientist, public figure, colonel of the Armed Forces of Ukraine.
- Alexander Oparin (1894–1980), biochemist notable for his book The Origin of Life, was born in Uglich.
