= Gora (Davydovskoye Rural Settlement), Orekhovo-Zuyevsky District, Moscow Oblast =

Rural locality in Moscow Oblast, Russia

Coordinates: 55°36.27′N 38°51.04′E

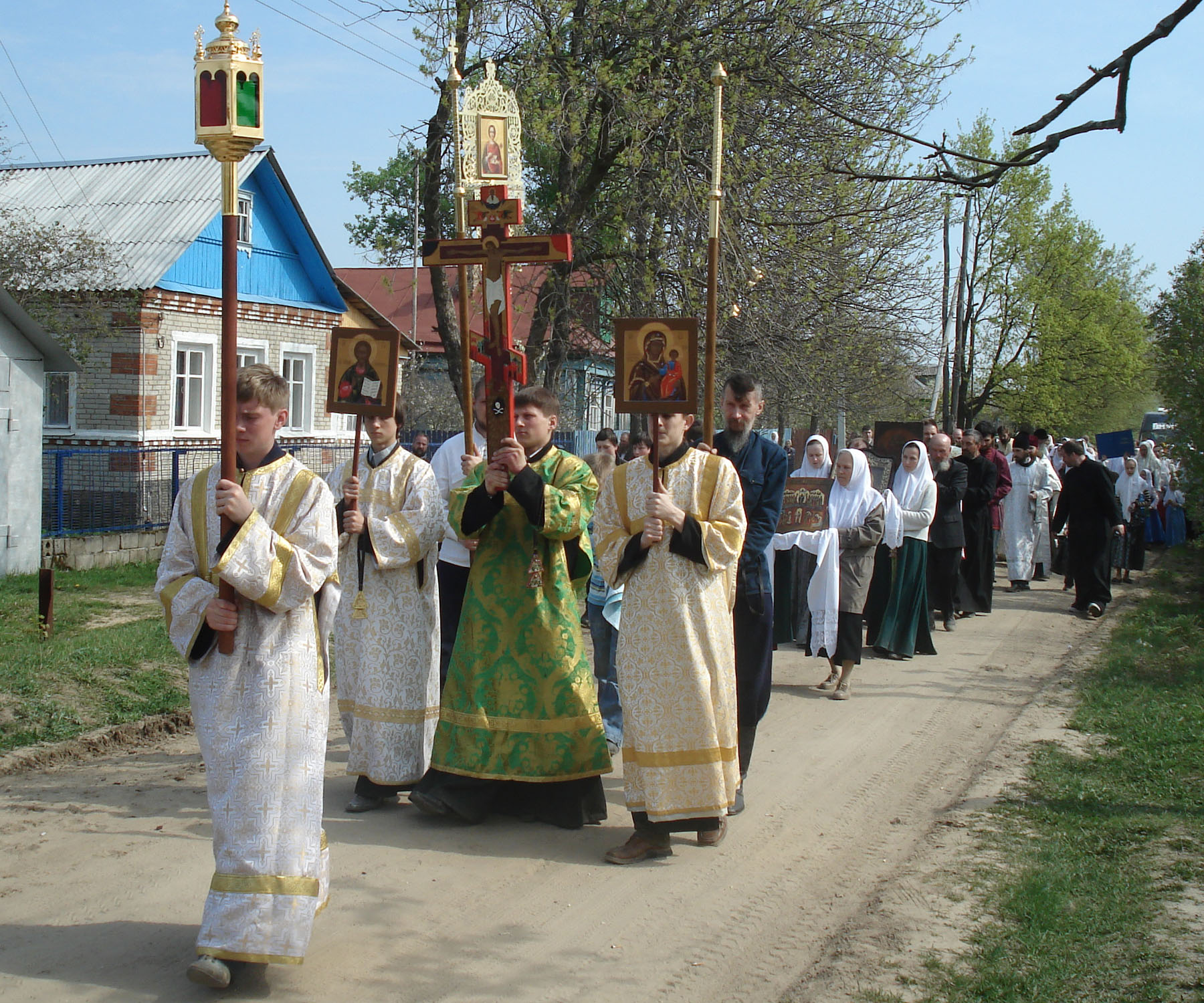
Old Believers' crucession in the village of Gora; May 2, 2008

Gora (Russian: Гора́) is a rural locality (a village) in Orekhovo-Zuyevsky District of Moscow Oblast, Russia, located some 75 kilometers (47 mi) south-east of Moscow.

Municipally, the village is a part of Davydovsky Rural Settlement (the administrative center of which is the village of Davydovo). Population: 145 (1997). Postal code: 142641.

== History ==
The village is located in the historical area of Zakhod (a part of Guslitsa). In the 19th century, it was a part of Zaponorskaya Volost of Bogorodsky Uyezd of Moscow Governorate. The overwhelming majority of the population of Gora were Old Believers, who from the end of the 19th century were guided by the Russian Orthodox Old-Rite Church.

As in many other Guslitsa's villages, iconography was a developed craft in Gora.

== Population ==
In 1852, the village consisted of 39 homesteads comprising 387 inhabitants (184 male and 203 female). By 1862, the population increased slightly to 46 homesteads comprising 389 people (188 male and 201 female). By 1925, the population of 74 homesteads comprised 398 inhabitants. As of January 1, 1997, the population was 145.
