= Chaika watches =

Russian watchmaking company

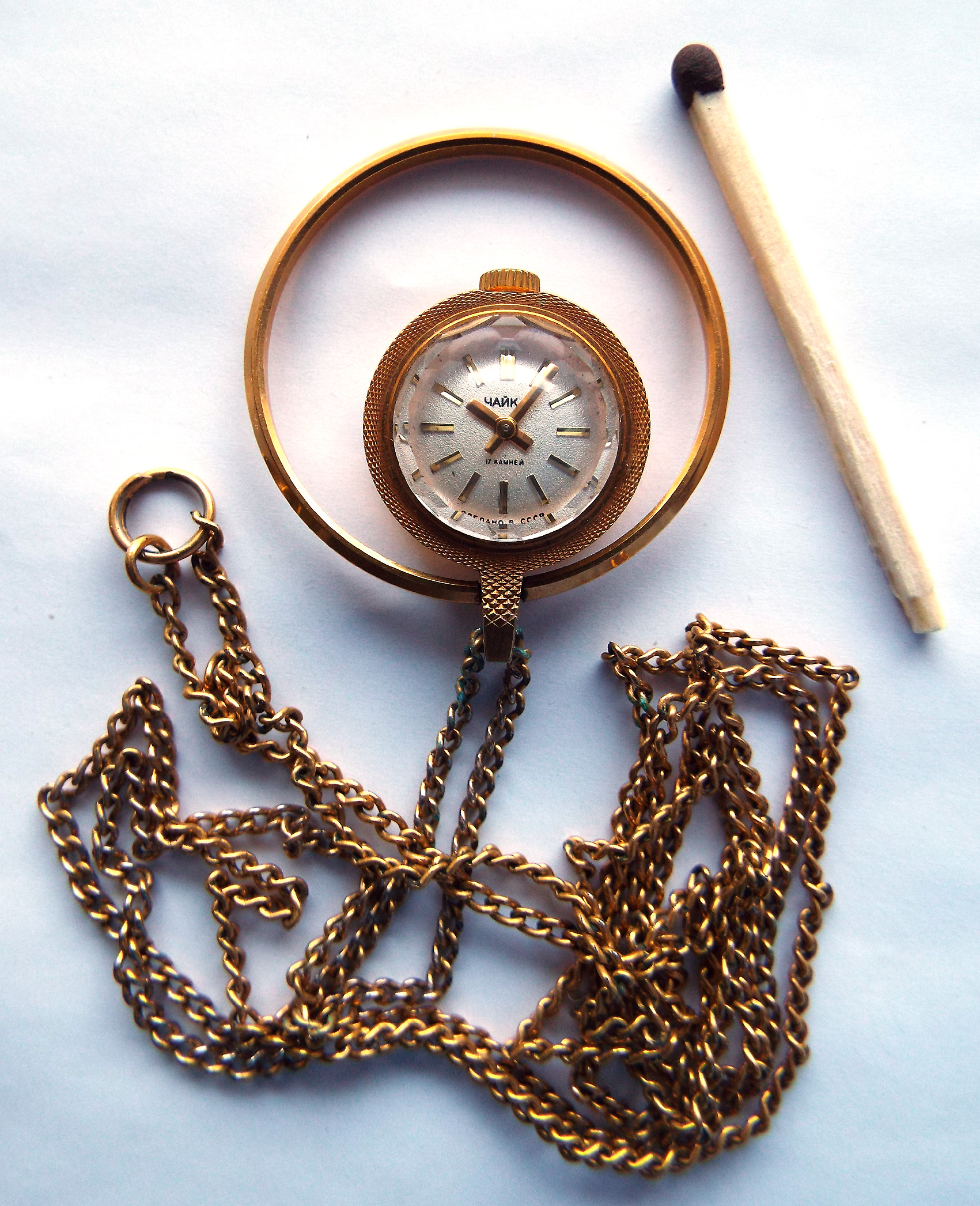
A Chaika gold-plated ladies pendant watch manufactured in 1977.

Chaika (Russian: чайка, meaning "gull") is a Russian watchmaking company in the town of Uglich. It started producing watches in the 1940s.

== History ==
The factory started with the production of movement parts and stones. Gradually the full-cycle production of watches and movements was organized. In the 1980s the factory produced more than 500,000 watches per year.

At the beginning of 2000 the factory started manufacturing Chaika watches in cases made of precious metals. Since 2006 the factory has completely switched to precious metal watches, such as gold (585, 750 fineness), silver (925 fineness), platinum (950 fineness) and palladium (850 fineness). Many models are encrusted with precious and semi-precious stones-diamonds, phianites, as well as colored natural stones. In addition to watches, the factory also produces a wide range of watch and decorative bracelets, chains, and coins. Currently, the Chaika watches continue to be produced at the Chaika Production Watch Factory located in Uglich.

== Today ==
Chaika Production is one of the few watchmaking companies in Russia where the full cycle of watch production is preserved: model development, external decoration production, equipment and accessories production. In addition Chaika cooperates with international partners regarding the production of watch movements and accessories. Watchmaking experts continue the traditions of Chaika in completely renovated and modern production buildings of the historical site of the factory built in 1937. Modern processing centers and high-precision equipment of the world's best manufacturers in Europe and Japan allow us to produce watches meeting the best up-to-date standards.

All watches use Chaika and the world's leading companies ETA, Ronda (Switzerland), Citizen Co. Ltd. (Japan) mechanisms.

Chaika's custom watches with symbols are in high demand among corporate clients.
