= Siluyan Kilin =

Russian archbishop (1939–2021)

Siluyan (Kilin)
- Archbishop of Novosibirsk
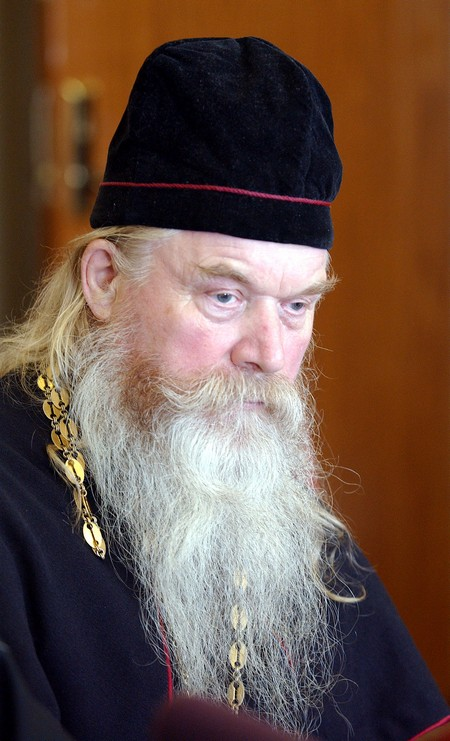
- Siluyan in 2004
- Native name: Силуян

Orders
- Rank: Archbishop

Personal details
- Born: Simon Afinogenovich Kilin; 15 May 1939 Podoinikovo, Pankrushikhinsky District, Altai Krai, Soviet Union
- Died: 5 November 2021 (aged 82) Novosibirsk, Russia

Archbishop Siluyan (Kilin) (Russian: Силуян (Килин), secular name Simon Afinogenovich Kilin, Russian: Си́мон Афиноге́нович Ки́лин; 15 May 1939 – 5 November 2021), was a bishop in the Russian Orthodox Old-Rite Church (RORC). He was the Old Believer archbishop of Novosibirsk from 2015 until his death.

== Personal life ==
Kilin was born in the village of Podoynikovo into a religious family of Old Believers. His grandfather was originally a member of the Bezpopovtsy sect which has no clergy, but later in life joined the Belokrinitskaya sect which does have a church hierarchy and became a priest. From 1958 to 1962, Kilin served as a radio engineer in the air defense forces on Sakhalin in the ranks of the Soviet army. In 1962 he married and from 1962 to 1966 he was a subdeacon with the bishop of Chișinău, Nicodemus (Latyshev).

== Religious life ==
=== As deacon and priest ===
On 24 December 1966, Kilin was ordained deacon by Bishop of Chisinau Nicodemus (Latyshev), and on 25 December he was ordained priest to the Intercession Church in Chisinau, where he served as rector.

In 1987 he was appointed rector of the church in the city of Minusinsk, Krasnoyarsk Krai, and dean of all Siberia and the Far East. Kilin later spoke about his experience, saying: "When Moscow entrusted me, first, as the dean, and then as the ruling bishop of the Siberian diocese, to oversee the development of spirituality in this vast territory [...] [from the Urals] to the Pacific Ocean, it was necessary to restore the territory from scratch. Back then, there were only a few parishes, including in Novosibirsk – historical, seasoned – and also a good number in Tomsk. Everything else was actually a wasteland and was developed by the forces of local Christians, beginning in 1992."

In 1990 he was elevated to the rank of archpriest. On 18 October 1992, Kilin received his monastic tonsure in Novosibirsk.

=== As bishop ===
On 18 October 1992, at the Cathedral of the Intercession, he was ordained bishop with the monastic name of Siluyan. The consecration was performed by the Metropolitan of Moscow and All Russia Alimpiy (Gusev), together with the Bishop of Kiev and All Ukraine, John (Vitushkin). Due to the rule on celibacy in the old-rite church, Siluyan's wife, Valentina, took monastic vows and took the name Barsanuphius, with the blessing of Metropolitan Alimpiy; she was appointed hegumenia of the Uleima Monastery. At the same time, Siluyan (Kilin) was assigned to the territory of the former Irkutsk-Amur and the entire Far East diocese.

After repeatedly visiting the Chita Oblast, Siluyan (Kilin) established the old believer parish of Saint Nicholas in the village of Dono, and planned in the future to establish another church in the name of the Holy Hieromartyr Habakkuk in the city of Chita. In 2000, he was entrusted with pastoral care of the RORC parish of the Holy Cross Exaltation in Australia.

In 2004, after the death of Metropolitan Alimpiy (Gusev), he was one of the candidates put forward at the Holy Synod of the RORC to become the next Metropolitan of Moscow of the RORC. Ultimately the council decided that Cornelius (Titov) would be the next metropolitan.

On 5 August 2005, the RORC Bishops' Court ruled that Siluyan should not be allowed to attend church liturgies due to purported canonical violations. The ban was lifted after Siluyan repented, and he was allowed to attend a funeral in Moscow with his fellow bishops. Speaking of the challenges of being a bishop in Siberia, Siluyan opined that there were not enough Old-rite priests in the area to cover all the parishes all the time, as in a territory as vast as Siberia, even by train or plane it could take several days for a priest to travel from one parish to another.

== Death ==
Archbishop Siluyan died on 5 November 2021 in Novosibirsk, Russia, aged 82.
