= Yelizarovo, Orekhovo-Zuyevsky District, Moscow Oblast =

Rural locality in Orekhovo-Zuyevsky District, Moscow Oblast

Coordinates: 55°36.59′N 38°49.44′E

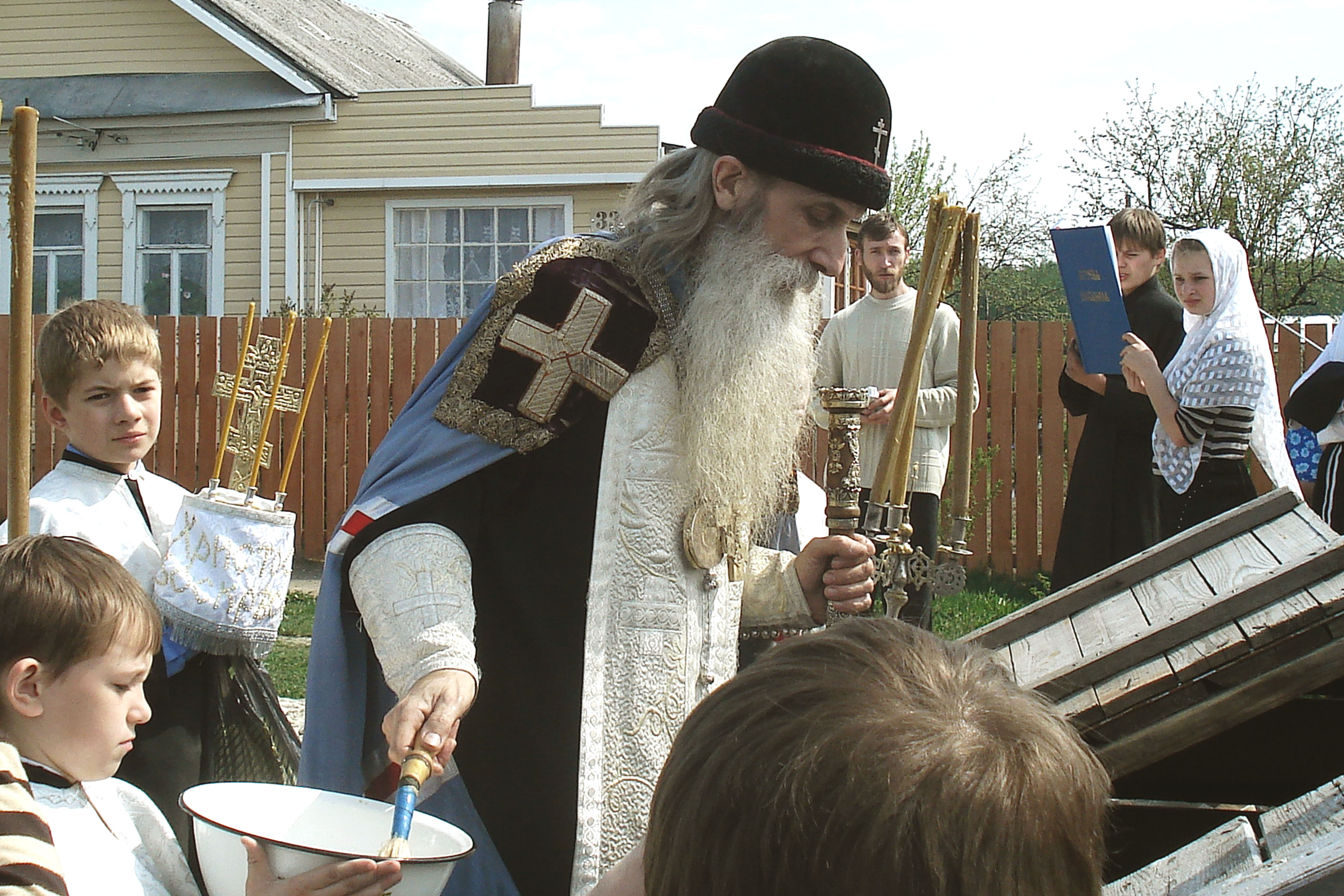
Metropolitan Kornily, the head of Russian Orthodox Old-Rite Church, consecrates a well. Yelizarovo, May 2, 2008

Yelizarovo (Russian: Елиза́рово) is a village in Orekhovo-Zuyevsky District of Moscow Oblast, Russia, located 75 kilometers (47 mi) south-east of Moscow, 1.5 kilometers (0.93 mi) west of Davydovo.

Municipally, the village is a part of Davydovsky Rural Settlement (the administrative center of which is the village of Davydovo). Population: 132 (1997 est.). Postal code: 142641.

== History ==
The village is located in the historical area of Zakhod (a part of Guslitsa). In the 19th century, it was a part of Zaponorskaya Volost of Bogorodsky Uyezd of Moscow Governorate. The overwhelming majority of the population of Yelizarovo were Old Believers, who from the end of the 19th century were guided by the Russian Orthodox Old-Rite Church.

In 1862, there was already an Old Believers' chapel in the village.

As in many other Guslitsa's villages, icon painting was a developed craft in Yelizarovo. An icon-painting workshop opened in Yelizarovo in the mid-19th century and stayed in operation until 1919. This workshop was linked to the workshops in Moscow, as well as to the icon-painters of Mstyora. At the All-Russia Exhibition of 1882 in Moscow, V. K. Chikalov's icon from Yelizarovo won a cash prize.

Before the Revolution, guslyaki (residents of Guslitsa) were known for their criminal tendencies and a propensity for horse-stealing. A large number of horse thieves were from Yelizarovo and Kostino. Stolen horses were usually sold in nearby Yegoryevsk, which at the time was a part of Ryazan Governorate and thus not in jurisdiction of the Moscow Governorate's police.

== Population ==
In 1852, the village consisted of 46 homesteads comprising 360 inhabitants (201 male and 159 female). By 1862, the population increased slightly to 53 homesteads comprising 391 people (189 male and 202 female). By 1925, the population grew to 96 households comprising 428 inhabitants. As of January 1, 1997, the population was 132.
