= Eumenius (Mikheyev) =

Russian Old Believer bishop (born 1942)

- Bishop of Chișinău and Moldova
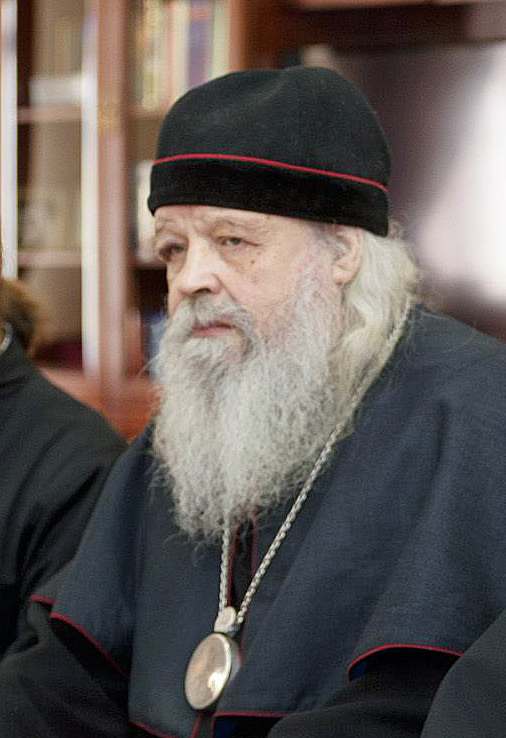
- Bishop Eumenius in November 2017
- Native name: Евмений

Orders
- Rank: Bishop

Personal details
- Born: Eugene Ivanovich Mikheev; May 17, 1942 (age 84) Kandalaksha, Kandalakshsky District, Murmansk Oblast, Soviet Union

Bishop Eumenius (Russian: Епископ Евмений, secular name Evgenу Ivanovich Mikheyev, Russian: Евгений Иванович Михеев; born 17 May 1942) is a bishop in the Russian Orthodox Old-Rite Church (RORC). He has been the Old Believer bishop of Chișinău and Moldova since 2005.

== Personal life ==
Mikheyev was born on 17 May 1942 in Kandalaksha, Murmansk region, in a family of Old Believers. His family has a history of clergymen, most prominent being his Peter Semenovich Mikheev, was dean of the Moscow region. In his early childhood was shaped by the fighting and aftermath of World War II, where many of his family members perished.

In 1954 at the age of 12 he moved to the village of Shuvoye in the Yegoryevsky District of the Moscow Oblast, where his grandmother Varvara Mikhailovna lived. By his own admission: "After the war, in Shuvoy, my peers and I went to the temple. And we did not feel any particular persecution at that time. Perhaps the reason was that the chairman of the village council was an Old Believer at that time, and that all the inhabitants of the village were Old Believers or came from [Old Believers] families. And all supported each other. And the secretary of the village council generally helped my grandfather in his affairs, helped with certificates when he needed to go somewhere to make a request."

At the end of high school in 1959 Mikheyev entered the Yegoryevsk professional school where he studied the profession of carpenter. He afterwards worked for several years at the factory in Shuvoy. Around this time he also visited Old-rite churches in Shuvoy and Yegoryevsk.

== Religious life ==
In 1967 he began working as psalmist for the Old Believer Church of the Nativity of the Most Holy Theotokos in Orekhovo-Zuev. In December 1967 he was ordained a lector in the church.

In 1968, Mikheyev married a woman named Evgenia Mikhailovna Kulikova, and later in that same year he was ordained a priest by Archbishop Nicodemus (Latyshev). For the next 38 years, he served pastor of a parish in Vereya. He also served at the Old-rite Moscow Cathedral in Rogozhsky, Moscow Oblast; he was originally only invited to serve there on a temporary basis by then bishop Anastasius (Kononov) but ended up coming to the parish for over 33 years.

In 1999, his wife died.

On 20 October 2004, at the Holy Synod of the Russian Orthodox Old-Rite Church, he was elected as candidate for the episcopacy, and on 21 October he was approved as a candidate for the vacant episcopal see of the diocese of Chișinău.

On 17 November 2004, in the Intercession Cathedral at the Rogozhsky Cemetery in Moscow, Bishop Sabbatius (Kozko) of Kiev and All Ukraine performed a monastic tonsure upon Mikheyev and bestowed Mikheyev with the name Eumenius.

On 2 January 2005, he was ordained bishop. On Saturday 5 February 2005, he arrived at the diocese of Chișinău.

== Views ==
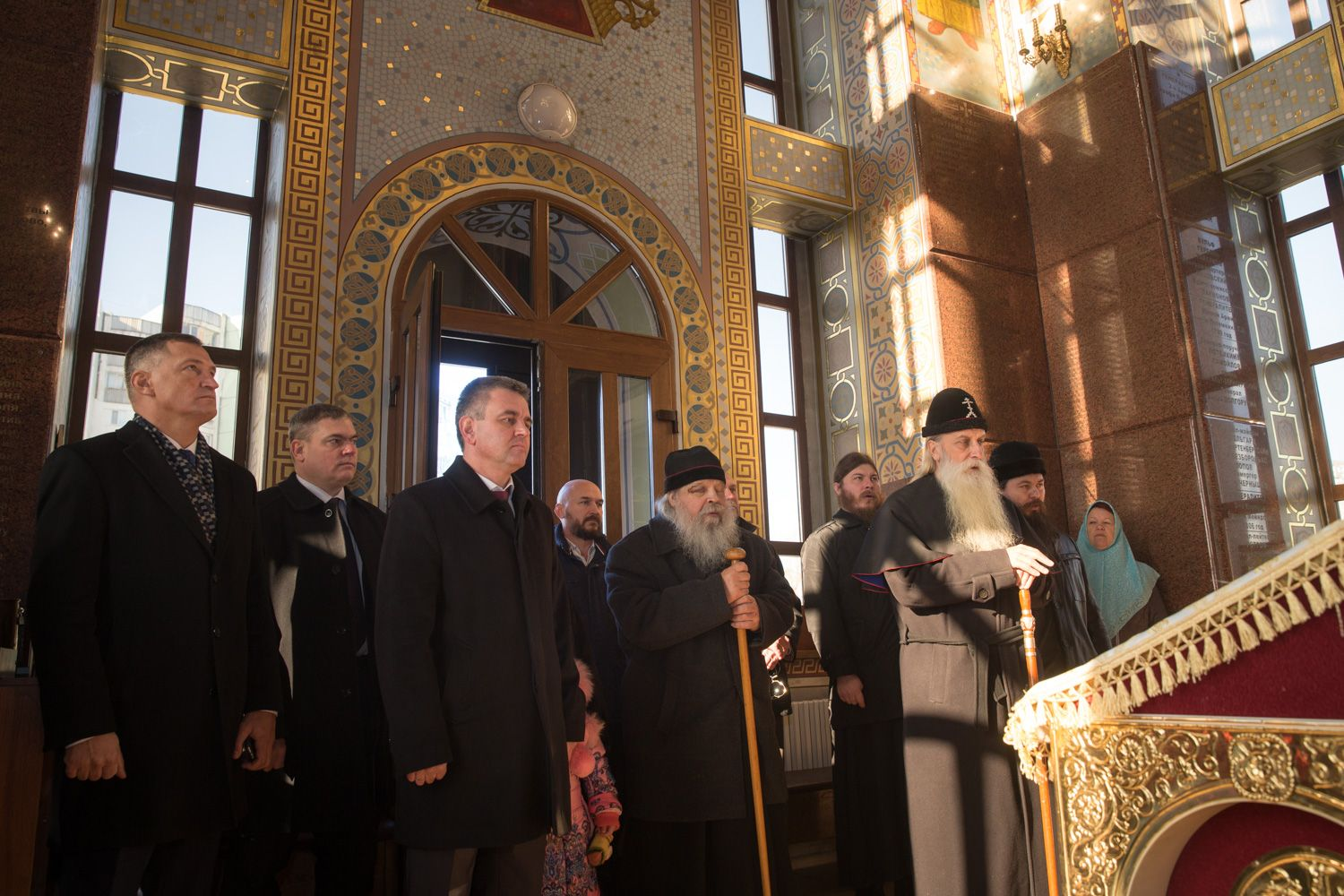
Bishop Eumenius (center) with Transnistrian President Vadim Krasnoselsky to his left and Metropolitan of Moscow and All Rus' Cornelius (Titov) to his right, during the later's visit in Transnistria

Mikheyev opposes the reconciliation with the Russian Orthodox Church, what he and other Old Believers calls the "new-rite Church." In 1971, the Local Council of the Russian Orthodox Church took place and recognized the old and new rites as equal. However, Mikheev said that Old Believers were not affected by the council and did not trust the new developments as the two churches are not in communion with one another. Mikheev says that reconciliation will only be possible between the two churches if the "new-rite Church" readopts the pre-Nikon traditions.

Regarding the increasing ties between the Russian Orthodox Church and the Russian government, Mikheev views this as a positive change and says that he hopes that more Orthodoxy being introduced in the government and schools will ultimately bring more individuals back to the Old Believer faith.

Mikheev says that although he appreciates Aleksandr Solzhenitsyn's writings that were often sympathetic to the Old Believer traditions, he says that Old Believers cannot fully accept Solzhenitsyn as he himself was not religiously an Old Believer. Mikheev says that he has greater appreciation for Dmitry Likhachov as the latter came from a family that had Old Believer roots. He claims that Likhachev even visited Mikheev's church in Rogozhsky where Likhachev was given a tour, an honor that would not usually be given to individuals from outside the community.

In 2018, he accompanied Metropolitan Cornelius during his visit in Moldova, where he met with the President Igor Dodon and Russian Ambassador Farit Mukhametshin, but also with the President of the unrecognized Pridnestrovian Moldavian Republic, Vadim Krasnoselsky (in Bender). Krasnoselsky told them that here, in Transnistria, you are not guests, but at home, because Transnistria is Russian land, Russian world.

On 31 January-2 February 2023, Eumenius participated in the Winter Council of the Russian Orthodox Old-Rite Church, where Metropolitan Cornelius expressed support for the Russian invasion of Ukraine.
