= Lyakhovo, Orekhovo-Zuyevsky District, Moscow Oblast =

Rural locality in Orekhovo-Zuyevsky District, Moscow Oblast, Russia

Coordinates: 55°37.162′N 38°50.28′E

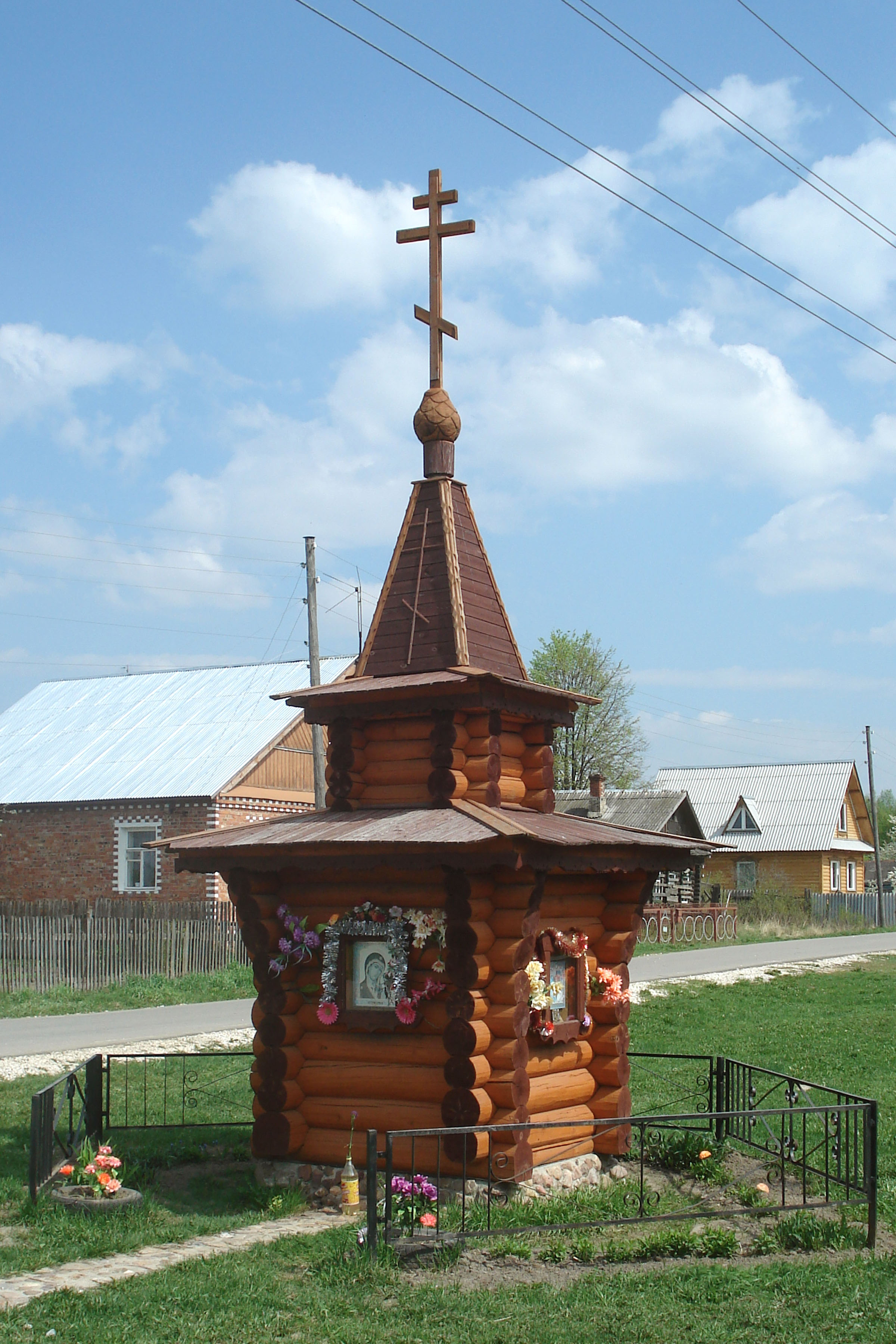
Lyakhovo. Old Believers' Chapel

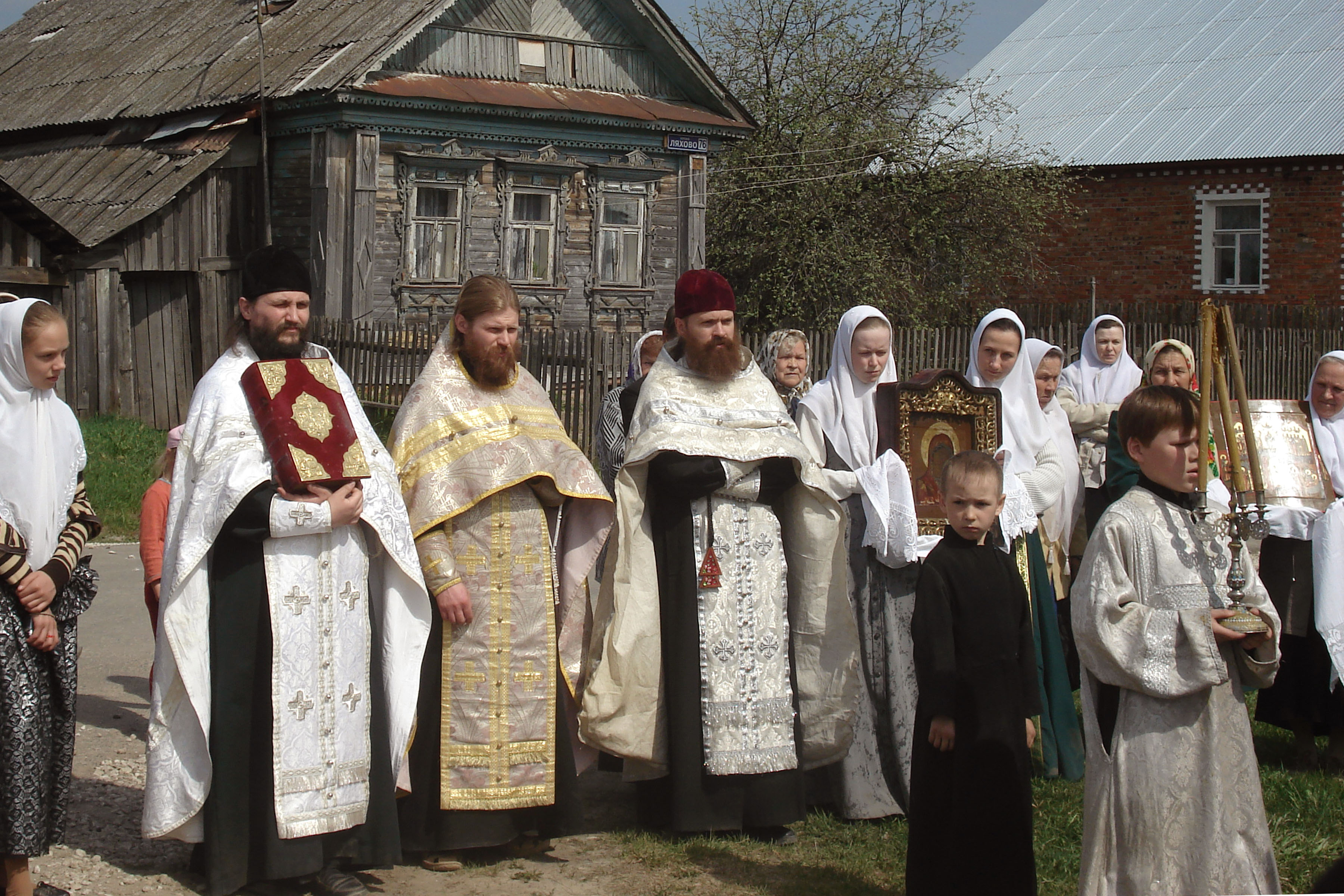
The communal Old Believers' Service in Lyakhovo for the Bright Easter Week. May 2, 2008.

Lyakhovo (Russian: Ля́хово) is a village in Orekhovo-Zuyevsky District of Moscow Oblast, Russia, located 75 kilometers (47 mi) south-east of Moscow. Population: 71 (1997 est.). Postal code: 142641.

Municipally, the village is a part of Davydovsky Rural Settlement (the administrative center of which is the village of Davydovo).

== History ==
The village is located in the historical area of Zakhod (a part of Guslitsa).

In the 19th century, it was a part of Zaponerskaya Volost of Bogoroditsky Uyezd. As of 1862, the population of Lyakhovo consisted of 43 homesteads comprising 382 people (191 male and 191 female).

The overwhelming majority of the population of Lyakhovo were Old Believers and from the end of the 19th century they were under the auspices of the Russian Orthodox Old-Rite Church. There was an Old Believers chapel in the village.

According to legends, all people from Lyakhovo were sorcerers.
