= Uleima Monastery =

Coordinates: 57°26′33″N 38°24′30″E

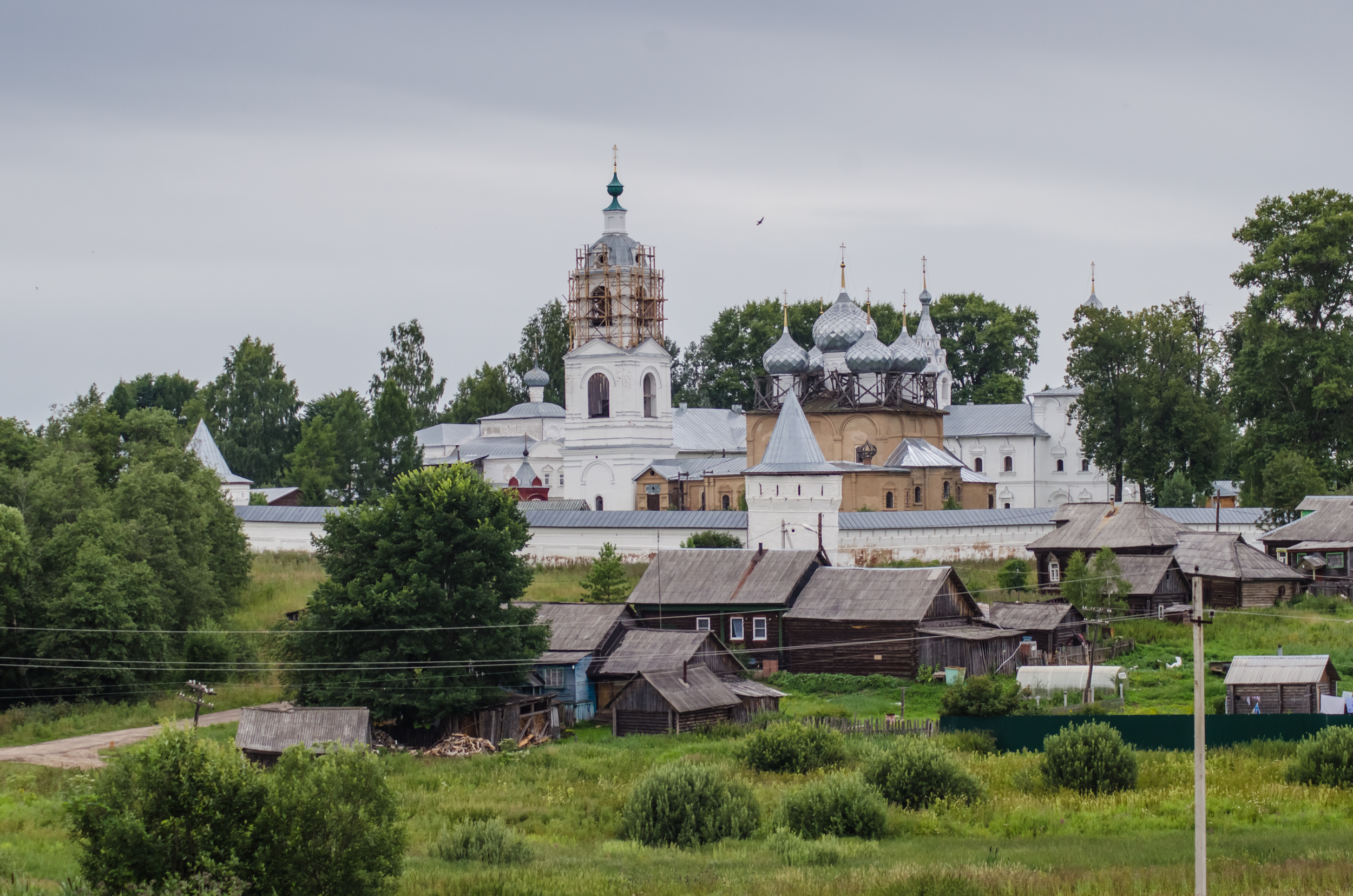
The village of Uleima near the monastery

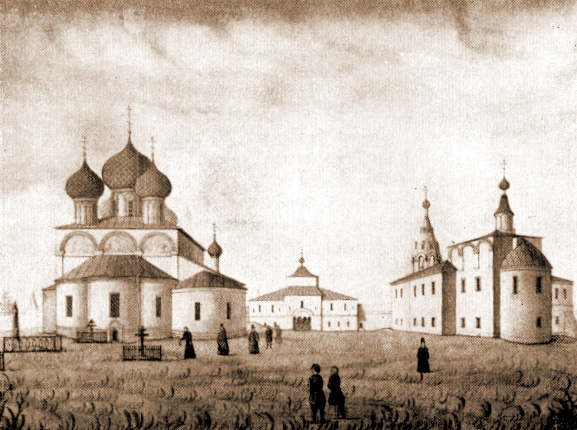
The main church and the refectory church in the 1840s

The Uleima Monastery of St. Nicholas (Николо-Улейминский монастырь; Uleiminsky Monastery) is a seldom visited walled medieval monastery lost in the woods near Uglich, Russia. It is the only sizable monastery still controlled by the Old-Rite Church, or Old Believers.

The monastery takes its name from the Uleima River (a tributary of the Yukhot River). It was established in the early 15th century by a Rostov monk who brought with him an icon of St Nicholas from the Italian city of Bari (which holds the relics of that saint).

The monastery enjoyed the patronage of the ruling Princes of Uglich. As a key fortress on the highway between Rostov and Uglich, it was attacked by the invading Poles and Lithuanians on three occasions (1609, 1612, 1619). Several thousand monks and peasants defended the monastery against Jan Sapieha, with many losing their lives after the main church had collapsed in flames.

The five-domed katholikon was rebuilt in several stages from the 1620s to the 1670s. The refectory church of the Presentation was rebuilt in 1695. The walls, towers, and the gate church all date from the 1710s.

After Peter the Great brought to Russia a portion of St. Nicholas's relics, his relatives from the Naryshkin family had it presented to the Uleima monks. Like the better known Monastery of Sts Boris and Gleb near Rostov, the Uleima Monastery continued to attract pilgrims travelling between Uglich and Rostov.

The Soviets had the monastery closed from 1930 until 1992. The dilapidated buildings were given to an underfunded local orphanage and began to crumble. Some restoration work was carried out in the 1960s. The Old-Rite Church, citing a lack of monks joining the community, turned it into a nunnery in 1998.
