= Lyakhovo, Yermekeyevsky District, Republic of Bashkortostan =

Lyakhovo Ляхово
- Village
- Location within Bashkortostan Location within Russia
- Coordinates: 53°57′N 53°46′E
- Country: Russia
- Region: Bashkortostan
- District: Yermekeyevsky District
- Time zone: UTC+5:00

Lyakhovo (Russian: Ляхово) is a rural locality (a village) in Spartaksky Selsoviet, Yermekeyevsky District, Bashkortostan, Russia. The population was 12 as of 2010. There is 1 street.

== Geography ==
Lyakhovo is located 20 km southeast of Yermekeyevo (the district's administrative centre) by road. Spartak is the nearest rural locality.
