= Lyakhovo, Karmaskalinsky District, Republic of Bashkortostan =

Lyakhovo Ляхово
- Village
- Location within Bashkortostan Location within Russia
- Coordinates: 54°23′N 55°41′E
- Country: Russia
- Region: Bashkortostan
- District: Karmaskalinsky District
- Time zone: UTC+5:00

Lyakhovo (Russian: Ляхово) is a rural locality (a village) in Podlubovsky Selsoviet, Karmaskalinsky District, Bashkortostan, Russia. The population was 94 as of 2010. There are 3 streets.

== Geography ==
Lyakhovo is located 45 km west of Karmaskaly (the district's administrative centre) by road. Repyevka is the nearest rural locality.
