= Davydovo, Orekhovo-Zuyevsky District, Moscow Oblast =

Rural locality in Orekhovo-Zuyevsky District, Moscow Oblast, Russia

Coordinates: 55°36.53′N 38°51.32′E

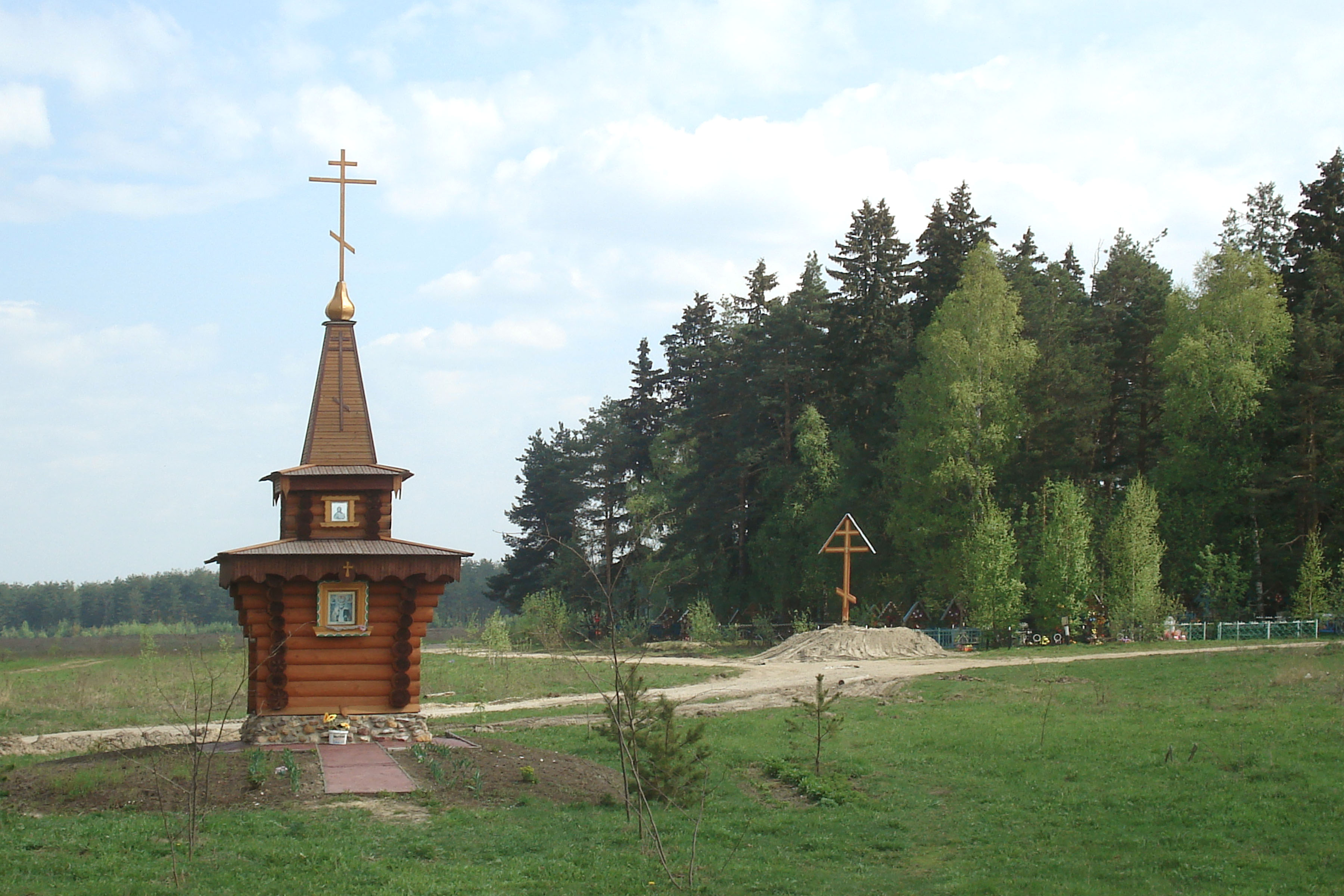
Old Believers' chapel near the Davydovo cemetery

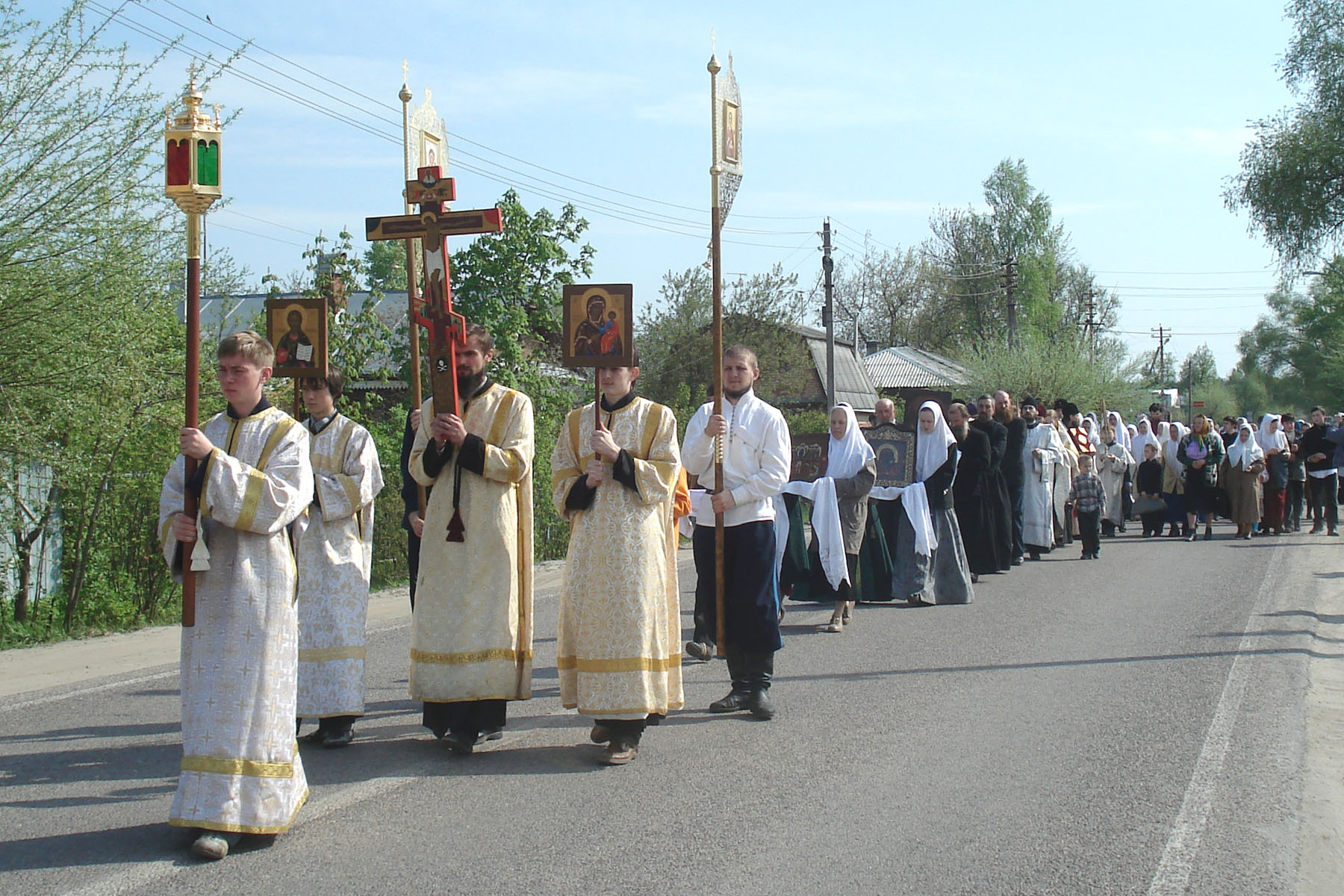
Traditional Paschal Crucession by Russian Orthodox Old-Rite Church in Davydovo (May 2, 2008)

Davydovo (Russian: Давы́дово) is a rural locality (a village) in Orekhovo-Zuyevsky District of Moscow Oblast, Russia, located 78 kilometers (48 mi) southeast of Moscow and 30 kilometers (19 mi) south of Orekhovo-Zuyevo. Municipally, the village is the administrative center of Davydovskoye Rural Settlement. Population: 10,918 (2010 census); 10,694 (2002 census). Postal code: 142641.

Davydovo was first mentioned in 1631.

The village of Davydovo is located in the historical area of Zakhod, which is considered by the majority of historians as a part of a larger Guslitsa area. The overwhelming majority of the population of village were Old Believers. An Old Believers' (Russian Orthodox Old-Rite Church) Feast of the Cross church is located
