= Yurshinsky Island =

Island in the Rybinsk Reservoir

Native name: Юршинский остров
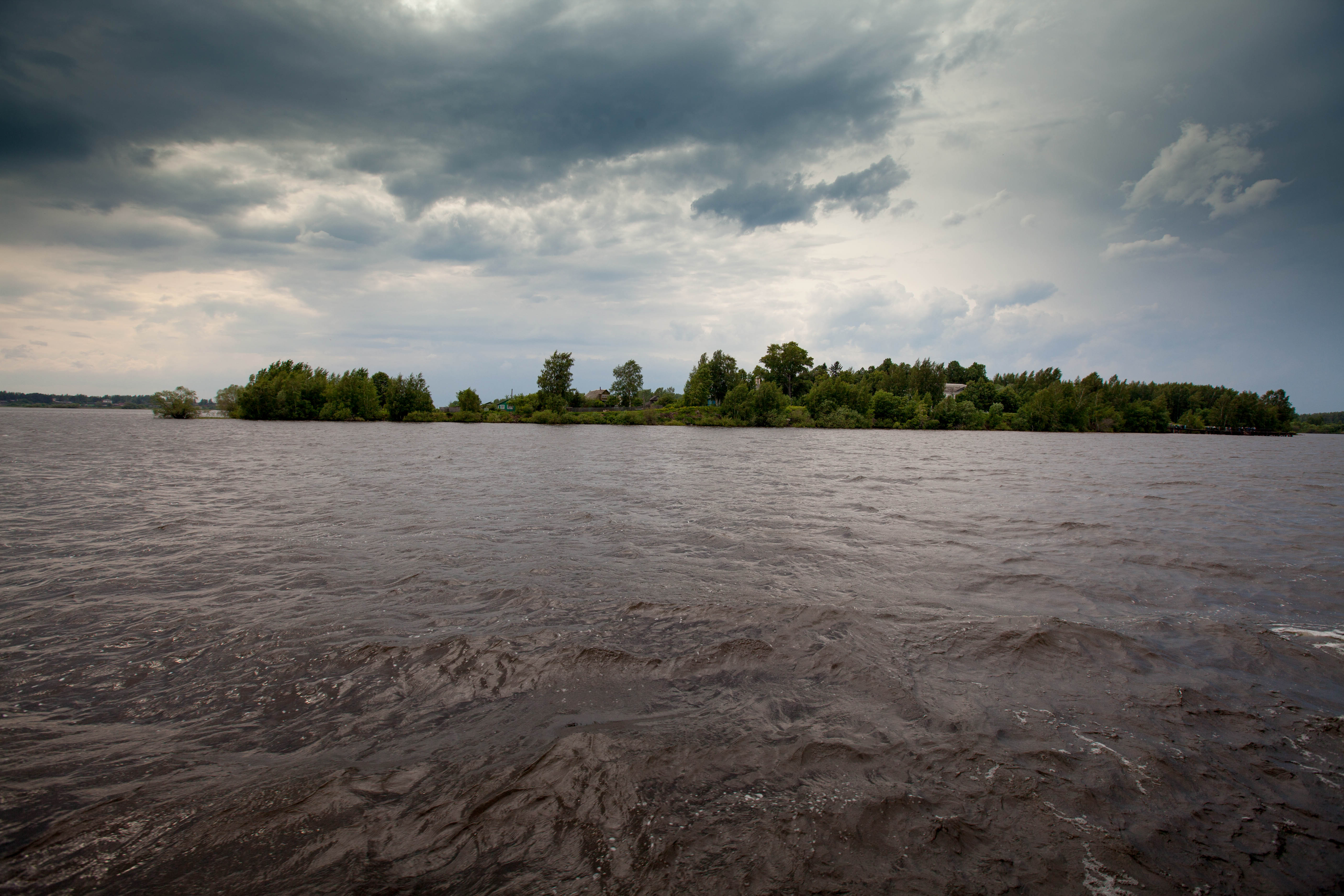
- Interactive map of Yurshinsky Island

Geography
- Location: Rybinsk Reservoir
- Coordinates: 58.139°N 38.617°E
- Length: 3.5 km (2.17 mi)

Administration
- Russia

Yurshinsky Island is located at south end of the Rybinsk Reservoir at the mouth of the Volga River, Tver Oblast, Russia. It is about 3.5 km long and 2.5 km wide. The island was once part of the land but became an island when the Rybinsk Reservoir was created, flooding the land between. It is mostly forested.

Located on the island are some small settlements and the abandoned Dello Estate.

== Gallery ==
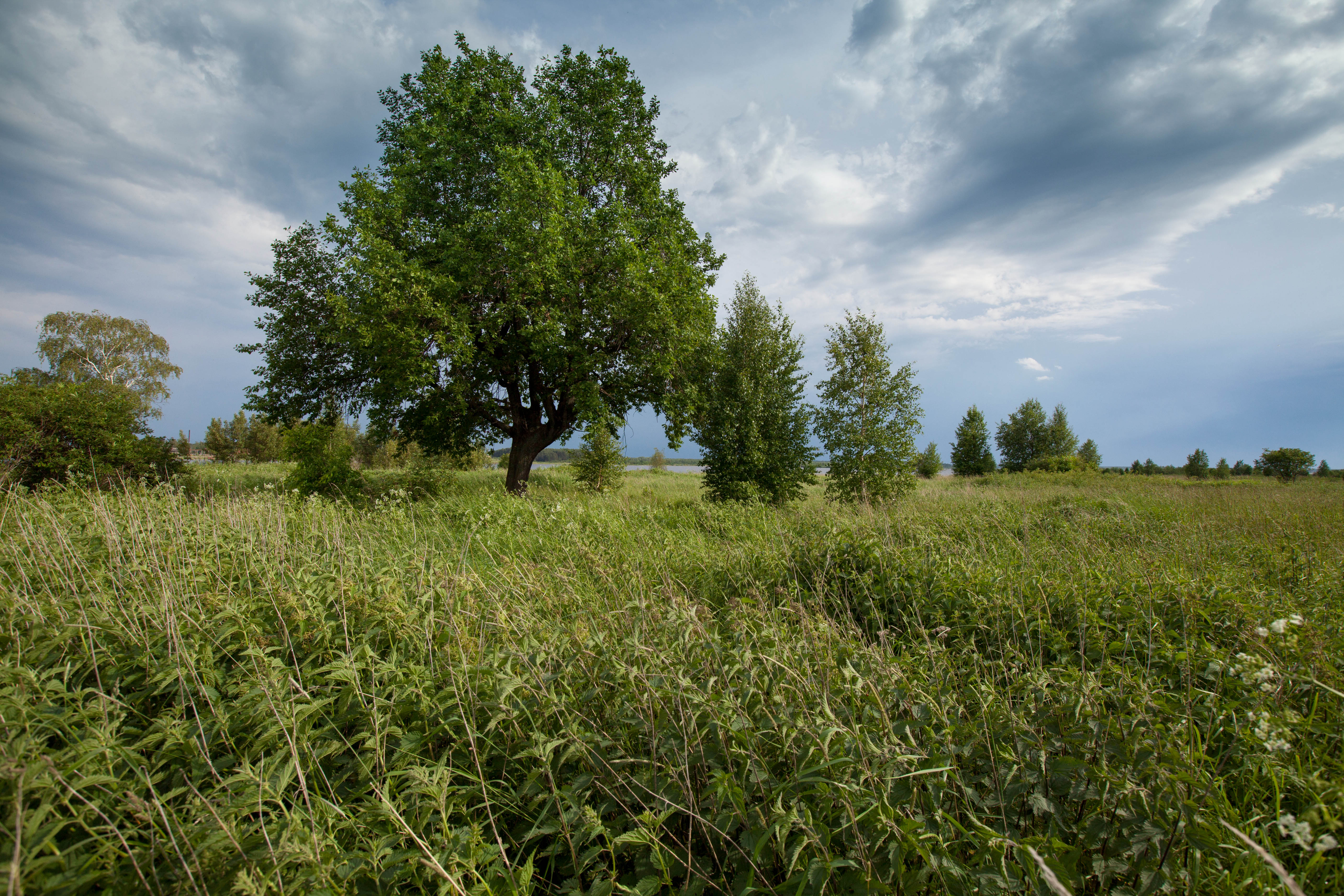
Flora

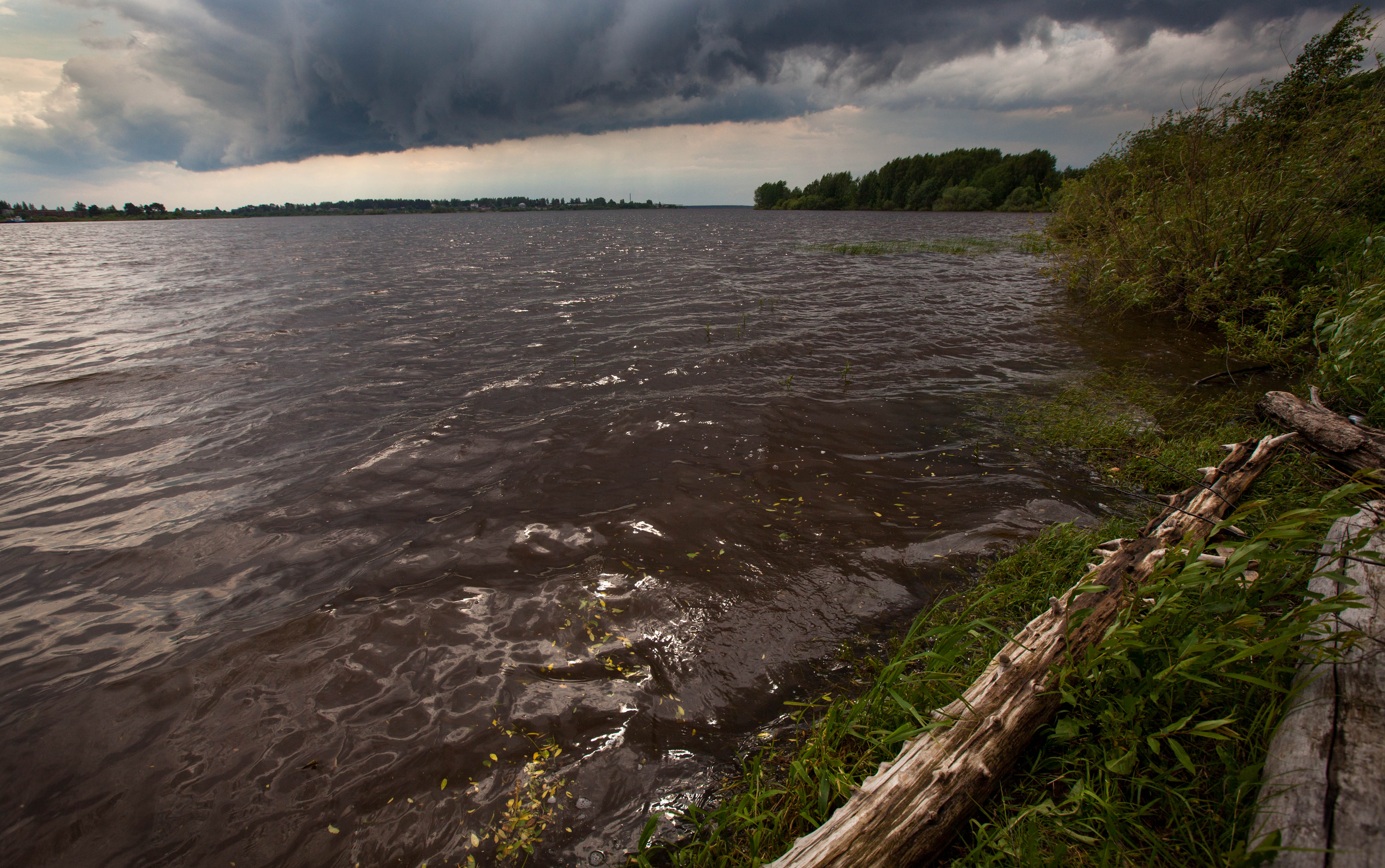
Shoreline

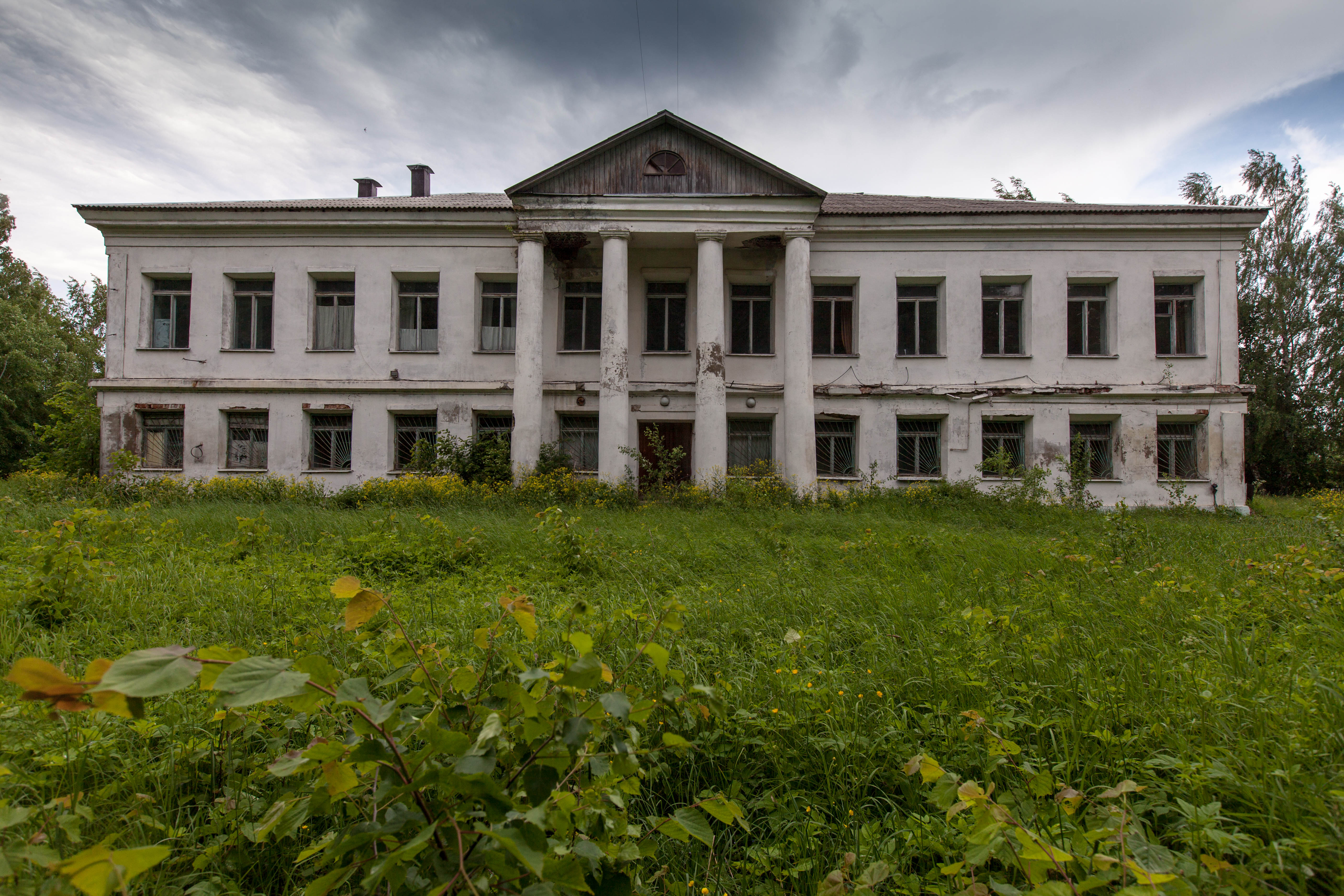
Dello Estate, exterior

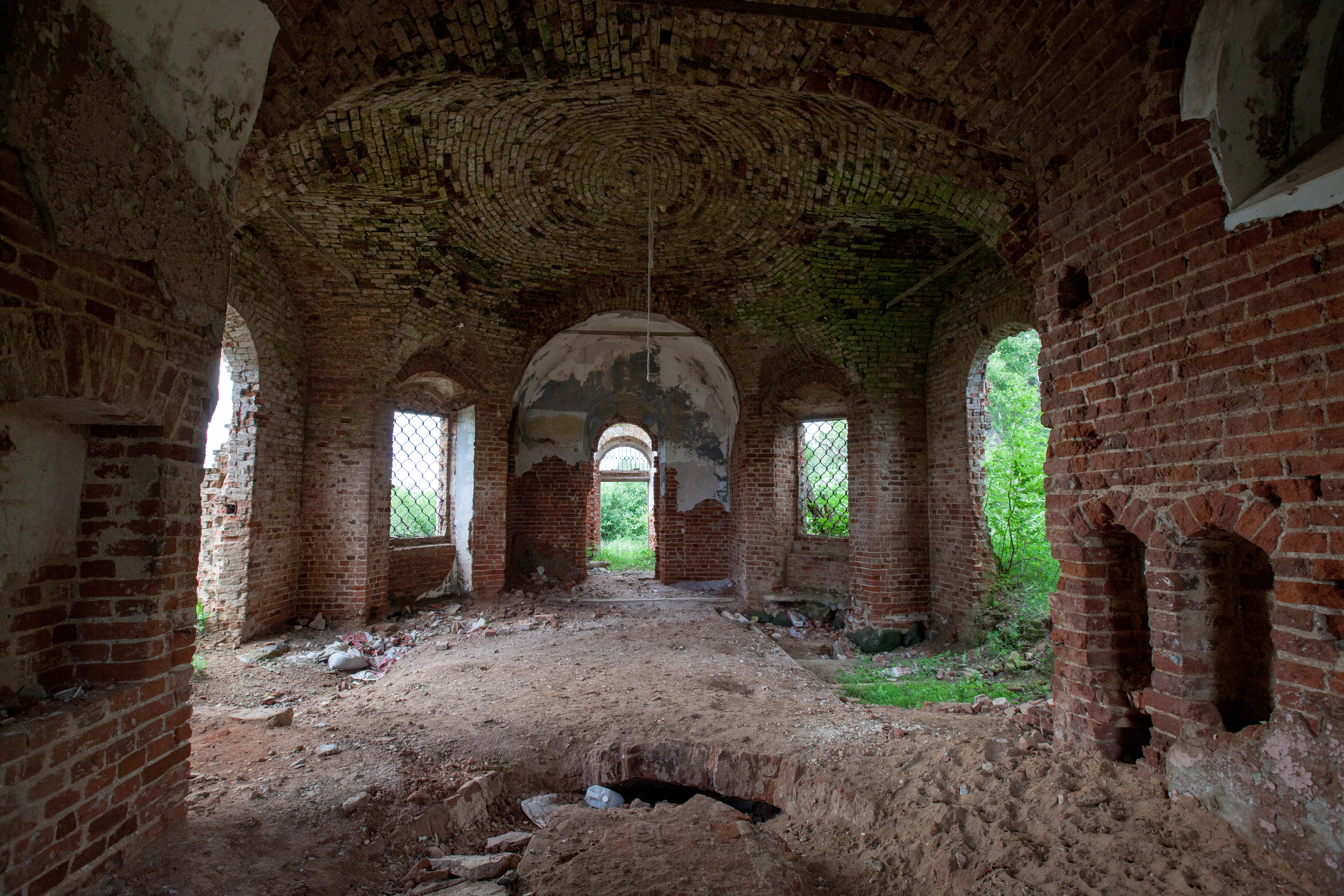
Dello Estate, interior
