= 2026 Tver Oblast gubernatorial election =

Regional legislative election in Russia

- 18–20 September 2026
- Turnout: 46.22% ▲4.26 pp
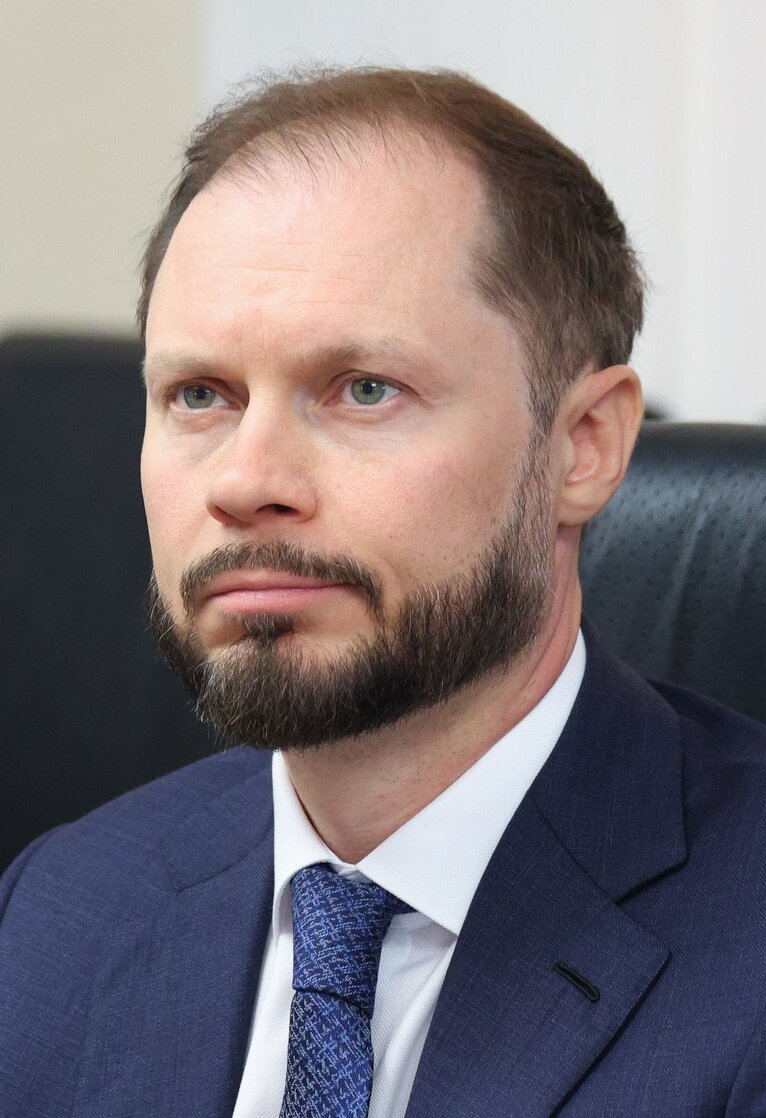
		CPRF
Candidate	Vitaly Korolyov	Lyudmila Vorobyova
Party	United Russia	CPRF
Popular vote	316,257	47,729
Percentage	69.48%	10.49%
	LDPR	SR
Candidate	Olga Levina	Tatyana Petrova
Party	LDPR	A Just Russia
Popular vote	29,296	25,662
Percentage	6.44%	5.64%
Governor before election
Vitaly Korolyov (acting)
United Russia
Governor-elect
Vitaly Korolyov
United Russia
Senator before election
Lyudmila Skakovskaya
United Russia
Senator after election
Aleksey Meshkov
Independent

The 2026 Tver Oblast gubernatorial election took place on 18–20 September 2026, on common election day, to elect the Governor of Tver Oblast, coinciding with the 2026 Tver Oblast legislative election and the 2026 Russian legislative election. Acting Governor Vitaly Korolyov was elected for a full term in office.

== Background ==
Igor Rudenya, an agriculture executive and former high-ranking Government of Russia staffer, was appointed acting Governor of Tver Oblast in March 2016, replacing one-term incumbent Andrey Shevelyov. Rudenya won the election for full term in September 2016 with 72.13% of the vote. Governor Rudenya ran for a second term in 2021 and won re-election with a lackluster 52.33% of the vote, narrowly crossing the 50%-threshold to avoid a runoff. During his two terms in office Rudenya did not became a political heavyweight and allegedly grew tired of leading Tver Oblast.

In late September 2025 Igor Rudenya was named a potential candidate for a position of Presidential Envoy to the Northwestern Federal District, left vacant by a newly-appointed Prosecutor General of Russia Aleksandr Gutsan. On September 28, 2025, Rudenya was appointed Presidential Envoy by President of Russia Vladimir Putin and resigned from office, while Deputy Chairwoman of the Tver Oblast Government – Minister of Finance Marina Podtikhova became acting Governor of Tver Oblast on a temporary basis. Several candidates were considered for Rudenya's replacement, including Deputy Minister of Natural Resources and Environment of Russia Denis Butsayev (who briefly served as acting Governor of Belgorod Oblast in 2020), former Deputy Minister of Industry and Trade of Russia Viktor Yevtukhov, First Deputy Governor of Tomsk Oblast Andrey Dunayev, Hero of Russia Anatoly Sysoyev, and former Tver mayor Vasily Toloko, however, some of the candidates allegedly declined the position which resulted in a monthlong vacancy. On November 4, 2025, Putin appointed Deputy Head of the Federal Antimonopoly Service Vitaly Korolyov as acting Governor of Tver Oblast, replacing Podtikhova. Korolyov was previously named a potential candidate to replace then-Governor of Krasnoyarsk Krai Aleksandr Uss in 2023.

== Candidates ==
In Tver Oblast candidates for governor of Tver Oblast can be nominated only by registered political parties. A candidate for Governor of Tver Oblast should be a Russian citizen and at least 30 years old. Candidates for Governor of Tver Oblast should not have a foreign citizenship or residence permit. Each candidate in order to be registered is required to collect at least 7% of the signatures of municipal deputies and heads of municipalities. Also gubernatorial candidates present 3 candidacies to the Federation Council and election winner later appoints one of the presented candidates.

On June 25, 2026, Moskovsky District Court of Tver blocked Communist Party of the Russian Federation from holding its party conference on June 27 due to legal action from several expelled party members. The conference was initially postponed by the court until July 14, a day after the filing deadline for gubernatorial candidates, which would have left Communist Party without its nominee for the upcoming election. CPRF was later allowed to held its conference on July 8, where the party fielded its candidates for the gubernatorial and legislative elections.

=== Declared candidates ===
Candidate name, political party	Occupation	Status	Ref.
Vitaly Korolyov; United Russia	Acting Governor of Tver Oblast (2025–present); Former Deputy Head of the Federal Antimonopoly Service (2015–2025)	Registered	
Olga Levina; Liberal Democratic Party	Client manager at Ozon regional office	Registered	
Sergey Malinkovich; Communists of Russia	Member of Altai Krai Legislative Assembly (2021–present); Chairman of the Communists of Russia party (2022–present); Perennial candidate 2024 presidential candidate	Registered	
Tatyana Petrova; A Just Russia	Private clinic owner	Registered	
Lyudmila Vorobyova; Communist Party	Member of Legislative Assembly of Tver Oblast (2006–present); 2021 gubernatorial candidate	Registered	
Igor Yakovenko; Party of Pensioners	Deputy director of the Russian University of Medicine, Lipetsk branch	Registered	

=== Declined ===
- Oleg Lebedev (CPRF), Member of State Duma (2012–present)

=== Candidates for Federation Council ===
Gubernatorial candidate, political party	Candidates for Federation Council	Status
Vitaly Korolyov; United Russia	* Aleksey Meshkov, Ambassador of Russia to France (2017–present) * Yulia Saranova, Member of State Duma (2021–present) * Lyudmila Skakovskaya, incumbent Senator (2021–present)	Registered
Olga Levina; Liberal Democratic Party	* Aleksandr Parfenovich, party coordinator in Tver * Konstantin Shumakov, engineering executive * Natalia Vdovina, Member of Kalyazinsky District Duma (2023–present)	Registered
Sergey Malinkovich; Communists of Russia	* Vera Bogacheva, perennial candidate * Vitaly Duryagin, pensioner * Dmitry Slitinsky, IT engineer, perennial candidate	Registered
Tatyana Petrova; A Just Russia	* Eduard Belykh, Member of Legislative Assembly of Tver Oblast (2011–present) * Artyom Goncharov, Member of Legislative Assembly of Tver Oblast (2011–present) * Dmitry Ignatkov, former Member of Tver City Duma (2017–2022), engineer, 2021 gubernatorial candidate	Registered
Lyudmila Vorobyova; Communist Party	* Aleksandr Grishin, Member of Legislative Assembly of Tver Oblast (2001–2011, 2021–present), 2003 gubernatorial candidate * Yevgeny Rasskazov, individual entrepreneur * Vyacheslav Rassolov, tekhnikum supply manager	Registered
Igor Yakovenko; Party of Pensioners	* Aleksandr Abramov, retired police podpolkovnik * Viktor Kuznetsov, lawyer * Maya Moreva, former Deputy Mayor of Solnechnogorsk (2016–2025)	Registered

== Results ==
Summary of the 18–20 September 2026 Tver Oblast gubernatorial election results
Candidate	Party	Votes	%
Vitaly Korolyov (incumbent)	United Russia	316,257	69.48
Lyudmila Vorobyova	Communist Party	47,729	10.49
Olga Levina	Liberal Democratic Party	29,296	6.44
Tatyana Petrova	A Just Russia	25,662	5.64
Sergey Malinkovich	Communists of Russia	13,331	2.93
Igor Yakovenko	Party of Pensioners	8,820	1.94
Valid votes		441,095	96.90
Blank ballots		14,106	3.10
Total		455,201	100.00
Turnout		455,201	46.22
Registered voters		984,839	100.00

Governor Korolyov appointed Ambassador of Russia to France Aleksey Meshkov (Independent) to the Federation Council, replacing incumbent Senator Lyudmila Skakovskaya (United Russia).

== See also ==
- 2026 Russian regional elections
