= 2021 Tver Oblast gubernatorial election =

- 17–19 September 2021
- Turnout: 41.96%
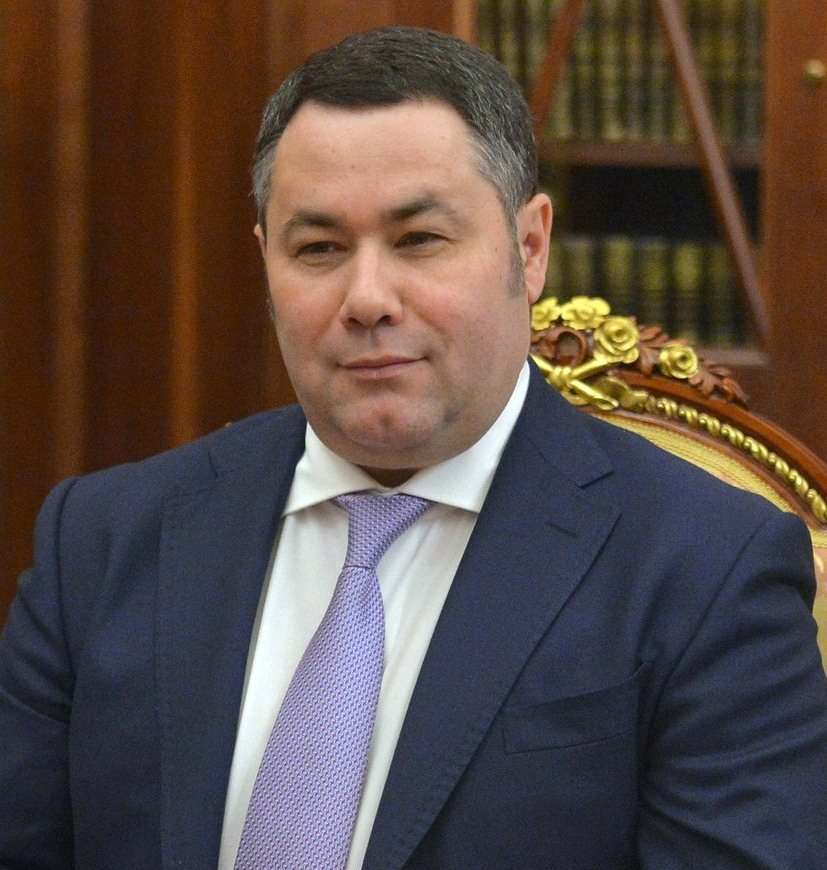
		CPRF	SR-ZP
Candidate	Igor Rudenya	Lyudmila Vorobyova	Dmitry Ignatkov
Party	United Russia	CPRF	SR-ZP
Popular vote	225,020	86,389	45,981
Percentage	52.33%	20.09%	10.69%
	LDPR	CR
Candidate	Oleg Gorlov	Ilya Kleymenov
Party	LDPR	CPCR
Popular vote	28,022	27,089
Percentage	6.52%	6.30%
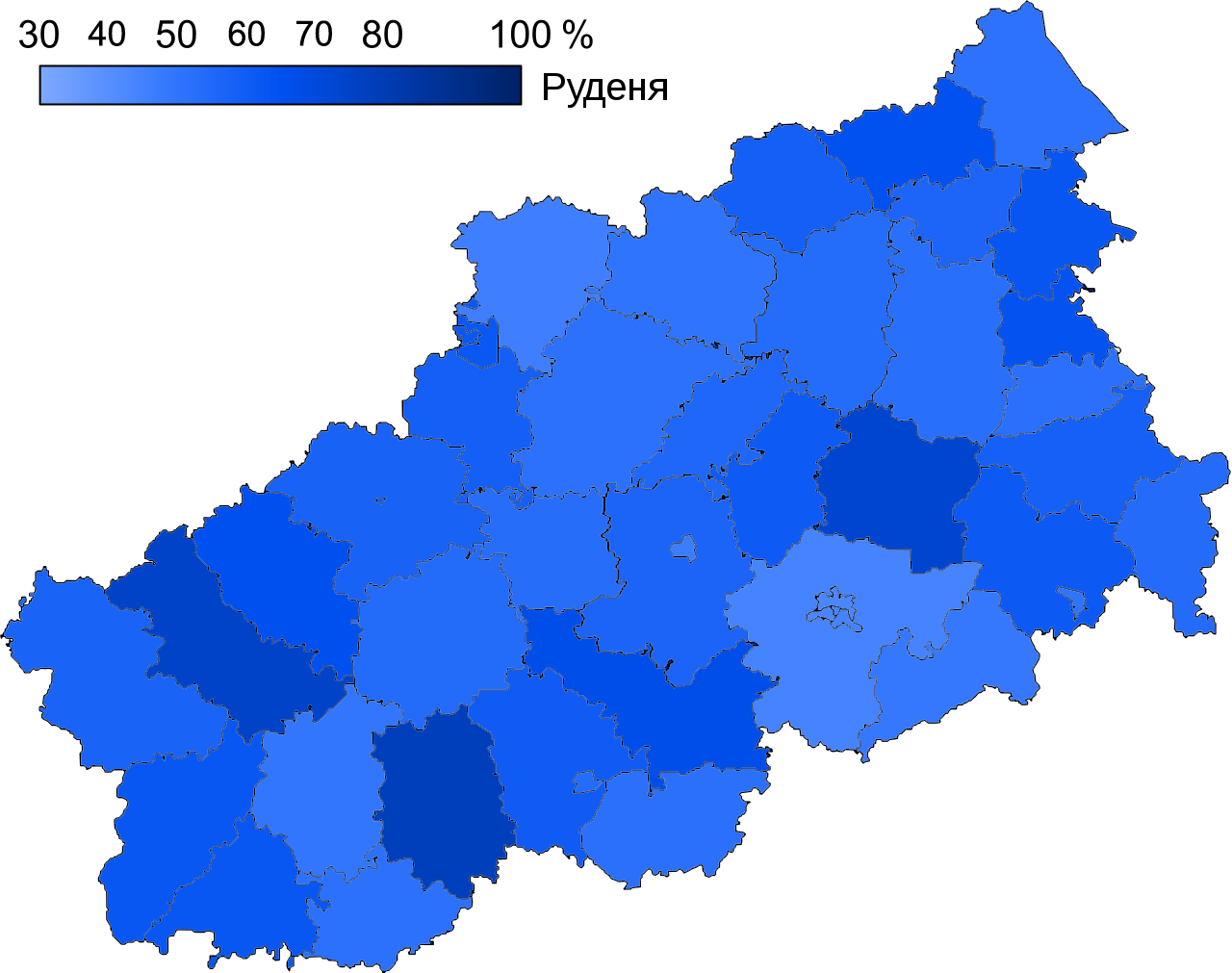
- Results by administrative division
Governor before election
Igor Rudenya
United Russia
Elected Governor
Igor Rudenya
United Russia

The 2021 Tver Oblast gubernatorial election was held on 17–19 September 2021, on common election day, coinciding with election to the State Duma. Incumbent Governor Igor Rudenya was reelected for his second term.

== Background ==
Igor Rudenya became Governor of Tver Oblast in March 2016 replacing first-term Governor Andrey Shevelyov. Rudenya previously served as general director of CJSC "Roszerno" (1996-2002, 2012–2016) and Deputy Minister of Agriculture (2005-2007). Igor Rudenya won 2016 gubernatorial election with 72.13% of the vote.

Governor Rudenya since 2009 was considered for the post of Minister of Agriculture, the rumours again floated in 2021. Ultimately he decided to run for another term.

== Candidates ==
Only political parties can nominate candidates for gubernatorial election in Tver Oblast, self-nomination is not possible. However, candidate is not obliged to be a member of the nominating party. Candidate for Governor of Tver Oblast should be a Russian citizen and at least 30 years old. Candidates for Governor should not have a foreign citizenship or residence permit. Each candidate in order to be registered is required to collect at least 7% of signatures of members and heads of municipalities (175-183 signatures). Also gubernatorial candidates present 3 candidacies to the Federation Council and election winner later appoints one of the presented candidates.

=== Registered candidates ===
- Oleg Gorlov (LDPR), advisor to Vladimir Zhirinovsky for economic affairs
- Dmitry Ignatkov (SR-ZP), Member of Tver City Duma
- Ilya Kleymenov (Communists of Russia), Member of Konakovsky District Assembly of Deputies, first secretary of CPCR regional committee, 2016 gubernatorial candidate
- Igor Rudenya (United Russia), incumbent Governor of Tver Oblast
- Lyudmila Vorobyova (CPRF), Member of Legislative Assembly of Tver Oblast

=== Declined ===
- Aleksey Chepa (SR-ZP), Member of State Duma (running for re-election)
- Pavel Grudinin (CPRF), director of CJSC "Lenin Sovkhoz", 2018 Russian presidential candidate (ran for State Duma but was disqualified)
- Anton Morozov (LDPR), Member of State Duma, 2016 gubernatorial candidate (running for re-election and for Federation Council)

=== Candidates for the Federation Council ===
Incumbent Senator Vladimir Lukin (Independent) was not renominated.

- Oleg Gorlov (LDPR):
  - Leonid Bulatov, member of Tver City Duma, aide to State Duma member Anton Morozov
  - Dmitry Karpov, member of Konakovsky District Assembly of Deputies, aide to State Duma member Anton Morozov
  - Anton Morozov, member of State Duma, 2016 gubernatorial candidate
- Dmitry Ignatkov (SR-ZP):
  - Eduard Belykh, member of Legislative Assembly of Tver Oblast
  - Gennady Chukhovin, manager for sales at IP Romanova O.Z.
  - Aleksey Tikhomirov, member of Kalininsky District Assembly of Deputies, aide to State Duma member Aleksey Chepa
- Ilya Kleymenov (Communists of Russia):
  - Vera Bogacheva, pensioner
  - Mikhail Noin, second secretary of CPCR regional committee
  - Aleksey Vakhalin, member of Shcherbininskoye, Kalininsky District Council of Deputies
- Igor Rudenya (United Russia):
  - Lyudmila Skakovskaya, rector of Tver State University
  - Andrey Yepishin, Senator of the Federation Council (from the Legislative Assembly of Tver Oblast)
  - Sergey Zhuravlyov, Head of Staritsky District
- Lyudmila Vorobyova (CPRF):
  - Andrey Istomin, member of Legislative Assembly of Tver Oblast
  - Dmitry Petrov, director of LLP "Auris"
  - Aleksey Plyukhin, assistant in radio-biology, Tver State University

== Results ==
Summary of the 17-19 September 2021 Tver Oblast gubernatorial election results
Candidate	Party	Votes	%
Igor Rudenya (incumbent)	United Russia	225,020	52.33
Lyudmila Vorobyova	Communist Party	86,389	20.09
Dmitry Ignatkov	A Just Russia — For Truth	45,981	10.69
Oleg Gorlov	Liberal Democratic Party	28,022	6.52
Ilya Kleymenov	Communists of Russia	27,089	6.30
Valid votes		412,501	95.93
Blank ballots		17,503	4.07
Total		430,004	100.00
Turnout		430,004	41.69
Registered voters		1,031,402	100.00

Tver State University rector Lyudmila Skakovskaya (United Russia) was appointed to the Federation Council replacing incumbent Senator Vladimir Lukin (Independent).
