= Tver constituency =

Legislative constituency in Russia

Tver single-member constituency
- Constituency of the Russian State Duma

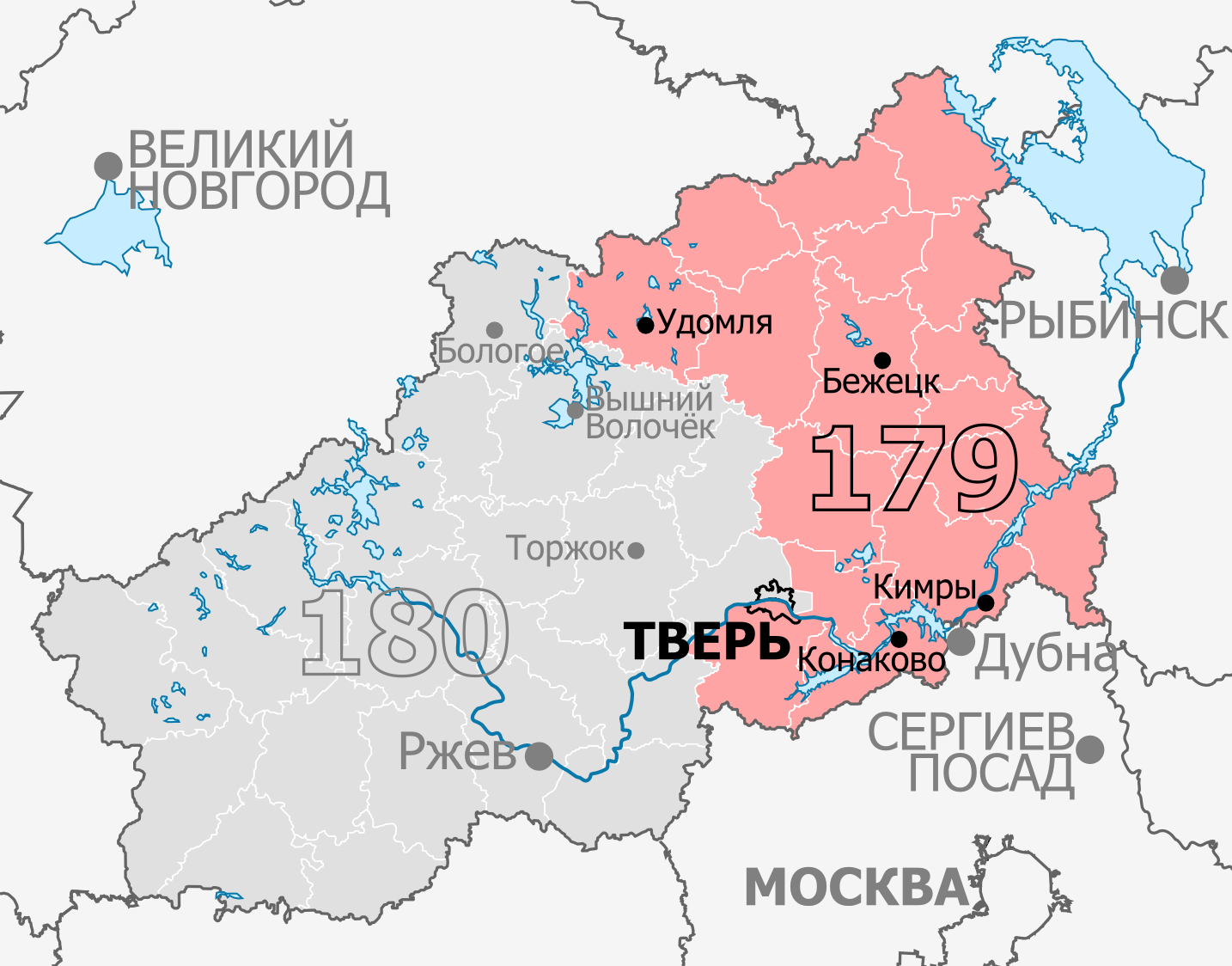
- Constituency boundaries since 2016
- Deputy: Alena Arshinova; United Russia
- Federal subject: Tver Oblast
- Districts: Bezhetsky, Kalininsky (Burashevskoe, Emmausskoe, Kablukovskoe, Krasnogorskoe, Nikulinskoe, Orsha, Shcherbininskoe, Slavnovskoe, Sukhoverkovo, Turginovskoe, Verkhnevolzhskoe), Kalyazinsky, Kashinsky, Kesovogorsky, Kimrsky, Kimry, Konakovsky, Krasnokholmsky, Lesnoy, Maksatikhinsky, Molokovsky, Rameshkovsky, Sandovsky, Sonkovsky, Tver (Moskovsky, Proletarsky, Tsentralny), Udomelsky, Vesyegonsky
- Voters: 492,860 (2026)

The Tver constituency (No.178 (Note: No.172 in 1993-1995, No.173 in 1995-2007, No.179 in 2016–2026)) is a Russian legislative constituency in Tver Oblast. The constituency covers part of Tver on the right bank of the Volga river and eastern Tver Oblast, including the towns Bezhetsk, Kimry, Konakovo and Udomlya.

The constituency has been represented since 2026 by United Russia deputy Alena Arshinova, four-term State Duma member and party activist, who won the open seat after one-term United Russia incumbent Yulia Saranova ran for Legislative Assembly of Tver Oblast.

== Boundaries ==
1993–2007: Andreapolsky District, Belsky District, Kalininsky District, Kuvshinovsky District, Nelidovsky District, Oleninsky District, Rzhev, Rzhevsky District, Selizharovsky District, Staritsky District, Toropetsky District, Tver, Zapadnodvinsky District, Zharkovsky District, Zubtsovsky District
The constituency covered the entirety of the oblast capital Tver, its suburbs as well as rural western Tver Oblast, including the town Rzhev.

2016–present: Bezhetsky District, Kalininsky District (Burashevskoye, Emmausskoye, Kablukovskoye, Krasnogorskoye, Nikulinskoye, Orsha, Shcherbininskyoe, Slavnovskoye, Sukhoverkovo, Turginovskoye, Verkhnevolzhskoye), Kalyazinsky District, Kashinsky District, Kesovogorsky District, Kimrsky District, Kimry, Konakovsky District, Krasnokholmsky District, Lesnoy District, Maksatikhinsky District, Molokovsky District, Rameshkovsky District, Sandovsky District, Sonkovsky District, Tver (Moskovsky, Proletarsky, Tsentralny), Udomelsky District, Vesyegonsky District
The constituency was re-created for the 2016 election and retained only southern Tver and its suburbs, losing the rest of its former territory to new Zavolzhsky constituency. This seat instead gained eastern Tver Oblast from the dissolved Bezhetsk constituency.

== Members elected ==
Election	Member	Party
1993	Tatyana Astrakhankina	Communist Party
1995	Tatyana Astrakhankina	Communist Party
1999	Tatyana Astrakhankina	Communist Party
2003	Vladimir Vasilyev	United Russia
2007	Proportional representation - no election by constituency	
2011	Proportional representation - no election by constituency	
2016	Svetlana Maksimova	United Russia
2021	Yulia Saranova	United Russia
2026	Alena Arshinova	United Russia

== Election results ==
=== 1993 ===
Summary of the 12 December 1993 Russian legislative election in the Tver constituency
Candidate	Party	Votes	%
Tatyana Astrakhankina	Communist Party	84,558	22.23%
Viktor Belov	Choice of Russia	–	18.60%
Vladimir Borisov	Agrarian Party	–	–
Aleksandr Bulychev	Russian Democratic Reform Movement	–	–
Eduard Savenko (Limonov)	Independent	–	–
Aleksandr Titov	Civic Union	–	–
Yury Tyulin	Dignity and Charity	–	–
Andrey Yarysh	Independent	–	–
Yevgeny Yevseyev	Democratic Party	–	–
Total		380,432	100%

=== 1995 ===
Summary of the 17 December 1995 Russian legislative election in the Tver constituency
Candidate	Party	Votes	%
Tatyana Astrakhankina (incumbent)	Communist Party	136,825	30.75%
Valery Rastorguyev	Congress of Russian Communities	62,240	13.99%
Vladimir Shkolnikov	Independent	54,878	12.33%
Sergey Medennikov	Independent	36,951	8.31%
Aleksandr Kharchenko	Our Home – Russia	35,148	7.90%
Vasily Krylov	Agrarian Party	21,071	4.74%
Nikolay Kuznetsov	Communists and Working Russia - for the Soviet Union	18,238	4.10%
Valery Nekhayev	For the Motherland!	9,997	2.25%
Mecheslav Sekerzhitsky	Independent	8,062	1.81%
Yury Boshnyak	Independent	4,862	1.09%
against all		44,988	10.11%
Total		444,908	100%

=== 1999 ===
Results by district: Tatyana Astrakhankina: 10–20% 20–30% 30–40% 40–50%; Aleksandr Kharchenko: 20–30%; Yury Parkhayev: 40–50%

Summary of the 19 December 1999 Russian legislative election in the Tver constituency
Candidate	Party	Votes	%
Tatyana Astrakhankina (incumbent)	Communist Party	92,428	22.97%
Aleksandr Kharchenko	Unity	41,061	10.20%
Sergey Yushenkov	Union of Right Forces	39,788	9.89%
Aleksandr Tyagunov	Our Home – Russia	30,381	7.55%
Yury Parkhayev	Independent	24,794	6.16%
Nikolay Kuznetsov	Communists and Workers of Russia - for the Soviet Union	19,248	4.78%
Natalya Alyabysheva	Independent	17,931	4.46%
Konstantin Klyushkin	Yabloko	16,050	3.99%
Anatoly Danchenko	Independent	8,757	2.18%
Sergey Kondrashev	Independent	7,749	1.93%
Valery Rumyantsev	Independent	7,676	1.91%
Konstantin Kharchenko	Independent	5,654	1.40%
Gennady Dmitriyev	Social-Democrats	5,573	1.38%
Yevgeny Shamakin	Independent	4,899	1.22%
Vyacheslav Shmelev	Independent	4,596	1.14%
Valery Minevich	Congress of Russian Communities-Yury Boldyrev Movement	4,104	1.02%
Tatyana Pushay	Spiritual Heritage	3,855	0.96%
Sergey Petrenko	Independent	1,954	0.49%
against all		56,892	14.14%
Total		402,466	100%

=== 2003 ===
Results by district: Vladimir Vasilyev: 20–30% 30–40% 40–50%; Tatyana Astrakhankina: 20–30%; Maksim Larin: 30–40%

Summary of the 7 December 2003 Russian legislative election in the Tver constituency
Candidate	Party	Votes	%
Vladimir Vasilyev	United Russia	113,273	31.39%
Tatyana Astrakhankina (incumbent)	Communist Party	68,139	18.88%
Maksim Larin	Independent	56,411	15.63%
Aleksandr Kharchenko	Independent	31,341	8.68%
Tatyana Agafonova	Agrarian Party	12,501	3.46%
Vladimir Orekhov	Union of Right Forces	9,504	2.63%
Vladimir Komissarov	Independent	8,767	2.43%
Natalya Alyabysheva	People's Party	5,564	1.54%
Konstantin Klyushkin	Yabloko	4,632	1.28%
Aleksandr Patsyk	Liberal Democratic Party	2,706	0.75%
Boris Rybka	Social Democratic Party	2,393	0.66%
Leonid Musin	Party of Russia's Rebirth-Russian Party of Life	2,142	0.59%
Aleksandr Bulychev	Genuine Patriots of Russia	2,031	0.56%
Aleksandr Palev	Great Russia – Eurasian Union	2,018	0.56%
Viktor Volkov	United Russian Party Rus'	667	0.18%
against all		29,847	8.27%
Total		361,346	100%

=== 2016 ===
Summary of the 18 September 2016 Russian legislative election in the Tver constituency
Candidate	Party	Votes	%
Svetlana Maksimova	United Russia	361,346	53.03%
Aleksey Chepa	A Just Russia	38,080	18.14%
Anton Morozov	Liberal Democratic Party	28,965	13.79%
Lyudmila Vorobyova	Communist Party	26,304	12.53%
Vadim Deshevkin	Rodina	14,168	6.75%
Ilya Kleymyonov	Communists of Russia	10,381	4.94%
Igor Alekseyev	Yabloko	9,509	4.53%
Total		209,953	100%

=== 2021 ===
Summary of the 17-19 September 2021 Russian legislative election in the Tver constituency
Candidate	Party	Votes	%
Yulia Saranova	United Russia	62,870	30.91%
Oleg Lebedev	Communist Party	35,685	17.54%
Aleksey Chepa	A Just Russia — For Truth	27,376	13.46%
Ilya Kleymyonov	Communists of Russia	16,125	7.93%
Aleksandr Borisov	New People	14,434	7.10%
Dmitry Karpov	Liberal Democratic Party	13,819	6.89%
Marina Belova	Yabloko	9,408	4.62%
Aleksandr Antonov	Party of Growth	7,786	3.83%
Oleg Melnikov	Russian Party of Freedom and Justice	3,982	1.96%
Total		203,421	100%

=== 2026 ===
Summary of the 18-20 September 2026 Russian legislative election in the Tver constituency
Candidate	Party	Votes	%
Alena Arshinova	United Russia	98,472	45.14%
Oleg Lebedev	Communist Party	29,759	13.64%
Dmitry Levshukov	New People	22,360	10.25%
Dmitry Karpov	Liberal Democratic Party	20,148	9.24%
Viktor Kuznetsov	Party of Pensioners	11,996	5.50%
Sergey Rogozin	A Just Russia	10,770	4.94%
Ilya Kleymyonov	Communists of Russia	8,571	3.93%
Aleksandr Dolgushin	The Greens	3,776	1.73%
Vladimir Tarasov	Rodina	2,733	1.25%
Total		218,125	100%
