= Sergei Golubev =

- Сергей Голубев

Chairman of the Legislative Assembly of Tver Oblast
- Incumbent
- Assumed office 29 September 2016
- Preceded by: Andrei Yepishin

Personal details
- Born: 14 August 1961 (age 65) Prusokhovo, Zharkovsky District, Kalinin Oblast, Russian SFSR, Soviet Union
- Party: United Russia
- Education: Kalinin State University
- Awards: Order of Friendship

Sergei Anatolyevich Golubev (Russian: Сергей Анатольевич Голубев; born 14 August 1961, in Prusokhovo, Kalinin Oblast) is a Russian historian, political figure, and Chairman of the Legislative Assembly of Tver Oblast (since September 2016). He has been a member of the United Russia party since 2002 and serves in the leadership of its regional branch.

From 2018 to 2020, he was a member of the Council of Legislators of the Russian Federation and Deputy Chairman of the Council of Legislators of the Central Federal District, a role he resumed in October 2022. From 2021 to 2022, he headed the Council of Legislators of the Central Federal District.

== Biography ==
Sergey Anatolyevich Golubev was born on August 14, 1961, in the village of Prusokhovo, Zharkovsky District, Kalinin Oblast (now Tver Oblast).

In 1984, he graduated from Kalinin State University with a degree in history.

He taught at the Faculty of History of Tver State University.

In 1994, he defended his dissertation titled "Right-wing and Liberal Political Parties of Russia and the Polish Question (1905 – February 1917)" and holds the academic degree of Candidate of Historical Sciences.

From 1994 to 2002, he served as Head of the Department of Modern and Contemporary History at Tver State University and held the academic rank of Associate Professor (dotsent).

From 2002 to 2004, he served as the head of the executive committee of the Tver regional branch of United Russia.

In 2004, he transitioned to a position within the state government—the Office of the Governor of Tver Oblast. He was appointed Deputy Chief of Staff to Governor Dmitry Zelenin.

In September 2005, elections for the 4th convocation of the Legislative Assembly of Tver Oblast were scheduled, with the vote taking place on December 18, 2005. For the first time, the election was held using a mixed majoritarian-proportional system: of the 33 deputies, 16 were elected from single-member constituencies, and 17 from a single multi-member constituency via party lists. Golubev was nominated as part of the United Russia party list, where he was placed 4th—following Dmitry Zelenin, Vladimir Vasilyev, and Vladimir Babichev. With a voter turnout of 34.25%, the party received 33.23% of the vote and secured 7 seats. One of these seats was assigned to Golubev. Within the Legislative Assembly, he joined the United Russia faction and also served as Deputy Chair of the Standing Committee on State Structure and Local Self-Government. He also acted as the leader of the "United Russia" faction.

In 2008, he assumed the position of Deputy Chair of the Legislative Assembly of Tver Oblast.

On June 29, 2010, together with other members of the United Russia faction, he participated in the planting of the Partisan Alley in Tver, near the Palace of Children and Youth. This event coincided with the first-ever observance in Russia of the "Day of Partisans and Underground Fighters", a commemorative date established by President Dmitry Medvedev.

On March 13, 2011, elections for the 5th convocation of the Legislative Assembly took place. Golubev won in the Staritsky single-member constituency. In the 5th convocation of the Legislative Assembly, he retained his position as deputy chairman.

In 2013, following the introduction of the post of First Deputy Chairman (Speaker) of the Legislative Assembly, he assumed this role[7].

In May 2016, he participated in the inaugural meeting of the Tver Oblast Election Commission for the 2016–2021 term[8].

On September 18, 2016, elections were held for deputies of the 6th convocation of the Legislative Assembly. Golubev won once again in the Staritsky single-mandate constituency, securing 68% of the vote.

On October 3, 2016, at the first session of the 6th convocation, he was elected Chairman of the Legislative Assembly[9].

On September 19, 2021, elections took place for the 7th convocation of the Legislative Assembly. The 40 deputies were elected under a mixed electoral system (20+20). Golubev was nominated by the United Russia party for constituency No. 20 (comprising the Zubtsovsky District, Oleninsky District, Selizharovsky District and Staritsky District). He received 60.2% of the vote and was elected as a deputy.

In the 7th convocation of the Legislative Assembly, Sergey Golubev was elected chairman for a second term.
