= 2026 Tver Oblast legislative election =

Regional legislative election in Russia

- 18–20 September 2026

All 40 seats in the Legislative Assembly 21 seats needed for a majority
- Turnout: 46.14% ▲4.41 pp
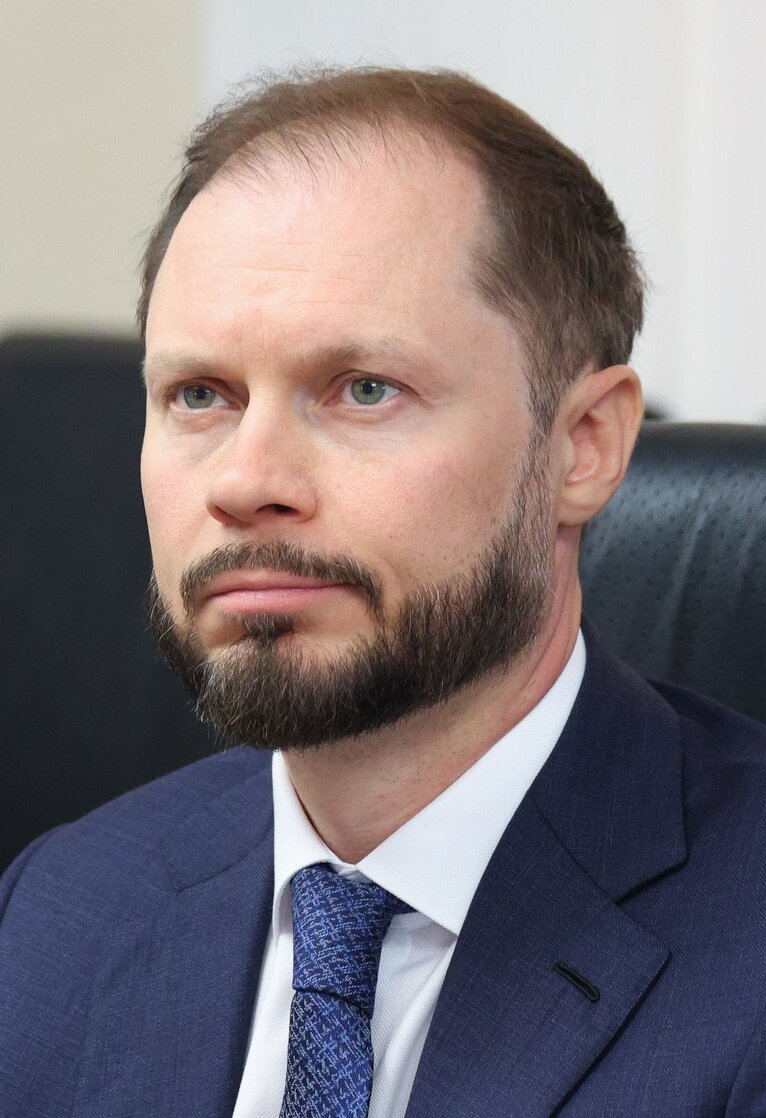

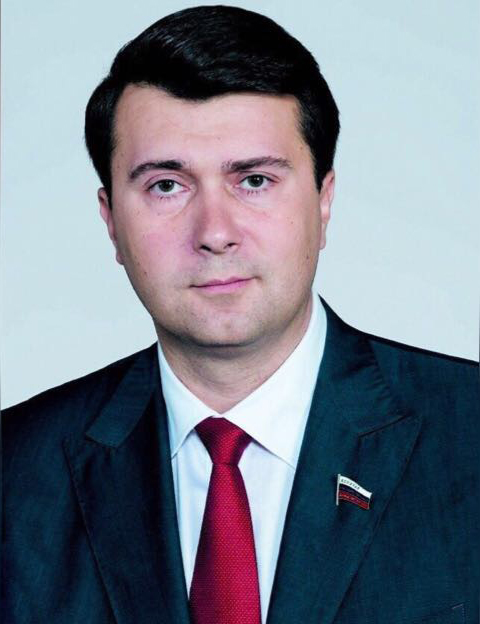

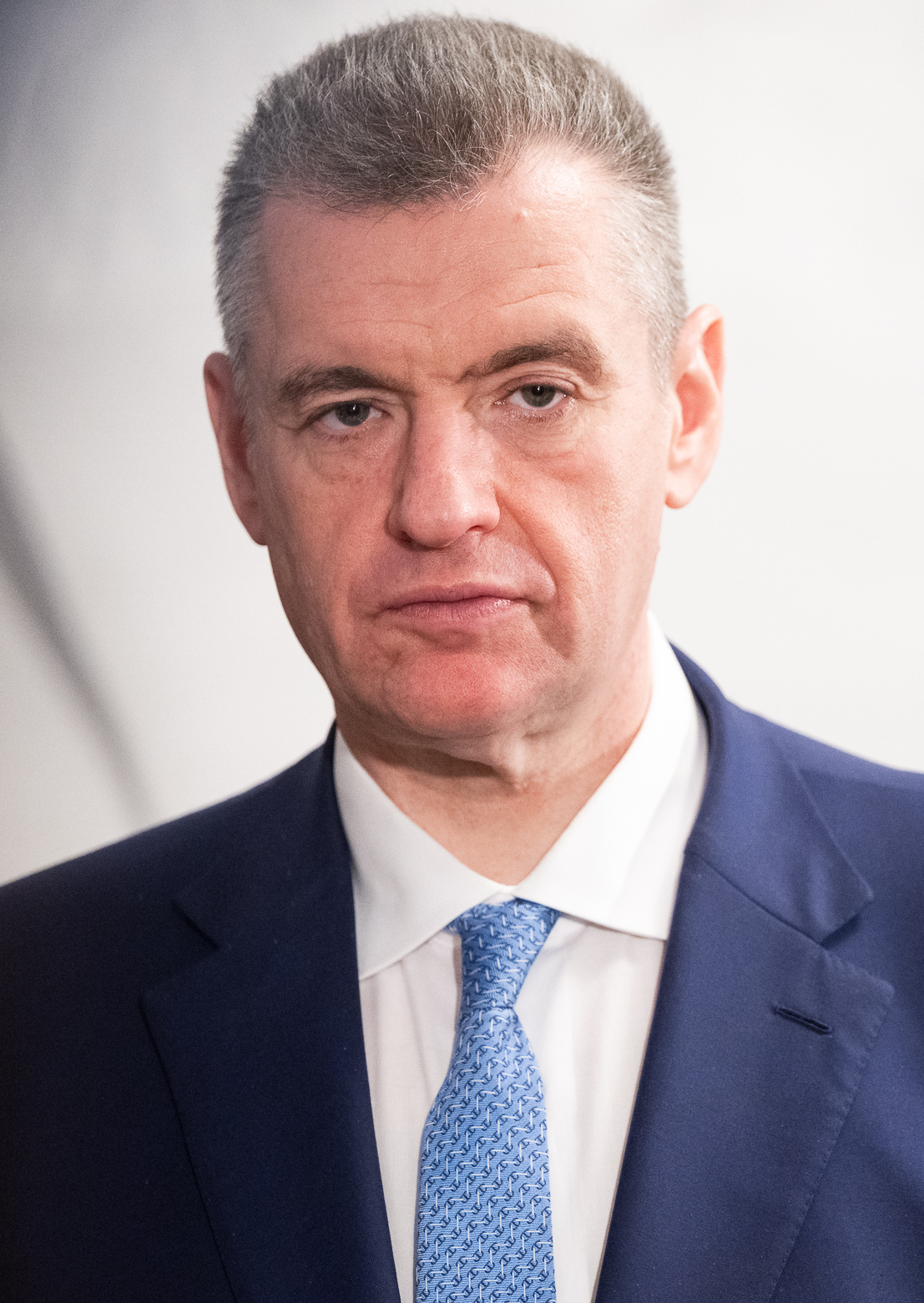
	Majority party	Minority party
Candidate	Vitaly Korolyov	Oleg Lebedev
Party	United Russia	CPRF
Last election	35.43%, 29 seats	21.54%, 5 seats
Seats won	31	4
Seat change	▲2	▼1
Popular vote	204,333	78,150
Percentage	45.08%	17.24%
Swing	▲9.65 pp	▼4.30 pp
	Third party	Fourth party
	NL
Candidate	Dmitry Levshukov	Leonid Slutsky
Party	New People	LDPR
Last election	Failed to qualify	11.23%, 3 seats
Seats won	3	2
Seat change	New	▼1
Popular vote	54,866	49,510
Percentage	12.11%	10.92%
Swing	New	▼0.31 pp
Chairman before election
Sergey Golubev
United Russia
Elected Chairman
Sergey Golubev
United Russia
Senator before election
Andrei Yepishin
United Russia
Senator after election
Andrei Yepishin
United Russia

The 2026 Legislative Assembly of Tver Oblast election took place on 18–20 September 2026, on common election day, coinciding with the 2026 Tver Oblast gubernatorial election and the 2026 Russian legislative election. All 40 seats in the Legislative Assembly were up for re-election.

United Russia slightly increased its majority in the Legislative Assembly, winning 45.1% of the vote and all 20 single-mandate constituencies. Communist Party of the Russian Federation and Liberal Democratic Party of Russia retained their factions but lost one deputy each. New People entered the Legislative Assembly for the first time, winning 12.1% of the vote and three party-list seats. A Just Russia and Russian Party of Pensioners for Social Justice failed to cross the 5% threshold and lost their factions.

== Electoral system ==
Under current election laws, the Legislative Assembly is elected for a term of five years, with parallel voting. 20 seats are elected by party-list proportional representation with a 5% electoral threshold, with the other half elected in 20 single-member constituencies by first-past-the-post voting. Seats in the proportional part are allocated using the Imperiali quota, modified to ensure that every party list, which passes the threshold, receives at least one mandate.

== Candidates ==
=== Party lists ===
To register regional lists of candidates, parties need to collect 0.5% of signatures of all registered voters in Tver Oblast.

The following parties were relieved from the necessity to collect signatures:

- United Russia
- Communist Party of the Russian Federation
- Liberal Democratic Party of Russia
- A Just Russia
- New People
- Russian Party of Pensioners for Social Justice
- Communists of Russia
- Rodina

№	Party	Oblast-wide list	Candidates	Territorial groups	Status
1	New People	Dmitry Levshukov • Yekaterina Pikalyova • Maria Safronova • Arseny Kizelbash • Yekaterina Glushkova	97	19	Registered
2	Communist Party	Oleg Lebedev • Lyudmila Vorobyova • Vadim Lukyanov • Stepan Belov	90	20	Registered
3	Communists of Russia	Ilya Kleymyonov • Sergey Malinkovich • Vera Bogacheva	98	20	Registered
4	United Russia	Vitaly Korolyov • Vladimir Vasilyev • Alena Arshinova • Aleksey Konovalov • Andrei Yepishin	87	20	Registered
5	Party of Pensioners	Erik Prazdnikov • Viktor Kuznetsov • Maya Moreva • Vladimir Vorozhtsov • Vladimir Koshelev	35	10	Registered
6	Liberal Democratic Party	Leonid Slutsky • Eleonora Kavshar • Dmitry Karpov	59	20	Registered
7	Rodina	~~Maksim Larin~~ • Vadim Deshyovkin • Ilya Ryabenkov • Andrey Fedotov • Viktoria Kosenkova	42	13	Registered
8	A Just Russia	Alexey Chepa • Eduard Belykh • Vladimir Golbert • Artyom Goncharov	63	20	Registered

Yabloko, which participated in the last election, did not file.

=== Single-mandate constituencies ===
20 single-mandate constituencies were formed in Tver Oblast. To register candidates in single-mandate constituencies need to collect 3% of signatures of registered voters in the constituency.

Number of candidates in single-mandate constituencies
Party	Candidates	
Party	Nominated	Registered
United Russia	20	20
Communist Party	20	19
Liberal Democratic Party	18	17
A Just Russia	20	18
Party of Pensioners	6	6
Communists of Russia	2	2
New People	18	17
Total	104	99

== Results ==
=== Results by party lists ===
Summary of the 18–20 September 2026 Legislative Assembly of Tver Oblast election results
Party	Party list					Constituency		Total	
Party	Votes	%	±pp	Seats	+/–	Seats	+/–	Seats	+/–
United Russia	204,333	45.08	▲9.65	11	▲2	20	Steady	31	▲2
Communist Party	78,150	17.24	▼4.30	4	▼1	0	Steady	4	▼1
New People	54,866	12.11	New	3	New	0	New	3	New
Liberal Democratic Party	49,510	10.92	▼0.31	2	▼1	0	Steady	2	▼1
A Just Russia	20,354	4.49	▼6.66	0	▼2	0	Steady	0	▼2
Party of Pensioners	19,177	4.23	▼1.78	0	▼1	0	Steady	0	▼1
Communists of Russia	7,462	1.65	▼2.71	0	Steady	0	Steady	0	Steady
Rodina	4,768	1.05	▼3.92	0	Steady	—	—	0	Steady
Invalid ballots	14,623	3.23	▼0.31	—	—	—	—	—	—
Total	453,243	100.00	—	20	Steady	20	Steady	40	Steady
Turnout	453,680	46.14	▲4.41	—	—	—	—	—	—
Registered voters	983,341	100.00	—	—	—	—	—	—	—

Sergey Golubev (United Russia) was re-elected as Chairman of the Legislative Assembly, while incumbent Senator Andrei Yepishin (United Russia) was re-appointed to the Federation Council.

=== Results in single-member constituencies ===
==== District 1 ====
Summary of the 18–20 September 2026 Legislative Assembly of Tver Oblast election in North-Western constituency No.1
Candidate	Party	Votes	%
Sergey Kozlov	United Russia	7,178	33.56%
Pavel Korolev	Liberal Democratic Party	5,677	26.54%
Yevgeny Rasskazov	Communist Party	3,560	16.64%
Aleksandr Pilguy	New People	2,735	12.79%
Olga Ryabova	A Just Russia	1,359	6.35%
Total		21,391	100%

==== District 2 ====
Summary of the 18–20 September 2026 Legislative Assembly of Tver Oblast in Privolzhsky constituency No.2
Candidate	Party	Votes	%
Oleg Lebedev (incumbent)	United Russia	9,076	42.90%
Olga Luchnikova	Communist Party	4,401	20.80%
Mikhail Panyukov	New People	3,357	15.87%
Aleksandr Parfenovich	Liberal Democratic Party	1,903	8.99%
Tatyana Gagkayeva	A Just Russia	1,559	7.37%
Total		21,158	100%

==== District 3 ====
Summary of the 18–20 September 2026 Legislative Assembly of Tver Oblast in Central constituency No.3
Candidate	Party	Votes	%
Aleksandr Klinovsky (incumbent)	United Russia	6,106	29.72%
Olga Timoshkevich	Communist Party	4,309	20.97%
Arseny Kizelbash	New People	3,407	16.58%
Oleg Smirnov	Liberal Democratic Party	3,162	15.39%
Elvira Papina	A Just Russia	1,631	7.94%
Nikita Tveritnev	Party of Pensioners	859	4.18%
Total		20,544	100%

==== District 4 ====
Summary of the 18–20 September 2026 Legislative Assembly of Tver Oblast in Moskovsky constituency No.4
Candidate	Party	Votes	%
Natalya Sokolova	United Russia	6,841	36.00%
Andrey Uvikov	Communist Party	5,392	28.37%
Maria Safronova	New People	3,696	19.45%
Anzhelika Volkova	A Just Russia	2,196	11.55%
Total		19,005	100%

==== District 5 ====
Summary of the 18–20 September 2026 Legislative Assembly of Tver Oblast in Proletarsky constituency No.5
Candidate	Party	Votes	%
Irina Tyuryakova	United Russia	7,488	38.61%
Leonty Semyonov	Communist Party	4,267	22.00%
Nikita Tolstoy	New People	2,770	14.28%
Artyom Tatarkin	Liberal Democratic Party	2,262	11.66%
Gennady Chukovin	A Just Russia	1,558	8.03%
Total		19,393	100%

==== District 6 ====
Summary of the 18–20 September 2026 Legislative Assembly of Tver Oblast in Southern constituency No.6
Candidate	Party	Votes	%
Roman Serebryakov	United Russia	6,472	31.54%
Vladislav Vorvulev	Communist Party	3,690	17.98%
Konstantin Shumakov	Liberal Democratic Party	3,307	16.11%
Konstantin Kan	New People	3,237	15.77%
Svetlana Duksova	Party of Pensioners	1,476	7.19%
Sergey Rogozin	A Just Russia	1,430	6.97%
Total		20,523	100%

==== District 7 ====
Summary of the 18–20 September 2026 Legislative Assembly of Tver Oblast in Konakovsky constituency No.7
Candidate	Party	Votes	%
Aleksandr Slepyshev (incumbent)	United Russia	19,408	61.37%
Gennady Sadykov	Communist Party	3,768	11.92%
Mikhail Adyshev	New People	3,171	10.03%
Vadim Noskov	Liberal Democratic Party	2,833	8.96%
Vadim Solovyov	A Just Russia	1,327	4.20%
Total		31,623	100%

==== District 8 ====
Summary of the 18–20 September 2026 Legislative Assembly of Tver Oblast in Kalininsky constituency No.8
Candidate	Party	Votes	%
Aleksandr Kharchenko	United Russia	8,520	36.83%
Nikolay Diyev	Communist Party	5,123	22.14%
Yevgeny Smirnov	New People	4,172	18.03%
Aleksandr Trubnikov	Liberal Democratic Party	2,609	11.28%
Aleksey Tikhomirov	A Just Russia	1,632	7.05%
Total		23,134	100%

==== District 9 ====
Summary of the 18–20 September 2026 Legislative Assembly of Tver Oblast in Vyshnevolotsky constituency No.9
Candidate	Party	Votes	%
Artur Babushkin (incumbent)	United Russia	7,909	34.59%
Vadim Ulyanov	Communist Party	5,445	23.81%
Oksana Yakovleva	New People	4,847	21.20%
Aleksey Matrosov	Liberal Democratic Party	2,006	8.77%
Maksim Kosteyev	A Just Russia	1,513	6.62%
Total		22,865	100%

==== District 10 ====
Summary of the 18–20 September 2026 Legislative Assembly of Tver Oblast in Likhoslavlsky constituency No.10
Candidate	Party	Votes	%
Sergey Aksenov (incumbent)	United Russia	15,733	56.02%
Mikhail Suvorov	Communist Party	3,446	12.27%
Aleksey Smirnov	Liberal Democratic Party	2,832	10.08%
Natalya Mayorova	A Just Russia	2,278	8.11%
Vladimir Fedulov	New People	2,206	7.85%
Ivan Chizhov	Communists of Russia	611	2.18%
Total		28,086	100%

==== District 11 ====
Summary of the 18–20 September 2026 Legislative Assembly of Tver Oblast in Rzhevsky constituency No.11
Candidate	Party	Votes	%
Viktor Konstantinov (incumbent)	United Russia	8,545	38.98%
Artyom Goncharov	A Just Russia	4,736	21.60%
Dmitry Ivanov	New People	3,667	16.73%
Oleg Tsukanov	Communist Party	3,130	14.28%
Mikhail Pyshin	Party of Pensioners	905	4.13%
Total		21,921	100%

==== District 12 ====
Summary of the 18–20 September 2026 Legislative Assembly of Tver Oblast in Kimrsky constituency No.12
Candidate	Party	Votes	%
Irina Mironova	United Russia	11,460	58.83%
Eduard Beloglazov	Communist Party	3,231	16.59%
Ivan Stulov	Party of Pensioners	1,440	7.39%
Igor Khokhlov	Liberal Democratic Party	1,262	6.48%
Andrey Istomin	A Just Russia	1,232	6.32%
Total		19,479	100%

==== District 13 ====
Summary of the 18–20 September 2026 Legislative Assembly of Tver Oblast in Torzhoksky constituency No.13
Candidate	Party	Votes	%
Maksim Pilyushkin (incumbent)	United Russia	9,852	50.74%
Valentina Aleksandrova	Communist Party	4,504	23.20%
Galina Arsentyeva	New People	3,291	16.95%
Valery Gusev	A Just Russia	1,133	5.84%
Total		19,415	100%

==== District 14 ====
Summary of the 18–20 September 2026 Legislative Assembly of Tver Oblast in Udomelsky constituency No.14
Candidate	Party	Votes	%
Oleg Lebedev	United Russia	12,579	57.07%
Dmitry Larionov	Communist Party	5,842	26.50%
Sergey Obraztsov	Liberal Democratic Party	2,818	12.78%
Total		22,042	100%

==== District 15 ====
Summary of the 18–20 September 2026 Legislative Assembly of Tver Oblast in Bologovsky constituency No.15
Candidate	Party	Votes	%
Vladislav Yain	United Russia	10,532	47.07%
Maksim Sobolev	New People	3,856	17.23%
Sergey Malinkovich	Communists of Russia	2,727	12.19%
Vyacheslav Matrosov	Liberal Democratic Party	2,440	10.90%
Roman Khan	Party of Pensioners	1,601	7.15%
Total		22,376	100%

==== District 16 ====
Summary of the 18–20 September 2026 Legislative Assembly of Tver Oblast in Bezhetsky constituency No.16
Candidate	Party	Votes	%
Kirill Nikolayev	United Russia	6,460	33.53%
Igor Alekseyev	New People	4,689	24.34%
Tatyana Tsevtkova	Liberal Democratic Party	2,758	14.32%
Dmitry Koslavsky	Communist Party	2,653	13.77%
Vladimir Baksht	A Just Russia	1,948	10.11%
Total		19,264	100%

==== District 17 ====
Summary of the 18–20 September 2026 Legislative Assembly of Tver Oblast in Nelidovsky constituency No.17
Candidate	Party	Votes	%
Ruslan Lebedev (incumbent)	United Russia	10,189	48.17%
Sergey Prints	A Just Russia	3,406	16.10%
Leonid Bulatov	Liberal Democratic Party	2,873	13.58%
Valentina Sboynova	Communist Party	2,866	13.55%
Yekaterina Zelenina	Party of Pensioners	1,108	5.24%
Total		21,152	100%

==== District 18 ====
Summary of the 18–20 September 2026 Legislative Assembly of Tver Oblast in Ostashkovsky constituency No.18
Candidate	Party	Votes	%
Yury Serougolnikov	United Russia	9,707	43.88%
Lyudmila Vorobyova	Communist Party	4,074	18.42%
Olga Purdinen	New People	2,639	11.93%
Natalya Yudina	A Just Russia	2,370	10.71%
Pavel Ivashkin	Liberal Democratic Party	2,208	9.98%
Total		22,121	100%

==== District 19 ====
Summary of the 18–20 September 2026 Legislative Assembly of Tver Oblast in Kashinsky constituency No.19
Candidate	Party	Votes	%
Sergey Veremeenko	United Russia	7,449	35.79%
Natalia Vdovina	Liberal Democratic Party	4,918	23.63%
Andrey Kalinin	Communist Party	4,135	19.87%
Stanislav Yezersky	New People	1,637	7.87%
Leonid Solomko	A Just Russia	1,664	6.00%
Total		20,813	100%

==== District 20 ====
Summary of the 18–20 September 2026 Legislative Assembly of Tver Oblast in Staritsky constituency No.20
Candidate	Party	Votes	%
Sergey Golubev (incumbent)	United Russia	20,395	70.83%
Aleksey Zhuravlev	Communist Party	3,518	12.22%
Yury Demidov	A Just Russia	1,632	5.67%
Anatoly Kuznetsov	Liberal Democratic Party	1,361	4.73%
Vladislav Khomyachenkov	New People	1,302	4.52%
Total		28,793	100%

=== Members ===
Incumbent deputies are highlighted with bold, elected members who declined to take a seat are marked with ~~strikethrough~~.

Constituency
No.	Member	Party
1	Sergey Kozlov	United Russia
2	Oleg Lebedev	United Russia
3	Aleksandr Klinovsky	United Russia
4	Natalya Sokolova	United Russia
5	Irina Tyuryakova	United Russia
6	Roman Serebryakov	United Russia
7	Aleksandr Slepyshev	United Russia
8	Aleksandr Kharchenko	United Russia
9	Artur Babushkin	United Russia
10	Sergey Aksenov	United Russia
11	Viktor Konstantinov	United Russia
12	Irina Mironova	United Russia
13	Maksim Pilyushkin	United Russia
14	Oleg Lebedev	United Russia
15	Vladislav Yain	United Russia
16	Kirill Nikolayev	United Russia
17	Ruslan Lebedev	United Russia
18	Yury Serougolnikov	United Russia
19	Sergey Veremeenko	United Russia
20	Sergey Golubev	United Russia

Party lists
Member	Party
~~Vitaly Korolyov~~	United Russia
~~Vladimir Vasilyev~~	United Russia
~~Alena Arshinova~~	United Russia
Aleksey Konovalov	United Russia
Andrei Yepishin	United Russia
~~Tatyana Dubova~~	United Russia
Irina Bubnova	United Russia
Dmitry Berdnikov	United Russia
~~Irina Belova~~	United Russia
Valentin Goryachov	United Russia
Aleksandr Kushnarev	United Russia
Anatoly Yelkin	United Russia
Magomed Gabibov	United Russia
Aleksey Dimakov	United Russia
Khristofor Chistyakov	United Russia
Konstantin Antonov	United Russia
~~Oleg Lebedev~~	Communist Party
Lyudmila Vorobyova	Communist Party
Vadim Lukyanov	Communist Party
Stepan Belov	Communist Party
Olga Timoshkevich	Communist Party
Dmitry Levshukov	New People
Yekaterina Pikalyova	New People
Maria Safronova	New People
~~Leonid Slutsky~~	Liberal Democratic Party
~~Eleonora Kavshar~~	Liberal Democratic Party
Dmitry Karpov	Liberal Democratic Party
Natalia Vdovina	Liberal Democratic Party

== See also ==
- 2026 Russian regional elections
