= Dmitry Vadimovich Zelenin =

Dmitry Zelenin
- Дмитрий Зеленин
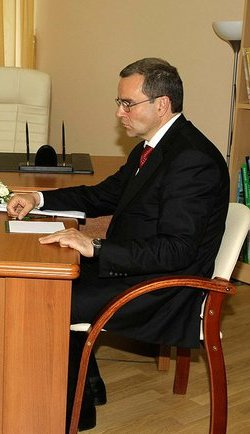
- Zelenin in 2010

3rd Governor of Tver Oblast
- In office 30 December 2003 – 16 June 2011
- Preceded by: Vladimir Platov
- Succeeded by: Andrey Shevelyov

Personal details
- Born: Dmitry Vadimovich Zelenin; 27 November 1962 (age 63) Moscow, Russian SFSR, Soviet Union
- Party: United Russia

Dmitry Vadimovich Zelenin (Russian: Дми́трий Вади́мович Зеле́нин; born 27 November 1962) is a Russian businessman and politician. During 2003-2011 he was governor of Tver Oblast, Russia.

== Biography ==
Zelenin graduated from the Moscow Institute of Physics and Technology (Phystech) in 1986 and worked in the electronics industry until 1990 when he became commercial director of Resurs Bank and chief executive of this bank in 1995.

Zelenin was one of the top managers of Norilsk Nickel having joined in 1996 as first deputy general director. This company is one of the largest nickel producers in the world.

Dmitry Zelenin was elected governor of Tver Oblast in December 2003, bypassing incumbent Vladimir Platov, MVD officer Igor Zubov and communist Tatyana Astrakhankina. He was appointed for a second term by president Vladimir Putin in July 2007. In 2010, Zelenin caused a scandal when he posted photos of a salad containing an earthworm on his Twitter account, which was allegedly served to German President Christian Wulff. Sergei Prikhodko, foreign policy adviser to president Dmitry Medvedev, then asked him to resign. Zelenin resigned as governor in June 2011. The main reason was not the Kremlin incident, but the result of the Legislative Assembly election, where United Russia party suffered its second-worst electoral performance in the 2011 regional elections.

Zelenin is married with two daughters and a son.
