= Orsha, Russia =

Orsha (Russian: Орша) is the name of several inhabited localities in Russia.

== Modern localities ==
Urban localities

- Orsha (urban-type settlement), Tver Oblast, an urban-type settlement in Kalininsky District of Tver Oblast

Rural localities

- Orsha, Mari El Republic, a selo in Vyatsky Rural Okrug of Sovetsky District in the Mari El Republic; 56°54′N 48°30′E
- Orsha, Pskov Oblast, a village in Novorzhevsky District of Pskov Oblast
- Orsha (rural locality), Tver Oblast, a village in Kablukovskoye Rural Settlement of Kalininsky District in Tver Oblast

== Alternative names ==
- Orsha, alternative name of Bolshaya Orsha, a village in Bolsheorshinsky Rural Okrug of Orshansky District in the Mari El Republic; 56°55′N 47°50′E
