= Yulia Saranova =

Russian politician

- Юлия Саранова
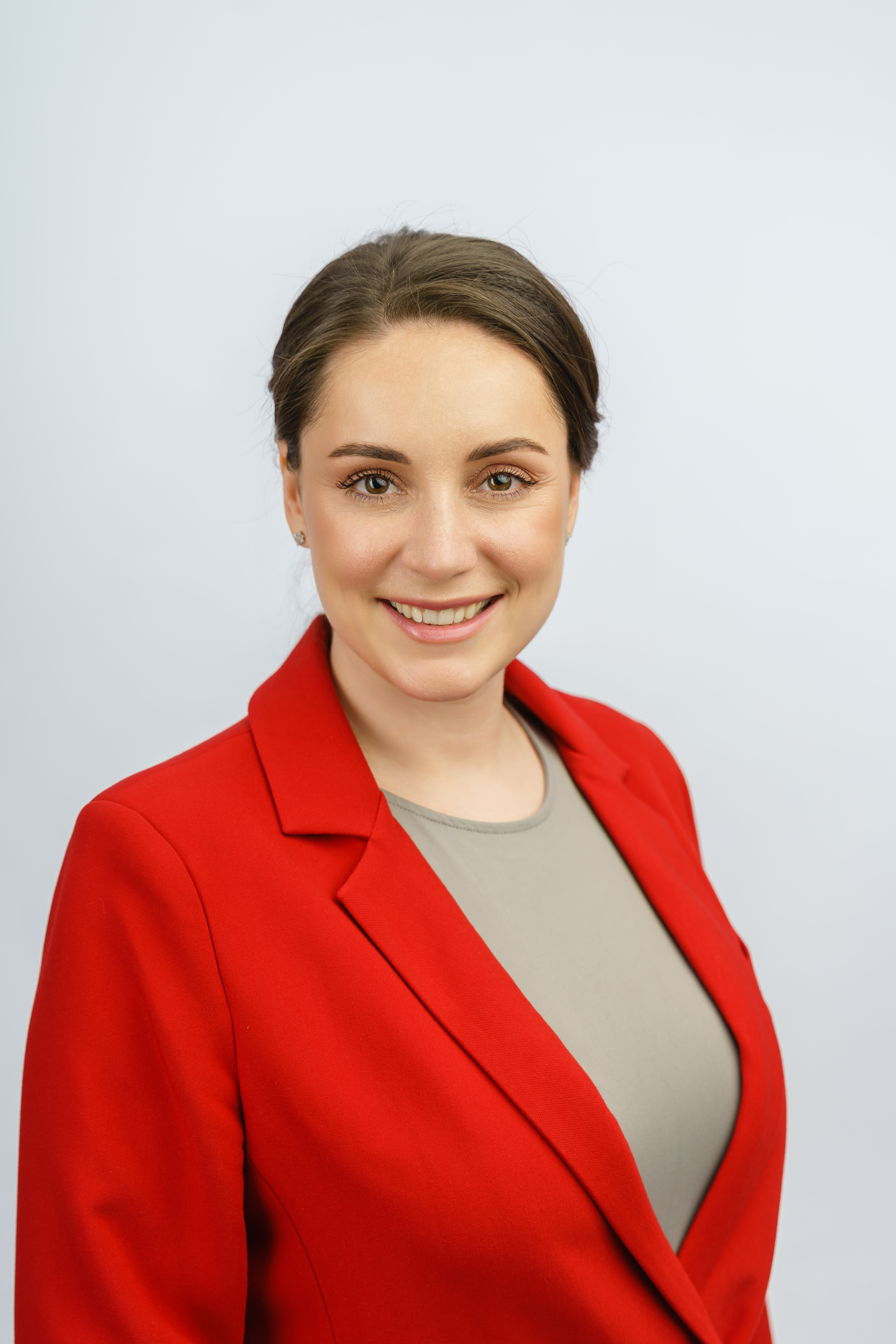

Member of the State Duma for Tver Oblast
- Incumbent
- Assumed office 12 October 2021
- Preceded by: Svetlana Maksimova
- Constituency: Tver (No. 179)

Personal details
- Born: 21 October 1988 (age 37) Volgograd, RSFSR, USSR
- Party: United Russia
- Education: Tver State University

Yulia Vldimirovna Saranova (Russian: Юлия Владимировна Саранова; born 21 October 1988) is a Russian political figure and deputy of the 8th State Duma.

== Biography ==
Yulia Saranova was born on 21 October 1988, in Volgograd. In 2010, she graduated from the Faculty of Philology at Tver State University.

From 2012 to 2018, Saranova was a member of the Public Chamber of Tver. In 2013-2020, she was the director of the Tver Center for NGOs in the Association for the Development of Civil Society "Institute for Regional Development". In 2017, Saranova started teaching at the Faculty of Geography and Geoecology, Department of Political Science, Institute of Economics and Management of the Tver State University. Since September 2021, she has served as deputy of the 8th State Duma representing Tver Oblast's Tver constituency. In the 2026 United Russia primary, Saranova did not stand for reelection from Tver, instead submitting her candidacy for the regional legislature.

== Sanctions ==
She was sanctioned by the UK government in 2022 in relation to the Russo-Ukrainian War.
