= Zavolzhsky constituency =

Russian legislative constituency

Zavolzhsky single-member constituency
- Constituency of the Russian State Duma

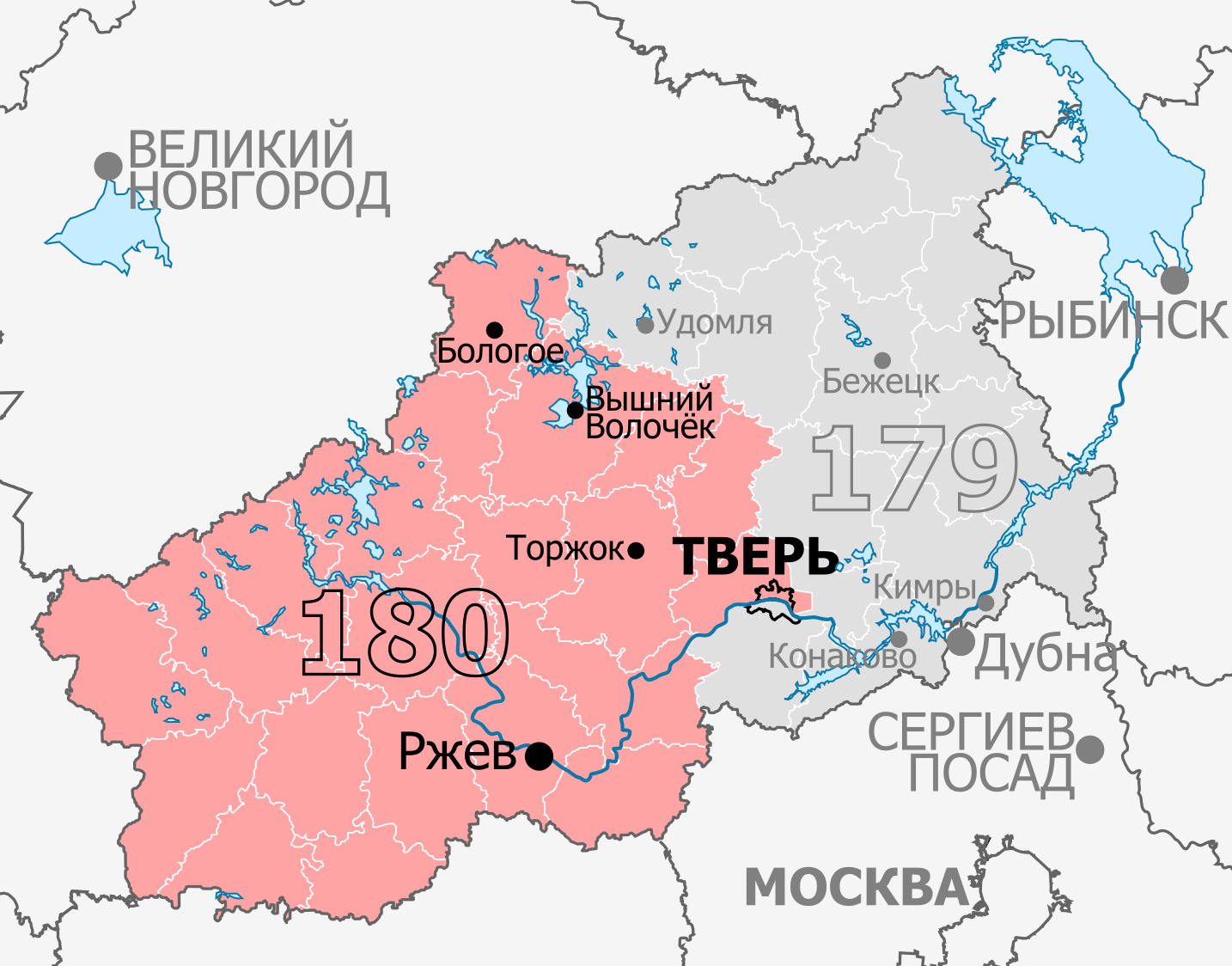
- Constituency boundaries since 2016
- Deputy: Vladimir Vasilyev; United Russia
- Federal subject: Tver Oblast
- Districts: Tver City (Zavolzhsky district), ZATO Ozyorny, ZATO Solnechny, Torzhok City, Rzhev City, Andreapolsky, Belsky, Bologovsky, Vyshnevolotsky, Zharkovsky, Zapadnodvinsky, Zubtsovsky, Kalininsky (north and north-west), Kuvshinovsky, Likhoslavlsky, Nelidovsky, Oleninsky, Ostashkovsky, Penovsky, Rzhevsky, Selizharovsky, Spirovsky, Staritsky, Torzhoksky, Toropetsky, Firovsky
- Voters: 488,270 (2026)

The Zavolzhsky constituency (No.179 (Note: No.180 in 2016–2026)) is a Russian legislative constituency in the Tver Oblast. The constituency covers part of Tver on the left bank of the Volga river as well as central and western Tver Oblast, including the towns Rzhev, Bologoye, Torzhok and Vyshny Volochyok.

The constituency has been represented since 2021 by United Russia deputy Vladimir Vasilyev, former four-term State Duma member for this seat and Head of the Republic of Dagestan, who won the open seat, succeeding one-term United Russia incumbent Sergey Veremeenko after the latter successfully sought re-election only through party-list representation. Vasilyev has served as Deputy Chairman of the State Duma since September 2026.

== Boundaries ==
2016–present: Andreapolsky District, Belsky District, Bologovsky District, Firovsky District, Kalininsky District (Avvakumovskoye, Chernogubovskoye, Kulitskoye, Mednovskoye, Mikhaylovskoye, Vasilyevsky Mokh, Zavolzhskoye), Kuvshinovsky District, Likhoslavlsky District, Nelidovsky District, Oleninsky District, Ostashkovsky District, Ozyorny, Penovsky District, Rzhev, Rzhevsky District, Selizharovsky District, Solnechny, Spirovsky District, Staritsky District, Torzhok, Torzhoksky District, Toropetsky District, Tver (Zavolzhsky), Vyshnevolotsky District, Zharkovsky District, Zapadnodvinsky District, Zubtsovsky District
The constituency was created for the 2016 election, taking northern part of Tver, its suburbs and western Tver Oblast from Tver constituency as well as central Tver Oblast from the dissolved Bezhetsk constituency.

== Members elected ==
Election	Member	Party
2016	Vladimir Vasilyev (Note: appointed as Head of the Republic of Dagestan in October 2017)	United Russia
2018	Sergey Veremeenko	United Russia
2021	Vladimir Vasilyev	United Russia
2026	Vladimir Vasilyev	United Russia

== Election results ==
=== 2016 ===
Summary of the 18 September 2016 Russian legislative election in the Zavolzhsky constituency
Candidate	Party	Votes	%
Vladimir Vasilyev	United Russia	125,812	53.03%
Artyom Goncharov	Communist Party	34,052	14.35%
Vladimir Barastov	Liberal Democratic Party	25,594	10.79%
Timur Kanokov	A Just Russia	15,254	6.43%
Marina Belova	People's Freedom Party	10,650	4.49%
Aleksandr Sorokin	Yabloko	7,314	3.08%
Dmitry Slitinsky	Communists of Russia	6,813	2.87%
Vadim Shklyar	Civilian Power	2,068	0.87%
Roman Komarnitsky	Civic Platform	1,755	0.74%
Total		237,250	100%

=== 2018 ===
Results by district: Sergey Veremeyenko: 20–30% 30–40% 40–50% 50–60% 60–70%; Vadim Solovyov: 20–30% 30–40%; Leonid Bulatov: 30–40%

Summary of the 9 September 2018 by-election in the Zavolzhsky constituency
Candidate	Party	Votes	%
Sergey Veremeenko	United Russia	47,263	36.21%
Vadim Solovyov	Communist Party	27,177	20.82%
Leonid Bulatov	Liberal Democratic Party	15,706	12.03%
Sergey Yurovsky	A Just Russia	13,521	10.36%
Aleksandr Grishin	Party of Pensioners	11,620	8.90%
Ilya Kleymyonov	Communists of Russia	9,301	7.13%
Total		130,523	100%

=== 2021 ===
Summary of the 17-19 September 2021 Russian legislative election in the Zavolzhsky constituency
Candidate	Party	Votes	%
Vladimir Vasilyev	United Russia	95,565	42.14%
Artyom Goncharov	Communist Party	45,135	19.90%
Dmitry Ignatkov	A Just Russia — For Truth	19,882	8.77%
Leonid Bulatov	Liberal Democratic Party	17,603	7.76%
Aleksandr Grishin	Party of Pensioners	13,660	6.02%
Dmitry Slitinsky	Communists of Russia	10,226	4.51%
Aleksandr Sorokin	Yabloko	8,152	3.59%
Pavel Sobolev	Russian Party of Freedom and Justice	5,667	2.50%
Total		226,794	100%

=== 2026 ===
Summary of the 18-20 September 2026 Russian legislative election in the Zavolzhsky constituency
Candidate	Party	Votes	%
Vladimir Vasilyev (incumbent)	United Russia	104,122	44.57%
Pavel Korolev	Liberal Democratic Party	40,637	17.40%
Nikolay Mishustin	Communist Party	30,687	13.14%
Yekaterina Glushkova	New People	21,869	9.36%
Artyom Goncharov	A Just Russia	13,281	5.69%
Daniil Timchenko	Yabloko	11,444	4.90%
Arseny Sterligov	Rodina	2,654	1.14%
Total		233,591	100%
