= Governor of Tver Oblast =

Highest-ranking official in Tver Oblast, Russia

Governor of Tver Oblast Губернатор Тверской области
- Flag of Tver Oblast

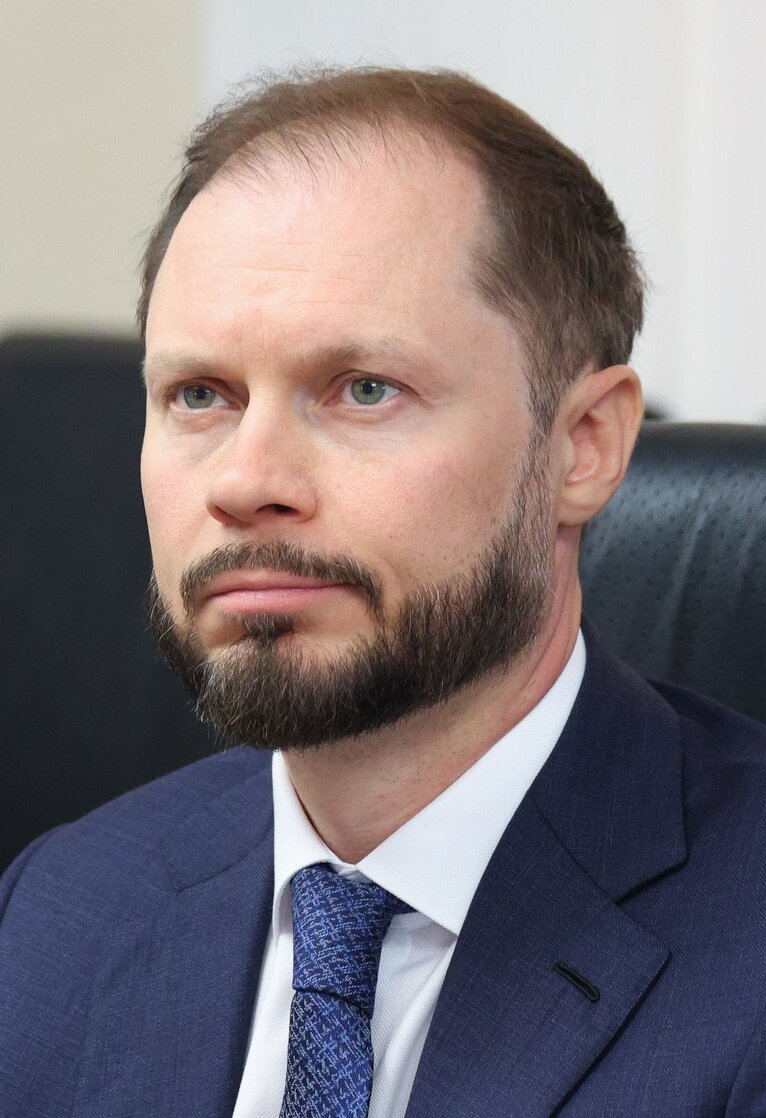
- Incumbent; Vitaly Korolyov since 5 November 2025
- Status: Head of Federal Subject
- Seat: Tver
- Nominator: Political parties
- Appointer: Direct popular vote
- Term length: five years, one consecutive re-election
- Constituting instrument: Charter of Tver Oblast, Section 5
- Formation: 1991
- First holder: Vladimir Suslov
- Website: tverreg.ru

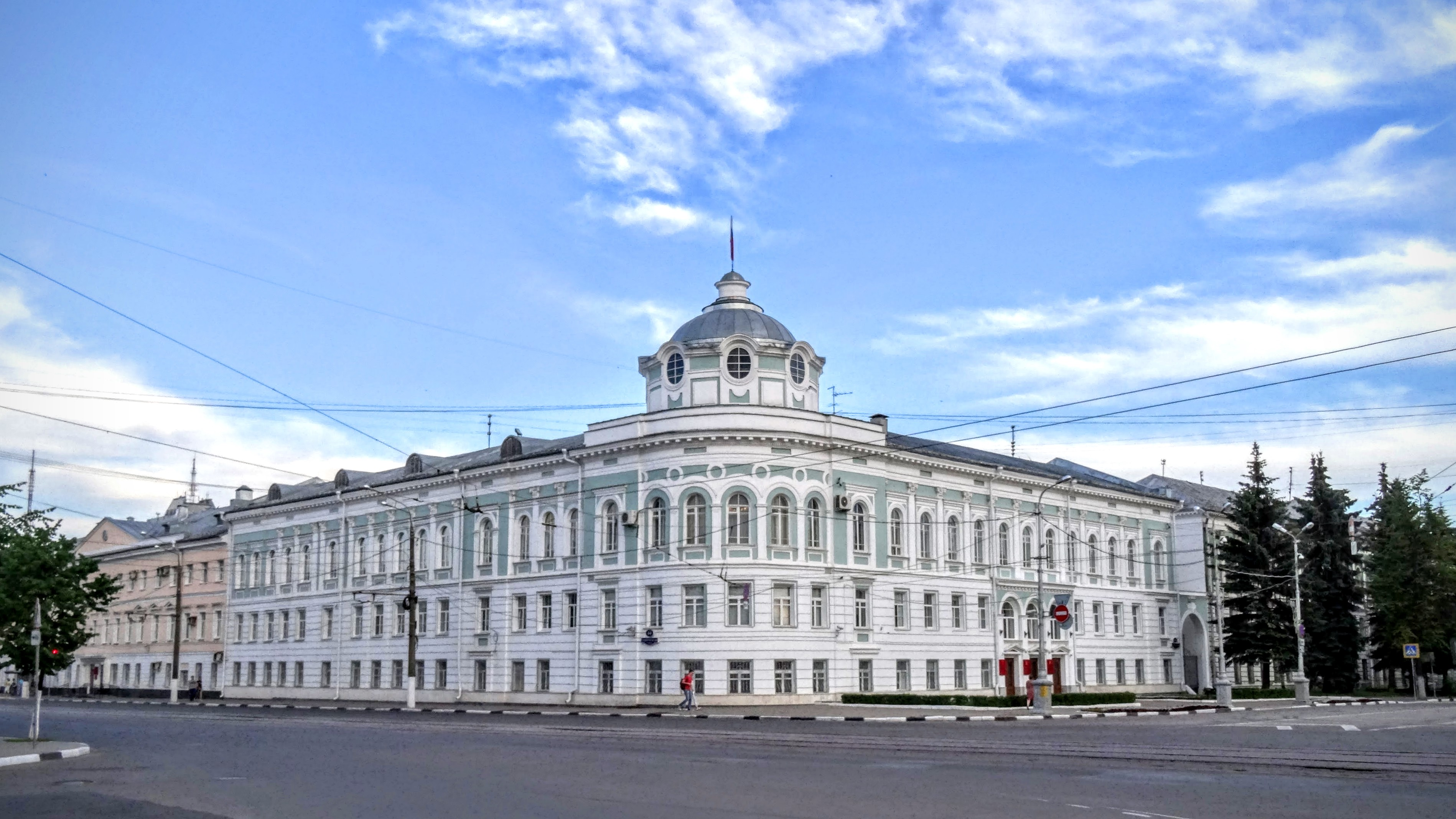
Building of Tver Oblast Administration and governor's residence

The Governor of Tver Oblast is the head of Tver Oblast, the federal subject of Russia. Governor is elected by the people of Tver Oblast for five years.

== List ==
No.	Portrait	Governor	Tenure	Time in office	Party	Election
1		Vladimir Suslov (born 1939)	20 October 1991 – 26 December 1995 (lost election)	4 years, 67 days	Independent (Note: Suslov's 1995 election campaign was supported by Our Home – Russia party.)	Appointed
2		Vladimir Platov (1946–2012)	26 December 1995 – 30 December 2003 (lost re-election)	8 years, 4 days	Independent (Note: Platov won his first term backed by "Narodovlastie" (People's Power), a big tent coalition unrelated to the eponymous federal parliamentary group. In 1999, he ran for State Duma from Unity party but refused to take seat in parliament.)	1995; 1999–2000
3		Dmitry Zelenin (born 1962)	30 December 2003 – 16 June 2011 (resigned)	7 years, 168 days	Independent → United Russia (Note: Elected as an independent backed by United Russia. In the party list for the 2005 legislative election Zelenin is mentioned as party member.)	2003; 2007 (Note: Appointed by the president of Russia with the consent of the Legislative Assembly.)
–		Andrey Shevelyov (born 1970)	16 June 2011 – 7 July 2011	4 years, 260 days	United Russia	Acting
4		Andrey Shevelyov (born 1970)	7 July 2011 – 2 March 2016 (resigned)	4 years, 260 days	United Russia	2011
–		Igor Rudenya (born 1968)	2 March 2016 – 23 September 2016	9 years, 211 days	United Russia	Acting
5		Igor Rudenya (born 1968)	23 September 2016 – 29 September 2025 (resigned)	9 years, 211 days	United Russia	2016; 2021
–		Marina Podtikhova (born 1971)	29 September 2025 – 5 November 2025	37 days	Unknown	Acting
–		Vitaly Korolyov (born 1980)	5 November 2025 – 24 September 2026	323 days	United Russia	Acting
6		Vitaly Korolyov (born 1980)	24 September 2026 – present	323 days	United Russia	2026

== Elections ==
=== 1995 ===
Candidate	Description	Votes	%
Vladimir Platov	Head of Bezhetsk and Bezhetsky District administration	442,920	50.50
Vladimir Suslov	Incumbent head of administration	308,399	35.16
Yury Dontsov	Entrepreneur	41,659	4.75
Viktor Linov	Chairman of Staritsky District consumers' co-operative	13,570	1.55
Against all		59,038	6.73
Invalid/blank ballots		11,423	1.30
Total		880,992	100
Eligible voters/turnout		1,237,020	71.22

=== 2003 ===
Candidate	Party	Description	1st round		2nd round	
Candidate	Party	Description	Votes	%	Votes	%
Dmitry Zelenin	Independent	Deputy Chairman of the state committee for physical culture and sports	291,533	42.49%	283,438	57.42%
Igor Zubov	Independent	Former deputy minister of internal affairs	100,119	14.59%	167,074	33.85%
Tatyana Astrakhankina	Communist Party	Member of the State Duma	88,160	12.85%		
Vladimir Platov	Independent	Incumbent governor	85,455	12.45%		
Aleksandr Kharchenko	Independent	Mayor of Rzhev	33,894	4.94%		
Yury Krasnov	Independent	Former vice governor	26,808	3.91%		
Yury Tseberganov	Independent	Chief federal inspector for Tver Oblast	11,566	1.69%		
Aleksandr Ipatov	Independent	Deputy governor	5,293	0.77%		
Konstantin Fokin	Independent		4,953	0.72%		
Aleksandr Anzhinovsky	Independent		3,477	0.51%		
Viktor Isakov	Independent		911	0.13%		
Against all			34,028	4.96%	43,124	8.74%

=== 2007 ===
Candidate	Party	Description	For	Against	Abstained	Did not vote
Dmitry Zelenin	United Russia	Incumbent governor	28 / 33	1 / 33	1 / 33	3 / 33

=== 2011 ===
Candidate	Party	Description	For	Against
Andrey Shevelyov	United Russia	Acting governor, former deputy governor of Ryazan Oblast	30 / 40	10 / 40

=== 2016 ===
Candidate	Party	Description	Votes	%	Map
Igor Rudenya	United Russia	Acting governor	322,997	72.1%	
Anton Morozov	Liberal Democratic Party	Member of the State Duma	66,042	14.74%	
Ilya Kleymenov	Communists of Russia	Member of Konakovsky District Assembly of Deputies	43,509	9.71%	
Valid ballots			432,548	100%	
