= Andrei Yepishin =

Russian politician

- Андрей Епишин
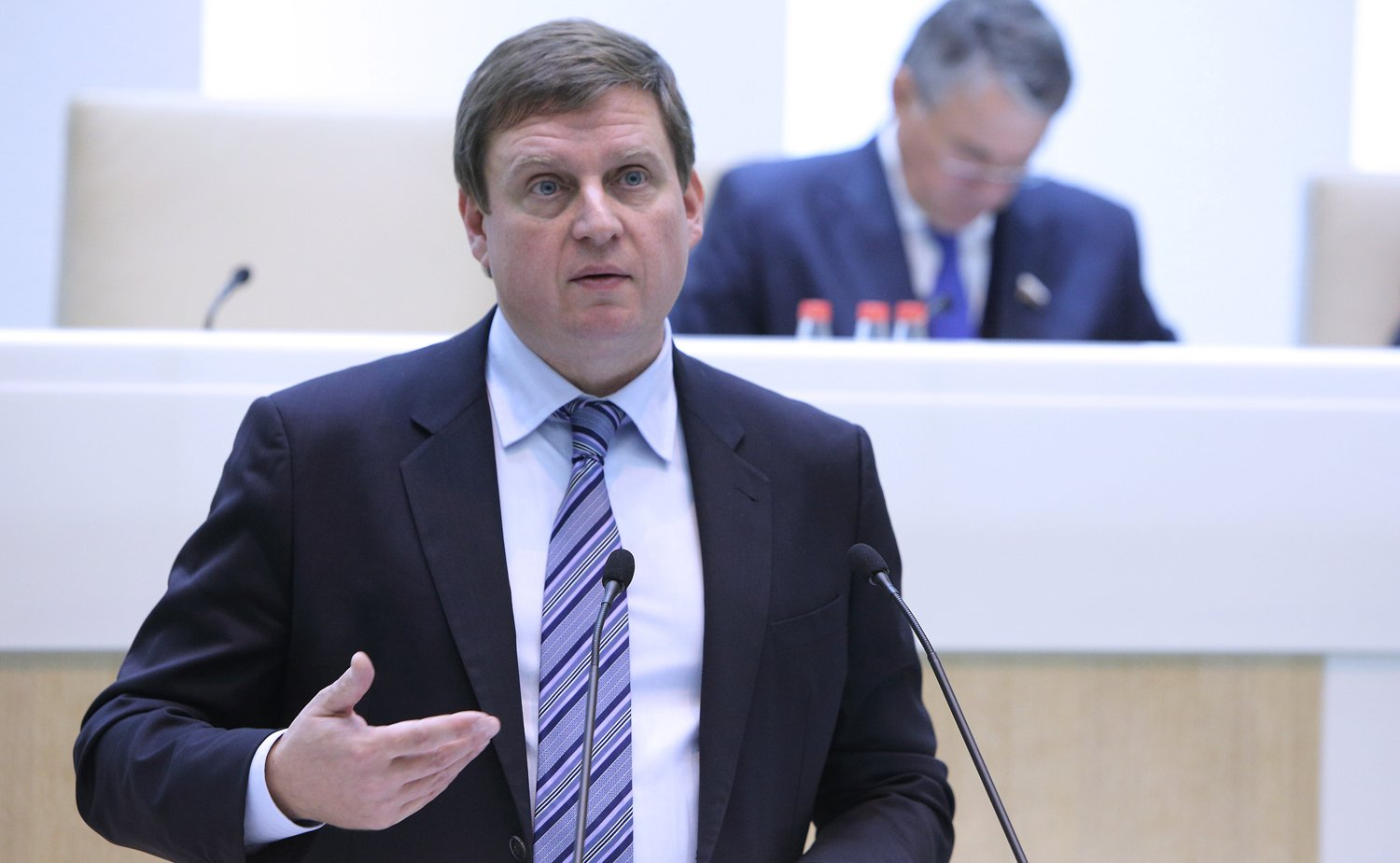

Senator from Tver Oblast
- Incumbent
- Assumed office 14 October 2021
- Preceded by: Vladimir Petrov

Chairman of the Legislative Assembly of Tver Oblast
- In office 29 December 2005 – 29 September 2016
- Preceded by: Mark Khasinov
- Succeeded by: Sergei Golubev

Personal details
- Born: Andrei Yepishin; 29 October 1967 (age 58) Moscow, Russian Soviet Socialist Republic, Soviet Union
- Party: United Russia
- Education: Moscow Institute of Physics and Technology

Andrei Nikolayevich Yepishin (Russian: Андрей Николаевич Епишин; born 29 October 1967) is a Russian politician serving as a senator from Tver Oblast since 14 October 2021.

== Biography ==
Andrei Yepishin was born on 29 October 1967 in Moscow. In 1990, he graduated from the Moscow Institute of Physics and Technology. During his studies, Yepishin headed the Komsomol organization and was the commander of the headquarters of student construction teams in the Moscow Oblast. In the final year of the university, he started working at the Baranov Central Institute of Aviation Motor Development. From 1991 to 1996, he was the deputy director and, later, director of the Moscow branch of Tveruniversalbank. He left the position to become deputy director for Economic Affairs of the Institute for the Problems of the Nuclear Safety Institute of the Russia Academy of Sciences. From 2000 to 2005, Yepishin was the deputy of the Moscow Oblast Duma of the 2nd and 3rd convocations. In 2003, he became one of the co-founders of the Moscow Regional Fund for Assistance to the Armed Forces. From 2005 to 2016, he was the deputy of the Legislative Assembly of Tver Oblast of the 4th, 5th, and 6th convocations. On 3 October 2016, he became the senator from the Legislative Assembly of Tver Oblast. In 2021, Yepishin was re-elected for the same position.

=== Sanctions ===
Andrei Yepishin is under personal sanctions introduced by the European Union, the United Kingdom, the USA, Canada, Switzerland, Australia, Ukraine, New Zealand, for ratifying the decisions of the "Treaty of Friendship, Cooperation and Mutual Assistance between the Russian Federation and the Donetsk People's Republic and between the Russian Federation and the Luhansk People's Republic" and providing political and economic support for Russia's annexation of Ukrainian territories.
