= Vladimir Vasilyev (politician) =

Russian politician

- Владимир Васильев
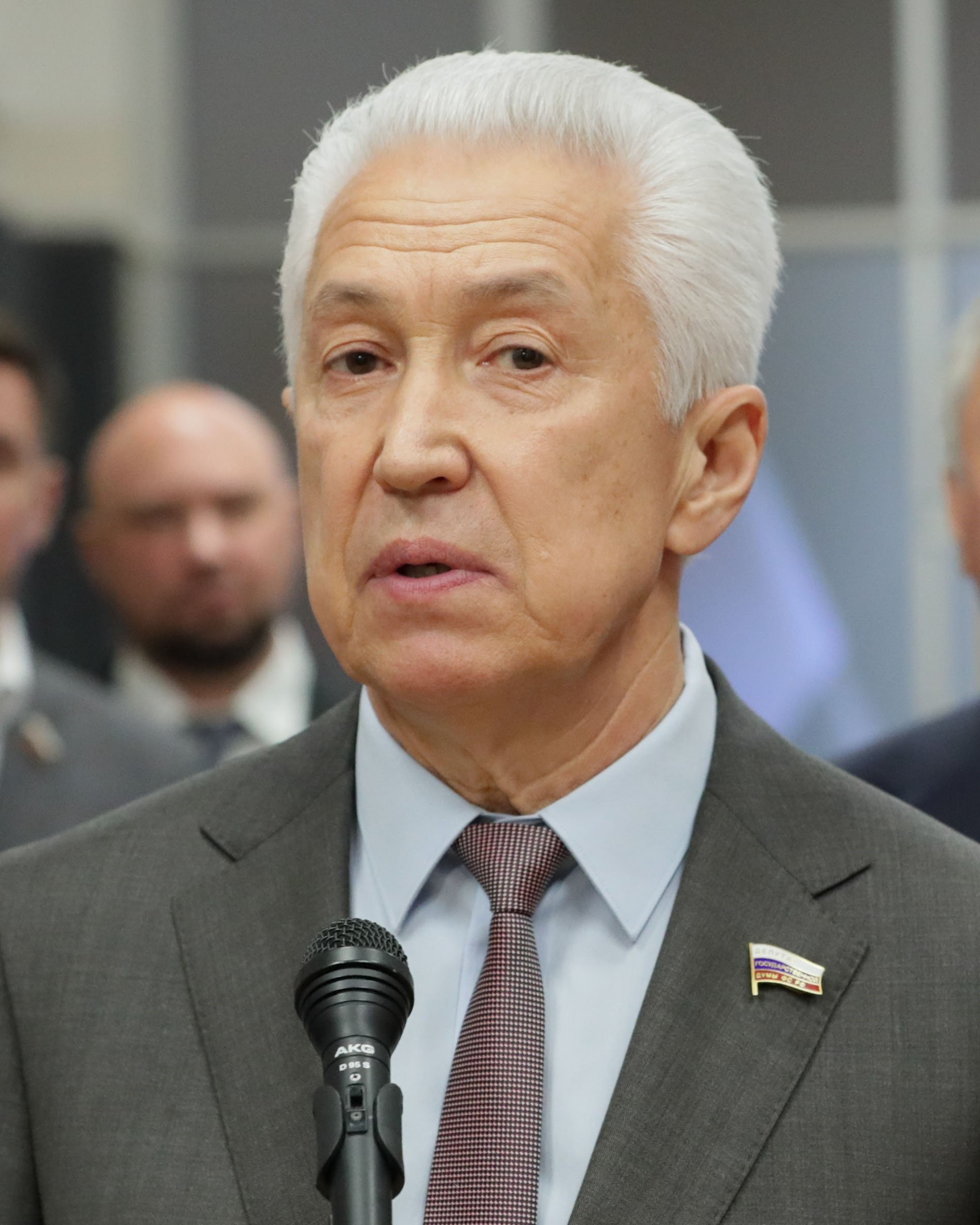
- Vasilyev in 2022

Parliamentary leader of United Russia in the State Duma
- In office 12 October 2021 – 30 September 2026
- Preceded by: Sergey Neverov
- Succeeded by: Dmitry Kobylkin
- In office 10 November 2012 – 3 October 2017
- Preceded by: Andrey Vorobyov
- Succeeded by: Sergey Neverov

Member of the State Duma for Tver Oblast
- Incumbent
- Assumed office 12 October 2021
- Preceded by: Sergey Veremeenko
- In office 5 October 2016 – 3 October 2017
- Preceded by: constituency established
- Succeeded by: Sergey Veremeenko
- Constituency: Zavolzhsky (No. 180)
- In office 29 December 2003 – 24 December 2007
- Preceded by: Tatyana Astrakhankina
- Succeeded by: constituencies abolished
- Constituency: Tver (No. 173)

5th Head of the Republic of Dagestan
- In office 3 October 2017 – 5 October 2020
- President: Vladimir Putin
- Preceded by: Ramazan Abdulatipov
- Succeeded by: Sergey Melikov

Member of the State Duma (Party List Seat)
- In office 24 December 2007 – 5 October 2016

Personal details
- Born: Vladimir Abdualievich Vasilyev; 11 August 1949 (age 77) Klin, Russian SFSR, Soviet Union
- Party: United Russia
- Education: Moscow State Law University; MVD Academy of Management
- Website: vavasiliev.ru

Vladimir Abdualievich Vasilyev (Russian: Влади́мир Абдуали́евич Васи́льев; born August 11, 1949) is a Russian politician who currently serves as parliamentary leader of United Russia in the State Duma. He served as Head of the Republic of Dagestan from 2017 to 2020.

== Biography ==
Vasilyev is of half-Russian, half-Kazakh descent. He was a deputy of the State Duma of the IV, V, VI and VII convocation, and a deputy speaker of the State Duma of the VI and VII convocation, the head of the United Russia faction, chairman of the Duma committee on security (2004-2011), and Deputy Secretary of the Security Council (1999-2001). Colonel-General of police, the candidate of legal sciences. He was awarded the Order For Merit to the Fatherland 3rd and 4th classes, Order of Courage, Order of Honour.

Vasilyev became the acting Head of the Republic of Dagestan after the resignation of Ramazan Abdulatipov on 3 October 2017. On 9 September 2018, Vasilyev was confirmed to be the official Head of the Republic of Dagestan. On 5 October 2020, Vasilyev resigned his post as Head of the Republic of Dagestan for health reasons.

On 19 September 2021, Vasilyev was again elected to the State Duma. On 7 October 2021, he was again elected parliamentary leader of United Russia.

== Activities as Head of Dagestan ==
In January 2018, an anti-corruption campaign was launched in Dagestan. The mayor of Makhachkala, Musa Musaev, was the first to be arrested, followed by senior officials of the republic’s government: acting Prime Minister Abdusamad Gamidov, Deputy Prime Ministers Shamil Isaev and Rayudin Yusufov, Makhachkala’s chief architect Magomedrasul Gitinov, former Minister of Health Tanka Ibragimov, former Minister of Education Shakhabas Shakhov, director of the Republican Compulsory Health Insurance Fund Magomed Suleymanov, and Rajab Abdulatipov, brother of the former head of the republic.

They were charged with land fraud, bribery, and participation in organized crime.

Other officials arrested included former head of Kazbekovsky District Abdula Makachev, former head of the administration of the village of Karabudakhkent Imav Zayniyov, former head of Karabudakhkent District Abiley Ilyasov, head of the Department of Education of the city of Dagestanskie Ogni Maksim Alikhanov, director of the Republic of Dagestan’s “Infrastructure Facilities Management Company” Gusen Zulpikarov, and former chief physician of Makhachkala’s Clinical Hospital No. 1 Medzhid Aliyev.

In July 2018, under the initiative of Vladimir Vasilyev and with the support of the autonomous non-profit organization Russia — Land of Opportunity, a recruitment competition called “My Dagestan” was launched. The program aimed to strengthen the region’s talent pool by attracting skilled and ambitious professionals.

By 2019, Dagestan remained among the Russian regions with relatively low wage levels. Around one-third of residents earned less than 15,000 rubles per month, while the median salary was 19,100 rubles. Most employees received between 11,000 and 28,000 rubles monthly.

== Sanctions ==
Due to his role in the Russian invasion of Ukraine, Vasilyev was among many Russian politicians sanctioned in February 2022 by the Ukrainian government, European Union, Australia and the G7 via the United States Department of State, the Canadian government, HM Home Office and Japan.

== Awards ==
- Order "For Merit to the Fatherland"
- Order of Alexander Nevsky
- Order of Courage
- Order of Honour
- Medal "For Distinction in the Protection of Public Order"
- Stolypin Medal
- Medal "For Military Cooperation" (Russian Ministry of Internal Affairs)
- Medal "200 Years of the Ministry of Internal Affairs of Russia"
- Medal "200th Anniversary of the Ministry of Defense"
- Medal "For Impeccable Service"
- Medal "For the Return of Crimea"
- Honoured Lawyer of Russia
- Honorary weapon
- Russian Federation Presidential Certificate of Honour
- Order of Holy Prince Daniel of Moscow

Preceded by Andrey Vorobyov	Parliamentary leader of United Russia in the State Duma; 2012–2017	Succeeded by Sergey Neverov
Preceded by Ramazan Abdulatipov	Head of the Republic of Dagestan; Acting; (2017–18); 2018–2020	Succeeded by Sergey Melikov
