= Sukhoverkovo =

Sukhoverkovo Суховерково
- Work settlement
- Interactive map of Sukhoverkovo
- Location of Sukhoverkovo Sukhoverkovo (Tver Oblast)
- Coordinates: 56°37′38″N 35°33′59″E
- Country: Russia
- Federal subject: Tver Oblast
- Administrative district: Kalininsky District

Population (2010 Census)
  - Total: 670
  - Estimate (2021): 562 (−16.1%)

Municipal status
  - Municipal district: Kalininsky Municipal District
  - Urban settlement: Urban Settlement Sukhoverkovo
  - Capital of: Urban Settlement Sukhoverkovo
- Time zone: UTC+3 (MSK)
- Postal code: 170553
- OKTMO ID: 28620163051

Sukhoverkovo (Russian: Сухове́рково) is an urban locality (an urban-type settlement) in Kalininsky District of Tver Oblast, Russia, located approximately 40 kilometres (25 mi) southwest of the city of Tver. Population: 670 (2010 census); 729 (2002 census); 973 (1989 Soviet census).

== History ==
Sukhoverkovo was founded as a settlement serving a peat extraction plant. The name originates from the village of Sukhoverkovo, which was first mentioned in the end of the 19th century and was located in the area. In the 2000s, more than the half of the population of the settlement were retirees.

== Economy ==
=== Industry ===
The peat extraction plant went bankrupt in the 1990s. The only two industrial enterprises in Sukhoverkovo are a factory producing fish products and a curb production factory.

=== Transportation ===
Sukhoverkovo has access to roads which connect Tver with Rzhev and with Lotoshino. There is infrequent bus traffic connecting Sukhoverkovo and Tver.
