= Marina Podtikhova =

Russian politician (born 1971)

- Марина Подтихова
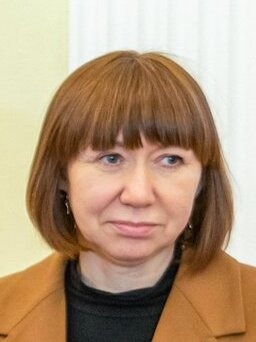
- Podtikhova in 2024

Governor of Tver Oblast
- In office 29 September 2025 – 5 November 2025
- Preceded by: Igor Rudenya
- Succeeded by: Vitaly Korolyov

Deputy Chairman of the Government of Tver Oblast
- Incumbent
- Assumed office October 2020
- Governor: Igor Rudenya; Vitaly Korolyov

Minister of Finance of Tver Oblast
- Incumbent
- Assumed office January 2019
- Preceded by: Irina Severina

Personal details
- Born: Marina Ivanovna Podtikhova; 1 August 1971 (age 54) Kalinin, Russian SFSR, Soviet Union

Marina Ivanovna Podtikhova (Russian: Марина Ивановна Подтихова; born 1 August 1971), is a Russian politician who was the acting Governor of Tver Oblast between 29 September and 5 November 2025.

She had been the Deputy Chairman of the Government of the Tver Oblast from 2020 to 2025, and had been the Minister of Finance of the Tver Oblast since 2019.

== Biography ==
Marina Podtikhova was born on 1 August 1971 in Kalinin.

From 1988 to 1990, she worked as an archivist at the State Archive of the Kalinin Region, and as a laboratory assistant at the English Language Department of Kalinin State University. From 1990 to 1991, she was a dispatcher at the Kaliningrazhdanstroy automobile enterprise.

From 1991 to 1994, she held the position of senior merchandiser at Tver Carriage Works OJSC, and for the next two years she worked as a leading auditor-inspector of the Financial Department of the Tver City Administration. In 1994, she graduated from the Faculty of Economics of Tver State University.

In 1996, she became the chief accountant of the Central District branch of the Financial Department of the Tver City Administration.

In 2002, she served as deputy head of the treasury execution department of the regional budget, from 2003 to 2005, she was the deputy head of the treasury department of the Department of Finance of the Tver Region, and from 2005 to 2008, she was the head of the treasury department of the Department of Finance of the Tver Region.

In 2008, she was appointed as the Deputy Head of the Department of Finance of the Tver Region. From 2011 to 2018, she headed the Federal Treasury Department for the Tver Region. From October 2018 to January 2019, she temporarily served as Minister of Finance of the Tver Region.

In January 2019, she became the Minister of Finance of the Tver Region. In October 2020, she was the Deputy Chairman of the Government of the Tver Region.

On 29 September 2025, Podtikhova became the acting Governor of Tver Oblast, after her predecessor, Igor Rudenya, took the position as the Presidential Envoy to the Northwestern Federal District. On 5 November 2025 she was replaced by Vitaly Korolyov as acting governor.

== Income and assets ==
She is the state Councilor of the Russian Federation, 2nd class.

According to official data, Podtikhova earned 2,966,126 rubles in 2020. Her husband - 98,093.60 rubles. She owns two apartments with a total area of 126.2 m².
