= Vladimir Lukin =

Russian politician (born 1937)

- Владимир Лукин
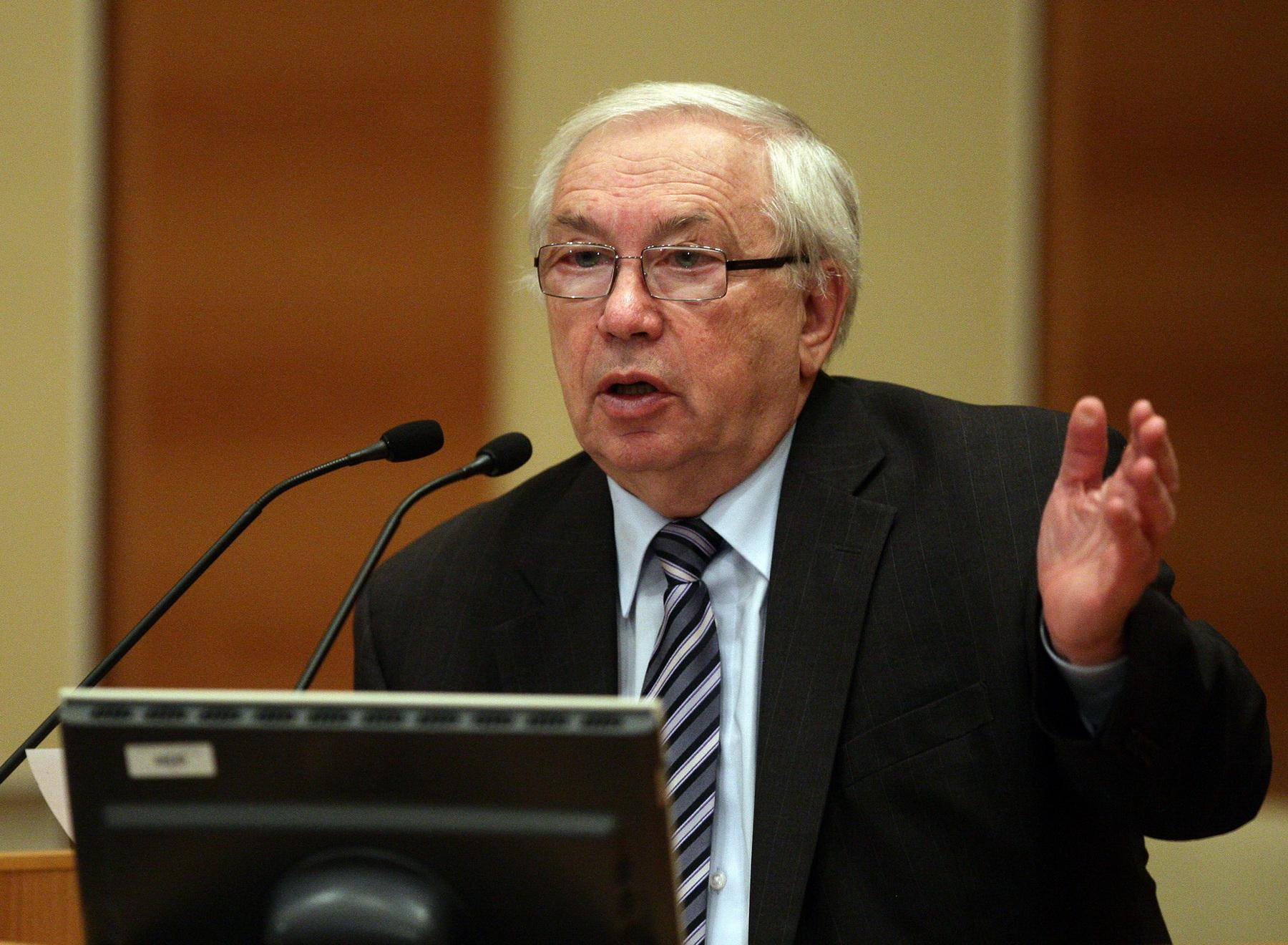
- Lukin in 2013

Russian Federation Senator from Tver Oblast
- In office 23 September 2016 – 26 September 2021
- Preceded by: Viktor Abramov
- Succeeded by: Lyudmila Skakovskaya

3rd Commissioner for Human Rights
- In office 13 February 2004 – 18 March 2014
- President: Vladimir Putin; Dmitry Medvedev; Vladimir Putin
- Preceded by: Oleg Mironov
- Succeeded by: Ella Pamfilova

Ambassador of Russia to the United States
- In office 24 January 1992 – 8 February 1994
- President: Boris Yeltsin
- Preceded by: Viktor Komplektov
- Succeeded by: Yuli Vorontsov

Personal details
- Born: 13 July 1937 (age 89) Omsk, Russian SFSR, USSR
- Party: Yabloko (co-founder; 1993–2004, 2016–2020)
- Other political affiliations: CPSU (1960–1991)
- Education: Moscow State Pedagogical University

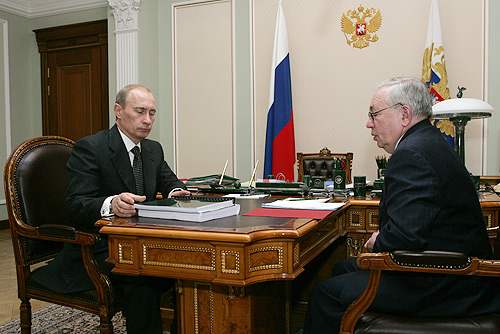
Lukin with Vladimir Putin on 13 February 2008.

Vladimir Petrovich Lukin (sometimes erroneously Lokin; Russian: Владимир Петрович Лукин; born 13 July 1937) is a Russian politician who served as Human Rights Commissioner of Russia from February 2004 to March 2014. He was the President of the Russian Paralympic Committee from 1997 to 2021. He was the Russian Ambassador to the United States from 1992 to 1994.

== Political activity ==
In 1990s, Lukin was one of the founders of the liberal-democratic Yabloko Party (the letter L in "Yabloko" came from his name). He previously served as the deputy chairman of the Russian Duma, chair of the Duma's Foreign Affairs Committee and as Ombudsman. He is a director on the board of the Nuclear Threat Initiative (NTI), and is also a former Ambassador to the United States. He is considered a long-time specialist in U.S.-Soviet/Russian strategic arms control issues and is a member of Russia's Council on Foreign and Defense Policy, an independent association of national security experts.

On 18 February 2009, at President Medvedev's recommendation, the Russian Duma voted him another five-year term as human rights commissioner. This term expired in March 2014, and Lukin was replaced by Ella Pamfilova.

== Awards ==
In 2014, Lukin was awarded the Paralympic Order.

Diplomatic posts
Preceded by Viktor Komplektov	Russian Ambassador to the United States; 24 January 1992 – 8 February 1994	Succeeded by Yuli Vorontsov
