= Tatyana Astrakhankina =

Russian politician

- Татьяна Астраханкина
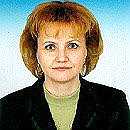

Member of the State Duma for Tver Oblast
- In office 11 January 1994 – 29 December 2003
- Preceded by: Constituency created
- Succeeded by: Vladimir Vasilyev
- Constituency: Tver (No. 172) (Note: renumbered to 173 in 1995)

Personal details
- Born: 20 December 1960 (age 65) Rzhev, Kalinin Oblast, Russian SFSR, Soviet Union
- Party: CPRF (1993-2004); Patriots of Russia (2006)
- Other party: CPSU (1983–91); RCWP (1992–93)
- Children: 1 son
- Education: Rzhev Agricultural College; Moscow State University
- Occupation: journalist

Tatyana Alexandrovna Astrakhankina (Russian: Татьяна Александровна Астраханкина, born 20 December 1960) is a Russian journalist and politician.

== Biography ==
From 1978 to 1983 she worked as a correspondent, and in 1983–93 as head of the agricultural department of the Rzhevskaya Pravda newspaper. In 1983 she joined the CPSU. In 1985 she graduated from the Rzhev Agricultural College and was elected to the Rzhev city council. In 1991 she graduated in absentia from the MSU Faculty of Journalism. From 1991 to 1993 she was a member of the Russian Communist Workers Party, in 1993 she joined the Communist Party of the Russian Federation. Since that year, she has been a member of the editorial board of the CPRF's newspaper Pravda Rossii.

In 1993, Astrakhankina elected to the 1st State Duma from the Tver constituency No. 172. She was a member of the committee on agrarian issues and the Communist Party faction. Re-elected in 1995 and 1999. From 1994 Astrakhankina also was the first secretary of the CPRF local committee in Rzhev. Secretary of the CPRF Central Committee. In July 2002, she initiated an appeal by members of the Duma about the "vital danger to the Earth" posed by US experiments in near-Earth space.

Astrakhankina was Communist candidate in the 2003 gubernatorial election in Tver Oblast, finishing third with 13% of the vote. In the federal election, she ran unsuccessfully in the Tver constituency and on the CPRF list, but did not get into the new parliament. Astrakhankina blamed CPRF leadership of her lose and also expressed interest to run for president in 2004.

In 2004, Astrakhankina became one of the organizers of the alternative plenary session of the CPRF Central Committee, led by Gennady Semigin, which voted to remove party leader Gennady Zyuganov from his office. However, the election authority and Justice ministry recognised session as illegitimate, and Astrakhankina soon was expelled from the party, joining the short-lived "All-Russian Communist Party of the Future" founded by Vladimir Tikhonov, who was named new CPRF leader at the anti-Zyuganov session.

In 2006, Astrakhankina unsuccessfully ran in the Karelian legislative election on the Patriots of Russia list. In the late 2000s, she worked in the office of the Civic Chamber of Russia. In 2010–11 she was an adviser to the mayor of Rzhev on public relations.

== Legislative Activity ==
From 1993 to 2003, during her tenure as a deputy of the State Duma of the I, II, and III convocations, she co-authored 36 legislative initiatives and amendments to draft federal laws.
