= Lyudmila Skakovskaya =

Russian politician (born 1961)

- Людмила Скаковская
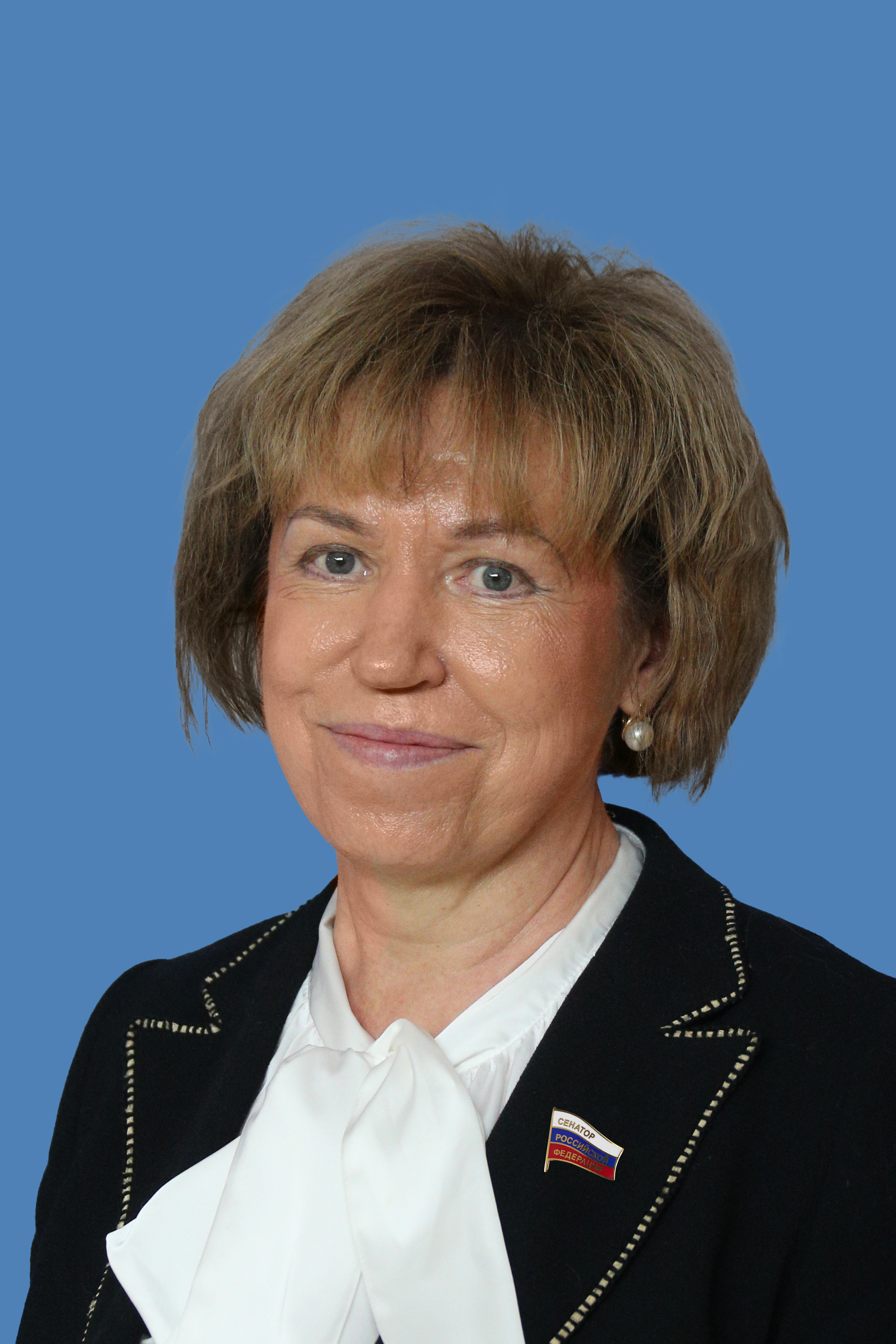

Senator from Tver Oblast
- In office 24 September 2021 – 24 September 2026
- Preceded by: Vladimir Lukin
- Succeeded by: Alexey Meshkov

Personal details
- Born: Lyudmila Skakovskaya; 13 November 1961 (age 64) Bezhetsk, Tver Oblast, Russian Soviet Federative Socialist Republic, Soviet Union
- Party: United Russia
- Education: Tver State University

Lyudmila Nikolayevna Skakovskaya (Russian: Людмила Николаевна Скаковская; born 13 November 1961) is a Russian politician serving as a senator from Tver Oblast since 24 September 2021.

== Career ==
Lyudmila Skakovskaya was born on 13 November 1961 in Bezhetsk, Tver Oblast. In 1984, she graduated from the Tver State University. After graduation, she worked as a Russian-language teacher at the Bezhetsk school. In 2002, she was appointed dean of the philology department of the Tver State University. From 2009 to 2017, Skakovskaya served as the first rector for teaching and educational work of Tver State University. On 12 November 2020, she was appointed the rector of the university. On 24 September 2021, she became the senator from Tver Oblast.

== Sanctions ==
Lyudmila Skakovskaya is under personal sanctions introduced by the European Union, the United Kingdom, the United States, Canada, Switzerland, Australia, Ukraine, New Zealand, for ratifying the decisions of the "Treaty of Friendship, Cooperation and Mutual Assistance between the Russian Federation and the Donetsk People's Republic and between the Russian Federation and the Luhansk People's Republic" and providing political and economic support for Russia's annexation of Ukrainian territories.
