= Andrey Shevelyov =

Russian politician (born 1970)

- Андрей Шевелёв
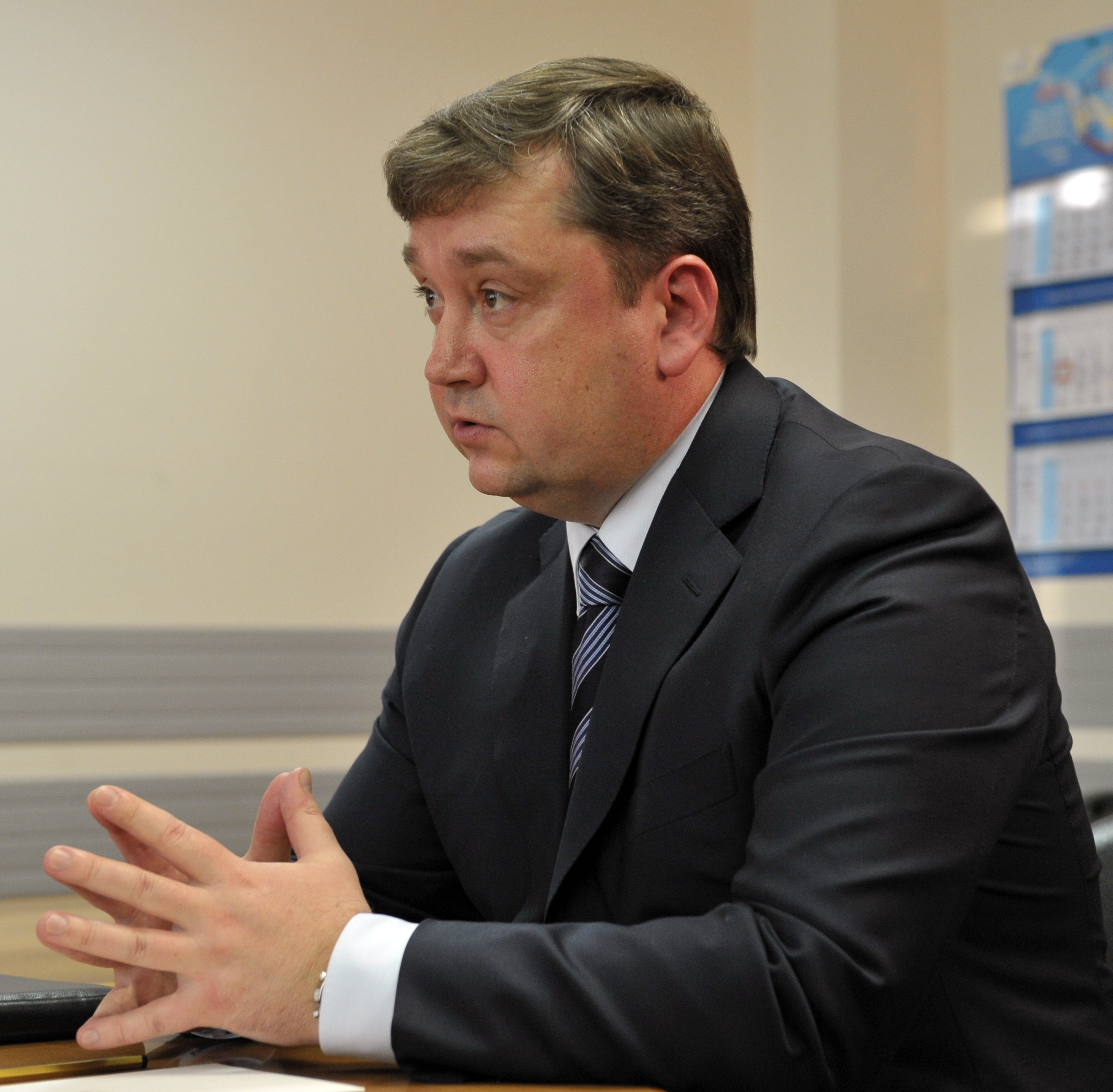
- Shevelyov in 2011

4th Governor of Tver Oblast
- In office 7 July 2011 – 2 March 2016
- Preceded by: Dmitry Zelenin
- Succeeded by: Igor Rudenya

Member of the State Duma for North West Saint Petersburg
- In office 2003–2007

Personal details
- Born: 24 May 1970 (age 55) Leningrad, Soviet Union

Military service
- Allegiance: Soviet Union; Russia
- Branch/service: Airborne Forces
- Years of service: 1987–2003
- Rank: Colonel

Andrey Vladimirovich Shevelyov (Russian: Андрей Владимирович Шевелёв; born 24 May 1970) is a Russian politician and former military officer. He served as governor of Tver Oblast from 2011 to 2016.

== Biography ==
Andrey Shevelyov was born in 1970 in Leningrad. Then he moved with his parents to the town of Bely, Kalinin Oblast. He educated at the Kalinin Suvorov Military School and Ryazan Higher Airborne Command School. After graduating from Ryazan School in 1991, he began his military service in the 76th Airborne Division. Shevelyov participated in the Georgian–Ossetian conflict and Ossetian-Ingush conflict.

In December 1994, Shevelyov was wounded while combating Chechen separatists in Oktyabrskoye near Grozny. In January 1995 senior lieutenant Andrey Shevelyov was awarded the title of Hero of the Russian Federation, becoming one of the first recipients of that title for service in the Chechen campaign. From 1997 he taught at Saint Petersburg Suvorov Military School.

From 2003 to 2007, Shevelyov represented the North West constituency of Saint Petersburg in the 4th State Duma. Member of the Credit Organizations and Markets Committee and United Russia faction. In May 2008 Ryazan Oblast governor Oleg Kovalyov appointed Shevelyov his first deputy.

In July 2011 Shevelyov was appointed Governor of Tver Oblast by president Dmitry Medvedev. As well as his predecessor Dmitry Zelenin, Shevelyov enjoyed low public approval. He resigned in March 2016, succeeded by Igor Rudenya.

Shevelyov is married and has three children.

== See also ==
- List of Heroes of the Russian Federation
