= Igor Rudenya =

Russian politician and statesman (born 1968)

- Игорь Руденя
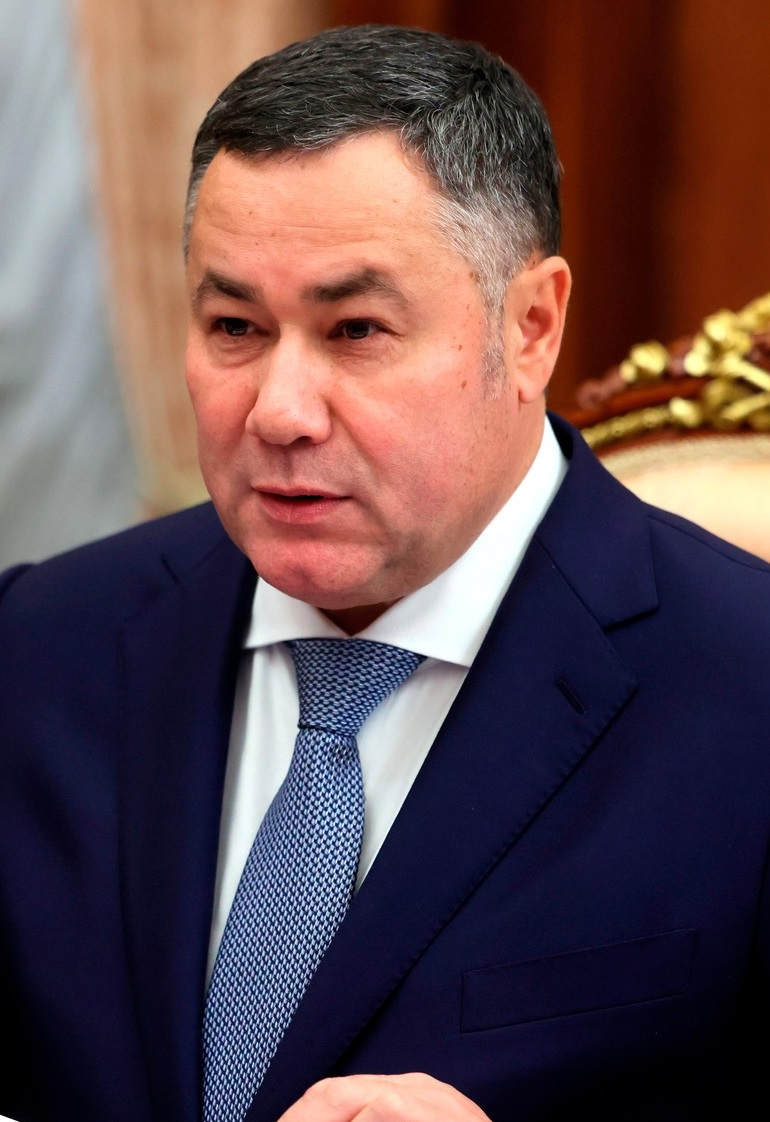
- Rudenya in 2025

9th Presidential Envoy to the Northwestern Federal District
- Incumbent
- Assumed office 29 September 2025
- President: Vladimir Putin
- Preceded by: Aleksandr Gutsan

5th Governor of Tver Oblast
- In office 23 September 2016 – 29 September 2025; Acting: 2 March – 23 September 2016
- Preceded by: Andrey Shevelyov
- Succeeded by: Marina Podtikhova (acting); Vitaly Korolyov (acting)

Personal details
- Born: 15 February 1968 (age 58) Moscow, Soviet Union
- Party: United Russia
- Education: Moscow State University of Food Production

Igor Mikhaylovich Rudenya (Russian: Игорь Михайлович Руденя; born 15 February 1968) is a Russian politician who currently serves as the Plenipotentiary Presidential Envoy to the Northwestern Federal District since September 29, 2025. He previously served as the 5th governor of Tver Oblast from September 2016 to September 2025. He has the federal state civilian service rank of 1st class Active State Councillor of the Russian Federation.

He was the State Secretary - Deputy Minister of Agriculture of the Russia from 2005 to 2007, and the Director of the Department of Agro-Industrial Complex of the Government of the Russian Federation from 2008 to 2012. He is the Honored Worker of Agriculture of the Russian Federation in 2012. Rudneya is a member of the General Council of the United Russia party

== Biography ==
Igor Rudenya was born in Moscow on 15 February 1968.

From 1986 to 1988, he served in the Soviet Army.

After demobilization, he worked in the internal affairs bodies.

From 1989 to 1991, he served in the Main Directorate of the Ministry of Internal Affairs for Moscow.

Between 1992 and 1996, he worked in executive positions at OJSC Federal Contract Corporation Roskhleboprodukt.

In September 1995, he became one of the founders and managers of the Pokrov Fund for Assistance to Employees, Veterans and Families of Perished State Security Officers.

In 1996, he became the general director of CJSC Roszerno.

In 1998, he studied at the Moscow State University of Food Production, with a specialty - economist-manager.

In 2002, he finished the Military Academy of the General Staff of the Armed Forces of the Russia, in advanced training.

In 2002, he began work in the Office of the Government of the Russia, heading the department for the Development of the Agro-Industrial Complex of the Office of the Government of Russia.

In 2004, he was appointed deputy director of the Department for Sectoral Development of the Government of Russia.

From 2005 to 2007, Runenya was the Secretary of State - Deputy Minister of Agriculture of Russia. Together with officials from the Ministry of Economic Development and the Ministry of Finance of Russia, he took part in the implementation of the EGAIS system for accounting for the turnover of alcoholic beverages. Due to the imperfection of the legislative acts regulating the functioning of the system, as well as problems with the regulatory documentation, which had to be prepared by the Ministry of Economic Development and Trade, the Ministry of Internal Affairs, Rosstat, the Federal Security Service, the Federal Tax Service, the Ministry of Health and Social Development, the Federal Customs Service and the Ministry of Industry and Energy, the implementation of the system was negatively accepted in the Russian alcoholic beverages market.

On 15 November 2007, by the order of the Government of Rudenya, he was appointed director of the newly created Department of Regional Development and Agroindustrial Complex, transformed from the Department of Regional Monitoring of the Government.

On 22 August 2008, Prime Minister Vladimir Putin appointed Rudenya as the Director of the Department of Agro-Industrial Complex of the Government of Russia. In February 2009, when it became known about the upcoming resignation of Alexey Gordeyev from the post of Minister of Agriculture, Rudenya was named one of the possible candidates for the post, but in the end, Yelena Skrynnik was appointed head of the Ministry of Agriculture.

In October 2009, Rudenya entered the list of candidates for the post of governor of the Volgograd Oblast proposed by Dmitry Medvedev.

He became the General Director of CJSC Roszerno again from 2012 to 2016.

=== Governor of Tver Oblast ===
On 2 March 2016, after the resignation of the Governor of the Tver Oblast, Andrey Shevelyov, and by the decree of the President Putin, Rudenya was appointed acting head of the oblast.

On 23 June 2016, Rudenya submitted documents to the Election Commission of the Tver Oblast for his nomination as a candidate for the post of regional governor. He won the elections on 18 September 2016, gaining 72.13% of the vote.

On 23 September 2016, in the building of the Tver Regional Academic Drama Theater, as part of the 73rd extraordinary meeting of the Legislative Assembly of the Tver Region, a solemn ceremony of Rudenya's inauguration took place.

From January 27 to December 21, 2020, he was the Member of the Presidium of the State Council of the Russia.

Rudenya is a member of the General Council of the United Russia party. He was the secretary of the Tver regional branch of the United Russia party.

=== Presidential envoy ===
In September 2025, President Putin appointed Rudenya as presidential envoy to the Northwestern Federal District.

== Sanctions ==
In December 2022 the EU sanctioned Igor Rudenya in relation to the 2022 Russian invasion of Ukraine.

== Family ==
Rudenya is married to Olga, and has five children: Georgy, Mikhail, Danil, Anna and Maria. His grandfather Mikhail Rudenya (1922-2002), a veteran of the World War II, at the front was a lieutenant of the medical service, as a paramedic.

== Personal life and hobbies ==
Rudenya has no accounts in any of the social networks. In interviews with the press, he tries to avoid personal questions, details of family and off-duty life. It is known that Rudenya is a believer, visits Orthodox churches and monasteries with his whole family, knows how to ring the bells correctly. According to him, he was baptized as a child, but truly imbued with faith when he served in the army.
