= Vitaly Korolyov =

Russian statesman

- Виталий Королёв
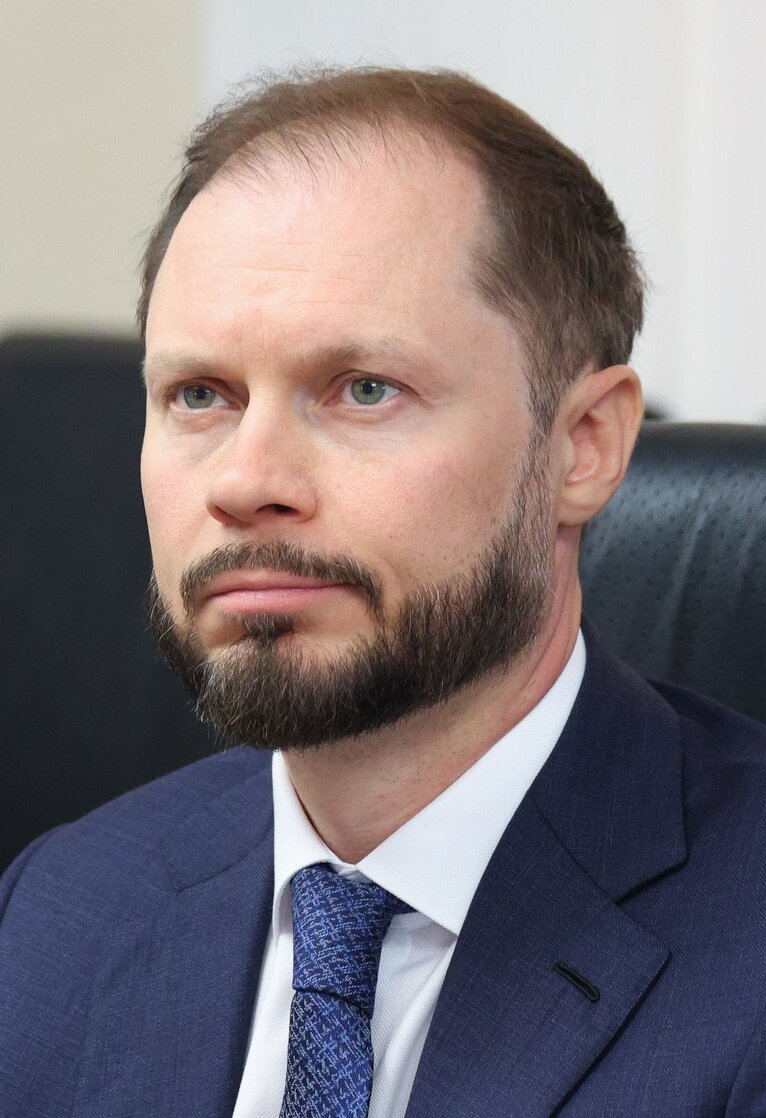
- Korolyov in 2025

Acting Governor of Tver Oblast
- Incumbent
- Assumed office 5 November 2025
- Preceded by: Igor Rudenya; Marina Podtikhova (acting)

Deputy Executive of the Federal Antimonopoly Service
- In office 20 October 2015 – 5 November 2025
- Prime Minister: Dmitry Medvedev; Mikhail Mishustin
- Service executive: Igor Artemyev; Maxim Shaskolsky

Personal details
- Born: 23 June 1980 (age 46) Krasnoyarsk, RSFSR, Soviet Union
- Education: Krasnoyarsk State Agrarian University; Krasnoyarsk State Pedagogical University; Moscow State Institute of International Relations
- Awards: Medal of the Order "For Merit to the Fatherland", 2nd class Letter of Gratitude from the President of Russia

Vitaly Gennadyevich Korolyov (Russian: Виталий Геннадьевич Королёв; born 23 June 1980) is a Russian economist and statesman serving as acting Governor of Tver Oblast since November 2025. He holds the rank of 2nd class State Councillor of the Russian Federation.

== Biography ==
Korolyov was born on June 23, 1980, in Krasnoyarsk, Soviet Union.

In 2002, he graduated from the Krasnoyarsk State Agrarian University with a law degree, and a year later from the Krasnoyarsk State Pedagogical University with a degree in English studies. In 2007 he completed a master's degree in economics at Moscow State Institute of International Relations. In 2014, he obtained a Candidate of Sciences (Ph.D. equal) degree in economics at the Institute of Economics of the Russian Academy of Sciences.

Korolyov is a graduate of the fourth cohort of the RANEPA "Governors' School," a program for developing the state managerial reserve.

Since 2005, Korolyov has served in the Federal Antimonopoly Service. From 2008 to 2015, he was the chief of the Service's directorate for electrical energy industry control. In 2015, he became the Service's deputy executive.

In 2024, he was appointed Head of the Antimonopoly Regulation Department of Moscow State Institute of International Relations.

On November 5, 2025, President Vladimir Putin appointed Korolyov acting Governor of Tver Oblast, following previous Governor Igor Rudenya's transfer to the position of Presidential Envoy to the Northwestern Federal District.
