= Orsha (urban-type settlement), Tver Oblast =

Orsha Орша
- Work settlement
- Interactive map of Orsha
- Location of Orsha Orsha (Tver Oblast)
- Coordinates: 56°54′45″N 36°13′52″E
- Country: Russia
- Federal subject: Tver Oblast
- Administrative district: Kalininsky District
- founded: 1955
- Urban-type settlement status since: 1974

Population (2010 Census)
  - Total: 2,252
  - Estimate (2021): 1,974 (−12.3%)

Municipal status
  - Municipal district: Kalininsky Municipal District
  - Urban settlement: Urban Settlement Orsha
  - Capital of: Urban Settlement Orsha
- Time zone: UTC+3 (MSK)
- Postal code: 170513
- OKTMO ID: 28620157051

Orsha (Russian: О́рша) is an urban locality (an urban-type settlement) in Kalininsky District of Tver Oblast, Russia, located northeast of the city of Tver, on the right bank of the Orsha River, and surrounded by swamps. Population: 2,252 (2010 census); 2,347 (2002 census); 2,696 (1989 Soviet census).

== History ==
Orsha was founded in 1955, when peat extraction started. Until 1994, the Orshinskoye-1 Peat Extraction Plant was the main employer in the settlement, but then it decayed and eventually was closed. It is currently defunct. In 1974, Orsha was granted urban-type settlement status.

== Economy ==
=== Industry ===
The industry of Orsha is based on peat and timber production.

=== Transportation ===
Orsha is connected by a road with Tver.
