= Legislative Assembly of Tver Oblast =

Regional parliament of Tver Oblast, Russia

Coordinates: 56°51′30″N 35°55′19″E

Legislative Assembly of Tver Oblast Законодательное собрание Тверской области
- 8th legislature

Type
- Type: Unicameral

Leadership
- Chairman: Sergei Golubev, United Russia since 29 September 2016

Structure
- Seats: 40
- Political groups: United Russia (31); CPRF (4); New People (3); LDPR (2)
- Length of term: 5 years

Elections
- Voting system: Mixed
- First election: 20 March 1994
- Last election: 20 September 2026
- Next election: by September 2031

Meeting place
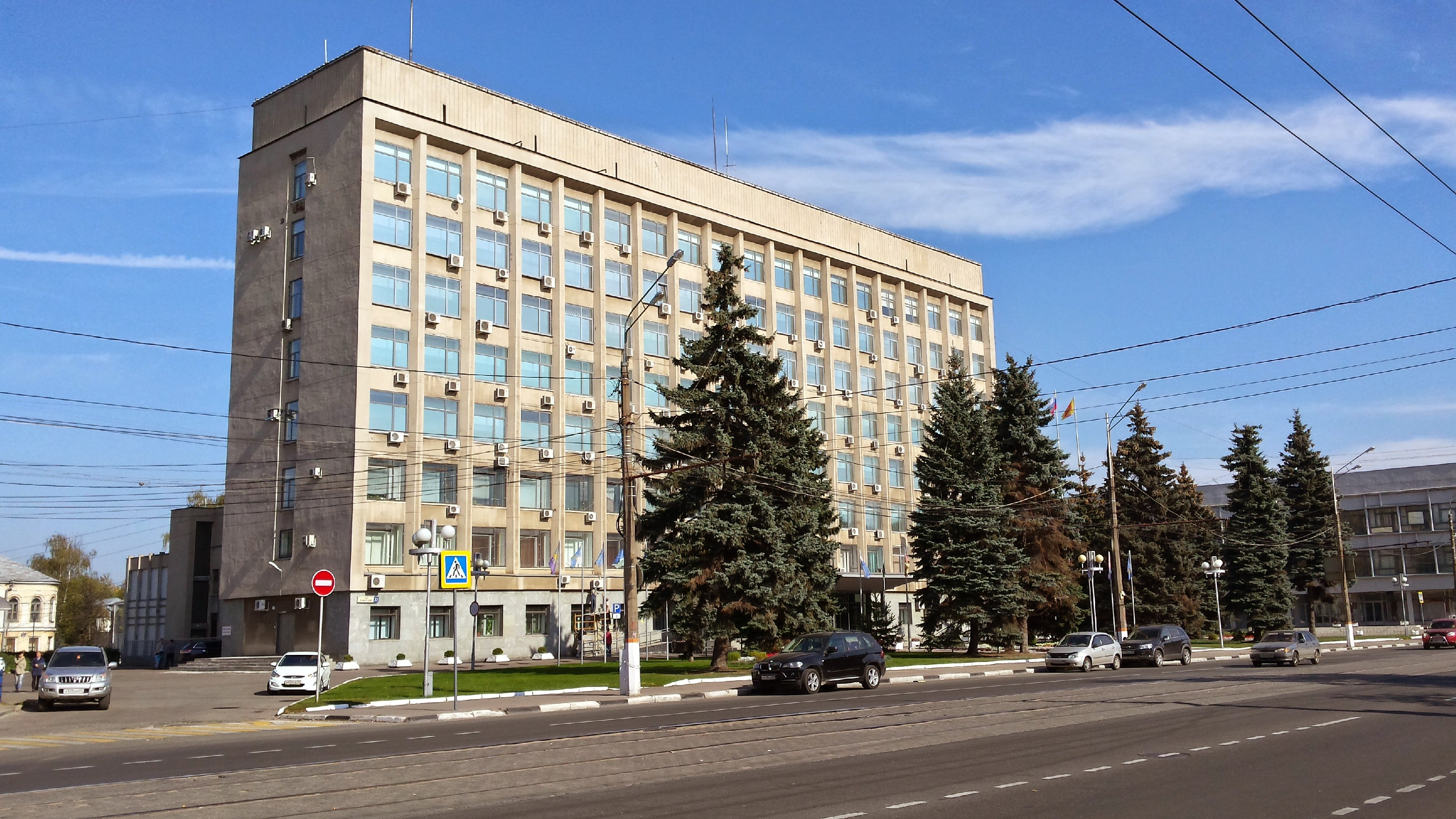
- 33 Sovetskaya Street, Tver

Website
- www.zsto.ru

The Legislative Assembly of Tver Oblast (Russian: Законодательное собрание Тверской области) is the regional parliament of Tver Oblast, a federal subject of Russia. A total of 40 deputies are elected for five-year terms.

== History ==
On 20 March 1994, the first Legislative Assembly, consisting of 32 deputies, was elected by direct popular vote. The first meeting was held on 31 March. The deputies adopted the Declaration, which proclaimed: "The Legislative Assembly exercises representative (legislative) power in Tver Oblast and is part of the system of state authorities."

On 14 December 1997, elections of the second Legislative Assembly took place in all 26 constituencies. 33 deputies were elected, of which seven were members of the first Assembly. On 29 November 1998, the Charter of Tver Oblast was adopted.

== Composition ==
Term	CPRF RPPSS SR APR NL Unity UR CHiR LDPR PNV "NV" Rodina Ind. Vacant	Total	Voting system
1994–1997	32 / 1	33	33 FPTP
1997–2001	32 / 1	33	19 FPTP + 14 MNTV
2001–2005	22 / 8 / 3	33	19 FPTP + 14 SNTV
2005–2011	5 / 1 / 5 / 15 / 2 / 2 / 3	33	16 FPTP + 17 open list
2011–2016	8 / 4 / 26 / 2	40	20 FPTP + 20 closed list
2016–2021	3 / 2 / 31 / 4	40	20 FPTP + 20 closed list
2021–2026	5 / 1 / 2 / 29 / 3	40	20 FPTP + 20 closed list
2026–present	4 / 3 / 31 / 2	40	20 FPTP + 20 closed list

== Chairmen ==
- Vladimir Kurbatov — 1st convocation — 1994–97
- Vyacheslav Mironov — 2nd convocation — 1997–2001
- Mark Khasainov — 3rd convocation — 2001–05
- Andrei Yepishin — 4th, 5th convocations — 2005–16
- Sergey Golubev — 6th, 7th, 8th convocations — 2016–present
