= Lesnoy, Russia =

Lesnoy (Russian: Лесно́й; masculine), Lesnaya (Лесна́я; feminine), or Lesnoye (Лесно́е; neuter) is the name of several inhabited localities in Russia.

== Republic of Adygea ==
As of 2010, two rural localities in the Republic of Adygea bear this name:

- Lesnoy, Giaginsky District, Republic of Adygea, a settlement in Giaginsky District
- Lesnoy, Krasnogvardeysky District, Republic of Adygea, a settlement in Krasnogvardeysky District

== Altai Krai ==
As of 2010, eight rural localities in Altai Krai bear this name:

- Lesnoy, Barnaul, Altai Krai, a settlement in Vlasikhinskaya Settlement Administration of the city of krai significance of Barnaul
- Lesnoy, Bobrovsky Selsoviet, Pervomaysky District, Altai Krai, a settlement in Bobrovsky Selsoviet of Pervomaysky District
- Lesnoy, Borovikhinsky Selsoviet, Pervomaysky District, Altai Krai, a settlement in Borovikhinsky Selsoviet of Pervomaysky District
- Lesnoy, Rebrikhinsky District, Altai Krai, a settlement in Panovsky Selsoviet of Rebrikhinsky District
- Lesnoy, Troitsky District, Altai Krai, a settlement in Belovsky Selsoviet of Troitsky District
- Lesnoye, Biysky District, Altai Krai, a selo in Lesnoy Selsoviet of Biysky District
- Lesnoye, Burlinsky District, Altai Krai, a selo in Rozhkovsky Selsoviet of Burlinsky District
- Lesnoye, Nemetsky natsionalny District, Altai Krai, a selo in Orlovsky Selsoviet of Nemetsky National District

== Amur Oblast ==
As of 2010, one rural locality in Amur Oblast bears this name:

- Lesnoy, Amur Oblast, a settlement under the administrative jurisdiction of Skovorodino Urban Settlement of Skovorodinsky District

== Astrakhan Oblast ==
As of 2010, one rural locality in Astrakhan Oblast bears this name:

- Lesnoye, Astrakhan Oblast, a selo in Olinsky Selsoviet of Limansky District

== Republic of Bashkortostan ==
As of 2010, two rural localities in the Republic of Bashkortostan bear this name:

- Lesnoy, Republic of Bashkortostan, a village in Milovsky Selsoviet of Ufimsky District
- Lesnoye, Republic of Bashkortostan, a village in Skvorchikhinsky Selsoviet of Ishimbaysky District

== Bryansk Oblast ==
As of 2010, two rural localities in Bryansk Oblast bear this name:

- Lesnoye, Bryansky District, Bryansk Oblast, a selo in Steklyannoraditsky Selsoviet of Bryansky District
- Lesnoye, Surazhsky District, Bryansk Oblast, a settlement in Kamensky Selsoviet of Surazhsky District

== Republic of Buryatia ==
As of 2010, one rural locality in the Republic of Buryatia bears this name:

- Lesnoy, Republic of Buryatia, a settlement in Zavodskoy Selsoviet of Tarbagataysky District

== Chelyabinsk Oblast ==
As of 2010, five rural localities in Chelyabinsk Oblast bear this name:

- Lesnoy, Kizilsky District, Chelyabinsk Oblast, a settlement in Put Oktyabrya Selsoviet of Kizilsky District
- Lesnoy, Krasnoarmeysky District, Chelyabinsk Oblast, a settlement in Kozyrevsky Selsoviet of Krasnoarmeysky District
- Lesnoy, Kunashaksky District, Chelyabinsk Oblast, a settlement in Kunashaksky Selsoviet of Kunashaksky District
- Lesnoy, Uysky District, Chelyabinsk Oblast, a settlement in Sokolovsky Selsoviet of Uysky District
- Lesnoy, Yetkulsky District, Chelyabinsk Oblast, a settlement in Belousovsky Selsoviet of Yetkulsky District

== Chuvash Republic ==
As of 2010, four rural localities in the Chuvash Republic bear this name:

- Lesnoy, Alatyrsky District, Chuvash Republic, a settlement in Altyshevskoye Rural Settlement of Alatyrsky District
- Lesnoy, Kanashsky District, Chuvash Republic, a vyselok in Khuchelskoye Rural Settlement of Kanashsky District
- Lesnoy, Yadrinsky District, Chuvash Republic, a settlement in Ivankovskoye Rural Settlement of Yadrinsky District
- Lesnaya, Chuvash Republic, a village in Shtanashskoye Rural Settlement of Krasnochetaysky District

== Irkutsk Oblast ==
As of 2010, two rural localities in Irkutsk Oblast bear this name:

- Lesnoy, Kachugsky District, Irkutsk Oblast, a settlement in Kachugsky District
- Lesnoy, Nizhneudinsky District, Irkutsk Oblast, a settlement in Nizhneudinsky District

== Ivanovo Oblast ==
As of 2010, one rural locality in Ivanovo Oblast bears this name:

- Lesnoye, Ivanovo Oblast, a village in Ivanovsky District

== Kabardino-Balkar Republic ==
As of 2010, two rural localities in the Kabardino-Balkar Republic bear this name:

- Lesnoye, Maysky District, Kabardino-Balkar Republic, a selo in Maysky District
- Lesnoye, Prokhladnensky District, Kabardino-Balkar Republic, a selo in Prokhladnensky District

== Kaliningrad Oblast ==
Modern rural localities

As of 2010, six rural localities in Kaliningrad Oblast bear this name:

- Lesnoy, Kaliningrad Oblast, a settlement in Kurshsky Rural Okrug of Zelenogradsky District
- Lesnoye, Chernyakhovsky District, Kaliningrad Oblast, a settlement in Svobodnensky Rural Okrug of Chernyakhovsky District
- Lesnoye, Guryevsky District, Kaliningrad Oblast, a settlement in Novomoskovsky Rural Okrug of Guryevsky District
- Lesnoye, Nemansky District, Kaliningrad Oblast, a settlement under the administrative jurisdiction of Neman Town of District Significance of Nemansky District
- Lesnoye, Pravdinsky District, Kaliningrad Oblast, a settlement in Domnovsky Rural Okrug of Pravdinsky District
- Lesnoye, Svetlogorsky District, Kaliningrad Oblast, a settlement under the administrative jurisdiction of the urban-type settlement of district significance of Primorye, Svetlogorsky District

Historical names

- Lesnoye, name of the settlement of imeni Alexandra Kosmodemyanskogo in 1946–1956; now under the jurisdiction of Oktyabrsky City District of the city of Kaliningrad

== Kaluga Oblast ==
As of 2010, one rural locality in Kaluga Oblast bears this name:

- Lesnoy, Kaluga Oblast, a settlement in Meshchovsky District

== Kamchatka Krai ==
As of 2010, two rural localities in Kamchatka Krai bear this name:

- Lesnoy, Kamchatka Krai, a settlement in Yelizovsky District
- Lesnaya, Kamchatka Krai, a selo in Tigilsky District

== Kemerovo Oblast ==
As of 2010, one rural locality in Kemerovo Oblast bears this name:

- Lesnoy, Kemerovo Oblast, a settlement in Razdolnaya Rural Territory of Guryevsky District

== Khabarovsk Krai ==
As of 2010, two rural localities in Khabarovsk Krai bear this name:

- Lesnoy, Khabarovsk Krai, a settlement in Amursky District
- Lesnoye, Khabarovsk Krai, a selo in Khabarovsky District

== Kirov Oblast ==
As of 2010, one urban locality in Kirov Oblast bears this name:

- Lesnoy, Kirov Oblast, an urban-type settlement in Verkhnekamsky District

== Kostroma Oblast ==
As of 2010, one rural locality in Kostroma Oblast bears this name:

- Lesnoy, Kostroma Oblast, a settlement in Voronskoye Settlement of Sudislavsky District

== Krasnodar Krai ==
As of 2010, three rural localities in Krasnodar Krai bear this name:

- Lesnoy, Belorechensky District, Krasnodar Krai, a settlement in Pshekhsky Rural Okrug of Belorechensky District
- Lesnoy, Uspensky District, Krasnodar Krai, a settlement in Veselovsky Rural Okrug of Uspensky District
- Lesnoye, Krasnodar Krai, a selo in Moldovsky Rural Okrug of Sochi

== Kurgan Oblast ==
As of 2010, three rural localities in Kurgan Oblast bear this name:

- Lesnoy, Kurgan Oblast, a settlement in Markovsky Selsoviet of Ketovsky District
- Lesnoye, Kurgan Oblast, a village in Zauralsky Selsoviet of Kargapolsky District
- Lesnaya, Kurgan Oblast, a village in Trusilovsky Selsoviet of Shumikhinsky District

== Kursk Oblast ==
As of 2010, one rural locality in Kursk Oblast bears this name:

- Lesnoy, Kursk Oblast, a settlement in Nevarsky Selsoviet of Dmitriyevsky District

== Leningrad Oblast ==
As of 2010, two rural localities in Leningrad Oblast bear this name:

- Lesnoy, Leningrad Oblast, a logging depot settlement in Zaboryevskoye Settlement Municipal Formation of Boksitogorsky District
- Lesnoye, Leningrad Oblast, a logging depot settlement in Kuyvozovskoye Settlement Municipal Formation of Vsevolozhsky District

== Mari El Republic ==
As of 2010, three rural localities in the Mari El Republic bear this name:

- Lesnoy, Mari-Tureksky District, Mari El Republic, a settlement in Mari-Bilyamorsky Rural Okrug of Mari-Tureksky District
- Lesnoy, Kuyarsky Rural Okrug, Medvedevsky District, Mari El Republic, a settlement in Kuyarsky Rural Okrug of Medvedevsky District
- Lesnoy, Shoybulaksky Rural Okrug, Medvedevsky District, Mari El Republic, a settlement in Shoybulaksky Rural Okrug of Medvedevsky District

== Republic of Mordovia ==
As of 2010, two rural localities in the Republic of Mordovia bear this name:

- Lesnoy, Bolsheignatovsky District, Republic of Mordovia, a settlement in Protasovsky Selsoviet of Bolsheignatovsky District
- Lesnoy, Zubovo-Polyansky District, Republic of Mordovia, a settlement under the administrative jurisdiction of the work settlement of Yavas, Zubovo-Polyansky District

== Moscow Oblast ==
As of 2010, six inhabited localities in Moscow Oblast bear this name.

Urban localities

- Lesnoy, Pushkinsky District, Moscow Oblast, a work settlement in Pushkinsky District

Rural localities

- Lesnoy, Dmitrovsky District, Moscow Oblast, a settlement in Kulikovskoye Rural Settlement of Dmitrovsky District
- Lesnoy, Klinsky District, Moscow Oblast, a settlement in Nudolskoye Rural Settlement of Klinsky District
- Lesnoy, Kolomensky District, Moscow Oblast, a settlement in Biorkovskoye Rural Settlement of Kolomensky District
- Lesnoye, Lukhovitsky District, Moscow Oblast, a village in Dedinovskoye Rural Settlement of Lukhovitsky District
- Lesnoye, Mozhaysky District, Moscow Oblast, a settlement in Klementyevskoye Rural Settlement of Mozhaysky District

== Nizhny Novgorod Oblast ==
As of 2010, four rural localities in Nizhny Novgorod Oblast bear this name:

- Lesnoy, Dzerzhinsk, Nizhny Novgorod Oblast, a cordon in Pyra Selsoviet of the city of oblast significance of Dzerzhinsk
- Lesnoy, Bogorodsky District, Nizhny Novgorod Oblast, a settlement in Khvoshchevsky Selsoviet of Bogorodsky District
- Lesnoy, Sokolsky District, Nizhny Novgorod Oblast, a settlement in Mezhdurechensky Selsoviet of Sokolsky District
- Lesnaya, Nizhny Novgorod Oblast, a village in Smolkovsky Selsoviet of Gorodetsky District

== Novgorod Oblast ==
As of 2010, three rural localities in Novgorod Oblast bear this name:

- Lesnoy, Novgorod Oblast, a settlement in Pesskoye Settlement of Khvoyninsky District
- Lesnaya, Novgorodsky District, Novgorod Oblast, a village in Lesnovskoye Settlement of Novgorodsky District
- Lesnaya, Volotovsky District, Novgorod Oblast, a village in Gorskoye Settlement of Volotovsky District

== Novosibirsk Oblast ==
As of 2010, one rural locality in Novosibirsk Oblast bears this name:

- Lesnoy, Novosibirsk Oblast, a settlement in Kochenyovsky District

== Omsk Oblast ==
As of 2010, four rural localities in Omsk Oblast bear this name:

- Lesnoy, Isilkulsky District, Omsk Oblast, a settlement in Lesnoy Rural Okrug of Isilkulsky District
- Lesnoy, Lyubinsky District, Omsk Oblast, a settlement in Yuzhno-Lyubinsky Rural Okrug of Lyubinsky District
- Lesnoy, Nizhneomsky District, Omsk Oblast, a settlement in Pautovsky Rural Okrug of Nizhneomsky District
- Lesnoye, Omsk Oblast, a selo in Sosnovsky Rural Okrug of Tavrichesky District

== Orenburg Oblast ==
As of 2010, two rural localities in Orenburg Oblast bear this name:

- Lesnoy, Abdulinsky District, Orenburg Oblast, a settlement in Pervomaysky Selsoviet of Abdulinsky District
- Lesnoy, Kuvandyksky District, Orenburg Oblast, a settlement in Novosarinsky Selsoviet of Kuvandyksky District

== Oryol Oblast ==
As of 2010, two rural localities in Oryol Oblast bear this name:

- Lesnoy, Oryol Oblast, a settlement in Platonovsky Selsoviet of Orlovsky District
- Lesnaya, Oryol Oblast, a village in Bolshekulikovsky Selsoviet of Orlovsky District

== Penza Oblast ==
As of 2010, five rural localities in Penza Oblast bear this name:

- Lesnoy, Gorodishchensky District, Penza Oblast, a settlement in Arkhangelsky Selsoviet of Gorodishchensky District
- Lesnoy, Kolyshleysky District, Penza Oblast, a settlement in Berezovsky Selsoviet of Kolyshleysky District
- Lesnoy, Shemysheysky District, Penza Oblast, a settlement under the administrative jurisdiction of the work settlement of Shemysheyka, Shemysheysky District
- Lesnoy, Vadinsky District, Penza Oblast, a settlement in Sergo-Polivanovsky Selsoviet of Vadinsky District
- Lesnoye, Penza Oblast, a selo in Proletarsky Selsoviet of Zemetchinsky District

== Perm Krai ==
As of 2010, one rural locality in Perm Krai bears this name:

- Lesnoy, Perm Krai, a settlement in Osinsky District

== Primorsky Krai ==
As of 2010, one rural locality in Primorsky Krai bears this name:

- Lesnoye, Primorsky Krai, a selo under the administrative jurisdiction of Lesozavodsk City Under Krai Jurisdiction

== Pskov Oblast ==
As of 2010, three rural localities in Pskov Oblast bear this name:

- Lesnaya, Gdovsky District, Pskov Oblast, a village in Gdovsky District
- Lesnaya, Palkinsky District, Pskov Oblast, a village in Palkinsky District
- Lesnaya, Pskovsky District, Pskov Oblast, a village in Pskovsky District

== Rostov Oblast ==
As of 2010, five rural localities in Rostov Oblast bear this name:

- Lesnoy, Dubovsky District, Rostov Oblast, a khutor in Barabanshchikovskoye Rural Settlement of Dubovsky District
- Lesnoy, Kamensky District, Rostov Oblast, a khutor in Starostanichnoye Rural Settlement of Kamensky District
- Lesnoy, Martynovsky District, Rostov Oblast, a khutor in Maloorlovskoye Rural Settlement of Martynovsky District
- Lesnoy, Matveyevo-Kurgansky District, Rostov Oblast, a khutor in Malokirsanovskoye Rural Settlement of Matveyevo-Kurgansky District
- Lesnoy, Tatsinsky District, Rostov Oblast, a khutor in Verkhneoblivskoye Rural Settlement of Tatsinsky District

== Ryazan Oblast ==
As of 2010, two inhabited localities in Ryazan Oblast bear this name.

Urban localities

- Lesnoy, Shilovsky District, Ryazan Oblast, a work settlement in Shilovsky District

Rural localities

- Lesnoy, Kasimovsky District, Ryazan Oblast, a settlement in Siversky Rural Okrug of Kasimovsky District

== Sakhalin Oblast ==
As of 2010, one rural locality in Sakhalin Oblast bears this name:

- Lesnoye, Sakhalin Oblast, a selo in Korsakovsky District

== Samara Oblast ==
As of 2010, two rural localities in Samara Oblast bear this name:

- Lesnoy, Borsky District, Samara Oblast, a settlement in Borsky District
- Lesnoy, Isaklinsky District, Samara Oblast, a settlement in Isaklinsky District

== Saratov Oblast ==
As of 2010, three rural localities in Saratov Oblast bear this name:

- Lesnoy, Dergachyovsky District, Saratov Oblast, a settlement in Dergachyovsky District
- Lesnoy, Yershovsky District, Saratov Oblast, a settlement in Yershovsky District
- Lesnoye, Saratov Oblast, a selo in Balashovsky District

== Smolensk Oblast ==
As of 2010, two rural localities in Smolensk Oblast bear this name:

- Lesnoy, Smolensk Oblast, a settlement in Borkovskoye Rural Settlement of Demidovsky District
- Lesnoye, Smolensk Oblast, a selo in Vadinskoye Rural Settlement of Safonovsky District

== Sverdlovsk Oblast ==
As of 2010, two inhabited localities in Sverdlovsk Oblast bear this name.

Urban localities

- Lesnoy, Sverdlovsk Oblast, a town under the administrative jurisdiction of the closed administrative-territorial formation of the same name

Rural localities

- Lesnoy, Irbitsky District, Sverdlovsk Oblast, a settlement in Irbitsky District

== Tambov Oblast ==
As of 2010, two rural localities in Tambov Oblast bear this name:

- Lesnoy, Kirsanovsky District, Tambov Oblast, a settlement in Uvarovshchinsky Selsoviet of Kirsanovsky District
- Lesnoy, Tambovsky District, Tambov Oblast, a settlement under the administrative jurisdiction of Novolyadinsky Settlement Council of Tambovsky District

== Republic of Tatarstan ==
As of 2010, one rural locality in the Republic of Tatarstan bears this name:

- Lesnoy, Republic of Tatarstan, a settlement in Tyulyachinsky District

== Tula Oblast ==
As of 2010, four rural localities in Tula Oblast bear this name:

- Lesnoy, Dubensky District, Tula Oblast, a settlement in Gvardeysky Rural Okrug of Dubensky District
- Lesnoy, Leninsky District, Tula Oblast, a settlement in Zaytsevsky Rural Okrug of Leninsky District
- Lesnoy, Shchyokinsky District, Tula Oblast, a settlement in Krapivenskaya Rural Administration of Shchyokinsky District
- Lesnoy, Uzlovsky District, Tula Oblast, a settlement in Kamenskaya Rural Administration of Uzlovsky District

== Tver Oblast ==
As of 2010, five rural localities in Tver Oblast bear this name:

- Lesnoy, Firovsky District, Tver Oblast, a settlement in Firovsky District
- Lesnoy, Kimrsky District, Tver Oblast, a settlement in Kimrsky District
- Lesnoye, Tver Oblast, a selo in Lesnoy District
- Lesnaya, Toropetsky District, Tver Oblast, a village in Toropetsky District
- Lesnaya, Torzhoksky District, Tver Oblast, a village in Torzhoksky District

== Tyumen Oblast ==
As of 2010, three rural localities in Tyumen Oblast bear this name:

- Lesnoy, Abatsky District, Tyumen Oblast, a settlement in Leninsky Rural Okrug of Abatsky District
- Lesnoy, Zavodoukovsky District, Tyumen Oblast, a settlement in Zavodoukovsky District
- Lesnoye, Tyumen Oblast, a selo in Lesnoy Rural Okrug of Yurginsky District

== Udmurt Republic ==
As of 2010, one rural locality in the Udmurt Republic bears this name:

- Lesnoy, Udmurt Republic, a village in Melnikovsky Selsoviet of Mozhginsky District

== Ulyanovsk Oblast ==
As of 2010, two rural localities in Ulyanovsk Oblast bear this name:

- Lesnoy, Melekessky District, Ulyanovsk Oblast, a settlement under the administrative jurisdiction of Mullovsky Settlement Okrug of Melekessky District
- Lesnoy, Sengileyevsky District, Ulyanovsk Oblast, a settlement in Novoslobodsky Rural Okrug of Sengileyevsky District

== Vladimir Oblast ==
As of 2010, one rural locality in Vladimir Oblast bears this name:

- Lesnaya, Vladimir Oblast, a village in Gus-Khrustalny District

== Volgograd Oblast ==
As of 2010, one rural locality in Volgograd Oblast bears this name:

- Lesnoy, Volgograd Oblast, a khutor in Sarpinsky Selsoviet of Volgograd

== Vologda Oblast ==
As of 2010, one rural locality in Vologda Oblast bears this name:

- Lesnoye, Vologda Oblast, a settlement in Domozerovsky Selsoviet of Cherepovetsky District

== Yaroslavl Oblast ==
As of 2010, one rural locality in Yaroslavl Oblast bears this name:

- Lesnoy, Yaroslavl Oblast, a settlement in Lyubilkovsky Rural Okrug of Rostovsky District

== Zabaykalsky Krai ==
As of 2010, one rural locality in Zabaykalsky Krai bears this name:

- Lesnaya, Zabaykalsky Krai, a settlement at the station in Chitinsky District
