= Tayozhny =

Tayozhny/Tayezhny (Russian: Таёжный; masculine), Tayozhnaya/Tayezhnaya (Таёжная; feminine), or Tayozhnoye/Tayezhnoye (Таёжное; neuter) is the name of several inhabited localities in Russia.

Urban localities

- Tayozhny, Khanty-Mansi Autonomous Okrug, an urban-type settlement in Sovetsky District of Khanty-Mansi Autonomous Okrug

Rural localities

- Tayozhny, Amur Oblast, a settlement in Dzhalindinsky Rural Settlement of Skovorodinsky District in Amur Oblast; 53°39′N 123°51′E
- Tayozhny, Arkhangelsk Oblast, a settlement in Shilegsky Selsoviet of Pinezhsky District in Arkhangelsk Oblast; 64°3′N 44°3′E
- Tayozhny, Republic of Buryatia, a settlement in Iroysky Somon of Selenginsky District in the Republic of Buryatia; 51°13′N 105°43′E
- Tayozhny, Nizhneudinsky District, Irkutsk Oblast, an area in Nizhneudinsky District of Irkutsk Oblast
- Tayozhny, Shelekhovsky District, Irkutsk Oblast, a settlement in Shelekhovsky District of Irkutsk Oblast
- Tayozhny, Zalarinsky District, Irkutsk Oblast, an area in Zalarinsky District of Irkutsk Oblast
- Tayozhny, Kamchatka Krai, a settlement in Milkovsky District of Kamchatka Krai
- Tayozhny, Kemerovo Oblast, a settlement under the administrative jurisdiction of Tayga Town Under Oblast Jurisdiction in Kemerovo Oblast
- Tayozhny, Boguchansky District, Krasnoyarsk Krai, a settlement in Tayozhninsky Selsoviet of Boguchansky District in Krasnoyarsk Krai
- Tayozhny, Kezhemsky District, Krasnoyarsk Krai, a settlement in Tayozhinsky Selsoviet of Kezhemsky District in Krasnoyarsk Krai
- Tayozhny, Perm Krai, a settlement in Permsky District of Perm Krai
- Tayezhny, Primorsky Krai, a settlement in Nadezhdinsky District of Primorsky Krai
- Tayozhny, Alapayevsky District, Sverdlovsk Oblast, a settlement in Tayozhny Selsoviet of Alapayevsky District in Sverdlovsk Oblast
- Tayozhny, Lesnoy, Sverdlovsk Oblast, a settlement under the administrative jurisdiction of Yelkino Work Settlement under the administrative jurisdiction of the closed administrative-territorial formation of Lesnoy in Sverdlovsk Oblast
- Tayozhnoye, Khabarovsk Krai, a selo in Khabarovsky District of Khabarovsk Krai
- Tayozhnoye, Krasnoyarsk Krai, a selo in Tayozhensky Selsoviet of Kansky District in Krasnoyarsk Krai
- Tayozhnoye, Primorsky Krai, a selo in Krasnoarmeysky District of Primorsky Krai
- Tayozhnaya, a village in Borodinsky Selsoviet of Bogradsky District in the Republic of Khakassia
