= Skovorodino =

Skovorodino may refer to:

- Skovorodino Urban Settlement, an administrative division and a municipal formation which the town of Skovorodino and the settlement of Lesnoy in Skovorodinsky District of Amur Oblast, Russia are incorporated as
- Skovorodino (inhabited locality), several inhabited localities in Russia
- Skovorodino railway station, a railway station on the Baikal-Amur Mainline in the town of Skovorodino in Amur Oblast, Russia
