= Udomelsky District =

Udomelsky District Удомельский район (Russian)
- District
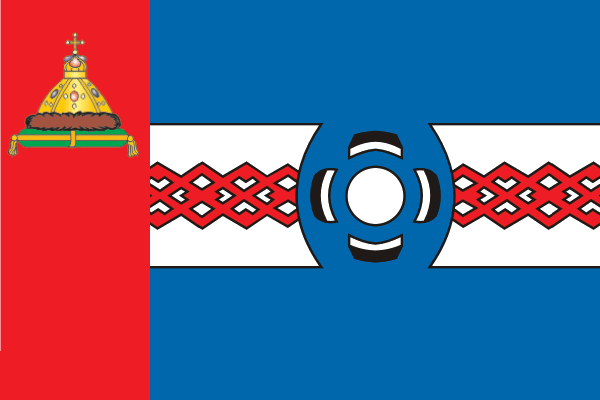
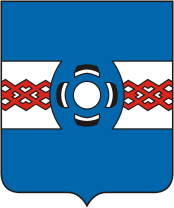
- Flag Coat of arms
- Location of Udomelsky District in Tver Oblast
- Coordinates: 57°52′N 35°01′E
- Country: Russia
- Federal subject: Tver Oblast
- Established: 1929
- Administrative center: Udomlya

Area
  - Total: 2,476.2 km^{2} (956.1 sq mi)

Population (2010 Census)
  - Total: 40,292
  - Density: 16.272/km^{2} (42.144/sq mi)
  - Urban: 77.1%
  - Rural: 22.9%

Administrative structure
  - Administrative divisions: 1 Urban settlements, 11 Rural settlements
  - Inhabited localities: 1 cities/towns, 304 rural localities

Municipal structure
  - Municipally incorporated as: Udomelsky Municipal District
  - Municipal divisions: 1 urban settlements, 11 rural settlements
- Time zone: UTC+3 (MSK)
- OKTMO ID: 28656000
- Website: http://udomlya-region.ru/

Udomelsky District (Russian: Удо́мельский райо́н) is an administrative and municipal district (raion), one of the thirty-six in Tver Oblast, Russia. It is located in the north of the oblast and borders with Moshenskoy District of Novgorod Oblast in the north, Lesnoy District in the northeast, Maksatikhinsky District in the east, Vyshnevolotsky District in the south, Bologovsky District in the west, and with Borovichsky District of Novgorod Oblast in the west. The area of the district is 2,476.2 square kilometers (956.1 sq mi). Its administrative center is the town of Udomlya. Population: 40,292 (2010 Census); 10,401 (2002 census); 12,426 (1989 Soviet census). The population of Udomlya accounts for 77.1% of the district's total population.

== Geography ==
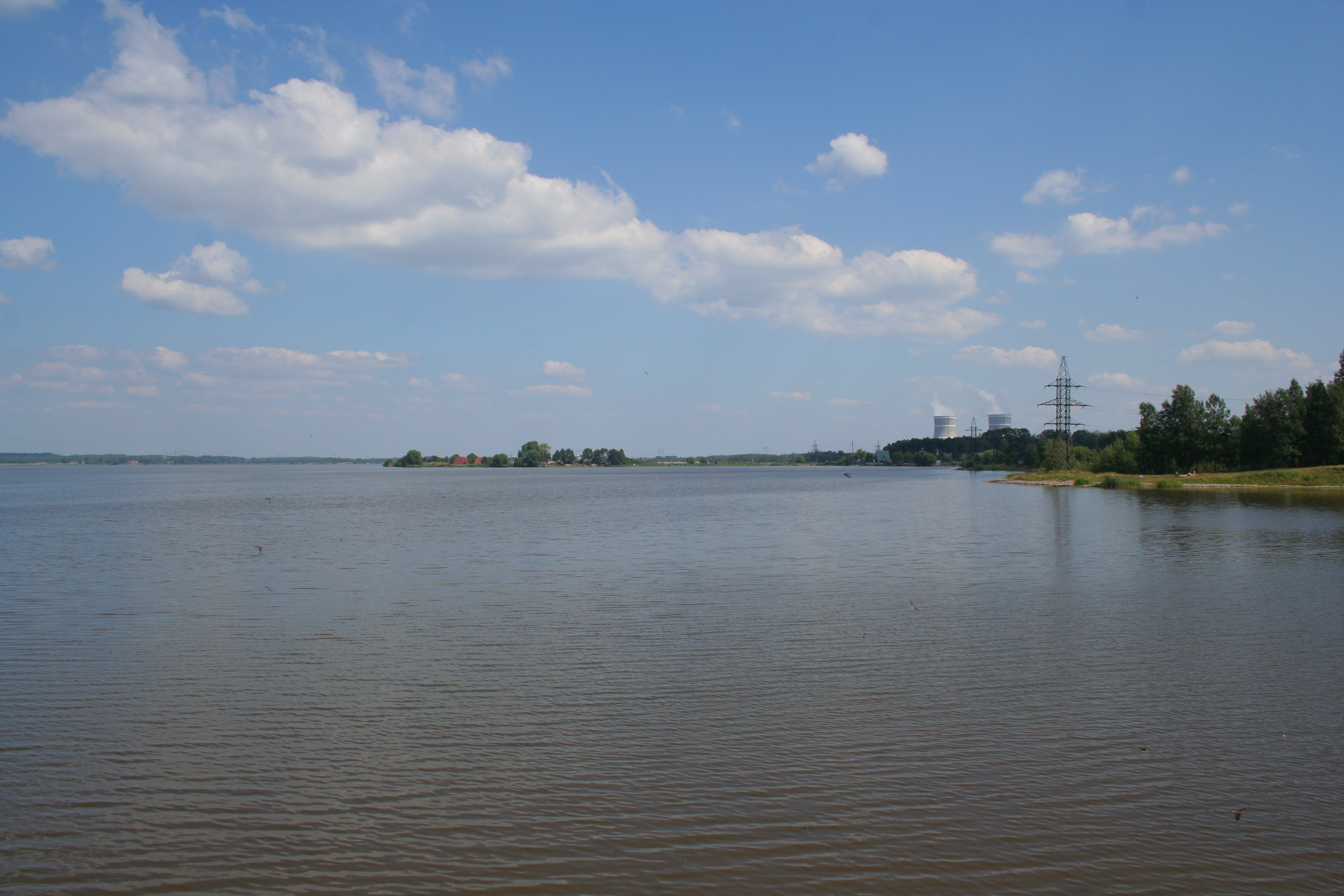
Lake Pesvo

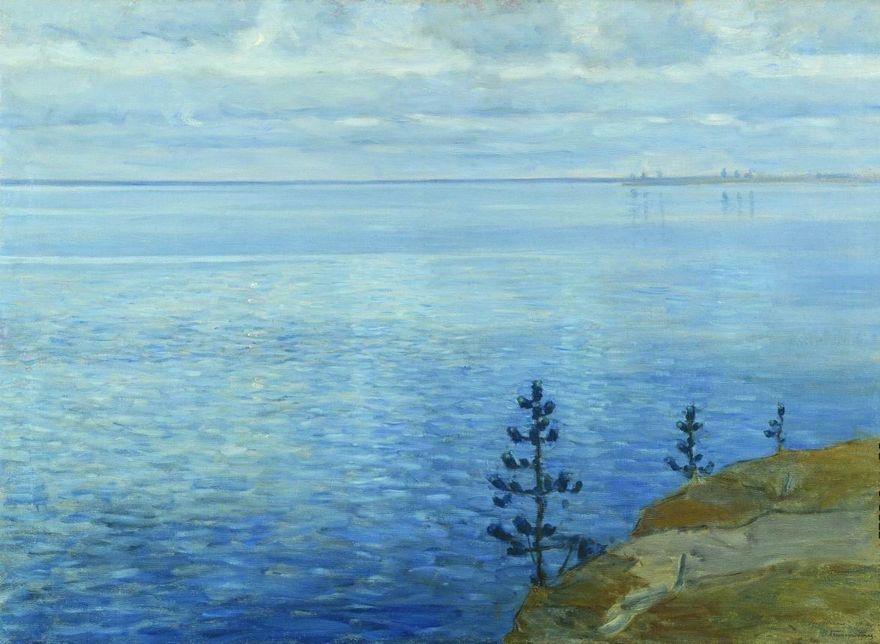
Lake Udomlya by Vitold Byalynitsky-Birulya

The district lies in the southeastern part of the Valdai Hills and is split between the drainage basins of the Baltic and Caspian Seas. The rivers in the western part of the district drain into the Msta, a major tributary of Lake Ilmen, which belongs to the basin of the Neva and thus of the Baltic Sea. The Msta itself crosses the southwestern part of the district and makes a stretch of the border between Udomelsky and Bologovsky Districts. The central and the eastern parts of the district belong to the basin of the Mologa, a tributary of the Rybinsk Reservoir in the basin of the Volga which drains into Caspian Sea. Udomelsky District is a part of the lake district located in the Valdai Hills, with the largest lakes within the district being Lake Udomlya, Lake Pesvo, and Lake Navolok, all in the drainage basin of the Msta. Most of the district area is covered by forest.

== History ==
The area of the district was originally populated by the Finnic peoples, in the 11th century, Slavs started to arrive. Until the 15th century, the area belonged to the Novgorod Republic, and subsequently, together with Novgorod, it was annexed by the Grand Duchy of Moscow. The area belonged to Bezhetsk Pyatina, one of the five pyatinas into which Novgorod Lands were divided.

In the course of the administrative reform carried out in 1708 by Peter the Great, the area was included into Ingermanland Governorate (since 1710 known as Saint Petersburg Governorate), and in 1727 Novgorod Governorate split off. In 1775, Tver Viceroyalty was formed from the lands which previously belonged to Moscow and Novgorod Governorates. In 1770, the area was included into Vyshnevolotsky Uyezd of Tver Governorate, and between 1775 and 1796 it belonged to Tver Viceroyalty, which was subsequently transformed back to Tver Governorate. In the 1870s, the railroad was open, which led to quick development of the area.

On July 12, 1929 the governorates and uyezds were abolished. Udomelsky District, with the administrative center in the railway station of Udomlya, was established within Tver Okrug of Moscow Oblast. On July 23, 1930, the okrugs were abolished, and the districts were directly subordinated to the oblast. On January 29, 1935 Kalinin Oblast was established, and Udomelsky District was transferred to Kalinin Oblast. In January 1961 Udomlya was granted work settlement status. In February 1963, during the abortive administrative reform by Nikita Khrushchev, Udomelsky District was merged into Bologovsky District, but in January 1965 it was re-established. Between 1974 and 1984, the Kalinin Nuclear Power Plant was constructed. On September 11, 1981 Udomlya was granted town status. In 1990, Kalinin Oblast was renamed Tver Oblast.

On June 1, 1936 Brusovsky District with the administrative center in the settlement of Brusovo was established as a part of Kalinin Oblast. On November 14, 1960 it was abolished and split between Maksatikhinsky and Udomelsky Districts.

== Economy ==
=== Industry ===
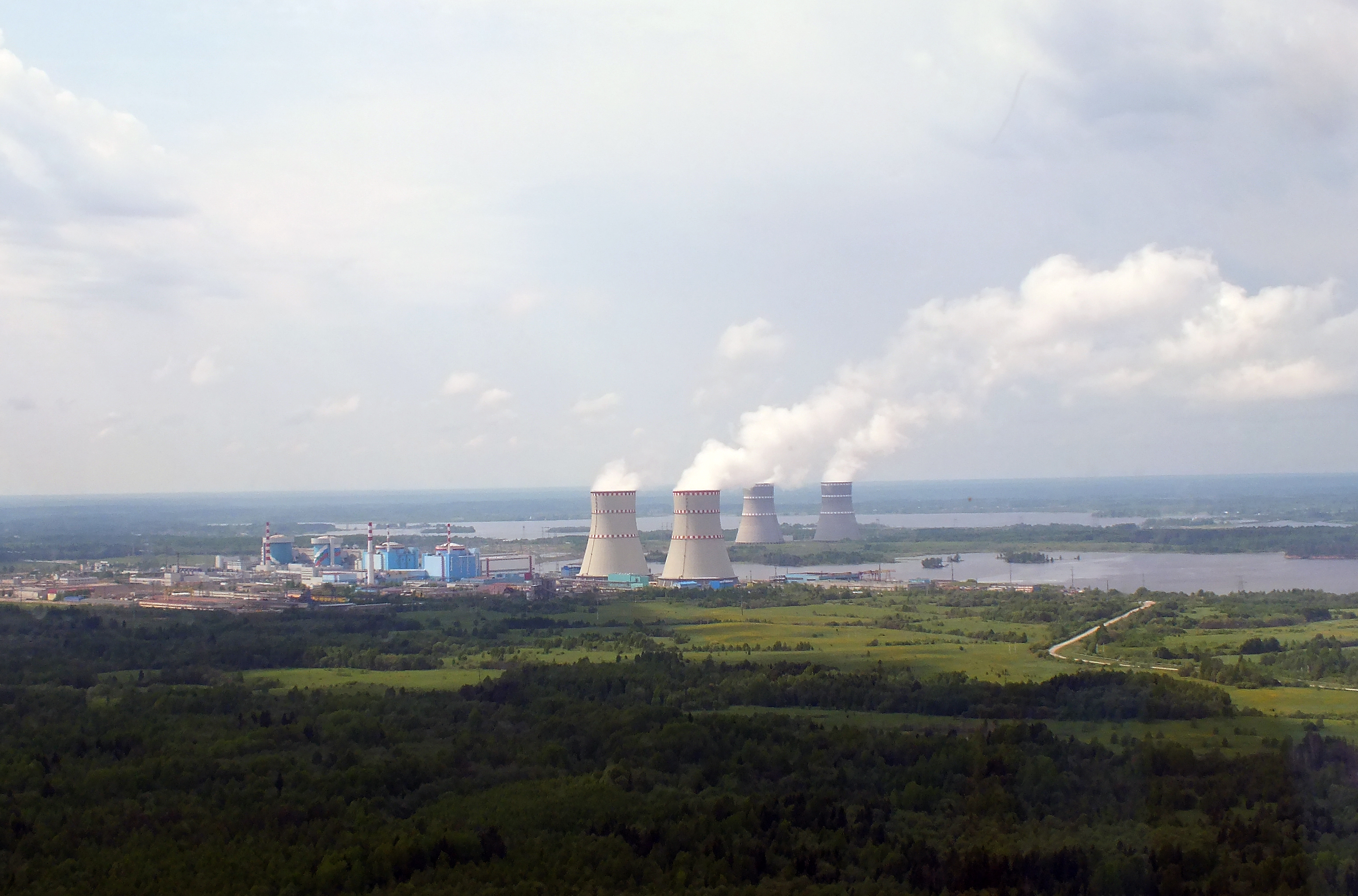
Kalinin Nuclear Power Plant

The main industrial enterprise in the district is the Kalinin Nuclear Power Plant, located in Udomlya. There are also enterprises of timber and food industries.

=== Agriculture ===
The main agricultural specialization of the district is cattle breeding with meat and milk production. Fish farming is also significant.

=== Transportation ===
The railway connecting Rybinsk and Bologoye via Bezhetsk crosses the district from east to west. Udomlya is the principal station within the district.

The road which connects Maksatikha and Vyshny Volochyok crosses the southern tip of the district. Udomlya has an access to this road. There are also local roads, with bus traffic originating from Udomlya. No roads cross the borders into Novgorod Oblast, Lesnoy, or Bologovsky Districts.

== Culture and recreation ==
The district contains four cultural heritage monuments of federal significance and additionally thirty-seven objects classified as cultural and historical heritage of local significance. The federal monuments are the tomb of artist Alexey Venetsianov in the selo of Venetsianovo, as well as three archeological sites.

There is a local museum in Udomlya. The former Datcha Chayka on the shores of Lake Udomlya, which belonged to artist Vitold Byalynitsky-Birulya, is also open as a museum.
