= Segachama =

Segachama Сегачама
- Passing loop
- Location within Amur Oblast Location within Russia
- Coordinates: 54°00′N 122°06′E
- Country: Russia
- Region: Amur Oblast
- District: Skovorodinsky District
- Time zone: UTC+9:00

Segachama (Russian: Сегачама) is a rural locality (a passing loop) in Rabochy Posyolok Erofey Pavlovich of Skovorodinsky District, Amur Oblast, Russia. The population was 45 as of 2018.

== Geography ==
Segachama is located 168 km west of Skovorodino (the district's administrative centre) by road. Bolshaya Omutnaya is the nearest rural locality.
