= Oldoy =

Oldoy Ольдой
- Settlement
- Location within Amur Oblast Location within Russia
- Coordinates: 54°05′N 123°30′E
- Country: Russia
- Region: Amur Oblast
- District: Skovorodinsky District
- Time zone: UTC+9:00

Oldoy (Russian: Ольдой) is a rural locality (a settlement) in Takhtamygdinsky Selsoviet of Skovorodinsky District, Amur Oblast, Russia. The population was 21 as of 2018.

== Geography ==
Oldoy is located 45 km west of Skovorodino (the district's administrative centre) by road. Takhtamygda is the nearest rural locality.
