= Udomlya =

Town in Tver Oblast, Russia

Udomlya Удомля
- Town
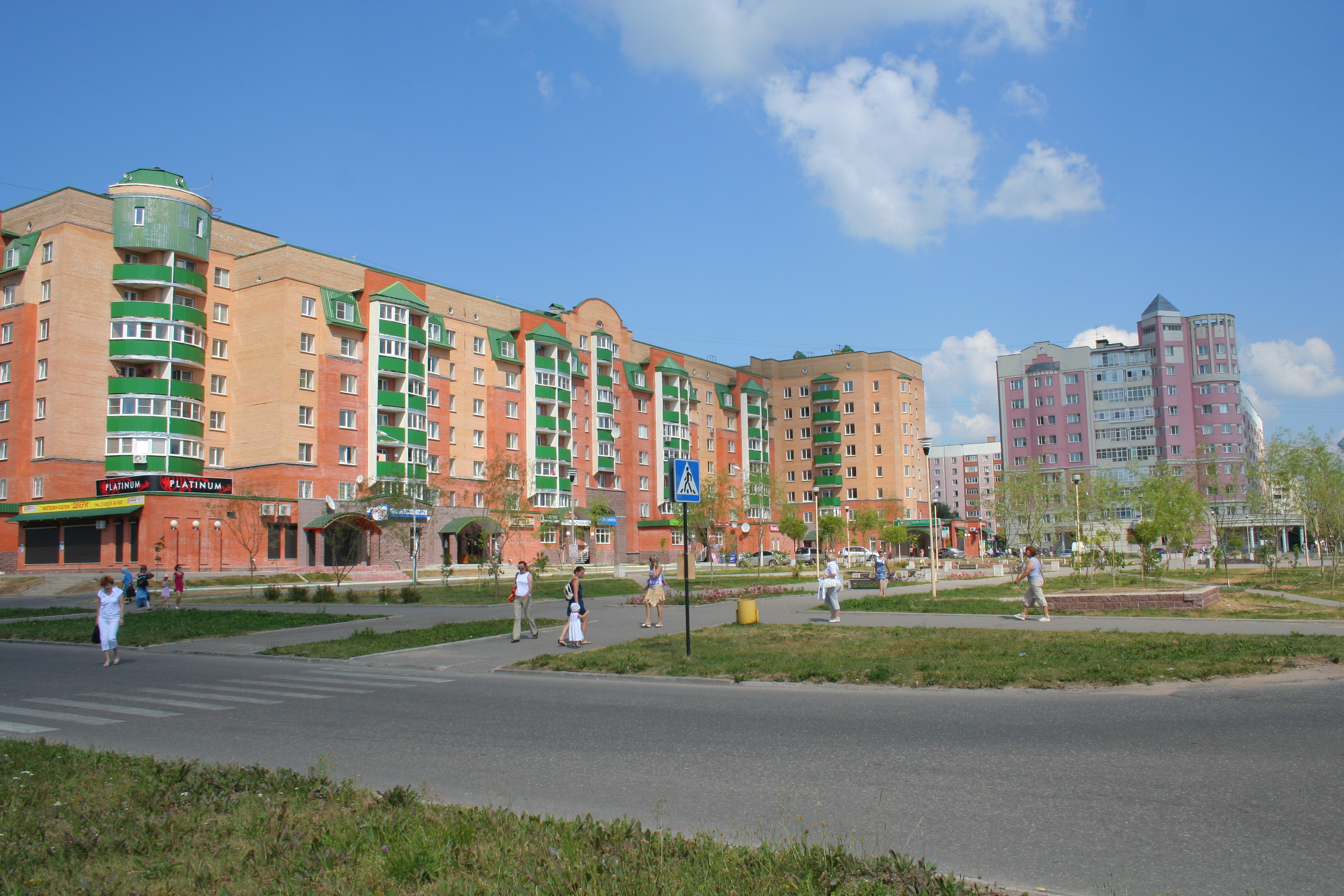
- Central square in Udomlya

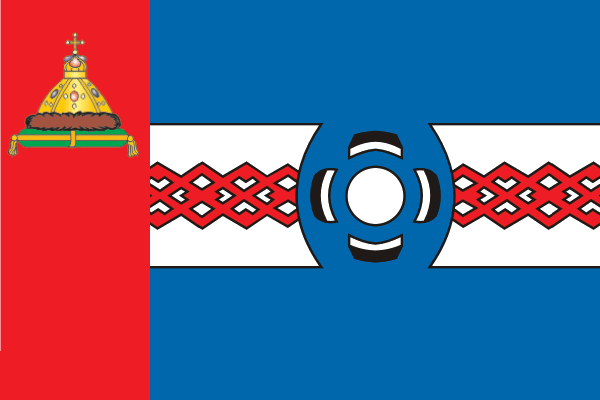
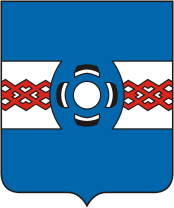
- Flag Coat of arms
- Interactive map of Udomlya
- Location of Udomlya Udomlya (Tver Oblast)
- Coordinates: 57°53′N 35°00′E
- Country: Russia
- Federal subject: Tver Oblast
- Administrative district: Udomelsky District
- Urban settlementSelsoviet: Udomlya
- Founded: 1869
- Town status since: September 11, 1981
- Elevation: 165 m (541 ft)

Population (2010 Census)
  - Total: 31,061
  - Estimate (2021): 25,950 (−16.5%)

Administrative status
  - Capital of: Udomelsky District, Udomlya Urban Settlement

Municipal status
  - Municipal district: Udomelsky Municipal District
  - Urban settlement: Udomlya Urban Settlement
  - Capital of: Udomelsky Municipal District, Udomlya Urban Settlement
- Time zone: UTC+3 (MSK)
- Postal code: 171841–171843
- OKTMO ID: 28751000001
- Website: gorod-udomlya.ru

Udomlya (Russian: Удо́мля) is a town and the administrative center of Udomelsky District in Tver Oblast, Russia, located on the shores of Lake Pesvo on the Rybinsk–Bologoye railway, 225 kilometers (140 mi) north of Tver, the administrative center of the oblast. Population: 31,061 (2010 census); 31,961 (2002 census); 30,751 (1989 Soviet census).

== History ==
It was founded in 1869 as a settlement serving the railway station of Troitsa (Троица). At the time, it was a part of Vyshnevolotsky Uyezd of Tver Governorate. Troitsa was renamed Udomlya in 1904.

On July 12, 1929, the governorates and uyezds were abolished. Udomelsky District, with the administrative center in Udomlya, was established within Tver Okrug of Moscow Oblast. On July 23, 1930, the okrugs were abolished and the districts were directly subordinated to the oblast. On January 29, 1935, Udomelsky District was transferred to newly established Kalinin Oblast. In January 1961, Udomlya was granted work settlement status. In February 1963, during the abortive administrative reform by Nikita Khrushchev, Udomelsky District was merged into Bologovsky District, but in January 1965 it was re-established. Between 1974 and 1984, the Kalinin Nuclear Power Plant was constructed. On September 11, 1981, Udomlya was granted town status. In 1990, Kalinin Oblast was renamed Tver Oblast.

== Administrative and municipal status ==
Within the framework of administrative divisions, Udomlya serves as the administrative center of Udomelsky District. As an administrative division, it is incorporated within Udomelsky District as Udomlya Urban Settlement. As a municipal division, this administrative unit also has urban settlement status and is a part of Udomelsky Municipal District.

== Economy ==
=== Industry ===
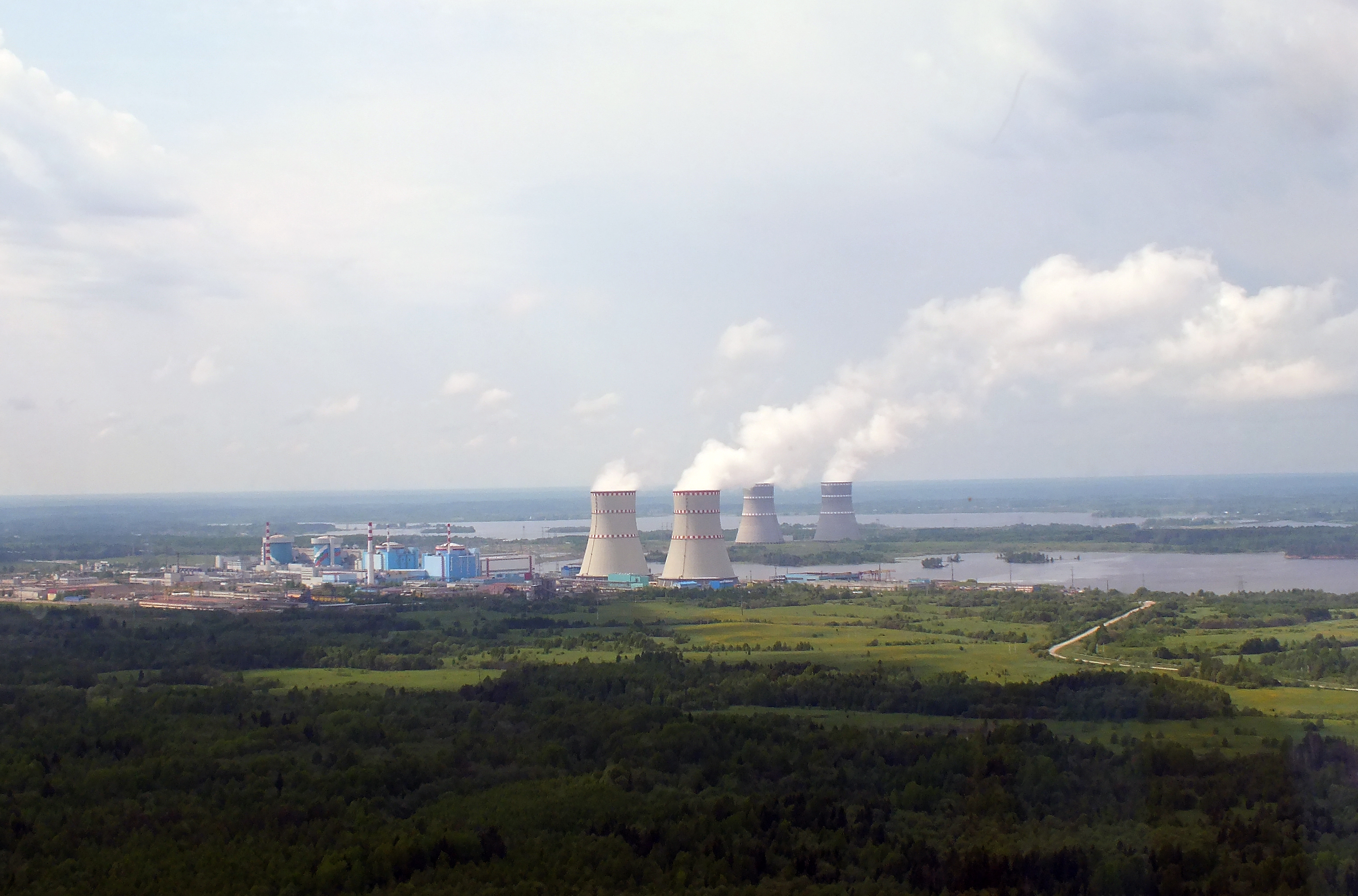
Kalinin Nuclear Power Plant

The main industrial enterprise in Udomlya is the Kalinin Nuclear Power Plant (98% volume of industrial production in Udomlya District, 70% of electric power produced in Tver Oblast and 2,5 % of goods and products of Tver Oblast). There are also enterprises of timber and food industries.

=== Transportation ===
The railway connecting Rybinsk and Bologoye via Bezhetsk passes Udomlya.

Udomlya has access to the road which connects Maksatikha and Vyshny Volochyok. There are also local roads, with bus traffic originating from Udomlya.

== Culture and recreation ==
Udomlya contains four objects classified as cultural and historical heritage of local significance, which are the Gudzovsky warehouse, built in 1882, a building where a Young Pioneer club was located, a monument to soldiers fallen in World War II, and a monument to Alexander Popov.

There is a local museum in Udomlya. The former Dacha Chayka on the shores of Lake Udomlya, located close to the town, which belonged to artist Vitold Byalynitsky-Birulya, is also open as a museum.

Russian painters Alexey Venetsianov in the 19th century and Isaac Levitan at the turn of the 20th century lived and worked in the surroundings of Udomlya.
