= Ulruchyi =

Ulruchyi Ульручьи
- Station
- Location within Amur Oblast Location within Russia
- Coordinates: 53°50′N 124°12′E
- Country: Russia
- Region: Amur Oblast
- District: Skovorodinsky District
- Time zone: UTC+9:00

Ulruchyi (Russian: Ульручьи) is a rural locality (a station) in Neversky Selsoviet of Skovorodinsky District, Amur Oblast, Russia. The population was 165 as of 2018. There are 2 streets.

== Geography ==
Ulruchyi is located 36 km southeast of Skovorodino (the district's administrative centre) by road. Kovali is the nearest rural locality.
