= Sgibeyevo =

Sgibeyevo Сгибеево
- Station
- Location within Amur Oblast Location within Russia
- Coordinates: 54°04′N 122°42′E
- Country: Russia
- Region: Amur Oblast
- District: Skovorodinsky District
- Time zone: UTC+9:00

Sgibeyevo (Russian: Сгибеево) is a rural locality (a station) in Rabochy Posylok Urusha of Skovorodinsky District, Amur Oblast, Russia. The population was 2 as of 2018. There is 1 street.

== Geography ==
Sgibeyevo is located 106 km west of Skovorodino (the district's administrative centre) by road. Urusha is the nearest rural locality.
