= Skovorodino (inhabited locality) =

Skovorodino (Russian: Сковородино) is the name of several inhabited localities in Russia.

Urban localities

- Skovorodino, Amur Oblast, a town in Skovorodinsky District of Amur Oblast

Rural localities

- Skovorodino, Moscow Oblast, a village in Shemetovskoye Rural Settlement of Sergiyevo-Posadsky District of Moscow Oblast
