= Tayozhny, Amur Oblast =

Tayozhny Таёжный
- Settlement
- Location within Amur Oblast Location within Russia
- Coordinates: 53°38′N 123°51′E
- Country: Russia
- Region: Amur Oblast
- District: Skovorodinsky District
- Time zone: UTC+9:00

Tayozhny (Russian: Таёжный) is a rural locality (a settlement) in Dzhalindinsky Selsoviet of Skovorodinsky District, Amur Oblast, Russia. The population was 45 as of 2018. There are 5 streets.

== Geography ==
Tayozhny is located 48 km south of Skovorodino (the district's administrative centre) by road. Srednereynovsky is the nearest rural locality.
