= Vasily Aksyonov (physicist) =

Russian scientist

Vasily Ivanovich Aksyonov Василий Иванович Аксёнов
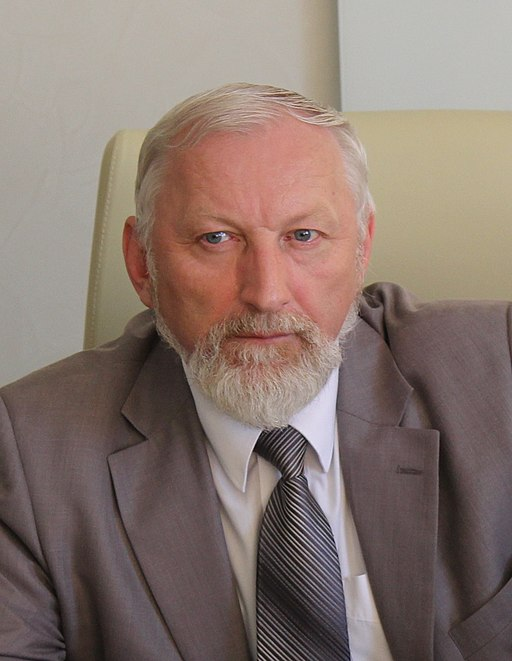
- Born: 6 June 1957; Moscow
- Education: Moscow Power Engineering Institute
- Scientific career
- Fields: nuclear power engineering

Vasily Ivanovich Aksyonov (Russian: Василий Иванович Аксёнов; born 6 June 1957) is a Soviet and Russian scientist in the field of nuclear physics, сandidate of Sciences.

== Biography ==
Aksyonov was born on 6 June 1957 in Tver Oblast.

In 1981 he graduated from the Moscow Power Engineering Institute with a degree in Nuclear Power Plants and Installations.

After graduation, he began working at the Kalinin Nuclear Power Plant. He was a senior operator, senior reactor engineer, shift supervisor, reactor manager, chief engineer, deputy Kalinin NPP, in 2005 he was promoted to director.

In 2007–2008, he held the post of Deputy Technical Director for the new blocks of Rosenergoatom Concern. Since March 2008 - First Deputy General Director of OJSC Atomenergoremont. Since January 2015 - Director of the Moscow Center of the World Association of Operators of Nuclear Power Plants.

He was a deputy of the Legislative Assembly of the Tver region.

He was awarded the medal of the Order of Merit for the Fatherland II degree (2005).
