= Bolshaya Omutnaya =

Bolshaya Omutnaya Большая Омутная
- Station
- Location within Amur Oblast Location within Russia
- Coordinates: 54°01′N 122°15′E
- Country: Russia
- Region: Amur Oblast
- District: Skovorodinsky District
- Time zone: UTC+9:00

Bolshaya Omutnaya (Russian: Большая Омутная) is a rural locality (a station) in Rabochy Posyolok Erofey Pavlovich of Skovorodinsky District, Amur Oblast, Russia. The population was 177 as of 2018.

== Geography ==
Bolshaya Omutnaya is located 133 km west of Skovorodino (the district's administrative centre) by road. Yerofey Pavlovich is the nearest rural locality.
