= Byalynichy district =

District of Mogilev region, Belarus

Byalynichy district Бялыніцкі раён (Belarusian)
- District
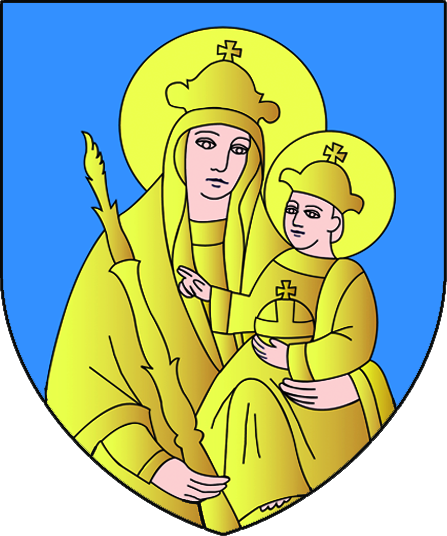
- Flag Seal

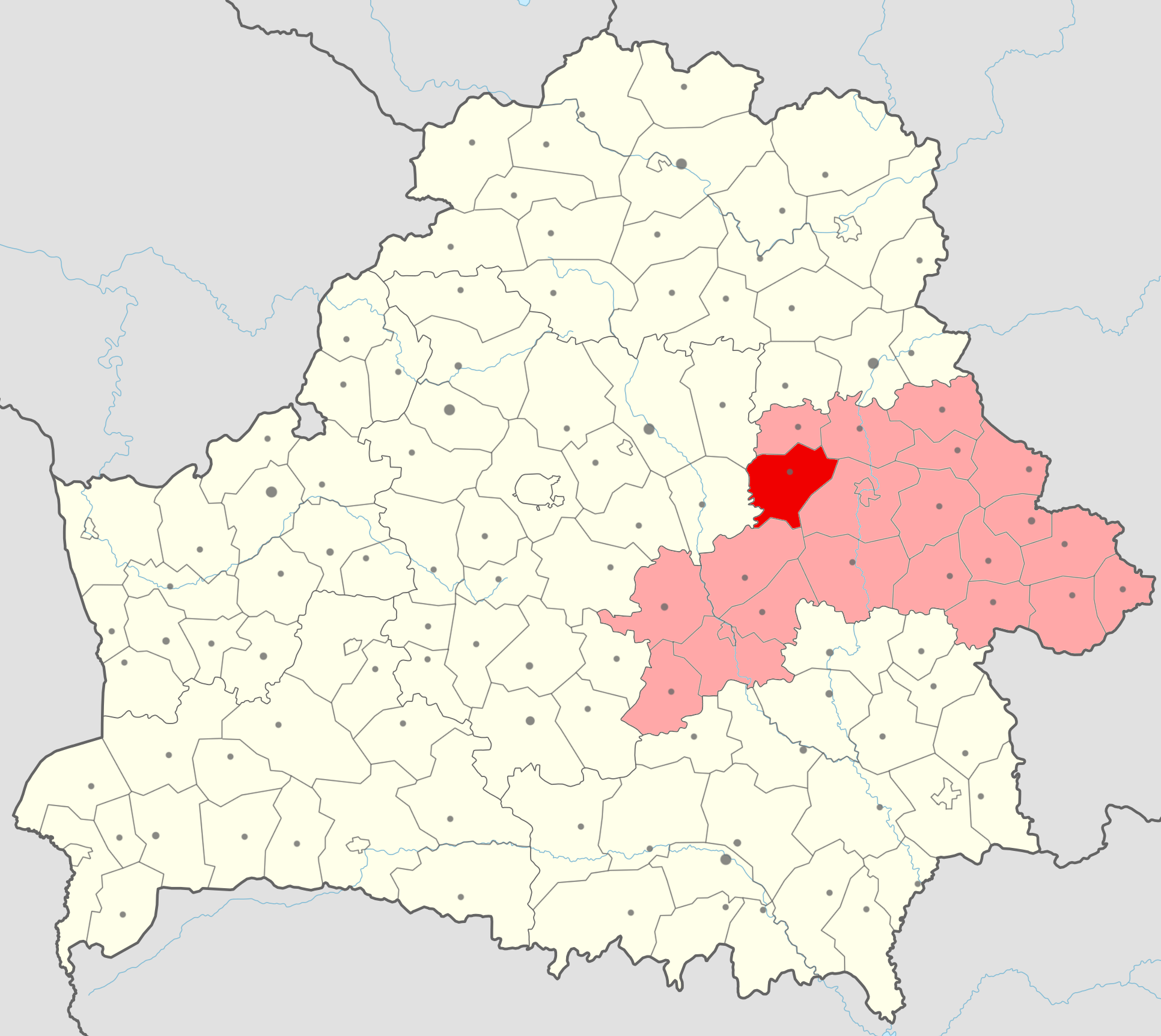
- Coordinates: 53°59′44″N 29°42′34″E
- Country: Belarus
- Region: Mogilev region
- Administrative center: Byalynichy

Area
  - District: 1,419.52 km^{2} (548.08 sq mi)
- Elevation: 168 m (551 ft)

Population (2024)
  - District: 17,504
  - Density: 12.331/km^{2} (31.937/sq mi)
  - Urban: 9,670
  - Rural: 7,834
- Time zone: UTC+3 (MSK)

Byalynichy district or Bialyničy district (Belarusian: Бялыніцкі раён; Russian: Белыничский район, romanized: Belynichsky rayon) is a district (raion) of Mogilev region in Belarus. Its administrative center is the town of Byalynichy. As of 2009, its population was 21,839; the population accounted for 48.9% of the district's population. As of 2024, it has a population of 17,504.

== Notable residents ==
- Vitold Byalynitsky-Birulya (1872, Krynki village – 1957), Belarusian landscape painter
