= Rameshki, Rameshkovsky District, Tver Oblast =

Urban-type settlement in Russia

Rameshki Рамешки
- Work settlement
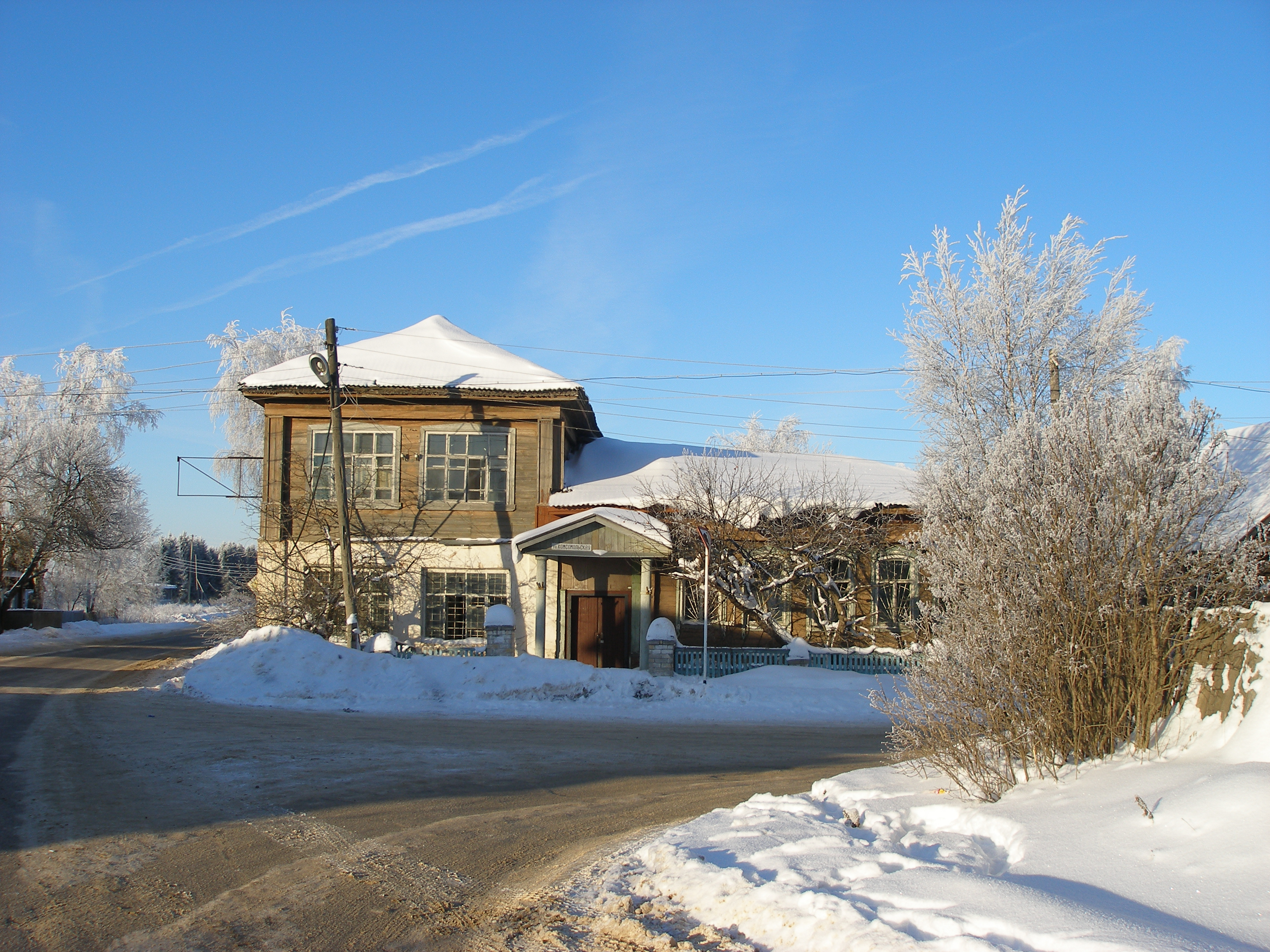

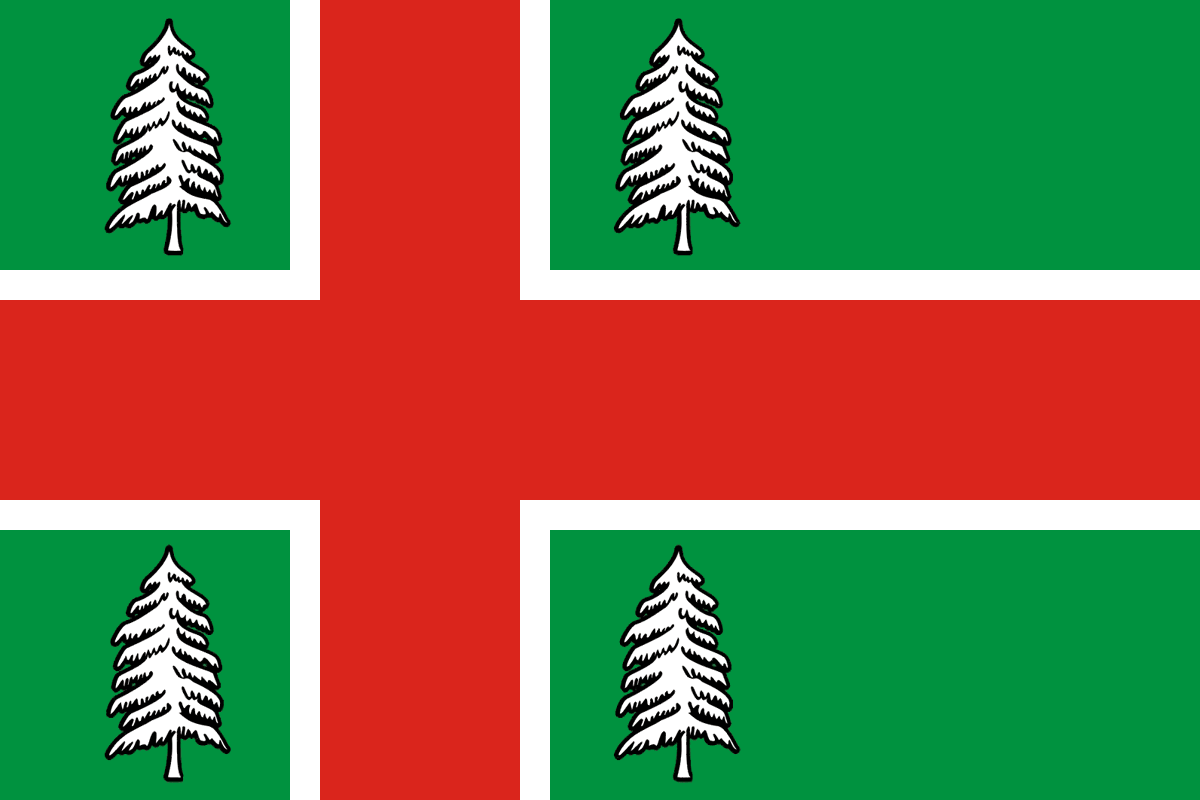
- Flag
- Interactive map of Rameshki
- Location of Rameshki Rameshki (Tver Oblast)
- Coordinates: 57°20′41″N 36°02′37″E
- Country: Russia
- Federal subject: Tver Oblast
- Administrative district: Rameshkovsky District

Population (2010 Census)
  - Total: 4,318
  - Estimate (2021): 4,102 (−5%)

Administrative status
  - Capital of: Rameshkovsky District

Municipal status
  - Municipal district: Rameshkovsky Municipal District
  - Urban settlement: Rameshkovskoye Urban Settlement
  - Capital of: Rameshkovsky Municipal District, Rameshkovskoye Urban Settlement
- Time zone: UTC+3 (MSK)
- Postal code: 171400
- OKTMO ID: 28647151051

Rameshki (Russian: Ра́мешки) is an urban-type settlement and the administrative center of Rameshkovsky District of Tver Oblast, Russia. Population: 4,318 (2010 census); 4,246 (2002 census); 4,390 (1989 Soviet census). It is located close to the left bank of the Medveditsa River.

== History ==
The origin of Rameshki is unclear, since the settlement changed the name at some point. The village of Ramenki was mentioned in 1551, and it is possible that this is the same settlement which later became Rameshki.

In the course of the administrative reform carried out in 1708 by Peter the Great, the area was included into Ingermanland Governorate (known since 1710 as Saint Petersburg Governorate), but in 1727 it was transferred to Moscow Governorate. In 1775, Tver Viceroyalty was formed from the lands which previously belonged to Moscow and Novgorod Governorates, and Rameshki was transferred to Tver Viceroyalty, which in 1796 was transformed to Tver Governorate. It belonged to Bezhetsky Uyezd.

On July 12, 1929 the governorates and uyezds were abolished. Rameshkovsky District, with the administrative center in Rameshki, was established within Tver Okrug of Moscow Oblast. On July 23, 1930, the okrugs were abolished, and the districts were directly subordinated to the oblast. On January 29, 1935 Kalinin Oblast was established, and Rameshkovsky District was transferred to Kalinin Oblast. On July 9, 1937 Rameshkovsky District was included into Karelian National Okrug, which was established as a Tver Karelians autonomy. On February 7, 1939 the okrug was abolished. In 1990, Kalinin Oblast was renamed Tver Oblast.

== Economy ==
=== Industry ===
In Rameshki, there are industrial enterprises of timber and construction industries.

=== Transportation ===
A road connecting Tver with Vesyegonsk via Bezhetsk runs through Rameshki, where another road branches off north to Maksatikha. There are also local roads, with bus traffic originating from Rameshki.

== Culture and recreation ==
Rameshki contains six cultural heritage monuments of federal significance. They represent the ensemble of the 18th century Trinity Church and the 19th century Alexander Nevsky Church and Bell-Tower, as well as the monument to Alexey Smirnov, a military pilot and twice the Hero of the Soviet Union.
