= Aeroflot Flight 6709 =

1978 Russian aviation accident

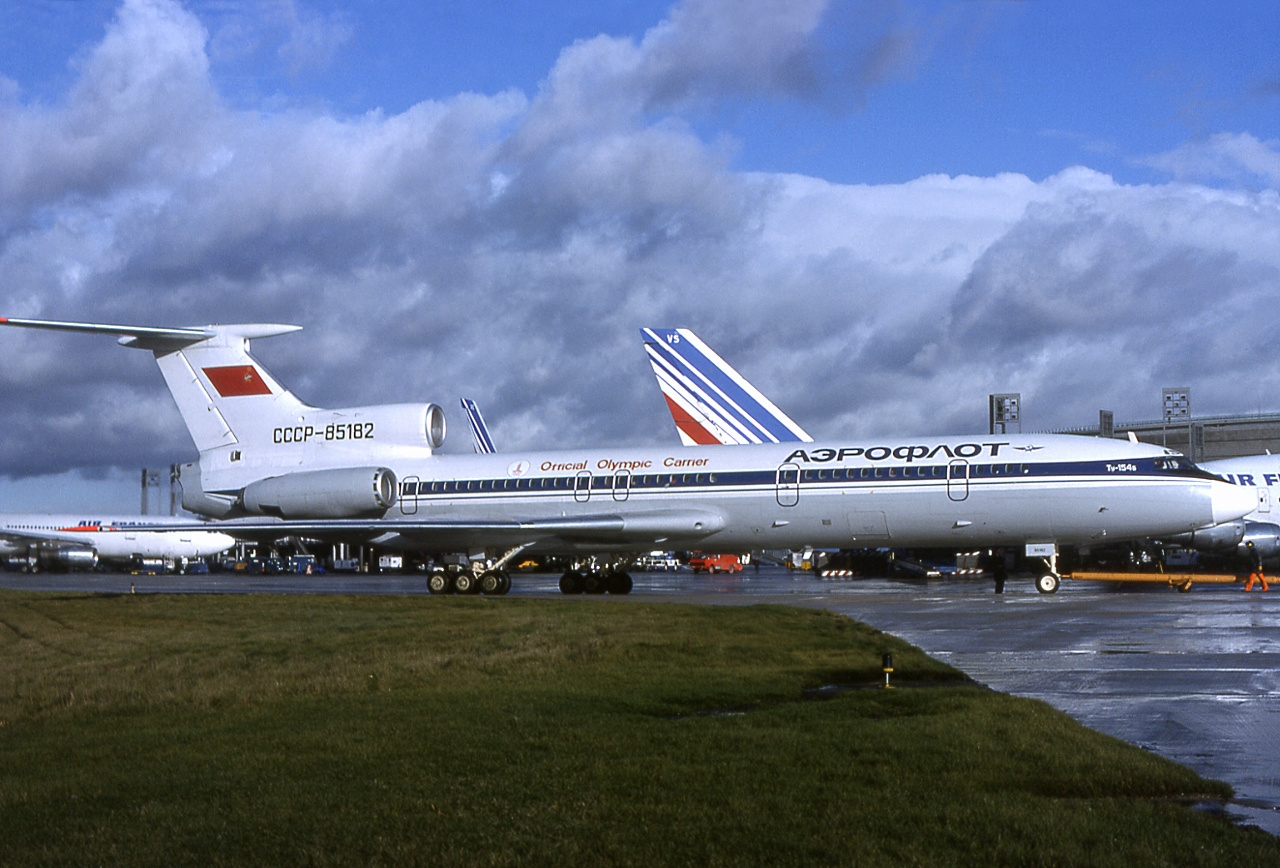
- An Aeroflot Tu-154, similar to the one involved

Accident
- Date: 19 May 1978
- Summary: Triple engine failure due to fuel starvation
- Site: Near Maksatikha, Russian SFSR, Soviet Union; 57.7766°N 35.9692°E

Aircraft
- Aircraft type: Tupolev Tu-154B
- Operator: Aeroflot
- Registration: CCCP-85169
- Flight origin: Heydar Aliyev International Airport
- Destination: Pulkovo Airport
- Occupants: 134
- Passengers: 126
- Crew: 8
- Fatalities: 4
- Injuries: 27
- Survivors: 130

Aeroflot Flight 6709 was a Tupolev Tu-154B on a domestic route from Baku to Leningrad on 19 May 1978. While cruising, fuel starvation affected the flow of fuel to the aircraft's three Kuznetsov NK-8 engines, causing the engines to stop.

== Accident details ==
Aeroflot Flight 6709 took off from Bina International Airport at 10:30 a.m. MSK. It was bound for Pulkovo Airport in Leningrad, a distance of 2,550 kilometres (1,580 mi). Roughly two hours into the flight, the engines lost power. Some sources state that this was due to an accidental shutoff of fuel pumping to the aircraft's sump tank by the flight engineer, though the accuracy of this claim is uncertain. The crash and resulting fire caused 4 fatalities and 27 injuries.
