= Lesnoy, Republic of Buryatia =

Lesnoy Лесной
- Settlement
- Location within Republic of Buryatia Location within Russia
- Coordinates: 51°43′N 107°53′E
- Country: Russia
- Region: Republic of Buryatia
- District: Tarbagataysky District
- Time zone: UTC+8:00

Lesnoy (Russian: Лесной) is a rural locality (a settlement) in Tarbagataysky District, Republic of Buryatia, Russia. The population was 6 as of 2010. There is 1 street.

== Geography ==
Lesnoy is located 60 km northeast of Tarbagatay (the district's administrative centre) by road. Nikolayevsky is the nearest rural locality.
