= Lesnoy, Barnaul, Altai Krai =

Lesnoy Лесной
- Settlement
- Location within Altai Krai Location within Russia
- Coordinates: 53°15′N 83°28′E
- Country: Russia
- Region: Altai Krai
- District: Barnaul
- Time zone: UTC+7:00

Lesnoy (Russian: Лесной) is a rural locality (a settlement) in Barnaul, Altai Krai, Russia. The population was 1,639 as of 2013. There are 53 streets.
