= Lesnoye, Biysky District, Altai Krai =

Lesnoye Лесное
- Selo
- Location within Altai Krai Location within Russia
- Coordinates: 52°28′N 85°15′E
- Country: Russia
- Region: Altai Krai
- District: Biysky District
- Time zone: UTC+7:00

Lesnoye (Russian: Лесное) is a rural locality (a selo) and the administrative center of Lesnoy Selsoviet, Biysky District, Altai Krai, Russia. The population was 2,008 as of 2013. There are 25 streets.

== Geography ==
Lesnoye is located 10 km south of Biysk (the district's administrative centre) by road. Zarechny is the nearest rural locality.
