= Maksatikha =

Maksatikha Максатиха
- Work settlement
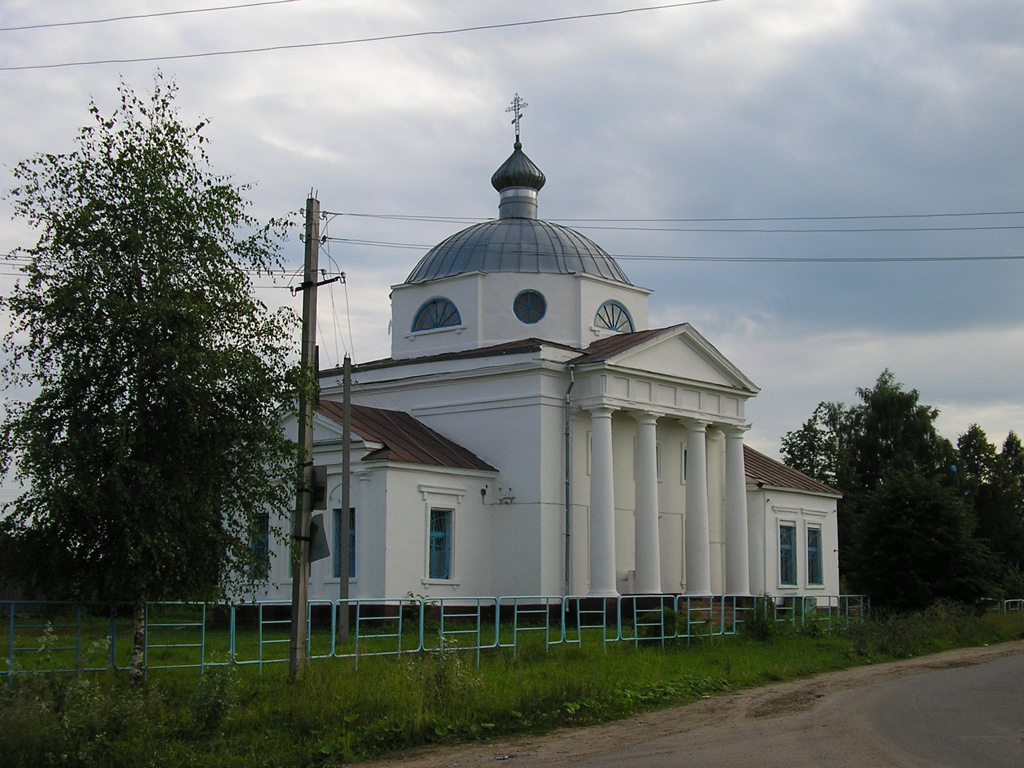
- The All Saints Church

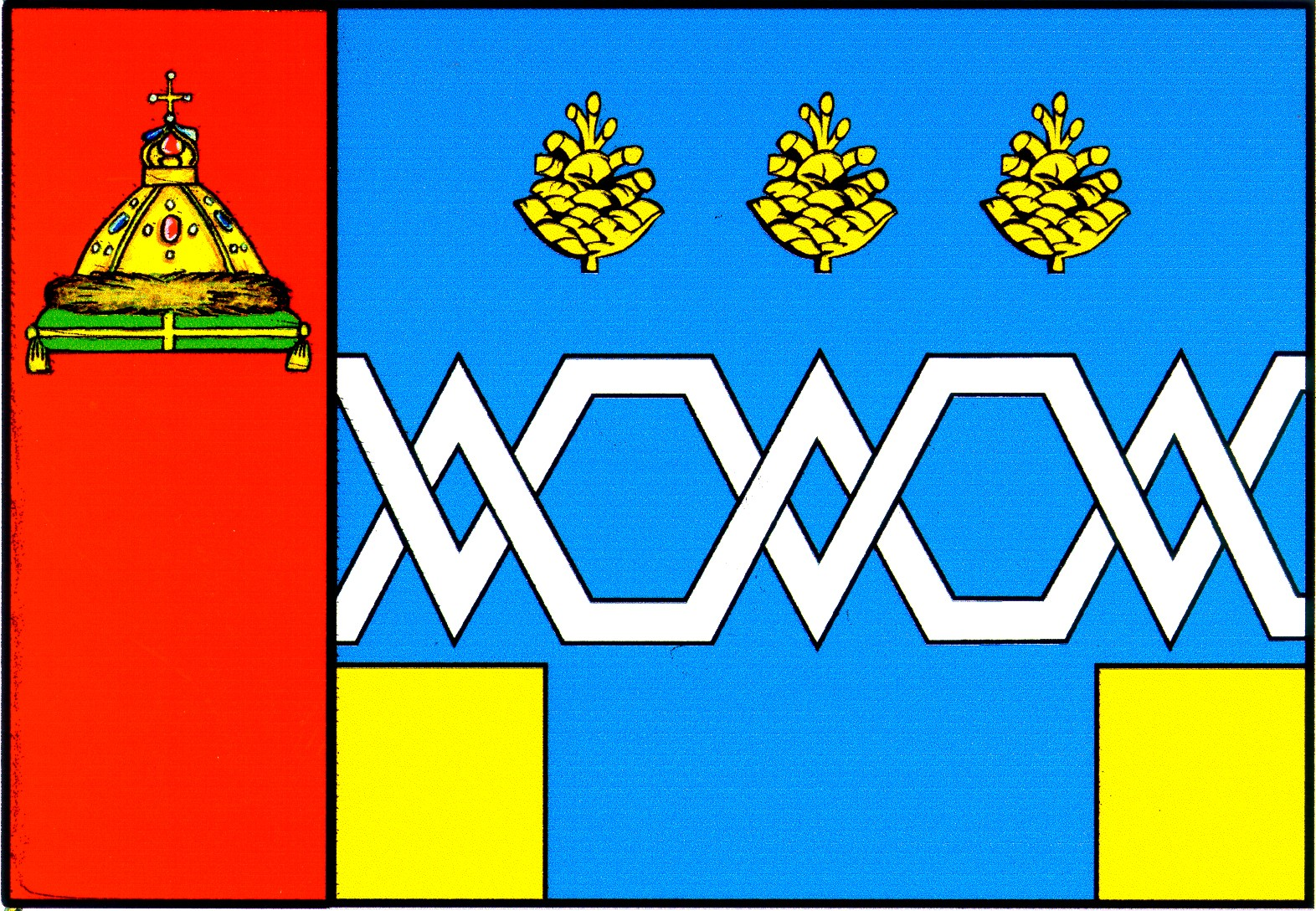
- Flag
- Interactive map of Maksatikha
- Location of Maksatikha Maksatikha (Tver Oblast)
- Coordinates: 57°47′48″N 35°53′04″E
- Country: Russia
- Federal subject: Tver Oblast
- Administrative district: Maksatikhinsky District
- First mentioned: 1545
- Urban-type settlement status since: 1928

Population (2010 Census)
  - Total: 8,744
  - Estimate (2021): 7,620 (−12.9%)

Administrative status
  - Capital of: Maksatikhinsky District

Municipal status
  - Municipal district: Maksatikhinsky Municipal District
  - Urban settlement: Maksatikhinskoye Urban Settlement
  - Capital of: Maksatikhinsky Municipal District, Maksatikhinskoye Urban Settlement
- Time zone: UTC+3 (MSK)
- Postal code: 171900
- Dialing code: +7 48253
- OKTMO ID: 28640151051

Maksatikha (Russian: Макса́тиха) is an urban-type settlement and the administrative center of Maksatikhinsky District of Tver Oblast, Russia, with a population of 8,744 (2010 census); 9,753 (2002 census); 10,217 (1989 Soviet census). It is located on the left bank of the Mologa River close to the mouth of the Volchina River.

== History ==
Maksatikha was first mentioned in 1545. In the course of the administrative reform carried out in 1708 by Peter the Great, it was included into Ingermanland Governorate (known since 1710 as Saint Petersburg Governorate), but in 1727 it was transferred to Moscow Governorate. In 1775, Tver Viceroyalty was formed, and Maksatikha was transferred to Tver Viceroyalty. In 1796, Tver Viceroyalty was transformed into Tver Governorate. Maksatikha belonged to Bezhetsky Uyezd.

Since 1924, Maksatikha was the center of Maksatikha Volost of Bezhetsky Uyezd of Tver Governorate, and in 1928, it was granted urban-type settlement status.

On July 12, 1929 the governorates and uyezds were abolished. Maksatikhinsky District, with the administrative center in Maksatikha, was established within Bezhetsk Okrug of Moscow Oblast. On July 23, 1930, the okrugs were abolished, and the districts were directly subordinated to the oblast. On January 29, 1935 Kalinin Oblast was established, and Maksatikhinsky District was transferred to Kalinin Oblast.

On July 9, 1937 Maksatikhinsky District was included into Karelian National Okrug, which was established as a Tver Karelians autonomy. On February 7, 1939 the okrug was abolished. In 1990, Kalinin Oblast was renamed Tver Oblast.

== Economy ==
=== Industry ===
There are enterprises of timber and food industry in Maksatikha.

=== Transportation ===
Maksatikha railway station is located on the railway connecting Rybinsk and Bologoye via Bezhetsk.

Maksatikha is connected by roads with Tver via Rameshki, with Bezhetsk, with Vyshny Volochyok, and with Lesnoye. There are also local roads with bus traffic originating from Maksatikha.

== Culture and recreation ==
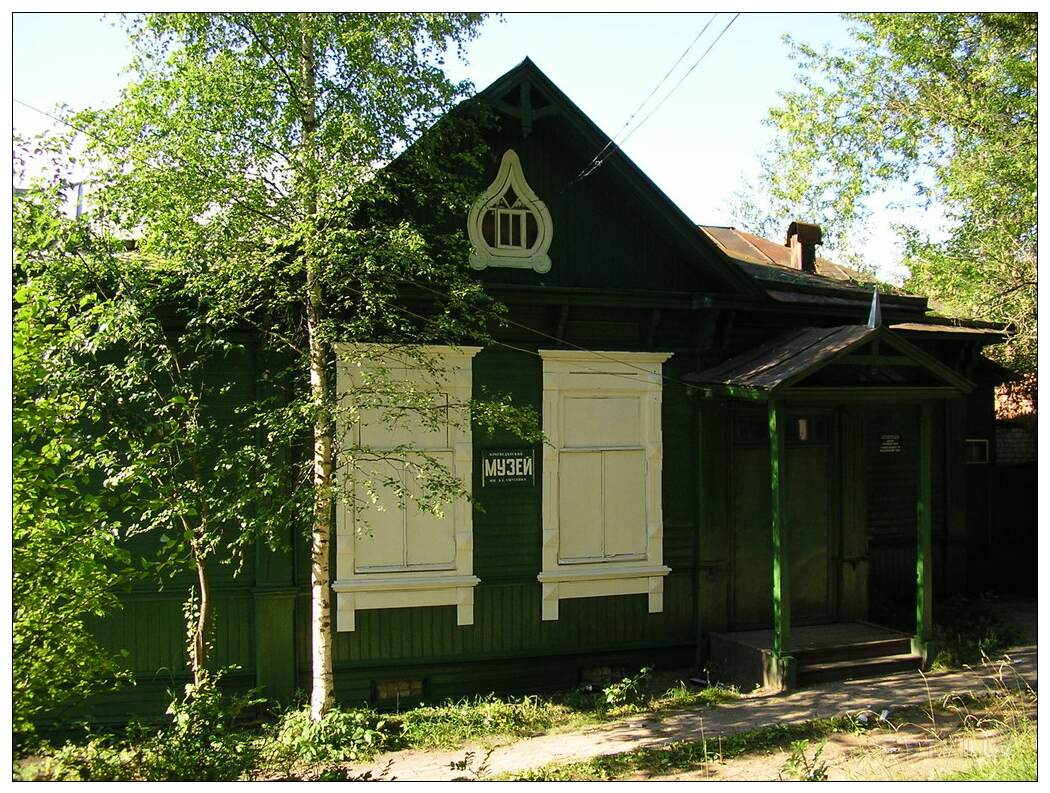
Local museum in Maksatikha.

Maksatikha contains one object classified as cultural and historical heritage of local significance, which is the Nativity Church.

== See also ==
- Aeroflot Flight 6709
