= Lesnoy, Amur Oblast =

Lesnoy Лесной
- Settlement
- Location within Amur Oblast Location within Russia
- Coordinates: 53°52′N 123°49′E
- Country: Russia
- Region: Amur Oblast
- District: Skovorodinsky District
- Time zone: UTC+9:00

Lesnoy (Russian: Лесной) is a rural locality (posyolok), an administrative unit of Gorod Svorodino urban municipality of Skovorodinsky District, Amur Oblast, Russia. The population was 332 as of 2018. There are 8 streets.

== Geography ==
Lesnoy is located on the Bolshoy Never River, 18 km southwest of Skovorodino (the district's administrative centre) by road. Skovorodino is the nearest rural locality.
