= Lesnoye, Vologda Oblast =

Lesnoye Лесное
- Settlement
- Location within Vologda Oblast Location within Russia
- Coordinates: 59°06′N 37°52′E
- Country: Russia
- Region: Vologda Oblast
- District: Cherepovetsky District
- Time zone: UTC+3:00

Lesnoye (Russian: Лесное) is a rural locality (a settlement) in Yugskoye Rural Settlement, Cherepovetsky District, Vologda Oblast, Russia. The population was 78 as of 2002.

== Geography ==
Lesnoye is located 5 km (3.1 mi) southwest of Cherepovets (the district's administrative centre) by road. Cherepovets is the nearest rural locality.
