= Vitold Byalynitsky-Birulya =

Soviet landscape painter (1872–1957)

- Витольд Бялыницкий-Бируля
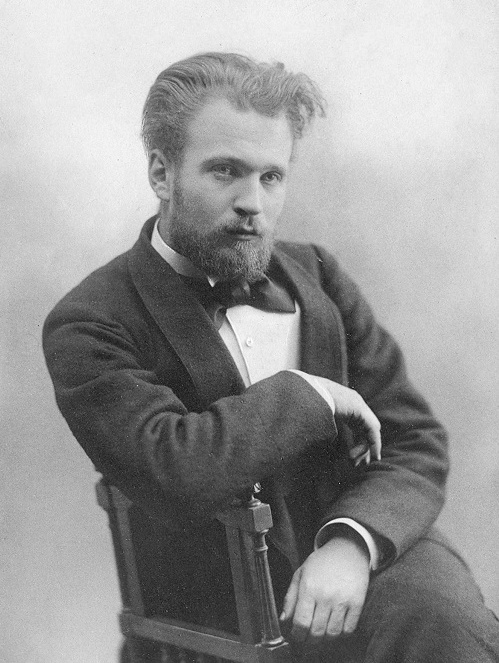
- Byalynitsky-Birulya in 1898
- Born: 31 January 1872; Krynki, Mogilev region, Russian Empire
- Died: 18 June 1957 (aged 85); Moscow, Russian SFSR, Soviet Union
- Resting place: Novodevichy Cemetery
- Movement: Impressionism
- Awards: Order of the Red Banner of Labour; People's Artist of the RSFSR; People's Artist of Belarus

Vitold Kaetanovich Byalynitsky-Birulya (Belarusian: Вітольд Каэтанавіч Бялыніцкі-Біруля, Russian: Вито́льд Каэта́нович Бялыни́цкий-Бируля́; 12 February [O.S. 31 January] 1872 in Krynki, (now Byalynichy district), Mogilev region, Belarus – 18 June 1957 in Moscow) was a Russian, Soviet and Belarusian landscape painter.

== Biography ==
Byalynitsky-Birulya originates from a noble Belarusian family, whose representatives are mentioned in the 16th century in connection with the Livonian War. His father served in the Dnieper shipping company allowing Byalynitsky-Birulya to travel with him on Belarusian rivers. His education began in Kyiv with cadet corps, after which he went to the famous Kiev drawing school Murashki, which was associated with the names of such artists as Repin, Vrubel, Serov and Malevich. At the age of 17, Byalynitsky-Birulya entered the Moscow School of Painting, Sculpture and Architecture. He got acquainted with Isaac Levitan, in whose studio he began to work.

In 1947, Byalynitsky-Birulya was elected into the USSR Academy of Arts. and became an Honorary Academician of the Academy of Sciences of Soviet Belarus.

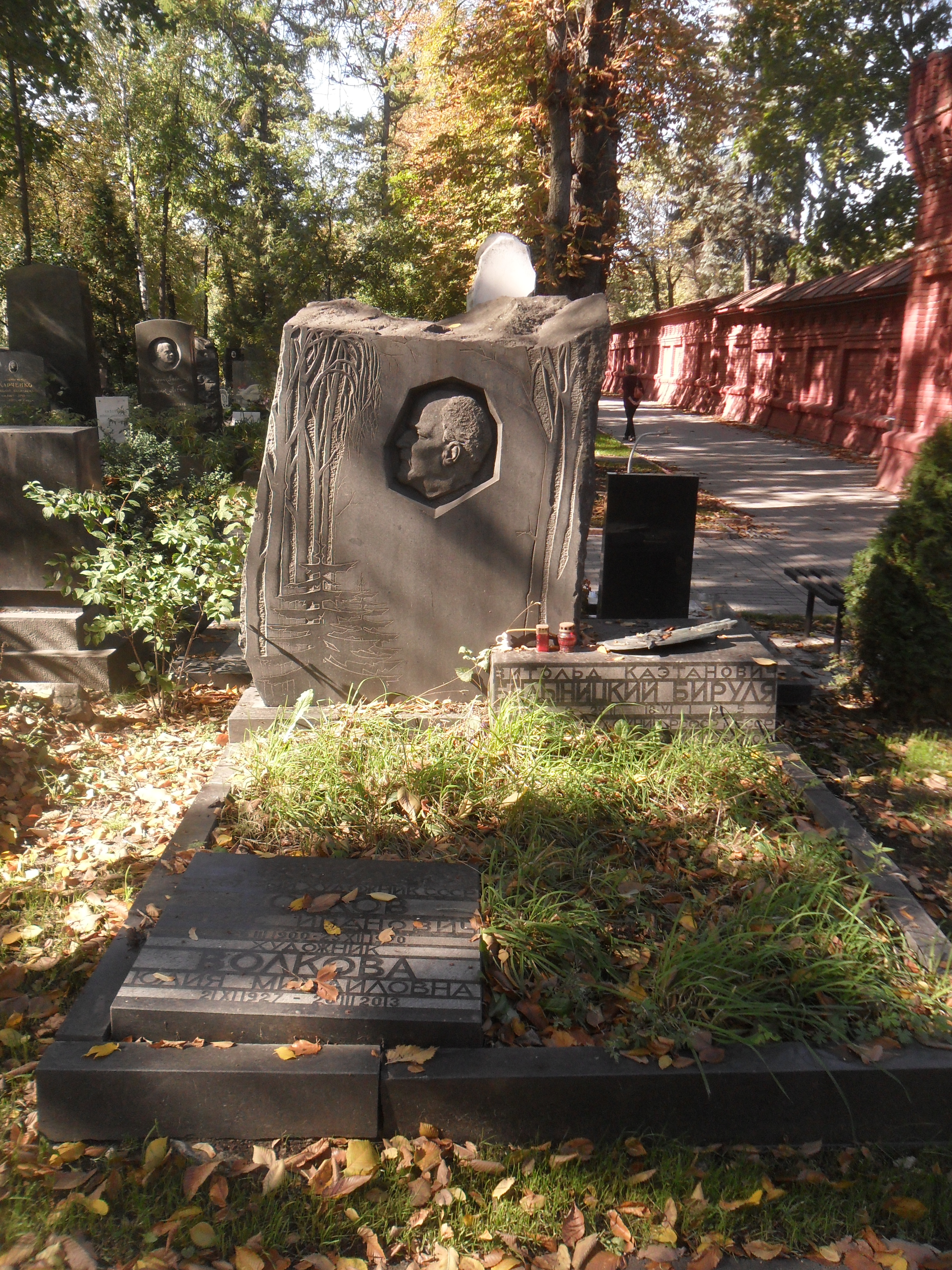
His grave at Novodevichy Cemetery in Moscow.

He died on June 18, 1957, in Moscow, at the age of 85; he was buried at Novodevichy Cemetery.

Byalynitsky-Birulya has left a rich legacy - approximately 2000 paintings and sketches housed in various museums and private collections around the world. More than 450 of his paintings are kept in Belarus - in the National Art Museum of the Republic of Belarus, the Museum of Belynitsky-Birula in Mogilev, Art Museum named after Bialynichy-Birula in Byalynichy and others. The memory of Byalynitsky-Birulya is honored in the names of schools and streets in Mogilev and Byalynichy. A memorial sign has been erected in his honor at the Drut River on the site of his birth place, former Krynki manor.

According to Russian libertarian Mikhail Svetov, Byalynitsky-Birulya is his distant relative.
