= Byalynichy =

Town in Mogilev Region, Belarus

Byalynichy Бялынічы (Belarusian)
- Town
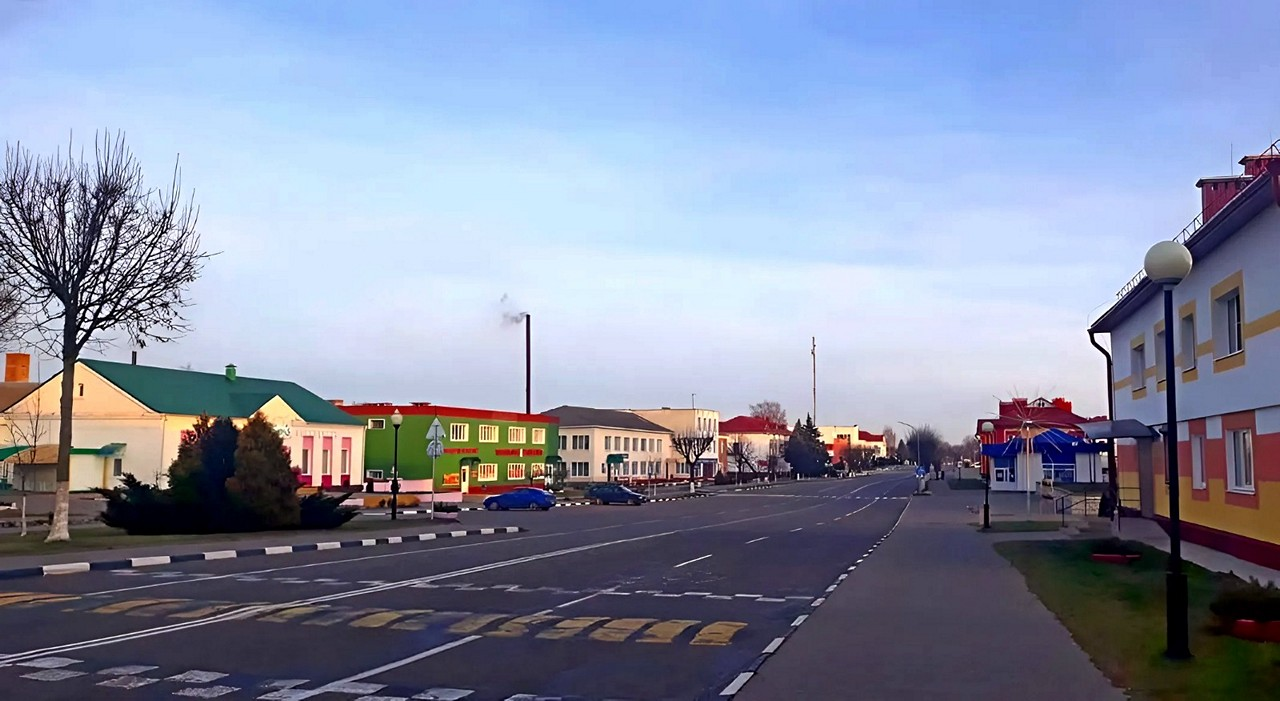

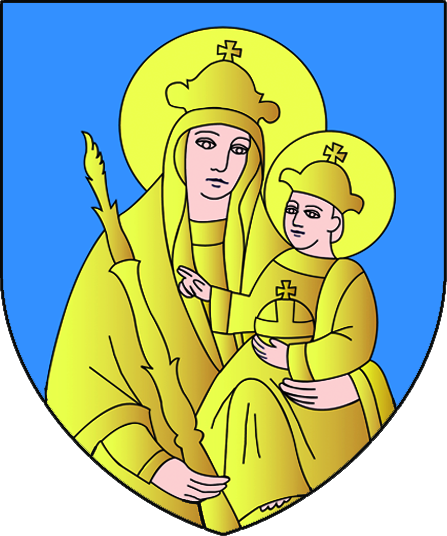
- Flag Coat of arms

- Location within Belarus
- Coordinates: 53°59′44″N 29°42′34″E
- Country: Belarus
- Region: Mogilev Region
- District: Byalynichy District

Population (2025)
  - Total: 9,553
- Time zone: UTC+3 (MSK)

Byalynichy (Belarusian: Бялы́нічы, romanized: Bialyničy; Russian: Белы́ничи, romanized: Belynichi; Polish: Białynicze; Yiddish: בעליניטש) is a town in Mogilev Region, Belarus. It is located 45 kilometres (28 mi) west-northwest of Mogilev, and serves as the administrative center of Byalynichy District. As of 2025, it has a population of 9,553.

== History ==
=== World War II ===
In the Grand Duchy of Lithuania, Byalynichy belonged to Vitebsk Voivodeship. In 1772, as a result of the First Partition of Poland, the town became part of the Russian Empire, where it belonged to Mogilev Governorate.

Around 780 Jews lived in Byalynichy at the eve of World War II. They composed about 24 percent of the total population. The Jews were mainly traders.

Byalynichy was under German military occupation from 6 July 1941 until 29 June 1944. 150 Jewish men were killed in September 1941. The remaining Jews, together with Jewish families from nearby settlements in the district, were resettled in a ghetto in the town.

On 12 December 1941, the Germans liquidated the ghetto, with the German Security Police and local Belarusian police gathering the remaining 600 Jews. Those Jews, who were mainly women, children and the elderly, were escorted to the woods and shot in pits that were dug in advance.

The Red Army liberated Byalynichy on 29 June 1944.

=== Later history ===
In 2016, Byalynichy received the status of town of district subordination (previously it was an urban-type settlement).

== Sources ==
- Megargee, Geoffrey P.; Dean, Martin (2012). The United States Holocaust Memorial Museum Encyclopedia of Camps and Ghettos 1933–1945. Volume II. Indiana University Press, United States Holocaust Memorial Museum. pp. 1645–1646. ISBN 978-0-253-35599-7.
