= Lesnoy, Republic of Bashkortostan =

Lesnoy Лесной
- Village
- Location within Bashkortostan Location within Russia
- Coordinates: 54°43′N 55°43′E
- Country: Russia
- Region: Bashkortostan
- District: Ufimsky District
- Time zone: UTC+5:00

Lesnoy (Russian: Лесной) is a rural locality (a village) in Milovsky Selsoviet, Ufimsky District, Bashkortostan, Russia. The population was 15 as of 2010. There are 4 streets.

== Geography ==
Lesnoy is located 28 km west of Ufa (the district's administrative centre) by road. Sergeyevka is the nearest rural locality.
