= Lesnoy, Borovikhinsky Selsoviet, Pervomaysky District, Altai Krai =

Lesnoy Лесной
- Settlement
- Location within Altai Krai Location within Russia
- Coordinates: 53°31′N 83°48′E
- Country: Russia
- Region: Altai Krai
- District: Pervomaysky District
- Time zone: UTC+7:00

Lesnoy (Russian: Лесной) is a rural locality (a settlement) in Borovikhinsky Selsoviet, Pervomaysky District, Altai Krai, Russia. The population was 35 as of 2013.

== Geography ==
Lesnoy is located 16 km from Novoaltaysk, 20 km from Barnaul.
