= Lesnoy, Bobrovsky Selsoviet, Pervomaysky District, Altai Krai =

Lesnoy Лесной
- Settlement
- Location within Altai Krai Location within Russia
- Coordinates: 53°14′N 83°58′E
- Country: Russia
- Region: Altai Krai
- District: Pervomaysky District
- Time zone: UTC+7:00

Lesnoy (Russian: Лесной) is a rural locality (a settlement) in Bobrovsky Selsoviet, Pervomaysky District, Altai Krai, Russia. The population was 808 as of 2013. There are 11 streets.

== Geography ==
Lesnoy is located 21 km from Novoaltaysk, 50 km from Barnaul.
