= Tayozhny, Perm Krai =

Tayozhny Таёжный
- Settlement
- Location within Perm Krai Location within Russia
- Coordinates: 57°42′N 55°47′E
- Country: Russia
- Region: Perm Krai
- District: Permsky District
- Time zone: UTC+5:00

Tayozhny (Russian: Таёжный) is a rural locality (a settlement) in Yugo-Kamskoye Rural Settlement, Permsky District, Perm Krai, Russia. The population was 86 as of 2010. There are five streets.

== Geography ==
Tayozhny is located 58 km southwest of Perm (the district's administrative centre) by road. Verkh-Yug is the nearest rural locality.
