= Lesnoye, Bryansky District, Bryansk Oblast =

Lesnoye Лесное
- Selo
- Location within Bryansk Oblast Location within Russia
- Coordinates: 53°21′N 34°35′E
- Country: Russia
- Region: Bryansk Oblast
- District: Bryansky District
- Time zone: UTC+3:00

Lesnoye (Russian: Лесное) is a rural locality (a village) in Bryansky District, Bryansk Oblast, Russia. The population was 62 as of 2010. There is 1 street.

== Geography ==
Lesnoye is located 64 km east of Glinishchevo (the district's administrative centre) by road. Kozyolkino is the nearest rural locality.
