= Lesnoye, Republic of Bashkortostan =

Lesnoye Лесное
- Village
- Location within Bashkortostan Location within Russia
- Coordinates: 53°16′N 56°10′E
- Country: Russia
- Region: Bashkortostan
- District: Ishimbaysky District
- Time zone: UTC+5:00

Lesnoye (Russian: Лесное) is a rural locality (a village) in Skvorchikhinsky Selsoviet, Ishimbaysky District, Bashkortostan, Russia. The population was 11 as of 2010. There is 1 street.

== Geography ==
Lesnoye is located 25 km southeast of Ishimbay (the district's administrative centre) by road. Torgaska is the nearest rural locality.
