= Lesnoy, Rebrikhinsky District, Altai Krai =

Lesnoy Лесной
- Settlement
- Location within Altai Krai Location within Russia
- Coordinates: 53°01′N 82°14′E
- Country: Russia
- Region: Altai Krai
- District: Rebrikhinsky District
- Time zone: UTC+7:00

Lesnoy (Russian: Лесной) is a rural locality (a settlement) in Pavnovsky Selsoviet, Rebrikhinsky District, Altai Krai, Russia. The population was 36 as of 2013. There is 1 street.

== Geography ==
Lesnoy is located 11 km southwest of Rebrikha (the district's administrative centre) by road. Rebrikha is the nearest rural locality.
