= Yelkino =

Yelkino Елькино
- Village
- Location within Vladimir Oblast Location within Russia
- Coordinates: 56°23′N 38°49′E
- Country: Russia
- Region: Vladimir Oblast
- District: Alexandrovsky District
- Time zone: UTC+3:00

Yelkino (Russian: Елькино) is a rural locality (a village) in Andreyevskoye Rural Settlement, Alexandrovsky District, Vladimir Oblast, Russia. The population was 420 as of 2010. There are 10 streets.

== Geography ==
Yelkino is located 6 km east of Alexandrov (the district's administrative centre) by road. Mayak is the nearest rural locality.
