= Tayozhny, Republic of Buryatia =

Tayozhny Таёжный
- Settlement
- Location within Republic of Buryatia Location within Russia
- Coordinates: 51°12′N 105°42′E
- Country: Russia
- Region: Republic of Buryatia
- District: Selenginsky District
- Time zone: UTC+8:00

Tayozhny (Russian: Таёжный) is a rural locality (a settlement) in Selenginsky District, Republic of Buryatia, Russia. The population was 150 as of 2010. There are 6 streets.

== Geography ==
Tayozhny is located 95 km west of Gusinoozyorsk (the district's administrative centre) by road.
