= Lesnoye, Astrakhan Oblast =

Lesnoye Лесное
- Selo
- Location within Astrakhan Oblast Location within Russia
- Coordinates: 45°46′N 47°31′E
- Country: Russia
- Region: Astrakhan Oblast
- District: Limansky District
- Time zone: UTC+4:00

Lesnoye (Russian: Лесное) is a rural locality (a selo) in Limansky District, Astrakhan Oblast, Russia. The population was 2,115 as of 2010. There are 12 streets.

== Geography ==
Lesnoye is located 25 km east of Liman (the district's administrative centre) by road. Olya is the nearest rural locality.
