= Lesnoye, Nemetsky natsionalny District, Altai Krai =

Lesnoye Лесное
- Selo
- Location within Altai Krai Location within Russia
- Coordinates: 53°21′N 79°08′E
- Country: Russia
- Region: Altai Krai
- District: Nemetsky National District
- Time zone: UTC+7:00

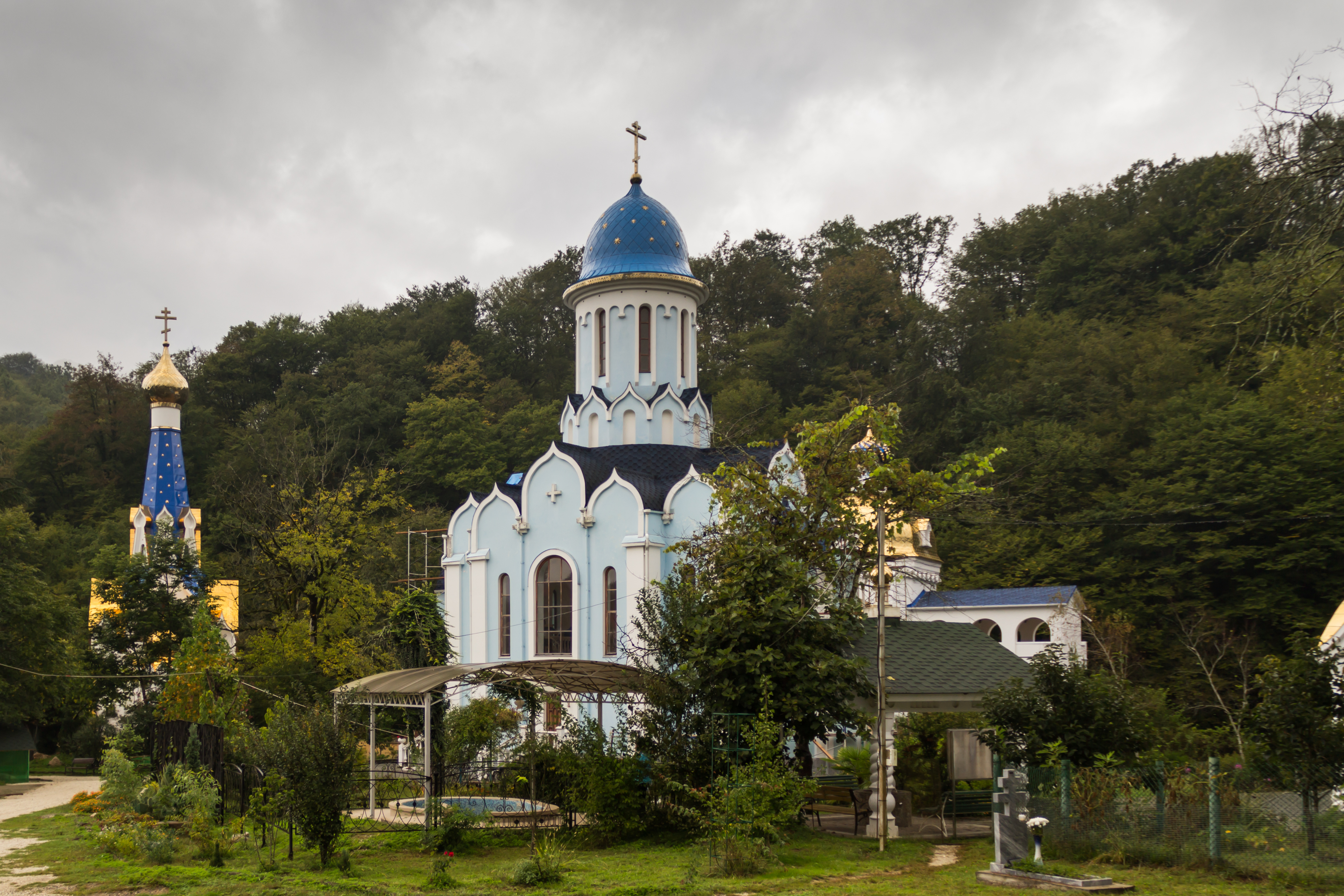
Lesnoye

Lesnoye (Russian: Лесное) is a rural locality (a selo) in Nemetsky National District, Altai Krai, Russia. The population was 125 as of 2013.

== Geography ==
Lesnoye is located 22 km northeast of Galbshtadt (the district's administrative centre) by road. Alexandrovka is the nearest rural locality.
