= Lesnoye, Burlinsky District, Altai Krai =

Lesnoye Лесное
- Selo
- Location within Altai Krai Location within Russia
- Coordinates: 53°31′N 78°42′E
- Country: Russia
- Region: Altai Krai
- District: Burlinsky District
- Time zone: UTC+7:00

Lesnoye (Russian: Лесное) is a rural locality (a selo) and the administrative center of Rozhkovsky Selsoviet, Burlinsky District, Altai Krai, Russia. The population was 594 as of 2013. It was founded in 1939. There are 6 streets.

== Geography ==
Lesnoye is located 50 km northeast of Burla (the district's administrative centre) by road. Ustyanka is the nearest rural locality.
