= Kalinin Nuclear Power Plant =

Nuclear power plant

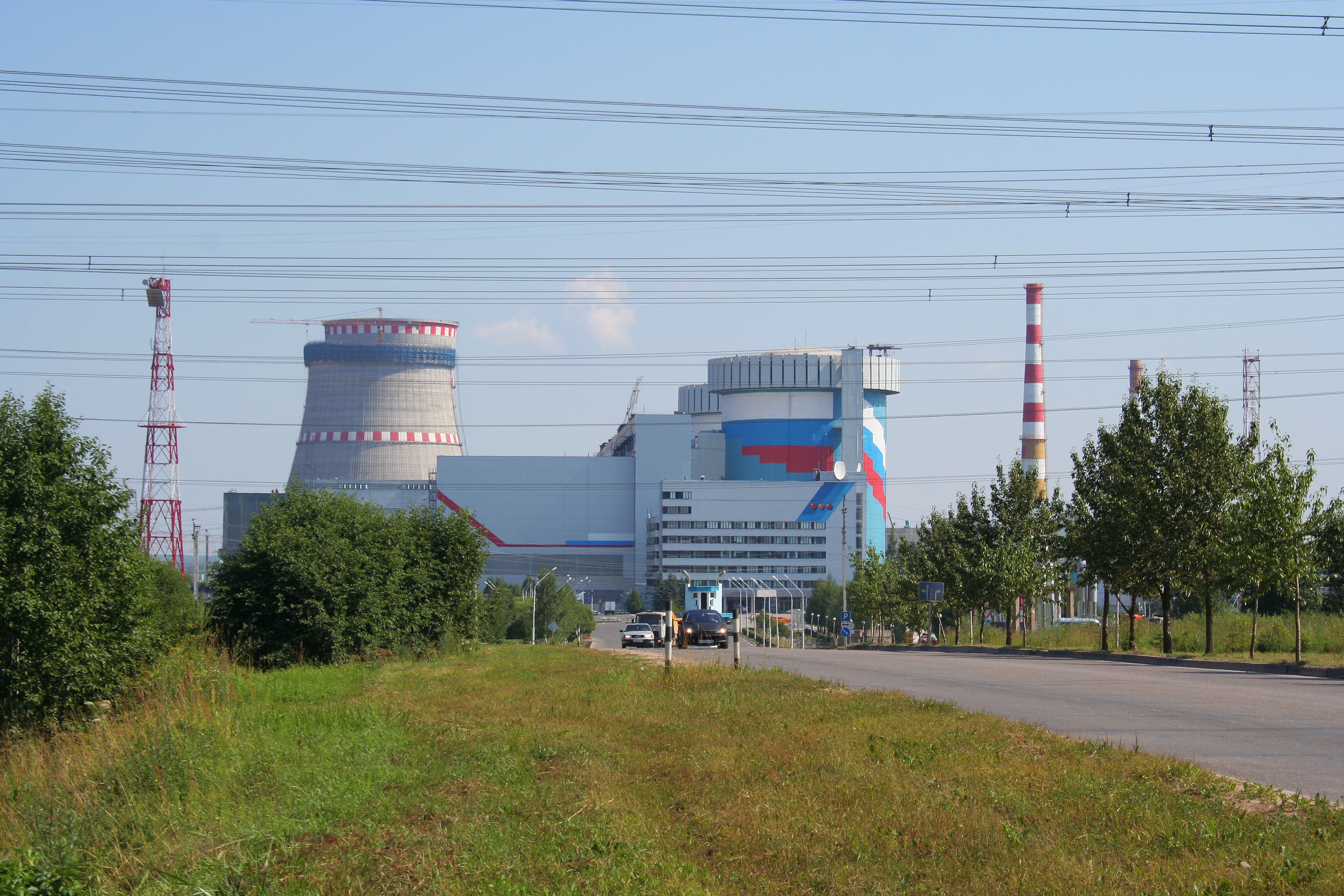
- Official name: Калининская АЭС
- Country: Russia
- Coordinates: 57°54′20″N 35°03′37″E
- Status: Operational
- Construction began: 1 February 1977
- Commission date: 12 June 1985
- Operator: Rosenergoatom

Nuclear power station
- Reactor type: VVER
- Cooling towers: 4

Power generation
- Units operational: 4 x 1000 MW
- Nameplate capacity: 4,000 MW
- Capacity factor: 57.4%
- Annual net output: 20,106 GW·h

External links
- Website: www.rosenergoatom.ru/stations_projects/sayt-kalininskoy-aes/
- Commons: Related media on Commons

The Kalinin Nuclear Power Station (Russian: Калининская АЭС []) is located about 200 kilometres (120 mi) north west of Moscow, in Tver Oblast near the town of Udomlya. Owner and operator of the plant is the state enterprise Rosenergoatom. Kalinin Nuclear Power Station supplies the majority of electricity in the Tver Oblast and additionally serves Moscow, Saint Petersburg, and Vladimir. In 2005 the nuclear power station fed 17.3 TWh (62,000 TJ) into the grid. The station's four 150 metres (490 ft) tall cooling towers are local landmarks. They were manufactured in 96 concrete sections each.

By March 2009 the containment structure of the new Kalinin Unit 4 reactor was nearly complete. The reactor achieved its first criticality on 8 November 2011.

== Reactor data ==
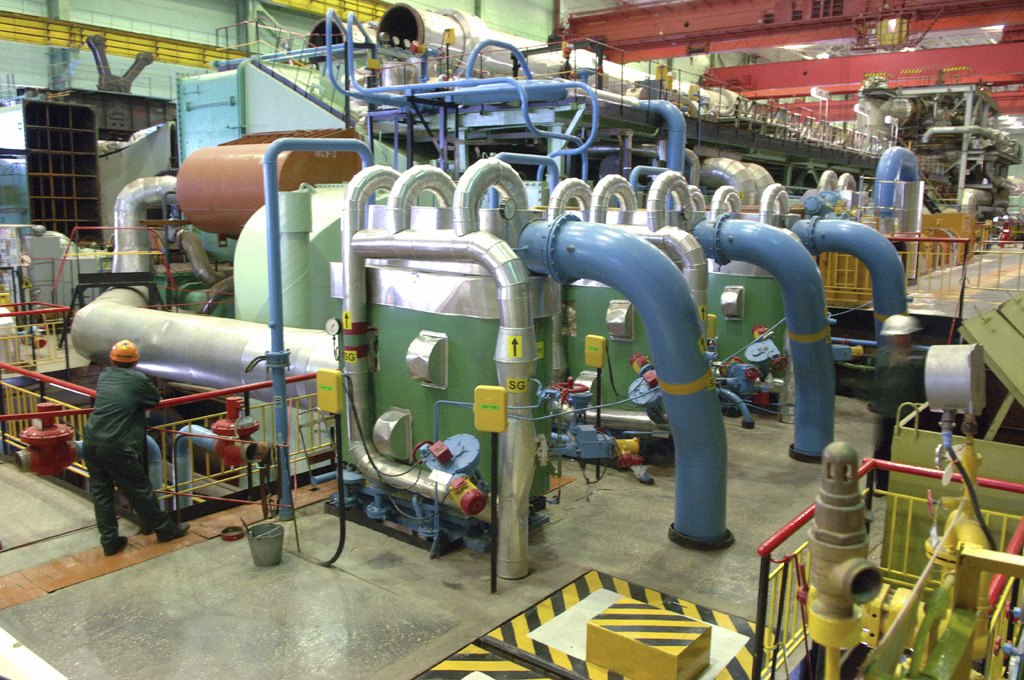
No.2 generating unit's turbine room

The Kalinin Nuclear Power Plant has four units that all produce 950 MW, it is a fine sized power station. It is a VVER type reactor and is in Russia.

Unit	Reactor type	Net capacity	Gross capacity	Construction started	Electricity Grid	Commercial Operation	Shutdown
Kalinin – 1	VVER-1000/338	950 MW	1,000 MW	1977/02/01	1984/05/09	1985/06/12	2029
Kalinin – 2	VVER-1000/338	950 MW	1,000 MW	1982/02/01	1986/12/03	1987/03/03	2038
Kalinin – 3	VVER-1000/320	950 MW	1,000 MW	1985/10/01	2004/12/16	2005/11/08	2034
Kalinin – 4	VVER-1000/320	950 MW	1,000 MW	1986/08/01	2011/11/24	2012/12/25	2041

== See also ==
- Nuclear power in Russia
- Russian nuclear plant map
