= Lesnoye, Tver Oblast =

Lesnoye Лесное
- Selo
- Interactive map of Lesnoye
- Location of Lesnoye Lesnoye (Tver Oblast)
- Coordinates: 58°16′58″N 35°31′16″E
- Country: Russia
- Federal subject: Tver Oblast
- Administrative district: Lesnoy District
- SettlementSelsoviet: Lesnoye Settlement

Population (2010 Census)
  - Total: 1,666
  - Estimate (2010): 1,666 (0%)

Administrative status
  - Capital of: Lesnoy District, Lesnoye Settlement

Municipal status
  - Municipal district: Lesnoy Municipal District
  - Rural settlement: Lesnoye Rural Settlement
  - Capital of: Lesnoy Municipal District, Lesnoye Rural Settlement
- Time zone: UTC+3 (MSK)
- Postal code: 171890
- OKTMO ID: 28636412101

Lesnoye (Russian: Лесно́е) is a rural locality (a selo) and the administrative center of Lesnoy District of Tver Oblast, Russia. Population: 1,666 (2010 census); 1,949 (2002 census); 1,769 (1989 Soviet census).

== History ==
Lesnoye is first mentioned as Smerdyn in a birch bark manuscript found in Veliky Novgorod. The manuscript dates from the end of the 14th century or the beginning of the 15th century and is believed to refer to the same Smerdyn which later became Lesnoye. At the time, it belonged to the Novgorod Republic. In the 15th century, together with Novgorod, the area was annexed by the Grand Duchy of Moscow. It belonged to Bezhetsk Pyatina, one of the five pyatinas into which Novgorod lands were divided.

In the course of the administrative reform carried out in 1708 by Peter the Great, Smerdyn was included into Ingermanland Governorate (known since 1710 as Saint Petersburg Governorate), but in 1727 it was transferred to Moscow Governorate. In 1775, Tver Viceroyalty was formed from the lands which previously belonged to Moscow and Novgorod Governorates, and in 1776 Vesyegonsky Uyezd was established as a part of Tver Viceroyalty. In 1796, the viceroyalty was transformed into Tver Governorate, and Vesyegonsky Uyezd was abolished, the area was moved to Bezhetsky Uyezd. In 1803, the uyezd was re-established. Smerdyn belonged to Mikhaylovskaya Volost of Vesyegonsky Uyezd. On April 25, 1921, Vesyegonsky Uyezd was transferred to newly established Rybinsk Governorate. In 1922, Smerdyn was transferred to Vyshnevolotsky Uyezd of Tver Governorate.

On July 12, 1929 the governorates and uyezds were abolished. Mikhaylovsky District, with the administrative center in Smerdyn, was established within Bezhetsk Okrug of Moscow Oblast. On July 23, 1930, the okrugs were abolished, and the districts were directly subordinated to the oblast. On December 25, 1930 Smerdyn was renamed Lesnoye, and Mikhaylovsky District was renamed Lesnoy District. On January 29, 1935 Kalinin Oblast was established, and Lesnoy District was transferred to Kalinin Oblast. In February 1963, during the abortive administrative reform by Nikita Khrushchev, Lesnoy District was merged into Maksatikhinsky District, but on December 30, 1966 it was re-established. In 1990, Kalinin Oblast was renamed Tver Oblast.

== Economy ==
=== Industry ===
There are enterprises of timber and food industries in Lesnoye.

=== Transportation ===
Lesnoye is connected by road with Maksatikha. There are some local roads, however, there are no roads which connect Lesnoye and Novgorod Oblast.
