= Skovorodino, Amur Oblast =

Skovorodino Сковородино
- Town
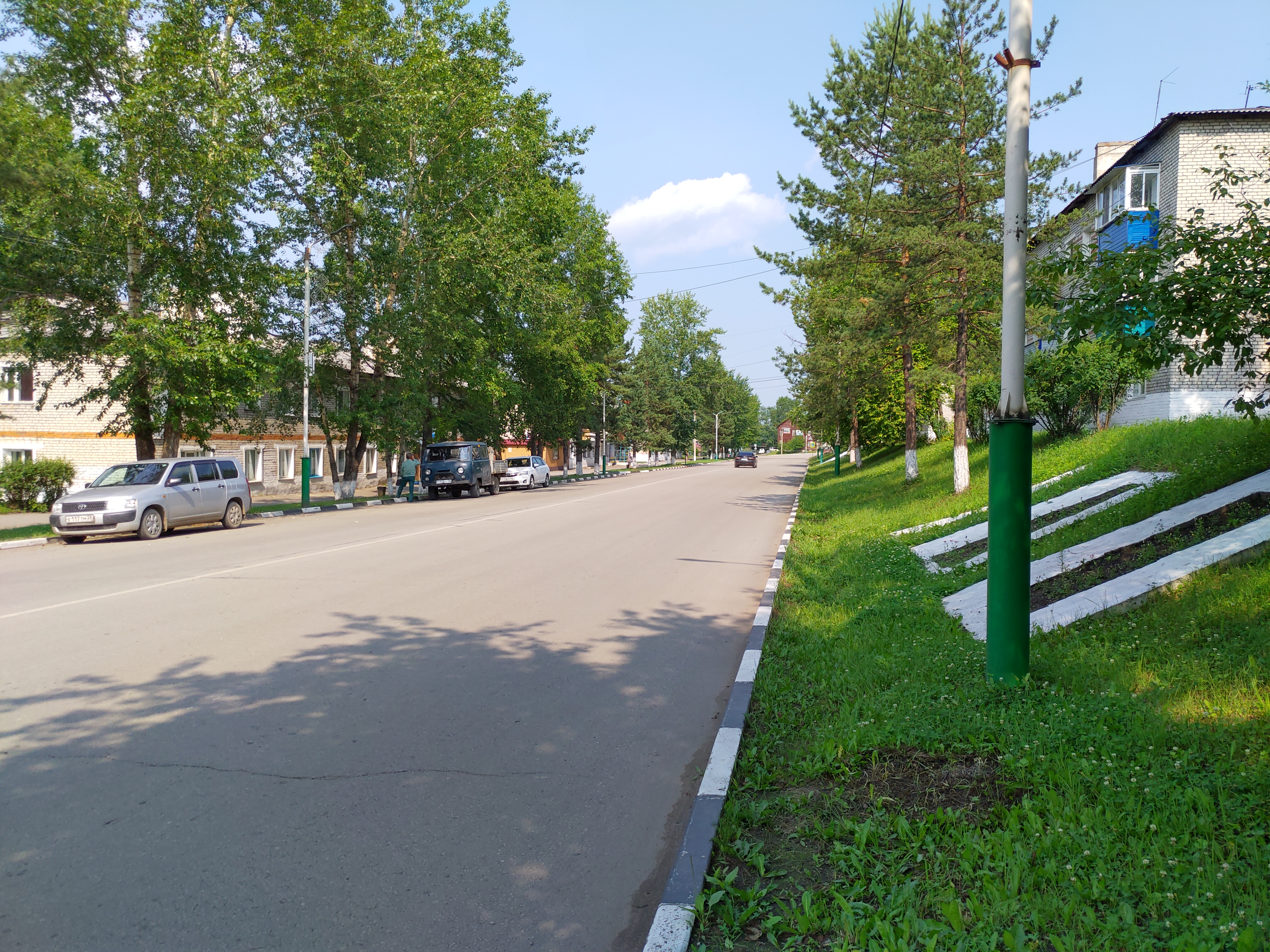

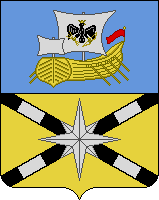
- Coat of arms
- Interactive map of Skovorodino
- Location of Skovorodino Skovorodino (Amur Oblast)
- Coordinates: 53°59′N 123°56′E
- Country: Russia
- Federal subject: Amur Oblast
- Administrative district: Skovorodinsky District
- Urban settlementSelsoviet: Skovorodino
- Founded: 1908
- Town status since: 1927

Government
  - Mayor: Tatyana Konyushikhina
- Elevation: 400 m (1,300 ft)

Population (2010 Census)
  - Total: 9,564
  - Estimate (2025): 6,328 (−33.8%)

Administrative status
  - Capital of: Skovorodinsky District, Skovorodino Urban Settlement

Municipal status
  - Municipal district: Skovorodinsky Municipal District
  - Urban settlement: Skovorodino Urban Settlement
  - Capital of: Skovorodinsky Municipal District, Skovorodino Urban Settlement
- Time zone: UTC+9 (MSK+6)
- Postal code: 676010–676015
- Dialing code: +7 41654
- OKTMO ID: 10649101001

Skovorodino (Russian: Сковородино́) is a town and the administrative center of Skovorodinsky District of Amur Oblast, Russia, located in the upper stream of the Bolshoy Never River 669 kilometers (416 mi) northwest of Blagoveshchensk, the administrative center of the oblast. Skovorodino is located 54 kilometers (34 mi) from the border with Heilongjiang, China. Population: 9,564 (2010 census); 10,566 (2002 census); 13,824 (1989 Soviet census).

== Geography ==
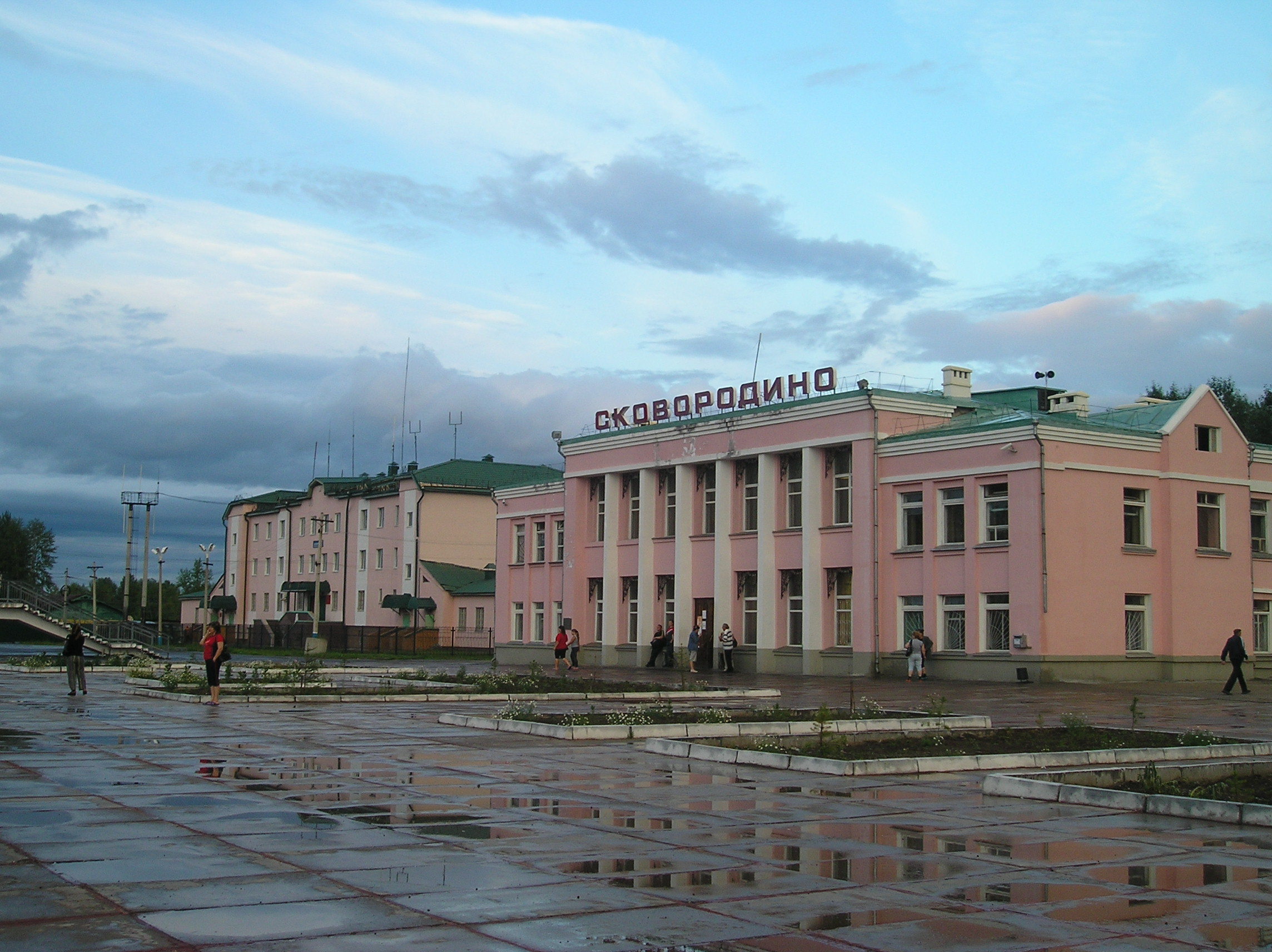
Skovorodino railway station

The nearest significant town is Tynda, about 140 kilometers (87 mi) to the north on the Baikal-Amur Mainline.

== History ==
It was founded in 1908 as the settlement of Zmeiny (Змеи́ный) during the construction of the Trans-Siberian Railway. It was then renamed Never-1 (Невер-1) after the nearby river. In 1911, it was once again renamed and became Rukhlovo (Рухлово). It was granted town status in 1927.

In 1938, it was renamed Skovorodino in honor of A. N. Skovorodin (1890–1920), chairman of a local soviet, who had been killed here during the Russian Civil War. There is a myth that it was named after a frying pan factory ordered by Stalin (Russian: сковорода, romanized: skovoroda, lit. 'frying pan'), which is not correct.

== Administrative and municipal status ==
Within the framework of administrative divisions, Skovorodino serves as the administrative center of Skovorodinsky District. As an administrative division, it is, together with the settlement of Lesnoy, incorporated within Skovorodinsky District as Skovorodino Urban Settlement. As a municipal division, this administrative unit also has urban settlement status and is a part of Skovorodinsky Municipal District.

== Economy ==
An oil pipeline is currently under construction from Tayshet north of Lake Baikal to Skovorodino; it is intended for oil to be transported from here by rail to the port of Nakhodka on the Pacific, as well as to China. This is planned as the first section of a pipeline bringing natural gas directly to the Pacific ports, managed by Transneft. It was opened on 27 December 2009 by Prime Minister Vladimir Putin.

== Climate ==
Skovorodino has a subarctic climate (Köppen climate classification Dwc). Winters are severely cold with average temperatures from −33.4 to −18.9 °C (−28.1 to −2.0 °F) in January, while summers are warm but short, with average temperatures from +11.5 to +24.9 °C (52.7 to 76.8 °F) in July. Precipitation is moderate and is much higher in summer than at other times of the year. Winters are generally dry.

Climate data for Skovorodino
Month	Jan	Feb	Mar	Apr	May	Jun	Jul	Aug	Sep	Oct	Nov	Dec	Year
Record high °C (°F)	−5.5 (22.1)	2.1 (35.8)	15.4 (59.7)	28.8 (83.8)	33.5 (92.3)	35.1 (95.2)	38.3 (100.9)	34.5 (94.1)	28.6 (83.5)	23.3 (73.9)	7.5 (45.5)	−1.9 (28.6)	38.3 (100.9)
Mean daily maximum °C (°F)	−18.7 (−1.7)	−12.1 (10.2)	−3.5 (25.7)	7.1 (44.8)	16.9 (62.4)	23.9 (75.0)	25.4 (77.7)	23.0 (73.4)	15.7 (60.3)	4.4 (39.9)	−10.4 (13.3)	−19.7 (−3.5)	4.3 (39.8)
Daily mean °C (°F)	−26.8 (−16.2)	−22 (−8)	−12.3 (9.9)	0.2 (32.4)	9.2 (48.6)	15.7 (60.3)	18.3 (64.9)	15.4 (59.7)	7.8 (46.0)	−2.9 (26.8)	−18.2 (−0.8)	−26.8 (−16.2)	−3.5 (25.6)
Mean daily minimum °C (°F)	−33.2 (−27.8)	−30.6 (−23.1)	−21.7 (−7.1)	−7 (19)	1.1 (34.0)	7.6 (45.7)	11.9 (53.4)	8.9 (48.0)	0.9 (33.6)	−9.2 (15.4)	−24.2 (−11.6)	−32.2 (−26.0)	−10.6 (12.8)
Record low °C (°F)	−52 (−62)	−52.4 (−62.3)	−45.2 (−49.4)	−32.9 (−27.2)	−14.4 (6.1)	−6.1 (21.0)	−3.5 (25.7)	−4.8 (23.4)	−13.9 (7.0)	−33.9 (−29.0)	−47 (−53)	−50.7 (−59.3)	−52.4 (−62.3)
Average precipitation mm (inches)	5.8 (0.23)	4.2 (0.17)	4.6 (0.18)	16.6 (0.65)	43.4 (1.71)	84.2 (3.31)	116.9 (4.60)	95.2 (3.75)	52.2 (2.06)	22.5 (0.89)	12.1 (0.48)	6.5 (0.26)	464.2 (18.29)
Mean monthly sunshine hours	130.2	182.0	241.8	232.5	251.1	261.0	254.2	229.4	195.0	186.0	126.0	96.1	2,385.3
Source: pogodaiklimat.ru
