= Skovorodinsky District =

Skovorodinsky District Сковородинский район (Russian)
- District
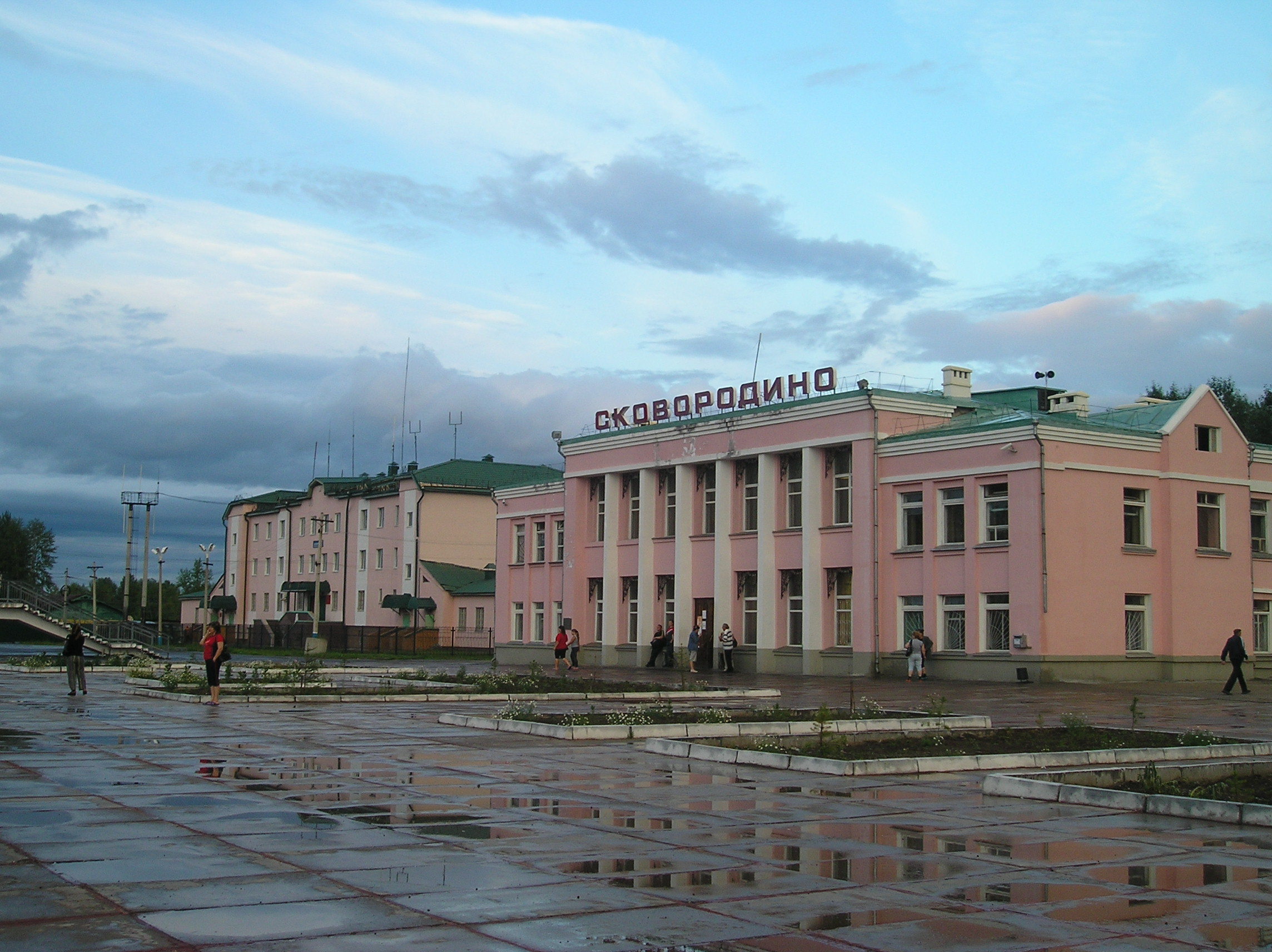
- Skovorodino Railway Station, Skovorodinsky District

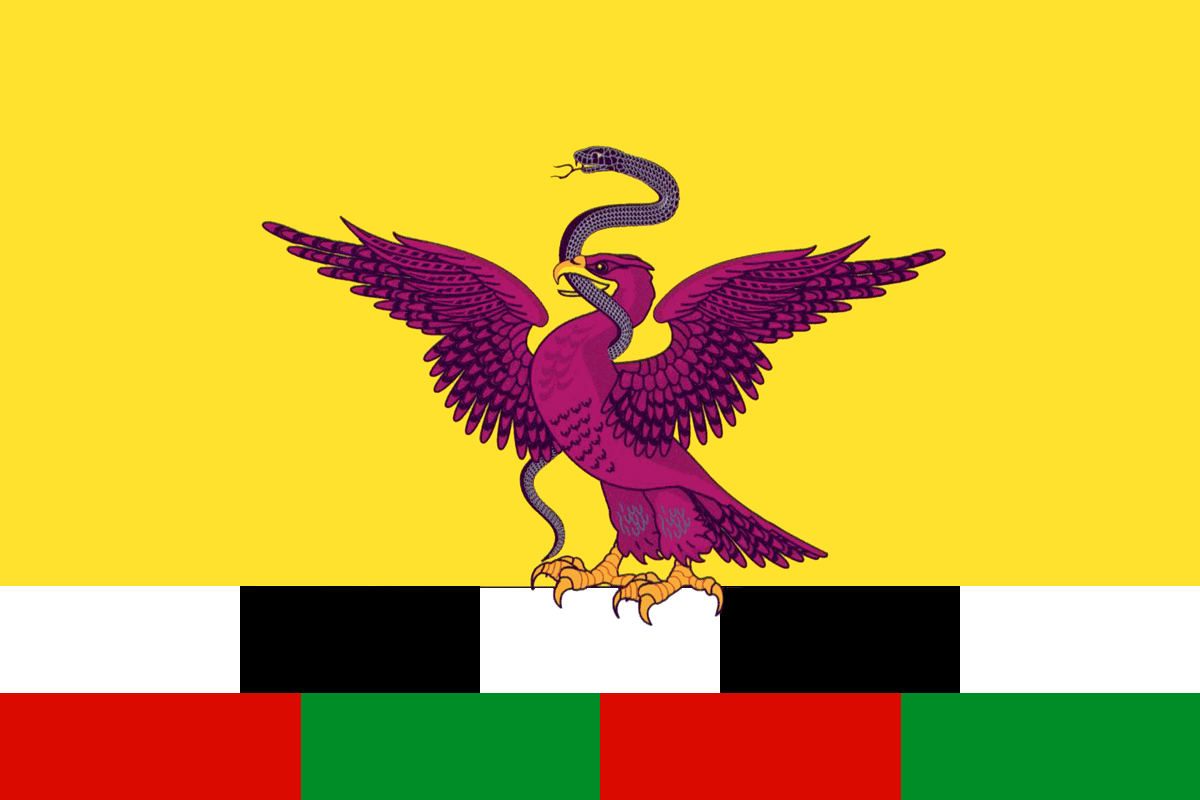
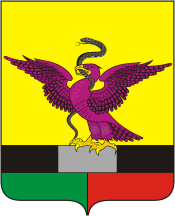
- Flag Coat of arms
- Location of Skovorodinsky District in Amur Oblast
- Coordinates: 53°59′00″N 123°56′00″E
- Country: Russia
- Federal subject: Amur Oblast
- Established: 1926
- Administrative center: Skovorodino

Area
  - Total: 20,509 km^{2} (7,919 sq mi)

Population (2010 Census)
  - Total: 29,558
  - Density: 1.4412/km^{2} (3.7327/sq mi)
  - Urban: 62.6%
  - Rural: 37.4%

Administrative structure
  - Administrative divisions: 1 Urban settlements (towns), 2 Urban settlements (work settlements), 6 Rural settlements
  - Inhabited localities: 1 cities/towns, 2 urban-type settlements, 30 rural localities

Municipal structure
  - Municipally incorporated as: Skovorodinsky Municipal District
  - Municipal divisions: 3 urban settlements, 6 rural settlements
- Time zone: UTC+9 (MSK+6)
- OKTMO ID: 10649000
- Website: http://www.skovorodino.ru/

Skovorodinsky District (Russian: Сковороди́нский райо́н) is an administrative and municipal district (raion), one of the twenty in Amur Oblast, Russia. The area of the district is 20,509 square kilometers (7,919 sq mi). Its administrative center is the town of Skovorodino. Population: 29,558 (2010 census); 34,269 (2002 Census); 42,998 (1989 Soviet census). The population of Skovorodino accounts for 32.4% of the district's total population.
