= 1999 Russian gubernatorial elections =

- 25 April – 26 December 1999

16 Heads of Federal Subjects from 89
- 1999 Russian regional elections: Gubernatorial Legislative Gubernatorial and legislative Referendum Referendum and legislative

Gubernatorial elections in 1999 took place in 16 regions of the Russian Federation.

In 1999, the tenures of the governors of 12 provinces, elected in 1995, expired. An early election was held in Leningrad Oblast, year after resignation of Vadim Gustov. The first direct elections for the Head of Karachay-Cherkessia also took place that year.

In the last two parliamentary republics, Dagestan and Udmurtia, direct elections have not come any closer: in Dagestan, the referendum on the introduction of the presidency was held in the summer of 1999, with the majority voting against; and in Udmurtia, a new State Council was elected and its chairman Alexander Volkov was re-elected.

== Race summary ==
Federal subject	Incumbent	Incumbent since	Election day	Candidates	Result
Karachay-Cherkessia	Vladimir Khubiyev	1992 (Note: Appointed by federal president in 1992, re-appointed in 1995.)	25 April (first round)	Stanislav Derev 39.23%; Vladimir Semyonov 17.63%; Mikhail Yakush (CPRF) 15.89%; Magomed Kaitov 8.47%; Vladimir Khubiyev 6.61%; Boris Ebzeyev 6.57%	Incumbent lost election. New head elected.
Karachay-Cherkessia	Vladimir Khubiyev	1992	16 May (runoff)	✓ Vladimir Semyonov 75.02%; Stanislav Derev 21.39%	Incumbent lost election. New head elected.
Belgorod Oblast (snap election)	Yevgeny Savchenko	1993	30 May	✓ Yevgeny Savchenko 53.46%; Mikhail Beskhmelnitsyn 19.71%; Vladimir Zhirinovsky (LDPR) 17.72%	Incumbent re-elected.
Sverdlovsk Oblast	Eduard Rossel	1995	29 August (first round)	Eduard Rossel (PU–NDR) 38.78%; Alexander Burkov (May) 18.37%; Arkady Chernetsky (NDNG–OVR) 15.50%; Vladimir Kadochnikov (CPRF) 9.63%; Igor Kovpak 8.79%	Incumbent re-elected.
Sverdlovsk Oblast	Eduard Rossel	1995	12 September (runoff)	✓ Eduard Rossel (PU–NDR) 63.09%; Alexander Burkov (May) 28.26%; Against all 6.80%	Incumbent re-elected.
Novgorod Oblast (snap election)	Mikhail Prusak	1991	5 September	✓ Mikhail Prusak 91.56%; Anatoly Peshkov 1.62%	Incumbent re-elected.
Omsk Oblast (snap election)	Leonid Polezhayev	1991	5 September	✓ Leonid Polezhayev 57.03%; Aleksandr Kravets (CPRF) 26.36%; Against all 10.05%	Incumbent re-elected.
Leningrad Oblast (snap election)	Vadim Gustov (resigned) (Note: Resigned in September 1998 to take job as First Deputy Prime Minister of Russia.); Valery Serdyukov (acting)	1996	19 September	✓ Valery Serdyukov 30.30%; Vadim Gustov 22.68%; Valery Kovalyov 17.36%; Viktor Zubkov 8.64%; Damir Shadaev 5.86%; Against all 5.18%	Acting governor elected for a full term.
Tomsk Oblast (snap election)	Viktor Kress	1991	19 September	✓ Viktor Kress 72.92%; Aleksandr Deyev 13.97%	Incumbent re-elected.
Moscow (snap election)	Yury Luzhkov	1992	19 December	✓ Yury Luzhkov (OVR) 69.9%; Sergey Kiriyenko (SPS) 11.3%; Pavel Borodin 6.0%; Against all 5.6%	Incumbent re-elected.
Moscow Oblast	Anatoly Tyazhlov	1991	19 December (first round)	Gennady Seleznyov (CPRF) 27.52%; Boris Gromov (Fatherland) 20.91%; Alexander Tikhonov 15.12%; Anatoly Tyazhlov 10.51%; Boris Fyodorov 9.15%; Vladimir Bryntsalov 5.02%; Against all 5.96%	Incumbent lost re-election. New governor elected.
Moscow Oblast	Anatoly Tyazhlov	1991	9 January 2000 (runoff)	✓ Boris Gromov (Fatherland, backed by Yabloko, SPS) 48.09%; Gennady Seleznyov (CPRF, backed by Unity, LDPR) 46.39%	Incumbent lost re-election. New governor elected.
Novosibirsk Oblast	Vitaly Mukha	1995	19 December (first round)	Viktor Tolokonsky 26.27%; Ivan Starikov (DVR) 20.91%; Vitaly Mukha (Fatherland) 17.90%; Viktor Kuznetsov (CPRF) 15.80%; Konstantin Petrov 4.37%; Yevgeny Loginov 4.26%	Incumbent lost re-election. New governor elected.
Novosibirsk Oblast	Vitaly Mukha	1995	9 January 2000 (runoff)	✓ Viktor Tolokonsky 44.32%; Ivan Starikov (DVR) 42.17%; Against all 12.39%	Incumbent lost re-election. New governor elected.
Orenburg Oblast	Vladimir Yelagin	1991	19 December (first round)	Vladimir Yelagin 33.45%; Alexey Chernyshyov (APR) 23.86%; Pavel Gurkalov 23.42%; Gennady Donkovtsev 8.38%; Against all 5.42%	Incumbent lost re-election. New governor elected.
Orenburg Oblast	Vladimir Yelagin	1991	26 December (runoff)	✓ Alexey Chernyshyov (APR) 52.50%; Vladimir Yelagin 43.51%	Incumbent lost re-election. New governor elected.
Primorsky Krai	Yevgeny Nazdratenko	1993	19 December	✓ Yevgeny Nazdratenko 64.60%; Aleksandr Kirilichev 20.46%	Incumbent re-elected.
Saint Petersburg (snap election)	Vladimir Yakovlev	1996	19 December	Igor Artemyev; Yury Boldyrev; Vladimir Yakovlev; 7 other candidates	Election cancelled (see 2000 elections).
Tambov Oblast	Aleksandr Ryabov	1995	19 December (first round)	Aleksandr Ryabov (CPRF) 29.29%; Oleg Betin (supported by NDR, Unity) 28.54%; Andrey Frantz (May) 13.93%; Vladimir Puchnin 6.40%; Against all 9.82%	Incumbent lost re-election. Former governor elected.
Tambov Oblast	Aleksandr Ryabov	1995	26 December (runoff)	✓ Oleg Betin (supported by NDR, Unity) 50.34%; Aleksandr Ryabov (CPRF) 44.16%	Incumbent lost re-election. Former governor elected.
Tver Oblast	Vladimir Platov	1995	19 December (first round)	Vladimir Platov 32.51%; Vladimir Bayunov (CPRF) 22.91%; Sergey Potapov (Fatherland) 12.49%; Gennady Vinogradov 5.95%; Nikolay Popov 5.49%; Against all 6.18%	Incumbent re-elected.
Tver Oblast	Vladimir Platov	1995	9 January 2000 (runoff)	✓ Vladimir Platov (backed by Unity, SPS) 46.54%; Vladimir Bayunov (CPRF) 46.02%; Against all 6.56%	Incumbent re-elected.
Vologda Oblast (snap election)	Vyacheslav Pozgalyov	1996	19 December	✓ Vyacheslav Pozgalyov 78.55%; Sergey Karonnov (SPS) 9.82%; Against all 10.36%	Incumbent re-elected.
Yaroslavl Oblast	Anatoly Lisitsyn	1991	19 December	✓ Anatoly Lisitsyn 63.88%; Sergey Vakhrukov (Yabloko) 14.04%; Vladimir Kornilov (CPRF) 10.80%; Against all 7.47%	Incumbent re-elected.

== Karachay-Cherkessia ==
In April and May 1999, elections were held for the head of Karachay-Cherkessia. The mayor of Cherkessk Stanislav Derev received 43.1% of the vote in the first round, surpassing former Commander-in-Chief of the Russian Ground Forces general Vladimir Semyonov, with 17.9% of the vote. After the first round, confrontation started to arise between the frontrunners. The rivalry of Semyonov and Derev was viewed as a confrontation between the Karachays and Circassians.

On the morning of May 16, the roads to areas with Karachay majority or mixed Karachay-Russian population were blocked by the police and OMON. By Derev's order, more than 60 polling stations were closed in Cherkessk, although later, through the efforts of the CEC, voting began in most of them. Semyonov received 75.5% of the vote, with about 18.6% for Derev. After the second round, Derev's supporters organized a rally in the center of Cherkessk, demanding the annulling of the falsified election results.

On May 19, after negotiations in Moscow, Derev stated that he was demanding either the cancellation of the election results, or the secession of Cherkessia. At the same time, he applied to the Supreme Court of Russia and the Central Election Commission with a request to cancel the results of the second round. On May 24, after the visit of the Prime Minister of Russia Sergey Stepashin to Cherkessk, the head of Karachay-Cherkessia Vladimir Khubiyev resigned. Igor Ivanov, chairman of the People's Assembly of Karachay-Cherkessia, was appointed as the interim head of the region.

In July, the Supreme Court of the KChR recognized the results of the elections; later, this decision was overturned by the Supreme Court of Russia. In late August 1999, the republican court reaffirmed the results of the vote on May 16. On September 14, Semyonov took office as head of the republic, which marked the end of the conflict.

== Sverdlovsk Oblast ==
Candidate	Party	First round		Second round	
Candidate	Party	Votes	%	Votes	%
Eduard Rossel	Transformation of Ural	542,257	39.73	813,373	64.27
Alexander Burkov	Workers' Movement for Social Guarantees "May"	256,916	18.83	364,301	28.79
Arkady Chernetsky	Our Home — Our City	216,738	15.88		
Vladimir Kadochnikov	Communist Party	134,607	9.86		
Igor Kovpak	Independent	122,948	9.01		
Irina Belkova	Independent	15,401	1.13		
Andrey Selivanov	Right Cause	8,628	0.63		
Against all		67,260	4.93	87,862	6.94
Total		1,364,755	100.00	1,265,536	100.00
Source: IKSO

== Moscow City ==
In June 1999 the Moscow City Duma decided to move the 2000 mayoral election six months ahead of schedule. The new voting day was set on 19 December 1999, when the elections to the 3rd State Duma of Russia were to take place.

On September 17, the incumbent mayor of Moscow Yury Luzhkov officially announced his intention to run for re-election, naming Valery Shantsev as his candidate for the vice mayor. Opposition, represented by the Union of Right Forces, nominated former prime minister of Russia Sergey Kiriyenko. Luzhkov surpassed him by more than 58%. Two thirds of the voters came to the polling stations in Moscow on December 19.

Candidate	Running mate	Party	Votes	%
Yury Luzhkov	Valery Shantsev	Fatherland – All Russia	3,174,658	71.45
Sergey Kiriyenko	Vyacheslav Glazychev	Union of Right Forces	510,958	11.50
Pavel Borodin	Leonid Troshin	Independent	273,026	6.14
Yevgeny Martynov	Sergey Seryogin	Communist Party	128,404	2.89
Dmitry Vasilyev	Alexander Netesov	Pamyat	47,067	1.06
Aleksey Mitrofanov	Andrey Brezhnev	Independent	27,528	0.62
Vladimir Voronin	Svetlana Savinova	Independent	18,564	0.42
Vladimir Kiselyov	Valery Kireyev	Independent	8,944	0.20
Against all			254,013	5.72
Total			4,443,162	100.00
Valid votes			4,443,162	97.82
Invalid/blank votes			98,974	2.18
Total votes			4,542,136	100.00
Source: Zakon

== Moscow Oblast ==
Gubernatorial election in Moscow Oblast was held on 19 December 1999, in parallel with the federal legislative election. The peculiarity of this campaign was that the candidates for the governor were running along with the candidates for the vice-governor (this office will be abolished in 2002). The Fatherland – All Russia party (OVR), realizing low chances to win for incumbent governor Anatoly Tyazhlov, authorized the nomination of Soviet Army general Boris Gromov. That is, OVR had two candidates for governor at once. On 9 January 2000, Boris Gromov was elected governor of Moscow Oblast in the second round of the election.

=== Candidates ===
- Vladimir Bryntsalov (RSP), Member of State Duma (1996–present)
  - Vladimir Alexeyev, Deputy Chairman of the Moscow Oblast Duma (1997–present), Member of the Oblast Duma (1993–present)
- Anatoly Dolgolaptev (Independent), Member of Moscow Oblast Duma (1997–present), former Deputy Chairman of the Federation Council (1994–1996)
  - Vladimir Menshov (All Russia), actor, film director
- Boris Fyodorov (Forward, Russia!), former Deputy Chairman of the Government of Russia (1992–1994, 1998), former Minister of Finance of Russia (1993–1994)
  - Alexander Lebedev (NDR), billionaire businessman, banker
- Boris Gromov (OVR), Member of State Duma (1996–present)
  - Mikhail Men (Yabloko), Member of State Duma (1996–present)
- Vladimir Klimenko (Independent), Deputy Minister of Emergency Situations of Russia (1998–present), former Chairman of the Moscow Oblast Council of People's Deputies (1993)
  - Yury Tebin, Member of Moscow Oblast Duma (1997–present)
- Sergey Popov (Independent), Member of State Duma (1996–present)
  - Ilshat Safargaliyev (For Justice and Equality), businessman
- Gennadiy Seleznyov (CPRF), Chairman of the State Duma (1996–present), Member of State Duma (1994–present)
  - Vladimir Kashin (CPRF), director of the All-Russia Breeding-Technological Institute of Horticulture and Arboriculture
- Alexander Tikhonov (Independent), 1968, 1972, 1976 and 1980 Olympic Champion biathlete
  - Sergey Selivyorstov, retired Militsiya Colonel, Hero of Russia (1993)
- Anatoly Tyazhlov (OVR), incumbent Governor of Moscow Oblast (1991–present)
  - Vasily Golubev (Independent), incumbent Vice Governor of Moscow Oblast (1999–present)

=== Results ===
Candidate	Running mate	Party	First round		Second round	
Candidate	Running mate	Party	Votes	%	Votes	%
Boris Gromov	Mikhail Men	Fatherland – All Russia	690,352	21.36	1,174,880	48.84
Gennadiy Seleznyov	Vladimir Kashin	Communist Party	908,874	28.12	1,133,440	47.12
Alexander Tikhonov	Sergey Selivyorstov	Independent	499,231	15.45		
Anatoly Tyazhlov	Vasily Golubev	Fatherland – All Russia	346,947	10.73		
Boris Fyodorov	Alexander Lebedev	Forward, Russia!	302,081	9.35		
Vladimir Bryntsalov	Vladimir Alexeyev	Russian Socialist Party	165,742	5.13		
Anatoly Dolgolaptev	Vladimir Menshov	Independent	45,540	1.41		
Sergey Popov	Ilshat Safargaliyev	Independent	39,195	1.21		
Vladimir Klimenko	Yury Tebin	Independent	37,367	1.16		
Against all			196,779	6.09	97,171	4.04
Total			3,232,108	100.00	2,405,491	100.00
Valid votes			3,232,108	97.88		
Invalid/blank votes			70,137	2.12		
Total votes			3,302,245	100.00		
Registered voters/turnout			5,336,797	61.88		

== Tver Oblast ==
1999–2000 Tver Oblast gubernatorial election
- 19 December 1999 (first round); 9 January 2000 (second round)
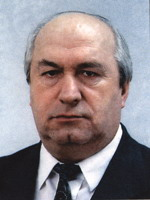

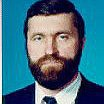
Candidate	Vladimir Platov	Vladimir Bayunov
Party	Independent	CPRF
Alliance	Unity
Popular vote	299,832	296,465
Percentage	46.54%	46.02%
- Election results by district
Governor before election
Vladimir Platov
Independent
Elected Governor
Vladimir Platov
Independent

Incumbent governor Vladimir Platov ran for a second four-year term. In the first round, held on 19 December 1999, none of the candidates received an absolute majority. In the second round on 9 January 2000 Platov narrowly won over Communist challenger Vladimir Bayunov.

=== Candidates ===
- Vladimir Bayunov (CPRF), member of the State Duma for the Bezhetsk constituency (1994–2000)
- Viktor Opekunov (OVR), first deputy governor of Tver Oblast
- Anatoly Kleymenov, chairman of the economy committee of Tver Oblast administration
- Vladimir Platov, governor of Tver Oblast (1995–2003), 1999 State Duma Unity party-list candidate (refused to take his seat)
- Nikolay Popov, member of the Legislative Assembly of Tver Oblast
- Arnold Pork, vice president of Trans Nafta CJSC
- Sergey Potapov, member of the Legislative Assembly of Tver Oblast
- Vasily Smirnov (RKPP), chairman of regional branch of the Russian Conservative Party of Entrepreneurs
- Andrey Stroyev, entrepreneur
- Andrey Trachenko, deputy director general of Rumelco LLC
- Gennady Vinogradov (Yabloko), employee at regional office of the Bank of Russia

=== Results ===
Candidate	Party	First round		Second round	
Candidate	Party	Votes	%	Votes	%
Vladimir Platov	Independent	257,483	32.51	299,832	46.54
Vladimir Bayunov	Communist Party	181,413	22.91	296,465	46.02
Sergey Potapov	Independent	98,911	12.49		
Gennady Vinogradov	Yabloko	47,115	5.95		
Nikolay Popov	Independent	43,494	5.49		
Viktor Opekunov	Fatherland – All Russia	29,490	3.72		
Andrey Stroyev	Independent	29,350	3.71		
Andrey Trachenko	Independent	21,882	2.76		
Anatoly Kleymenov	Independent	12,331	1.56		
Vasily Smirnov	Russian Conservative Party of Entrepreneurs	10,166	1.28		
Arnold Pork	Independent	2,461	0.31		
Against all		48,930	6.18	42,242	6.56
Invalid ballots		8,893	1.12	5,641	0.88
Total					
Total votes		791,919	–	644,180	–
Registered voters/turnout		1,214,878	65.19	1,214,694	53.03
