= 1995 Russian gubernatorial elections =

- 6 August – 30 December 1995

15 Heads of Federal Subjects from 89
- 1995 Russian regional elections: Gubernatorial Legislative Legislative (of another subject) Referendum Referendum and legislative

Gubernatorial elections in 1995 took place in fifteen regions of the Russian Federation.

== Background ==
On 3 October 1994, the President of Russia Boris Yeltsin signed the Decree No. 1969 stating that elections for heads of administrations should be held only with the president's permission, until another procedure is established by federal law.

The head of administration is included in the unified system of executive power in the Russian Federation, formed by the federal executive bodies and executive bodies of the regions ... is subordinate to the President and the Government of Russia ... Appointment and dismissal of heads of administrations of krais, oblasts, federal cities, autonomous entities is made by decrees of the President on the proposal of the Chairman of the Government

In August 1995, elections for the head of the administration of Sverdlovsk Oblast, unauthorized by the president, were held, and on December 17, in accordance with a presidential decree, elections were scheduled in 11 regions. In the same year, the president of Kalmykia was re-elected and the head of the Chechen Republic was elected.

== Race summary ==
Federal subject	Incumbent	Incumbent since	Election day	Candidates	Result
Sverdlovsk Oblast	Aleksey Strakhov	1994	6 August (first round)	Eduard Rossel 26.01%; Aleksey Strakhov (NDR) 23.44%; Valery Trushnikov 20.30%; Vladimir Kadochnikov (CPRF) 8.06%; Malik Gaisin 4.89%	Incumbent lost election. Former governor elected.
Sverdlovsk Oblast	Aleksey Strakhov	1994	20 August (runoff)	✓ Eduard Rossel 59.86%; Aleksey Strakhov (NDR) 32.10%	Incumbent lost election. Former governor elected.
Kalmykia (snap election)	Kirsan Ilyumzhinov	1993	15 October	✓ Kirsan Ilyumzhinov 85.09% (ran unopposed)	Incumbent re-elected.
Chechnya	Doku Zavgayev	1995 (Note: Prime minister of the (pro-Russian) Government of national revival since October 1995, contested by Dzhokhar Dudayev as president of the Chechen Republic of Ichkeria.)	17 December	✓ Doku Zavgayev 74.8% (ran unopposed)	Incumbent elected to full term.
Chuvashia (referendum)	Nikolay Fyodorov	1993	17 December	✓ No (retain the presidency) 48.47%; Yes (abolish the presidency) 47.76%	Office of president preserved.
Primorsky Krai	Yevgeny Nazdratenko	1993	17 December	✓ Yevgeny Nazdratenko (NDR) 68.55%; Viktor Cherepkov 17.24%	Incumbent elected to full term.
Belgorod Oblast	Yevgeny Savchenko	1993	17 December	✓ Yevgeny Savchenko (NDR, APR) 55.54%; Mikhail Beskhmenitsyn (CPRF, RCWP, Derzhava) 32.19%; Sergey Sychyov (LDPR) 6.04%	Incumbent elected to full term.
Moscow Oblast	Anatoly Tyazhlov	1991	17 December (first round)	Anatoly Tyazhlov (NDR) 43.33%; Valery Galchenko (supported by Yabloko, DVR) 14.67%; Oleg Antonov (supported by CPRF, APR) 14.07%; Viktor Dorkin (supported by KRO) 5.74%; Against all 12.56%	Incumbent elected to full term.
Moscow Oblast	Anatoly Tyazhlov	1991	30 December (runoff)	✓ Anatoly Tyazhlov (NDR) 70.83%; Valery Galchenko 21.41%	Incumbent elected to full term.
Nizhny Novgorod Oblast	Boris Nemtsov	1991	17 December	✓ Boris Nemtsov 58.37%; Vyacheslav Rasteryayev 26.17%; Oleg Maslov (KRO) 6.17%	Incumbent elected to full term.
Novgorod Oblast	Mikhail Prusak	1991	17 December	✓ Mikhail Prusak (NDR) 56.17%; Anatoly Kuznetsov 8.94%; Valery Gaidym (CPRF) 8.72%	Incumbent elected to full term.
Novosibirsk Oblast	Ivan Indinok	1993	17 December (first round)	Ivan Indinok (NDR) 22.81%; Vitaly Mukha 18.12%; Aleksey Manannikov 17.49%; Ivan Starikov 16.72%; Yevgeny Loginov (LDPR) 15.58%	Incumbent lost election. Former governor elected.
Novosibirsk Oblast	Ivan Indinok	1993	24 December (runoff)	✓ Vitaly Mukha 54.04%; Ivan Indinok (NDR) 37.24%	Incumbent lost election. Former governor elected.
Omsk Oblast	Leonid Polezhayev	1991	17 December	✓ Leonid Polezhayev (NDR) 59.62%; Viktor Lotkov 13.75%; Leonid Gorynin (KRO) 8.79%; Yevgeny Pokhitailo (CPRF) 8.27%	Incumbent elected to full term.
Orenburg Oblast	Vladimir Yelagin	1991	17 December	✓ Vladimir Yelagin (NDR) 58.78%; Gennady Donkovtsev 21.69%; Yury Kalyuzhny (Derzhava) 7.79%	Incumbent elected to full term.
Tambov Oblast	Oleg Betin	1995	17 December (first round)	Oleg Betin (NDR) 41.97%; Aleksandr Ryabov (CPRF) 36.80%; Pavel Gorbunov 7.34%; Yury Baturov 5.09%; Against all 6.80%	Incumbent lost election. New governor elected.
Tambov Oblast	Oleg Betin	1995	24 December (runoff)	✓ Aleksandr Ryabov (CPRF) 52.62%; Oleg Betin (NDR) 43.48%	Incumbent lost election. New governor elected.
Tomsk Oblast	Viktor Kress	1991	17 December	✓ Viktor Kress (NDR) 52.09%; Pyotr Koshel (LDPR) 15.52%; Ivan Tyutrin 15.10%; Rostislav Popadeykin 9.61%	Incumbent elected to full term.
Tver Oblast	Vladimir Suslov	1991	17 December	✓ Vladimir Platov (supported by CPRF, APR, Yabloko) 50.50%; Vladimir Suslov (NDR) 35.16%; Against all 6.73%	Incumbent lost election. New governor elected.
Yaroslavl Oblast	Anatoly Lisitsyn	1991	17 December	✓ Anatoly Lisitsyn (NDR) 51.81%; Vladimir Kornilov (CPRF) 33.10%	Incumbent elected to full term.

== Kalmykia ==
1995 Kalmyk presidential election
- 15 October 1995
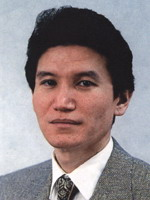

Candidate	Kirsan Ilyumzhinov	Against all
Running mate	Valery Bogdanov
Percentage	85.09%	11.35%
- Ilyumzhinov: 60–70%; 70–80%; 80–90%; >90%
President before election
Kirsan Ilyumzhinov
Elected President
Kirsan Ilyumzhinov

A snap presidential election was held in Kalmykia on 15 October 1995. Kirsan Ilyumzhinov was re-elected, running unopposed. This term (seven years) was the longest among the Russian governors. According to Ilyumzhinov himself, his competitors failed to collect signatures for registration, and Ilyumzhinov's administration decided not to find any nominal candidate, because he did not want to "fool the people".

== Chechnya ==
The 1995 elections for the head of Chechen Republic were held on December 17, simultaneously with the elections to the State Duma. Contrary to the laws of Russia, but according to the decision of the Supreme Council of the former Checheno-Ingushetia (which was restored as a temporary authority of Chechnya), every resident of Chechnya could vote wherever it suits them. The separatists staged a number of provocations. A few hours before the elections, a hospital in Gudermes was stormed by them. One of the schools in Grozny, where the polling station was located, was thrown by militants with grenades.

On December 6, the congress of the "Union of the People for the Revival of the Republic" was failed to held because of the government restrictions: delegates from the southern parts of Chechnya were stopped at checkpoints. The union was headed by the former chairman of the Supreme Soviet of Russia Ruslan Khasbulatov, considered Zavgayev's only real rival. For these reasons, on December 9, Khasbulatov withdrew from the elections.

According to official sources, 50.43% of Chechnya's residents took part in the voting. In addition, Russian military contingent stationed in Chechnya (about 40 thousand people) took part in the elections. The elections were monitored by 60 OSCE representatives, as well as 150 Russian and international observers, and no serious violations were identified. Other sources stating that OSCE representatives left Chechnya during the elections and none of the international observers attended the voting.

== Sources ==
- Ivanov, Vitaly (2019). Глава субъекта Российской Федерации. История губернаторов. Том I [Head of the subject of the Russian Federation. History of governors. Volume I] (in Russian). ISBN 978-5-907250-14-7.
