= 2025 Chuvash head election =

- 12–14 September 2025
- Turnout: 58.42% ▲2.99 pp
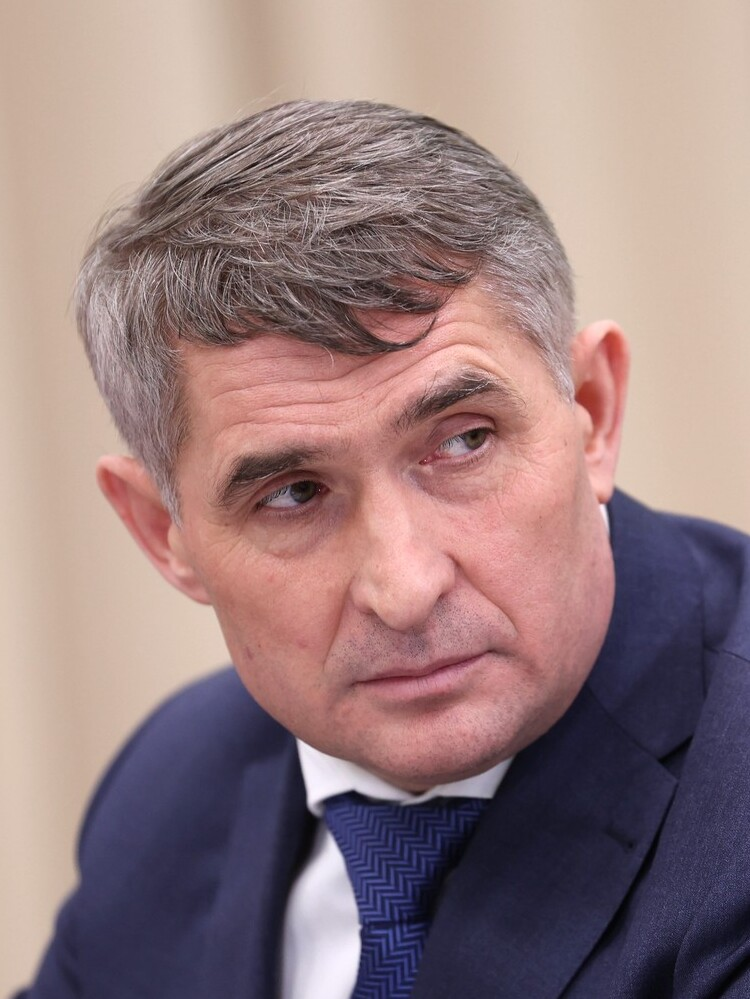

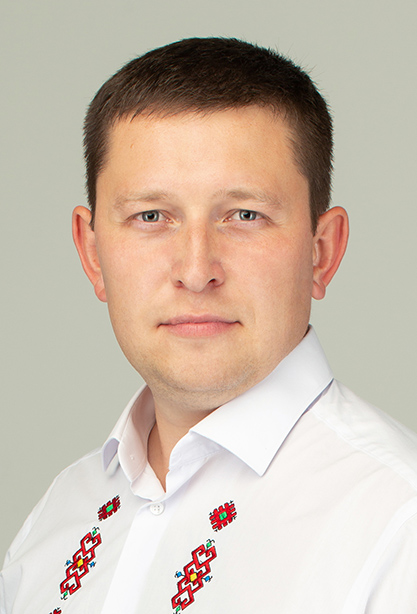
Candidate	Oleg Nikolayev	Konstantin Stepanov
Party	Independent	LDPR
Popular vote	355,975	75,566
Percentage	67.06%	14.23%
	NL	RPPSS
Candidate	Maksim Morozov	Vladimir Ilyin
Party	New People	Party of Pensioners
Popular vote	44,430	29,517
Percentage	8.37%	5.56%
Head before election
Oleg Nikolayev
SRZP
Head-elect
Oleg Nikolayev
SRZP

The 2025 Head of the Chuvash Republic election were held on 12–14 September 2025, on common election day. Incumbent Head Oleg Nikolayev was re-elected to a second full term in office.

== Background ==
Oleg Nikolayev, then–State Duma member and chairman of the Duma Committee on Nationalities, was appointed acting head of the Chuvash Republic in January 2020. His predecessor, Mikhail Ignatyev was dismissed by President Vladimir Putin for the "loss of trust" in January 2020 and died in July 2020 after contracting COVID-19. Nikolayev previously ran for Head of Chuvashia in 2015 as an A Just Russia candidate and finished in second place with 14.73% of the vote.

Oleg Nikolayev, an A Just Russia – For Truth member and chairman of the Chuvash regional party council since 2018, ran for a full term as Head of Chuvashia as an independent with the support from A Just Russia and United Russia. Nikolayev won the election with 75.61% of the vote, defeating State Council of the Chuvash Republic member Aleksandr Andreyev (CPRF) by 65 points. Since the resignation of Alexander Burkov as Governor of Omsk Oblast in March 2023 Nikolayev has remained the only A Just Russia – For Truth governor in Russia.

In March 2025 during a meeting with President Vladimir Putin Head Nikolayev announced his intention to run for a second term and received Putin's endorsement. On May 23, 2025, Nikolayev announced that he would seek re-election as an independent. Nikolayev subsequently received support from A Just Russia, United Russia and CPRF.

== Candidates ==
In Chuvashia candidates for head can be nominated by registered political parties or by self-nomination. Candidate for Head of the Chuvash Republic should be a Russian citizen and at least 30 years old. Candidates for head should not have a foreign citizenship or residence permit. Each candidate in order to be registered is required to collect at least 7% of signatures of members and heads of municipalities. In addition, self-nominated candidates should collect 0.5% of signatures of Chuvashia residents. Also head candidates present 3 candidacies to the Federation Council and election winner later appoints one of the presented candidates.

=== Declared ===
Candidate name, political party		Occupation	Status	Ref.
Vladimir Ilyin; Party of Pensioners		Businessman	Registered	
Maksim Morozov; New People		Businessman	Registered	
Oleg Nikolayev; Independent	Oleg Nikolayev	Incumbent Head of the Chuvash Republic (2020–present)	Registered	
Vladimir Savinov; The Greens		Forensic professional	Registered	
Konstantin Stepanov; Liberal Democratic Party	Konstantin Stepanov	Member of State Council of the Chuvash Republic (2017–present); 2020 head candidate	Registered	
Viktor Fedorov; Independent		Former Member of Cheboksary City Assembly of Deputies (2005–2015); Nonprofit president	Did not file	

=== Declined ===
- Aleksandr Andreyev (CPRF), Member of State Council of the Chuvash Republic (2016–present), 2020 head candidate
- Grigory Danilov (New People), Member of State Council of the Chuvash Republic (2016–present)
- Nikolay Fyodorov (United Russia), Senator from Chuvashia (2010–2012, 2015–present), former President of the Chuvash Republic (1994–2010)

== Polls ==
Fieldwork date	Polling firm	Nikolayev	Stepanov	Morozov	Ilyin	Savinov	Lead
14 September 2025	2025 election	67.1	14.2	8.4	5.6	3.2	52.9
9–22 August 2025	FOM	72.2	11.0	7.6	4.7	3.5	61.2

== Results ==
Summary of the 12–14 September 2025 Chuvash head election results
Candidate	Party	Votes	%
Oleg Nikolayev (incumbent)	Independent	355,975	67.06
Konstantin Stepanov	Liberal Democratic Party	75,566	14.23
Maksim Morozov	New People	44,430	8.37
Vladimir Ilyin	Party of Pensioners	29,517	5.56
Vladimir Savinov	The Greens	16,704	3.15
Valid votes		522,192	98.37
Blank ballots		8,660	1.63
Total		530,852	100.00
Turnout		530,852	58.42
Registered voters		908,705	100.00

Head Nikolayev re-appointed incumbent Senator Nikolay Fyodorov (United Russia) to the Federation Council.

== See also ==
- 2025 Russian regional elections
