= Bezhetsk constituency =

Russian legislative constituency

Bezhetsk single-member constituency
- Constituency of the Russian State Duma

- Constituency boundaries from 1993 to 2007
- Deputy: None
- Federal subject: Tver Oblast
- Districts: Bezhetsky, Bologovsky, Firovsky, Kalyazinsky, Kashinsky, Kesovogorsky, Kimrsky, Kimry, Konakovsky, Krasnokholmsky, Lesnoy, Likhoslavlsky, Maksatikhinsky, Molokovsky, Ostashkovsky, Ozyorny, Penovsky, Rameshkovsky, Sandovsky, Solnechny, Sonkovsky, Spirovsky, Torzhok, Torzhoksky, Udomelsky, Vesyegonsky, Vyshnevolotsky, Vyshny Volochyok
- Voters: 580,693 (2003)

The Bezhetsk constituency (No.172 (Note: No.171 in 1993-1995)) was a Russian legislative constituency in Tver Oblast in 1993-2007. It covered northern and eastern parts of Tver Oblast. The seat was last occupied by United Russia deputy Aleksandr Tyagunov, a former Deputy Governor of Tver Oblast, who defeated incumbent first-term Communist State Duma member and journalist Vyacheslav Zorkin in the 2003 election.

The constituency was dissolved in 2007 when State Duma adopted full proportional representation for the next two electoral cycles. Bezhetsk constituency was not re-established for the 2016 election, currently most of former Bezhetsk constituency is part of Tver constituency.

== Boundaries ==
1993–2007: Bezhetsk, Bezhetsky District, Bologovsky District, Bologoye, Firovsky District, Kalyazinsky District, Kashin, Kashinsky District, Kesovogorsky District, Kimrsky District, Kimry, Konakovo, Konakovsky District, Krasnokholmsky District, Lesnoy District, Likhoslavlsky District, Maksatikhinsky District, Molokovsky District, Ostashkov, Ostashkovsky District, Ozyorny, Penovsky District, Rameshkovsky District, Sandovsky District, Solnechny, Sonkovsky District, Spirovsky District, Torzhok, Torzhoksky District, Udomelsky District, Udomlya, Vesyegonsky, Vyshnevolotsky, Vyshny Volochyok
The constituency covered northern and eastern Tver Oblast, including the towns of Bezhetsk, Bologoye, Kashin, Kimry, Konakovo, Ostashkov, Torzhok and Udomlya.

== Members elected ==
| Election | Member | Party |
|---|---|---|
| 1993 | Vladimir Bayunov | Independent |
| 1995 | Vladimir Bayunov | Communist Party |
| 1999 | Vyacheslav Zorkin | Communist Party |
| 2003 | Aleksandr Tyagunov | United Russia |

== Election results ==
=== 1993 ===
==== Declared candidates ====
- Vladimir Bayunov (Independent), former First Secretary of the CPSU Bezhetsk City Committee (1990–1991), agriculture businessman
- Aleksandr Ivanov (Civic Union), forest ranger
- Nikolay Mokreyev (APR), kolkhoz chairman
- Vladimir Platov (Independent), Mayor of Bezhetsk and Bezhetsky District (1992–present)
- Margarita Zheleznova (PRES), art historian

==== Results ====
Summary of the 12 December 1993 Russian legislative election in the Bezhetsk constituency
| Candidate | Party | Votes | % |
|---|---|---|---|
| Vladimir Bayunov | Independent | 94,200 | 24.31% |
| Margarita Zheleznova | Party of Russian Unity and Accord | 93,418 | 24.11% |
| Vladimir Platov | Independent | 57,134 | 14.74% |
| Nikolay Mokeyev | Agrarian Party | 36,943 | 9.53% |
| Aleksandr Ivanov | Civic Union | 24,688 | 6.37% |
| against all | | 53,154 | 13.72% |
| Total | | 387,496 | 100% |

=== 1995 ===
==== Declared candidates ====
- Vladimir Baranov (Forward, Russia!), entrepreneur
- Vladimir Bayunov (CPRF), incumbent Member of State Duma (1994–present)
- Roman Blokhin (Independent), businessman
- Andrey Dementyev (BIR), poet, journalist
- Tatyana Kalinina (APR), agriculture executive
- Mark Khasainov (Independent), Member of Vyshny Volochyok Council (1994–present), businessman
- Vladimir Lebedev (NDR), electric bulb plant director
- Vladimir Polevanov (For the Motherland!), former Deputy Prime Minister of Russia (1994–1995)
- Mikhail Vtulkin (Independent), businessman

==== Results ====
Summary of the 17 December 1995 Russian legislative election in the Bezhetsk constituency
| Candidate | Party | Votes | % |
|---|---|---|---|
| Vladimir Bayunov (incumbent) | Communist Party | 132,554 | 30.30% |
| Vladimir Lebedev | Our Home – Russia | 58,058 | 13.27% |
| Tatyana Kalinina | Agrarian Party | 54,176 | 12.38% |
| Vladimir Polevanov | For the Motherland! | 35,160 | 8.04% |
| Vladimir Baranov | Forward, Russia! | 31,270 | 7.15% |
| Roman Blokhin | Independent | 19,297 | 4.41% |
| Andrey Dementyev | Ivan Rybkin Bloc | 18,125 | 4.14% |
| Mikhail Vtulkin | Independent | 13,701 | 3.13% |
| Mark Khasainov | Independent | 9,667 | 2.21% |
| against all | | 52,855 | 12.08% |
| Total | | 437,532 | 100% |

=== 1999 ===
==== Declared candidates ====
- Sergey Bystrov (Independent), Deputy Governor of Tver Oblast (1999–present)
- Vladimir Kostyuchenko (Independent), veterans rights activist
- Valery Nikitin (DN), retired Air Force major general
- Sergey Osadchy (Independent), Member of Moscow City Duma (1993–present)
- Nikolay Rumyantsev (SPS), chairman of the New Force party regional office
- Dmitry Shebalin (Independent), management consultant
- Vyacheslav Vorontsov (KRO-Boldyrev), Deputy Head of the Ministry of Internal Affairs General Directorate of Personnel (1998–present)
- Yury Zimin (LDPR), businessman
- Vladimir Zorin (NDR), Member of State Duma (1996–present), Chairman of the Duma Committee on Nationalities (1996–present)
- Vyacheslav Zorkin (CPRF), Member of Legislative Assembly of Tver Oblast (1997–present), journalist

==== Withdrawn candidates ====
- Vladimir Danilov (Unity), Member of Legislative Assembly of Tver Oblast (1994–present)
- Mark Khasainov (Independent), Mayor of Vyshny Volochyok (1996–present), 1995 candidate for this seat

==== Failed to qualify ====
- Nadezhda Goncharova (Independent), lawyer

==== Did not file ====
- Pyotr Shubin (Independent), paramedic
- Konstantin Yakovidi (Independent), farmer
- Ivan Zaikin (KtR–zSS), former Member of Legislative Assembly of Tver Oblast (1994–1997)

==== Declined ====
- Vladimir Bayunov (CPRF), incumbent Member of State Duma (1994–present) (running for governor)

==== Results ====
Summary of the 19 December 1999 Russian legislative election in the Bezhetsk constituency
| Candidate | Party | Votes | % |
|---|---|---|---|
| Vyacheslav Zorkin | Communist Party | 100,854 | 26.14% |
| Sergey Bystrov | Independent | 54,922 | 14.23% |
| Nikolay Rumyantsev | Union of Right Forces | 35,553 | 9.21% |
| Vladimir Kostyuchenko | Independent | 32,258 | 8.36% |
| Vladimir Zorin | Our Home – Russia | 26,445 | 6.85% |
| Yury Zimin | Liberal Democratic Party | 26,103 | 6.76% |
| Vyacheslav Vorontsov | Congress of Russian Communities-Yury Boldyrev Movement | 13,609 | 3.53% |
| Sergey Osadchy | Independent | 11,192 | 2.90% |
| Dmitry Shebalin | Independent | 7,133 | 1.85% |
| Valery Nikitin | Spiritual Heritage | 6,368 | 1.65% |
| against all | | 57,348 | 14.86% |
| Total | | 385,879 | 100% |

=== 2003 ===
==== Declared candidates ====
- Aleksandr Anokhin (LDPR), hydrogeology executive
- Vladimir Bayunov (Independent), chief of staff to CPRF faction in the State Duma (2000–present), former Member of State Duma (1994–1999), 1999 gubernatorial candidate
- Boris Fomin (ROPP), businessman
- Nadezhda Goncharova (Independent), news executive, 1999 candidate for this seat
- Mikhail Markelov (Rodina), journalist
- Galina Mefed (Yabloko), individual entrepreneur
- Kirill Monastyrsky (ORP Rus'), waiter
- Leonid Ostrenkov (APR), former People's Deputy of Russia (1990–1993)
- Nikolay Rumyantsev (SPS), nonprofit executive, 1999 candidate for this seat
- Sergey Selyvanov (VR–ES), former Head of Administration of Rameshkovsky District (1996–2000)
- Aleksandr Tsalko (Independent), former People's Deputy of the Soviet Union (1989–1991)
- Aleksandr Tyagunov (United Russia), Deputy Governor of Tver Oblast (2000–present), former Member of State Duma (1996–1999)
- Vyacheslav Zorkin (CPRF), incumbent Member of State Duma (2000–present)

==== Results ====
Summary of the 7 December 2003 Russian legislative election in the Bezhetsk constituency
| Candidate | Party | Votes | % |
|---|---|---|---|
| Aleksandr Tyagunov | United Russia | 66,106 | 19.93% |
| Vladimir Bayunov | Independent | 54,634 | 16.47% |
| Vyacheslav Zorkin (incumbent) | Communist Party | 36,090 | 10.88% |
| Boris Fomin | Russian United Industrial Party | 18,192 | 5.49% |
| Aleksandr Anokhin | Liberal Democratic Party | 16,181 | 4.88% |
| Aleksandr Tsalko | Independent | 12,436 | 3.75% |
| Leonid Ostrenkov | Agrarian Party | 10,307 | 3.11% |
| Mikhail Markelov | Rodina | 9,880 | 2.98% |
| Nadezhda Goncharova | Independent | 9,751 | 2.94% |
| Nikolay Rumyantsev | Union of Right Forces | 8,449 | 2.55% |
| Galina Mefed | Yabloko | 7,862 | 2.37% |
| Sergey Selivanov | Great Russia – Eurasian Union | 4,285 | 1.29% |
| Kirill Monastyrsky | United Russian Party Rus' | 3,234 | 0.98% |
| against all | | 62,637 | 18.89% |
| Total | | 331,876 | 100% |
