= November Chuvash Rebellion =

- Part of Russo-Ukrainian War
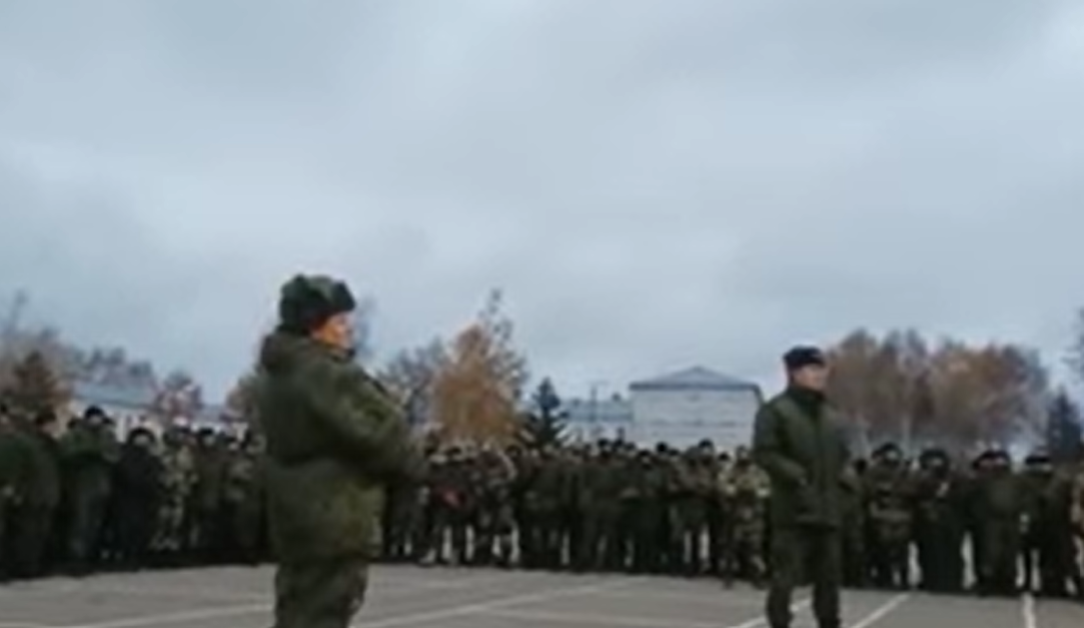
Date	November 1, 2022
Location	Tukhachevsky Street, Ulyanovsk Region, Russian Federation
Result	Money paid to the Chuvash protestors

Belligerents
Chuvash mobilized protestors	OMON National Guard of Russia

Strength
100+	unknown

The November Chuvash Rebellion or Rebellion Of The Mobilized Chuvashs was a mutiny of ethnic Chuvashs during the Russo-Ukrainian War. It happened on 1 November 2022 when about 100 mobilized Chuvash men refused to go to war and staged an action of disobedience at the training center.

== Mutiny ==
Russia's propaganda campaign during the war in Ukraine included the payment of 195.000 Rubles to each mobilized soldier. When a group of 100 Chuvash soldiers approached the question of payment they were given excuses, which caused an outrage among the soldiers. Following this the soldiers staged an act of disobedience and chaos at the training camp. Yelling "Один за всех и одного" and "Хамǎр Ял" in their native Chuvash language. The soldiers were unarmed, however despite that the OMON and ROS Guards were deployed in order to put down the mutiny. No one has been killed.

== Result ==
After a brief mutiny, the Head of the Chuvash Republic, Oleg Nikolayev responded to the rebels' demands by announcing that 400 million rubles will be given to the Chuvash soldiers; however, The Minister Of Finances Of The Chuvash Republic announced that only 100 million rubles were available. On 2 November 2022 Vladimir Putin had signed a "Decree of the President of the Russian Federation N 787" which was supposed to pay the promised 195.000 rubles to each Soldier. The story had been covered in many large Russian news channels like GTRK Chuvashia.

== See also ==
- Chuvashia
- Russo-Ukrainian War
- Oleg Nikolaev

== Citations ==
1. https://www.currenttime.tv/a/mobilizovannyh-iz-chuvashii-ustroili-bunt/32112062.html
2. https://www.youtube.com/watch?v=TQ9xu4eOVMk
3. https://base.garant.ru/405603317/
