= Anatoly Tyazhlov =

Russian politician (1942–2008)

- Анатолий Тяжлов
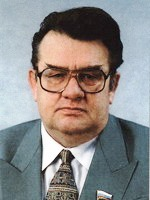

Member of the State Duma
- In office 18 January 2000 – 11 December 2003

1st Governor of Moscow Oblast
- In office 16 October 1991 – 19 November 1999
- Preceded by: Office established
- Succeeded by: Vasily Golubev (acting); Boris Gromov

Personal details
- Born: 11 October 1942 Kopeysk, Chelyabinsk Oblast, RSFSR, Soviet Union
- Died: 28 July 2008 (aged 65) Nikiforovskoye, Odintsovsky District, Moscow Oblast, Russia
- Party: Fatherland – All Russia (1999–2003)
- Other political affiliations: Our Home – Russia (1995–99)
- Education: Chelyabinsk Polytechnic Institute
- Awards

Anatoly Stepanovich Tyazhlov (Russian: Анатолий Степанович Тяжлов; October 11, 1942 – July 28, 2008) was a Russian politician who served as the member of the State Duma from 2000 to 2003.

He also served as the first Governor of Moscow Oblast from 1991 to 1999.

== Biography ==
Tyazhlov was born in the city of Kopeysk in the South Ural. Before entering politics, he worked in construction organizations in the Chelyabinsk, Orenburg and Moscow regions. He graduated from the Chelyabinsk Polytechnic Institute in 1964. From 1959 to 1969 he worked as a fitter at the Kopeysk Coal trust, as a bricklayer at the Chelyabinsk Civil Construction trust, then as a foreman, technologist, shop manager, head of department, chief engineer of the Orenburg precast concrete plant.

Until August 1991 he was a member of the CPSU. In 1990–91 — Chairman of the executive committee of the Moscow Regional Council. On 16 October 1991, by decree of the President of Russia Boris Yeltsin, Tyazhlov was appointed Head of Administration of Moscow Oblast. On 17 December 1995, he was elected Governor of Moscow Oblast. Tyazhlov was politically close to Boris Yeltsin, Viktor Chernomyrdin and Yury Luzhkov, and he supported the integration between Moscow City and Moscow Oblast.

In 1993 he was elected as a deputy of the first Federation Council (1994–96). In 1996–99 he was an ex officio member of the second Federation Council. On 19 December 1999, at the second gubernatorial elections, he came fourth (13% of the vote) and dropped out of the race. Tyazhlov also ran for the 3rd State Duma from the Fatherland – All Russia bloc and became one of the deputies of the lower house (1999–2003).

He died on July 28, 2008, at the age of 65.
