= Ivan Indinok =

Russian politician (1938–2025)

- Иван Индинок
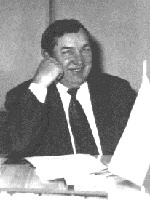

2nd Head of Administration of Novosibirsk Oblast
- In office 5 October 1993 – 13 December 1995
- Preceded by: Vitaly Mukha
- Succeeded by: Vitaly Mukha

1st Mayor of Novosibirsk
- In office 26 November 1991 – 5 October 1993
- Succeeded by: Viktor Tolokonsky

Personal details
- Born: Ivan Ivanovich Indinok; 6 August 1938; Kozlovka, Krasnoyarsk Krai, Russian SFSR, USSR
- Died: 14 June 2025 (aged 86)
- Political party: Our Home - Russia
- Parent: Ivan Stepanovich Indinok (father)

Ivan Ivanovich Indinok (Russian: Иван Иванович Индинок; 6 August 1938 – 14 June 2025) was a Russian politician who served as the second Head of Administration of Novosibirsk Oblast from 1993 to 1995. He also served as the Head of Novosibirsk from 1991 to 1993.

== Background ==
- Ivan Indinok was born in Kozlovka, in Krasnoyarsk Krai on 6 August 1938.
- He graduated from Tomsk Polytechnic Institute in 1962.
- He held various engineering positions at the enterprises of the military-industrial complex in Novosibirsk since 1962. From 1972 to 1981, he was a senior engineer, the head of the laboratory, and secretary of the party committee of NPO Vostok.
- Indinok died on 14 June 2025, at the age of 86.

=== Political activity ===
- From 1981 to 1988, he was the second, then the first secretary of the Zayeltsovsky district committee of the CPSU, the second secretary of the Novosibirsk city party committee. In 1988 he was elected chairman of the executive committee of the Novosibirsk City Council. In April 1990, Indinok was replaced by Oleg Semchenko. From 1988 to 1990, he headed the Association of Siberian and Far Eastern Cities. On 26 December 1991, Indinok was appointed 1st head of the administration of Novosibirsk
- On 5 October 1993, after the violent dispersal of the Congress of People's Deputies and the Supreme Soviet of Russia, Indinok was appointed 2nd Head of Administration of Novosibirsk Oblast, replacing Vitaly Mukha, who was removed for support of the Supreme Soviet.
- In December 1993, he was elected to the Federation Council of the first convocation, and was a member of the Committee on Federation Affairs, and the Federal Treaty and Regional Policy.
- In the first election of the governor of the Novosibirsk Oblast in December 1995, Indinok took first place in the first round (22.81% of the vote), in the second round he lost to his predecessor Mukha.
- From 1997, Indinok was a member of the Political Council of the Our Home – Russia party, and in the same year, he initiated the creation of an interregional public organization "Siberian Party" and was the chairman of its Supreme Council until March 1998.
- Until his death, he was the president of the "Light a Candle" humanitarian and educational club (Novosibirsk), and the chairman of the public council of the Main Directorate of the Ministry of Internal Affairs of Russia for the Siberian Federal District. Indinok was an Honorary resident of Novosibirsk.

== Awards ==
- Commemorative sign "For work for the benefit of the city" (Novosibirsk, 2013).
