= Tyagunov =

Tyagunov (masculine, Russian: Тягунов) or Tyagunova (feminine, Russian: Тягунова) is a Russian surname. Notable people with the surname include:

- Alexander Tyagunov (1940-2025), Russian politician
- Ivan Tyagunov (1898-1967), Soviet Russian World War II general
- Nikita Tyagunov (1953-1992), Soviet Russian film and theatrical director
