= Alexander Tyagunov =

Russian politician (1940–2025)

- Александр Тягунов
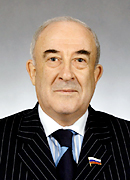

Member of the State Duma
- In office 17 December 1995 – 24 December 1999
- In office 29 December 2003 – 21 December 2011

Personal details
- Born: Alexander Alexandrovich Tyagunov; 31 May 1940 Kalinin, Russian SFSR, USSR
- Died: 3 October 2025 (aged 85)
- Party: United Russia
- Other political affiliations: Our Home – Russia
- Education: Tver State Technical University (DS, CS)

Alexander Alexandrovich Tyagunov (Russian: Александр Александрович Тягунов; 31 May 1940 – 3 October 2025) was a Russian politician. A member of United Russia, he served in the State Duma from 1995 to 1999 and again from 2003 to 2011.

Tyagunov died on 3 October 2025, at the age of 85.
