= Vladimir Suslov (politician) =

Russian politician

- Владимир Суслов
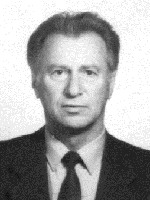

Head of Administration of Tver Oblast
- In office 20 October 1991 – 26 December 1995
- Preceded by: Office established
- Succeeded by: Vladimir Platov (as governor)

11th Chairman of Kalinin Oblast/Tver Oblast Executive Committee
- In office 10 July 1987 – October 1991
- Preceded by: Alexander Ilyenkov
- Succeeded by: Office abolished

Personal details
- Born: Vladimir Antonovich Suslov; 21 November 1939 (age 86) Sverdlovsk, RSFSR, Soviet Union
- Education: Ural State Technical University
- Awards: Order of the Red Banner of Labour Order of the Badge of Honour

Vladimir Antonovich Suslov (Russian: Владимир Антонович Суслов, born 21 November 1939) is a Soviet and Russian politician, who served as the Head of Administration of Tver Oblast in 1991–95.

== Biography ==
Born on 21 November 1939 in Sverdlovsk. He graduated from the Ural Polytechnic Institute with a degree in mechanical engineering. He also studied at the Academy of Social Sciences of the CPSU Central Committee. Suslov began his labor activity as a worker at the lapidary factory "Ural Gems" in Sverdlovsk. From 1963 he worked as an engineer at a woodworking plant in the town of Kimry. He was an activist of the Communist Youth League (Komsomol), heading its regional committee. first secretary of the Kimrsky District committee, and later Kalinin city committee of the Communist Party.

From 1987 to 1991 Vladimir Suslov was the Chairman of the executive committee of Kalinin Oblast. During his tenure, the city of Kalinin retained its historical name, Tver, and Kalinin Oblast was renamed Tver Oblast. In October 1991, Suslov was appointed head of administration of Tver Oblast. In December 1993, he was elected to the first Federation Council, was a member of the Committee on Budget. In December 1995, he lost the gubernatorial elections to Vladimir Platov. Suslov received 35.16% of the vote.

From 1996 to 2006 Suslov was the head of the Tver city post office. From 2007 — first deputy director of the Russian Post Tver Oblast branch.

== Awards ==
- Two Orders of the Red Banner of Labour
- Order of the Badge of Honour
- Order of Friendship (2020)
