= Workers' Movement for Social Guarantees "May" =

"May" Movement Движение «Май»
- Chairman: Alexander Burkov
- Founder: Anton Bakov
- Registered: April 17, 1999
- Dissolved: 2000–2004
- Headquarters: Yekaterinburg
- Ideology: Left-wing populism

The Workers' Movement for Social Guarantees "May" (Russian: Движение трудящихся за социальные гарантии «Май») or shortly "May" Movement was a social-populist regional political organization, operating in 1999–2000 in Sverdlovsk Oblast, Russia.

"May" was created by then-head of Serov metallurgic plant Anton Bakov. Member of the Legislative Assembly of Sverdlovsk Oblast Alexander Burkov was elected its chairman at the founding congress, which was held in Yekaterinburg on 17 April 1999. The creation the May movement was associated with the election of the governor of Sverdlovsk Oblast. The incumbent governor Eduard Rossel, his long-time opponent Arkady Chernetsky and Alexander Burkov fought for the chair of the head of the region.

== Alexander Burkov gubernatorial campaign ==
The movement was largely populist and in a situation of ongoing economic crisis, it gained points, becoming the epicenter of protest sentiment. Using gaps in the legislation, "May" activists actually seized the offices of mayors, forcing them to have a "dialog" about non-payment of salaries and pensions. "May" also organized a tent encampment under the building of the Sverdlovsk Oblast government, made by schoolteachers from a number of municipalities. Governor Rossel refused to sign a protocol promising payments and preferred to go to work through the service entrance for a month and a half.

The first round showed the success of the May's strategy: Arkady Chernetsky dropped out of the fight. However, the second round did not bring any surprises; Eduard Rossel was re-elected for a third term with 63.07% of the vote.

== 1999 federal election ==
The "Peace. Labour. May" electoral bloc was created by the "May" movement and the "Mining Ural" movement of Valery Trushnikov, deputy chairman of the Sverdlovsk Oblast Duma. It was registered by the Central Election Commission on 18 October 1999. An attempt of "May" to repeat the success and enter the federal politics failed. In the 1999 Russian legislative election the "Peace. Labour. May" bloc won 0.58% of the vote, taking 16th place out of 26. In the election of the Sverdlovsk Oblast Duma (26 March 2000) "May" gained 12.53% of the vote. Four years later, its successor, the Union of government employees of the Urals, led by Alexander Burkov, received 7.21% of the vote.
