= Tver State Technical University =

Public university in Tiver, Russia

- Тверской государственный технический университет
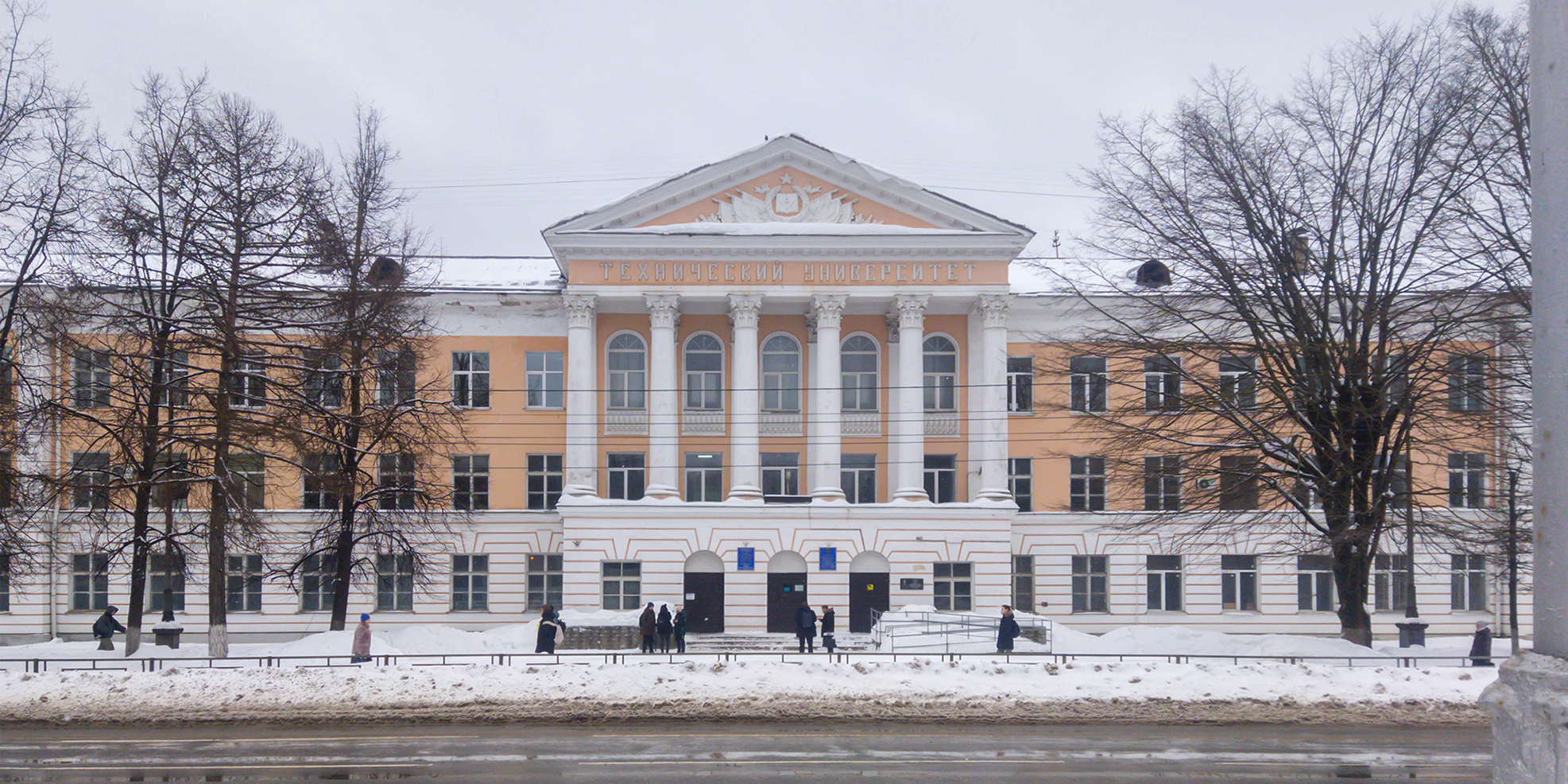
- Type: Public
- Established: 12 January 1922
- Location: Tver, Russia; 56°51′56″N 35°54′54″E
- Campus: Urban
- Nickname: TvGTU (Russian: ТвГТУ)
- Website: www.tstu.tver.ru

Tver State Technical University (Russian: Тверской государственный технический университет; abbreviated as TvSTU, previously known as Tver Polytechnic Institute until 1994) is a higher education institution in Tver, Tver Oblast, Russia.

Founded on January 12, 1922, it initially specialized in training specialists in the peat industry. In 1958, the institute was transferred from Moscow to Tver, and in 1994, it received university status. Currently, the university is housed in nine buildings and includes a computing center and a training ground.

== History ==
The university was founded in 1922 as the Moscow Peat Institute, but was soon merged with the Timiryazev Agricultural Academy and then transferred to the Moscow Mining Academy. In 1930, the university again became an independent educational institution—the Moscow Peat Institute. Initially, the institute had three departments: mining, technology, and mechanics. The main goal of the institute was to train specialists for the peat industry. In the 1930-1931 academic year, 191 students were enrolled at the institute. 38 faculty members, including 11 professors and 16 associate professors, worked in 23 departments at the institute.

By the beginning of the Great Patriotic War, the number of students had already reached 1,100. During the war, the institute was partially evacuated to Sverdlovsk; a sector was established in Moscow to fulfill defense contracts. Under the direction of Professor N. A. Nasedkin, tank maneuverability in swampy terrain was studied. Professor M. P. Volarovich investigated the optimal composition of lubricating oils to facilitate engine starting in low temperatures. Under the direction of Professor S. S. Dragunov, designs for peat-based heaters for soldiers were developed. During the war, a branch of the institute was opened in Orekhovo-Zuyevo. In 1943, the institute returned from evacuation to Moscow.

From 1930 to 1958, when the institute operated in Moscow, 3,949 engineers were trained in the fields of mechanics, technologists, hydraulic engineers, and railway engineers. Renowned scientists taught at the university, including Corresponding Member of the USSR Academy of Sciences V.V. Sokolovsky and Corresponding Member of the Byelorussian Academy of Sciences V.E. Rakovsky.

In 1958, institute was transferred to Kalinin and renamed the Kalinin Peat Institute. In 1965 the institute transformed from a specialized institute into a polytechnic and in accordance the decree of the Minister of Higher and Middle Specialized Education, Vsevolod Stoletov issued on 13 April 1965 was renamed Kalinin Polytechnical Institute.

In 1972, for its achievements in training engineering personnel and developing scientific research, and in connection with its 50th anniversary, the institute was awarded the Order of the Red Banner of Labour.

In 2023, the university ranked 33rd in Russia in the RUR Subject Rankings 2023.
