= Vladimir Yelagin =

Russian politician (born 1955)

- Владимир Елагин
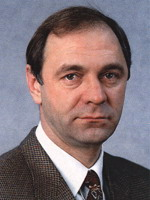
- Official portrait, 2008

Minister of State for social and economic development of the Republic of Chechnya
- In office 28 November 2000 – 2002
- Prime Minister: Mikhail Kasyanov
- Preceded by: Office established
- Succeeded by: Stanislav Ilyasov

Governor of Orenburg Oblast
- In office 24 October 1991 – 29 December 1999
- Succeeded by: Alexey Chernyshyov

Personal details
- Born: 20 April 1955 (age 71) Dobrinka, Alexandrovsky District, Orenburg Oblast, Russian SFSR, Soviet Union
- Party: Our Home Is Russia

Vladimir Vasilyevich Yelagin (Russian: Владимир Васильевич Елагин; born 20 April 1955) is a Russian politician, who served as governor and state minister without portfolio.

== Early life ==
Yelagin was born on 20 April 1955.

== Career ==
Yalegin is the former leader of Our Home Is Russia party. He worked as a construction official. He also served as the governor of the Orenburg Oblast. He was appointed to the post in October 1991 and won the election to the post on 17 December 1995. His tenure lasted until 1999.

Yalegin was appointed federal state minister for social and economic development of the republic of Chechnya on 28 November 2000. The office was established on the same date by president Vladimir Putin. In a cabinet reshuffle in Fall 2002, Yelagin was succeeded by Stanislav Ilyasov in the post. Yelagin was appointed minister without portfolio in the same reshuffle to the cabinet led by Mikhail Kasyanov.

After leaving cabinet post Yelagin became the chairman of the Jurby WaterTech International's supervisory board.
