= Pavel Gurkalov =

Russian politician (1939–2023)

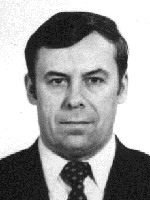

Member of the Federation Council of Russia
- In office 11 January 1994 – 23 January 1996

Personal details
- Born: Pavel Ivanovich Gurkalov; 15 February 1939 Tashla, Tyulgansky District, Chkalov Oblast, Russian SFSR, USSR
- Died: 8 June 2023 (aged 84)
- Education: Moscow State Open University

Pavel Ivanovich Gurkalov (Russian: Павел Иванович Гуркалов; 15 February 1939 – 8 June 2023) was a Russian politician. He served on the Federation Council from 1994 to 1996.

Gurkalov died on 8 June 2023, at the age of 84.
