= Damir Shadaev =

Russian politician

Damir Ravilevich Shadaev (Russian: Дамир Равильевич Шадаев; born November 3, 1967, in Leningrad, Russian SFSR) is a member of the State Duma of Russia. He is a member of the LDPR, and is Deputy Chairman of the State Duma's Committee on Natural Resources and Utilization. Previously, he was a Deputy in the Leningrad Oblast duma, and represented the region in the Federal Council. Shadaev has a degree from the North-West Academy of Government Services.

== Family ==
Married, father of six children. His wife, Irina Yevgenyevna Shadaeva (born in 1973), worked as a manager at Timberland-Vyborg JSC in the late 1990s. In September 2003, she was elected deputy of the Legislative Assembly of Leningrad Oblast of the third convocation, and in March 2007 — of the fourth convocation. A member of the LDPR, she is part of the LDPR faction in the Legislative Assembly.
