= Mikhail Ignatyev (politician) =

Former Head of Chuvash Republic (1962–2020)

- Михаил Игнатьев
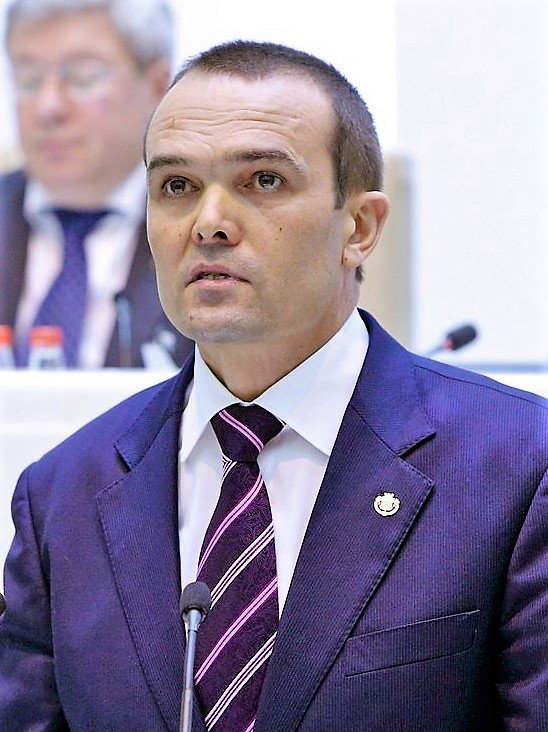
- Ignatyev in 2013

2nd Head of the Chuvash Republic
- In office 29 August 2010 – 29 January 2020
- Preceded by: Nikolay Fyodorov
- Succeeded by: Oleg Nikolayev

Personal details
- Born: 8 January 1962 Malye Torkhany, Chuvash ASSR, Russian SFSR, Soviet Union
- Died: 18 June 2020 (aged 58) Saint Petersburg, Russia
- Party: United Russia
- Education: Chuvash State University; Volga-Vyatka Academy of Public Administration

Mikhail Vasilyevich Ignatyev (Chuvash: Михал Ваçлин ывăл Йăкăнатьев, Mihal Vaślin yvӑl Jӑkӑnatjev; Russian: Михаи́л Васи́льевич Игна́тьев; 8 January 1962 – 18 June 2020) was a Russian politician who served as the Head of the Chuvashia from 2010 to 2020.

== Early life ==
Mikhail Vasilyevich Ignatyev was born on 8 January 1962, and graduated from Chuvash State University and Volga-Vyatka Academy of Public Administration.

== Career ==
=== Politics ===
From 1996 to 1999, Ignatyev served as the Deputy Minister of Agriculture and Food of Chuvashia. On 14 January 2002, he was appointed to replace Petr Ivantaev as First Deputy Chairman of the Cabinet of Ministers by President of Chuvashia Nikolay Fyodorov. On 6 May 2004, he became the Deputy Chairman of the Cabinet of Minister.

=== Head of Chuvash Republic ===
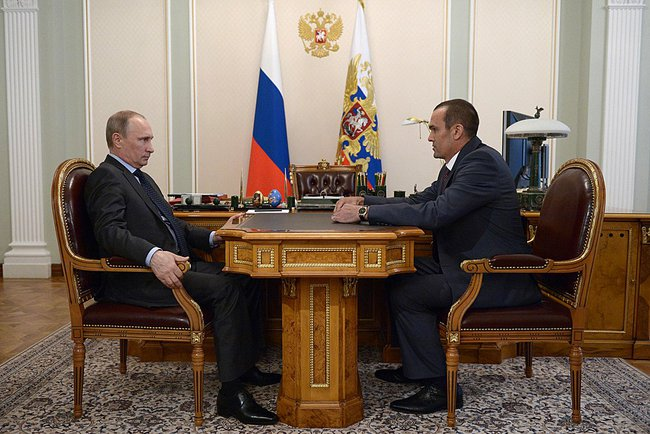
Mikhail Ignatyev with President Vladimir Putin

On 28 July 2010, Ignatyev was appointed by the State Council of the Chuvash Republic as President of the Chuvash Republic after being proposed by President Dmitry Medvedev. In the state council 37 deputies voted in favor, five against, and one abstained. He took office on 29 August.

On 1 January 2012, the title of the office was changed to Head of Chuvashia. On 9 June 2015, he was appointed acting head of the republic by President Vladimir Putin and was later elected to a second term with 65.54% of the popular vote on 13 September.

==== Dismissal ====
On 18 January 2020, Ignatyev called for the "wiping out" of journalists who criticize the government during a National Press Day speech.

On 23 January, Ignatyev participated in a review of the Cheboksary rescue equipment with Cheboksary's Emergency Response Department head and Chuvashia's civil defense minister. At a ceremony where the keys to multiple fire engines were presented Ignatyev forced a shorter emergency worker to jump multiple times for the keys.

On 28 January, Ignatyev was expelled from United Russia, and on 29 January, President Putin dismissed Ignatyev as Head of the Chuvash Republic and replaced him with Oleg Nikolayev as acting head.

== Later life ==
On 20 May 2020, Ignatyev filed a lawsuit against Putin with the Supreme Court of Russia for wrongful dismissal and his lawsuit was accepted on 21 May. The set hearings for the lawsuit were supposed to start on 30 June.

On 27 May, he was hospitalized due to bilateral pneumonia with a large amount of his lungs damaged. On 18 June, Ignatyev died in a Saint Petersburg hospital from heart failure after contracting COVID-19 during the COVID-19 pandemic in Russia.
