= Alexey Chernyshyov =

Russian politician (born 1939)

- Алексей Чернышёв
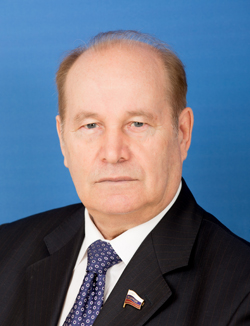

Senator from Orenburg Oblast
- In office 2010–2014

2nd Governor of Orenburg Oblast
- In office 29 December 1999 – 15 June 2010
- Preceded by: Vladimir Yelagin
- Succeeded by: Yury Berg

Member of the State Duma
- In office January 1994 – December 1999
- Constituency: Buzuluk

Personal details
- Born: 29 March 1939 (age 87) Rybkino, Novosergiyevsky District, Chkalov Oblast, RSFSR, Soviet Union
- Party: Agrarian Party of Russia; Communist Party; United Russia

Alexey Andreyevich Chernyshyov (Russian: Алексе́й Андре́евич Чернышёв; born 29 March 1939) is a Russian politician who served as the 2nd Governor of Orenburg Oblast, Russia. He is a member of the Agrarian Party of Russia. He became the head of the oblast government in 1999. Chernyshyov is active in promoting Russia-Kazakhstan trade as Orenburg Oblast shares a long border with Kazakhstan.
