= Leonid Polezhayev =

Russian politician

- Леонид Полежаев
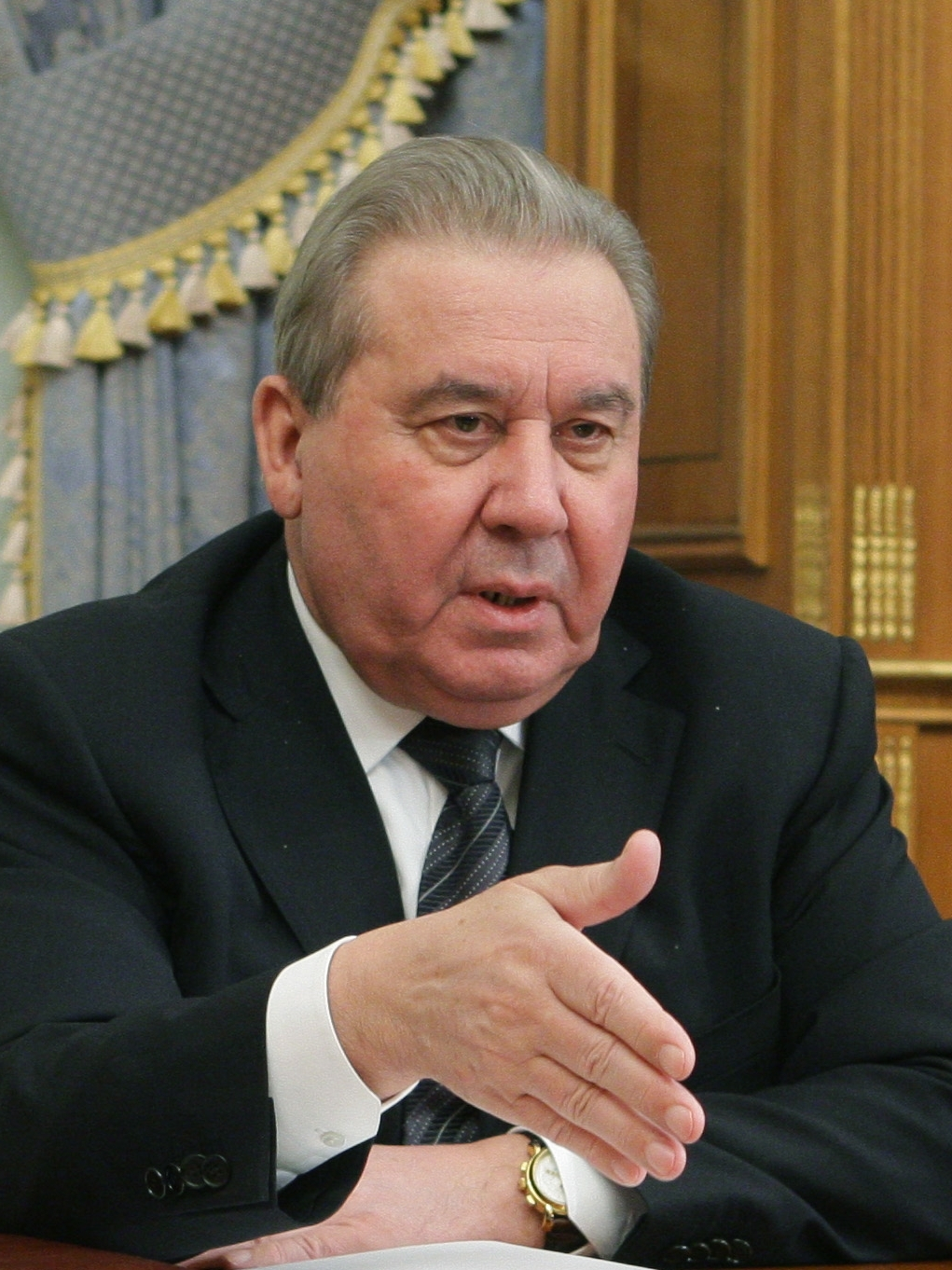
- Polezhayev in 2011

1st Governor of Omsk Oblast
- In office 17 December 1995 – 30 May 2012
- President: Boris Yeltsin, Vladimir Putin, Dmitry Medvedev
- Succeeded by: Viktor Nazarov

1st Head of Administration of Omsk Oblast
- In office 11 November 1991 – 17 December 1995
- President: Boris Yeltsin
- Succeeded by: Position abolished; himself as governor

14th Chairman of the Omsk Regional Executive Committee
- In office 31 March 1990 – 11 November 1991
- Preceded by: Anatoly Leontyev
- Succeeded by: Position abolished

Personal details
- Born: Leonid Konstantinovich Polezhayev; 30 January 1940 (age 86) Omsk, RSFSR, USSR
- Party: Communist Party of the Soviet Union→Our Home – Russia→United Russia
- Education: Omsk State Agrarian University
- Occupation: Hydraulic engineer

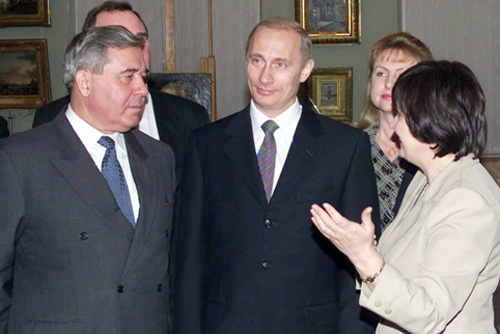
Leonid Polezhayev with Vladimir Putin in 2001

Leonid Konstantinovich Polezhayev (Russian: Леонид Константинович Полежаев; born 30 January 1940) is the former governor of Omsk Oblast. He is a hydro-engineer. In 1991 he became head of the administration of Omsk Oblast.

== Honours and awards ==
- Order "For Merit to the Fatherland";
  - 3rd class (30 January 2006) – for outstanding contribution to the socio-economic development of the field and many years of honest work
  - 4th class (11 December 2001) – for outstanding contribution to the socio-economic development of the field and many years of honest work
- Order of Honour (2 May 1996) – for services to the state and many years of diligent work
- Order of the Badge of Honour
- Order of the Red Banner of Labour
- Order of Friendship, 2nd class (Kazakhstan)
- Medal "For military cooperation" (Russian Federal Security Service, 2006)
- Medal "For promoting drug control bodies" (Federal Drug Control Service of Russia, 2007)
- Corresponding Member of the Russian Academy of Engineering Sciences
- Corresponding Member of the International Academy of Engineering Sciences
- Honorary Professor, Omsk State University
- Professor Emeritus of Omsk Academy of Interior Ministry
