= Alexander Burkov =

Russian politician (born 1967)

- Александр Бурков
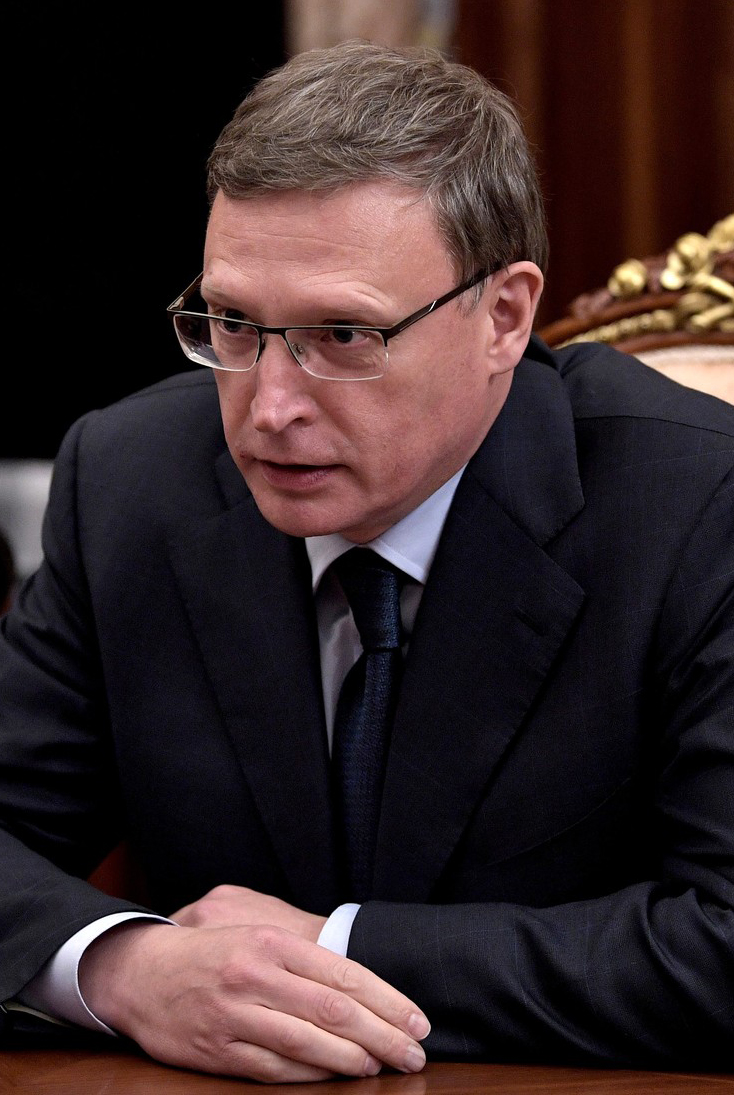
- Burkov in 2017

3rd Governor of Omsk Oblast
- In office 14 September 2018 – 29 March 2023
- Preceded by: Viktor Nazarov
- Succeeded by: Vitaliy Khotsenko

Personal details
- Born: 23 April 1967 (age 59) Kushva, Sverdlovsk Oblast, RSFSR, Soviet Union
- Party: A Just Russia — For Truth
- Education: Ural Polytechnic Institute

Alexander Leonidovich Burkov (Russian: Александр Леонидович Бурков; born 23 April 1967) is a Russian politician who served as governor of Omsk Oblast from 2017 to 2023. He is a member of the Central Council of A Just Russia party.

== Biography ==
Alexander Burkov was born in 1967 in Kushva in Middle Urals. He graduated from the Ural Polytechnic Institute in 1989. After graduating from the university, he became an employee of the tourist cooperative "Malakhit" (later East Line Group). It was founded by Anton Bakov, a graduate of the same institute. In the early 1990s, both Bakov and Burkov worked in Moscow at the Working Center for Economic Reforms under the Government of Russia.

=== Regional deputy ===
In 1994 Burkov was elected a deputy of the Sverdlovsk Oblast Duma from the Party of Russian Unity and Accord. In 1995, he was appointed chairman of the Committee for State Property Management of the regional administration. In 1998 he was elected a deputy of the House of Representatives of the newly established bicameral Legislative Assembly. In the same year he was elected chairman of the public organization "Industrial Parliament of Sverdlovsk Oblast." In April 1999, Burkov was elected chairman of the regional Council of the Workers' Movement for Social Guarantees "May" created by Anton Bakov.

In 1999 Burkov ran for the governor of Sverdlovsk Oblast. In the first round he left behind the mayor of Yekaterinburg Arkady Chernetsky, who was expected to take the second place. In the second round Burkov lost to the incumbent governor Eduard Rossel. In October, the "May" movement was reformed into the "Peace, Labour, May" electoral bloc, which received 0.57% of the vote in the 1999 Russian legislative election. In 2000, Burkov became a deputy of the Sverdlovsk Oblast Duma (lower house of the Legislative Assembly) by May's party list.

By 2003, Anton Bakov ceased to play the role of Burkov's "political patron": Bakov became one of the key political strategists of the Union of Right Forces, while Burkov continued his activities on the left side of political spectre. He headed the "Union of government employees of the Urals" in the 2004 elections to Oblast Duma.

=== Federal deputy ===
Burkov joined A Just Russia party in 2007 and was appointed Secretary of the Council of its regional branch in Sverdlovsk Oblast. On 2 December 2007, he was elected deputy of the 5th State Duma. After Yevgeny Roizman left A Just Russia, Burkov became chairman of the party's regional branch. In April 2011, at the 5th Congress of A Just Russia, he was elected to the presidium of the party's central council.

On 14 March 2010, A Just Russia took third place in the election to the Sverdlovsk Oblast Duma, gaining 19.30% of the vote. This was the best result of A Just Russia in 2010 regional elections. On 4 December 2011 A Just Russia came second in the election to the reformed Legislative Assembly of Sverdlovsk Oblast with 27.3% of the vote.

In 2013 Burkov ran for the mayor of Yekaterinburg. Two his namesakes were also registered: Alexander Vladimirovich Burkov from the Communist Party of Social Justice and Anton Leonidovich Burkov from the "Labor Party". Anton Bakov's daughter Anastasia also campaigned with the slogan "Do you know that the mayor has no rights?", referring to the 2010 reform, which introduced the city managers in Russia, making the office of Mayor almost ceremonial. Burkov came third in the race, surpassed by Yakov Silin of United Russia and Yevgeny Roizman of the Civic Platform.

=== Governor ===
On 9 October 2017, Alexander Burkov was appointed acting Governor of Omsk Oblast. After Burkov's appointment, information appeared in the media about his brother Viktor's conviction for a bribe. According to media reports, a criminal case was opened to put pressure on Alexander, who ran for the mayor of Yekaterinburg. Alexander Burkov called his brother's case fabricated. On 10 September 2018, he won the gubernatorial elections with 82.56% of the vote. On 29 March 2023 he resigned and was replaced by Vitaly Khotsenko.

=== Sanctions ===
He was sanctioned by the UK government in 2022 in relation to the Russo-Ukrainian War.

== Awards ==
- Medal of the Order "For Merit to the Fatherland", II degree (2013)
- Order of Friendship, II degree (Kazakhstan, 2022)
