= Head of the Chuvash Republic =

Highest-ranking official in Chuvashia, Russia

- Чӑваш Республикин Пуҫлӑхӗ (Chuvash); Глава Чувашской Республики (Russian)
- Flag of the Head of the Republic

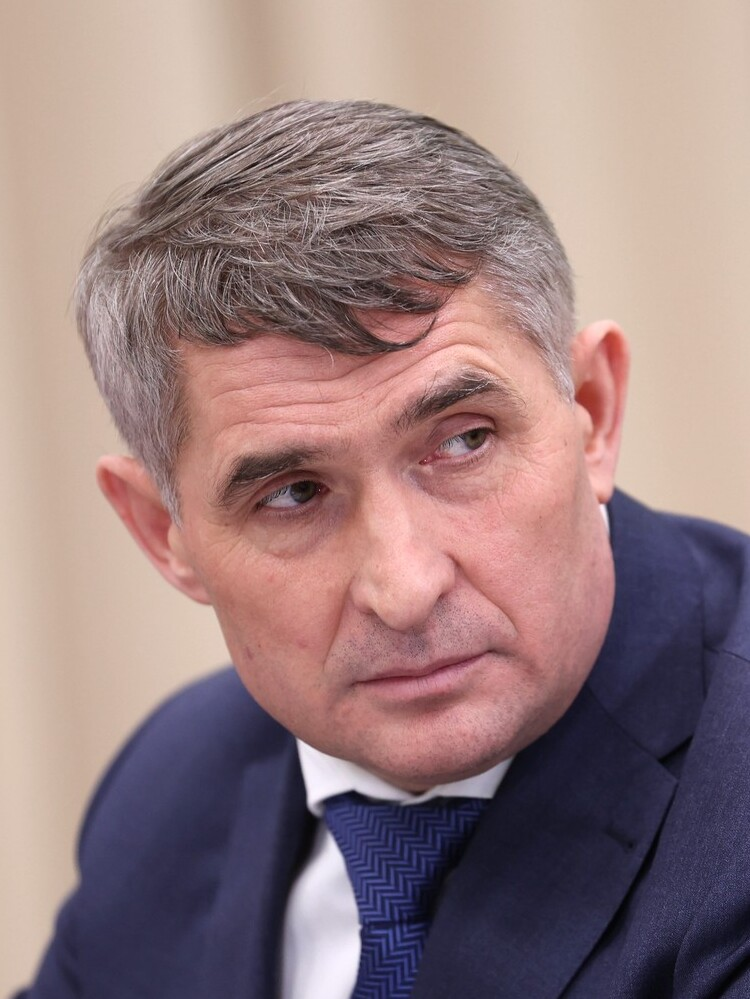
- Incumbent; Oleg Nikolayev since 29 January 2020
- Executive branch of the Chuvash Republic
- Style: His Excellency; Sir (informal)
- Type: Governor; Head of state; Head of government
- Residence: Cheboksary
- Term length: 5 years
- Precursor: First Secretary of the Chuvash Communist Party
- Formation: 21 January 1994
- First holder: Nikolay Fyodorov
- Website: glava.cap.ru

The position of the Head of the Chuvash Republic, (Note: Russian: Глава Чувашской Республики, romanized: Glava Chuvashskoy Respubliki; Chuvash: Чӑваш Республикин Пуҫлӑхӗ, romanized: Çăvaş Respublikin Puşlăhĕ) (formerly the President of the Chuvash Republic (Note: Russian: Президент Чувашской Республики, romanized: Prezident Chuvashskoy Respubliki; Chuvash: Чӑваш Республикин Президенчӗ, romanized: Çăvaş Respublikin Prezidençĕ) until 2011), is the highest office within the Government of the Chuvash Republic in Russia. The Head is elected directly by the people. Term of service is five years.

== List of officeholders ==
No.	Portrait	Name (born–died)	Term of office			Political party	Election	Ref.
No.	Portrait	Name (born–died)	Took office	Left office	Time in office	Political party	Election	Ref.
1		Nikolay Fyodorov (born 1958)	21 January 1994	29 August 2010	18 years, 221 days	Independent	1993; 1997; 2001	
1		Nikolay Fyodorov (born 1958)	21 January 1994	29 August 2010	18 years, 221 days	United Russia	2005 (Note: Appointed by the President of Russia with the consent of the State Council.)	
2		Mikhail Ignatyev (1962–2020)	29 August 2010	9 June 2015	4 years, 284 days	United Russia	2010	
–		Mikhail Ignatyev (1962–2020)	9 June 2015	21 September 2015	104 days	United Russia	— (Note: Acting.)	
(2)		Mikhail Ignatyev (1962–2020)	21 September 2015	29 January 2020	4 years, 130 days	United Russia	2015	
–		Oleg Nikolayev (born 1969)	29 January 2020	22 September 2020	237 days	A Just Russia	—	
3		Oleg Nikolayev (born 1969)	22 September 2020	Incumbent	5 years, 350 days	A Just Russia	2020; 2025	

The latest election for the office was held on 14 September 2025.
