= Vladimir Platov =

Russian politician (1946–2012)

- Владимир Платов
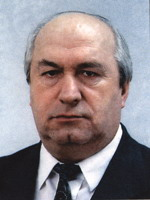

Governor of Tver Oblast
- In office 26 December 1995 – 30 December 2003
- Preceded by: Vladimir Suslov
- Succeeded by: Dmitry Zelenin

Personal details
- Born: 23 October 1946 Ovechkino, Sobinsky District, Vladimir Oblast, RSFSR, Soviet Union
- Died: 16 April 2012 (aged 65) Vladimir, Russia

Vladimir Ignatyevich Platov (Russian: Владимир Игнатьевич Платов; 23 October 1946 – 16 April 2012) was a Russian politician, who served as governor of Tver Oblast from 1995 to 2003.

== Biography ==
Platov was born in 1946 in Ovechkino, Sobinsky District, central Russia, to a family of shepherds. He had a brother and two sisters. He graduated from the Vladimir Aviation Technical School in 1967. He began his career at Bezhetskselmash, an agricultural equipment plant in Bezhetsk. From 1987 to 1992 he was director of that plant.

Until 1990 Platov was a member of the Soviet Communist Party. From 1992 to 1995 he was the head of administration of Bezhetsk and Bezhetsky District. In December 1995, he won the first gubernatorial election in Tver Oblast, gaining 50.5% of the vote cast. He took office on December 26. From January 1996 to May 2001, he was ex officio member of the Federation Council of Russia.

In 1999–2000 election, Platov narrowly defeated Communist Vladimir Bayunov and won his second four-year term. At the same time he acted as a "locomotive" candidate for Unity party in 1999 legislative election (locomotive here means a locally or countrywide known person who runs for seat in parliament only to attract votes for specific party).

In September 2003, Platov and his deputy Alexander Kotlyar were charged with abuse of office, "resulting in significant damage to the regional budget" estimated at 463 million rubles. Such circumstances have toppled Platov's re-election campaign. He won 12% of the vote in the 1st round and dropped out of the race. Two years after, in November 2005, the Tagansky District Court of Moscow found Platov and Kotlyar guilty and sentenced them to five and four years in prison respectively. The former governor was released from prison in 2006. Vladimir Platov died in Vladimir in 2012 after a long illness. He was married and had two sons.
