= Vitaly Mukha =

Russian politician

- Виталий Муха
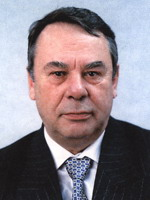

Governor of Novosibirsk Oblast
- In office 30 December 1995 – 14 January 2000
- Preceded by: Ivan Indinok
- Succeeded by: Viktor Tolokonsky

Head of Administration of Novosibirsk Oblast
- In office 26 November 1991 – 5 October 1993
- Preceded by: Office established
- Succeeded by: Ivan Indinok

14th First Secretary of the Novosibirsk Regional Committee of the CPSU
- In office 30 October 1989 – 12 August 1991
- Preceded by: Vladimir Kazarezov
- Succeeded by: Vladimir Poleshchuk (acting)

Personal details
- Born: Vitaly Petrovich Mukha; 17 May 1936 Kharkiv, Ukrainian SSR, Soviet Union
- Died: 22 May 2005 (aged 69) Kudryashovsky, Novosibirsky District, Novosibirsk Oblast, Russia
- Education: Kharkov Aviation Institute
- Awards: Order of the Red Banner of Labour

Vitaly Petrovich Mukha (Russian: Виталий Петрович Муха; 17 May 1936 — 22 May 2005) was a Ukrainian-born Russian politician, who served as the first and third Governor of Novosibirsk Oblast from 1991 to 1993 and from 1995 to 2000.

He also served as the 14th first secretary of the Novosibirsk regional committee of the CPSU from 1989 to 1990.

== Biography ==
Vitaly Mukha was born in Kharkiv to a Ukrainian family.

=== Education and work ===
In 1960, he graduated from the Kharkiv Aviation Institute with a degree in mechanical engineer, associate professor. From 1960 to 1966 he was a foreman, deputy head of the shop, head of the shop of the V.P. Chkalov Novosibirsk Aviation Plant, since 1966 — head of department, deputy chief engineer, chief engineer, since 1973 — director of the Novosibirsk plant of electrothermal equipment at PA Sibelektroterm.

From 1975 to 1982, he was the director of the plant and general director of PA "Sibelektroterm". From 1982 to 1988, he was promoted to general director of PA "Sibselmash".

In 1963, Mukha joined the Communist Party. In December 1988, Mukha started as the Second Secretary of the Novosibirsk Regional Committee of the CPSU. Vladimir Kazarezov, who offered him this post, did not expect that Mukha would agree to leave the post of general director, where he received a salary of 1,200 rubles, to the post of second secretary with a salary of 520 rubles, but Mukha agreed. When he was appointed, problems arose, since he divorced his first wife, and had not yet formalized the relationship with the second. Kazarezov, who highly appreciated Mukha as the organizer of production, achieved his approval by contacting the Secretary of the CPSU Central Committee, Georgy Razumovsky.

On 30 October 1989, Mukha was promoted to the First Secretary of the Novosibirsk Regional Committee of the CPSU.

Since April 1990, after being elected to leading positions in the regional council, he combined the positions of the chairman of the regional council of people's deputies and the first secretary of the regional party committee, until August 1990. In August 1990, the 24th regional conference of the CPSU prohibited combining the posts of Soviet and party leaders and removed Mukha from the office of the first secretary. The second secretary Vladimir Poleshchuk was appointed to this position. He was a delegate to the 19th Party Conference (1988) and the 28th Congress of the CPSU (1990), a member of the Central Committee of the CPSU (1990-1991).

From 1990 to 1993, Mukha was the People's Deputy of Russia in the Chulym constituency No. 533 in the Novosibirsk Oblast. At the 1st Congress of People's Deputies of the RSFSR, he was a member of the deputy group "Communists of Russia", starting from the 2nd Congress he was not a member of any factions and blocs. During the August coup of 1991, he called on the population of Novosibirsk Oblast to be guided by the provisions of the Constitution of the USSR and not to give in to the calls of the President of the RSFSR, Boris Yeltsin for a general strike. On 26 November 1991, by decree of the President of the RSFSR, Mukha was appointed 1st Head of Administration of Novosibirsk Oblast.

In September 1993, Mukha was one of the organizers of the all-Siberian meeting of representatives of local councils, which put forward demands to Yeltsin to lift the blockade from the building of the Supreme Soviet of Russia in Moscow under the threat of blocking the Trans-Siberian Railway. After the dispersal of the Congress of People's Deputies and the Supreme Soviet in October 1993, he was removed from the post of head of the administration. At the same year, Mukha became the chairman of the Board of Directors of TransSibAvia, Chairman of the Board of Directors and Vice President of Levoberezhny Bank in Novosibirsk.

On 4 December 1995, in the second round of elections, Mukha was elected 3rd governor of Novosibirsk Oblast, defeating Ivan Indinok.

Since January 1996, he was a member of the Federation Council of the Russian Federation, and a member of the Committee on Economic Policy. On 19 December 1999, Mukha took third place in the first round of the elections, with 18% of the votes, and dropped out of the further struggle. From February 1992 to October 1993 and from December 15, 1996 he was the chairman of the Council of the Interregional Association "Siberian Agreement".

He died on May 22, 2005 in the village of Kudryashovsky from a heart attack. He was buried on May 24 at the Zayeltsovskoye Cemetery in Novosibirsk.

He was married twice, had three sons and a daughter, and grandchildren.

== Awards and titles ==
- Order of Honour (May 17, 1996) — for services to the state and long-term conscientious work;
- Order of the Red Banner of Labour;
- Medal "For Civil Merit" (November 29, 1999, Moldova) — for merits in the development of cooperation and strengthening friendship between the peoples of the Republic of Moldova and the Russian Federation, active charitable activities and significant contribution to the construction, reconstruction and restoration of monuments dedicated to important historical events;
- Full member of the Housing and Communal Services Academy of the Russian Federation.
