= Vladimir Bayunov =

Russian politician (1952–2026)

- Владимир Баюнов
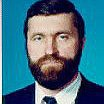
- Official portrait, 1993

Member of the State Duma for Bezhetsk
- In office 12 December 1993 – 19 December 1999
- Preceded by: Office established
- Succeeded by: Vyacheslav Zorkin

Personal details
- Born: 31 July 1952 Klimotino, Kalinin Oblast, Russian SFSR, Soviet Union
- Died: 1 May 2026 (aged 73) Bezhetsk, Tver Oblast, Russia
- Party: CPRF
- Education: Kalinin Agricultural Institute; Russian Academy of State Service
- Occupation: Engineer; politician

Vladimir Aleksandrovich Bayunov (Russian: Владимир Александрович Баюнов; 31 July 1952 – 1 May 2026) was a Russian engineer and politician. A member of the Communist Party of the Russian Federation, he served in the State Duma from 1993 to 1999.

Bayunov died in Bezhetsk on 1 May 2026, at the age of 73.
