= Nikolay Fyodorov (politician) =

Russian politician; former President of Chuvashia

- Николай Фёдоров
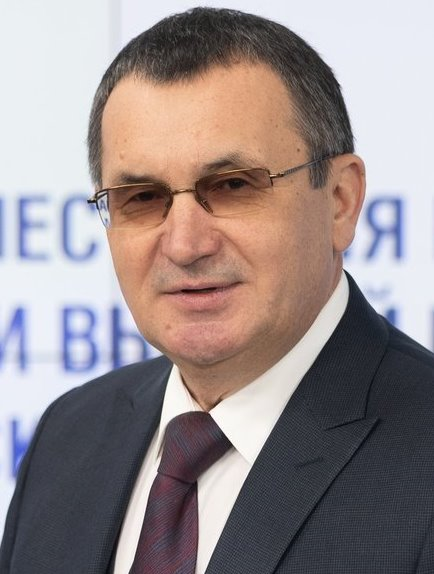
- Fyodorov in 2018

First Deputy Chairman of the Federation Council
- In office 30 September 2015 – 23 September 2020
- Chairman: Valentina Matviyenko

Russian Federation Senator from the Chuvash Republic
- Incumbent
- Assumed office 20 September 2015
- Preceded by: Konstantin Kosachev
- In office 22 September 2010 – 23 May 2012
- Preceded by: Vladimir Sloutsker
- Succeeded by: Galina Nikolayeva

Minister of Agriculture
- In office 21 May 2012 – 22 April 2015
- Premier: Dmitry Medvedev
- Preceded by: Yelena Skrynnik
- Succeeded by: Aleksandr Tkachyov

1st President of the Chuvash Republic
- In office 21 January 1994 – 29 August 2010
- Vice President: Enver Ablyakimov (1994–97), Lev Kurakov (1997–2000)
- Succeeded by: Mikhail Ignatyev

Minister of Justice
- In office 14 July 1990 – 24 March 1993
- President: Boris Yeltsin
- Preceded by: Vladimir Abolentsev (under RSFSR)
- Succeeded by: Yury Kalmykov

Personal details
- Born: 9 May 1958 (age 68) Chyodino, Chuvash ASSR, Russian SFSR, Soviet Union
- Party: United Russia
- Spouse: Svetlana Yuryevna Fyodorova
- Education: Kazan State University
- Awards: Alt text Order of Merit for the Chuvash Republic»

Nikolay Vasilyevich Fyodorov (Russian: Никола́й Васи́льевич Фёдоров, Chuvash: Фёдоров Николай Васильевич, Fyodorow Nikolay Wasilyewich; born 9 May 1958) is the First Deputy Chairman of the Federation Council. He is also the former president of the Chuvash Republic in Russia.

== Early life ==
Nikolai Fyodorov was born in 1958 in the village of Chyodino, Mariinsko-Posadsky District of the Chuvash ASSR (now part of Novocheboksarsk), into a large family of a WWII veteran. In 1980, after graduating from the law faculty of Kazan State University, he came to Cheboksary and taught the disciplines "Soviet law" and "Scientific communism" in 1980–82 and 1985–89 at the Chuvash State University.

== Career ==
=== Federal minister ===
In 1989 he was elected People's Deputy of the USSR. He was one of the leaders of the committee on legislation of the Supreme Soviet of the USSR. He was the Justice Minister of Russia from 14 July 1990 to 24 March 1993. In December 1991, Fyodorov stated that the 79-year-old former leader of the GDR Erich Honecker, who was in the Chilean embassy in Moscow, must leave the USSR territory (six months later, in July 1992, Honecker was extradited to Berlin). In March 1993, during the power struggle between the reformist cabinet and anti-reform legislature Fyodorov resigned protesting against the unconstitutional introduction of a "special procedure for governing" by Boris Yeltsin. Fyodorov critically assessed the dispersal of the Congress of People's Deputies and the Supreme Soviet of Russia in October 1993.

=== President of Chuvashia ===
In December 1993, he ran simultaneously to the 1st State Duma and for the president of Chuvashia, his home region. Fyodorov was elected to the State Duma on the list of the Democratic Party of Russia, became a member of the Defense Committee. In the Chuvash presidential elections, none of the candidates received the required 25% of the vote. Fyodorov with 24.9%, and Lev Kurakov, the rector of the Chuvash University, who gained 21.9%, entered the second round. On December 26, Fyodorov won the majority of the vote. On 21 January 1994, he took office as president of the Chuvash Republic, and in February he resigned as a State Duma deputy.

He was reelected in 1997 and 2001, and appointed by president Putin in 2005. As a head of the region, he was a member of the second Federation Council from 1996 to 2001. In December 2000, Fyodorov was the only senator who voted against the new law on the National Anthem of Russia, adopting Alexandrov's melody (lyrics by Sergey Mikhalkov were adopted later; Oleg Chirkunov was the only one voting against it).

He served as the first President of Chuvash Republic to 29 August 2010. He was a supporter of market reforms. Fyodorov opposed Russian President Boris Yeltsin's policies in Chechnya and Vladimir Putin's 2000 federal reform initiatives.

=== Post-presidency ===
On 8 September 2010, at the session of the State Council of Chuvashia, he was approved as a member of the Federation Council of Russia.

He had been the Minister of Agriculture from 21 May 2012 until April 2015. Two days after his appointment he sent a letter to Mikhail Ignatyev, who was his successor as the president of Chuvashia. Fyodorov criticized the economic policy of Ignatyev's administration. From April to September 2015 Fyodorov was an advisor to the president of Russia on agroindustrial complex issues.

In January 2014, Fyodorov arrived in Berlin for the Green Week agriculture exhibition on a business-class Cessna private jet, which was registered in Serbia. The photo of Fyodorov leaving the cabin was first retouched and then removed from the website of the Ministry of Agriculture. In March 2015 deputy chairman of the Committee on Agrarian Policy of the Chamber of Commerce and Industry Pavel Grudinin criticized Fyodorov's department for imposing transport tax on agricultural machinery operating in the fields, despite the fact that this transport is not intended to use the motorways.

After his resign from the federal cabinet Fyodorov was appointed a member of the Federation Council from Chuvashia for the second time. In 2015–2020 he was the First Deputy Chairman of the council.

=== Sanctions ===
He was sanctioned by the UK government in 2022 in relation to Russo-Ukrainian War.

== Personal life ==
He is an ethnic Chuvash. He is married and has one son and a daughter. His son Vasily is a lawyer. In addition to his native Chuvash, he speaks Russian and German.

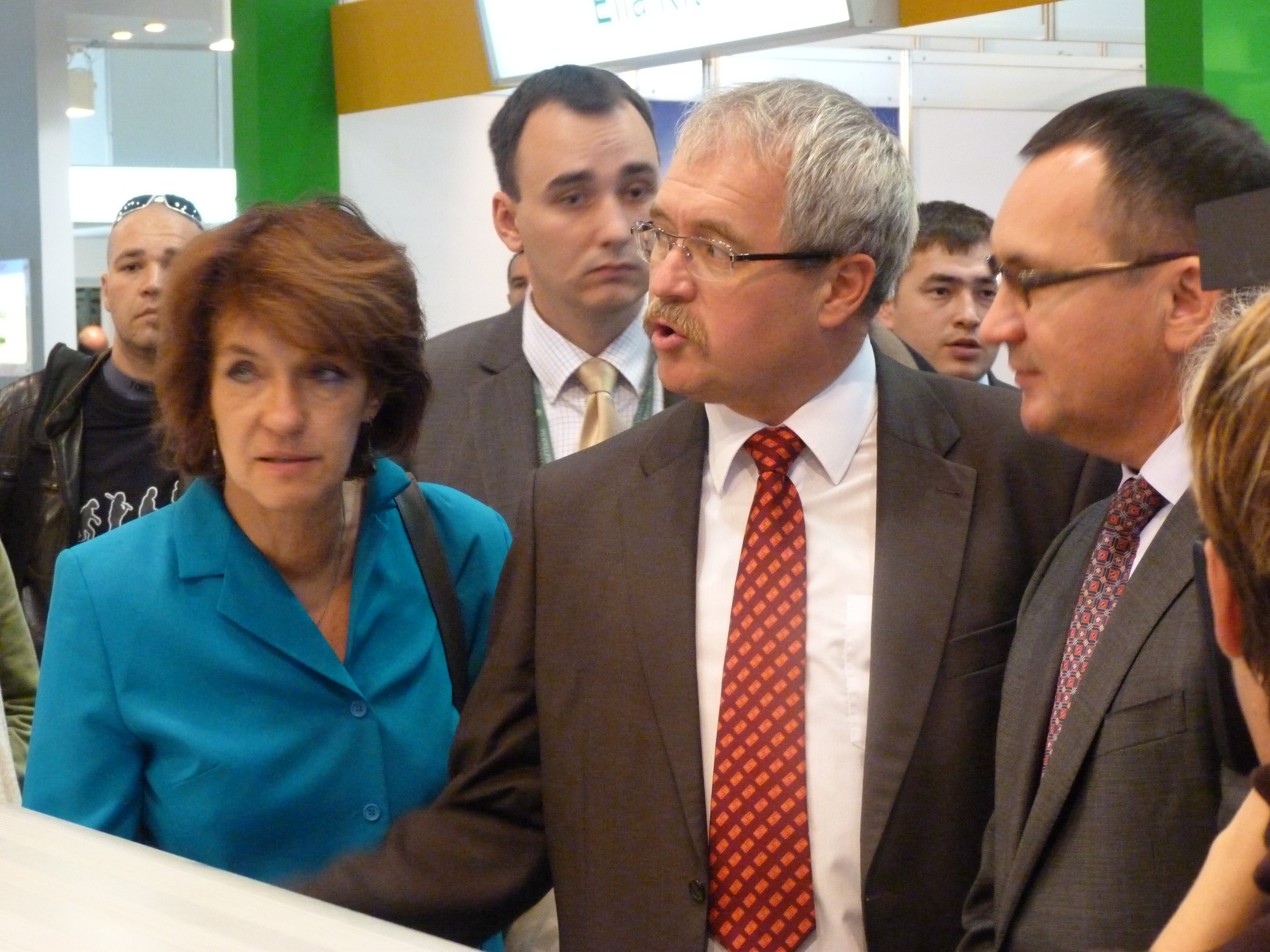
Fyodorov (right) with his Hungarian colleague Sándor Fazekas (center) - OMÉK, 2013

== Honours and awards ==
- Order of Merit for the Fatherland;
  - 3rd class (5 August 2003) — for outstanding contribution to strengthening Russian statehood and many years of diligent work
  - 4th class (9 May 1998) — for services to the state and a major contribution to socio-economic development of Chuvash Republic
- Order of Alexander Nevsky (2017) — for his great contribution to the development of Russian parliamentarism and legislative activity
- Order of Honour (11 September 2008) — for outstanding contribution to the socio-economic development of the long and fruitful work
- State Prize of the Russian Federation for science and technology, 1999 — for the revival of the historic part of the capital of Chuvashia — the city of Cheboksary
- Honorary Builder of the Russian Federation
- Medal "For Services to the national health care"
- Medal "75 years of civil defence"
- Order "For Services to the Chuvash Republic" (29 August 2010)
- Order of St. Sergius, 1st class
- Order of the Holy Prince Daniel of Moscow, 1st class
- Winner of the All-Russian legal award "Themis"
- Title of "President of the Year - 2001" All-Russia public premium "Russian National Olympus"
- Medal "In Commemoration of the 850th Anniversary of Moscow"
- Medal of Merit in the All-Russia Census
- Medal "In Commemoration of the 300th Anniversary of Saint Petersburg"
- Medal "In Commemoration of the 1000th Anniversary of Kazan"
- Medal in commemoration of the 200th anniversary of Russian Ministry of Justice
- Medal "200 Years of the Russian Interior Ministry"

== Footnotes ==
Political offices
Preceded by None	President of the Chuvash Republic; 21 January 1994 – 29 August 2010	Succeeded by Mikhail Ignatyev
