= Oleg Nikolayev (politician) =

Head of the Republic of Chuvashia

- Олег Николаев
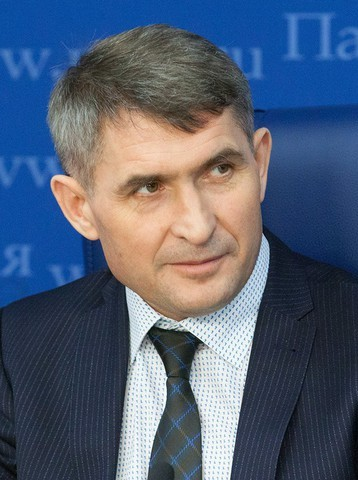
- Nikolayev in 2016

3rd Head of the Chuvash Republic
- Incumbent
- Assumed office 29 January 2020; Acting until 22 September 2020
- Preceded by: Mikhail Ignatyev

Chairman of the Committee for Nationalities Affairs of the State Duma of the VII convocation
- In office 22 January 2020 – 29 January 2020
- Preceded by: Ildar Gilmutdinov
- Succeeded by: Valery Gazzayev

Member of the State Duma
- In office 18 September 2016 – 29 January 2020

Personal details
- Born: Oleg Alekseyevich Nikolayev; 10 December 1969 (age 56) Cherbay, Russian SFSR, Soviet Union
- Party: A Just Russia (since 2007)

Oleg Alekseyevich Nikolayev (Russian: Олег Алексеевич Николаев; born on 10 December 1969), is a Russian statesman, politician, and economist who is currently the Head of the Chuvash Republic since 22 September 2020. He is the chairman of the Cabinet of Ministers of the Chuvash Republic since 6 February 2020, and a member of the Central Council of the A Just Russia party since 2020.

Nikolayev is a former member of the State Duma from 2016 to 2020. He was also the chairman of the State Duma Committee on Ethnic Affairs (from 22 January to 29 January 2020). He has been placed on the Specially Designated Nationals and Blocked Persons List by the United States.

== Biography ==
=== Origin ===
Oleg Nikolayev was born in Cherbay on 10 December 1969, into a Chuvash peasant family. His parents, Aleksey Timofeyevich and Valentina Fyodorovna, worked in the collective farm "Marksist" of the Krasnochetaysk region. Aleksey was the driver, and Valentina was an ordinary collective farmer. Oleg's younger sister is Lyudmila, and Slava is his brother. Aleksey died at the age of 30 from cardiac arrest on a flight in the fall of 1976, when Oleg began to attend the 1st grade. Valentina, who was left with three young children, died in the same year in December. Later, Oleg was brought up in the family of his mother's brother - Nikolay Grigoriev with his cousin, Nina Nikolayevna.

In the first grade, Oleg began to go to school located in the neighboring village of Yamany. During his school years, he went in for sports (he did daily morning jogging, they had weights and dumbbells in the house, which were in the house of his grandfather on his father's side), loved the Chuvash dance, read a lot, worked on the collective farm and in the collective farm yard. From the 5th grade, he began attending a school located in the neighboring village of Novye Atai. According to the Honored Teacher of the Chuvash Republic M. M. Volkova, her graduate Oleg Nikolaev "studied only with excellent marks." In the certificate of completion of the eight-year period there were two "fours" (including in German).

In rural areas, he grew up to the eighth grade. From 1985 to 1989 he studied at the Cheboksary Construction Technical School of the USSR Ministry of Construction, where he received a secondary technical education with a degree in industrial and civil engineering construction technician. During the summer holidays, he worked on the construction of a farm in the village.

In April 1989, he was hired as an erector of reinforced concrete structures in the SU-15 PSO Monolitstroy in Cheboksary. From May 1989 to May 1991 he served in the ranks of the Soviet army. In the army, he rose to the rank of senior sergeant, deputy platoon commander; received the specialty of radio mechanics of the landing beacon group of the 2nd class.

After demobilization, he returned to his native village and for some time with fellow villagers was engaged in the construction of houses in neighboring Mordovia.

=== Professional activity ===
From August 1991 to 1992, Nikolayev worked in Cheboksary as an assembler for the installation of steel and reinforced concrete structures in the SU-17 of the Monolitstroy Production and Construction Association. From 1992 to 1995 he worked at the Center for Security and Safety "Bodyguard LTD" LLP as a driver-bodyguard, at Tekstilmash OJSC as a security guard, at Voskhod-1 LLP (Urmarsky District) as a construction technician and since July 1995, he was Chief Accountant. He later moved to LLC PSF "Spetsvyazstroy" (Urmarsky district) as chief accountant. From 1996 to 2000, he worked as chief accountant, deputy director (since January 1997) in a construction and telecommunications company, CJSC Production and Construction Company Telefonstroy in Novocheboksarsk, in the creation of which he himself participated. (Note: Организация обеспечивала работой более ста человек)

In 1998, at the Chuvash State University named after I. N. Ulyanov, he received a diploma of higher education in the specialty "economic theory" (qualification "economist"). In 1999, at the same university, he took training courses under the Federal Program for the Training of Management Personnel, and completed a one-year internship in Germany as part of the presidential program "Restructuring the activities of industrial enterprises." After a year of internship, the German government announced a competition to test the knowledge gained. The Grant Commission awarded the first prize to the project, which was implemented by Nikolayev's company, ZAO PSF Telefonstroy: in the late 90s, all television reception systems were replaced with cable television on the basis of the equipment of a German company in Novocheboksarsk; in the city for the first time a network was built, which made it possible to divide frequencies and ensure the reception of a return signal. He received additional education under the Presidential Program for the training of management personnel for organizations of the national economy of Russia, (Note: См. Указ Президента Российской Федерации от 23 июля 1997 г. № 774) as well as in the Federal Service of Russia for Insolvency and Financial Recovery under a temporary standard training program for specialists in anti-crisis management in 1999.

In 2000, on the recommendation of the State Duma deputy Anatoly Aksakov, he headed LLC Small Business Leasing Company in Cheboksary, established by CJSC PSF Telefonstroy and the Republican Fund for Small Business Support of the Chuvash Republic, and worked as a director until 2002.

=== State and political activity in Chuvashia ===
In January 2002, on Aksakov's recommendation, (Note: Анатолий Аксаков до 2000 года был министром экономики Чувашии) Nikolayev was admitted to the civil service in the Cabinet of Ministers of the Chuvash Republic - the government of Natalia Partasova - the head of the Department for the Development of Entrepreneurial Activity of the Ministry of Economic Development and Trade. (Note: Непосредственными начальниками Олега Николаева были министр экономического развития и торговли (2002—2004) Марина Ивановна Илларионова и первый заместитель министра экономического развития и торговли Гульмира Тагаевна Акимова) Since January 2003, he also served as Deputy Minister of Economic Development and Trade. The ministry was supposed to deal with the creation of mechanisms for the development of small and medium-sized businesses, the consumer market, foreign economic relations and the development of folk crafts. Nikolayev held positions in the ministry until October 2004, after which he moved to the structure of the entrepreneur Vladimir Yermolayev - to OJSC Kontur in Cheboksary as Deputy General Director for Strategic Development.

In 2004, he returned to ZAO PSF Telefonstroy, where, until 2008, he worked as Deputy General Director, (Note: Генеральный директор ЗАО ПСФ «Телефонстрой» — Лисин Николай Анатольевич) and later worked in the construction company Alza LLC as Deputy Director for Economics and Finance. Until 2007, he was a member of the People's Party of the Russian Federation, which he joined on Aksakov's recommendation. (Note: Анатолий Аксаков в 2004—2007 годах — Первый Заместитель председателя Центрального комитета Народной партии Российской Федерации, председатель Чувашского регионального отделения партии) In 2007 he became a member of the political party "Fair Russia", which included the People's Party of the Russian Federation. From 2008 to 2009, he worked at the NGO Association of Regional Banks of Russia as Director of the Center for International Relations, as Vice President, and Director of the Center for International Cooperation. From 2009 to 2011, he became the Manager of the Cheboksary Operations Office of Branch No. 6 of Mosoblbank JSCB (OJSC); and from 2011 to 2013, he was in the position of director of branch No. 19 of the joint-stock bank of the same bank.

In 2011, Nikolayev ran for the members of the State Council of the Chuvash Republic of the V convocation from the "A Just Russia" party, as a result of the distribution of mandates, he was elected member of the regional parliament. He was a member of the Committee of the State Council of the Chuvash Republic on budget, finance and taxes and the committee of the State Council of the Chuvash Republic on economic policy, agro-industrial complex and ecology. He fulfilled his parliamentary powers on a non-permanent basis, without interrupting his main job. Since February 2013, he worked at Otkritie Bank OJSC as a project manager for the Optimization of Operational and Technological Processes of the Operational and Technological Block in Moscow, and in 2015, he worked as a project manager for the Operational and Technological Processes Optimization Department at PJSC Khanty-Mansiysk Bank Otkritie in Moscow.

In September 2015, Nikolayev ran for the position of the Head of the Chuvash Republic and at the same time was nominated for deputies of the Cheboksary City Assembly of Deputies. As a result of the elections, he won 14.7% of the votes in the elections of the head of the republic, became a member of the city council, but refused the mandate, remaining a member of the parliament of the republic. On 18 September 2016, he participated in the elections to the State Council of the Chuvash Republic of the VI convocation from the regional branch of the "A Just Russia" party. He was the first number in the single list of candidates of the party, he also ran in the Yadrinsky single-mandate constituency No. 9. After being elected, he refused a seat in the Chuvash parliament due to his election to the State Duma. In 2016, he had the status of an individual entrepreneur. From July to September 2016, he worked as an advisor to the general director of the Auction House of the Russia.

=== Member of the State Duma ===
At the same time, on 18 September 2016, Nikolayev was elected member of the State Duma of the VII convocation from the "A Just Russia" party. He ran in the federal list of candidates (first number in the regional group number 10), as well as in the Cheboksary single-mandate constituency number 38. Following the results of the elections, he got a seat in the State Duma on the party list. In a single-mandate constituency, he took second place with a score of 11.99% after the candidate from United Russia party Leonid Cherkesov had 46.77%.

The State Duma took the position of deputy chairman of the State Duma commission on control over the reliability of information about income, property and property obligations submitted by State Duma members, mandate issues and issues of member's ethics.

On 22 January 2020, he was appointed chairman of the State Duma Committee on Nationalities. On 29 January 2020, he resigned as member of the State Duma in connection with the appointment of the acting Head of the Chuvash Republic; the vacated mandate of the State Duma member was transferred to the member of the State Council of Chuvashia, Igor Molyakov.

=== Head of the Chuvash Republic ===
On 29 January 2020, by the Decree of the President of Russia, Vladimir Putin, Nikolayev was appointed acting Head of the Chuvash Republic, after the dismissal of Mikhail Ignatyev due to the loss of confidence. Nikolayev commented on his appointment as acting head of Chuvashia as follows: "To be honest, emotions overwhelm me. I am a simple rural guy, I never dreamed of getting into the Kremlin, shaking hands with the president of the country".

From the moment of his appointment, he began to form a new composition of the Cabinet of Ministers of the Chuvash Republic. At his own recommendation, State Duma member Aksakov became the head of the deliberative body created under the Head of the Chuvash Republic - the Public Council on Economic Issues. When forming the new government of the Chuvash Republic, he uses the personnel of the previous Cabinet of Ministers of the Chuvash Republic, including those who are members of the United Russia party. On 6 February 2020, he took over the duties of the Chairman of the Cabinet of Ministers of the Chuvash Republic, replacing Ivan Motorin in this post.

On 15 February 2020, he resigned as head of the Chuvash regional branch of the A Just Russia party, announcing that he would be nominated for the election of the head of the Chuvash Republic in September 2020 as a self-nominated candidate.

During the Single Election Day in September 2020, in the elections of the Head of the Chuvash Republic, Nikolayev won the office after gaining 75.61% of the votes with a turnout of 55.51%. His inauguration was scheduled for 22 September 2020. In 2021, the powers of the Chairman of the Cabinet of Ministers of the Chuvash Republic were transferred to the First Deputy Chairman of the Cabinet of Ministers. Mikhail Nozdryakov.

In 2025, Nikolayev was reelected as head of Chuvashia. As an independent candidate, he was the only non-United Russia member to be reelected as governor in the nationwide elections.

== Personal life ==
=== Family ===
He is married for the second time. From the first marriage, with Olga Gennadyevna Nikolayeva, who lives in the city of Cheboksary, they had a son, Oleg, and a daughter, Olga, who, after divorce, lived with their mother.

His second wife Natalya Alekseyevna Nikolayeva (née Romanova), (born 6 March 1976), is a native of the city of Cheboksary, with whom Nikolayev has two joint children, son Maxim, and daughter, as well as a daughter from Natalia's first marriage. According to Natala, the children of Nikolayev "from their first marriage <...> often visit them". In 1997, Natalia graduated from the Chuvash State Pedagogical Institute named after I. Ya. Yakovlev, where she received the profession of a primary school teacher She worked as a teacher-psychologist at the Cheboksary secondary school № 45; for three years she worked as a responsible producer of the radio station "Your Radio" FSUE GTRK "Chuvashia"; held the position of Deputy Director of Milan - Flowers - Cheboksary LLC. She also worked in the Cheboksary branch of JSCB Mosoblbank (OJSC) as a leading advertising specialist. She is a member of the "A Just Russia" party. In 2015, she became the founder and head of the Development Charitable Foundation. (Note: Фонд был ликвидирован в 2017 году; размещался в помещении 7 дома 25 по улице Ярославской города Чебоксары, где размещается Коллегия адвокатов «Гарант» Чувашской Республики) In 2015, Natalia was a candidate for deputies of the Cheboksary City Assembly of Deputies from the A Just Russia party, and in 2016, from the same party, she participated in the elections to the State Council of the Chuvash Republic of the VI convocation. From 24 June 2020, she is a Chairman of the ChROO "Union of Women of Chuvashia".

As of August 2015, when Oleg gave an interview as part of the election campaign, the eldest son was 16 years old, the youngest daughter was 3.5 years old.

His father, Aleksey Timofeyevich, worked as a driver on the collective farm "Marksist" of the Krasnochetaysky District of the Chuvash Autonomous Soviet Socialist Republic, died in 1977. His mother, Valentina Nikoalyeva (née Grigoryeva) - worked on the same collective farm as an ordinary collective farmer, and died later. His grandfather. Timofey, participated twice in exhibitions in Moscow at VDNKh. His grandmother was the daughter of a shopkeeper. His elder brother and younger sister live in Cheboksary (2015).

His uncle, Nikolay Grigoryev (1937-2018), in whose Nikoayev's family was brought up after the death of his parents, a vice-rector from 1993 to 1998, and first vice-rector from 1998 to 2014. He is the dean of the Faculty of Civil Engineering from 2001 to 2003 and from 2010 to 2012, at the Chuvash State University, I. N. Ulyanova. Grigoryev candidate of pedagogical sciences (1999); Chairman of the Committee on Education, Science, Culture and National Policy, member of the Presidium of the State Council of the Chuvash Republic from 1998 to 2002. Many of his students head the leading construction organizations of the Chuvash Republic. In the summer of 2020, in order to perpetuate the memory of Grigoryev, a memorial place (a stele made of natural stone) was created on the outskirts of the village of Koshlaushi, Krasnochetaysky district, where Nikolay was born and raised. The memorial place is created under the control of Nikolay's brother, Gennady, (born 1949), who was the Honorary Power Engineer of the Chuvash Republic in 1996.

=== Personal background ===
Nikolayev is fluent in his native Chuvash language, and expresses himself in German. His religion is Orthodox.

In his youth, he was fond of athletics, boxing, wrestling, martial arts. He doesn't smoke. His favorite film is Seventeen Moments of Spring. He loves the bathhouse, as he pretends to drown himself. In Chuvashia, Nikolayev's lives in a private house located in a closed, restricted for entry / exit, elite cottage village of Zapadny, built up in a forest to the north of the village of Chandrovo, 300 meters from the Yadrinskoye highway in the city of Cheboksary 5 km west of the village of Khirkasy, Cheboksary region.

Nikolayev participates in the donor movement, where he took part twice in the action "Donor Day in the State Duma".

=== Income and property ===
In 2016, Nikolayev earned 3 million 77 thousand rubles, in 2017, 4 million 697.9 thousand rubles, in 2018. 4 million 809.6 thousand rubles. His second wife, Natalia, earned 150 thousand, 100 thousand and 217.4 thousand rubles, respectively. he owns a Hyundai ix55 car, while his wife owns a Nissan Micra.

While he was a State Duma member, his family used an apartment with an area of 168.20 m² in Moscow.

The spouse has a house with an area of 240 m² and a plot of land for a country house with an area of 800 sq. m. Also, between the spouses and 3 children (from a second marriage), a plot for individual housing construction with an area of 1,200 sq. m is divided in equal shares.

== Criticism and reviews ==
A number of public structures criticize Nikolayev for the fact that, as a deputy of the State Duma, he initiated a bill according to which the study of national languages in the republics of the Russian Federation should be voluntary - at the request of schoolchildren and their parents and not to the detriment of mastering Russian as the state language of Russia. A number of social activists in the national republics opposed the adoption of the law. The head of the Chuvash public association "Border Brotherhood" Yuri Osokin explained that the adoption of the law may lead to the fact that "children will not know their native languages - the basis of their national culture", "the bill is directed against the native languages of the constituent entities of the Russian Federation." According to the leader of the Communist Party faction in the Cheboksary City Assembly of Deputies Dmitry Yevseyev, if the law is adopted, "it is completely incomprehensible what will happen to the army of school teachers and specialized faculties in pedagogical universities." The coordinator of the Committee for Civil Initiatives in Chuvashia, Igor Mikhailov, noted that "there is no consolidation and clearly expressed position among the Chuvash national organizations, as well as teachers of the Chuvash language." In response to criticism, Oleg Nikolaev noted: “I am a co-author of amendments to the law on education, which for some reason some call the law on languages. Some people argue that with these amendments we infringed upon the national languages, but in fact we protected them by providing 4 hours to study them in the federal part of the educational standard. And most importantly, the Foundation for the Preservation and Development of Native Languages has been created."

He is also criticized for supporting the law on the publicity of correspondence in messengers, which is why Telegram has problems in Russia.

Secretary of the Chuvash regional branch of the United Russia party Yury Kislov welcomed the appointment of Nikolayev to the post of interim head of Chuvashia: "I was glad that Fair Russia "Putin entrusted to try to steer Chuvashia. Usually she was in opposition and only scolded the authorities, but now we need to work and show how they can do it. If they know how to work, Chuvashia will get advantages from this, I think. <...> Since Putin has entrusted it, it means that everything has been calculated and everything will be fine. “I was glad that Putin entrusted A Just Russia to try to steer Chuvashia. Usually he was in opposition and only scolded the authorities, but now we need to work and show how they can do it. If they know how to work, Chuvashia will get advantages from this, I think. Since Putin has entrusted it, it means that everything has been calculated and everything will be fine."

According to the newspaper Zavtra: "The new head of Chuvashia is entirely guided by another Chuvash - federal heavyweight Anatoly Aksakov." Aksakov, Chairman of the State Duma Committee on the Financial Market, commented to RIA Novosti: “We expect that the republic will begin to demonstrate forward movement in a fairly short time. One of the most dynamic republics will be, I am sure of that. Nikolayev will be able to unite all healthy forces in the republic, regardless of party affiliation, and will demand not party affiliation, but professionalism and work for the good of the republic."

Professor of ChSU named after I. N. Ulyanova, Vladimir Vasilyev, commenting on the appointment of Nikolayev, first of all drew attention to the fact that Nikolayev has no connections with the business circles of Chuvashia. Cheboksary journalist Aleksandr Belov noted: "the local authorities were quite jealous of his activities, it was not easy for him to organize meetings with voters, and the heads of enterprises who approached him were sometimes even punished. And yesterday in Cheboksary there were even fireworks, with which the townspeople celebrated not only the resignation of Mikhail Ignatyev, but also the appointment of a new interim."
