= Our Home – Russia =

1995–2006 political party in Russia

Our Home – Russia Наш дом – Россия
- Abbreviation: NDR (English); НДР (Russian)
- President: Viktor Chernomyrdin
- Founders: Viktor Chernomyrdin; Rem Viakhirev; Oleg Soskovets
- Founded: 12 May 1995
- Dissolved: 12 May 2006
- Merged into: United Russia
- Headquarters: 12th building, Academician Sakharov Avenue, Moscow
- Newspaper: Home and Fatherland
- Membership (1999): 120,000
- Ideology: Liberalism; Liberal conservatism
- Political position: Centre to centre-right
- Colours: Dark blue
- Slogan: "Faith, Strength, Freedom" (Russian: "Вера, Сила, Свобода")

Party flag
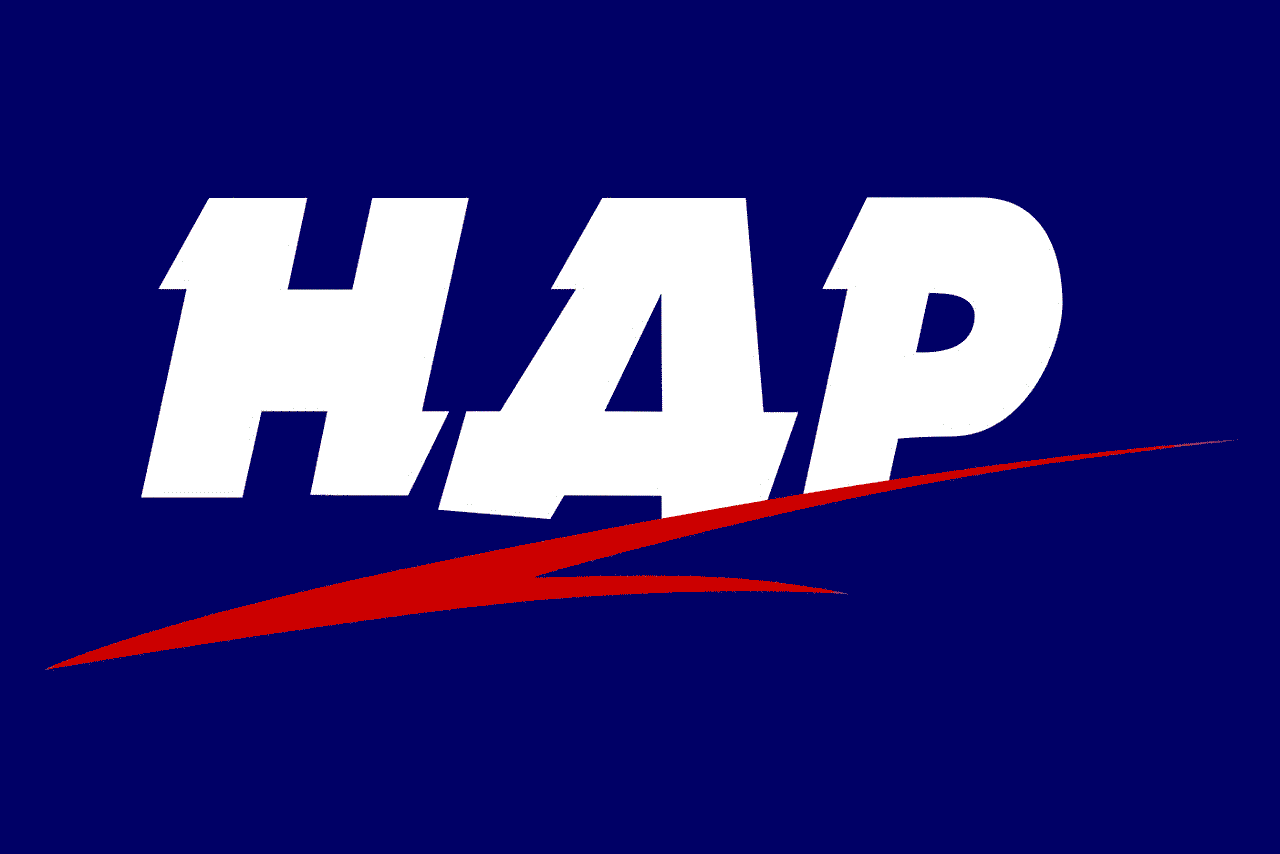

Website
- ndr.ru (archived)

Our Home – Russia (NDR; Russian: Наш дом – Россия; НДР; Nash dom – Rossiya, NDR) was a Russian political party that existed from 1995 to the mid-2000s.

== History ==
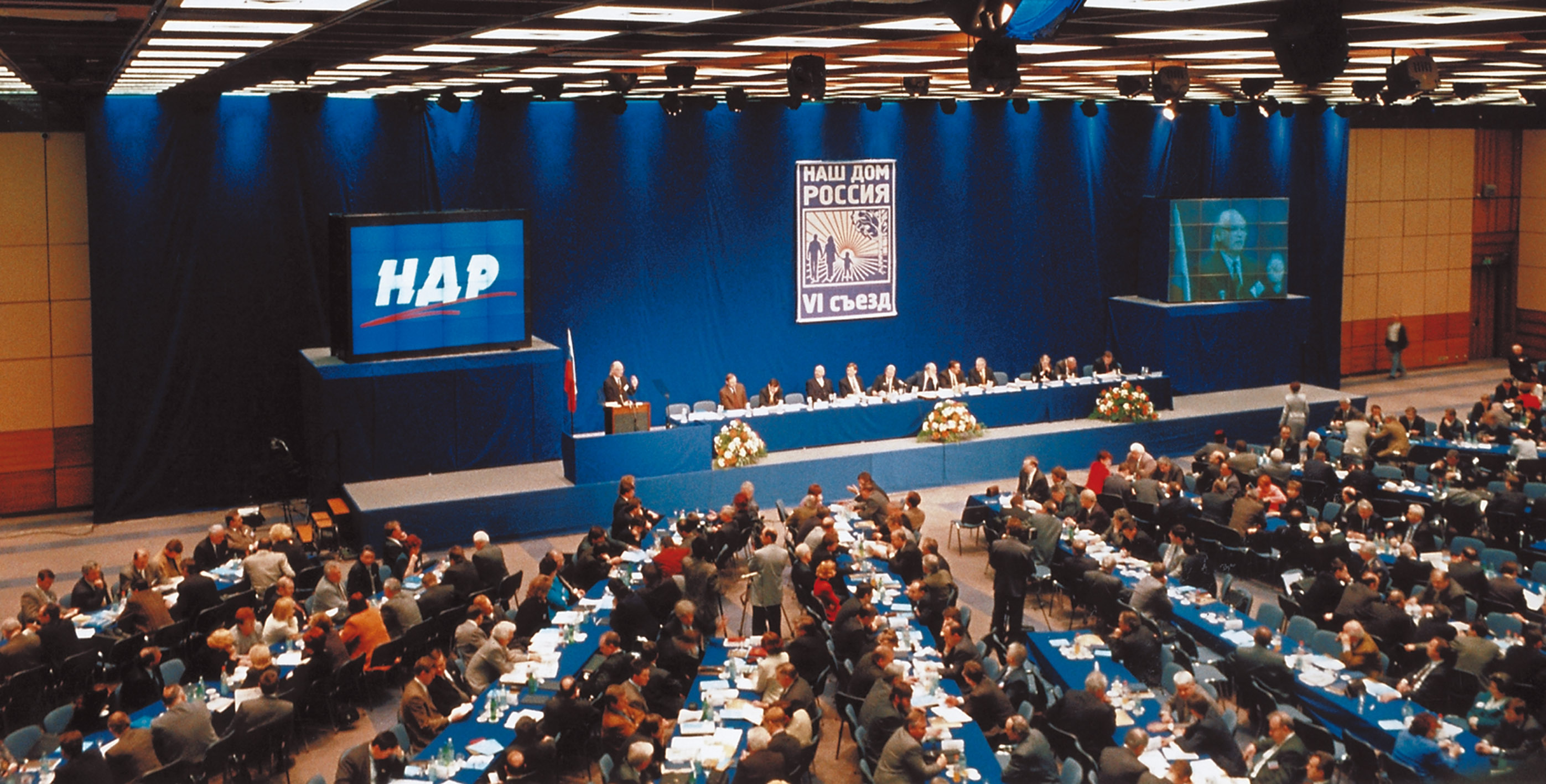
6th Congress of NDR, April 1999.

Our Home – Russia was founded in 1995 by then Russian Prime Minister Viktor Chernomyrdin. It was a liberal, centrist political movement, founded for the purpose of rallying more technocratic-reformist (right-wing) government supporters. At the time of its founding, Chernomyrdin had the backing of Russian president Boris Yeltsin along with numerous large financial institutions such as Association of Russian Banks, and major companies such as Gazprom, of which he was formerly the chairman. The movement attracted the sympathies and interests of many prominent members of the ruling elite of Russia, and NDR was thus nicknamed "the party of power". It was also known as the party of the Oligarchs, the position previously identified with another political party, Democratic Choice of Russia. Two other parties were interested in cooperating with NDR after its foundation: parts of the Agrarian Party of Russia and Democratic Choice of Russia. Together their platform would promote "freedom, property, and legality", and would favor such policies as reducing the state's role in the economy, support for small businesses, privatization of agriculture, and military cutbacks. However, after Chernomyrdin's candidacy for a second term as prime minister was in 1998 rejected by the Duma, Our Home – Russia declined the other parties' bid for cooperation.

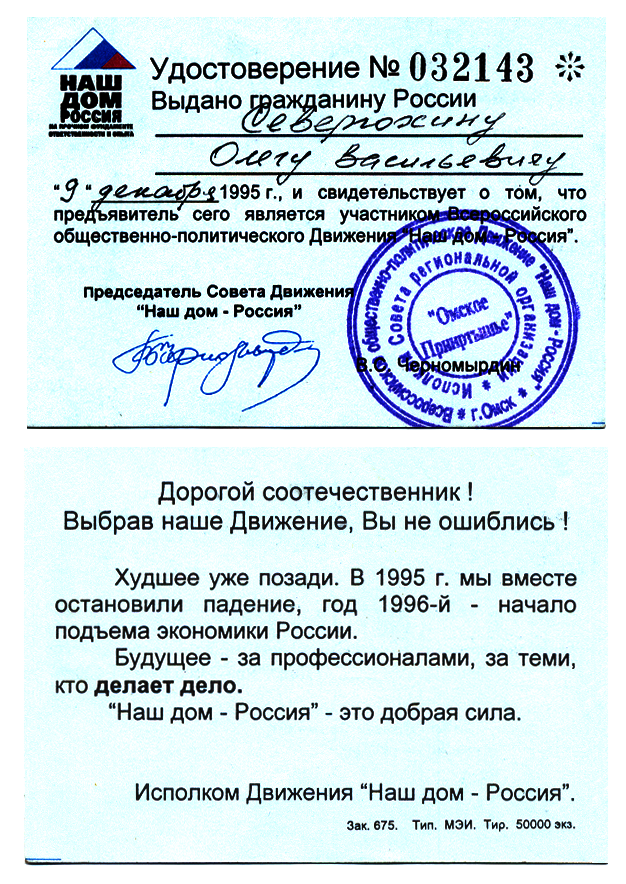
Party card member, 1995

Although it was critical of the war in Chechnya, Viktor Chernomyrdin and NDR played a central role in supporting Yeltsin in his 1996 bid for re-election as President of the Russian Federation. "To sum up why Our Home – Russia is for Yeltsin, I can say only one thing--because we are for reforms, for the constitution of Russia, for peace in Chechnya, for a normal life in Russia," Chernomyrdin told ITAR-TASS news agency in 1996.

In the spring of 1998, Yeltsin dismissed Chernomyrdin as head of government and in 1999 Yeltsin's administration backed a newly formed party, Unity, instead of Our Home – Russia. As a result, Our Home – Russia, which had 55 seats in the Russian State Duma in 1995-1999, won only 8 seats in the December 1999 election. It did not form a separate faction in the next Duma and merged with United Russia instead.

== Electoral results ==
=== State Duma ===
Election	Leader	Votes	%	Seats	+/–	Government
1995	Viktor Chernomyrdin	7,009,291	10.13 (#3)	55 / 450	–	Coalition
1999	Viktor Chernomyrdin	790,983	1.19 (#10)	7 / 450	▼48	Coalition

== Notable members ==
- Anatoly Sobchak
- Vladimir Putin

== See also ==
- Political parties in Russia
- Politics of Russia
