= Sergei Pugachev =

Russian-born French business magnate (born 1963)

- Сергей Пугачёв
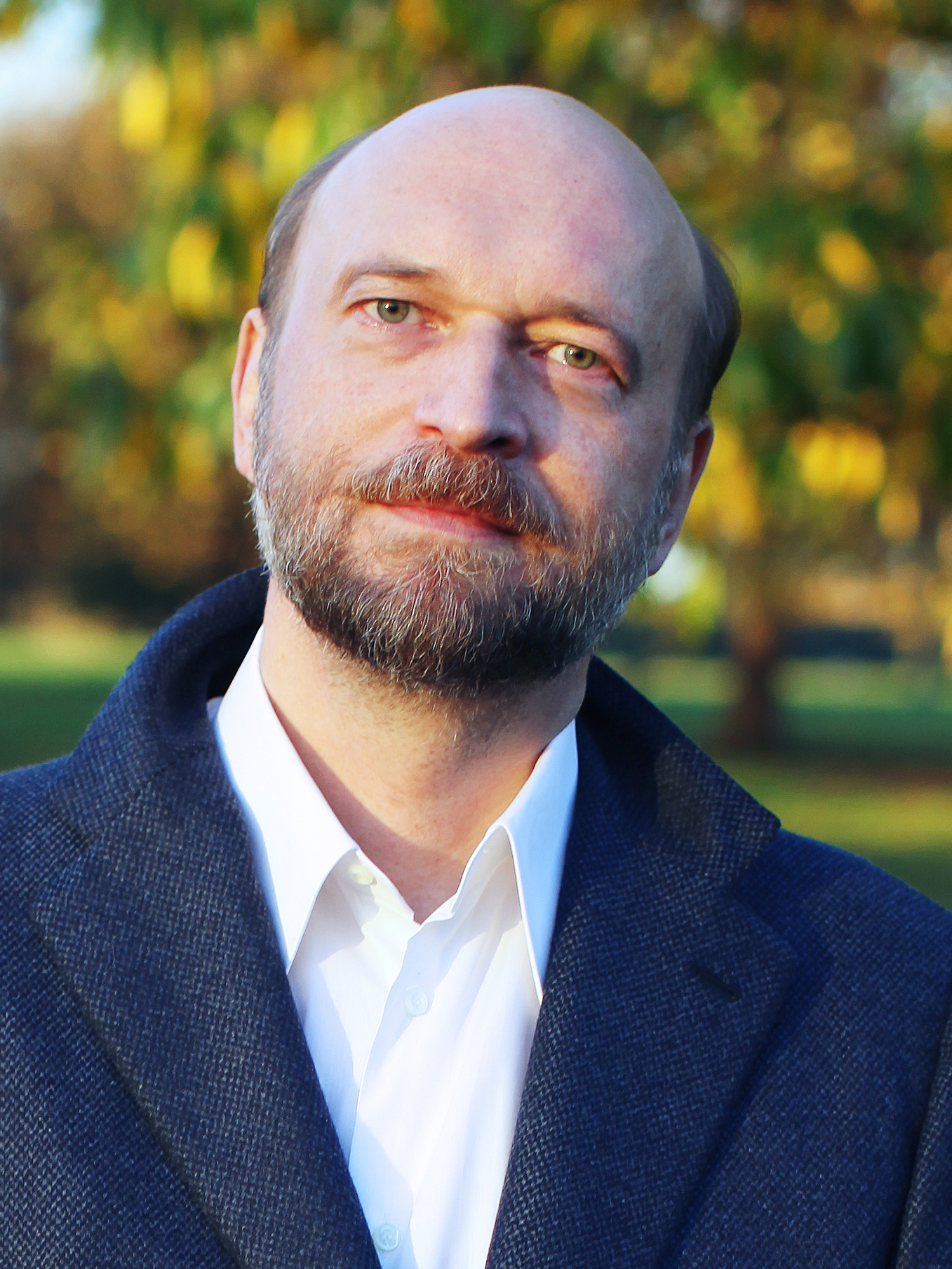
- Pugachev in 2014
- Born: Sergei Viktorovich Pugachev; 4 February 1963 (age 63); Kostroma, Russian SFSR, Soviet Union
- Occupations: Businessman; politician
- Spouse: Galina Arkhipova (divorced)
- Partner: Alexandra Tolstoy (2008–2016)
- Children: 6

Russian Federation Senator from the Republic of Tuva
- In office 24 December 2001 – 4 January 2011
- Preceded by: Sherig-ool Oorzhak
- Succeeded by: Galina Munzuk
- Website: www.pugachevsergei.com

Sergei Viktorovich Pugachev, also spelled Sergey Pugachyov (French: Sergueï Pougatchev; Russian: Сергей Викторович Пугачёв; born 4 February 1963), is a Russian-born French business magnate. He is a doctor of technical sciences and a member of the International Engineering Academy.

Pugachev moved to the United States in 1994. Before that, he lived primarily in France and the United Kingdom. He has major real estate development projects in the United States, France, Luxembourg, Russia and the United Kingdom.

At the start of the 2000s, Pugachev gained a reputation in the Russian mass media for allegedly having introduced Russia's new president Vladimir Putin to the governor of the Sretensky Monastery in central Moscow, Archimandrite Tikhon Shevkunov, with whom Pugachev had been in a close relationship as a major sponsor of the monastery.

== Early life ==
Pugachev was born into a Russian military family. His father, Viktor Fyodorovich Pugachev (29 May 1930 – 2010), was a student in the first class of the Kiev Suvorov Military School. He was awarded Commander of the Order of the Red Star and held command positions in airborne troops. He was the first commander of 21st Paratrooper brigade. He retired as Deputy Chief of the department of general tactics and operational art of the Military Academy. He died in 2010.

Pugachev's paternal grandfather was Fyodor Kuzmich Pugachev (1892 – 25 June 1942), an officer of the Tsarist army who fought in the First World War as staff Officer of the 4th Nesvizhsky Grenadier Regiment of Field Marshal Prince Barclay de Tolly. In the Soviet era, he held command positions in the Red Army. In July 1918, as the Commander of the 1st Don Soviet Infantry Division, he led the fighting against the troops of General Krasnov on the northern side of the Tsaritsyn Front. He was awarded Cavalier of the order of the Red banner. He was not involved in the Communist party. He later held positions of command in the Red Army. In his 30s, he was arrested. On 19 November 1941, he was appointed as commander of 22nd Separate Infantry Brigade as part of the second Shock Army of the Volkhov Front. He died near Myasnoi Bor.

Pugachev's maternal grandfather was Konstantin Timofeevich Klochkov (1906 – 9 September 1942). He held command positions in the Red Army. He was Commissar of 60 guards 20 guards in the rifle division.

Pugachev claimed to have defended 2 dissertations, including "Methods and investment policy of the management model of the bank" at the Russian Academy of Sciences. In October 2000, he defended the dissertation "Development of information technology for management of financial resources of credit organizations". According to official data, he was awarded Doctor of Technical Sciences. Pugachev wrote three monographs and authored more than forty research papers. Other sources found Pugachev's three diplomas and other facts of his biography to be fraudulent.

Pugachev is a member of the Russian Academy of Engineering (successor to the USSR Academy of Engineering) and engaged in "active work on the connection between science and production". From 1993, he repeatedly attracted Academy staff with expertise among the various projects.

== Business career ==
Pugachev was an entrepreneur in the late 1980s. On 26 May 1986, he was sentenced to three years' imprisonment for fraud with confiscation of property and compulsory labor. He served his sentence at the construction sites of the Yaroslavl region. Between 1983 and 1991, Pugachev did not work in the Krasnogvardeysky branch of the Construction Bank of the USSR, as stated in his employment record book, since at the time he was imprisoned in Kresty Prison.

Pugachev borrowed 5500 roubles from his colleague Egorov, promising to buy a new car. According to Pugachev, his father had the opportunity to buy the car. Egorov saw neither the car, nor the money. The day after the sentence was pronounced, Egorov was attacked by unidentified persons.

In 1991, Pugachev established one of the first cooperative banks in the USSR, the Northern Commercial Bank. In 1993, he sold his share. In 1992, he and Sergey Veremeenko organised the International Industrial Bank. At the end of the 1990s, he acquired Yenisei Industrial Company, holding an exploration licence for the region of the Ulug-Khemsky District in Southern Siberia. In the process of exploration and experimental production, the largest coking coal deposit in the world was developed. In 2000, Yenisei obtained a licence for exploration and production of coal at the Elegest deposit. The investment commission of the Russian Federation financed infrastructure for this project in the amount of 1.5 billion dollars, a record investment in the development of a private company.

At the end of the 1990s, he invested in the largest shipbuilding complex in Europe at the St. Petersburg shipbuilding base of Baltiyskiy Zavod and Severnaya Verf and in 60 engineering companies.

At the start of the 2000s, he consolidated under the management of the United Industrial Corporation. According to independent estimates for 2008–2010, the total value was more than US$12 billion.

In 2004, his company signed an investment agreement for an ambitious project for reconstruction and development of the Middle Trading Rows in Red Square.

From 2010 to 2014, Pugachev's Russian assets were successively expropriated, after which he was subject to political persecution. In 2011, at his request, criminal proceedings were instituted in France concerning extortion and threats from the senior staff of DIA. In 2012, he notified Russian authorities about the preparation of the claim in the International tribunal in The Hague. In December 2013, the Russian government filed a claim about Pugachev's accountability for subsidiary responsibility in the Moscow Court of Arbitration.

=== Criminal proceedings ===
In 2013, criminal proceedings were again instituted against him in the Russian Federation.

In June 2014, the Russian Federation appealed in the London High Court concerning interim measures in support of a subsidiary civil suit in the Moscow arbitration court.

On 11 July 2014, Mr. Justice Henderson froze Pugachev's assets on English territory and forced him to disclose his private assets, owned directly or indirectly, in support of the claim concerning subsidiary responsibility, as requested by the Russian government. According to UK law enforcement bodies, the Russian government illegally surveilled Pugachev and his family in England via private detectives. At the end of 2014, the Russian Interpol bureau announced that Pugachev was wanted.

=== 2015 ===
On 2 March 2015, Mr Justice Peter Smith prohibited Pugachev from travelling outside England and Wales and ordered his passports and travel documents transferred to the firm Hogan Lovells (representing the interests of the Russian government). Pugachev violated the order and returned to France. In May, Scotland Yard personnel found explosive devices under Pugachev's car. Investigation was taken on by the Counter Terrorism Command, SO15, and Pugachev and his family were provided with government protection. French authorities later investigated attempted murder within the framework of international orders. Pugachev was repeatedly targeted by attacks, both in Russia and abroad. By 2010, multiple attempts had been made on his life, injuring several security personnel.

On 21 September 2015, a Hague International tribunal logged Pugachev's claim (as a French citizen) against the Russian Federation concerning the expropriation of his assets for a sum of US$12 billion. Pugachev engaged the New York legal firm King & Spalding to contest the claim. After dealing with the complaint of his French lawyers at Interpol Central Bureau, in October the Interpol commission found the request of the Russian Federation to be untenable due to political motivation, after which Pugachev was no longer wanted by Interpol.

On 22 December, Mrs. Justice Rose sentenced him to two years imprisonment for contempt of court. In the judgement, the Judge mentioned that Pugachev had good reason to believe that his life was under threat from Russian agents.

Returning to France, Pugachev filed a claim against the Russian Federation within the framework of the Franco-Russia agreement on protection of investments concerning the expropriation of his assets, which became a subject of general interest and irritation for the Russian authorities.

=== 2016 ===
In April 2016, Pugachev's lawyer Karinna Moskalenko filed a complaint with the European Court of Human Rights concerning the facts of violations committed with consideration in Russia of a civil claim for subsidiary responsibility. Pugachev then switched to French legal firm Lazareff Le Bars.

On 17 June 2016, his lawyers appointed Professor Thomas Clay as arbitrator at The Hague International Tribunal for consideration of his arbitration proceedings against the Russian Federation. On 5 July, the European Court of Human Rights registered the complaint and reported that the court would proceed to consider this complaint as soon as technically possible. On 15 July, the Russian Federation informed the president of the Tribunal and Pugachev's lawyers that it accepted this jurisdiction and would take part in this process. On 24 July, the Russian side missed the procedural deadlines for selecting one of the international arbitrators.

On 8 August 2016, the general secretary of the tribunal took on the responsibility to appoint a second arbitrator, after the Russian Federation missed the procedural deadline. On 19 August, the general secretary appointed Bernardo M. Cremades as the second arbitrator.

=== 2017 ===
On 11 October 2017, the London High Court ruled that Pugachev's trusts are "shams".

=== 2020–2021 ===
Pugachev was a source for Catherine Belton's 2020 book Putin's People. A Russian entity and numerous Russian oligarchs, including Rosneft, Mikhail Fridman, Peter Aven, Shalva Chigirinsky, and Roman Abramovich filed lawsuits in the United Kingdom during March and April 2021 against HarperCollins and Belton, who is a Reuters reporter based in London, over material contained in her 2020 book.

== Political career ==
At the start of the 1990s, Pugachev became an adviser to Russian leaders. He was acquainted with Viktor Chernomyrdin, Oleg Soskovets, Alexander Korzhakov, Andrey Vavilov, Valentin Yumashev, Alexander Livshits and Viktor Gerashchenko. He became a member of the inner circle of Boris Yeltsin and was one of the leaders of his campaign staff in 1996. American director Roger Spottiswoode made a film based on these events in 2003, Spinning Boris. The character based on Pugachev was played by Gregory Hlady.

In 1995, a scandal broke out concerning the IIB established by Pugachev, which had issued Eurocards for Yeltsin and members of his family.

In December 1995, he was a candidate for deputy of the Duma on the Federal list of the electoral union of the Party of Russian Unity and Accord with approval of Sergey Shakhray.

According to Pugachev, his connections with America played a crucial role in Yeltsin's 1996 re-election, which was opposed by the communists. Pugachev engaged a team of American political consultants and PR managers headed by George Gorton. He ran Yeltsin's re-election campaign during what Pugachev calls "Russia's last free election". In June 1996, Yeltsin awarded him a Commendation, "For a major contribution to the development of Russian democracy, participation in preparation and carrying out of a campaign for the national elections of the President of the Russian Federation in 1996".

In October 1998, Mikhail Zadornov included Pugachev in the Russian delegation to the annual session of the IMF and the World Bank. Pugachev was represented as leader of a "successful" and "working" bank. Pugachev presented a memorandum about the recovery of the Russian banking system.

In the 1990s, Pugachev suggested making Putin the successor to the Yeltsin family. The Financial Times claimed that Pugachev was not only a friend of Tatyana Dyachenko and her husband Valentin Yumashev, who at that time headed Yeltsin's administration, but also Pugachev and his family is a close friend to Vladimir Putin and Putin's family. Pugachev stated that he, Yeltsin's daughter Tatiana Dyachenko and her future husband, Valentin Yumashev, were part of a tiny group that decided upon Vladimir Putin as the successor to Yeltsin which Pugachev stated was a "tragedy for Russia". He helped Putin to climb the ladder of power, presenting him to Yeltsin. In 1999 and 2000, he was one of Putin's campaign staff leaders. Pugachev said that Putin only wanted to be in power 3 or 4 years and said, "Putin wanted to get rich, too. He was a pragmatic person. We talked about this. He didn't want to leave office poor."

In November 2000, he was elected to the board of Russian Union of Industrialists and Entrepreneurs (RSPP). From November 2000 to January 2003, he was vice president of the RSPP.

He became a member of the Franco-Russian government commission. On 24 December 2001, he was elected Senator of the Russian Federation.

On 26 December 2001, he was approved as the representative of the Tuvan government in the Federation Council of the Russian Federation. His candidacy was supported by 80% of Tuvan deputies. Pugachev served until 4 January 2011.

He was the initiator of the acquisition by the Russian Federation of a licence for production of the French Mistral helicopter carrier.

After a detailed inspection by the French Ministry of Defence, Pugachev's Baltiyskiy Zavod, part of the Pugachev-controlled United Industrial Corporation (OPK) was selected to construct Mistral-class helicopter carriers for use in the Russian Navy, The agreement was signed on 25 January 2011.

However, on 4 January 2011, under pressure from Putin, Pugachev was forced to resign as a senator, ostensibly because of his having obtained French citizenship.

== Investment ==
In 1991, Pugachev established one of the first cooperative banks in the USSR, the Northern Commercial Bank. In 1993, he sold his share. In 1992, he and Sergey Veremeenko founded JSC "International Industrial Bank" (Pugachev owned 25%), which was one of the first to licensed to perform foreign exchange operations.

IIB was originally formed as a "venture investment fund". The bank sought out troubled long-term assets. It invested in them and then resold them. The bank became one of Russia's 10 largest banks and was the largest credit institution in terms of capital (175 billion rubles). It became a principal member of Visa International and MasterCard Worldwide, operating its own processing centre. In December 1998, the IIB increased its authorised capital to 10 billion rubles. A year later, shareholders invested another 15 billion rubles, raising its authorised capital to 25 billion rubles, just under $1 billion. Most other credit organisations rarely reached that level. The IIB almost caught up with Sberbank on the scale of its own funds and became the country's largest private bank. In January 2002, Pugachev resigned from IIB's board of directors. After the election, Pugachev held from 0–5 percent of assets). According to the Jones Day report, from 2002 the owner of the bank was D. Henderson-Stewart.

In 2003, it was reported that Pugachev's income was averaging more than 7 million rubles. According to data released in 2010, he earned 3 billion rubles, significantly more than other Russian Senators. As a senator, Pugachev transferred his assets to the control of the JSC United Industrial Corporation. Under OPK control, assets were held in various sectors of the Russian economy. Their value amounted to more than US$15 billion.

Pugachev singled out the development of 1160 hectares of land on Rublevky, 70 hectares on Vasilevsky Island in St. Petersburg, the project "Red Square, 5" for construction of hotels and apartments, construction of a hotel in Sochi for the 2014 Olympics, the company Russia Coal, the oil companies Aki-Atyr and the "White Nights", and also the "Yenisei Industrial Company" (EPC), which owned the licence for development of the coal deposit in Tuva, the shipbuilding businesses Severnaya Verf, Baltiyskiy Zavod, the Central Design Bureau "Iceberg" and others.

== Expropriations ==
After he left the Senate, the Government began confiscating Pugachev's various properties.

=== Shipbuilding ===
At the end of the 1990s, Pugachev started to acquire shares in shipbuilding and engineering businesses in St. Petersburg, including Severnaya Verf Shipbuilding plant JSC, the Baltiyskiy Zavod JSC and the Iceberg Central Design Bureau. Pugachev was a major shareholder in Baltiyskiy Zavod. Baltiyskiy Zavod was part of the Pugachev-controlled United Industrial Corporation (OPK). Pugachev transferred the main capacity to the Severnaya Verf site and started implementation of the largest development project in St. Petersburg with development of 70 hectares in the centre of the city on Vasilevsky Island.

Baltiyskiy Zavod and Severnaya Verf built 9 Corvettes, 5 Frigates, 8 Supply Ships and "the largest icebreaker in the world". Pugachev invented and began construction of the first floating nuclear power plant (PATES).

Baltiyskiy Zavod built the Mistral-class ships, with the value of the deal amounting to 1.5 billion euros. After a 35-year hiatus, construction was resumed on a series of diesel-electric icebreakers—"St. Petersburg" and "Moscow" and nuclear-powered icebreaker "50 years of Victory".

The complex produced more than 70% of the surface combat ships for the Russian fleet built during that time. One of its projects was the construction of the "Russia" yachts for President Putin. In 2008, the Russian Federation Federal Service for Defence Orders made the plant the sole supplier of ships in the classes of "corvette", "frigate" and "Comms Boat".

In civil shipbuilding, orders were made for vessels for oil platform supply. Between 2006 and 2009, the shipyards built 2 saturated ship hulls for project VS 470 PSV for Norwegian company Skipper II AS and highly saturated ship hulls for supply off offshore oil platforms of project VS 485 PSV for Norwegian Solvic Hull Supplies AS.

In 2005, Pugachev entities acquired a controlling share in Baltiyskiy Zavod.

In September 2008, the JSC "Baltiyskiy Zavod" completed tests of uninhabited deep-water equipment. The unique underwater vessel built for a customer in Russia, was capable of diving to depths of up to 10 km. The ship is intended for research purposes.

In November 2008, the Baltiyskiy Zavod JSC concluded an agreement with the "Atomenergoprom" JSC for production of two sets of devices for detection of core melt, intended for the first and second blocks forming the Leningrad Nuclear Power Plant (LAES-2).

In December 2008, the country's first domestic diesel-electric icebreaker—Moscow—was transferred to FGUP Rosmorport.

In February 2009, a contract was signed with Concern Energoatom JSC, which involved construction at Baltiyskiy Zavod, launching, completion, testing and transfer into operation of the lead floating power unit of project 20870, the world's first low-capacity nuclear power plant. In June 2010, the lead power unit was launched. In 2009, Baltiyskiy Zavod cast 42 bells with a mass from 10 kg to 5.5 tonnes.

In 2009, the boat "Serafim Sarovsky" was built, as a continuation of the series of communications boats. Construction engaged the C3 JSC Severnaya Verf from 2001. The lead boat "Buverestnik" served as part of LenVMB. The boat "Albatross" was transferred to the hydrographic service of the Caspian flotilla. The "KSV-57" was part of the group of boats for provision of the Northern fleet. In 2009, work was started on the frigate "Fleet Admiral Kasatonov" for project 22350. In spring of 2010, Severnaya Verf launched the first of a series of Corvettes of project 20380 "Soobrazitelniy".

In 2010, the shipyard produced new masts for British military cruiser "HMS Belfast", which participated in delivery of goods to the USSR during the Second World War and performed a thorough reconstruction of the ship. The repair was implemented with Pugachev's personal funds, a budget amounting to 3 million pounds. David Linley, the late Queen's nephew was Pugachev's business partner.

In October 2010, the lead frigate whose construction started in 2006 for project 22350 "Soviet Union Fleet-Admiral Gorshkov" was launched. This is the first of a series of similar ships to be put into service of the navy after the collapse of the USSR.

In November 2010, Baltiyskiy Zavod signed a contract for construction of four tankers. In April 2011, at Severnaya Verf, the third of the "Boikiy" Corvettes was launched, as part of the series of Russian Corvettes of project 20380.

In September 2011, at Baltiyskiy Zavod, the lead ship of the series of four self-propelled oil tankers was launched, for project 2734, constructed for the "Baltic Fuel Company" (BTK).

Pugachev invested significant resources in the acquisition of additional participation in Severnaya Verf, Baltiyskiy Zavod and acquired the "Iceberg" design bureau, engaged in the design of ships for construction in shipyards. Pugachev then owned 75.82% of Severnaya Verf, 88.32% in Baltiyskiy Zavod and 64.82% in the "Iceberg" Design Bureau.

Pugachev's shipbuilding companies became the largest surface shipbuilding centre in Europe. Russian authorities began efforts to seize control of the shipyards. In 2007, the Russian government created United Shipbuilding Corporation (OSK) to consolidate its equity participation in the shipyards. OSK is 100% owned by the state.

In November 2009, Putin invited Pugachev for a personal meeting. During the meeting, Putin told him that the RF wished to acquire Pugachev's share in the shipyards. He made it clear that Pugachev should agree to the sale. Minister for Finance and Deputy Prime Minister Alexei Kudrin made a proposal to allocate US$5 billion for this deal.

At this time, parts of the shipyards were restructured. Part of the restructuring strategy was to move certain production units of Baltiyskiy Zavod to Severnaya Verf and redevelopment of the unused space at the shipyard as a residential and shopping complex by OPK-Development. T shipyards received a loan of about 500 million US dollars from VTB. After a meeting with Putin, Pugachev understood that the restructuring would have to be interrupted.

At OSK's request, the Russian Ministry of Industry and Trade prepared a report on the shipyards. It concluded that the acquisition of these assets was appropriate.

The government developed a plan for acquisition by the RF of the shipyard shares. A key figure in this process was Deputy Prime Minister Igor Sechin, known to many as the organiser of Yukos' destruction. In May 2008, in an interview, in The Sunday Times, Mikhail Khodorkovsky accused "former KGB officer" Sechin of organising both the first and second criminal cases against him: the first for "greed" and the second for "cowardice". Former Yukos leaders were confident that, mainly under Sechin's authority in June 2003, an ideological justification was produced for the Yukos affair – in response to the supposed seizure of state power by the Khodorkovsky group.

The Russian government was not interested in whether the sale had a transparent structure, which would entail financing the acquisition with funds from the Federal budget, which would require approval by the Russian Parliament. Russian government officials discussed several acquisition options – through the RF budget (Federal property agency Rosmuschestvo), or VEB (state corporation Vneshekonombank).

In the end Putin, in agreement with Medvedev, instructed Central Bank head Ignatiev to acquire shares in Pugachev's shipbuilding assets, with first Kudrin specified as curator. From the correspondence between Ulyukaev and the Government, it appears that the Sechin was actually curator, who attempted to put pressure on the Central Bank with the aim of ensuring that the assets would be under-valued.

According to the estimate by international auditing company BDO, the value of the share in the shipyards amounted to 101.36 billion Russian rubles (3.5 billion US dollars). The estimate was produced under pressure. The Government's assessment of contracts for future periods was not included.

BDO estimated these assets at $3.5 billion, while Nomura investment bank valued them at up to 4.2 billion rubles. In 2011, a meeting with Deputy Prime Minister of the Russian Federation Dmitry Kozak, which led Kozak to instruct the parties to work out proposals for a settlement agreement between the RF Central Bank and Pugachev and to reach an agreement by 13 October 2011. The Central Bank issued a mandate to Nomura to negotiate a settlement agreement. Nomura's source reported that the Central Bank used them as a cover to expropriate the assets. According to information from Central Bank Vice-president Shevtsov, at the time of the expropriation the head of Nomura visited the Kremlin and met with President Medvedev regarding the issue of the placement of Central Bank foreign reserves with Nomura.

At the start of 2011, the President expressed his impatience regarding the completion of the transfer of the shipyards, blaming Pugachev for the failure to transfer ownership and threatened to intervene, if Pugachev's holding company, OPK, did not show "good sense". Under increasing pressure from President Putin, the Central Bank applied to the Moscow arbitration court for transfer of the shipyards into a trust. The court delivered an unprecedented decision allowing the transfer of the shares into Central Bank trust management without the owner's consent.

On 6 October 2011, Sechin's successor Vladimir Lisin was appointed chairman of OSK's board of directors. According to media information, Pugachev traveled to London to discuss the shipyards with Lesin, but the meeting never took place. Trade in expropriated assets was closed to the public (in violation of the legislation).

Rosimuschestvo concluded an agreement on organisation of trade with sale of shipbuilding assets to "Camelot" LLC. According to the Federal Tax Service of the Russian Federation, "Camelot" LLC is registered at a mass registration address in Ivanovo. The managing company and sole owner of "Camelot" LLC was LLC "Management and Business", the directors and the sole holder of the LLC "Management and Business" was Oleg Viktorovich Borobyev, who was head of 390 other Russian companies. In May 2013, "Camelot" LLC made the decision on accession to the Krug LLC and on 17 September 2013 joined this company. On 30 October 2013, Krug LLC liquidated. On 18 March 2014, the court found Krug LLC bankrupt. On 23 September 2014, Krug LLC was liquidated. "Camelot" LLC released its shipbuilding company assets to a value of 12,978,603 thousand rubles. Consequently, trading was carried out by one-day firms, registered to a natural person registered in the Ivanovo region, by analogy with the sale of Yukos assets by the Baikal Finance Group.

=== Yenisei Industrial Company ===
The Yenisei Industrial Company (EPC) acquired the licence (up to 31 May 2020) for the development of the Elegest highlands in Ulug-Khem coal basin in Tuva, a remote region in the south-central part of Russia on the Mongolian border. The Russian Government later gave permission for construction of a railway, needed for movement of coking coal from the deposit.

At the time of acquisition of the deposit, it was impossible to calculate whether the investment in EPC was profitable: geological surveys were needed that established that the coal deposit contained about a billion tonnes of high quality coking coal (the world's largest).

In 2008, EPC signed an agreement for the acquisition of 25% of shares at the market price and the option of up to 49% with Japanese conglomerate Mitsui. Mitsui then financed the geological exploratory work, on an irrevocable basis.

Expropriation of Russian shares started in 2010, leading Pugachev to decide to sell EPC. In August 2010, OPK-Mining hired Credit Suisse to establish a list of potential buyers. According to a 2011 KPMG assessment, the value of EPC amounted to 5 billion US dollars. After the signing the mandate, Credit Suisse conducted а global road show and presented a list of 40 potential buyers, including the Mitsui group, and Arcelor Mittal.

Putin warned Pugachev not to sell to foreign firms. Pugachev was thereby forced to stop negotiations with all foreign applicants. Putin suggested, as potential buyers, EvrazHoldings, Abramova and Abramovich and Severstal (belonging to Yuri Kovalchuk). Later, it was decided that the only possible Russian EPC buyer was Russkaya Mednaya Company, controlled by Igor Altushkin. This deal was agreed with Putin.

In 2011, an agreement was signed for the sale of EPC to Russian Mednay Company between Basterre Business Corp. (for the seller) and Devecom Ventures Ltd. (for the buyer). Under this deal, Pugachev received 2.4 billion US dollars and part of the profits from the company's development over the next 6 years. Altushkin confirmed to Pugachev that Putin agreed the deal. Under pressure from the government, Pugachev consented to the sale.

American company Gerald Metals, representing Altushkin's interests, valued the company at more than 5 billion dollars. In order to remove the company from the market, Altushkin was given the first payment for the deal in the amount of US$150 million. Under the deal, before the payment of the purchase price, Altushkin's business partner had to be appointed chairman of the board of EPC. The business partner turned out to be a well-known friend of Chechen Republic President Ramzan Kadyrov.

In 2011, the government intervened in the deal. Altushkin used these events as an excuse for violating his obligation to pay for EPC shares. Given its positions on the board and senior management positions, the company was already under the control of Baisarov and Altushkin. In 2012, in a letter from Putin's inauguration.

Putin instructed first Deputy Prime Minister Shuvalov to remove the licence and transfer it to Baisarov's organization. On 4 September 2012, Baisarov asked to find a way to cancel the licence of the EPC JSC. It is noteworthy that those present at this meeting included Miroshnikov, the Deputy Leader of the Deposit Insurance Agency and one of the main authors of the attack on Pugachev.

On 28 December 2012, the Government withdrew the EPC licence that was valid until 2020. The basis for withdrawal was the failure of EPC to fulfil its obligations, although EPC at that time was controlled by Altushkin and Baisarov.

The licence for development of the Tuvan Elegest deposit was transferred to the Tuvan Energy Industrial Corporation, registered to Baisarov.

Altushkin refused to make payments for the agreement he signed with Pugachev due to the Russian Federation's expropriation. The EPC licence was expropriated without compensation to its owner. 1.5 billion dollars from the EPC budget, allocated for the infrastructure project, was transferred to Russian Railways (Yakunin).

=== Hotel in Red Square (Middle Trading Rows) ===
In 2000, the Government announced a project for restructuring certain historical buildings, adjacent to Red Square in Moscow. For this purpose, a state enterprise was created under the name "Kremlevsky", with the rights to manage these buildings.

In 2004, Putin asked Pugachev to provide the Ministry of Defence with 1.5 billion rubles for construction of housing for military service personnel. Money was allocated, and as compensation an investment agreement was signed covering Pugachev's reconstruction and development of the Middle Trading Rows. Upon completion of the reconstruction, the five-star "Kremlyevsky" hotel complex was to open.

The project was presented by managers to Kozhin. At the presentation, he said that the main difficulty in choosing the investor for "Kremlevsky" was the strict conditions involving compensation to the former owner (the Ministry of Defence) of about $60 million. Another problem was registering the property (more than half the total area of the complex of buildings). Kozhin also said that these conditions were accepted only by United Industrial Corporation (OPK) and became 100% owned by the project investor. According to him, the Ministry of Defence had compensated Pugachev from its own funds. Architect Jean-Michel Wilmotte was invited to participate as a specialist in interior design of architectural monuments. Nightly room rates began at US$10 thousand.

As Putin insisted in 2007, Al-Waleed bin Talal was approved for management of the hotel complex by Raffles. Pugachev obtained the right to ownership of the residential part (about 40 thousand square metres) on Red Square after completion of construction, and 2 hectares of land, as well as a concession for the "Kremlin" hotel management operation in the perimeter building at the same address. In addition to its financing obligations, Pugachev's company transferred 1.5 billion rubles to the Ministry of Defence.

According to data from the Accounting Chamber, the money allocated by Pugachev for construction to the military services of the Ministry of Defence for the most part was taken. At the date of the evaluation, according to an Ernst and Young assessment, an investment agreement during the economic crisis was estimated at US$950 million. After the Decree of President Putin, approving the terms on 14 February 2005, Pugachev's company OPK Development initiated reconstruction with completion scheduled for 2009–2010.

In August 2008, Finance Minister Kudrin informed Pugachev that Putin wanted to take on the project to build a five-star hotel and residential complex on 5 Red Square. Pugachev agreed to concede the project, at market price. Initially, the Government compensated Pugachev for the Middle Trading Rows, and included it in the amendments to the Law "On the Federal Budget for 2009" of 28 April 2009. The remainder was for inclusion in the 2010 budget. In accordance with Putin's instructions, the responsibility for compensation was given to first vice-premier V. Zubkov.

In 2009, the Administration terminated the contract and transferred the matter to the Federal Guard Service. Construction was frozen without compensation. In March 2011, Pugachev's company the "Middle Trading Rows" LLC tried, through the court, to withdraw 41 billion, but the attempt was unsuccessful, filing a claim against the Ministry of Finance and demanding compensation for the abandonment of the project, and for expenditure on this development project.

In October 2013, the Moscow Court of Arbitration the company STR into bankruptcy. Pugachev fulfilled all the STR obligations from his own resources. Nevertheless, the DIA challenged these payments in court, and did not include this liability in the register of creditors.

On 14 September 2016, the Moscow Court of Arbitration considered the application for liquidation of the Trade and Development Board.

=== Gribanov project ===
The Gribanov project involved the development of 1162 hectares of land in the Krasnogorsk region and the Odintsovo regions.

The project intended to develop land for elite properties, The development involved French architect Jean-Michelle Wilmotte, and the construction of the golf courses involved Arnold Palmer.

In 2009, in consultation with Putin and Medvedev, the VTB Chairman Kostin proposed early payment of the loan for the land, under mortgage to VTB, with the market value of the 1162 hectares estimated at more than US$4 billion.

To implement the project, Pugachev's organizations borrowed US$1 billion from VTB. Pugachev-controlled company OPK-Development managed the construction. According to media information, one of the sites located in the region of the Presidential residence Novo-Ogarevo, acquired by Pugachev (1162 hectares), turned out to be in the ownership of the Federal Protective Service. The media reported that this was the payment for implementation of this project by Pugachev.

In 2009, individual members of the Leninsky Luch collective farm filed a petition in the Krasnogorsk court for cancellation of the original deal with the Dmitrov State Farm in 2003. This petition was rejected by the court due to the expiry of the validity period.

In 2012, another challenge was made to the original deal with the State Farm. At that time the Leninsky Luch collective farm as a legal entity brought proceedings in the Moscow Court of Arbitration against the state farm and company Optic-Trade (landowner) with a request for recognition of the ownership rights of the collective farm for 167 plots.

Optic-Trade claimed that it had not been informed about the court proceedings and was unable to state its defence of the expiry of the limitation period. The Moscow Court of Arbitration ruled in favour of the collective farm, declaring them the legal owner of the land that had been purchased from Optic-Trade. The company only learned of the court proceedings after receiving the notice of appeal. Optic-Trade filed its own appeal claiming that it was not given the opportunity to take part in the proceedings, but the appeal was dismissed.

The Federal Court of Arbitration of Moscow district upheld the legality of the decision of the Tenth Arbitration Appeal Court, denying the Optic-Trade the right to appeal.

As a result of the anti-corruption fund of Alexei Navalny, the owners of the land became entities controlled by the family of the General Prosecutor of the RF Chaika.

== Outside Russia ==
From the start of the 2000s, Pugachev began acquiring assets outside of Russia. He started the Luxe TV channel project, broadcasting in various languages in 20 countries. (but see Luxe.tv)

In 2007, he acquired French grocery business Hediard (the oldest and largest chain of stores in the most expensive segment), owning 320 stores in 30 countries. The analysts called this deal the "breakthrough of Russian capital into the world market" and compared it with the purchase of the Chelsea football club by Roman Abramovich in 2003. Hediard went bankrupt in 2013, and was acquired by Do & Co in 2014.

In 2008, he bought half of the company David Linley Holdings Limited, from the nephew of Queen Elizabeth II, Lord David Linley. The company specialised in the design of yachts, interiors and furniture. Linley's company became famous for designing the ninth largest yacht in the world, Lady Moura (for Saudi Prince Araviy Al-Rashid), and the interiors of the hotel Claridges in London. Pugachev wanted to involve the Linley company in the development of the Kremlevsky hotel.

In August 2009, it became public that Pugachev had purchased an American pharmaceutical company, the Biopure Corporation, the stock exchange value of which reached 3.5 billion US dollars.

In 2000, Pugachev organised production of one of the most expensive watches of the BLU brand, together with watches of Laderrer. At an auction in Monaco, part of the "Gagarin" series was sold for 360,000 euros. Allegedly, Pugachev's investment in foreign assets was the source of conflict with Putin. At a meeting at the Kremlin in 2002, Putin suggested that Pugachev come up with a legislative initiative for returning the capital exported abroad.

== Legal claims ==
In December 2013, 3 years after the withdrawal of the licence from the International Industrial Bank, the Deposit Insurance Agency brought a claim to the Moscow Court of Arbitration regarding the subsidiary's responsibility for the debts of the IIB to the former heads of the IIB: Aleksandr Didenko, Aleksei Zlobin, Marine Illarionova and Pugachev, declaring him a "de facto owner of the bank" determining the decisions taken by the bank.

Claims against Pugachev occurred in 2013, 2 years after the IIB proceedings had begun. Key members of the leadership of the IIB, such as board chairman Gerald Kowalski, did not provide witness statements. Consequently, charges mainly came in the form of guided statements of the owner of the IIB D. Henderson Stewart and former director Alexandr Didenko, who cooperated with the investigation.

Shortly after filing a lawsuit in a Moscow court, the Deposit Insurance Agency submitted an application to the High Court in London with a claim for interim measures in support of the Moscow claim. In the London courts, no independent claims were made against Pugachev.

In 2018, a London court ruled to sell the banker's property. In the late 2020 A1 investment company (part of Alfa Group) on behalf of DIA sold two luxury mansions Glebe Place and Old Battersea House for £6.5 million and £8 million respectively. Pugachev called this deal a "criminal act".

At the end of 2014, the Russian Interpol bureau posted a "wanted" notice for Pugachev. Pugachev's French lawyers complained to the Central Interpol Bureau and he was excluded from the investigation base over concerns about the political motivation of statements from the Russian side. The Russian Federation did not enter Pugachev on the Interpol wanted list.

On 22 September 2015, the Hague International tribunal officially registered the complaint of Pugachev against the Russian Federation for US$12 billion.

== Social activity ==
During his time as a senator, Pugachev financed construction of hotels, an airport, a complex and a museum filled with relics of Scythian burial mounds Arjaan-1 and Arjaan-2 in the Republic of Tuva to the amount of about 10 million dollars.

Pugachev obtained resources to build and deliver the Subedei sport complex.

In December 2008, Pugachev presented a unique collection of Scythian gold.

Galina Pugacheva (née Arkhipova) organized the charity fund "Dar" to benefit orphanages.

== Career timeline ==
- 1991 — Pugachev established one of the first cooperative banks in the USSR, the Northern Commercial Bank. In 1993 he sold his share.
- 1992 — Founded the International Industrial Bank.
- 1999 — Creation of the Yenisei Industrial Company JSC.
- 2001 — Acquisition of a 56% stake in Tretiy Kanal.
- 2002 — Exit of capital and administrations of the International Industrial Bank.
- 2002 — Acquisition of the oil company "White Nights" LLC from the Croatian state oil company INA.
- 2002 — Acquisition of oil company "Aki Otyr"
- 2002 — Acquisition of a holding of "New programmes and concepts" (established in 1998) based at Severnaya Verf, the North-Western Shipping Company and certain assets in the defence industry (Kovrov mechanical plant, OKB "Sukhoy" etc.).
- 2002 — Acquisition of shares in about 60 machine plant companies.
- 2002 — Creation of the company "Russian coal".
- 2003 — Acquisition of a controlling share in "North-Western Shipping".
- 2003 — Acquisition of land assets in the region of Rublevo-Uspensk highway in the greater Moscow area.
- Autumn 2003 — Acquisition of a minority share in Perm KB "Aircraft Engines"
- Autumn 2003 — Acquisition of a minority stake in the Perm Engine Company
- 2004 — Creation of the United Industrial Corporation JSC
- 2004 — Sale of the White Nights and Aki Otyr companies to Rosneft structures
- 2004 — Creation of the company "Russian Coal"
- 2005 — Acquisition of a controlling stake in the Severnaya Verf Shipbuilding plant JSC
- 2005 — Acquisition of a controlling stake in the Baltiyskiy Zavod JSC
- 2005 — Acquisition of the Central Design Bureau of "Iceberg"
- 2006 — Creation of the company Luxadvor S.A.
- 2006 — Acquisition of the French television channel Luxe TV.
- 2006 — Acquisition of the LLC "First Moscow watch factory "Polet"" and the right to trademark "Polet" watches.
- 2006 — RF President's Management chosen by the investors and developers of the reconstruction of the Kremlevsky JSC complex and the "United Industrial Corporation". The project for reconstruction of the Middle Trading Rows on Red Square in Moscow with anticipated opening of a five-star hotel complex "Kremlevsky". In 2009 the managers terminated the contract and passed the complex onto the Federal Protective Service.
- 2006 — United Industrial Corporation (OPK) and the Shanghai Overseas Investment Joint Stock Company (Shanghai Overseas United Investment Co. Ltd) signed a letter of intent, suggesting joint implementation of a project for complex development and construction of the land area of 56 hectares in St. Petersburg ("Vasilyevsky Island" project).
- 2007 — The government commission on investment projects approved the application of the Yenisei Industrial Company for joint financing from the RF Investment Fund for the project of constructing a railway line from Kyzyl (Tuva Republic) to Kuragino (Krasnoyarsk Territory) [127].
- 2007 — Creation of "OPK-Development" for implementation of the "Kremlevskiy" project, construction of elite housing on the Rublevo-Uspensky highway in the outer Moscow area (Gribanov project), reconstruction of the Primorskaya hotels and the Central Department Store in Sochi.
- 2007 — Acquisition by group of Hediard company.
- 2008 — Implementation of land assets for VTB structures.
- 2008 — Acquisition of the investment company Design Capital.
- 2008 — Acquisition of the French manufacturer of designer furniture, Artelano.
- 2008 — Acquisition of the British company David Linley Holdings Limited, specializing in design of yachts, interiors and furniture.
- 2008 — Acquisition of the French furniture company Forum Diffusion.
- 2009 — Acquisition of the American company Biopure Corporation and creation of "OPK Biotech" for implementation of a project for creating artificial blood substitutes.
- 2010 — Started a deal with the government concerning the sale of shares in Severnaya Verf, Baltiyskiy Zavod, the Central Design Bureau "Iceberg".
- 2011 — Sale of the "Yenisei Industrial Company" JSC to shareholders of the "Russian Copper Company" (payment under contract not made).
- 2011 — Sale of the company "Tretiy kanal" to structures of AFK "Sistema".

== Personal life ==
Pugachev became a French citizen in 2009. By 2011, Pugachev was under investigation by the Russian government for embezzling loans from the government to Mezhprombank. Pugachev argued the charges were politically motivated and left Russia to live in London, where he had a house with his partner Alexandra Tolstoy and their children.

Despite living in the UK, Pugachev was not free from legal battles, as the Russian government used the London courts to pursue money it claimed. Most of his $15 billion fortune was frozen in 2014, under a worldwide order issued by the Chancery Division of the High Court of Justice and upheld by the Court of Appeal. In June 2015, despite a court order to stay in Britain, Pugachev fled the country and turned up in Nice, France.

Pugachev has two sons from his previous marriage to Galina Arkhipova. He has three children (two sons and one daughter) with his former partner Alexandra Tolstoy (daughter of the British historian and politician Count Nikolai Tolstoy). Pugachev has five grandchildren. Pugachev and Alexandra are the subject of the documentary The Countess and the Russian Billionaire. He is married to a French woman with whom he has a daughter.

He is a Russian Orthodox Christian.

== Awards ==
- 1996: Commendation of the president of the Russian Federation B. N. Yeltsin "For a major contribution to the development of Russian democracy, creative and proactive participation in preparation and carrying out of a campaign for the national elections of the President of the Russian Federation in 1996".
- 1996: Order of Holy Prince Daniel of Moscow.
- 2005: A medal "In memory of the 1000th anniversary of Kazan".
- 2006: A medal of the Ministry of Defence for merit in the air force.
- 2008: Commendation from the president of the Republic of Tyva Government for achievements and significant contribution to the socio-economic development of the Republic of Tyva, assistance in preservation and promotion of cultural and historical heritage as an "Honoured Worker of the Republic of Tuva".
- 2008: Commendation of the chairman of the Russian Council of Federation of the Federal Assembly "For his contribution to the improvement of legislation and development of parliament in the Russian Federation".
- 2010: Order of St. Serafim of Sarov, 3rd degree.
- From 2000 to 2010, employees of the shipyards on presentation of Pugachev awarded orders and medals "For Services to the Fatherland, II degree".

== Sources ==
- Belton, Catherine (23 June 2020). Putin's People: How the KGB Took Back Russia and Then Took on the West. New York: Farrar, Straus, Giroux. ISBN 978-0374238711.
