= International Industrial Bank =

Bank of Russia

- Industry: Banking, Financial services
- Founded: 1992
- Headquarters: Moscow, Russia
- Key people: Sergey Pugachyov, Sergey Veremeenko
- Website: iib.ru

International Industrial Bank (in Russian: Международный Промышленный Банк, often abbreviated as Mezhprombank, Межпромбанк, or MPB, МПБ) is one of the largest Russian banks founded in 1992 by Sergey Pugachyov and Sergey Veremeenko.

On July 6, 2010, IIB failed to pay €200 million in maturing eurobonds. The bank is in discussions with bondholders, the Central Bank of Russia, and depositors to stabilize its deteriorating liquidity position. On 30 November 2010, a Moscow court declared the bankruptcy and the insolvency of this bank.

In 2006, the bank uncovered that OPK Trust Company based in New Zealand owns 100 percent share of it. OPK Trust Company is controlled by Sergey Pugachyov.

On November 26, 2001, Novaya Gazeta published an article by Oleg Lurie claiming that the management of the bank had been involved in money laundering in the Bank of New York. The International Industrial Bank in response brought a libel suit against the newspaper citing financial losses, as a number of its customers had allegedly changed the terms of their accounts in a loss-making way because of the publication. On February 28, 2002, the bank won the case in Moscow's Basmanny municipal court and was awarded 15 million rubles (about $500,000) in lost revenue, an unprecedented sum for Russian newspapers. In April the decision was reconfirmed by a court. However, in an article of May 27, 2002, Yulia Latynina, a journalist of Novaya Gazeta, revealed that the bank's three customers named in the lawsuit were its subsidiaries or otherwise controlled by its board of directors, and claimed that Novaya Gazeta had requested to open a criminal fraud investigation into the activities of the bank. As a result, in June 2002 the bank renounced its claim to the compensation.

In December 2010, a Russian court declared the International Industrial Bank bankrupt and initiated liquidation proceedings against IIB.

Allegedly, since 2014, the Deposit Insurance Agency of Russia (DIA) has tried to hold Segei Pugachev liable for the debts of Mezhprombank.
