= All-Russian Institute of Light Alloys =

Company based in Moscow, Russia

Coordinates: 55°43′30″N 37°23′44″E

- Company type: Open Joint Stock Company
- Founded: 1961
- Headquarters: Moscow, Russia
- Owner: Rostec
- Website: www.oaovils.ru

The All-Russian Institute of Light Alloys (Russian: Всероссийский институт лёгких сплавов «ВИЛС»), formerly the Vils Scientific Production Association is a company based in Moscow, Russia. Rostec is the largest shareholder, controlling 39% of the institute.

The VILS Scientific Production Association consists of the All-Russian Institute of Light Alloys, the Light Alloy Works, and the Zubtsov Engineering Plant. It is one of several metallurgical organizations which developed and manufactured semi-finished products from steel, aluminum, magnesium, titanium, nickel and super alloys for the Soviet Ministry of the Aviation Industry. VILS markets extrusions, forgings and semi-finished metallurgical products as well as laminated and composite materials, special coatings for tools, and designs for metallurgical equipment.

== History ==
The history of the All-Russian Institute of Light Alloys begins in 1929, when, by order of the Supreme Council of the National Economy of the USSR, the newly built special plant for the production of mail aluminum of the Gospromtsvet Trust was given the name Plant No.45.

In July 1929 under the leadership of the first director N. P. Zaborov, a plant was laid near the town of Kuntsevo, at the Setun railway platform. On July 1, 1933, the plant entered into operation of existing enterprises.

Given the particularly important defense importance of metalworking enterprises, Plant No.45 was transferred to a group of factories of military importance and equated in all respects to factories of the military industry. The products were intended primarily for the creation of fuselages of all-metal aircraft.

During the Great Patriotic War, the plant was evacuated to the Urals, to the city of Verkhnyaya Salda, where archival documents are located.

By Order of the Minister of Aviation Industry No. 96 dated February 21, 1955, a special design bureau (OKB-65) was organized at the plant to develop new technological processes for the production of parts, products and semi-finished products for aviation and engine plants and to create new equipment for aviation industry plants, which marked the beginning of a new stage in accelerating the development of special metallurgy in the USSR.

On August 24, 1961, by Order No.290 of the State Committee of the Council of Ministers of the USSR on Aviation Technology, the existing pilot plant No. 65 was given the name "All-Union Scientific Research Institute of Technology of Light and Special Alloys" (later — "All-Union Institute of Light Alloys").

By Order of the Ministry of Industry of the RSFSR dated December 16, 1991 No.170, the NGO "All-Union Institute of Light Alloys" was transformed into the "All-Russian Institute of Light Alloys".

In accordance with the order of the State Committee of the Russian Federation for State Property Management dated 01/19/1993 No.85-R on the basis of the Law of the Russian Federation "On Privatization of State and Municipal Enterprises in the Russian Federation", the State Program for Privatization of State and Municipal Enterprises of the Russian Federation for 1992, the Decree of the President of the Russian Federation "On organizational measures for the transformation of State enterprises into joint-stock companies" dated 01.07.92 No.721 the state enterprise "All-Russian Institute of Light Alloys" has been transformed into the open joint stock company "All-Russian Institute of Light Alloys".

== Manufactured products ==
JSC VILS is a unique association:

- highly qualified scientific personnel — certification testing center;
- a complex for the production of heat-resistant alloys and special steels and the production of light alloys;
- a complex of research laboratories covering the entire range of metallophysical and technological studies of light and special alloys;
- a testing center that provides a comprehensive objective assessment of semi-finished products.

With the preservation of continuity of technological reserve and scientific knowledge, the following processes are currently being implemented at the site of JSC VILS (secured by intangible assets in the form of 98 patents for inventions):

- metallurgy, includes melting and casting of ingots from aluminum, magnesium, nickel and titanium alloys;
- deformation and thermal processes include forging, volumetric stamping of blanks made of heat-resistant nickel, titanium, aluminum, magnesium alloys and pressing of long hollow shafts made of steels; hot gas-static pressing of sealed capsules filled with granules of heat-resistant nickel alloys; heat treatment of blanks made of deformable and granulated heat-resistant nickel alloys and steels;
- metallurgy of granules, includes the manufacture (spraying by PREP method) of fine granules from heat-resistant nickel and titanium alloys; filling capsules with granules, degassing, sealing capsules;
- rolled bars and wire drawing made of aluminum and titanium alloys;
- flat rolled plates, sheets and cards made of aluminum, magnesium alloys, special alloys and bimetal;
- pressing (extrusion) of profiles and pipes made of light alloys.

The production activity of JSC VILS is focused on the manufacture of semi-finished products from aluminum, titanium, magnesium, heat-resistant nickel and special alloys for various industries. The main product range is represented by the following product groups:

- cast rod blanks for the manufacture of blades of gas turbine engines for aviation and ground applications;
- intermetallic alloys operating in temperature limits for titanium;
- blanks of disks/glitters made of titanium alloy granules, titanium rods, wire for fasteners in aircraft construction;
- pellet blanks for discs of gas turbine engines of the IV and V generation.

Also JSC VILS develops and manufactures:

- long thin-walled hollow shafts with flanges made of special steels and heat-resistant nickel alloys;
- large-sized discs with a diameter of up to 1200 mm for a new generation of industrial gas turbine drives for electric generators, gas superchargers and marine engines;
- pipe blanks made of titanium alloys VT1-0/VT6 for nuclear and shipbuilding equipment;
- rolled sheets made of magnesium alloys and bimetals, including a full technological cycle of casting, rolling and finishing of sheets, plates;
- forged aluminum and magnesium blanks for the automotive and aviation industries;
- granules and powders based on nickel, titanium and other alloys for various purposes;
- promising materials for alternative energy sources.

The product lines are grouped by alloys and in the subsections carry the processing principle from metallurgical semi-finished products to products with an increasing share of added value (the list of products is presented on the website of JSC VILS).

== Owners and management ==
Equity distribution of shareholders:

- 39% — RT-Design Technologies JSC, a subsidiary of Rostec State Corporation;
- 28,29% — Stoyanov and Partners Law Office, Moscow
- 16,29% — Veremeenko Sergey Alekseevich
- 12,00% — Central Commercial Bank LLC
- 39.00% - Purchased from RT-Project Technologies in 2019 (the final beneficiary is A.V. Koshelev)
- 4,43% — other shareholders

Management of JSC "VILS":

- CEO — Chechulin Dmitry Mikhailovich
