= Veremeenko =

Veremeenko or Verameyenka (Belarusian: Верамеенка, Russian: Веремеенко) is a gender-neutral Slavic surname that may refer to

- Anastasiya Verameyenka (born 1987), Belarusian basketball player
- Sergey Veremeenko (born 1955), Russian businessman
- Vladimir Veremeenko (born 1984), Belarusian basketball player, brother of Anastasiya
