= Novaya Gazeta =

Russian independent newspaper

- Type: Triweekly – Monday, Wednesday, Friday
- Format: A2 per spread
- Owners: Novaya Gazeta Publishing House (76%); Alexander Lebedev (14%); Mikhail Gorbachev (10%, 2006–2022)
- Founder: Group of former journalists from Komsomolskaya Pravda
- Publisher: ANO RID Novaya Gazeta
- Editor-in-chief: Sergei Sokolov
- Launched: 1 April 1993; 7 April 2022 (Novaya Gazeta Europe)
- Ceased publication: 9 November 2026
- Language: Russian, English
- Headquarters: Moscow (formerly)
- Country: Russia
- Circulation: 108,000 (print); 613,000 (online) (as of 2023)
- ISSN: 1682-7384 (print); 1606-4828 (web)
- OCLC number: 58481623
- Website: novayagazeta.ru
- Free online archives: novayagazeta.ru/issues

Novaya Gazeta (Russian: «Новая газета», lit. 'New Gazette', pronounced [ˈnovəjə ɡɐˈzʲetə]) was an independent Russian newspaper. It became known for its critical and investigative coverage of Russian political and social affairs, the Chechen wars, corruption among the ruling elite, and increasing authoritarianism in Russia. It was published in Moscow with print editions on Mondays, Wednesdays, and Fridays until shortly after the beginning of the 2022 Russian invasion of Ukraine, after which Novaya Gazeta appeared online only. English-language articles on the website were published on a weekly basis in the form of the Russia, Explained newsletter. As of 2023, the newspaper had a daily print circulation of 108,000, and online visits of 613,000.

Seven Novaya Gazeta journalists have been murdered since 2000, including Yuri Shchekochikhin, Anna Politkovskaya, and Anastasia Baburova, in connection with their investigations. In October 2021, Novaya Gazeta's editor-in-chief Dmitry Muratov was awarded the Nobel Peace Prize, alongside Maria Ressa, for their safeguarding of freedom of expression in their homelands.

In March 2022, during the Russian invasion of Ukraine, the newspaper suspended print publication within Russia due to increased government censorship. The next month, an independent sister publication based in Latvia, Novaya Gazeta Europe, was created in order to avoid censorship; the website was blocked in Russia later that month. In July, the newspaper launched a magazine, Novaya Rasskaz-Gazeta, with its website blocked shortly afterwards. In September, Russian authorities revoked Novaya Gazeta's Russian media license. The newspaper closed on 9 November 2026, with an announcement by Novaya Gazeta citing repression from Russian authorities. Novaya Gazeta Europe is anticipated to continue publishing.

== History ==
=== 1990s ===
A group of former journalists from Komsomolskaya Pravda organised the newspaper in 1993. Its first name was Ezhednevnaya Novaya Gazeta (Daily New Gazette). Mikhail Gorbachev used the money from his 1990 Nobel Peace Prize to help establish Novaya Gazeta and purchase its first computers.

=== 2000s ===
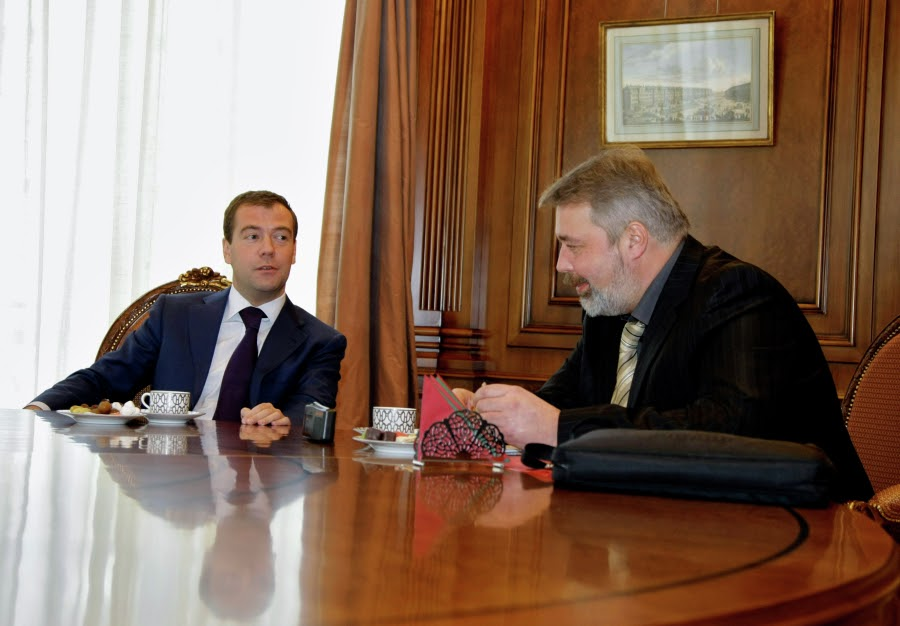
Dmitry Muratov interviewing Russian President Dmitry Medvedev in 2009

On 26 November 2001, Novaya Gazeta published an article by Oleg Lurie stating that the management of the International Industrial Bank, headed by Sergey Pugachyov, had been involved in money laundering through the Bank of New York. Pugachyov's bank brought a libel suit against the newspaper, citing financial losses, as a number of its customers had allegedly changed the terms of their accounts in a way which made the bank lose money because of the publication of the article. On 28 February 2002, the bank won the case in Moscow's Basmanny municipal court, and was awarded 15 million rubles (about $500,000) in lost revenue, an unprecedented sum for Russian newspapers that might undermine the very existence of Novaya Gazeta, especially as on 22 February Novaya Gazeta had been ordered by the same Basmanny court to pay about $1 million for a corruption allegation against the Krasnodar Krai's top judge. In April, the decision in the International Industrial Bank case was reconfirmed by a court. However, in a 27 May article, Yulia Latynina, a Novaya Gazeta journalist, revealed that the bank's three customers who had been named in the lawsuit were its subsidiaries or otherwise controlled by its board of directors, and claimed that Novaya Gazeta had requested that a criminal fraud investigation be opened into the activities of the bank. As a result, in June the International Industrial Bank renounced its claim to the compensation.

In 2004, the newspaper printed seven articles by columnist Georgy Rozhnov which accused Sergey Kiriyenko of embezzling US$4.8 billion of International Monetary Fund moneys in 1998 when he was Prime Minister of Russia. The newspaper based the accusations on a letter allegedly written to Colin Powell and signed by U.S. Congressmen Philip Crane, Mike Pence, Charlie Norwood, Dan Burton, and Henry Bonilla, and posted on the website of the American Defense Council. The newspaper claimed that Kiriyenko had used some of the embezzled funds to purchase real estate in the United States. The letter was found to be fake. Kiriyenko sued Novaya Gazeta and Rozhnov for libel, and in passing judgment in favour of Kiriyenko the court ordered Novaya Gazeta to retract all publications relating to the accusations and went on to say that the newspaper "is obliged to publish only officially proven information linking Mr Kiriyenko with embezzlement."

On 13 April 2009, the newspaper was granted the first-ever print interview in a Russian publication with President Dmitry Medvedev, in which he discussed issues such as civil society and the social contract, transparency of public officials, and Internet development.

=== 2010–2021: cyber attack and investigative reporting ===
Website logo

On 26 January 2010, the paper's website was subjected to a denial-of-service cyber attack, and effectively taken offline. As of 1 February 2010, the site was still inaccessible. At the peak of the attack the server was receiving 1.5 million connections per second. The newspaper maintained its online presence by publishing articles on its page on LiveJournal, a Russian-owned social networking service. On 7 April 2011, the website was targeted again with the same botnet that appeared to be used in a large-scale attack on LiveJournal, which hosted many opposition blogs.

On 25 July 2014, the paper opened with the headline "Vergeef ons, Nederland" / "Прости, Голландия" ("Forgive us, Netherlands" in both Dutch and Russian), in response to the Malaysia Airlines Flight 17 disaster.

In early 2016 the newspaper published an article alleging the existence of a so-called "Blue Whale" game, a social network phenomenon reportedly consisting of a series of initially innocuous tasks assigned to players by administrators, before elements of self-harm are introduced, culminating in a final challenge requiring the player to commit suicide. The publication of the article caused a moral panic to sweep Russia.

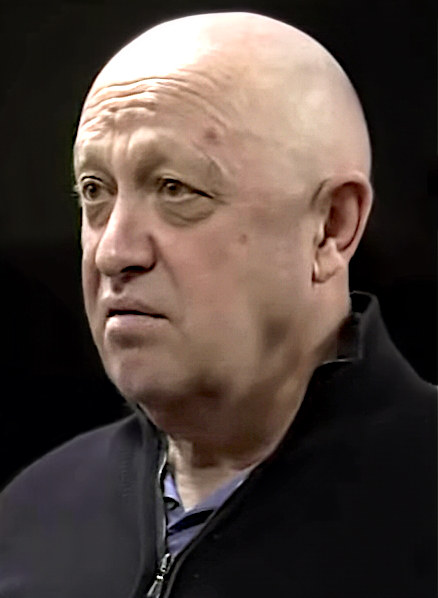
Russian mercenary leader and oligarch Yevgeny Prigozhin, subject of an investigation by the newspaper

After Novaya Gazeta published an investigation in October 2018 by journalist Denis Korotkov about Russian mercenary leader and oligarch Yevgeny Prigozhin, Korotkov and the Novaya Gazeta editor-in-chief were the target of threatening deliveries of a severed ram's head and funeral flowers to the newspaper's offices. The style of the threat resembled others by Kremlin-linked Prigozhin.

In 2017 Novaya Gazeta published reports about anti-gay purges in Chechnya, where 3 men were allegedly killed, and dozens detained and intimidated. After publication, the Chechen government denied the existence of persecutions in the Republic. The newspaper published a report by Elena Milashina and a list of 27 Chechens killed on 26 January. The newspaper also addressed the report and the list to the Investigative Committee of Russia, and asked the committee to investigate the matter. While Novaya Gazeta published the names of 27 killed Chechens in the list, the newspaper said that the real number might be even more, possibly 56. The newspaper said that the allegedly killed Chechens were detained by the local security service, put in custody inside guarded territory owned by the Grozny traffic police regiment, and executed on 26 January both by gunfire and by asphyxiation by State Security forces without filing any legal accusations.

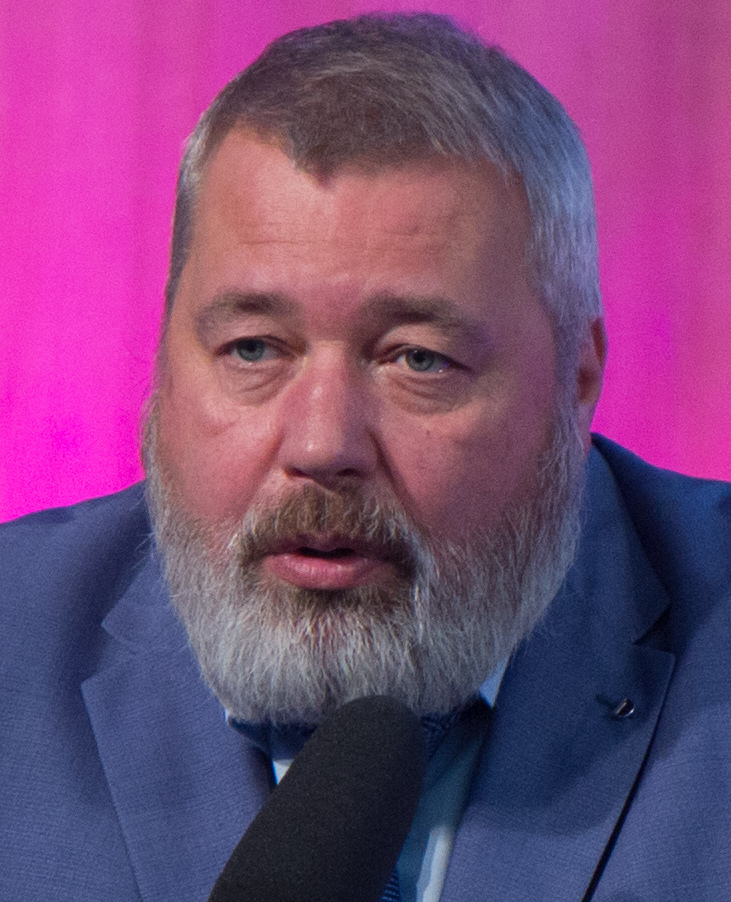
Editor-in-chief Dmitry Muratov, who was awarded the 2021 Nobel Peace Prize

In October 2021, Novaya Gazeta's editor-in-chief Dmitry Muratov was awarded the Nobel Peace Prize, alongside Maria Ressa, for their safeguarding of freedom of expression in their homelands.

=== 2022–2026: Novaya Gazeta Europe ===
Following the start of the 2022 Russian invasion of Ukraine, editor-in-chief Dmitry Muratov stated that the newspaper would publish an edition in both Russian and Ukrainian in solidarity. On 4 March, after receiving an official warning from Roskomnadzor, the Russian federal agency responsible for censoring Russian mass media, the newspaper said it would remove materials and cut reporting on the war. It published materials from occupied Kherson and other Ukrainian cities. On 28 March, after it received another warning from Roskomnadzor, the newspaper announced that it would suspend its online and print activities until the end of the "special military operation".

On 7 April, as a result of the crackdown, journalists from Novaya Gazeta announced the launch of Novaya Gazeta Europe, with its editor-in-chief, Kirill Martynov, stating that Novaya Gazeta Europe would be independent from Novaya Gazeta "both legally and in practice", with its newsroom consisting of staffers who had left Russia. The new outlet would publish articles in other languages aside from Russian, and Martynov stated that the journalists hoped to eventually resume their work in Moscow. On 29 April, Novaya Gazeta Europe announced that its website had been blocked in Russia. On 15 July, staff launched the magazine Novaya Rasskaz-Gazeta, with its first issue containing analysis of Putin's ideology; however by 24 July, the website was blocked in Russia.

On 6 May, the first print issue of Novaya Gazeta Europe appeared on newsstands in Riga, Latvia, and online at novayagazeta.eu. The print version is handled by Latvian publishing house Rīgas Viļņi.

On 28 July, Roskomnadzor demanded that Novaya Gazeta's media license be cancelled, claiming that "the editorial office was not providing its editorial statute within the timeframe established by the law on media". On 5 September, the Basmanny District Court in Moscow cancelled the newspaper's license in Russia, which Muratov called "political". That same month the Russian Supreme Court revoked Novaya Gazeta's online license, making it no longer available on the internet in Russia.

On 28 June 2023, the Prosecutor-General of Russia designated Novaya Gazeta Europe as an undesirable organisation.

As of 2023, the newspaper had a daily print circulation of 108,000, and online visits of 613,000. The newspaper first opened an office in Latvia, next in Germany, and, in 2024, in Paris.

In 2024, the documentary, Of Caravan and the Dogs, was released. The film uses videos from several months before the Russian invasion of Ukraine until Novaya Gazeta, Radio Echo of Moscow, and TV Rain closed down and its staff fled to other countries for their safety.

=== 2026: raids and closure ===
On 9 April 2026, Russian police raided the newspaper's headquarters.

In September, the Ministry of Justice designated Novaya Gazeta as a "foreign agent". According to editor-in-chief Sergey Sokolov, Russian banks subsequently refused to process readers' donations, effectively cutting off the newspaper's primary source of funding.

On 15 October, investigators raided editor-in-chief Sergei Sokolov's Moscow home. Sokolov was taken to the Investigative Committee for questioning and held there for approximately three hours.

On 28 October Russian authorities announced the closure of the newspaper's headquarters, where editorial staff had operated for the past 29 years.

On 30 October, Novaya Gazeta announced that it would cease operations on 9 November. The newspaper stated that it would shut down its servers and vacate its Moscow offices. Novaya Gazeta attributed the closure to increased pressure from Russian authorities. The announcement followed the eviction of the newspaper from its Moscow headquarters.

== Key people ==
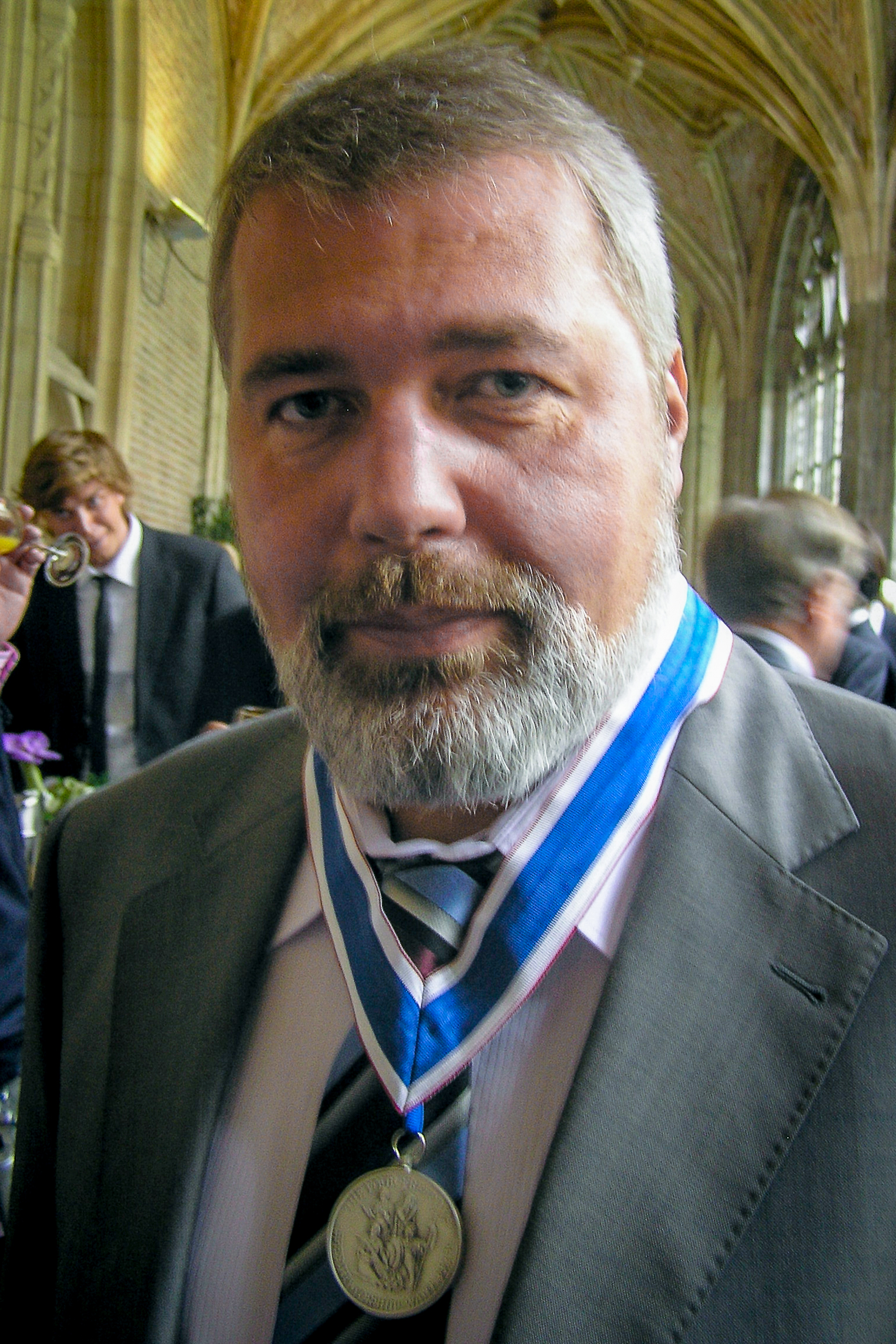
Editor-in-chief Muratov shortly after receiving the Four Freedoms Award on behalf of Novaya Gazeta in 2010

In a video posted by Novaya Gazeta on YouTube in January 2017, editor-in-chief Dmitry Muratov revealed that the newspaper's employees jointly owned 76% of its shares, while the remaining 24% were owned by Alexander Lebedev (14%) and Mikhail Gorbachev (10%).

Since 2009, the newspaper's editor-in-chief was elected every second year by the editorial staff in a secret ballot. A few days before the November 2017 election, Muratov announced that he would not stand, as he felt that there was need for a change after his 22 years in the position, but that he would continue to work for the newspaper. He was replaced by Sergey Kozheurov, the general director of the newspaper and its first editor-in-chief. However, Muratov was re-elected again in November 2019.

== Deaths and attacks on journalists ==
Igor Domnikov was well known in Novaya Gazeta for his witty essays and acerbic tone. He was attacked near the doorway of his Moscow apartment, on 12 May 2000. Hit with a hard object, presumably a hammer, by an unknown assailant, he was lying unconscious in a pool of his own blood when he was found by a neighbor. Domnikov was delivered to a hospital with skull and brain injuries, and underwent surgery, but remained in a coma. He died from his injuries on 16 July. Five gang members were arrested in August 2007 on suspicion of murder, and were sentenced to prison terms ranging from 18 years to life for his murder as well as other crimes. On 11 March 2015, former Deputy Governor of Lipetsk Oblast Sergei Dorovskoi was charged by the Investigative Committee of Russia with inciting the murder, but Dorovskoi was never punished because of the statute of limitations. Investigations have found that Domnikov had written a series of reports about life in the Lipetsk region in 1999–2000, in which he criticized the local government for corruption; investigators found that this motivated Dorovskoi to incite others to kill the journalist.

Viktor Popkov, a contributor for the newspaper, was shot dead in Chechnya in 2001.

Yury Shchekochikhin, a journalist and a deputy in the State Duma, had also worked for the newspaper as an investigative journalist and had been a deputy Editor-in-Chief until he died from a mysterious and severe allergy on 3 July 2003. Some of his contributions published in Novaya Gazeta were related to the investigation of the Three Whales Corruption Scandal.

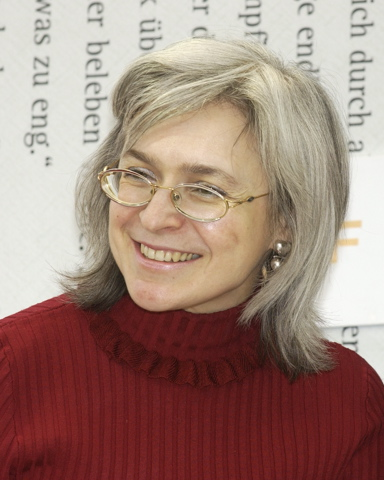
Journalist Anna Politkovskaya

Journalist Anna Politkovskaya, who was highly critical of Putin and of Russia's actions in Chechnya, wrote for Novaya Gazeta until her assassination when she was shot dead in her Moscow apartment on 7 October 2006, Putin's birthday. Politkovskaya wrote in an essay that the editors received: "Visitors every day in our editorial office who have nowhere else to bring their troubles, because the Kremlin finds their stories off-message, so that the only place they can be aired is in our newspaper, Novaya Gazeta." Vyacheslav Izmailov, a retired army major who was a military correspondent, was part of the team investigating her death, and in 2007 claimed to know who had ordered her death. Fifteen years after her murder, Novaya Gazeta released a short film investigating her death, and documenting failures at every level of the subsequent investigation. In November 2023, President Vladimir Putin pardoned a former law-enforcement officer involved in the murder, for serving in a Russian penal military unit.

Journalist and human rights lawyer Stanislav Markelov was shot and killed in Moscow on 19 January 2009 while leaving a press conference about his last minute appeal against the early release of Yuri Budanov, a former Russian military officer convicted for kidnapping and aggravated murder of a young Chechen woman. Anastasia Baburova, a freelance journalist for Novaya Gazeta and a member of Autonomous Action, was with Markelov at the time and was shot in the head and also killed.

Natalya Estemirova, a human rights researcher and lawyer who lived in the Chechnya, had sometimes met journalist Anna Politkovskaya and lawyer Stanislav Markelov, because they all were investigating crimes in Chechnya and defending victims' rights. She also wrote reports in Novaya Gazeta. Estemirova was kidnapped from a sidewalk on 22 July 2009 in the Chechnyan capital Grozny, and two hours later was killed and her bullet-riddled body was found in the neighboring Ingushetia Republic.

In 2018, three journalists of Novaya Gazeta, Kirill Radchenko, Alexander Rastorguyev, and Orkhan Dzhemal, were killed in an ambush outside the town of Sibut in the Central African Republic. They were engaged in investigations of the Russian mercenary involvement in the Central African Republic through the Wagner Group.

On 7 April 2022, Muratov was attacked by an unknown person and covered with red paint while on a train from Moscow to Samara, supposedly with the attack reflecting the attacker's support of Russian troops. Muratov said the attacker had shouted "Muratov, here’s one for our boys". He said his eyes were "burning terribly" after the attack, and posted a selfie showing the effects of the attack. The substance was red paint containing acetone. A declassified United States intelligence report concluded the attackers were part of an unnamed Russian intelligence unit.

== Inserts ==
Svobodnoe Prostranstvo ("Free Space", Russian: Свободное Пространство), which had been a colour supplement to Novaya Gazeta, was included in the Friday issue as of 2008. Novaya Gazeta also published The New York Times International Weekly on Fridays from 2009 onwards. This eight-page supplement featured a selection of articles from The New York Times translated into Russian.

Novaya Gazeta regularly contained free inserts of its side-projects or other newly launched newspapers. The United Civil Front (by the corresponding organisation) and Yabloko's newspaper were published in the form of inserts in the past. At the time of its closure, inserts included the Shofyor ("Driver" or "chauffeur", Russian: Шофёр) side project and the popular science Kentavr ("Centaur", Russian: Кентавр).

== Awards ==
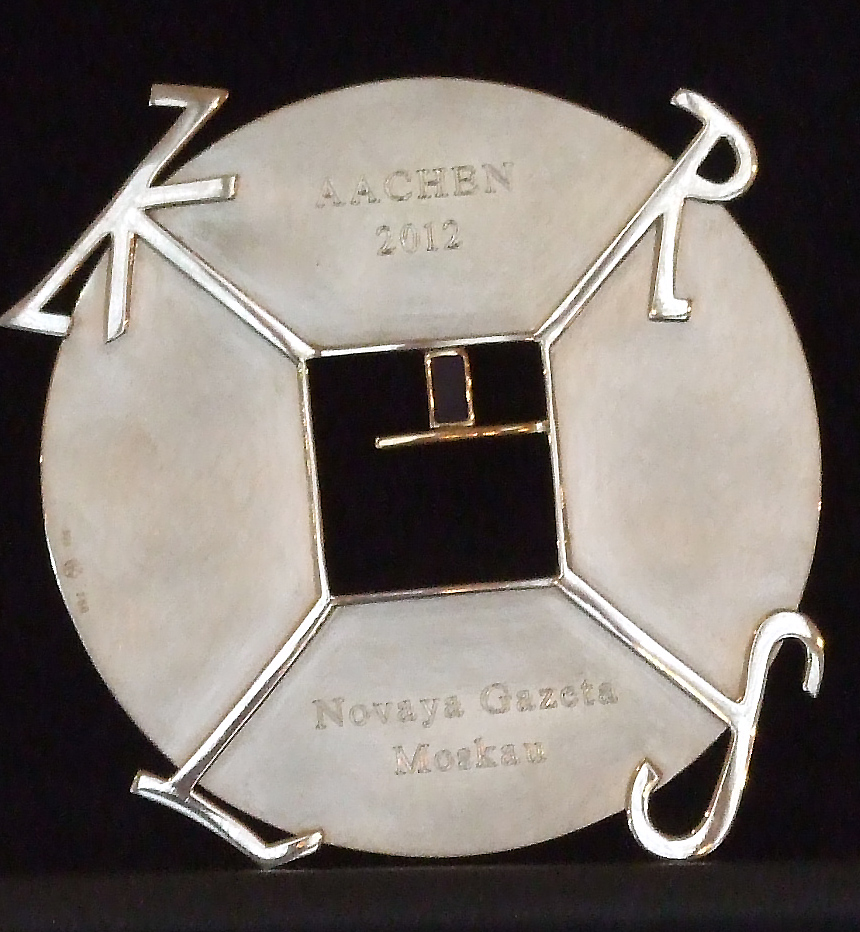
2012 Charlemagne Award for the European Media

- Bucerius Free Press of Eastern Europe Award (2002).
- The Golden Pen of St. Petersburg-2003 (Nikolay Donskov; 2004).
- The Writers in Translation (Anna Politkovskaya; 2004).
- Club-25 Prize (Anna Politkovskaya; 2007).
- The Writers in Translation (Arkady Babchenko; 2007).
- The Henri Nannen Prize in 2007.
- Free Media Pioneer Award (2009).
- International Press Freedom Award from Canadian Journalists for Free Expression (2009).
- Transparency International Integrity Award (Roman Shleynov; 2009).
- Gerd Bucerius Prize for Free Press in Eastern Europe (Roman Shleynov; 2009).
- Artyom Borovik Prize (Arkady Babchenko, Sergey Kanev; 2009).
- The Four Freedoms Award for Freedom of Speech in 2010.
- Lev Kopelev Prize (2010).
- Golden Gong-2010.
- Charlemagne Award for the European Media (2012).
- On 27 October 2014 in Copenhagen newspaper's press-secretary Nadezhda Prusenkova and co-editor-in-chief Vitali Yaroshevsky were presented with the Freedom Award of Politiken for the independent and critical reporting of Novaya Gazeta that has cost the lives of six of its journalists.
- Andrei Sakharov Freedom Award (2017).
- Awards of the Government of the Russian Federation in the field of mass media (Galina Mursalieva, Olga Bobrova; 2018).
- Golden pen of Russia (Galina Mursalieva, 2020).
- Nobel Peace Prize (Dmitry Muratov, 2021)

== See also ==
- List of newspapers in Russia
- Meduza
