= Ruslan Baisarov =

Russian businessman (born 1968)

Ruslan Baysarov
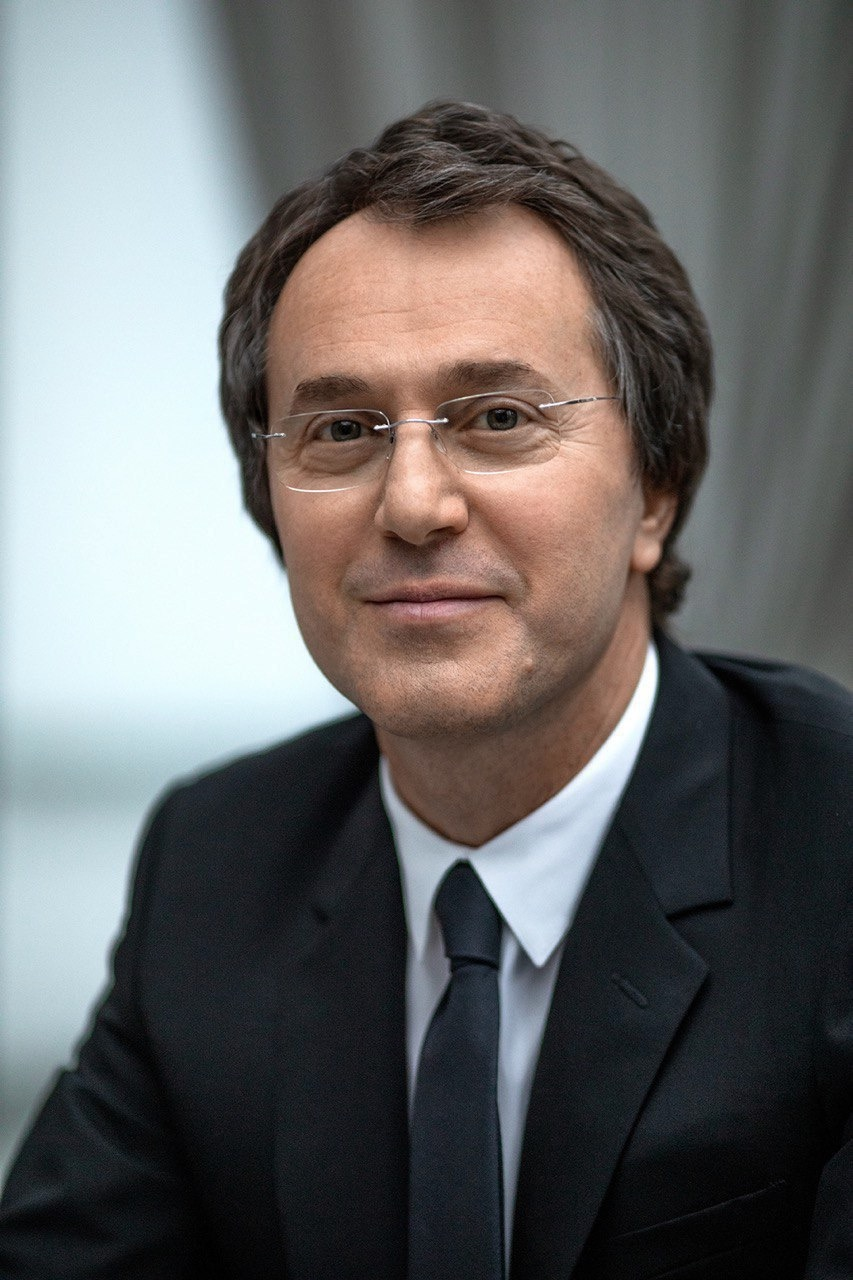
- Born: Ruslan Sulimovich Baisarov; 9 August 1968 (age 58); Prigorodnoye, Groznensky District, Chechen-Ingush ASSR, Russian SFSR, Soviet Union
- Occupation: Businessman
- Children: 6

Ruslan Sulimovich Baysarov (Russian: Руслан Сулимович Байса́ров; born August 9, 1968, in Prigorodnoye, Russian SFSR, Soviet Union) is a Russian businessman of Chechen descent. Baysarov is the owner and general director of the Tuva Energy Industrial Corporation.

In 2019 he was listed among Forbes Magazine's 200 Richest Businessmen in Russia, with net worth estimated at $500 million.

== Early life and education ==
Baysarov was born on August 9, 1968, in Prigorodnoye village, which is in the Grozny district, Russia, to Chechens Sulim and Kasirat Baysarov. He is one of many siblings. After graduating from school in 1985 and supported himself by reselling imported computers adapted for Russian-speaking users. He served in the army from 1986 to 1988, and upon his return transferred to the Oil Institute in Grozny, graduating in 1996 with a degree in engineering economics. In 2001, he received a master's degree in sociology from Moscow State University. In 2018, Baisarov received a Ph.D. in technical sciences from the National University of Science and Technology MiSiS.

== Business career ==
In the early 2000s he entered the oil business when he joined the Russian Fuel Union's board of directors. From 2001 until 2004 he served as vice-president of the Moscow Fuel Company, formerly named the Association of Independent Gasoline Stations. He then became vice-president of the Moscow Oil and Gas Company in 2005 and first vice-president of the company in 2007, a role which he kept until 2010.

=== Tuva Energy Industrial Corporation ===
In 2011 he became owner and general director of the Tuva Energy Industrial Corporation (TEPK). In 2013, the company obtained a license to develop the Elegest coal mine, one of the largest in Russia, with a total area of 84 km2 and reserves of 855 million t of coal. In April 2018, TEPK entered a 30-year concession agreement with the Russian government, according to which TEPK Kyzyl-Kuragino, a subsidiary of TEPK, would lead the development and operation of the Elegest-Kyzyl-Kuragino railroad. In April 2019, TEPK Kyzyl–Kuragino entered an agreement with Russian Railways, making the state-owned railway company the official general contractor for the construction of the Elegest-Kyzyl–Kuragino line. The integrated development project of the Elegest coal mine includes the construction of a coal terminal port in Khabarovsk Krai scheduled to be officially commissioned in the third quarter of 2023.

=== Bamtonnelstroy-Most Group of Companies ===
In 2015, Baisarov acquired 25% of the SK Most Group of Companies (since October 2021 — Bamtonnelstroy-Most Group of Companies (BTS-MOST)), a major Russian construction corporation, and in 2016 he became controlling shareholder (56%) and assumed the post of chairman of the board of directors.

In December 2016, SK Most Group of Companies began building a double-lane highway cable-stayed bridge in the Blagoveshchensky district of Amur Oblast, connecting between Blagoveshchensk, Russia and Heihe, China across the Amur River. Russia's investment in the project is estimated at 14 billion rubles and China's is estimated at 5.2 billion. The bridge is scheduled to open at the end of 2019. Tongjiang-Nizhneleninskoye railway bridge, the first railway bridge over the Amur River, connecting Russia and China, was partially completed in 2019.

In 2017, SK Most Group of Companies began working on broadening the Sakhalin Oblast region railroad section of the Far Eastern Railway. The project is to be completed by 2020.

In January 2019, the company completed the construction of a number of units in the, Sabetta Arctic Port, which is part of the large-scale Yamal LNG project. As part of the Baikal–Amur Mainline and Trans-Siberian Railway modernization project, SK Most Group of Companies is involved in the construction of the second line of the Baikal tunnel, which will double the carrying capacity of the site and significantly expand the rail traffic volume of the East Siberian Railway.

Since 2017, SK Most Group of Companies had been involved in the construction of large (length of 2,936 meters) and small (length of 329 meters) viaducts on the Stara Pazova — Novi Sad section as part of the reconstruction and modernization of the Belgrade — State Border double-track railway in the Republic of Serbia. In April 2020, during a visit to the construction site, Serbian President Aleksandar Vucic called one of the viaducts 'the most beautiful' and expressed great gratitude to the workers of SK Most for their professionalism, saying 'we are building a future that will remain in history’. In 2021, the construction of the viaducts was completed.

=== E-commerce ===
In 2016, Baisarov proposed the creation of a nationwide marketplace similar to the Chinese Alibaba as well as a payment system that would compete with Visa and MasterCard in the Russian Federation. According to the businessman, this platform should have ensured the transparency of the public procurement system, support for small and medium-sized businesses by providing access to foreign and Russian markets through the platform. However, the idea was rejected by the Ministry of Economic Development. In August 2016 he provided a loan to PimPay, a Russian fintech services company. In September 2016, the main owner of the company, Evgeny Chernov, pledged his share (84.55%) to Baysarov as security for the loan. According to the company, in August 2018, 2.5 thousand online stores used its services, which each month send about 700 thousand orders to customers for a total amount of over 3 billion rubles.

=== Sanctions ===
He was sanctioned by the UK government in 2022 in relation to the Russo-Ukrainian War.

== Personal life ==
Baisarov is married and the father of six children.

In a 2009 charity auction, Baisarov acquired the right to cast a female role in the film Stalingrad by Russian director Fyodor Bondarchuk for €200,000. The money went to support children suffering from cancer.
