= The Tomb (2009 film) =

- Film poster
- Directed by: Michael Staininger
- Written by: Jeff Most
- Based on: "Ligeia" by Edgar Allan Poe
- Produced by: Donald P. Borchers; Jeff Most
- Starring: Wes Bentley; Sofya Skya; Kaitlin Doubleday; Michael Madsen; Eric Roberts
- Cinematography: Jamie Thompson
- Edited by: Danny Saphire
- Music by: Patrick Cassidy
- Production companies: Most Films; Saphire-Borchers; Aberto Entertainment
- Distributed by: Universal Studios
- Release date: November 13, 2009 (St. Louis)
- Running time: 92 minutes
- Country: United States
- Language: English

The Tomb, also known as Edgar Allan Poe's Ligeia, is a 2009 horror film directed by Michael Staininger and starring Wes Bentley, Sofya Skya, Kaitlin Doubleday, Michael Madsen, and Eric Roberts. It is based on the short story "Ligeia" by Edgar Allan Poe.

== Plot ==
Jonathan Merrick, a best-seller author, falls in love with a fascinating woman named Ligeia. But she keeps a deadly secret, she is ill and she needs to steal souls to survive. In her quest for immortality she will do anything to keep death away. Jonathan, haunted by her beauty, breaks up with his girlfriend Rowena. Ligeia and Merrick take a house on the shores of the Black Sea and he enters into a dark and hopeless world.

== Cast ==
- Wes Bentley as Jonathan Merrick
- Sofya Skya as Ligeia
- Kaitlin Doubleday as Rowena
- Mackenzie Rosman as Lorelei
- Christa Campbell as Mrs. Burris
- Cary-Hiroyuki Tagawa as Mr. Burris
- Eric Roberts as Vaslov
- Michael Madsen as George
- Lydia Hull as The Bartender

== Release ==
The film premiered at the 2009 St. Louis International Film Festival.

== See also ==
- Roger Corman
- Edgar Allan Poe in television and film
