= Alexandra Tolstoy =

British equine adventurer, broadcaster, and businesswoman (born 1973)

Alexandra Tolstoy FRGS
- Born: Alexandra Nikolaevna Tolstoy-Miloslavsky; 14 July 1973 (age 53); Poole, Dorset, England
- Noble family: Tolstoy
- Spouses: Shamil Galimzyanov (m. 2003; div. 2009); Sergei Pugachev (m. 2008; sep. 2015)
- Issue: 3
- Father: Nikolai Tolstoy
- Mother: Georgina Brown
- Occupation: Equine adventurer, broadcaster, businesswoman, socialite

Alexandra Nikolaevna Tolstoy-Miloslavsky FRGS (Russian: Толста́я-Милосла́вская, romanized: Tolstaya-Miloslavskaya; born 14 July 1973) is a British equine adventurer, broadcaster, socialite, and businesswoman. She has made several long distance journeys on horses which have provided the material for television documentaries, books, and talks.

== Early life ==
Tolstoy is the daughter of Nikolai Tolstoy and Georgina Brown. She was born in Poole, Dorset. She is the older sister of Xenia Sackville. Tolstoy was educated at Downe House, and then studied for a Master of Arts degree in Russian at the University of Edinburgh, during the course of which she spent a year in Russia.

She next moved to London, joining Credit Suisse First Boston's graduate scheme as an Eastern European Equities broker. She resigned after a year and spent the next two years working and travelling abroad, including six weeks walking the old Camino de Santiago pilgrimage route through Spain.

== Career ==
In 1999, Tolstoy was part of a team which spent eight months travelling by horse and camel along an 8 000 km length of the Silk Road. One of the support team members, an Uzbek show jumper, Shamil Galimzyanov, was to become her husband. After the expedition, Tolstoy moved to Moscow to complete her account of the expedition, The Last Secrets of the Silk Road, and to continue travelling in central Asia. In 2000, Tolstoy and a friend rode 4 800 km on horseback through Mongolia and Siberia.

In 2004, she and Galimzyanov embarked upon the 4 350 km journey from Turkmenistan to Moscow, retracing an expedition undertaken by twenty-eight Turkmen riders in 1935, who took 84 days to cover the distance. Riding Akhal-Teke horses, they were stopped from completing the journey by an outbreak of foot-and-mouth disease, but resumed it in 2006 and arrived in Moscow in November.

In 2008, she spent a month filming Horse People with Alexandra Tolstoy, a BBC Television series in which she visited five different communities working with horses around the world. The BBC was hoping for more television work, with a spokesman commenting "Alexandra's Horse People was very popular and she could well do more". The series generated controversy for its graphic depiction of a horse being killed for its meat.

Tolstoy was reported in 2009 to be considering making a series about high society in contemporary Russia.

When not travelling on her own expeditions, Tolstoy continues to write, organises riding holidays in Central Asia, and works both as an interior designer and for BDI, a brand development company assisting European companies to develop their business in the countries of the former Soviet Union.

== Personal life ==
In September 2003, Tolstoy and Uzbek show jumper Shamil Galimzyanov were married in the Russian Orthodox Cathedral in Bayswater, London, after which they set up their home in a small Moscow apartment. While filming Horse People with Alexandra Tolstoy in 2008, the BBC objected to Galimzyanov accompanying Tolstoy, and this was later reported to have tested the marriage.

While living in Moscow, Tolstoy taught English to the families of several "oligarchs" and befriended the billionaire Sergei Pugachev.

Tolstoy's marriage to Galimzyanov broke down in 2009, shortly after the birth of a baby boy. Tolstoy decided not to return to her former home in Moscow and in April 2009 established herself with her son at a house in Chelsea. In June 2009, she was reported to have engaged "highly paid lawyers" to protect her private life.

In the summer of 2009, Tolstoy was staying with Pugachev at a villa in the South of France and was also helping him to find a country estate in England. In December, she acquired a farmhouse near Malvern in Herefordshire for herself. Her distant cousin Alexander Nekrassov broke the news that Pugachev was the father of Tolstoy's son.

By 2011, Tolstoy and Pugachev were reported to be a couple, with homes in Monaco, London, and Moscow, but Pugachev, by then living in exile in London, remained married to his wife Galina, with whom he has children and grandchildren. In 2010, the couple had another son, and in 2012 a daughter.

In 2013, Galimzyanov complained that Tolstoy was evicting him from the Moscow flat they had lived in together. In 2015, Pugachev moved to the south of France, after facing severe business difficulties in Russia, while Tolstoy remained in London with their children.

In 2017, Tolstoy described Pugachev as controlling and feared that he might kidnap the children. In October 2018, she said in an interview that she was a single mother and stated that Pugachev had not supported her or the children financially for three years.

In 2023, Tolstoy announced that her bank account was closed by NatWest without any explanations.

== Filmography ==
- Horse People with Alexandra Tolstoy (2009)

== Publications ==
- The Last Secrets of the Silk Road: Four Girls Follow Marco Polo Across 5,000 Miles (London: Profile Books, 2003) ISBN 978-1-86197-379-5
- The Horses of Heaven (2009)
