= Galina Munzuk =

Russian politician (born 1955)

- Галина Мунзук

Senator from Tuva
- In office 2 April 2011 – 5 October 2014
- Preceded by: Sergei Pugachev
- Succeeded by: Mergen Oorzhak

Personal details
- Born: Galina Munzuk; 26 September 1955 (age 71) Kyzyl, Tuvan Autonomous Oblast, Russian SFSR, Soviet Union
- Education: Boris Shchukin Theatre Institute

Galina Maksimovna Munzuk (Russian: Галина Максимовна Мунзук; born 11 December 1955) is a Russian politician who served as a senator from Tuva from 2011 to 2014.

== Career ==
Galina Munzuk was born on 26 September 1955 in Kyzyl, Tuvan Autonomous Oblast. Her father is Maxim Munzuk. Later, she graduated from the Boris Shchukin Theatre Institute. From 2008 to 2011, she served as a deputy at the Great Khural of Tuva. From April 2011 to October 2014 Munzuk represented Tuva in the Federation Council.

She is under sanctions introduced by Ukraine for approving the annexation of Crimea.
