= Shadows in Paradise (2010 film) =

- Directed by: J. Stephen Maunder
- Written by: J. Stephen Maunder
- Produced by: Erken Ialgashev
- Starring: Mark Dacascos; Armand Assante; Tom Sizemore; Sofya Skya; Bruce Boxleitner; Danny Trejo; Steven Bauer; Igor Jijikine
- Music by: Misha Segal
- Distributed by: Gorilla Pictures
- Release date: February 9, 2010 (France)
- Running time: 87 minutes
- Country: United States
- Language: English

Shadows in Paradise is a 2010 American action film directed and written by J. Stephen Maunder, starring Mark Dacascos, Armand Assante, Tom Sizemore, and Sofya Skya.

== Plot ==
During a rescue operation in Iraq, Special Forces member Max Forrester (Mark Dacascos) is devastated when Sasha (Sofya Skya), his squad mate and fiancée, goes missing. Two years later, Max, now out of the military, receives a call from his ex-commander, Captain Dyer (Bruce Boxleitner), informing him that Sasha has been seen alive and moving freely about on a place called Paradise Island. He also informs Max the military is preparing to go in and extract her with possible charges of desertion or worse. Max sets off on his own to Paradise Island to find Sasha and learn the truth before Shadow Company gets to her first. Max eventually finds Sasha and learns she is working undercover as part of Al-Qaeda and is about to expose a weapons deal that will have a heavy impact on their organization. The story culminates in a battle wherein it is revealed that Shadow Company, led by their leader Ghost (Armand Assante), are in fact the weapons dealers who were using Sasha as an alibi to come to the island. Max and Sasha foil the weapons deal and recover the weapons in a spectacular showdown.

== Cast ==
- Mark Dacascos as Lieutenant Max Forrester
- Sofya Skya as Lieutenant Sasha Villanoff
- Armand Assante as Captain John "Ghost" Santos
- Tom Sizemore as Colonel Bunker
- Bruce Boxleitner as Captain Dyer
- Danny Trejo as "Matador"
- Steven Bauer as Agent Stubbs
- Igor Jijikine as "Spider"
- Andrew Divoff as Rykov
- Angie Hill as Agent Sung
- Levani Outchaneichvili as Ahmed
- Christine Scott Bennett as Christine
- Vernon Wells: General Ruth

== Production ==
Shadows in Paradise was written and directed by J. Stephen Maunder. The film was produced by Erken Ialgashev and Curtis Petersen for Aberto Entertainment. The musical score was composed by Misha Segal, with cinematography by Curtis Petersen and editing by Marc Cahill. The film has a running time of approximately 87 minutes and was produced in the United States in the English language.

== Release ==
Shadows in Paradise was released in 2010, with a direct-to-video release in the United States on 9 February 2010.
