= Sofya Skya =

Russian ballet dancer and actor

- Софья Ская
- Born: Sofya Andreyevna Arzhakovskaya; 12 August 1987 (age 38); Leningrad, RSFSR, USSR
- Occupations: Actress; acting coach; ballerina; director
- Years active: 2003–present
- Spouse: Sergey Veremeenko
- Website: sofyaskya.actor

Sofya Andreyevna Arzhakovskaya (Russian: Софья Андреевна Аржаковская; born 12 August 1987), known professionally as Sofya Skya (sometimes Sofya Skaya) (Russian: Софья Ская) is a Russian actress, ballet dancer, director and acting coach.

== Early life ==
Skya was born in Leningrad, Russian SFSR, Soviet Union (now Saint Petersburg, Russia). Her grandmother, Emma Shchetinina, was a famous harpist and teacher.

Skya began attending dance classes at a young age, and when she turned nine, she enrolled at the Vaganova Academy of Russian Ballet. At the age of twelve, she moved to Ufa for further training in ballet. She graduated from The Bashkir Choreographic College. As a principal dancer, Skya performed solo in such ballets as Swan Lake, La Bayadère, Snow White, La Esmeralda, and Raymonda at the Bashkortostan State Opera and Ballet Theatre.

Skya won numerous beauty contests. In 2005, she opened the third Vienna Opera Ball charity event in Moscow and won the "Russian Grace" contest. In 2006, she won the "Mrs World" pageant in Saint Petersburg.

She is the third wife of Sergey Veremeenko. They have one child.

== Career ==
In 2008, Sofya Skya attended a professional acting course at Baron Brown Studio in Los Angeles with Lisa Melillo . And have also worked with the famous Hollywood trainer Michelle Danner on boosting skills at Larry Moss Official Studio.

In 2008, Skya appeared as a desperate mother in The Courageous Heart of Irena Sendler, directed by John Kent Harrison. In 2009 she landed her first leading role in The Tomb, a film based on Edgar Allan Poe's Ligeia, starring Wes Bentley and Eric Roberts.

Following her appearances in those films, she was invited to play roles in Limelight (2009) and in Shadows in Paradise (2010) alongside Mark Dacascos. Also in 2010, she appeared in a Russian comedy, Klub Schast'ya, which brought her fame in Russia.

In 2013, Skya played the lead role in the film, Assassins Run (another name is White Swan), directed by Robert Crombie, alongside Christian Slater and Cole Hauser. In June 2013, Skya led the opening ceremony of the 35th Moscow International Film Festival.

She also appeared in the American thriller, My Stepdaughter (2015); the drama, Opus of an Angel (2017), directed by Ali Zamani; and the British thriller, Welcome to Curiosity (2018).

In 2019, she starred in the historical drama film, Once There Was a War, alongside Ben Cross. The movie is about the 14-day war between Serbia and Bulgaria in 1885, and is directed by Bulgarian director Anri Kulev. Skya played a Russian physician named Countess Anastasia Golovina. In 2020, the film was shown at the 42nd Moscow International Film Festival in Russia within the framework of the special program "Russian Trace".

== Other activities ==
In 2013, Skya performed a dance of tsaritsa Syuyumbike at the opening ceremony of the XXVII Summer Universiade in Kazan. She supports charity events, such as "Meet For Charity".

== Filmography ==
Film
Year	Title	Role	Director
2005	Hope for the Addicted		Robert Crombie, Sofya Skya
2009	Limelight	Tatyana	David Semel
2009	The Courageous Heart of Irena Sendler	Desperate Mother	John Kent Harrison
2009	The Tomb	Ligeia Romanova	Michael Straininger
2010	Shadows in Paradise	Lt. Sasha Villanoff	J. Stephen Maunder
2010	Klub schast'ya	Katya	Igor Kalenov
2013	White Swan (Assassins Run)	Maya Letiniskaya	Robert Crombie, Sofya Skya
2014	Coca Cola Commercial	Ballerina	Salvador Carrasco
2014	Operator real'nosti	Sof'ya	Vasiliy Pavlov
2015	My Stepdaughter	Skylar	Sofia Shinas
2017	Opus of an Angel	Erin	Ali Zamani
2018	Welcome to Curiosity	Alina	Ben Pickering
2019	Once There Was a War	Anastasiya Golovina	Anri Kulev
2020	Nartai	Yuliya	Gul'nara Sarsenova, Dito Tsintsadze
2020	Coven	Emily	Margaret Malandruccolo
2023	The Challenge	Tatiana 'Tanya', an anesthesiologist	Klim Shipenko

Television
Year	Title	Role	Notes	Director
2009	CSI: NY	Olympia	Episode: "Grounds for Deception"	Duane Clark
