= Biopure =

Biopure Corporation
- Type: Public (NASDAQ: BPUR)
- Industry: BioPharmaceuticals
- Founded: 1984
- Defunct: 2009
- Headquarters: Cambridge, Massachusetts, USA
- Key people: Zafiris G. Zafirelis (Chairman, President and CEO)
- Products: Blood Substitutes, Hemopure and Oxyglobin
- Revenue: US$2.56 million (2007)
- Number of employees: 0

Biopure Corporation was a biopharmaceutical company that specialized in oxygen therapeutics (blood substitutes) for both human and veterinary use. The company developed, manufactured, and marketed oxygen therapeutics, designed to transport oxygen to the body's tissues. The oxygen technology uses hemoglobin-based oxygen carrying molecules in solution (HBOCs) to increase oxygen transfer to the tissues. The competing companies with Biopure were Allied Pharmaceutical, Northfield Laboratories, Baxter International and Hemosol of Toronto. The company developed two products: Hemopure (HBOC-1) [hemoglobin glutamer-250 (bovine)] for human use, and Oxyglobin (HBOC-301) [hemoglobin glutamer-200 (bovine)] for veterinary use. In April 2001, Hemopure was approved for commercial sale in South Africa for treatment of acute anemia in general surgery. It is currently approved there and in Russia. However, Hemopure has not been able to gain approval in the U.K. or the U.S. because of safety and reliability concerns of the European Commission and the U.S. Food and Drug Administration (FDA) respectively. The company formed an agreement with the U.S. Navy to aid in preclinical testing of Hemopure for out-of-hospital treatment of trauma patients in hemorrhagic shock. Oxyglobin is the only oxygen therapeutic approved for treatment of canine anemia in both Europe and the U.S. and has been used in treatment for thousands of cases. Unable to obtain FDA approval for Hemopure to date, Biopure ceased operations in 2009 and its assets were purchased by OPK Biotech LLC in September 2009. On July 16, 2009 Biopure announced it had filed for bankruptcy protection under Chapter 11, Title 11, United States Code and entered into an agreement with OPK Biotech LLC for the sale of substantially all of its assets. It in turn went bankrupt and "Hemoglobin Oxygen Therapeutics LLC was organized in February 2014 in connection with the acquisition of OPK Biotech." Through it, Hemopure is still available under FDA’s Expanded access Program (EAP).

The company held nearly 30 patents relating to its oxygen therapeutics. Their patented and proprietary oxygen technology utilizes blood from cattle to develop the "hemoglobin-based" oxygen carrier rather than blood from humans. Most importantly, the issue of blood type matching is eliminated due to the "universal" nature of this oxygen therapeutic. The products are administered intravenously to deliver oxygen to the body's tissue through the formulated composition of purified hemoglobin from cattle blood and a balanced salt solution.

In Hemopure, the average oxygen content is maximized due to the reduced size of the stabilized HBOC molecules in comparison to red blood cells (RBCs). Oxyglobin primarily differs from Hemopure in molecule size of the stabilized HBOC. Oxyglobin is approved for oxygen fluid therapy and an alternative to RBC transfusion in dogs, and is administered intravenously as well. The stabilized HBOC then flows through the blood plasma in the body, where oxygen transport takes place. Due to the reduced size of the HBOC in Hemopure, oxygen can be transported to restricted areas where normal RBCs fail to reach. Another advantage of this patented oxygen technology is the increased shelf life of 36 months through storage conditions at room temperature, while RBCs must be refrigerated and discarded if not used after six weeks. However, these products are only indicated for temporary oxygen replenishment through the oxygen bridge, with an average half-life of 19 hours (specifically Hemopure), therefore long term oxygen support requires RBC blood transfusion.

== Side effects ==
According to clinical trials with Hemopure, the following adverse events occurred at greater than or equal to 5%: transient yellow skin discoloration, nausea, mild to moderate increase in blood pressure (10 to 20 mm/Hg), vomiting, low urine output, difficulty swallowing, flatulence, and low red blood cell count. The use of Oxyglobin has shown the following common side effects: discoloration of the skin, mucous membranes and urine. Adverse events such as vomiting and melena (dark color feces) can also occur. Dogs with impaired cardiac function and other conditions that are predisposed to circulatory overload can have adverse events after Oxyglobin administration. Repeat administration requires careful monitoring.

== History ==
=== Founding ===
Dr. Bing L. Wong and Mr. Carl W. Rausch co-founded Biopure Fine Chemicals in 1984, some months later renamed to Biopure Corporation. At Tufts New England Enzyme Center in Boston, Massachusetts, Bing and Carl were working on a new concept of making biologicals and in the process of creating a new company. Jim Judelson then challenged them to make a sizeable quantity of haemoglobin solution from cattle. The deal was that if they could make the solution within one week and the solution could be infused into a rabbit and caused no deaths, they would be given USD 500,000 to Biopure Fine Chemicals to start up the company. Based on their hands-on experience in dealing with bovine blood and using their connections with several slaughter houses within the region, Bing, Carl and Ted Jocobs collected the bovine blood early the next morning and worked carefully for the entire week. In the end, they sent 4 litres of purified bovine haemoglobin solution to the designated laboratory via FedEx. On the 3rd Friday morning in November 1984, Christina Poulos (Bing's secretary) handed a FedEx envelope to Bing containing a USD 500,000 cheque. This was the beginning of Biopure.

=== Product strategy ===
For Hemopure, Biopure took a long time to establish which medical indication upon which to focus the majority of its attention. This can be seen through its filings with the U.S. Securities and Exchange Commission (SEC), as the company changed Hemopure’s marketing and approval strategies over the seven years that the company was publicly traded.

In contrast, its Oxyglobin product enjoyed a fairly steady strategy, as Biopure consistently marketed the product mostly to small animal veterinarians. Unfortunately the small market size made turning a profit, especially ex-US, difficult.

== Challenges at Biopure ==
With such a promising technology, Biopure was faced with many issues that have led to the company’s current condition. By 1999, the US FDA and European Commission had approved Oxyglobin for the treatment for anemic dogs. By April 2001, South Africa’s Medicine Control Council approved Hemopure for treatment of surgical patients who are acutely anemic, to help generate revenue for the company. However, Biopure’s global commercialization strategy of marketing Hemopure in the US and European countries was still in its infant stages. During this time, Hemopure was still in Phase III and the company faced many challenges over this period of time. With the IPO of stock in 2001, Biopure was prepared to revolutionize the oxygen therapeutic industry with Hemopure. The company was ready to scale up manufacturing with the impending approval of Hemopure. In December 2002, the company was also looking to add a large scale manufacturing facility that would produce 500,000 Hemopure units a year (2003 Biopure 10-K). Majority of the employees of the company were in the manufacturing department and was one of the biggest costs to the company. By 2003, the company had to reduce the workforce to cut cost since Hemopure status was in a standstill in Phase III.

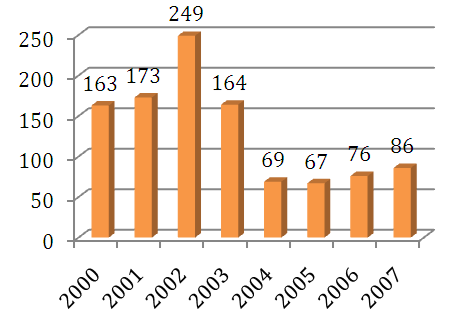
Number of Employees at Biopure YoY

Biopure was forced into a position to continue raising money to fund the clinical trials in a variety of indications in hopes of getting Hemopure onto the market. Many of the clinical trials results were being revealed and in April 2003, the FDA put on a hold of a proposed clinical trial on Hemopure for the use in trauma patients in the hospital setting. The company did not disclose that their clinical trial was on hold to the public and tried to go for an in-hospital trauma trial designation as a separate investigational new drug application (INDA) from the pending biologic license application (BLA) for orthopedic surgery indication. In July 2003, the FDA did not approve Hemopure for orthopedic surgery and had major concerns about the materials submitted to support the BLA and safety issues. In August 2003, Biopure announced to the street through public statements that the FDA was favorable and caused the stock to go up 20%. The company continued with its misleading statements and was able to raise $35 million by December 2003 from the sales of common stock. Information was leaked about the incomplete and misleading documents between late October and end of December 2003, which led to the stock dropping by 66% from the August 1, 2003 stock price.

The people indicted included Thomas Moore, the former CEO, for making and approving misleading statements; Howard Richman, the former head of regulatory, did the same as Moore; and Kober, the General Counsel, for drafting and approving misleading statements. The charge was violating Section 17(a) of the Securities Act of 1933 and Section 10(b) of the Securities Exchange Act of 1934 ("Exchange Act") and Rule 10b-5 thereunder and with directly or indirectly violating Section 13(a) of the Exchange Act and Rules 12b-20, 13a-1, 13a-11 and 13a-13 thereunder, and charges Moore with violating Rule 13a-14 thereunder. The Commission is seeking injunctive relief, civil penalties, and an order barring Moore, Richman and Kober from serving as officers or directors of any public company.

In April 2008, the Journal of the American Medical Association (JAMA) published a paper "Cell-Free Hemoglobin-Based Blood Substitutes and Risk of Myocardial Infarction and Death," which grouped clinical trials of Biopure, Baxter, Hemosol Biopharma, Northfield Laboratories, and Sangart and argued that these clinical trials should have been stopped. The FDA received data from individual studies that demonstrated increasing risk and should have led to terminations of trials. The paper revealed that several artificial blood products increased the risk of death by 30% and almost tripled the risk of heart attacks in 16 clinical trials. The current rule is that the agency has the right to keep the information of new products confidential for competitive reasons. The JAMA paper wants Congress to review this policy for the safety of the public. Biopure refutes these findings and has been active in defending their position. On Biopure’s website, they have a section dedicated to commenting on the JAMA article.

On July 14, 2008 The Wall Street Journal reported that the National Institutes of Health (NIH) investigator who was the lead author of the JAMA paper did not disclose the conflict of interest. Charles Natanson stated in the paper that he did receive a one-time fee of $10,000 from a blood substitute company, but did not reveal that he was a co-inventor on a patent for a competing technology from the NIH that could make the product safer. The patent is for the use of reducing the toxicity of blood substitute and the NIH has been looking to license the technology. Peers of Natanson still believe that his study was valid and went through a rigorous process. In September 2008, Howard Richman, the former head of regulatory affairs and under SEC investigation, was charged for obstruction of justice. The story behind this was that Richman allegedly forged a doctor’s letter about having been diagnosed with terminal colon cancer and had his lawyer defend him with this health condition. The judge stopped litigation by the end of 2007. A new indictment was charged for lying and if convicted faces 10 years in jail.

On March 11, 2009 Howard Richman pleaded guilty in U.S. District Court and admitted he had instructed his lawyers to tell a judge he was gravely ill with colon cancer. He also admitted to posing as his doctor in a phone call with his lawyer so that she would tell the judge that his cancer had spread and that he was undergoing chemotherapy. Richman faces up to 10 years in prison at sentencing, scheduled for June 10. There is no plea agreement.

By the end of November, 2008 Biopure Corp. had terminated all but four of its employees and "shut down its manufacturing facility in Cambridge and its processing facility in Pennsylvania". In the first quarter of 2009, it sold "substantially all of its inventory of Oxyglobin to distributors". Biopure "expects to cease operations and sell the Company or its assets" by July 31, 2009.

Biopure was the subject of a Harvard Business School marketing strategy case study.
