= Elegest coal mine =

Elegest Coal Mine
- Location: Tuva, Russia
- Products: Coking coal

The Elegest Coal Mine is a coal mine located in Tuva. The mine has coal reserves amounting to 855.2 million tonnes of coking coal, one of the largest coal reserves in Asia and the world. The mine has an annual production capacity of 7 million tonnes of coal.
