= Deposit Insurance Agency of Russia =

Russian state corporation

The Deposit Insurance Agency (DIA; Russian: Агентство по страхованию вкладов, АСВ) is a Russian state corporation (non-profit organization) established in January 2004 to manage operation of the deposit insurance system in the Russian Federation. DIA pays insurance compensations to depositors of failed banks. DIA also exercises bankruptcy administrator functions of insolvent banks, non–governmental pension funds and insurance companies, it is responsible for resolution of banks and managing the system of guaranteeing the rights of insured persons in the mandatory pension insurance system.

== Deposit insurance ==
The deposit insurance system in the Russian Federation operates in accordance with the Federal Law No.177–FZ of December 23, 2003 “On Insurance of Deposits in Banks of the Russian Federation”. The deposit insurance system (DIS) provides protection to depositors that have accounts in Russian banks up to the coverage limit established by law. Participation in the deposit insurance system is mandatory for all banks that raise funds from individuals.

Since the start of the DIS operation, the coverage level has grown 14 times:

- before August 9, 2006 – 100 thousand rubles;
- before March 25, 2007 – 190 thousand rubles;
- before October 1, 2008 – 400 thousand rubles;
- before December 28, 2014 – 700 thousand rubles;
- after December 29, 2014 – 1.4 million rubles.

The following types of accounts/deposits are subject to insurance with the coverage limit of up to 1.4 million rubles:

- accounts and deposits of individuals (regardless of citizenship), including those opened to individual entrepreneurs;
- accounts and deposits of legal entities – small businesses included in the unified register of SMEs (except for financial institutions);
- accounts and deposits of non–profit organizations and social associations of citizens:
  - accounts of consumer cooperatives (with the exception of non–credit financial institutions);
  - accounts of associations of real estate owners (including gardeners' non–commercial partnerships, HOAs, etc.);
  - accounts of religious organizations;
  - accounts of charitable foundations;
  - accounts of organizations included in the register of performers of socially beneficial activities, and others.

Cash on debit bank cards (including payroll cards) is also insured. The interest on insured deposits accrued up to the day preceding the day of bank failure (insured event) is also insured. Compensation for deposits in foreign currency is paid in rubles at the rate of the Bank of Russia at the day of the insured event.

The following accounts/deposits are subject to insurance in the amount of up to 10 million rubles:

- Money deposited into escrow accounts of an individual open for settlements on real estate purchase and sale transactions or agreements for participation in shared construction;
- Money placed by the property management company on a special account for the formation and use of funds for capital repairs of common property in an apartment building (for insured events that have occurred starting from October 1, 2020);
- Temporarily high balances on an individual's account resulting from the receipt (up to 3 months before the insured event) of funds from third parties due to exceptional life circumstances determined by the Law: sale of real estate, inheritance, social benefits, subsidies, etc. (for insured events starting from October 1, 2020).

Insurance claims in the increased amount in the event of special circumstances are calculated on the basis of 100 percent of the balance (as of the date of the insured event) of funds received on the depositor's account (accounts) in connection with (one or more) special circumstances and within the time limits established by the Law, but no more than 10 million rubles in aggregate, including a payment of 1.4 million rubles on general grounds.

=== Insurance payouts mechanism ===
Upon occurrence of an insured event, depositors are reimbursed from the Mandatory Deposit Insurance Fund. If an insured event occurs in relation to the bank (the Bank of Russia revokes its banking license or introduces a moratorium on meeting creditors' claims), the depositor has the right to apply to the DIA with a claim to pay compensation for deposits. To receive compensation for deposits, a citizen must submit to the DIA (or an authorized agent bank) an application and an identity document (usually a passport), as well as additional documents in cases provided for by the Deposit Insurance Law. This can be done at any time from the date of the insured event until the completion of the bank's liquidation (bankruptcy proceedings) -- which, as a rule, lasts at least from two to three years. In exceptional cases, if there are valid reasons, the insurance indemnity is also paid to persons who did not apply within these terms.

Payment of compensation is made directly by the DIA or through an authorized agent bank in accordance with the register of the bank's liabilities to depositors. Payouts begin no later than 14 days from the date of the insured event. The DIA is reducing the timing of the start of payouts – for example, in 2020, payouts began on average on the seventh working day.

Depositors can find out about the start date of deposit insurance payouts as well as about place, time, form and procedure for accepting applications for payment of reimbursement from the message for depositors posted on the official website of the DIA, in the section "Banks / Insurance payouts" (on the bank's page). If the amount of the deposit(s) exceeds the coverage limit established by the legislation, the liabilities of the bank to the depositor are satisfied in the course of bankruptcy (liquidation) proceedings in relation to the bank.

As of July 1, 2022, DIA has faced 548 insured events, a total of 4.4 million depositors were reimbursed for the total amount of 2.05 trillion rubles.

=== Mandatory deposit insurance fund ===
Funds to ensure the operation of the system are accumulated in the Mandatory Deposit Insurance Fund (MDIF). The deposit insurance model is built in such a way that regardless of the number of insured events, the amount of payouts, as well as the volume of accumulated financial resources, there will always be enough money in the Fund due to the possibility of borrowing funds (loans) from the Bank of Russia and a number of other mechanisms envisaged by law. Insurance premiums are paid by DIS member banks on a quarterly basis. The rate of insurance premiums is established by the Board of Directors of the DIA.

Since the third quarter of 2020, the base rate of insurance premiums in the MDIF is 0.12% of the calculated base, additional and increased additional rates of insurance premiums are 25% and 300% of the base rate, respectively. For the DIA, as for all other government corporations, the Government of the Russian Federation establishes the general procedure and conditions for investments, as well as procedures and mechanisms for control over the investment of temporarily surplus funds.

The list of permitted assets for investing the Fund's resources includes:

- government securities of the Russian Federation and constituent entities of the Russian Federation;
- deposits with the Bank of Russia;
- bonds of Russian issuers;
- mortgage–backed securities of Russian issuers;
- securities of international financial organizations admitted for placement or public circulation in the Russian Federation.

Over 2020, 232.7 billion rubles were transferred to the MDIF accounts from the following sources:

- insurance premiums from member banks in the amount of 160.6 billion rubles;
- recoveries from liquidated banks’ assets to repay claims for previously paid compensation in the amount of 59.1 billion rubles;
- return of investment of temporarily surplus funds of the MDIF in the amount of 13 billion rubles.

== DIA as liquidator and bankruptcy administrator ==
Since 2004, the DIA has been acting as a liquidator and bankruptcy administrator of failed credit institutions. The compulsory liquidation is carried out at the request of the Bank of Russia on the basis of a decision of the arbitration court if the value of the property (assets) of a credit institution whose banking license has been revoked by the Bank of Russia is sufficient to fulfill its liabilities to creditors and obligations to pay mandatory payments. If the property (assets) of the liquidated credit institution is insufficient to satisfy the claims of its creditors, then a bankruptcy procedure is introduced on the basis of the decision of the arbitration court. The DIA is a bankruptcy administrator of credit institutions that had a license from the Bank of Russia to attract funds from individuals as deposits. The DIA performs the functions of the bankruptcy administrator in relation to credit institutions that did not have a license from the Bank of Russia to attract deposits from individuals if the Bank of Russia submits the DIA's candidacy for approval to the arbitration court when the bankruptcy commissioner as an individual person is not submitted to the arbitration court; or removal of the bankruptcy commissioner who is an individual from the performance of his duties as bankruptcy administrator; or an absent credit institution has been declared bankrupt.

As of December 31, 2021, the DIA performed the functions of a bankruptcy administrator in 350 credit institutions: bankruptcy proceedings were carried out in respect of 326 credit institutions, and compulsory liquidation in respect of 24. As of December 31, 2021, the claims of 481.1 thousand creditors of credit institutions in liquidation were established; the amount of established claims of creditors in liquidated banks was about 3.3 trillion rubles.

Since the beginning of the DIA's activities as a bankruptcy administrator (liquidator) as of December 31, 2021, liquidation proceedings have been completed in 387 credit institutions. For the entire period of the DIA's activity the average percentage of claims satisfaction (as of December 31, 2021) on credit institutions with completed liquidation proceedings accounted for 48.1%. In terms of priority, for the entire period of the DIA's activity, the claims of the first priority creditors were satisfied on average by 68.4%, second priority claims – by 37.0%, and the third priority claims – by 32.9%.

From January 1, 2014, amendments to the legislation that entrusted the DIA with the functions of managing liquidation proceedings in relation to non–government pension funds that are participants in the system of guaranteeing the rights of insured persons in the compulsory pension insurance system of the Russian Federation, as well as in relation to non–government pension funds carrying out activities on compulsory pension insurance and not included by the DIA in the register of participating institutions.

As of December 31, 2021, the DIA conducted liquidation proceedings in 30 non–governmental pension funds that previously carried out activities on compulsory pension insurance and were not registered in the system of guaranteeing the rights of insured persons. 27 of them were subject to bankruptcy proceedings and 3 to compulsory liquidation. During the period when the DIA exercised the powers of the bankruptcy administrator of non–government pension funds, liquidation proceedings were completed in 6 institutions.

Since December 2016, the DIA has been granted authority as a bankruptcy administrator for insurance organizations. As of December 31, 2021, the DIA exercised the powers of a liquidator in 33 insurance organizations.

== Bank resolution ==
In addition, the DIA is entrusted with the functions of bank resolution. The DIA can carry out this activity by:

- providing financial assistance;
- organizing sale auctions for property, which is a security for the fulfillment of the bank's obligations, including to the Bank of Russia;
- performance of the functions of the provisional administration of a bank;
- other actions.

For the DIA’s participation in activities on bank resolution, the law provides for the attraction of interested private investors who must meet the requirements established by the Bank of Russia. In total (on an accrual basis), as of December 31, 2021, the DIA actually allocated funds in the amount of 2.1 trillion rubles for the purpose of preventing bank bankruptcies, of which 1.6 trillion rubles at the expense of loans from the Bank of Russia, 314 billion rubles at the expense of the property contribution of the Russian Federation to the DIA's assets, 247 billion rubles at the expense of property contribution of the Bank of Russia to the DIA's assets and 7.75 billion rubles at the expense of the MDIF.

As of December 31, 2021, the DIA participated in the prevention of bankruptcy (resolution) of 13 banks.

In 2017, the functions of the DIA in terms of resolution were slightly changed due to the introduction of a new mechanism for financial rehabilitation of systemically important credit institutions through the Banking Sector Consolidation Fund (BSCF) without the DIA's participation.

== Pension guarantee system ==
In order to ensure the functioning of the system of guaranteeing the rights of insured persons, the DIA:

- raises funds for guaranteeing pension savings, including the collection of guarantee contributions and control over the completeness and timeliness of receipt of guarantee contributions to the guarantee fund for pension savings;
- carries out the payment of warranty compensation in the cases and in the manner provided for by the Federal Law No. 422–FZ;
- invests the funds of the pension savings guarantee fund in the manner prescribed by the legislation of the Russian Federation;
- exercises in the cases established by the legislation of the Russian Federation the powers of the liquidator and the bankruptcy administrator of the participating pension funds.

The DIA also maintains a register of non–government pension funds which participate in the system of guaranteeing the rights of insured persons. The procedure for entering and excluding member funds from the register is carried out by the DIA on the basis of decisions of the Central Bank of the Russian Federation. The Pension Fund of the Russian Federation is a member of the pension savings guarantee system.

Pension savings are guaranteed by the DIA through the payment of a guarantee compensation, which is made upon the occurrence of one of the following events (guarantee claims):

- revocation of the license of a participating fund to carry out activities related to pension provision and pension insurance and (or) declaring its bankruptcy and opening bankruptcy proceedings against such a participating fund;
- lack of nominal contributions on the day of superannuation and (or) an urgent pension payment or a lump sum payment at the expense of pension savings funds to the insured persons;
- a decrease in the amount of reserves of the Pension Fund of the Russian Federation for compulsory pension insurance, which ensures the sustainability of the fulfillment of obligations to insured persons, below the minimum level established by the Government of the Russian Federation.

The DIA guarantees reimbursement of pension savings reflected in the funded pension account (individual personal account) of an insured person, with the exception of investment income. At the same time, the size of the assigned pensions (funded pension and (or) urgent pension payment or a lump sum) is fully guaranteed and cannot be reduced.

== Governance and structure ==
The governing bodies of the DIA are the Board of Directors, the Management Board and General Director. The supreme governing body is the Board of Directors, which includes representatives of the Bank of Russia, five representatives of the Government of the Russian Federation and General Director of the Agency.

Elvira Nabiullina — Chairman of the Board of Directors, Governor of the Bank of Russia

== See also ==
- Federal Deposit Insurance Corporation
- Banking in Russia
