= Sergey Veremeenko =

Russian billionaire (born 1955)

- Сергей Веремеенко
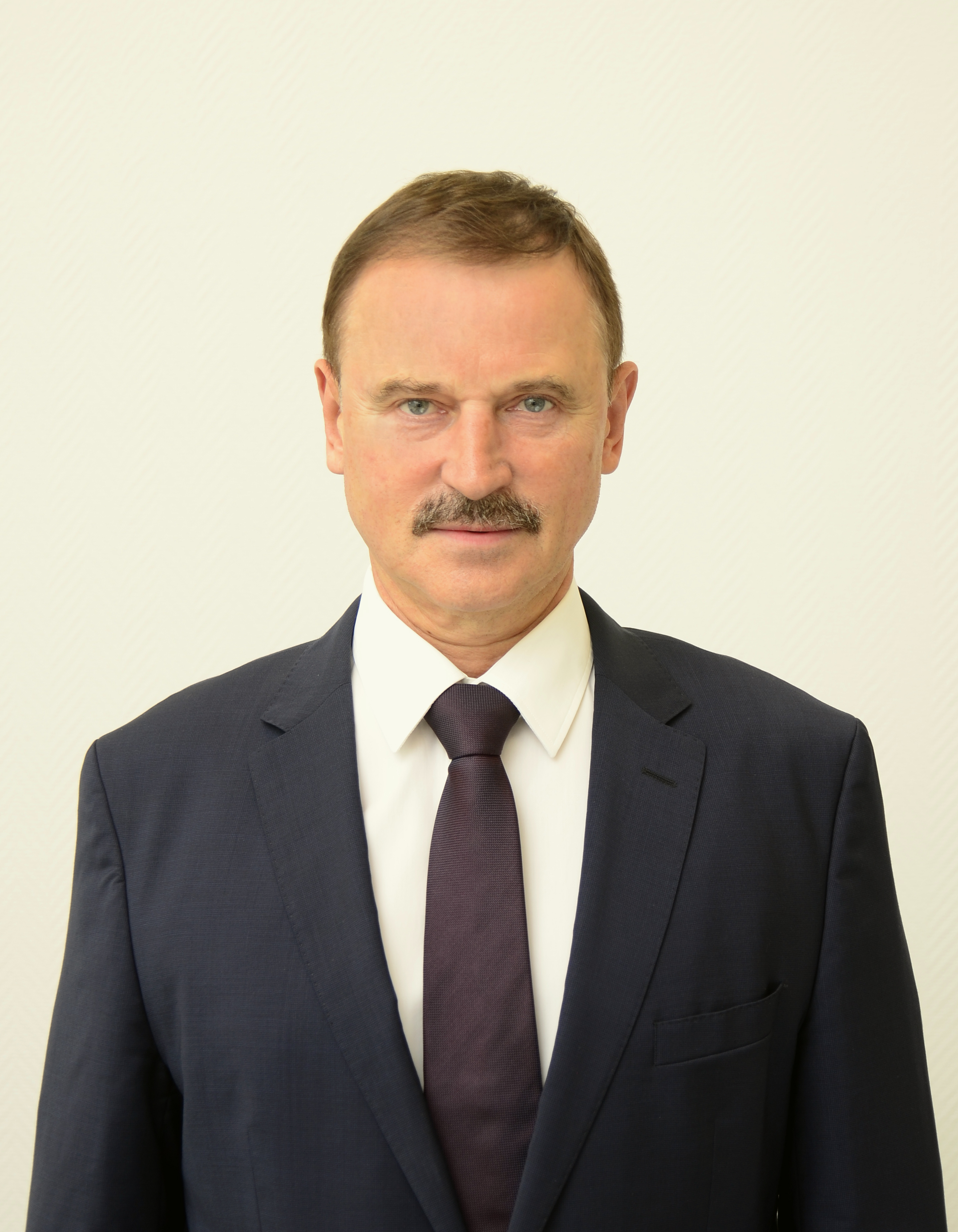
- Veremeenko in 2018

Member of the State Duma
- Incumbent
- Assumed office 5 October 2016
- President: Vladimir Putin
- Prime Minister: Dmitry Medvedev; Mikhail Mishustin

Personal details
- Born: Pereslavl-Zalessky, Yaroslavl Oblast, Russian SFSR
- Party: United Russia
- Spouse: Sofya Skya
- Children: 1
- Education: Ufa State Petroleum Technological University
- Known for: Being a Russian oligarch
- Awards: Lenin Komsomol Prize

Sergey Alekseyevich Veremeenko (born 26 September 1955, Ufa) is a Russian businessman and politician. According to Forbes magazine, his net worth is estimated at 1.4 billion US dollars.

== Biography ==
Veremeenko was born in Ufa.

In 2003 he ran for the presidency of the Republic of Bashkortostan. He competed against the incumbent head of the region, Murtaza Rakhimov, but eventually withdrew from the race. The same year he ended his partnership with Sergey Pugachev, with whom he co-owned the International Industrial Bank.

== Business ==
Veremeenko has investments in steel, mining, banking, and microelectronics. He owns 25% of Estar, a steel and metals group. He also invests in luxury housing developments in the Moscow suburbs and in agricultural land in the Tver, Kaluga, and Penza regions.

He holds publishing interests in the newspapers Pravda.ru and Pravda International.

== Personal life ==
Since 2006, Veremeenko has been married to actress and model Sofya Skya (née Arzhakovskaya), who won the title of Mrs. World 2006. He was previously married twice.

== Sanctions ==
He is one of the members of the State Duma the United States Treasury sanctioned on 24 March 2022 in response to the 2022 Russian invasion of Ukraine.

He was sanctioned by the UK government in 2022 in relation to the Russo-Ukrainian War.
