= Andreapolsky District =

Andreapolsky District Андреапольский район (Russian)
- District
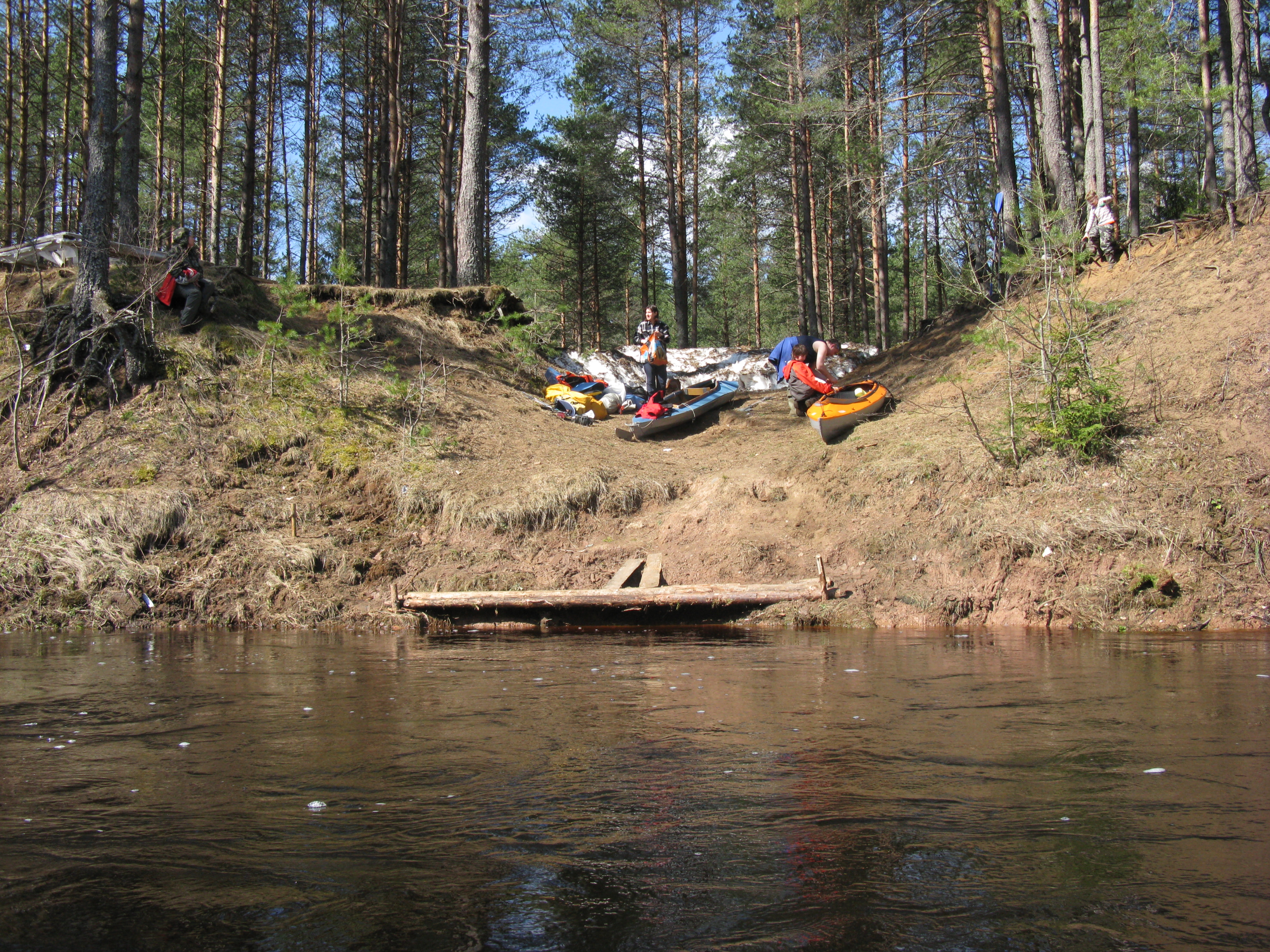
- River camp, Andreapolsky District

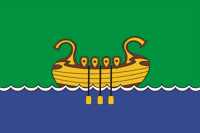
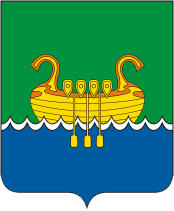
- Flag Coat of arms
- Location of Andreapolsky District in Tver Oblast
- Coordinates: 56°39′N 32°16′E
- Country: Russia
- Federal subject: Tver Oblast
- Established: 1965
- Administrative center: Andreapol

Area
  - Total: 3,051 km^{2} (1,178 sq mi)

Population (2010 Census)
  - Total: 13,756
  - Density: 4.509/km^{2} (11.68/sq mi)
  - Urban: 60.2%
  - Rural: 39.8%

Administrative structure
  - Administrative divisions: 1 Urban settlements, 7 Rural settlements
  - Inhabited localities: 1 cities/towns, 251 rural localities

Municipal structure
  - Municipally incorporated as: Andreapolsky Municipal District
  - Municipal divisions: 1 urban settlements, 7 rural settlements
- Time zone: UTC+3 (MSK)
- OKTMO ID: 28602000
- Website: http://tsma.tver.ru/

Andreapolsky District (Russian: Андреа́польский райо́н) is an administrative and municipal district (raion), one of the thirty-six in Tver Oblast, Russia. It is located in the Valdai Hills in the west of the oblast and borders with Maryovsky District of Novgorod Oblast in the north, Penovsky District in the northeast, Selizharovsky District in the east, Nelidovsky District in the south, Zapadnodvinsky District in the southwest, Toropetsky District in the west, and with Kholmsky District of Novgorod Oblast in the northwest. The area of the district is 3,051 square kilometers (1,178 sq mi). Its administrative center is the town of Andreapol. Population: 13,756 (2010 Census); 16,213 (2002 census); 17,900 (1989 Soviet census). The population of Andreapol accounts for 60.2% of the district's total population.

== Geography ==
The area of Andreapolsky District is shared between the drainage basins of the Neva, the Western Dvina, and the Volga, and thus the divide between the basins of the Atlantic Ocean and the Caspian Sea runs through the district. The northwestern part of the district belongs to the drainage basin of the Lovat River, a major tributary of Lake Ilmen. The rivers in the central part of the district drain into the Daugava, or the Western Dvina as it is known in Russia. The source of the Western Dvina is located in the district. This area contains a large lake district in the southwestern outskirts of the Valdai Hills. The biggest lakes are Lake Luchanskoye and Lake Brosno. The southeastern part of the district belongs to the drainage basin of the Zhukopa River, a tributary of the Volga.

The southern part of the district belongs to the Central Forest Nature Reserve, a protected area created to preserve conifer forest with the corresponding plants and animals, including the Eurasian brown bear, in the upper course of the Western Dvina.

== History ==
The area of the district in the Middle Ages was interchangeably under control of the Novgorod Republic, Principality of Smolensk, and the Lithuania. In 1335, the war between Lithuania and the Grand Duchy of Moscow started, and in the beginning of the 15th century the area was transferred to the Grand Duchy of Moscow. The Dubna Volost, currently a part of the town of Andreapol, was mentioned in the chronicles in 1489. After several wars between Moscow and Lithuania, during which the area was transferred to Lithuania and back, it was in 1508 again included to the Grand Duchy of Moscow.

In the course of the administrative reform carried out in 1708 by Peter the Great, most of the area was included into Ingermanlandia Governorate (since 1710 known as Saint Petersburg Governorate), and in 1727 Novgorod Governorate split off. In 1772, Ostashkov was granted town status, and Ostashkovsky Uyezd of Novgorod Governorate was established, with the seat in Ostashkov. The area on the left bank of the Western Dvina was included into Ostashkovsky Uyezd. In 1775, Tver Viceroyalty was formed from the lands which previously belonged to Moscow and Novgorod Governorates, and this area was transferred to Tver Viceroyalty, which in 1796 was transformed to Tver Governorate. Also in 1772, as a result of the First Partition of Poland, Pskov Governorate was created, and the areas on the right bank of the Western Dvina were included into Toropetsky and Kholmsky Uyezds of Pskov Governorate. In 1777, Pskov Governorate was transformed into Pskov Viceroyalty, and in 1796, the viceroyalty was abolished, and Pskov Governorate was restored.

The lands in the south of the district, on the left bank of the Western Dvina, in 1708 was included into Belsky Uyezd of Smolensk Governorate and remained there until 1929, with the exception of the brief periods between 1713 and 1726, when it belonged to Riga Governorate, and between 1775 and 1796, when Smolensk Governorate was transformed into Smolensk Viceroyalty.

Between 1810 and 1843, a spa resort was operating in Andreapol, at the time Adreyano Pole. Between 1904 and 1907, the construction of the railroad to Bologoye was completed. In 1906, the station of Andreapol was opened, and the selo of Andreapol, which included villages of Dubna, Andreyano Pole, and Gorka, was established.

On August 1, 1927, Pskov Governorate was abolished, and Leningrad Oblast was established. Toropetsky Uyezd was abolished as well, and Leninsky District, with the administrative center in the selo of Khotilitsy was established. It belonged to Velikiye Luki Okrug of Leningrad Oblast. In 1928, the district center was moved to Andreapol. On June 17, 1929, the district was transferred to Western Oblast. On August 1, 1930, the okrugs were abolished, and the districts were subordinated directly to the oblast. On January 29, 1935 Kalinin Oblast was established, and Leninsky District was transferred to Kalinin Oblast. In 1938, Andreapol was granted urban-type settlement status. Between September 1941 and January 1942, during World War II, the district was occupied by German troops. On August 22, 1944, the district was transferred to newly established Velikiye Luki Oblast. On October 2, 1957, Velikiye Luki Oblast was abolished, and Leninsky District was transferred back to Kalinin Oblast. In February 1963, during the abortive administrative reform by Nikita Khrushchev, Leninsky District was merged into Toropetsky District. On January 12, 1965, Andreapolsky District was established in the areas which previously belonged to Toropetsky and Ostashkovsky Districts. In 1967, Andreapol was granted town status. In 1990, Kalinin Oblast was renamed Tver Oblast.

On August 1, 1927 Bologovsky District with the administrative center located in the selo of Bologovo was established as well. The district was a part of Velikiye Luki Okrug of Leningrad Oblast, and on June 17, 1929 with the rest of the okrug it was transferred to Western Oblast. On September 20, 1930 the district was abolished and split between Kholmsky and Leninsky Districts.

On June 1, 1936 Seryozhinsky District with the administrative center located in the selo of Bologovo was established. The district was a part of Kalinin Oblast. On August 23, 1944, it was transferred to Velikiye Luki Oblast, and on October 2, 1957, it was transferred back to Kalinin Oblast. On January 12, 1960, Seryozhinsky District was abolished and split between Leninsky and Toropetsky Districts.

== Economy ==
=== Industry ===
Forests cover around 70% of the district. As a result, the logging industry is a substantial source of revenue. Another developed industry is agriculture. There is also a porcelain production plant in Andreapol, as well as a number of food industry enterprises.

=== Agriculture ===
The main agricultural specialization of the district is cattle breeding with meat and milk production. Milk can not be processed in the district and is transported for processing in surrounding districts. Crops growing, mainly for fodder.

=== Transportation ===
The railway connecting Bologoye with Velikiye Luki crosses the district from northeast to southwest. Andreapol is the main railway station within the district. There is infrequent passenger traffic.

A paved road connecting Ostashkov with Zapadnaya Dvina via Peno and Andreapol crosses the district from east to west. There are local roads as well. There is bus traffic in the district.

== Ecology ==
The extensive commercial logging has had a negative impact on the environment.

== Culture and recreation ==
The district contains two cultural heritage monuments of federal significance and additionally 108 objects classified as cultural and historical heritage of local significance (three of them located in Andreapol). The federal monuments are the Trinity Church in the settlement of Lugi (1764), as well as an archeological monument.

There is a local museum in Andreapol.
