= Penovsky District =

Penovsky Municipal Okrug Пеновский муниципальный округ (Russian)
- District
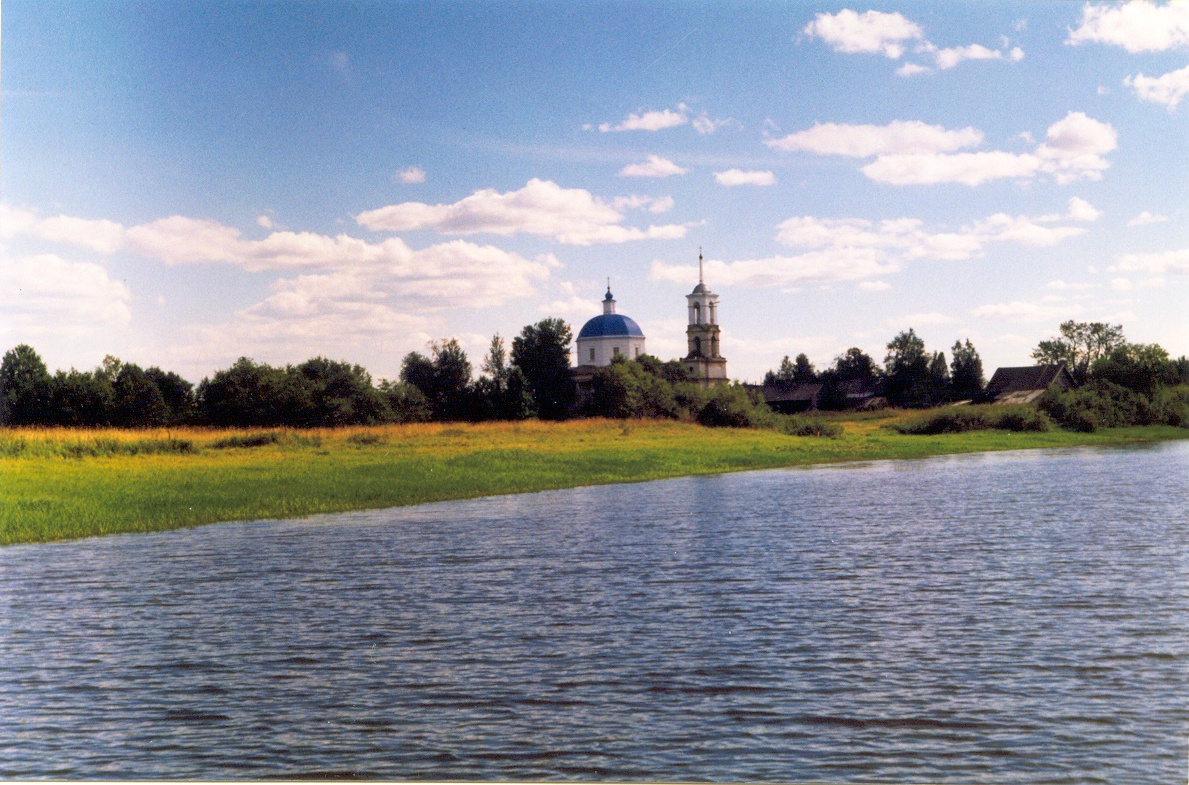
- The village of Vseluki

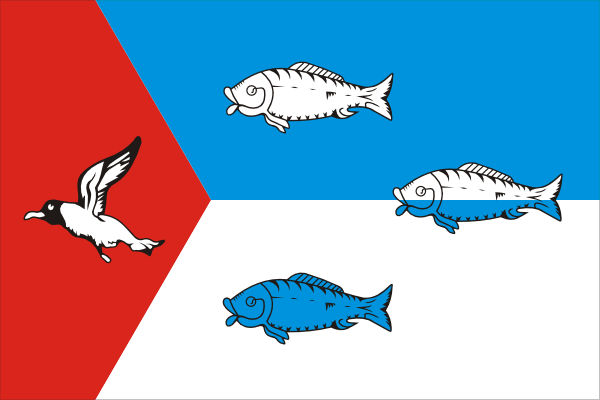
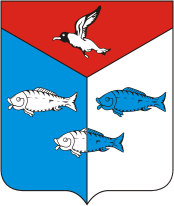
- Flag Coat of arms
- Location of Penovsky District in Tver Oblast
- Coordinates: 56°56′30″N 32°44′07″E
- Country: Russia
- Federal subject: Tver Oblast
- Established: 1 October 1929
- Administrative center: Peno

Area
  - Total: 2,385 km^{2} (921 sq mi)

Population (2010 Census)
  - Total: 6,864
  - Density: 2.878/km^{2} (7.454/sq mi)
  - Urban: 61.5%
  - Rural: 38.5%

Administrative structure
  - Administrative divisions: 1 Urban settlements, 6 Rural settlements
  - Inhabited localities: 1 urban-type settlements, 135 rural localities

Municipal structure
  - Municipally incorporated as: Penovsky Municipal District
  - Municipal divisions: 1 urban settlements, 6 rural settlements
- Time zone: UTC+3 (MSK)
- OKTMO ID: 28646000
- Website: http://penoadm.ru/

Penovsky District (Russian: Пеновский район) is an administrative and municipal district (raion), one of the thirty-six in Tver Oblast, Russia. It is located in the northwest of the oblast and borders with Ostashkovsky District in the north, Selizharovsky District in the east, Andreapolsky District in the south, and with Maryovsky District of Novgorod Oblast in the west. The area of the district is 2,385 square kilometers (921 sq mi). Its administrative center is the urban locality (an urban-type settlement) of Peno. Population: 6,864 (2010 Census); 8,523 (2002 census); 10,291 (1989 Soviet census). The population of Peno accounts for 61.5% of the district's total population.

== Geography ==
The area of Penovsky District is shared between the drainage basins of the Neva, the Western Dvina, and the Volga, and thus the divide between the basins of the Atlantic Ocean and the Caspian Sea runs through the district. The rivers in the minor areas in the north of the district, including the Maryovka River, drain into the Lovat River, a tributary of Lake Ilmen, in the basin of the Neva. The southwestern part of the district belongs to the basin of the Western Dvina, which has its source inside the district, and flows through Lake Okhvat, one of the biggest lakes of the district, before turning south and leaving the district. The rest of the area belongs to the drainage basin of the Volga. The Volga itself flows through Lake Vselug, Lake Peno, and Lake Volgo, parts of the Upper Volga Reservoir, which are all located in the district. The biggest tributaries of the Volga within the district are the Kud River with Lake Vitbino, and the Zhukopa River (both right).

== History ==
The area of the district was populated from prehistory and served as a junction between waterways along the Lovat, the Volga, and the Zapadnaya Dvina. Numerous archeological monuments were found in the area of the district dating from the 5th millennium BC. Since the second half of the 12th century, the area was under control of the Novgorod Republic. The area was attractive because it gave an easy access to control of the most important waterways, and was a subject of frequent wars. In the 13th century, it was controlled by the Lithuania. In 1335, the war between Lithuania and the Grand Duchy of Moscow started, and in the beginning of the 15th century the area was transferred to the Grand Duchy of Moscow and was subordinate to Rzhev Principality, which was subordinate to Moscow. In 1449, a peace treaty determined the border between Poland (the successor of Lithuania) and Rzhev. The border ran through the current area of Penovsky District. The treaty in this part was never properly enforced, and the area remained under control of Moscow.

In the course of the administrative reform carried out in 1708 by Peter the Great, the area was included into Ingermanlandia Governorate (since 1710 known as Saint Petersburg Governorate), and in 1727 Novgorod Governorate split off. In 1772, Ostashkov was granted town status, and Ostashkovsky Uyezd of Novgorod Governorate was established, with the seat in Ostashkov. The area was included into Ostashkovsky Uyezd. In 1775, Tver Viceroyalty was formed from the lands which previously belonged to Moscow and Novgorod Governorates, and the area was transferred to Tver Viceroyalty, which in 1796 was transformed to Tver Governorate. Between 1904 and 1907, the construction of the railroad to Bologoye was completed. The railroad to Torzhok was built between 1916 and 1928. From 1924, the settlement of Peno was made a center of a volost. In 1926, Peno was granted urban-type settlement status.

On 1 October 1929, governorates and uyezds were abolished, and Penovsky District with the administrative center in the settlement of Peno was established. It belonged to Velikiye Luki Okrug of Western Oblast. On August 1, 1930 the okrugs were abolished, and the districts were subordinated directly to the oblast. On January 29, 1935 Kalinin Oblast was established, and Penovsky District was transferred to Kalinin Oblast. During World War II, a part of the district including Peno was occupied by German troops. On 22 August 1944, the district was transferred to newly established Velikiye Luki Oblast. On 2 October 1957, Velikiye Luki Oblast was abolished, and Penovsky District was transferred back to Kalinin Oblast. In February 1963, during the abortive administrative reform by Nikita Khrushchev, Kirovsky and Penovsky Districts were merged into Ostashkovsky District. On December 27, 1973 Penovsky District was re-established. In 1990, Kalinin Oblast was renamed Tver Oblast. In May 2020 by the Laws 23.04.2020 № 23-ZO and 23.04.2020 № 20-ЗО of the Tver Oblast, the Penovsky municipal raion, the urban and rural settlements included in it were transformed into the Penovsky municipal okrug.

== Economy ==
=== Industry ===
There are enterprises of timber, construction, and food industries in the district. Formerly, timber industry provided the major part of the GDP of the district, however, currently it experiences a deep crisis.

=== Agriculture ===
The main agricultural specialization of the district is cattle breeding with meat production.

=== Transportation ===
The railway connecting Bologoye with Velikiye Luki crosses the district from northeast to southwest. Peno, Soblago, and Okhvat are the main railway stations within the district. In Soblago, a railway branches east and connects with Likhoslavl via Selizharovo, Kuvshinovo, and Torzhok. There is infrequent passenger traffic.

A paved road connecting Ostashkov with Zapadnaya Dvina via Peno and Andreapol crosses the district from east to west. There are local roads as well. There is bus traffic in the district.

== Culture and recreation ==
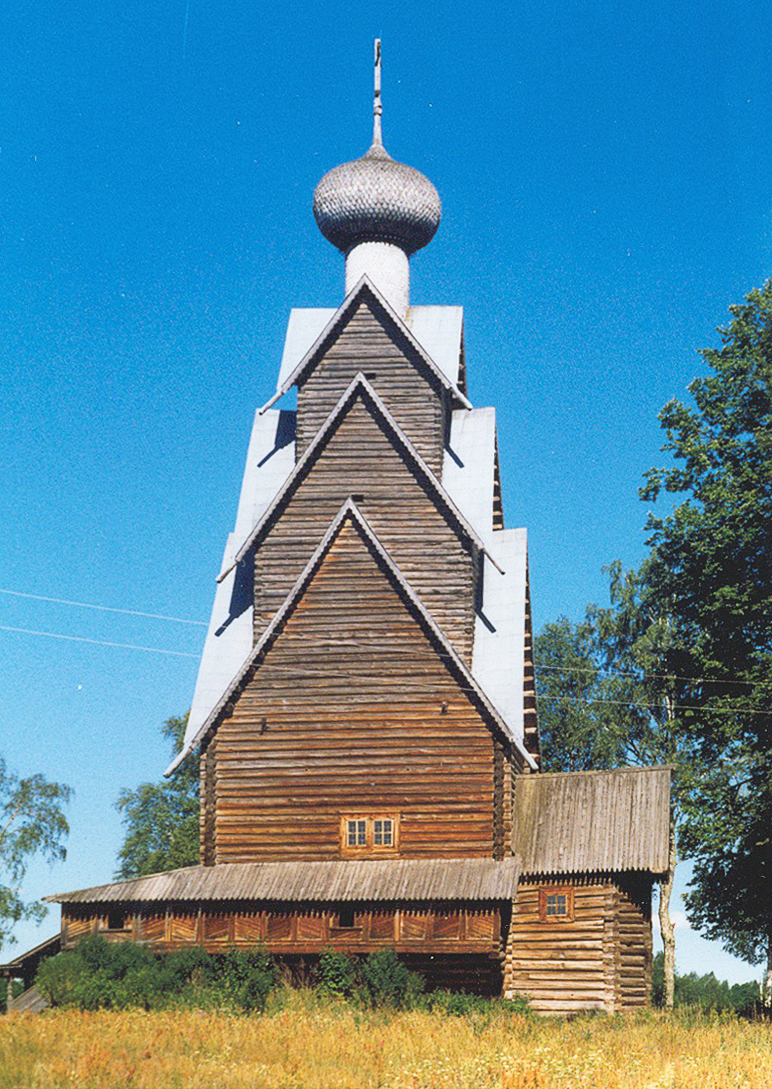
The Church of the Nativity of Saint John the Baptist at Shirkov Pogost.

The district contains eight cultural heritage monuments of federal significance (two of them located in Peno) and additionally thirty-five objects classified as cultural and historical heritage of local significance. The federal monuments include the wooden Church of the Nativity of Saint John the Baptist (1694) at the village of Shirkovo, the ensemble of the Trinity Church at the village of Otyalovo, the tomb of Liza Chaikina by Nikolai Tomsky in Peno, as well as an archeological monument.

In Voroshilovo, there is a local museum.
