= Lake Vselug =

Lake in Tver Oblast, Russia

- Озеро Вселуг (Russian)
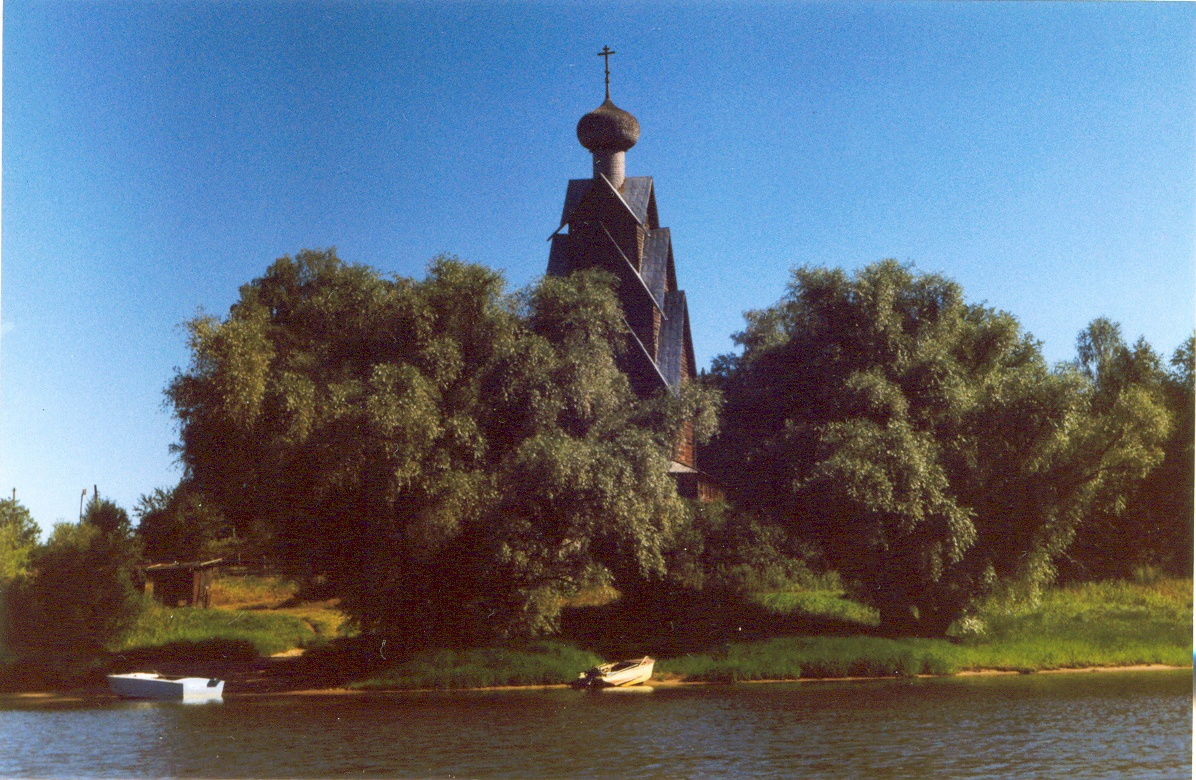
- The Shirkov Pogost as seen from the lake

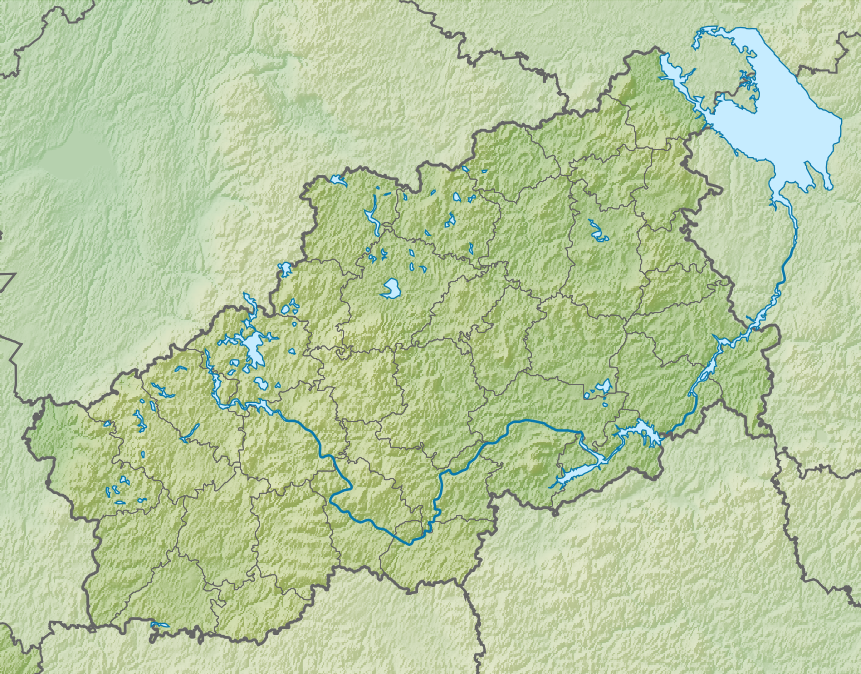
- Location within Tver Oblast Location within European Russia
- Location: Tver Oblast
- Coordinates: 56°54′58″N 33°10′43″E
- Primary inflows: Volga River
- Primary outflows: Volga River
- Basin countries: Russia
- Surface area: 30.4 square kilometres (11.7 mi^{2})

Lake Vselug (Russian: Озеро Вселуг) is a lake in Penovsky District of Tver Oblast, Russia. The Volga River flows through the lake in its upper course. The lake has a surface area of 30.4 square kilometres (11.7 mi^{2}).

Lake Vselug is the second one of four big lakes which make together Upper Volga Reservoir and which constitute the only remaining large natural lake system on the Volga. The other three lakes of the system are Lake Volgo, Lake Peno, and Lake Sterzh. Lake Vselug is located downstream of Lake Sterzh and upstream of Lake Peno.

The lake is oriented north to south and is separated from the adjacent lakes by short stretches of the Volga. The southern end of the lake is located by the village of Zabelino. The main tributary is the Runa River (right). The Kud River, the outflow of Lake Vitbino, joins the Volga right at the southern end of the lake.

The wooden Church of the Nativity of Saint John the Baptist (1694) at the village of Shirkovo, classified as a cultural heritage monument of the federal significance, is located at the bank of the lake.

The drainage basin of the lake includes the northwestern part of Ostashkovsky District and the northern part of Penovsky District.
