= Selizharovsky District =

Selizharovsky District Селижаровский район (Russian)
- District
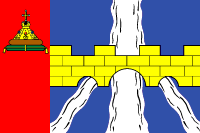
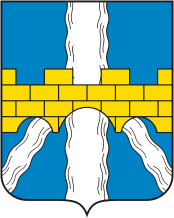
- Flag Coat of arms
- Location of Selizharovsky District in Tver Oblast
- Coordinates: 56°51′N 33°27′E
- Country: Russia
- Federal subject: Tver Oblast
- Established: 1 October 1929
- Administrative center: Selizharovo

Area
  - Total: 3,098 km^{2} (1,196 sq mi)

Population (2010 Census)
  - Total: 12,722
  - Density: 4.107/km^{2} (10.64/sq mi)
  - Urban: 52.9%
  - Rural: 47.1%

Administrative structure
  - Administrative divisions: 1 Urban settlements, 10 Rural settlements
  - Inhabited localities: 1 urban-type settlements, 370 rural localities

Municipal structure
  - Municipally incorporated as: Selizharovsky Municipal District
  - Municipal divisions: 1 urban settlements, 10 rural settlements
- Time zone: UTC+3 (MSK)
- OKTMO ID: 28550000
- Website: http://seligarovo.ru/

Selizharovsky District (Russian: Селижа́ровский райо́н) is an administrative and municipal district (raion), one of the thirty-six in Tver Oblast, Russia. It is located in the western central part of the oblast and borders with Ostashkovsky District in the north, Kuvshinovsky District in the northeast, Staritsky District in the east, Rzhevsky District in the southeast, Oleninsky District in the south, Nelidovsky District in the southwest, Andreapolsky District in the west, and with Penovsky District in the northwest. The area of the district is 3,098 square kilometers (1,196 sq mi). Its administrative center is the urban locality (an urban-type settlement) of Selizharovo. Population: 12,722 (2010 Census); 15,125 (2002 census); 18,092 (1989 Soviet census). The population of Selizharovo accounts for 52.9% of the district's total population.

== Geography ==
Selizharovsky District is located at the southern outskirts of the Valdai Hills. The whole area of the district belongs to the drainage basin of the Volga River. The Volga itself crosses the district, with a part of its course being Lake Volgo. Below Lake Volgo, the dam of Upper Volga Reservoir has been built. The main tributaries of the Volga within the district are the Zhukopa (right) and the Selizharovka (left). The Selizharovka is the outflow of lake Seliger. The southern part of the district belongs to the basin of the Tudovka River, a right tributary of the Volga.

== History ==
Since the Middle Ages, the area was at the border between the Novgorod Republic and the Principality of Smolensk, later at the border between the Lithuania and the Grand Duchy of Moscow. Eventually, it was transferred under control of the Grand Duchy of Moscow, and in 1547 Tsar Ivan the Terrible gave it to the Simonov Monastery which was located in Moscow. Selizharovo was first mentioned in 1504.

In the course of the administrative reform carried out in 1708 by Peter the Great, the area was included in Ingermanlandia Governorate (since 1710 known as Saint Petersburg Governorate), and in 1727 Novgorod Governorate split off. In 1772, Ostashkov was granted town status, and Ostashkovsky Uyezd of Novgorod Governorate was established, with the seat in Ostashkov. Almost all of area of the district was included in Ostashkovsky Uyezd, with the exception of the southeast of the district which belonged to Rzhevsky Uyezd. In 1775, Tver Viceroyalty was formed from the lands which previously belonged to Moscow and Novgorod Governorates, and the area was transferred to Tver Viceroyalty, which in 1796 was transformed to Tver Governorate.

On 12 July 1929, governorates and uyezds were abolished, and Selizharovsky District with the administrative center in the selo of Selizharovo was established. It belonged to Rzhev Okrug of Western Oblast. On August 1, 1930, the okrugs were abolished, and the districts were subordinated directly to the oblast. On January 29, 1935 Kalinin Oblast was established, and Selizharovsky District was transferred to Kalinin Oblast. In 1936, Selizharovsky District was renamed Kirovsky District. In 1937, Selizharovo was granted urban-type settlement status. During World War II, in 1941–1942, a considerable part of the district, including Selizharovo, was occupied by German troops. In February 1963, during the abortive administrative reform by Nikita Khrushchev, Kirovsky and Penovsky Districts were merged into Ostashkovsky District. On January 12, 1965, Selizharovsky District (which occupied the area of Kirovsky District) was re-established. In 1990, Kalinin Oblast was renamed Tver Oblast.

On 12 July 1929 Molodotudsky District, with the center in the selo of Molodoy Tud was created as well. It was a part of Rzhev Okrug of Western Oblast. On 1 February 1932 it was abolished. On March 5, 1935 Chertolinsky District with the administrative center in the selo of Chertolino was established. It was a part of Kalinin Oblast. On 20 March 1936 Chertolino was transferred to Rzhevsky District, and Chertolinsky District was renamed Molodotudsky. The administrative center was moved to Molodoy Tud. On 22 August 1958 Molodotudsky District was abolished and split between Kirovsky, Oleninsky, and Rzhevsky Districts.

Another district created on 12 July 1929 was Lukovnikovsky District, with the center in the selo of Lukovnikovo. It was a part of Rzhev Okrug of Western Oblast. On January 29, 1935 Lukovnikovsky District was transferred to Kalinin Oblast. On 14 November 1960 Lukovnikovsky District was abolished and split between Kirovsky, Novotorzhsky, Staritsky, and Rzhevsky Districts.

== Economy ==
=== Industry ===
There are enterprises of timber and food industries in the district, all of them located in Selizharovo.

=== Agriculture ===
The main agricultural specialization of the district is cattle breeding with meat and milk production.

=== Transportation ===
A railway line which connects Likhoslavl with Soblago via Torzhok and Kuvshinovo crosses the area of the district from east to west and passes Selizharovo. It is served by infrequent passenger traffic.

A paved road connecting Ostashkov and Rzhev crosses the district from north to south passing Selizharovo. There are also local roads with bus traffic originating from Selizharovo.

== Culture and recreation ==
The district contains eighty-three cultural heritage monuments of federal significance (four of them in Selizharovo) and additionally seven objects (one of them in Selizharovo) classified as cultural and historical heritage of local significance. The federally protected monuments include the Resurrection Church in Selizharovo, the Nativity Church in the selo of Pesochnya, the ensemble of the Church of the Virgin of Smolensk in the selo of Okovtsy, as well as two archeological sites.

Selizharovo hosts a local museum, which has expositions on the history of the area.
