= Lake Sterzh =

Lake in Tver Oblast, Russia

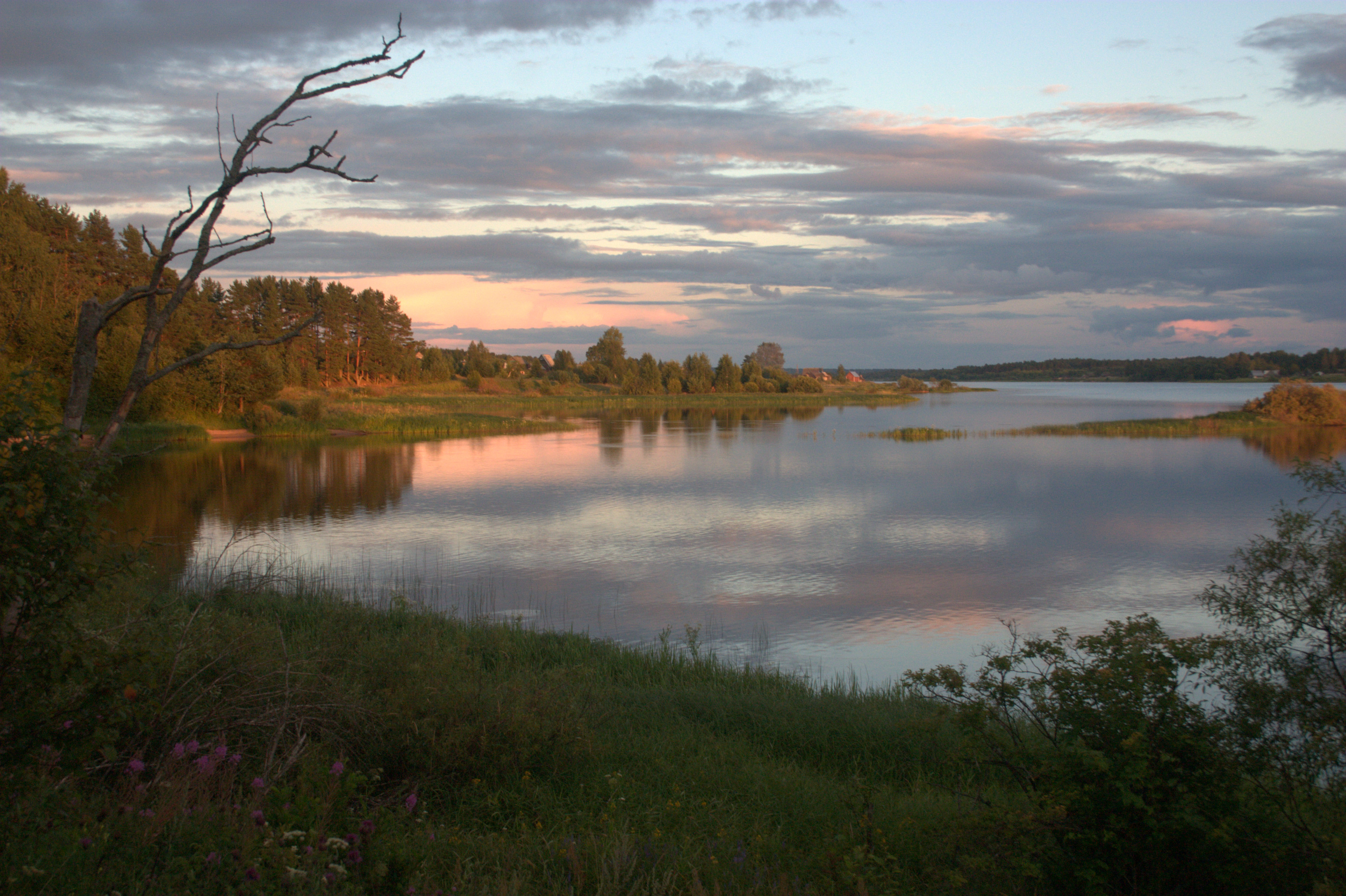

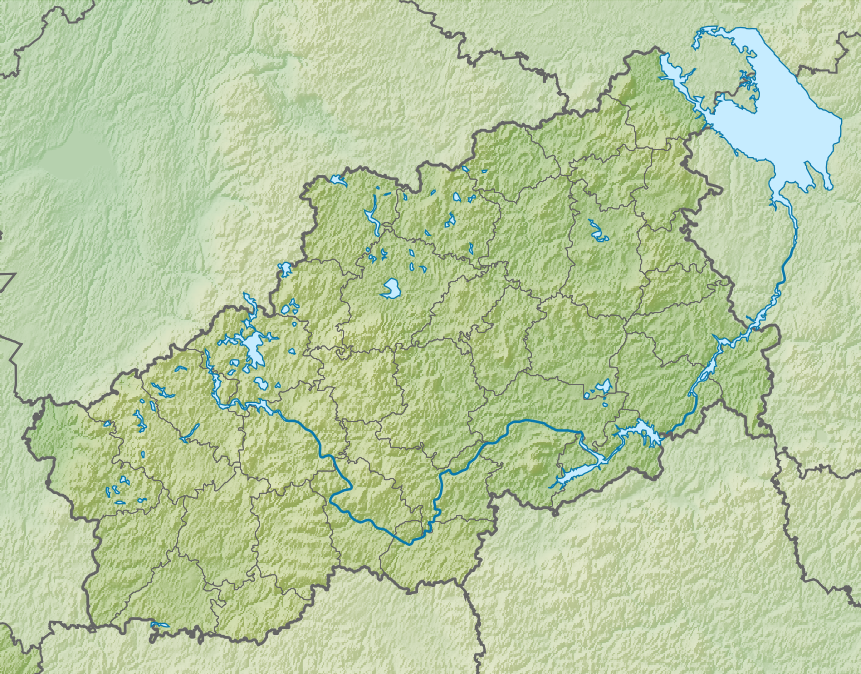
- Location within Tver Oblast Location within European Russia
- Location: Tver Oblast
- Coordinates: 57°10′7″N 32°36′19″E
- Primary inflows: Volga
- Primary outflows: Volga
- Basin countries: Russia
- Max. length: 12 kilometres (7.5 mi)
- Max. width: 1,500 metres (4,900 ft)
- Surface area: 17.9 km^{2} (7 sq mi)
- Average depth: 5 metres (16 ft)

Lake Sterzh (Стерж) is the third largest among the Valdai Lakes in Tver Oblast of Russia. It is the first lake through which the Volga flows.

== Geography ==
The lake's length is 12 kilometres (7.5 mi), its width is up to 1,500 metres (4,900 ft), and the average depth is 5 metres (16 ft). The surface area of the lake is 17.9 square kilometres (6.9 mi^{2}). The lake gives its name to the Sterzh Cross. The 167 cm cross, formerly situated on the bank of the lake, has now been exhibited in the Tver History Museum for over a century.

== Volga reservoir ==
Lake Sterzh is oriented north to south, with one bay stretching to the east. The Volga flows in the northern part of the lake. In the south, Lake Sterzh continues as Lake Vselug. Together with Lake Vselug, Lake Peno, and Lake Volgo it forms the Upper Volga Reservoir. The lake is shared between Ostashkovsky (north) and Penovsky (south) Districts of Tver Oblast.

The drainage basin of Lake Sterzh includes the northern part of Ostashkovsky District and minor areas in the northeast of Penovsky District.
