= Ostashkovsky District =

Ostashkovsky District Осташковский район (Russian)
- District
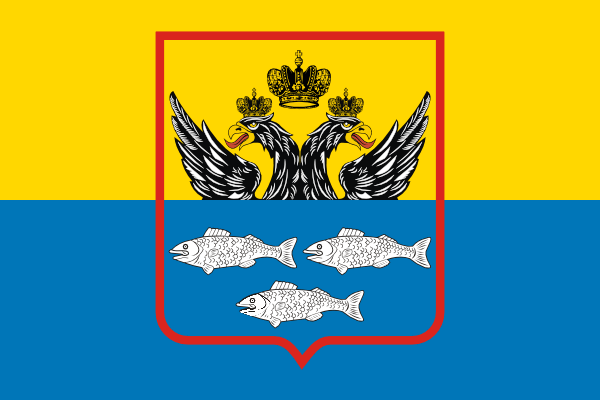
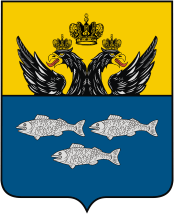
- Flag Coat of arms
- Location of Ostashkovsky District in Tver Oblast
- Coordinates: 57°09′N 33°06′E
- Country: Russia
- Federal subject: Tver Oblast
- Established: 1929
- Administrative center: Ostashkov

Area
  - Total: 3,200 km^{2} (1,200 sq mi)

Population (2010 Census)
  - Total: 23,761
  - Density: 7.4/km^{2} (19/sq mi)
  - Urban: 76.1%
  - Rural: 23.9%

Administrative structure
  - Administrative divisions: 1 Urban settlements, 10 Rural settlements
  - Inhabited localities: 1 cities/towns, 247 rural localities

Municipal structure
  - Municipally incorporated as: Ostashkovsky Municipal District
  - Municipal divisions: 1 urban settlements, 10 rural settlements
- Time zone: UTC+3 (MSK)
- OKTMO ID: 28645000
- Website: http://www.ostashkov-seliger.ru/

Ostashkovsky District (Russian: Оста́шковский райо́н) is an administrative and municipal district (raion), one of the thirty-six in Tver Oblast, Russia. It is located in the northwest of the oblast and borders with Demyansky District of Novgorod Oblast in the north, Firovsky District in the northwest, Kuvshinovsky District in the east, Selizharovsky District in the south, Penovsky District in the southwest, and with Maryovsky District of Novgorod Oblast in the west. The area of the district is 3,200 square kilometers (1,200 sq mi). Its administrative center is the town of Ostashkov. Population: 23,761 (2010 Census); 7,357 (2002 census); 8,921 (1989 Soviet census). The population of Ostashkov accounts for 76.1% of the district's total population.

== Geography ==
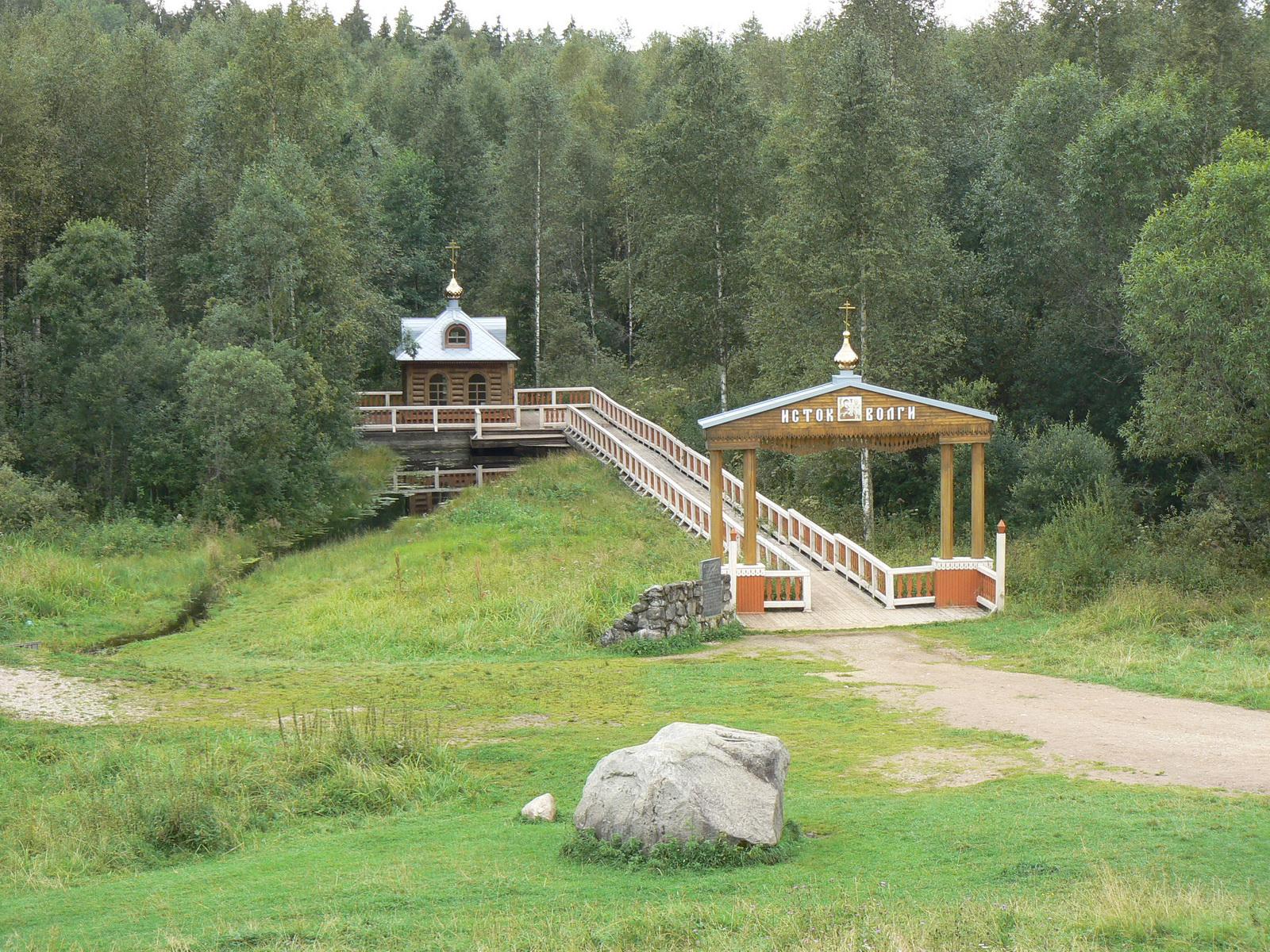
The source of the Volga

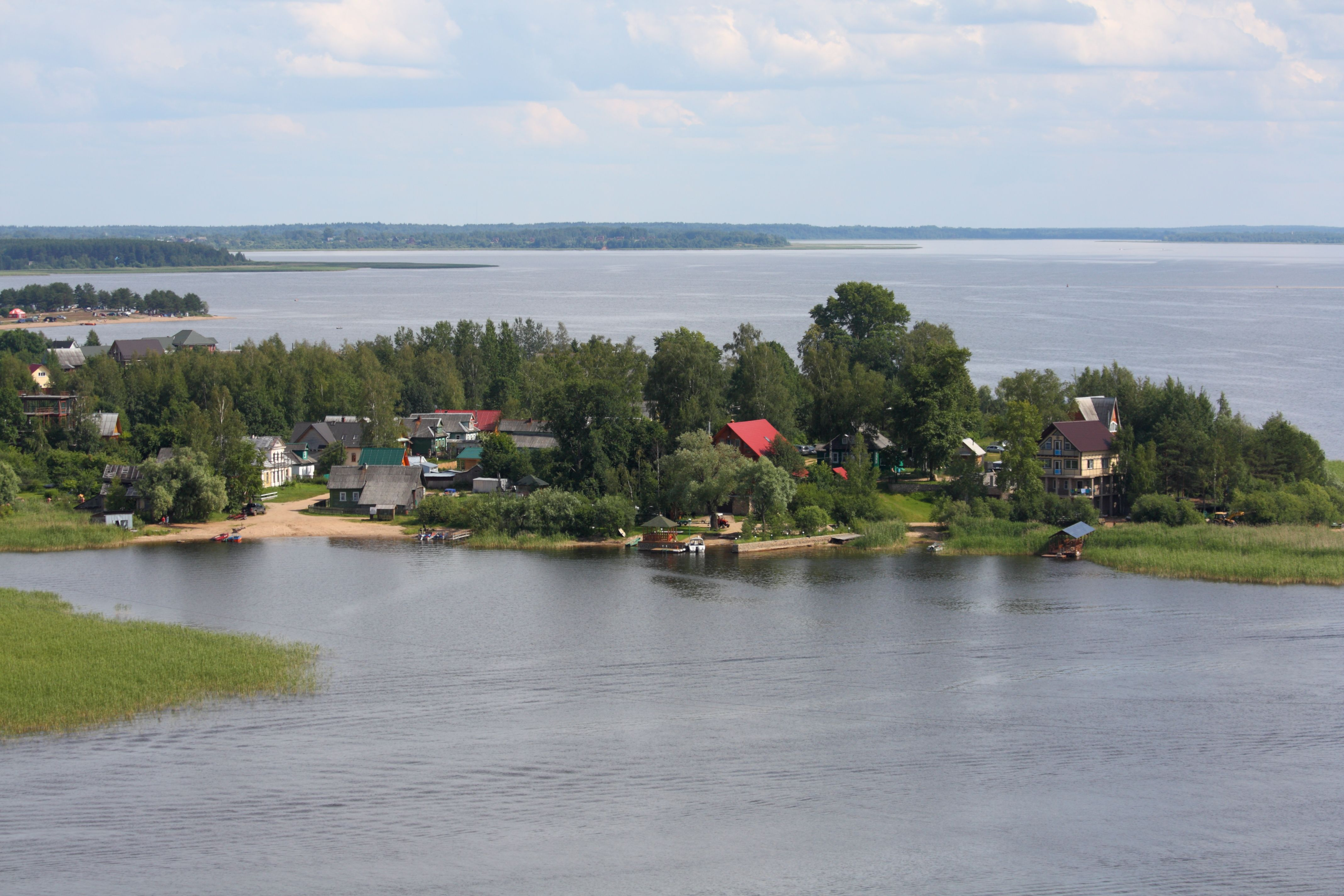
The village of Peski

The major part of the district belongs to the drainage basin of the Volga River. The source of the Volga is located in the district, in the selo of Volgoverkhovye. The district is locates in the southern outskirts of the Valdai Hills, and there is a large lake district in the area of Ostashkovsky District. The biggest lakes in the area are Lake Seliger, with the town of Ostashkov located on its shore, Lake Volgo and Lake Sterzh (parts of Upper Volga Reservoir), and Lake Sig. Both Seliger (via the Selizharovka River) and Sig drain into the Volga, Verkhyaya Volga Reservoir is built in the upper course of the Volga, and the Volga flows through Lake Volgo. Minor areas in the northwest of the district belong to the basin of the Pola River in the basin of the Neva, and rivers in the northeast of the district drain to the Shlina River, also in the drainage basin of the Neva. The Neva drains into the Baltic Sea, and the Volga drains into the Caspian Sea. Thus, the divide between the Atlantic Ocean and the Caspian Sea runs through the district.

== History ==
In the course of the administrative reform carried out in 1708 by Peter the Great, the area was included into Ingermanlandia Governorate (since 1710 known as Saint Petersburg Governorate), and in 1727 Novgorod Governorate split off. In 1772, Ostashkov was granted town status, and Ostashkovsky Uyezd of Novgorod Governorate was established, with the seat in Ostashkov. In 1775, Tver Viceroyalty was formed from the lands which previously belonged to Moscow and Novgorod Governorates, and the area was transferred to Tver Viceroyalty, which in 1796 was transformed to Tver Governorate.

On 1 October 1929, governorates and uyezds were abolished, and Ostashkovsky District with the administrative center in the town of Ostashkov was established. It belonged to Velikiye Luki Okrug of Western Oblast. On August 1, 1930 the okrugs were abolished, and the districts were subordinated directly to the oblast. On January 29, 1935 Kalinin Oblast was established, and Ostashkovsky District was transferred to Kalinin Oblast. During World War II, the district was not occupied by German troops but until 1943 stayed in the immediate vicinity of the front lines. In February 1963, during the abortive administrative reform by Nikita Khrushchev, Kirovsky and Penovsky Districts were merged into Ostashkovsky District. On January 12, 1965 Selizharovsky District (which occupied the same area as Kirovsky District), and on December 27, 1973 Penovsky District were re-established. On 12 January 1965 Andreapolsky District was established in the areas which previously belonged to Toropetsky and Ostashkovsky Districts. In 1990, Kalinin Oblast was renamed Tver Oblast.

== Administrative and municipal status ==
Within the framework of administrative divisions, Ostashkovsky District is one of the thirty-six in the oblast. The town of Ostashkov serves as its administrative center. A closed urban-type settlement of Solnechny, located geographically within the limits of the district, is incorporated separately as an okrug—an administrative unit with the status equal to that of the districts.

As a municipal division, the district is incorporated as Ostashkovsky Municipal District. Solnechny Okrug is incorporated separately from the district as Solnechny Urban Okrug.

== Economy ==
=== Industry ===
Industry dominates in the economy of the district. As of 2014, the industrial output represented over 90% of the GDP. The main industrial enterprise in the district is Ostashkov Leather Factory. Additionally, enterprises of timber, textile, and food industries are present.

=== Agriculture ===
The main agricultural specialization of the district is cattle breeding with meat and milk production.

=== Transportation ===
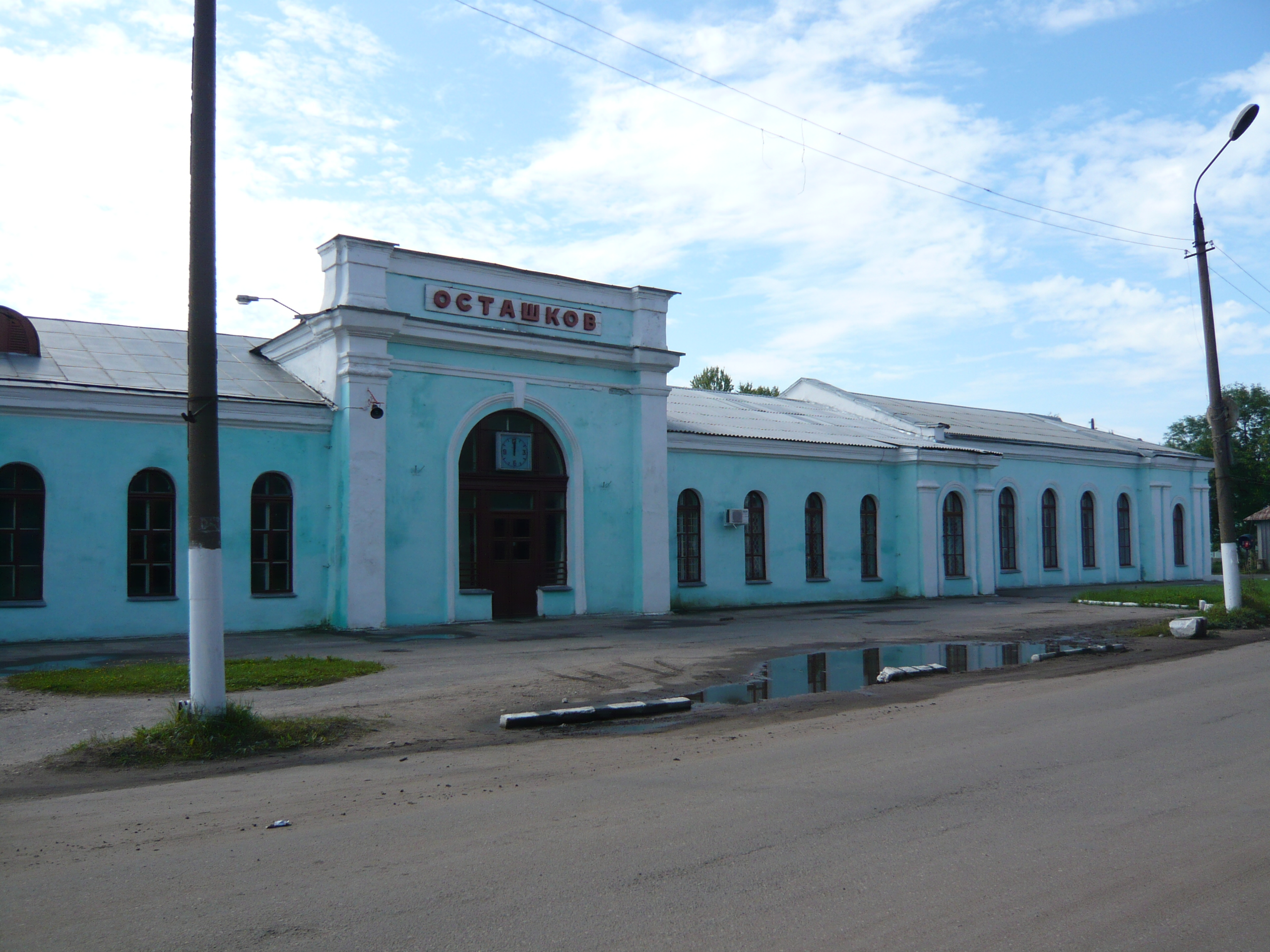
Ostashkov railway station

The railway connecting Bologoye with Velikiye Luki crosses the district from northeast to southwest. Ostashkov is the main railway station within the district. There is infrequent passenger traffic.

Ostashkov is connected by road with Torzhok via Kuvshinovo. This road crosses the district, and in Torzhok it has access to M10 highway, connecting Moscow and Saint Petersburg. Ostashkov is further connected with Staritsa via Selizharovo, with Andreapol via Peno, and with Demyansk and Maryovo. There are also local roads, with bus traffic originating from Ostashkov.

== Culture and recreation ==
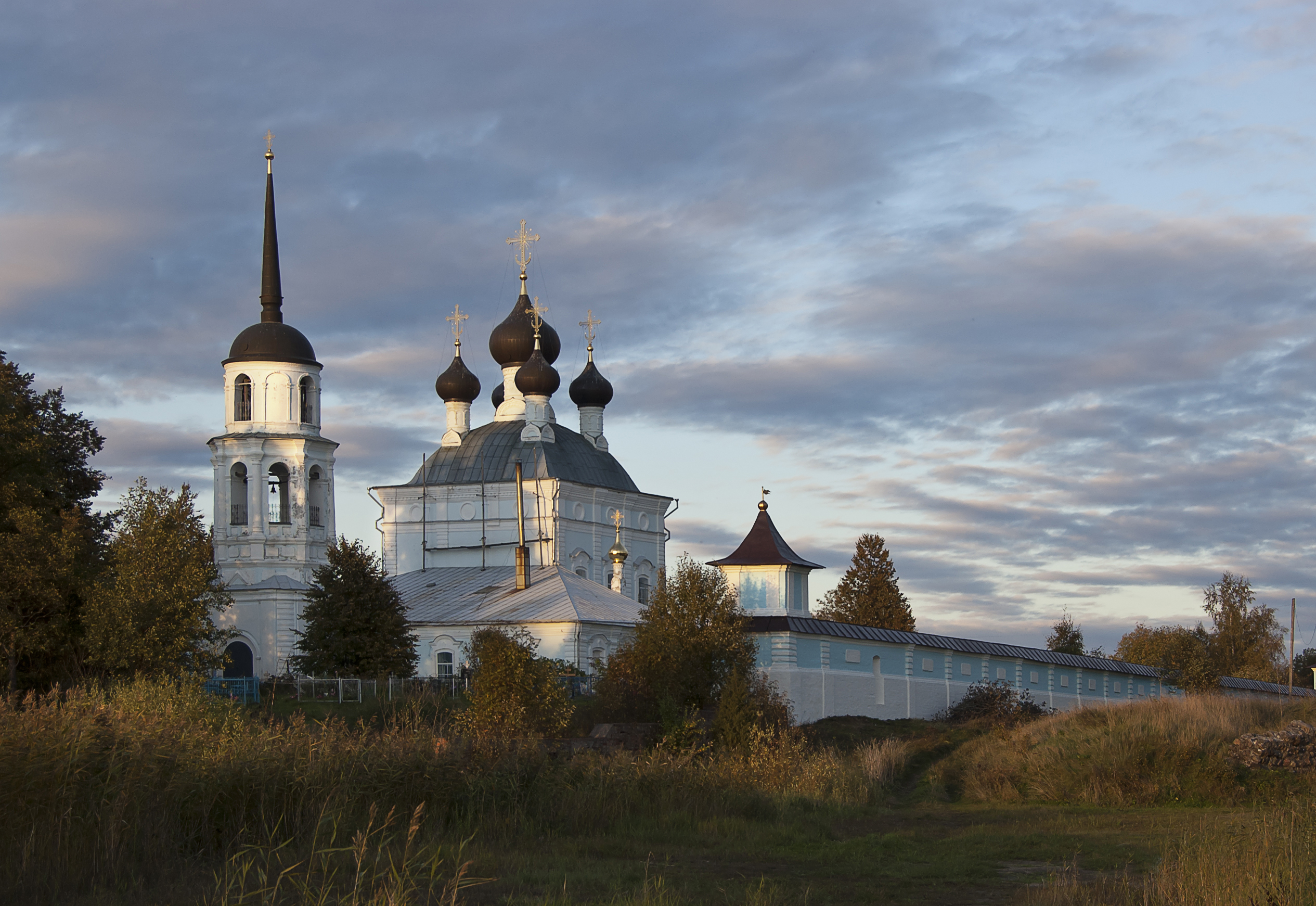
The Church of the Entry of the Theotokos into the Temple in Kravotyn

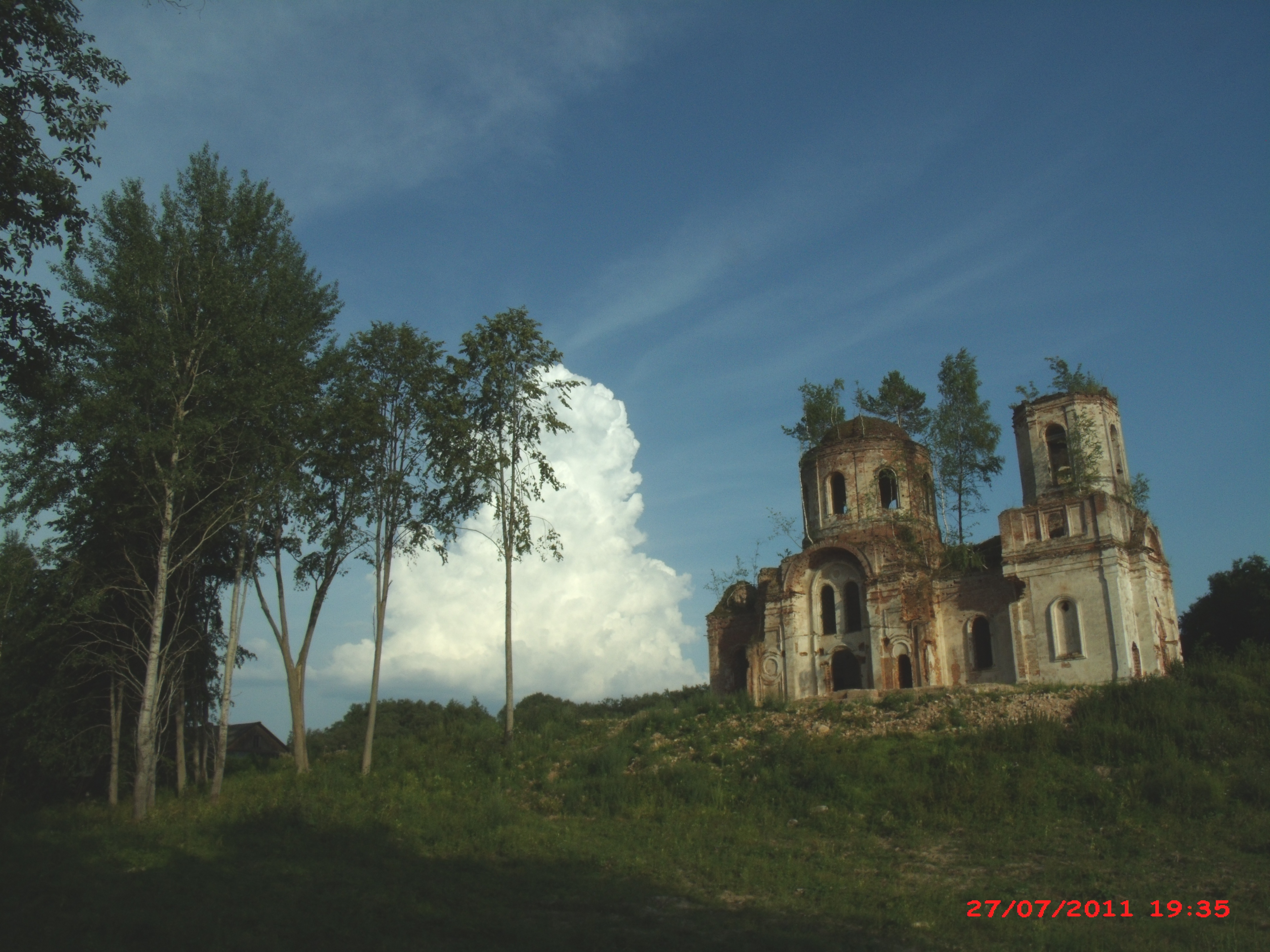
The Trinity Church in Perevolok

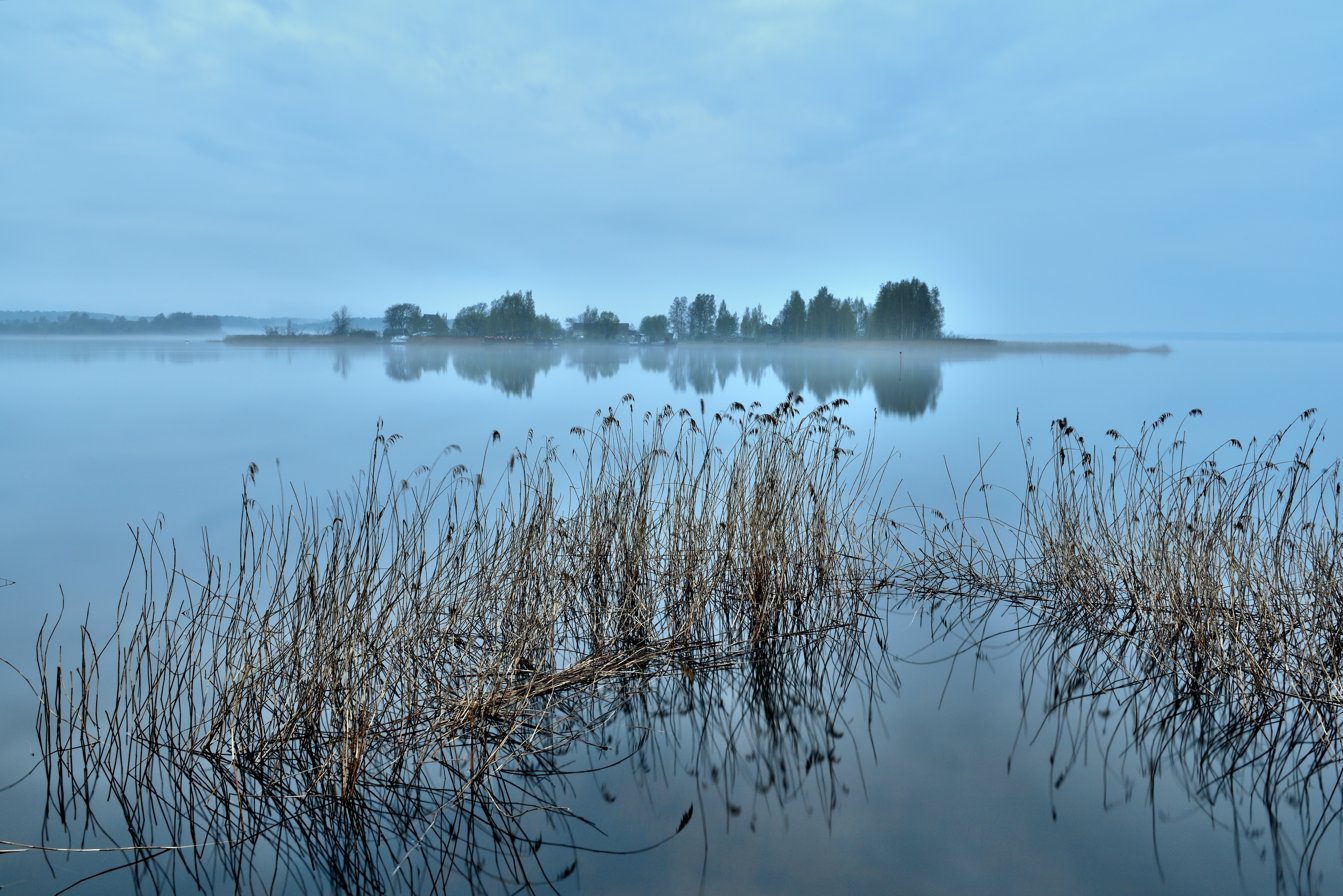
Lake Seliger. Ostashkov. View of the island of Voroniy

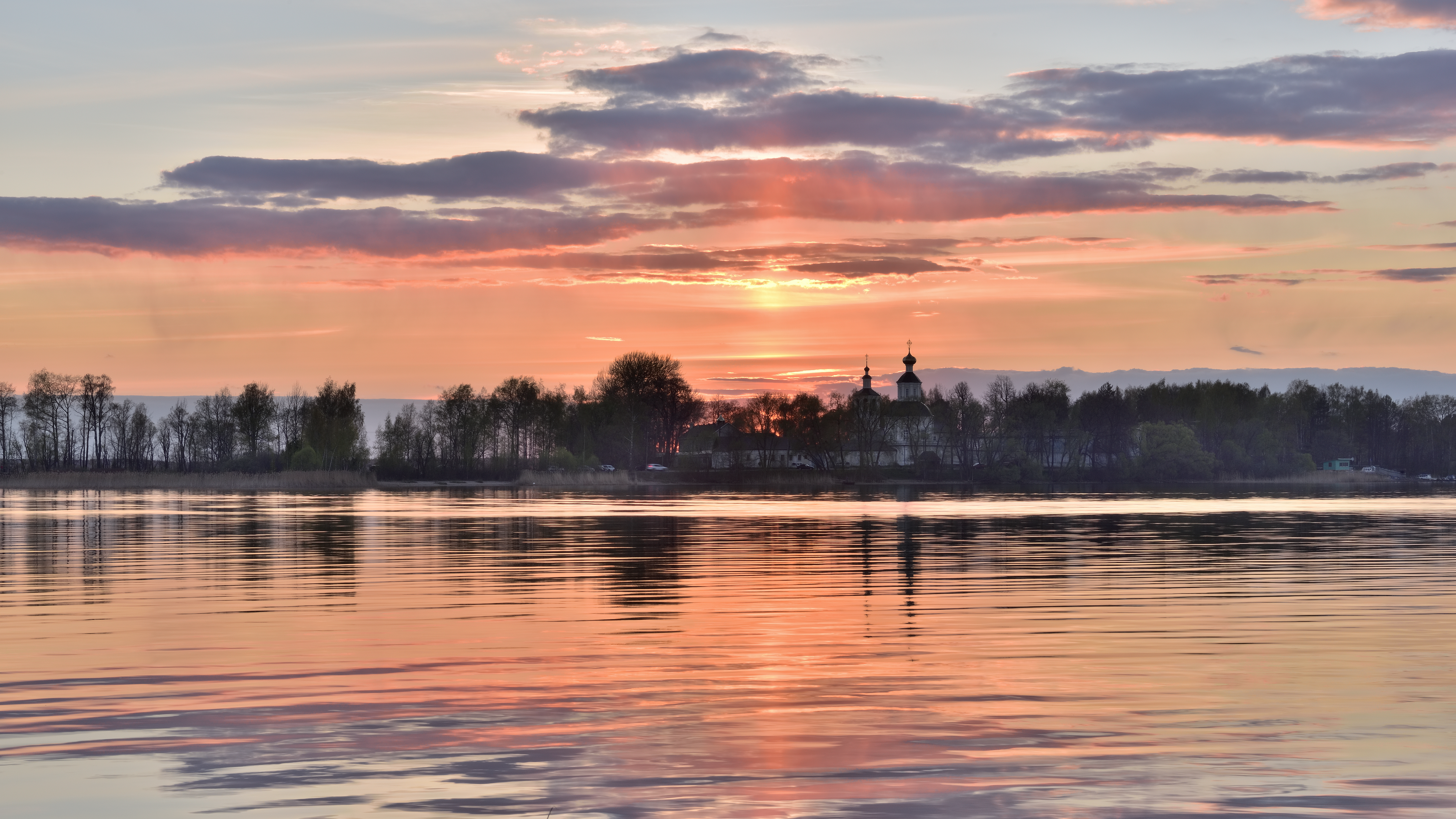
Spring sunset over Lake Seliger

The district contains 187 cultural heritage monuments of federal significance (125 of them located in Ostashkov) and additionally 287 objects classified as cultural and historical heritage of local significance (118 of them in Ostashkov). Essentially, the whole center of Ostashkov consists of listed buildings. Other federal monuments include the Nilova Pustyn monastery, located on an island on Lake Seliger, the Novyye Yeltsy Estate in the selo of Novyye Yeltsy, as well as a number of churches in the villages of the district and several archaeological sites.

Ostashkovsky District Museum was founded in 1889 and is located in Ostashkov. It has displays on local history and ethnography. In 1986, the Seliger Area Nature Museum was open in the settlement of Rogozha, and in 2002, the Museum of the Source of the Volga was open in Volgoverkhovye.
