= Selizharovo =

Selizharovo Селижарово
- Work settlement
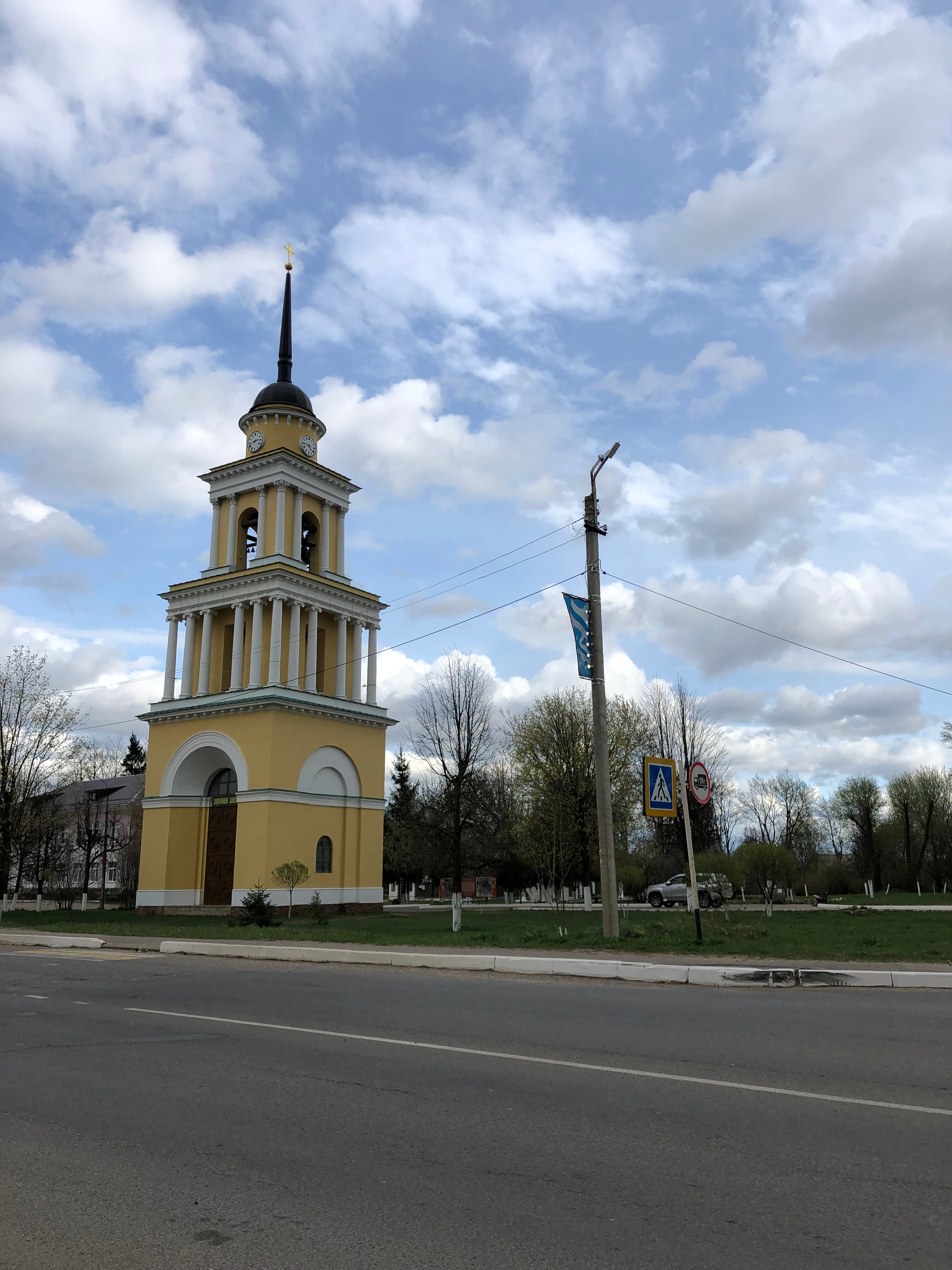

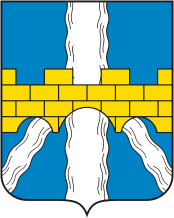
- Coat of arms
- Interactive map of Selizharovo
- Location of Selizharovo Selizharovo (Tver Oblast)
- Coordinates: 56°51′N 33°27′E
- Country: Russia
- Federal subject: Tver Oblast
- Administrative district: Selizharovsky District
- First mentioned: 1504
- Urban-type settlement status since: 1937

Population (2010 Census)
  - Total: 6,725
  - Estimate (2021): 5,931 (−11.8%)

Administrative status
  - Capital of: Selizharovsky District

Municipal status
  - Municipal district: Selizharovsky Municipal District
  - Urban settlement: Selizharovo Urban Settlement
  - Capital of: Selizharovsky Municipal District, Selizharovo Urban Settlement
- Time zone: UTC+3 (MSK)
- Postal codes: 172200, 172201
- OKTMO ID: 28550000051

Selizharovo (Russian: Селижа́рово) is an urban locality (an urban-type settlement) and the administrative center of Selizharovsky District of Tver Oblast, Russia situated at the confluence of the Selizharovka and Volga Rivers. Population: 6,725 (2010 census); 7,330 (2002 census); 7,668 (1989 Soviet census).

== History ==
Selizharovo was first mentioned in 1504. In 1547 Tsar Ivan the Terrible gave it to the Simonov Monastery which was located in Moscow.

In the course of the administrative reform carried out in 1708 by Peter the Great, the area was included into Ingermanlandia Governorate (since 1710 known as Saint Petersburg Governorate), and in 1727 Novgorod Governorate split off. In 1772, Ostashkov was granted town status, and Ostashkovsky Uyezd of Novgorod Governorate was established, with the seat in Ostashkov. Selizharovo was included in Ostashkovsky Uyezd. In 1775, Tver Viceroyalty was formed from the lands which previously belonged to Moscow and Novgorod Governorates, and the area was transferred to Tver Viceroyalty, which in 1796 was transformed to Tver Governorate. In 1862, settlements which formerly belonged to the monastery were merged into Selizharovsky Posad, which eventually was mentioned as Selizharovo. In 1916, the railway construction was completed.

On 1 October 1929, governorates and uyezds were abolished, and Selizharovsky District with the administrative center in the selo of Selizharovo was established. It belonged to Rzhev Okrug of Western Oblast. On August 1, 1930 the okrugs were abolished, and the districts were subordinated directly to the oblast. On January 29, 1935 Kalinin Oblast was established, and Selizharovsky District was transferred to Kalinin Oblast. In 1936, Selizharovsky District was renamed Kirovsky District. In 1937, Selizharovo was granted urban-type settlement status. During World War II, in 1941, Selizharovo was occupied by German troops between October 1941 and January 15, 1942. In February 1963, during the abortive administrative reform by Nikita Khrushchev, Kirovsky and Penovsky Districts were merged into Ostashkovsky District. On January 12, 1965 Selizharovsky District (which occupied the area of Kirovsky District) was re-established. In 1990, Kalinin Oblast was renamed Tver Oblast.

== Economy ==
=== Industry ===
There are enterprises of timber and food industries. At Selizharovo, there is a 350-meter (1,150 ft) tall guyed TV mast, built in 1971.

=== Transportation ===
A railway line which connects Likhoslavl with Soblago via Torzhok and Kuvshinovo passes Selizharovo. It is served by infrequent passenger traffic.

A paved road connecting Ostashkov and Rzhev runs through Selizharovo as well. There are also local roads with bus traffic originating from Selizharovo.

== Culture and recreation ==
Selizharovo contains four cultural heritage monuments of federal significance and additionally one object classified as cultural and historical heritage of local significance. The federally protected monuments include the Resurrection Church in Selizharovo, two residential houses and a military cemetery.

Selizharovo hosts a local museum, which has expositions on the history of the area.
