= Lake Peno =

Lake in Tver Oblast, Russia

Lake Peno Озеро Пено
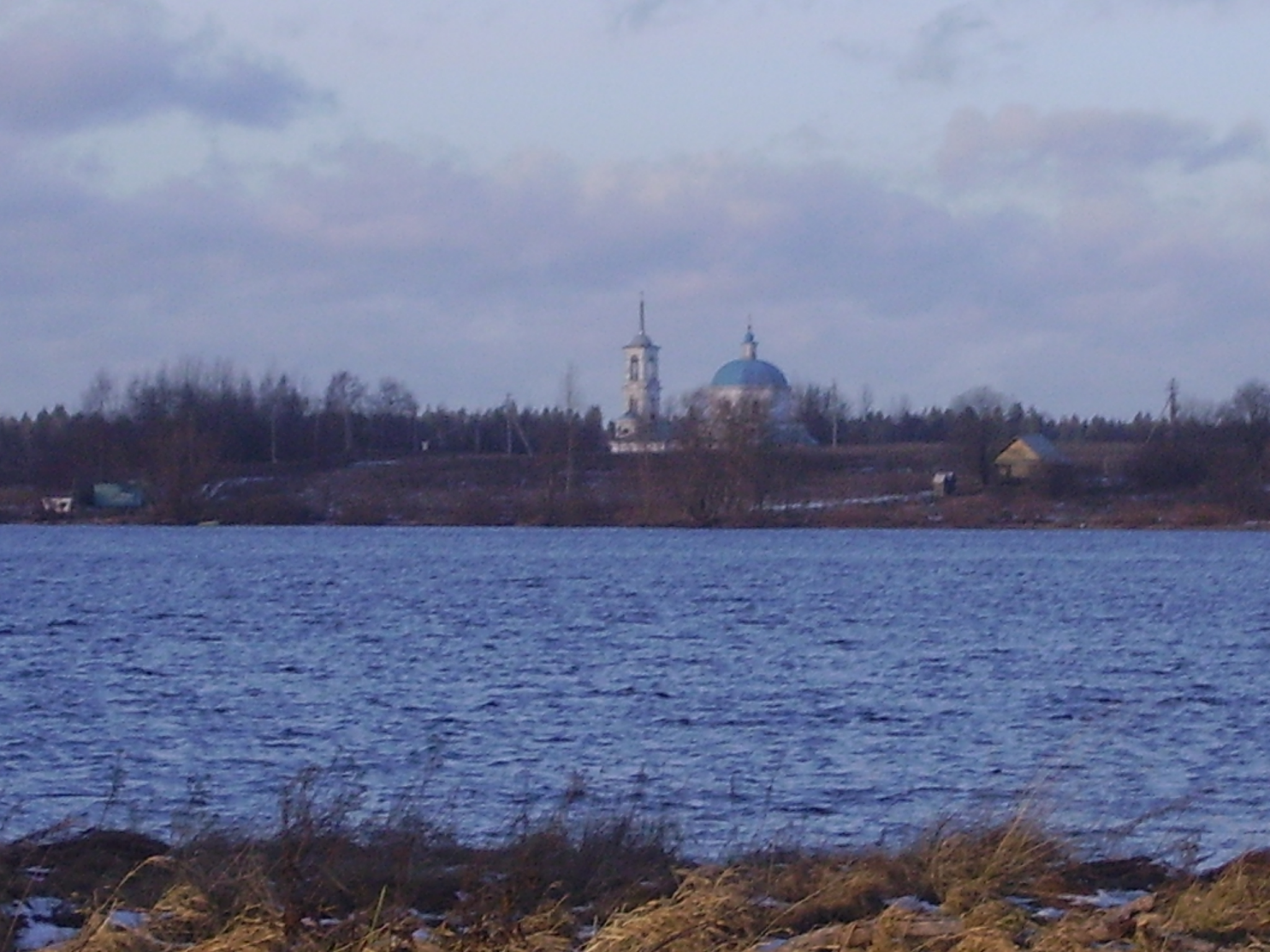
- Northwestern shore of the lake with the village of Vseluki

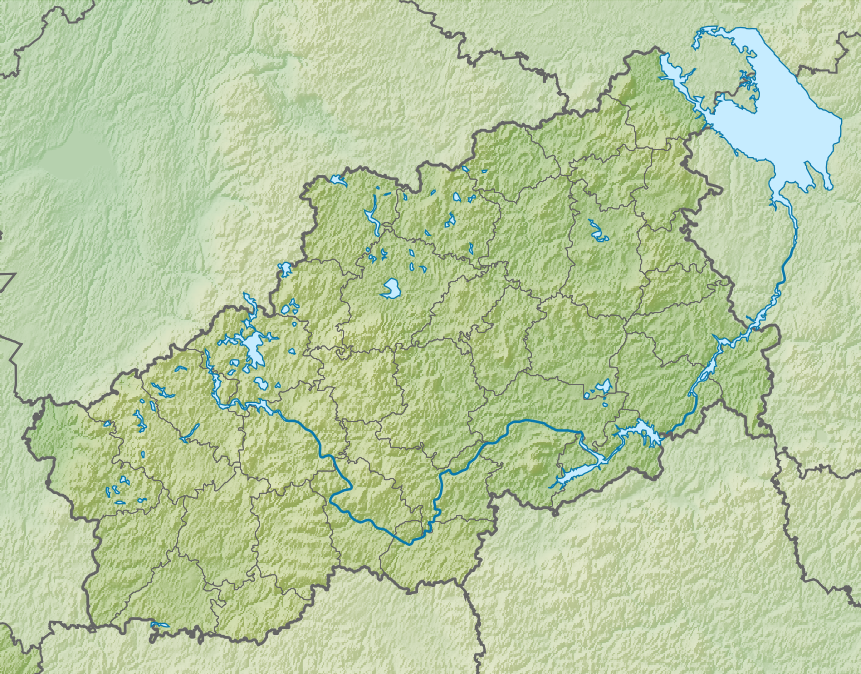
- Location within Tver Oblast Location within European Russia
- Location: Tver Oblast
- Coordinates: 56°55′55.44″N 32°42′31.08″E
- Primary inflows: Volga River
- Primary outflows: Volga River
- Basin countries: Russia
- Surface area: 16.7 square kilometres (6.4 mi^{2})

Lake Peno (Russian: Озеро Пено) is a lake in Penovsky District of Tver Oblast, Russia. The Volga River flows through the lake in its upper course. The lake has a surface area of 16.7 square kilometres (6.4 mi^{2}).

Lake Peno is the third of four big lakes which together make Upper Volga Reservoir and which constitute the only remaining large natural lake system on the Volga. The other three lakes of the system are Lake Volgo, Lake Vselug, and Lake Sterzh. Lake Peno is located downstream of Lake Vselug and upstream of Lake Volgo.

The lake is oriented north to south and is separated from the adjacent lakes by short stretches of the Volga. The northern end of the lake is located by the village of Zabelino. The Kud River, the outflow of Lake Vitbino, joins the Volga right at the northern end of the lake. The urban-type settlement of Peno is located at the southern end of the lake.

The drainage basin of the lake includes the whole northern part of Penovsky District and the northwestern part of Ostashkovsky District.
