= Lake Volgo =

Lake in Tver Oblast, Russia

Lake Volgo Озеро Волго
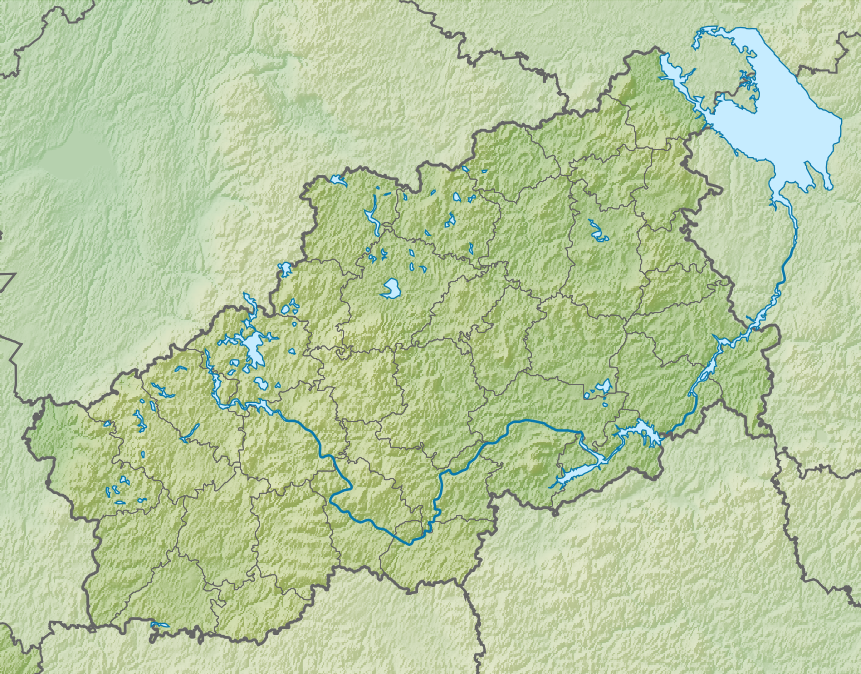
- Location within Tver Oblast Location within European Russia
- Location: Tver Oblast
- Coordinates: 56°54′58″N 33°10′43″E
- Primary inflows: Volga River
- Primary outflows: Volga River
- Catchment area: 3,500 square kilometres (1,400 mi^{2})
- Basin countries: Russia
- Surface area: 61 square kilometres (24 mi^{2})

Lake Volgo (Russian: Озеро Волго) is a lake in Ostashkovsky, Penovsky, and Selizharovsky Districts of Tver Oblast, Russia. The Volga River flows through the lake in its upper course. The lake has a surface area of 61 square kilometres (24 mi^{2}), and the area of its drainage basin is 3,500 square kilometres (1,400 mi^{2}). The urban-type settlement of Peno is located on the western bank of the lake.

Lake Volgo is the lowest of four big lakes which together form the Upper Volga Reservoir and which constitute the only remaining large natural lake system on the Volga. The other three lakes of the system are Lake Peno, Lake Vselug, and Lake Sterzh. Lake Volgo is located downstream of Lake Peno and consists of two parts (sometimes referred as Volgo I and Volgo II), one bent to the northeast and then to the southwest, and the second, which is bigger, oriented approximately west to east. The two parts are separated by a narrow channel. The Volga flows out from the easternmost corner, at the selo of Selishche, where the dam of the reservoir is located. The total length of the lake is about 30 kilometres (19 mi), the average depth is 2 metres (6.6 ft).

Since Lake Volgo is the lowest of the four Upper Volga lakes, its drainage basin includes the drainage basins of the others. This comprises most of Penovsky District, the southwestern part of Ostashkovsky District, the northwestern part of Selizharovsky District, as well as the southeastern corner of Andreapolsky District and minor areas in the north of Nelidovsky District. The Zhukopa River and the Kocha River are the biggest tributaries of the lake.

The lake is popular for recreational fishing.
