= Peno, Russia =

Peno Пено
- Work settlement
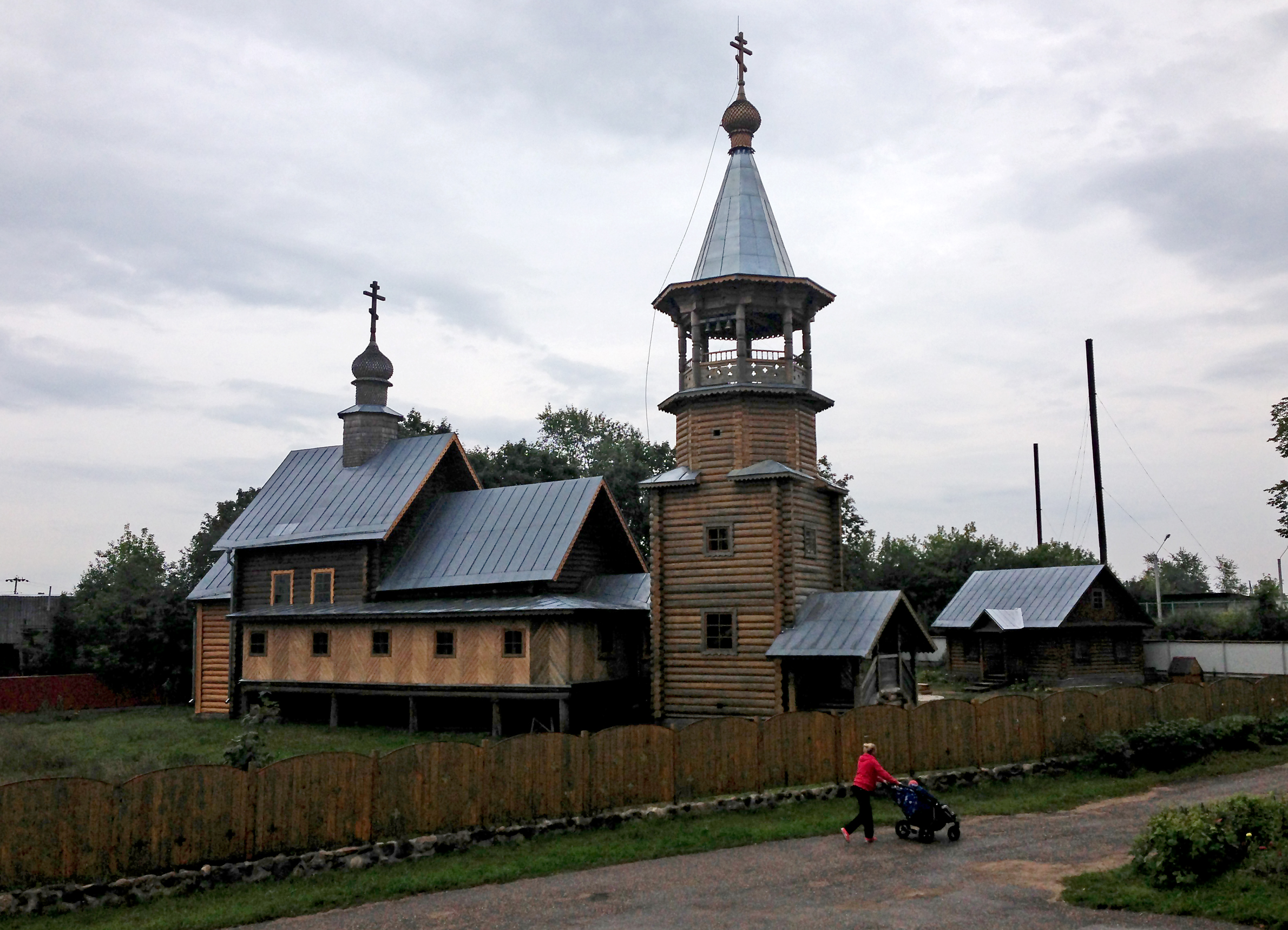
- Interactive map of Peno
- Location of Peno Peno (Tver Oblast)
- Coordinates: 56°56′30″N 32°44′07″E
- Country: Russia
- Federal subject: Tver Oblast
- Administrative district: Penovsky District

Population (2010 Census)
  - Total: 4,220
  - Estimate (2021): 3,359 (−20.4%)

Administrative status
  - Capital of: Penovsky District

Municipal status
  - Municipal district: Penovsky Municipal District
  - Urban settlement: Penovskoye Urban Settlement
  - Capital of: Penovsky Municipal District, Penovskoye Urban Settlement
- Time zone: UTC+3 (MSK)
- Postal code: 172770
- OKTMO ID: 28646151051

Peno (Russian: Пе́но) is an urban-type settlement and the administrative center of Penovsky District of Tver Oblast, Russia. It is located between Lake Peno and Lake Volgo, both located in the course of the Volga River and belonging to Upper Volga Reservoir. Population: 4,220 (2010 census); 5,358 (2002 census); 6,212 (1989 Soviet census).

== History ==
Peno was founded in the 1900s as a settlement to serve the railway station. It was located in Ostashkovsky Uyezd of Tver Governorate. From 1924, the settlement of Peno was made a center of a volost. In 1926, Peno was granted urban-type settlement status.

On 1 October 1929, governorates and uyezds were abolished, and Penovsky District with the administrative center in the settlement of Peno was established. It belonged to Velikiye Luki Okrug of Western Oblast. On August 1, 1930, the okrugs were abolished, and the districts were subordinated directly to the oblast. On January 29, 1935 Kalinin Oblast was established, and Ostashkovsky District was transferred to Kalinin Oblast. During World War II, Peno was occupied by German troops. In February 1963, during the abortive administrative reform by Nikita Khrushchev, Kirovsky and Penovsky Districts were merged into Ostashkovsky District. On December 27, 1973, Penovsky District was re-established. In 1990, Kalinin Oblast was renamed Tver Oblast.

== Economy ==
=== Industry ===
There are enterprises of timber, construction, and food industries in Peno. Formerly, timber industry provided the major part of the GDP of the district, however, currently it experiences a deep crisis.

=== Transportation ===
The railway connecting Bologoye with Velikiye Luki runs through Peno. There is infrequent passenger traffic.

A paved road connects Ostashkov with Zapadnaya Dvina via Peno and Andreapol. There are local roads as well. There is bus traffic in the district.

== Culture and recreation ==
In Peno, the tomb of Liza Chaikina by Nikolai Tomsky in Peno, as well as the central square where she was executed, are classified as cultural and historical heritage of federal significance.
