= Selizharovka =

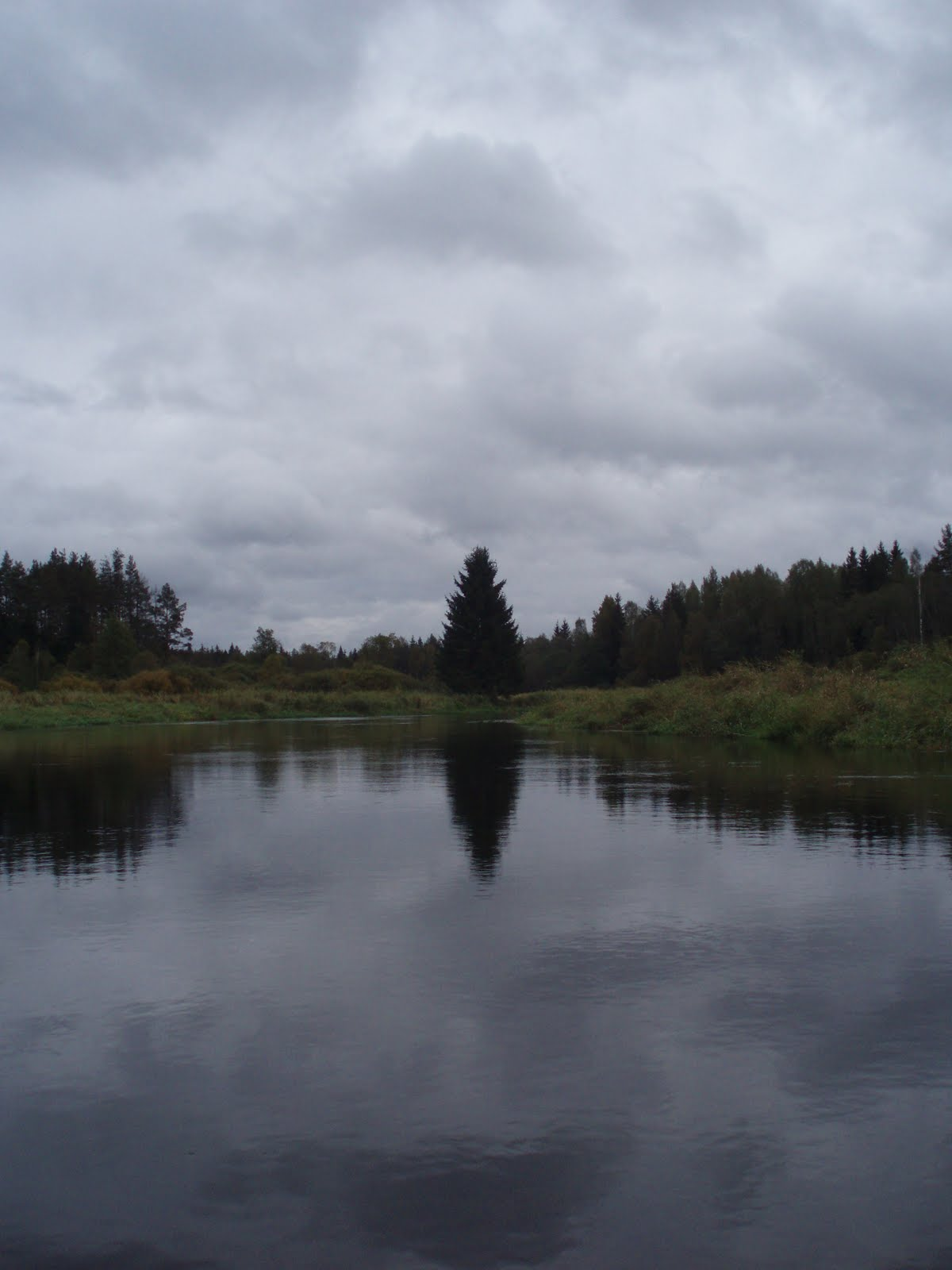
- Native name: Селижаровка (Russian)

Location
- Country: Russia
- Oblast: Tver Oblast

Physical characteristics
- Source: Lake Seliger
  - location: Valdai Hills
- Mouth: Volga
  - location: Selizharovo
  - coordinates: 56°51′11″N 33°27′18″E
- Length: 36 km (22 mi)
- Basin size: 2,950 km^{2} (1,140 sq mi)
- Discharge
  - average: 20 m^{3}/s (710 cu ft/s)

Basin features
- Progression: Volga→ Caspian Sea

The Selizharovka (Russian: Селижа́ровка) is a river in Ostashkovsky and Selizharovsky Districts of Tver Oblast, Russia, a left tributary of the Volga. The length of the river is 36 kilometres (22 mi), and the area of its drainage basin is 2,950 square kilometres (1,140 mi^{2}). It is one of the uppermost substantial tributaries of the Volga. The settlement of Selizharovo is located near the river mouth.

The Selizharovka is the only outflow of Lake Seliger, the biggest natural lake of the Upper Volga basin. The river originates at the southern end of the lake, at the village of Nizhniye Kotitsy. It flows southeast, crosses into Selizharovsky District, and joins the Volga at the urban-type settlement of Selizharovo.

The drainage basin of the Selizharovka includes the major part of Ostashkovsky District, south of Demyansky District of Novgorod Oblast, as well as minor areas in Firovsky District of Tver Oblast.
