= Sterzh Cross =

1133 stone cross in Russia

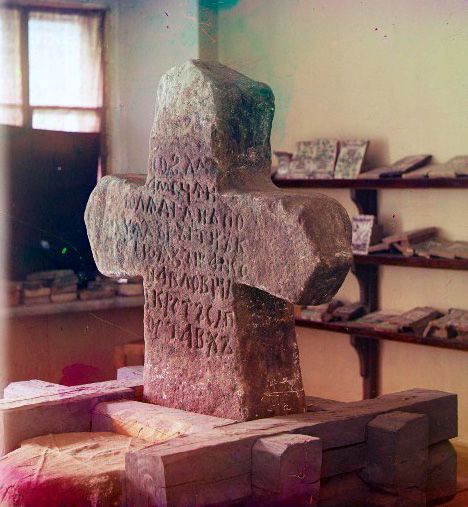
Sterzh Cross, as photographed c. 1912 by Prokudin-Gorsky

Sterzh Cross is a stone cross formerly situated on the bank of the Sterzh Lake. Named for the lake, it is now exhibited in the Tver History Museum, where it has been for over a century. Its height is 167 cm.

The cross was erected by Ivanko Pavlovich, a posadnik from Novgorod, in 1133. The inscription on the cross reads: "On 14 July, 6641 we started to dig a channel, whereupon I, Ivanko Pavlovich, erected this cross".
