= Andreapol =

Town in Tver Oblast, Russia

Andreapol Андреаполь
- Town
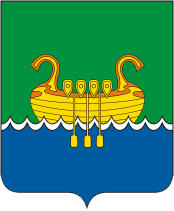
- Coat of arms
- Interactive map of Andreapol
- Location of Andreapol Andreapol (Tver Oblast)
- Coordinates: 56°39′N 32°15′E
- Country: Russia
- Federal subject: Tver Oblast
- Administrative district: Andreapolsky District
- Urban settlementSelsoviet: Andreapol
- Founded: 1906
- Town status since: 1967
- Elevation: 220 m (720 ft)

Population (2010 Census)
  - Total: 8,286
  - Estimate (2021): 6,956 (−16.1%)

Administrative status
  - Capital of: Andreapolsky District, Andreapol Urban Settlement

Municipal status
  - Municipal district: Andreapolsky Municipal District
  - Urban settlement: Andreapol Urban Settlement
  - Capital of: Andreapolsky Municipal District, Andreapol Urban Settlement
- Time zone: UTC+3 (MSK)
- Postal codes: 172800, 172801
- OKTMO ID: 28602101001
- Website: www.andreapol.ru

Andreapol (Russian: Андреа́поль) is a town and the administrative center of Andreapolsky District in Tver Oblast, Russia, located on the Valdai Hills on the left bank in the upper course of the Western Dvina. Population: 8,286 (2010 census); 9,317 (2002 census); 9,610 (1989 Soviet census); 12,000 (1968).

== Paleontology ==
Fossils of Early Carboniferous (probably Visean) organisms were found within Andreapol territory. During the construction of an artesian well on the site of house No. 12, Berezovaya Street, a partial specimen of the tree-like lycophyte Stigmaria ficoides 30 cm long and 4 cm wide was discovered in the clay layer. Higher, in the limestone layers, remains of the brachiopod Gigantoproductus superior were found. Another specimen of S. ficoides was found on the shore of a lake among Neolithic artifacts, which may indicate its use for ritual purposes. A trunk of lepidophyte Lepidodendron sp. was collected from the southern outskirts of the city, in the vicinity of Sovetsky Lane, near the bank of the Western Dvina. Fossils are also known from the surrounding area of the city, including the area of the Bobrovets village, 14.5 km north of Andreapol: shoots of Sigillaria elegans and Lepidodendron obovatum as well as a strobilus of Lepidostrobus sp. In 2011–2016, all these specimens were given to the Andreapolsky Krayevedcheskiy Museum.

== History ==
The Dubna Volost, currently a part of Andreapol, was mentioned in the chronicles in 1489. After several wars between Moscow and Lithuania, during which the area was transferred to Lithuania and back, it was in 1508 again included to the Grand Duchy of Moscow.

In the course of the administrative reform carried out in 1708 by Peter the Great, the area was included into Ingermanlandia Governorate (since 1710 known as Saint Petersburg Governorate), and in 1727 Novgorod Governorate split off. In 1772, as a result of the First Partition of Poland, Pskov Governorate was created, and the area on the right bank of the Western Dvina was included into Toropetsky Uyezd of Pskov Governorate. In 1777, Pskov Governorate was transformed into Pskov Viceroyalty, and in 1796, the viceroyalty was abolished, and Pskov Governorate was restored.

Between 1810 and 1843, a spa resort was operating in Andreapol, at the time Adreyano Pole. Between 1904 and 1907, the construction of the railroad to Bologoye was completed. In 1906, the station of Andreapol was opened, and the selo of Andreapol, which included villages of Dubna, Andreyano Pole, and Gorka, was established. The name of Andreapol is an adaptation of Andreyano Pole.

On August 1, 1927, Pskov Governorate was abolished, and Leningrad Oblast was established. Toropetsky Uyezd was abolished as well, and Leninsky District, with the administrative center in the selo of Khotilitsy was established. It belonged to Velikiye Luki Okrug of Leningrad Oblast. In 1928, the district center was moved to Andreapol. On June 17, 1929, the district was transferred to Western Oblast. On August 1, 1930, the okrugs were abolished, and the districts were subordinated directly to the oblast. On January 29, 1935 Kalinin Oblast was established, and Leninsky District was transferred to Kalinin Oblast. In 1938, Andreapol was granted urban-type settlement status. Between September 1941 and January 1942, during World War II, Andreapol was occupied by German troops. On August 22, 1944, the district was transferred to newly established Velikiye Luki Oblast. On October 2, 1957, Velikiye Luki Oblast was abolished, and Leninsky District was transferred back to Kalinin Oblast. In February 1963, during the abortive administrative reform by Nikita Khrushchev, Leninsky District was merged into Toropetsky District. On January 12, 1965, Andreapolsky District was established in the areas which previously belonged to Toropetsky and Ostashkovsky Districts. In 1967, Andreapol was granted town status. In 1990, Kalinin Oblast was renamed Tver Oblast.

On July 24, 2000, an F2 tornado hit the area, resulting in 3 injuries across a 600 meter wide and 26 km long path. Andreapol would be hit again on August 2, 2021, by an F3 tornado. The tornado damaged around 1500 homes, uprooted trees, killed three, and injured ten. The tornado traveled 7.5 km across a 500 meter wide path. The tornado was part of a tornado outbreak that produced 20 reported tornadoes across Belarus & Tver Oblast.

== Administrative and municipal status ==
Within the framework of administrative divisions, Andreapol serves as the administrative center of Andreapolsky District. As an administrative division, it is incorporated within Andreapolsky District as Andreapol Urban Settlement. As a municipal division, this administrative unit also has urban settlement status and is a part of Andreapolsky Municipal District.

== Economy ==
Forests cover around 70% of the district's territory. As a result of that, logging industry provides substantial revenue for the town. There is a large saw-mill plant in Andreapol as well as porcelain production. Agriculture is also of fundamental importance to the town's economy.

=== Transportation ===
The railway connecting Bologoye with Velikiye Luki passes Andreapol. There is infrequent passenger traffic.

A paved road connecting Ostashkov with Zapadnaya Dvina via Peno runs via Andreapol. There are local roads as well. There is bus traffic in the district.

== Military ==
The town is home to Andreapol air base, an important interceptor aircraft base guarding Moscow.

== Culture and recreation ==
Andreapol contains three cultural heritage monuments of local significance. Two of them are monuments to soldiers fallen in World War II, and the third one is an archaeological site. There is a local museum in Andreapol.
