= Ostashkov =

Town in Tver Oblast, Russia

Ostashkov Осташков
- Town
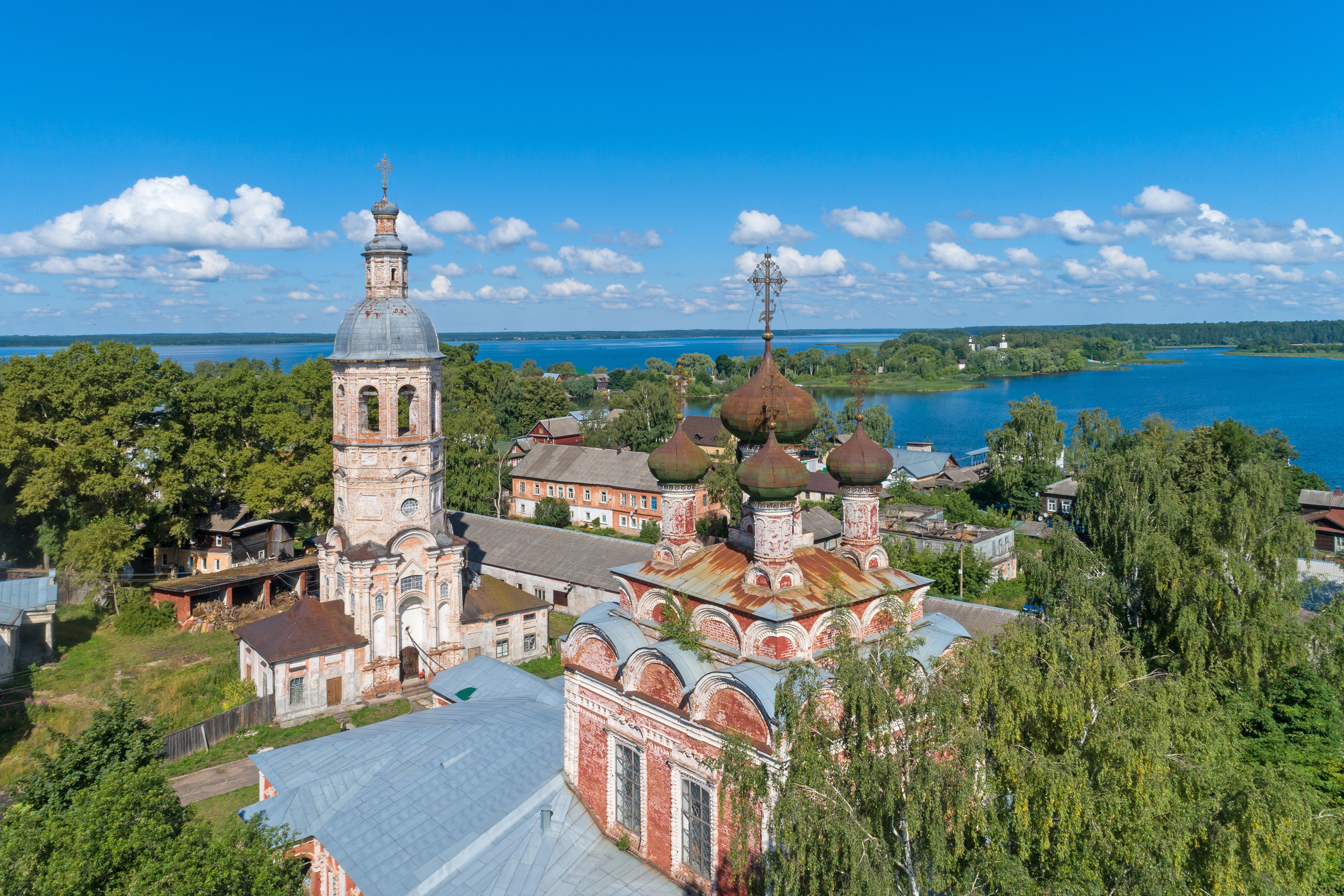
- Holy Trinity Cathedral

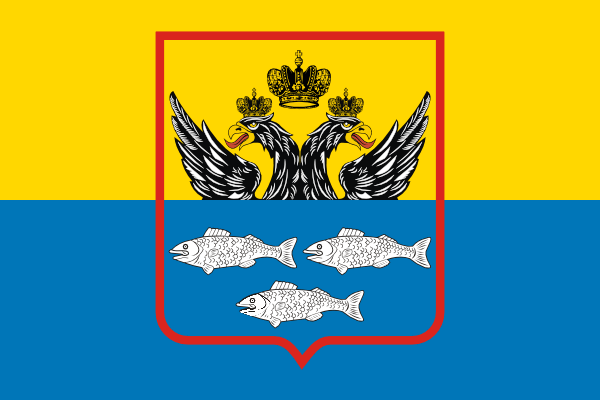
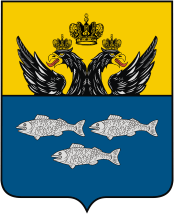
- Flag Coat of arms
- Interactive map of Ostashkov
- Location of Ostashkov Ostashkov (European Russia) Ostashkov (Russia)
- Coordinates: 57°09′N 33°06′E
- Country: Russia
- Federal subject: Tver Oblast
- Administrative district: Ostashkovsky District
- Urban settlementSelsoviet: Ostashkov
- Founded: 1770
- Town status since: 1770
- Elevation: 210 m (690 ft)

Population (2010 Census)
  - Total: 18,088
  - Estimate (2021): 16,674 (−7.8%)

Administrative status
  - Capital of: Ostashkovsky District, Ostashkov Urban Settlement

Municipal status
  - Municipal district: Ostashkovsky Municipal District
  - Urban settlement: Ostashkov Urban Settlement
  - Capital of: Ostashkovsky Municipal District, Ostashkov Urban Settlement
- Time zone: UTC+3 (MSK)
- Postal codes: 172730, 172734, 172735, 172749
- OKTMO ID: 28645101001

Ostashkov (Russian: Оста́шков) is a town and the administrative center of Ostashkovsky District in Tver Oblast, Russia, on a peninsula at the southern shore of Lake Seliger, 199 kilometers (124 mi) west of Tver, the administrative center of the oblast. Population: 18,088 (2010 census); 20,660 (2002 census); 27,401 (1989 Soviet census).

== History ==
=== Early developments ===
The island of Klichen was first mentioned in a letter sent by Grand Duke Algirdas of Lithuania to the Ecumenical Patriarch of Constantinople in 1371. After the island was pillaged by Novgorod pirates several years later, two of Klichen's surviving inhabitants, Ostashko and Timofey, moved to the mainland, where they founded the villages Ostashkovo and Timofeyevo, respectively. The former belonged to the Moscow Patriarchs, and the latter to the Joseph-Volokolamsk Monastery. In 1770, both villages were merged into the town of Ostashkov.

Ostashkov is commonly regarded as one of the finest Russian provincial towns. Its main streets were laid out in Neoclassical style after the plans of Ivan Starov (1772). Local landmarks include the Ascension Church (1689), the Trinity Cathedral (1697), the Monastery of the Sign (1673, 1730s, 1880s), and the mid-18th century Zhitny Cloister. There is also a fanciful column erected by the people of Ostashkov in 1787 to mark a spot where a wooden fort (1587) used to stand. The town's pleasant architecture and attractive setting by the lake combine to make Ostashkov one of the most popular resorts in Western Russia.

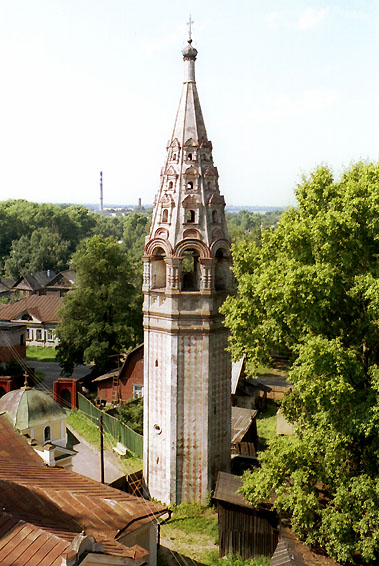
The 17th-century bell tower of the Resurrection Cathedral in Ostashkov

The well-known Nilov Monastery is on Stolobny Island, about 10 kilometers (6.2 mi) north from Ostashkov. It was the place where the Ostashkov Special Camp of the NKVD was and where roughly 6,300 Polish policemen and prisoners of war were kept before they were executed in Tver. Approximately 4,300 of their comrades, held in Kozelsk, were around this time executed in Smolensk Oblast at Stalin's order in April and May 1940, in what is now known as the Katyn massacre.

In 1772, Ostashkov was granted town status, and Ostashkovsky Uyezd of Novgorod Governorate was established, with the seat in Ostashkov. In 1775, Tver Viceroyalty was formed from the lands which previously belonged to Moscow and Novgorod Governorates, and the area was transferred to Tver Viceroyalty, which in 1796 was transformed to Tver Governorate.

On 1 October 1929, governorates and uyezds were abolished, and Ostashkovsky District with the administrative center in Ostashkov was established. It belonged to Velikiye Luki Okrug of Western Oblast. On August 1, 1930, the okrugs were abolished, and the districts were subordinated directly to the oblast. On January 29, 1935 Kalinin Oblast was established, and Ostashkovsky District was transferred to Kalinin Oblast. In February 1963, during the abortive administrative reform by Nikita Khrushchev, Kirovsky and Penovsky Districts were merged into Ostashkovsky District.

=== Second World War ===
During World War II, Ostashkov was not occupied by German troops but until 1943 stayed in the immediate vicinity of the front lines. Soviet flotilla on the lake Seliger was involved in evacuation of Leningrad and Kalinin industrial equipment, military supplies, wounded and refugees.

In the period 1939 to 1941, during the first years of World War II, the monastery at Stolobny Island, about 10 km (6.2 mi) north of Ostashkov, was a prisoner-of-war camp of the Russian secret service NKVD, which held approximately 7,000 Poles who had been taken captive by the Soviet Union as a result of the Molotov–Ribbentrop Pact. Between April 3 and April 19, 1940, 6,311 Polish officers from the POW camp were executed by shooting as part of the Katyn massacre, and buried near Mednoye.

On 25 September 1941 the frontline approached the town, and local authorities were ordered to evacuate all the industrial equipment from Ostashkov to Bely Gorodok. Only flotilla which were still involved in evacuation of the town were left.

The barges and ships were under constant bombings by Luftwaffe. On 7 October 1941 Colonel Belov ordered to evacuate flotilla and workshops towards Kalinin but after front near Rzhev collapsed, the flotilla returned from Selizharovo to Lake Seliger and stationed on the Krapivnya river. After the Germans entered the village of Selizharovo, all the barges were dispersed along the river and covered by trees and bushes. Crews were ready to destroy their barges with explosives.

However Germans failed to capture Ostashkov and the front line was stabilized. Due to German occupation of Kalinin the only way to supply the troops near Ostashkov was Lake Seliger waterway. Soviet lake flotilla command faced German bombardments in harsh winter conditions when the barges were blocked by ice. During spring 1942 flotilla faced the threat to be crushed by ice and washed away by the floods. However all the barges survived the spring and became ready to the 1942 navigation. As the northern lake shore was occupied, all the northern waterways were under shelling by German artillery. The new waterways across the Khrestnoye, Seremo and Glubokoye lakes, which were not considered navigable earlier, were used for evacuation of the wounded and shipping the military supplies. During the German air raids steamers and barges were hiding near the islands. Wooden shores also served as a shelter for the ships.

Ostashkov workshop which remained in the town, repaired the damaged ships. As the Ostashkov tannery was evacuated to Kazakhstan the only industries remaining in the town were: workshop, power plant, mechanized bakery and mill. All of them were mined in case of capture by Germans. The power plant was operated by several workers and it was often bombed by Luftwaffe. It also lacked fuel and power plant workers had to disassemble the wooden buildings inside the power plant territory and use them as a fuel.

There were 63 hospitals in the city. All of them were powered from the local power plant. Some of them were bombed by German aviation. All the evacuated factory buildings were used as a military warehouses. Food and military supplies were transported to the front lines by barges and narrow gauge railway.

The frontline was in a swampy and wooded area. Both sides built many trenches, pillboxes and infrastructure. In summer 1942 most of the Ostashkov area was liberated from German occupation and the frontline was moved far away from the town.

In January 1943 most of the evacuated industries were returned into the town. Fish factory, woodworking plant, mechanized bakery, power plant, printing house, tannery and ship repairing workshops functioned in Ostashkov.

=== Post-war period ===
On January 12, 1965, Selizharovsky District (which occupied the same area as Kirovsky District), and on December 27, 1973, Penovsky District were re-established. In 1990, Kalinin Oblast was renamed Tver Oblast.

Nowadays the town is popular among tourists from Moscow and Saint Petersburg as a nearby resort near the Seliger lake. Educational forum held since 2005 at the lake shore near Ostashkov.

The lake also attracts thousands of campers from all over the nearby cities. Ostashkov itself also attracts tourists because it contains a lot of cultural heritage monuments. Since September 30, 2018 Russian Railways established regular train connection with steam locomotive in addition to regular diesel powered trains. Such move of promoting local tourism by using old steam locomotive and old time - styled traincars, was first of its kind in Russia, and soon was followed by another tourism sites in Russia(such as Ruskeala in Karelia).

== Administrative and municipal status ==
Within the framework of administrative divisions, Ostashkov serves as the administrative center of Ostashkovsky District. As an administrative division, it is incorporated within Ostashkovsky District as Ostashkov Urban Settlement. As a municipal division, this administrative unit also has urban settlement status and is a part of Ostashkovsky Municipal District.

== Economy ==
=== Industry ===
The main industrial enterprise in Ostashkovsky District is Ostashkov Leather Factory. Additionally, enterprises of timber, textile, and food industries are present.

=== Transportation ===
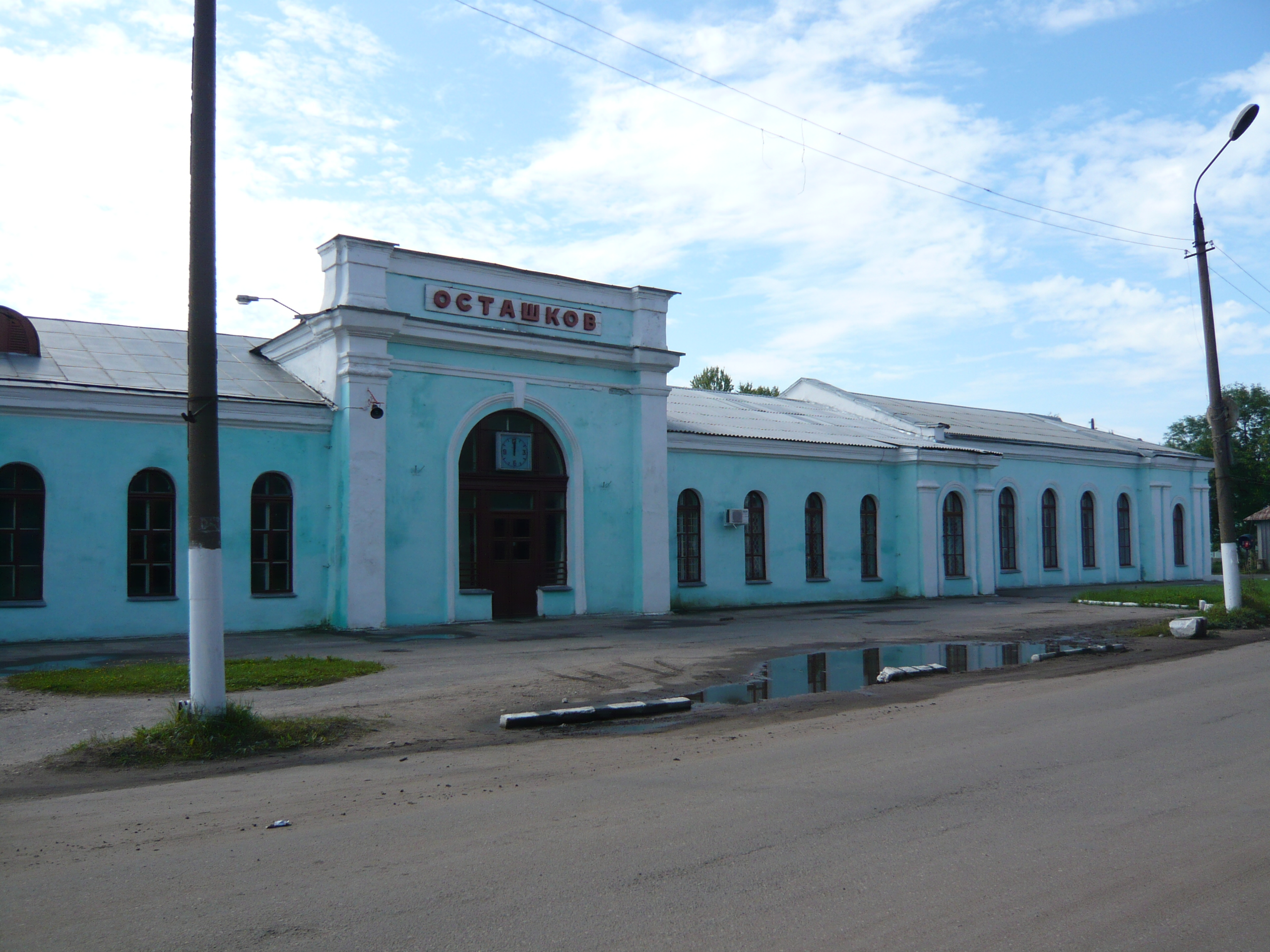
Ostashkov railway station

The railway connecting Bologoye with Velikiye Luki runs through Ostashkov. There are daily suburb trains to Bologoye and Velikiye Luki (except for Monday and Wednesday). There is also regular(on Saturday) steam locomotive train connection with Bologoe(station located on the Moscow - Saint Petersburg railway). Such move of promoting local tourism by using old steam locomotive and old time - styled train cars, with ticket price equal to ordinary suburb train, was first of its kind in Russia.

There are also suburb trains going to Kuvshinovo twice a week (on Monday and Friday). There are infrequent trains to Saint Petersburg and Moscow, mostly during summer touristic season.

Ostashkov is connected by road with Torzhok via Kuvshinovo. This road has access to M10 highway, connecting Moscow and Saint Petersburg. Ostashkov is further connected with Staritsa via Selizharovo, with Andreapol via Peno, and with Demyansk and Maryovo. There are also local roads, with bus traffic originating from Ostashkov.

== Culture and recreation ==
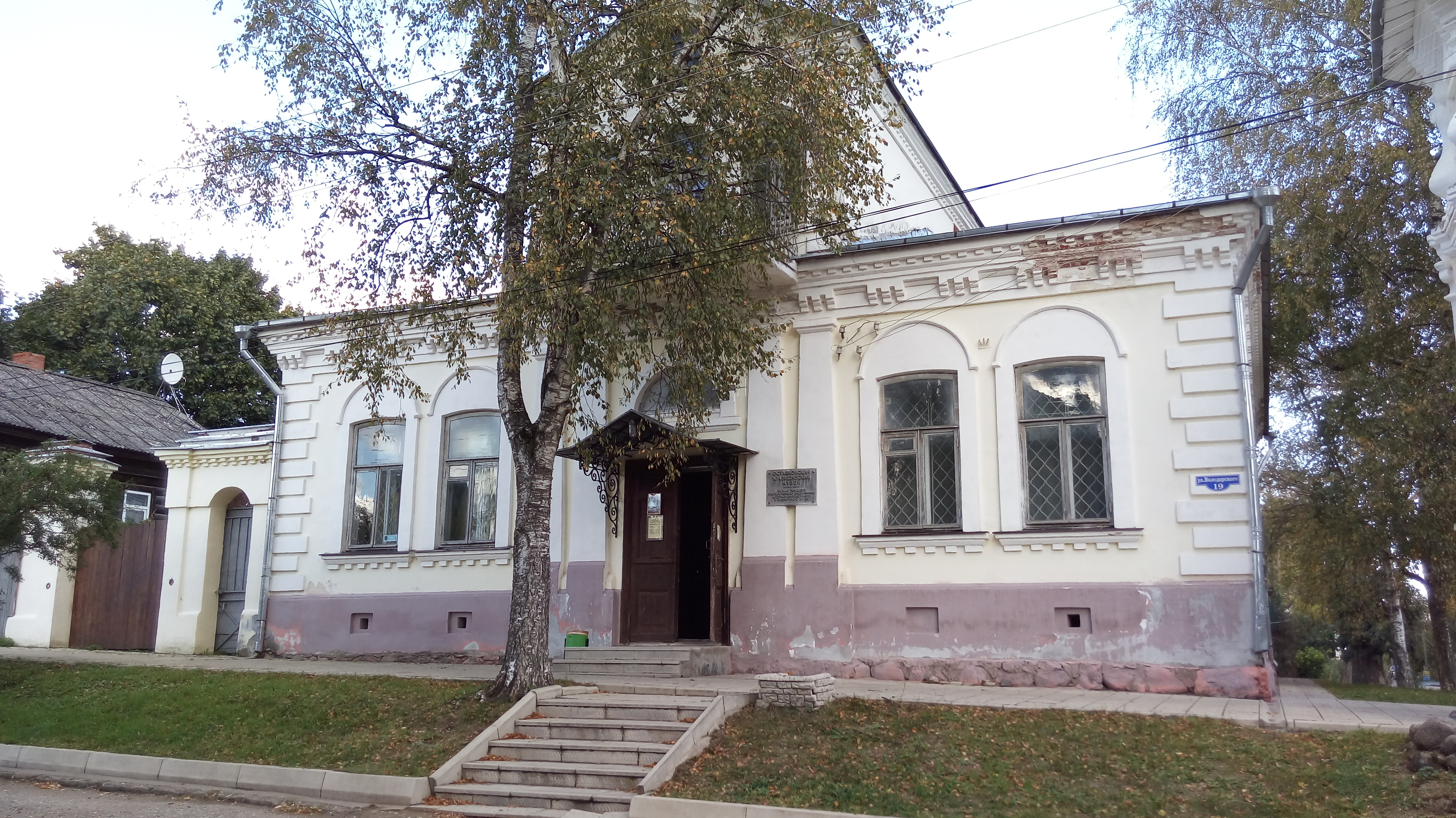
Local museum

Ostashkov contains 125 cultural heritage monuments of federal significance and additionally 118 objects classified as cultural and historical heritage of local significance. Essentially, the whole center of Ostashkov consists of listed buildings.

Ostashkovsky District Museum was founded in 1889 and is in Ostashkov. It has displays on local history and ethnography.

== Twin towns and sister cities ==
Ostashkov is twinned with:

- Maardu, Estonia
