= Kuvshinovo, Kuvshinovsky District, Tver Oblast =

Town in Tver Oblast, Russia

Kuvshinovo Кувшиново
- Town
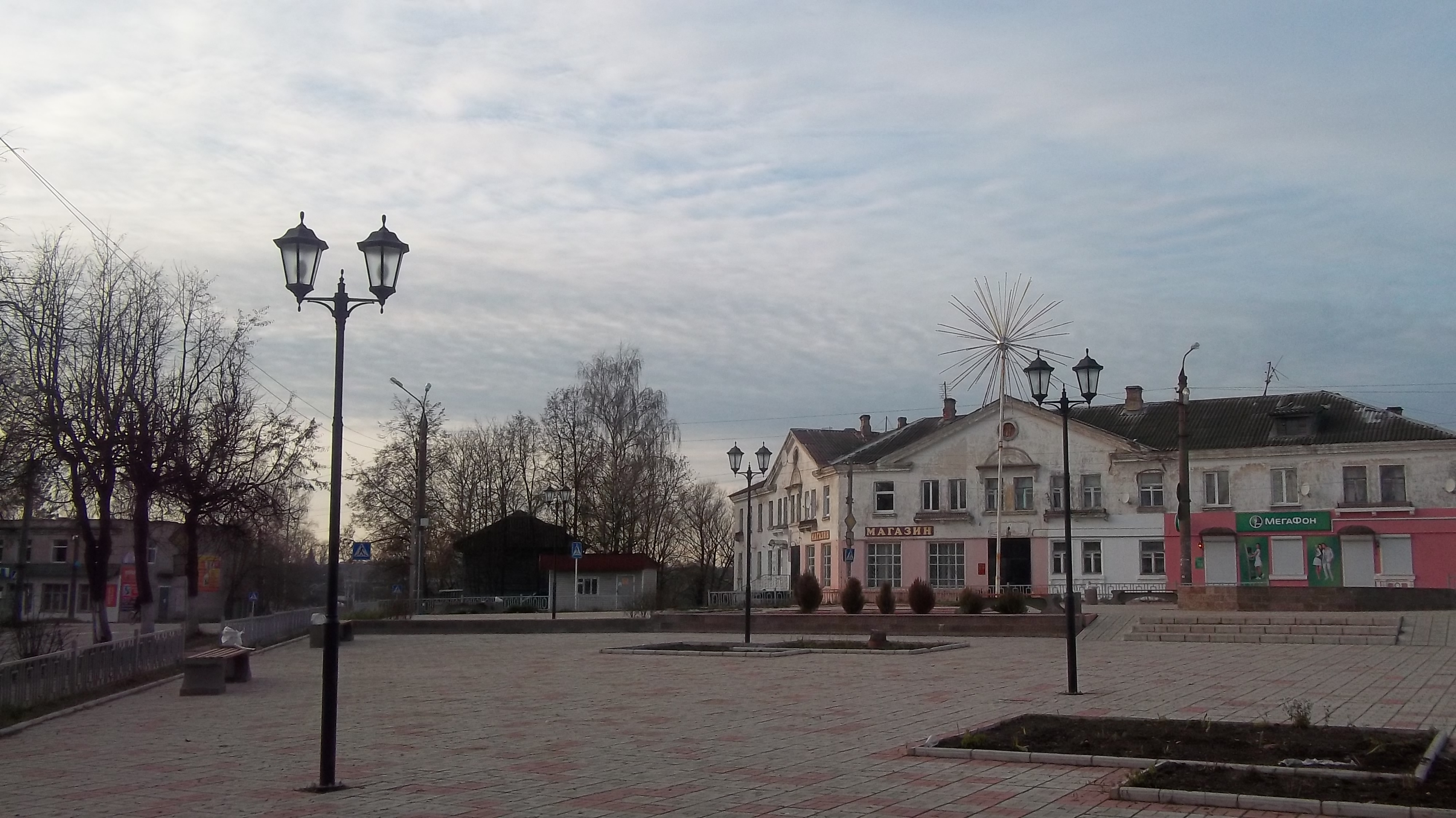
- Central square in Kuvshinovo

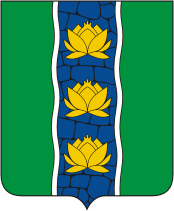
- Coat of arms
- Interactive map of Kuvshinovo
- Location of Kuvshinovo Kuvshinovo (Tver Oblast)
- Coordinates: 57°02′N 34°11′E
- Country: Russia
- Federal subject: Tver Oblast
- Administrative district: Kuvshinovsky District
- Urban settlementSelsoviet: Kuvshinovo
- Founded: 1624
- Elevation: 230 m (750 ft)

Population (2010 Census)
  - Total: 10,007
  - Estimate (2021): 9,262 (−7.4%)

Administrative status
  - Capital of: Kuvshinovsky District, Kuvshinovo Urban Settlement

Municipal status
  - Municipal district: Kuvshinovsky Municipal District
  - Urban settlement: Kuvshinovo Urban Settlement
  - Capital of: Kuvshinovsky Municipal District, Kuvshinovo Urban Settlement
- Time zone: UTC+3 (MSK)
- Postal code: 172110–172112
- OKTMO ID: 28634101001

Kuvshinovo (Russian: Кувши́ново) is a town and the administrative center of Kuvshinovsky District in Tver Oblast, Russia, located on the Osuga, 133 kilometers (83 mi) from Tver, the administrative center of the oblast. Population: 10,007 (2010 census); 11,276 (2002 census); 12,435 (1989 Soviet census).

== History ==
The selo of Kamenka (Russian: Каменка), the predecessor of Kuvshinovo, was first mentioned in 1646. In the course of the administrative reform carried out in 1708 by Peter the Great, it was included into Ingermanlandia Governorate (since 1710 known as Saint Petersburg Governorate), and in 1727 Novgorod Governorate split off. In 1775, Tver Viceroyalty was formed from the lands which previously belonged to Moscow and Novgorod Governorates, and the area was transferred to Tver Viceroyalty, which in 1796 was transformed to Tver Governorate. Kamenka belonged to Novotorzhsky Uyezd (with the center in Torzhok).

In the 18th century, a paper mill was opened close to Kamenka. In 1869, merchant Mikhail Kuvshinov bought the mill and considerably expanded it. The mill became known as the Kuvshinov Paper Mill. In 1912, a railway from Torzhok was completed, and the new station next to Kamenka was opened. The station was named Kuvshinovo, after the mill. Eventually, a settlement around the station developed, also with the name Kuvshinovo.

On 1 October 1929, governorates and uyezds were abolished, and Kamensky District with the administrative center in Kuvshinovo was established. It belonged to Rzhev Okrug of Western Oblast. On August 1, 1930, the okrugs were abolished, and the districts were subordinated directly to the oblast. On January 29, 1935 Kalinin Oblast was established, and Kamensky District was transferred to Kalinin Oblast. In 1938, the selo of Kamenka and the settlement of Kuvshinovo were merged into the town of Kuvshinovo. In February 1963, during the abortive administrative reform by Nikita Khrushchev, Novotorzhsky, Likhoslavlsky, and Kamensky Districts were merged into a new district which was called Torzhoksky District. On January 12, 1965, Kuvshinovsky District (which occupied the same area as the former Kamensky District) was re-established. In 1990, Kalinin Oblast was renamed Tver Oblast.

== Administrative and municipal status ==
Within the framework of administrative divisions, Kuvshinovo serves as the administrative center of Kuvshinovsky District. As an administrative division, it is incorporated within Kuvshinovsky District as Kuvshinovo Urban Settlement. As a municipal division, this administrative unit also has urban settlement status and is a part of Kuvshinovsky Municipal District.

== Economy ==
=== Industry ===
The main industry branch in Kuvshinovo is paper production. The Kuvshinovo Paper Mill (built in the 19th century by merchant Kuvshinov, hence the name) was producing paper until the 1990s, and then the local timber production stopped, and the mill had to switch to cardboard production.

=== Transportation ===
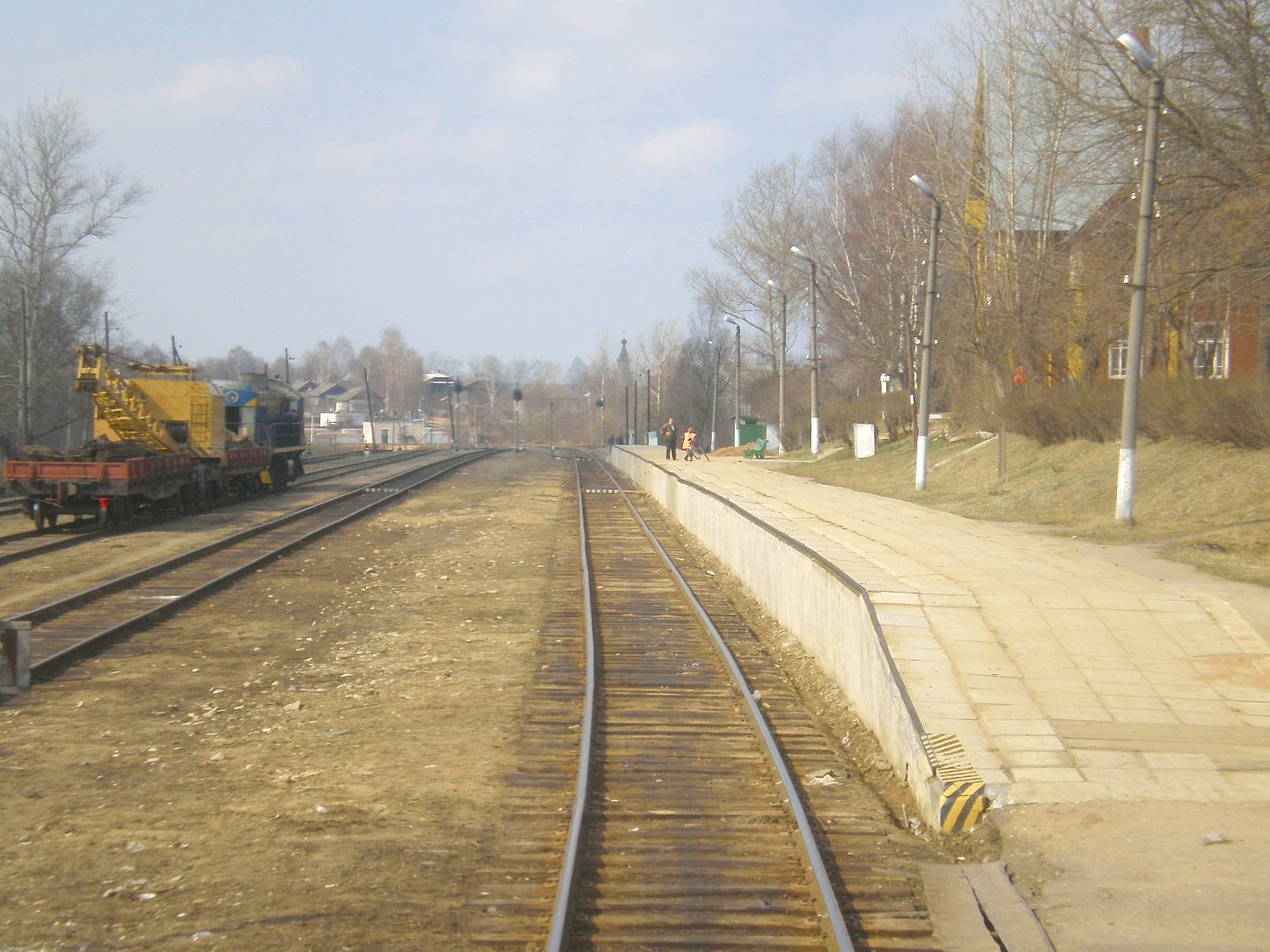
Kuvshinovo railway station

A railway line which connects Likhoslavl with Soblago via Torzhok and Selizharovo passes Kuvshinovo. It is served by infrequent passenger traffic.

A road connecting Torshok with Ostashkov runs through Kuvshinovo. Another road connects Kuvshinovo with Vyshny Volochyok via Yesenovichi. There are local roads as well, with the bus traffic originating from Kuvshinovo.

== Culture and recreation ==
Kuvshinovo has three objects classified as cultural and historical heritage of local significance. All of them are the remains of the former Kuvshinov Estate. The town has a local museum as well.
