= Ostashkovsky Uyezd =

Ostashkovsky Uyezd (Осташковский уезд) was a subdivision in the southwestern part of the Tver Governorate of the Russian Empire. Its administrative centre was Ostashkov.

== Demographics ==
At the time of the Russian Empire Census of 1897, Ostashkovsky Uyezd had a population of 130,161. Of these, 98.8% spoke Russian, 0.5% Karelian, 0.4% Estonian and 0.1% Latvian as their native language.
