= Bologoye =

Bologoye (Бологое) is the name of several inhabited localities in Russia.

Urban localities

- Bologoye, Tver Oblast, a town in Bologovsky District of Tver Oblast

Rural localities

- Bologoye, Omsk Oblast, a selo in Rozovsky Rural Okrug of Russko-Polyansky District in Omsk Oblast
- Bologoye, Pskov Oblast, a village in Novosokolnichesky District of Pskov Oblast
