= Vyshnevolotsky District =

Vyshnevolotsky District Вышневолоцкий район (Russian)
- District
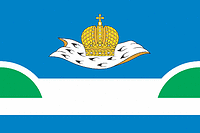
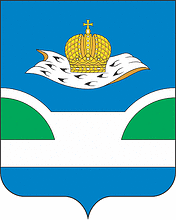
- Flag Coat of arms
- Location of Vyshnevolotsky District in Tver Oblast
- Coordinates: 57°35′N 34°34′E
- Country: Russia
- Federal subject: Tver Oblast
- Established: 12 July 1929
- Administrative center: Vyshny Volochyok

Area
  - Total: 3,400 km^{2} (1,300 sq mi)

Population (2010 Census)
  - Total: 25,421
  - Density: 7.5/km^{2} (19/sq mi)
  - Urban: 19.7%
  - Rural: 80.3%

Administrative structure
  - Administrative divisions: 14 rural settlement
  - Inhabited localities: 1 urban-type settlements, 345 rural localities

Municipal structure
  - Municipally incorporated as: Vyshnevolotsky Municipal District
  - Municipal divisions: 1 urban settlements, 14 rural settlements
- Time zone: UTC+3 (MSK)
- OKTMO ID: 28612000
- Website: http://www.v-volok.ru/

Vyshnevolotsky District (Russian: Вышневоло́цкий райо́н) is an administrative and municipal district (raion), one of the thirty-six in Tver Oblast, Russia. It is located in the north of the oblast and borders with Udomelsky District in the north, Maksatikhinsky District in the northeast, Spirovsky District in the east, Torzhoksky District in the south, Kuvshinovsky District in the southwest, Firovsky District in the west, and with Bologovsky District in the northwest. The area of the district is 3,400 square kilometers (1,300 sq mi). Its administrative center is the town of Vyshny Volochyok (which is not administratively a part of the district). Population: 25,421 (2010 Census); 28,918 (2002 census); 34,579 (1989 Soviet census).

== Geography ==
The district is located in the southern end of the Valdai Hills, on the divide separating the drainage basins of the Baltic and Caspian Seas. The rivers in the northern part of the district drain into the Msta River, a major tributary of Lake Ilmen in the basin of the Neva River and the Baltic. The Msta itself originates in the district and has its source in Lake Mstino. The principal tributaries of the Msta within the district are the Shlina, the Lonnitsa, and the Tsna. The Tsna and the Lonnitsa are technically inflows of the Vyshny Volochyok Reservoir, which has two outflows, one into Lake Mstino and the Msta, and another one into the Tvertsa River. The Tvertsa, a left tributary of the Volga River, is also the biggest river in the central part of the district. Some areas in the southwestern part of the district belong to the drainage basin of the Poved River, a right tributary of the Tvertsa. The rivers in the east of the district drain into the Volchina River, a left tributary of the Mologa, also in the Volga basin.

There are many lakes in the northern part of the district. The largest are Lake Mstino and Lake Pudoro, both located in the basin of the Msta.

== History ==
The area of the district was populated since prehistoric times, as is witnessed by a large number of archeological sites. It was located on one of the most popular waterways between Baltic and Caspian seas, which followed the Msta, the Tsna, and the Tvertsa. In the medieval time, the area was dependent on the Novgorod Republic. After Novgorod was annexed by Moscow in the 15th century, it was divided between Derevskaya and Bezhetskaya pyatinas of Novgorod lands. In the course of the administrative reform carried out in 1708 by Peter the Great, the area was included into Ingermanlandia Governorate (since 1710 known as Saint Petersburg Governorate), and in 1727 Novgorod Governorate split off. On April 2, 1772 Vyshnevolotsky Uyezd of Novgorod Governorate was established, with the seat in Vyshny Volochyok. In 1775, Tver Viceroyalty was formed from the lands which previously belonged to Moscow and Novgorod Governorates, and the area was transferred to Tver Viceroyalty, which in 1796 was transformed to Tver Governorate.

On July 12, 1929 the governorates and uyezds were abolished. Vyshnevolotsky District, with the administrative center in Vyshny Volochyok, was established within Tver Okrug of Moscow Oblast. On July 23, 1930, the okrugs were abolished, and the districts were directly subordinated to the oblast. On January 29, 1935 Kalinin Oblast was established, and Vyshnevolotsky District was transferred to Kalinin Oblast. In 1990, Kalinin Oblast was renamed Tver Oblast.

During World War II, the district was not occupied by German troops, but it was located close to the front line.

On February 13, 1963 Spirovsky and Firovsky Districts were merged into Vyshnevolotsky District. On January 12, 1965 Spirovsky District, and on April 6, 1972 Firovsky District were re-established.

Another district established on July 12, 1929 was Yesenovichsky District with the administrative center in the selo of Yesenovichi. It was a part of Tver Okrug of Moscow Oblast. In 1935, it was transferred to Kalinin Oblast. On August 22, 1958 Yesenovichsky District was abolished and split between Vyshnevolotsky, Novotorzhsky, Kamensky, and Firovsky Districts.

== Administrative and municipal status ==
Within the framework of administrative divisions, Vyshnevolotsky District is one of the thirty-six in the oblast. The town of Vyshny Volochyok serves as its administrative center, despite being incorporated separately as an okrug—an administrative unit with the status equal to that of the districts.

As a municipal division, the district is incorporated as Vyshnevolotsky Municipal District. Vyshny Volochyok Okrug is incorporated separately from the district as Vyshny Volochyok Urban Okrug.

== Economy ==
=== Industry ===
There are enterprises of timber, chemical, and glass-making industries in the district. The glass-making factory in Krasnomaysky, founded in 1859, stopped working in 2001 and was restructured in 2002. Another glass-making factory is located in the settlement of Borisovsky and was founded in 1882 by merchant Bolotin.

=== Agriculture ===
The main agricultural specializations of the district are meat and milk production. As of 2012, the district held the third position in Tver Oblast in terms of the number of pigs. Crops, potatoes, and flax were grown.

=== Transportation ===
The railroad connecting Moscow and St. Petersburg crosses the district from the southeast to the northwest. The most significant station in the district is Osechenka.

The M10 highway, which connects Moscow and St. Petersburg, crosses the district from southeast to northwest. In Vyshny Volochyok, a road connecting to Maksatikha, Bezhetsk, and Rybinsk branches out east, and in Krasnomaysky, a road connecting to Firovo branches out west. There are local roads as well, with the bus traffic originating from Vyshny Volochyok.

The Tvertsa and the Msta are connected by the Vyshny Volochyok Waterway, constructed in the 18th century to provide for a waterway connecting Moscow and Saint Petersburg, in particular, the Neva and the Volga. Currently, there is no passenger navigation.

== Culture and recreation ==
The district contains thirty cultural heritage monuments of federal significance and additionally fifty-nine objects classified as cultural and historical heritage of local significance. The federal monuments are the canals of the Vyshny Volochyok Waterway, the Afimyino Estate in the selo of Afimyino, the Borovno Estate in the selo of Borovno, as well as a number of churches, houses, and archeological sites.
