= Kuvshinovsky District =

Kuvshinovsky District Кувшиновский район
- District
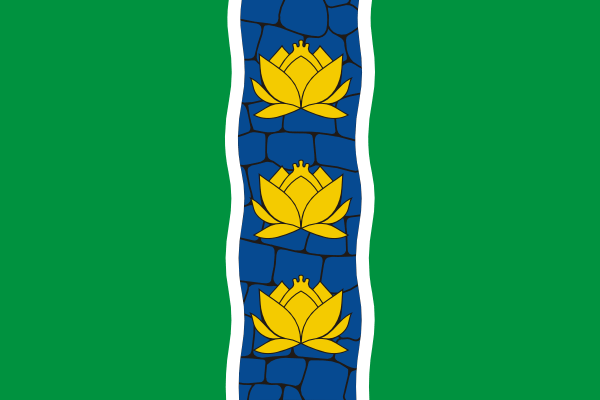
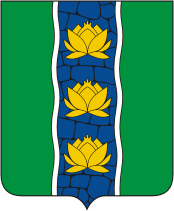
- Flag Coat of arms
- Location of Kuvshinovsky District in Tver Oblast
- Coordinates: 57°05′48″N 34°24′32″E
- Country: Russia
- Federal subject: Tver Oblast
- Established: 1 October 1929
- Administrative center: Kuvshinovo

Area
  - Total: 1,874 km^{2} (724 sq mi)

Population (2010 Census)
  - Total: 15,386
  - Density: 8.210/km^{2} (21.26/sq mi)
  - Urban: 65.0%
  - Rural: 35.0%

Administrative structure
  - Administrative divisions: 1 Urban settlements, 12 Rural settlements
  - Inhabited localities: 1 cities/towns, 165 rural localities

Municipal structure
  - Municipally incorporated as: Kuvshinovsky Municipal District
  - Municipal divisions: 1 urban settlements, 12 rural settlements
- Time zone: UTC+3 (MSK)
- OKTMO ID: 28634000
- Website: http://kuvshinovoadm.ru/

Kuvshinovsky District (Russian: Кувши́новский райо́н) is an administrative and municipal district (raion), one of the thirty-six in Tver Oblast, Russia. It is located in the center of the oblast and borders with Vyshnevolotsky District in the north, Torzhoksky District in the east, Staritsky District in the south, Selizharovsky District in the southwest, Ostashkovsky District in the west, and with Firovsky District in the northwest. The area of the district is 1,874 square kilometers (724 sq mi). Its administrative center is the town of Kuvshinovo. Population: 15,386 (2010 Census); 17,847 (2002 Census); 20,601 (1989 Soviet census). The population of Kuvshinovo accounts for 65.0% of the district's total population.

== Geography ==
Kuvshinovsky District list in the southern part of the Valdai Hills, and the divide between the drainage basins of the Atlantic Ocean and the Caspian Sea runs through the district. The northern part of the district belongs to the drainage basin of the Tsna River, a tributary of Lake Mstino in the drainage basin of the Neva and the Baltic Sea. The Tsna itself has its source the district. The rivers in the center and in the south of the district belong to the basin of the Volga. The major part of the district belongs to the basin of the Osuga River, which crosses the district from est to east. The rivers in the southern part of the district drain into the Bolshaya Kosha, which has its source in the district. The Osuga is a right tributary of the Tvertsa, a left tributary of the Volga, whereas the Bolshaya Kosha is a left tributary of the Volga. 76% of the area of the district is occupied by forest.

== History ==
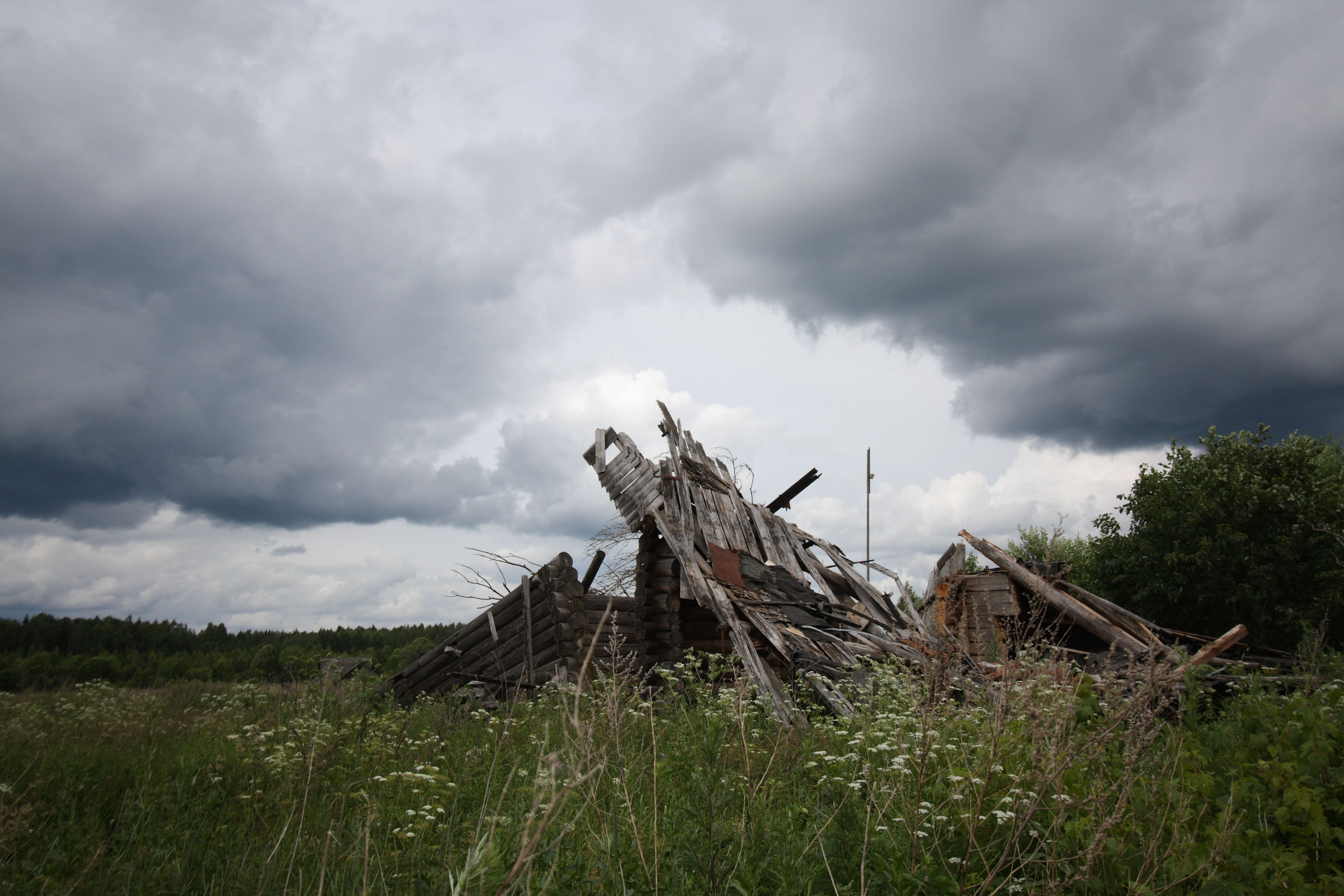
An abandoned house in the village of Pechnikovo.

In the course of the administrative reform carried out in 1708 by Peter the Great, the area was included into Ingermanlandia Governorate (since 1710 known as Saint Petersburg Governorate), and in 1727 Novgorod Governorate split off. In 1775, Tver Viceroyalty was formed from the lands which previously belonged to Moscow and Novgorod Governorates, and the area was transferred to Tver Viceroyalty, which in 1796 was transformed to Tver Governorate. The area was divided between Novotorzhsky (with the center in Torzhok) and Vyshnevolotsky (Vyshny Volochyok) uyezds.

On 1 October 1929, governorates and uyezds were abolished, and Kamensky District with the administrative center in the settlement of Kuvshinovo was established. It belonged to Rzhev Okrug of Western Oblast. On August 1, 1930 the okrugs were abolished, and the districts were subordinated directly to the oblast. On January 29, 1935 Kalinin Oblast was established, and Kamensky District was transferred to Kalinin Oblast. In 1938, Kuvshinovo was merged with the nearby selo of Kamenka and granted town status. In February 1963, during the abortive administrative reform by Nikita Khrushchev, Novotorzhsky, Likhoslavlsky, and Kamensky Districts were merged into a new district which was called Torzhoksky District. On January 12, 1965 Kuvshinovsky District (which occupied the same area as the former Kamensky District) was re-established. In 1990, Kalinin Oblast was renamed Tver Oblast.

== Economy ==
=== Industry ===
As of 2010, the paper production was responsible for 92.4% of the total industrial output of the district. Production of electrical equipment, textile, and food was also present. The Kuvshinovo Paper Mill (built in the 19th century by merchant Kuvshinov, hence the name) was producing paper until the 1990s, and then the local timber production stopped, and the mill had to switch to cardboard production.

=== Agriculture ===
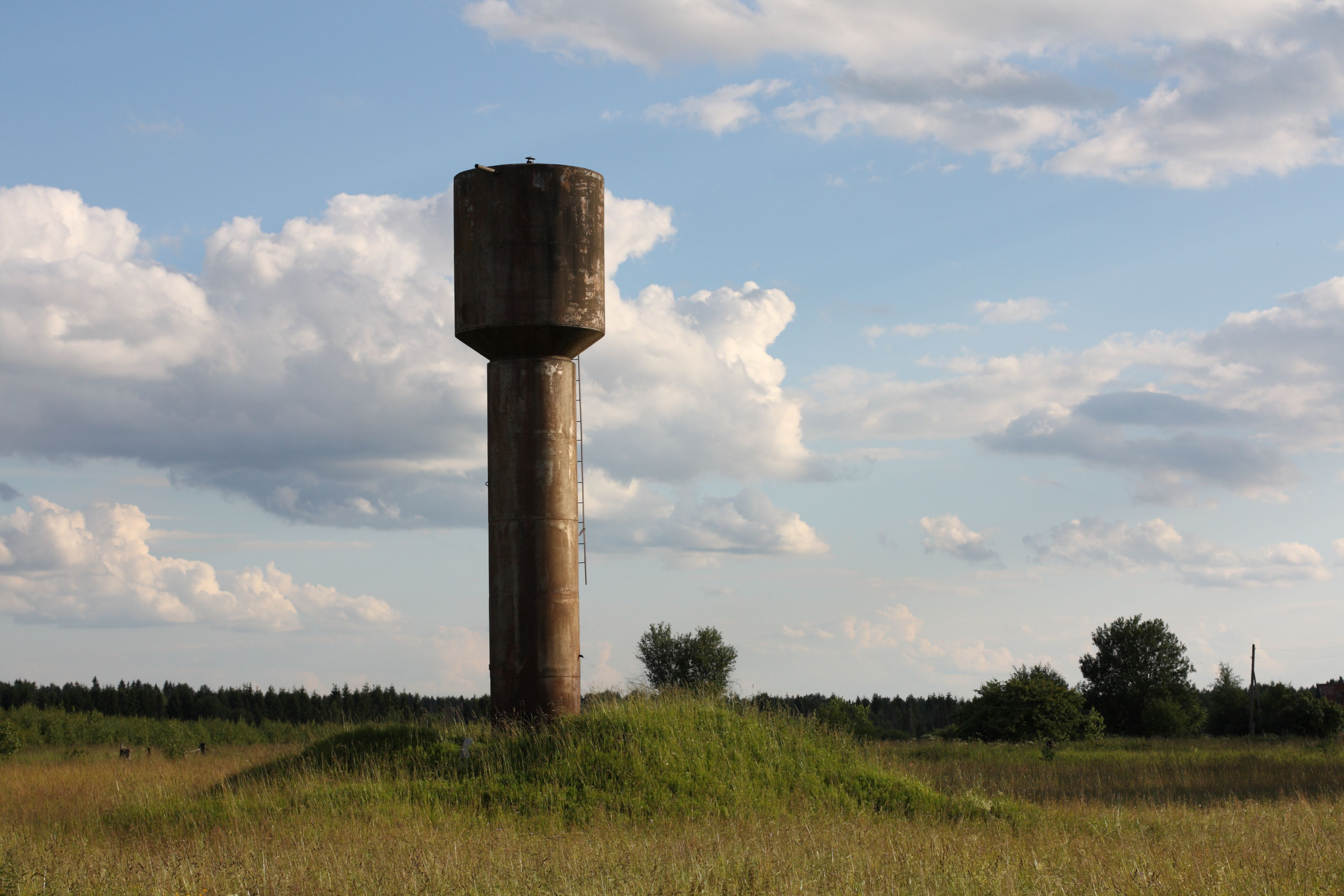
A tower in the village of Lukino

The main agricultural specializations of the district are cattle breeding with meat and milk production, as well as crops and potato growing.

=== Transportation ===
A railway line which connects Likhoslavl with Soblago via Torzhok and Selizharovo crosses the area of the district from east to west and passes Kuvshinovo. It is served by infrequent passenger traffic.

A road connecting Torshok with Ostashkov crosses the district from east to west and runs through Kuvshinovo. Another road connects Kuvshinovo with Vyshny Volochyok via Yesenovichi. There are local roads as well, with the bus traffic originating from Kuvshinovo.

== Culture and recreation ==
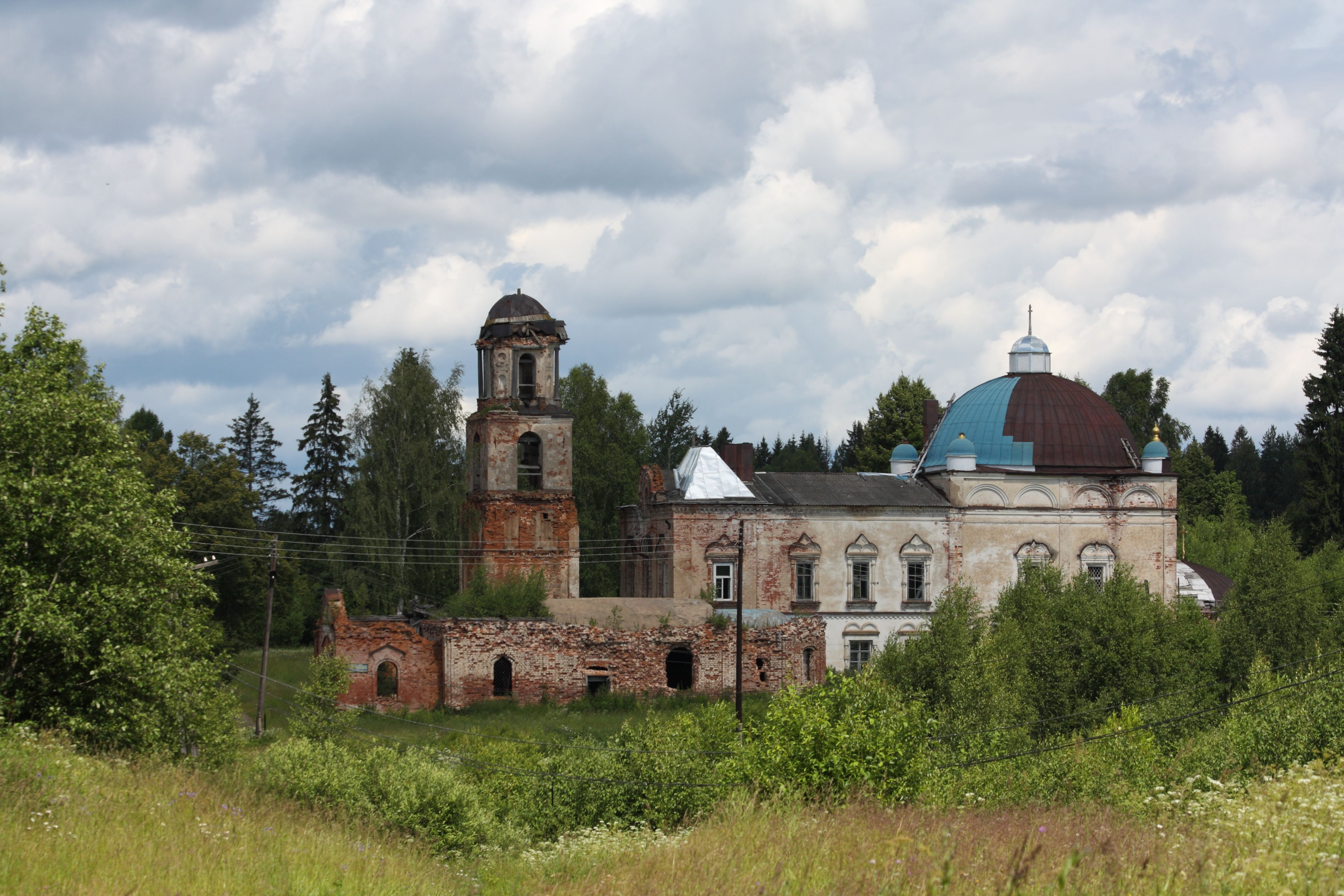
Mogilyovskaya Pustyn

The district contains forty cultural heritage monuments of federal significance and additionally twenty-nine objects (three of them in Kuvshinovo) classified as cultural and historical heritage of local significance. The federally protected monuments include the ensembles of Borok, Gornitsy, Pryamukhino, and Velemozhye Estates, of the Mogilyovskaya Pustyn monastery, as well as several churches of the 18th and the 19th centuries.

Kuvshinovo has a local museum. Pryamukhino Estate belonged to the Bakunin family. In the estate, Mikhail Bakunin was born. Currently, a museum is open in Pryamukhino.
