= Novotorzhsky Uyezd =

Novotorzhsky Uyezd Новоторжский Уезд
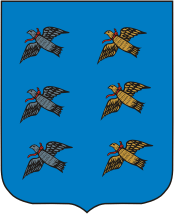
- Coat of arms

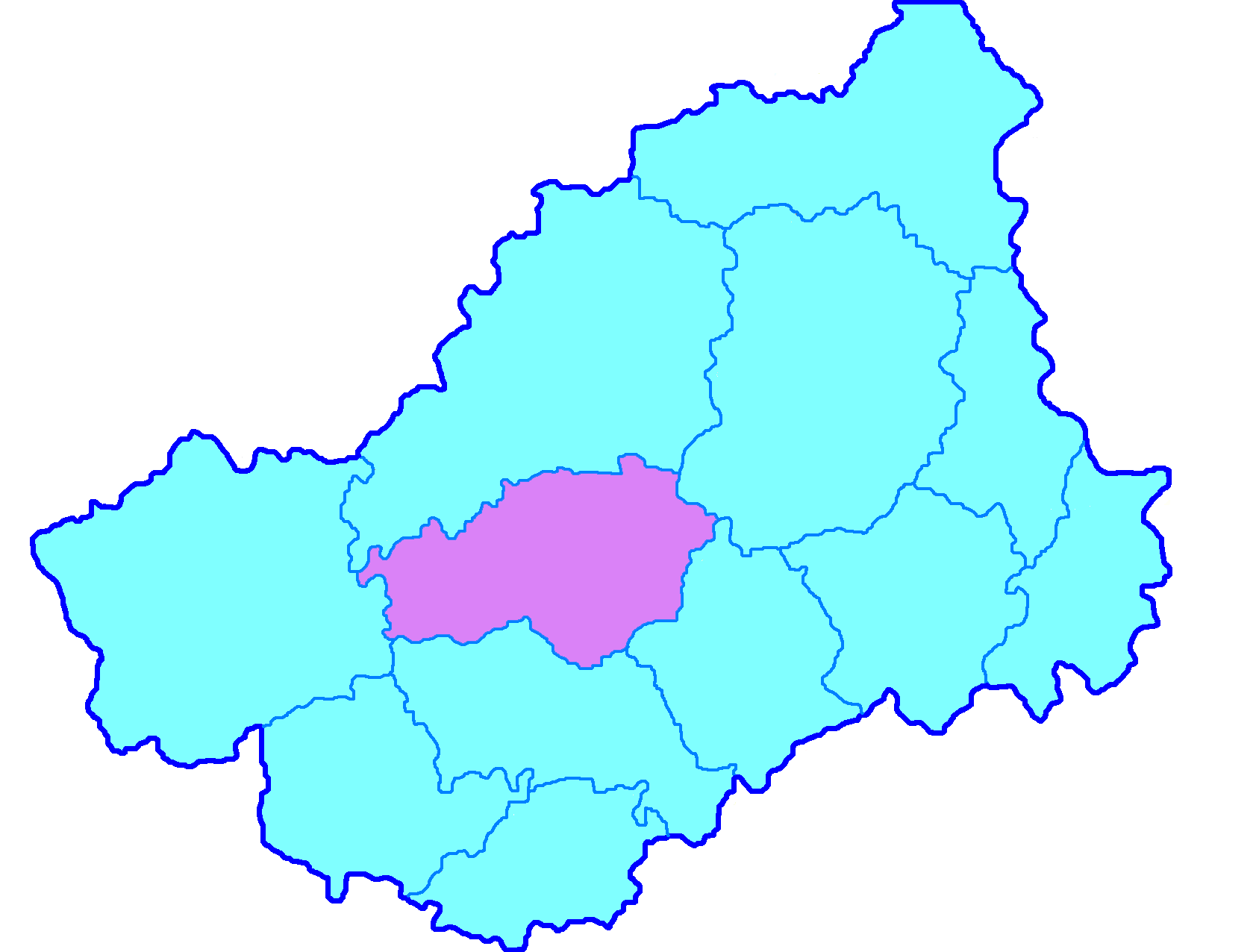
- Established: 1775
- Seat: Torzhok

Area
  - Total: 5,237.8 km^{2} (2,022.3 sq mi)

Population (1913)
  - Total: 190,000
  - Density: 36/km^{2} (94/sq mi)

Novotorzhsky Uyezd was an administrative-territorial unit (uyezd) of the Tver Governorate as part of the Russian Empire and the Russian Soviet Federative Socialist Republic. The uyezd town was Torzhok.

== Geography ==
The county was located in the central part of the Tver Governorate. The area of the uyezd was 4,602.4 square versts.

The surface of the uyezd was a flat hill, gradually descending from the northwest to the southeast. A branch of the Valdai Mountains enters the uyezd from the west, forming a marshy hill, from which the county river originates (Osuga, Big Kosh and others).

The main river – Tvertsa, crosses the uyezd for 97 versts; the following fall into Tvertsa: Osuga (125 versts) with Poved (74 versts), Logovyazh (63 versts) and others. In the northeast along the border of the uyezd is Medveditsa (15 versts), in the south – Tma (25 versts), in the west – Bolshaya Kosha (25 versts), the last three flow into the Volga outside the uyezd. Only Tvertsa is navigable, rafting along all the named rivers, excluding Logovyazh. The riverbanks are densely populated: the city of Torzhok and 39 villages, with 35 thousand inhabitants, are located along Tvertsa; in Osuga – 44 (7 thousand inhabitants), in the Poved – 20 (3 thousand inhabitants), in the Logovyazh – 23 (3 thousand inhabitants). Tsna and Bolshaya Kosha belong to the upper reaches of the uyezd and flow among the forests. There are two mills and several sawmills in Osuga. On the banks of Osugi, Poved, Logovyazh and Tma are good floodplains.

== History ==
The name of the county came from the ancient name of the city of Torzhok – Novyy Torg. Novotorzhskaya was called a city volost in the Novgorod Land. In the 15th century it was annexed to the Russian State and Novotorzhy Uyezd appeared in its composition. In 1708, the uyezd was assigned to the Ingermanland Governorate, in 1719 to the Tver Province of Saint Petersburg Governorate, in 1727 – to the Novgorod Governorate. In 1775 it became part of the Tver Viceroyalty, renamed in the governorate in 1796. After this, the borders of the uyezd did not change until March 1924, when part of the territory of the liquidated Staritsky Uyezd passed to it.

In 1929, the county was abolished, its territory became part of the Tver District of the Moscow Region.

== Administrative division ==
In 1913 there were 18 volosts in the uyezd:

- Baranya Gorskaya, the center was the village of Baranya Gora;
- Vasilyevskaya, the center was the village of Vasilyevo;
- Gruzinskaya, the center was the village of Gruziny;
- Dorskaya, the center was the village of Antsifarovo;
- Klimovskaya, the center was the village of Klimovo;
- Kuzovinskaya, the center was the village of Kuzovino;
- Maryinskaya, the center was the village of Maryino;
- Moshkovskaya, the center was the village of Moshki;
- Mednovskaya, the center was the village of Mednoye;
- Nikolskaya, the center was the village of Nikolskoye;
- Novotorzhskaya, the center was the city of Torzhok;
- Povedskaya, the center was the village of Poved;
- Prechisto-Kamenskaya, the center was the village of Prechisto-Kamenka;
- Prudovskaya, the center was the village of Veski;
- Pryamukhinskaya, the center was the village of Bolshoy Borok;
- Ramenskaya, the center was the village of Ramene;
- Sukromlinskaya, the center was the village of Sukromlya;
- Tysyatskaya, the center was the village of Tysyatskoye.

In police terms, the uyezd was divided into three camps:

- 1st camp, a flat in the village of Ostashkovo;
- 2nd camp, a flat in the city of Torzhok;
- 3rd camp, a flat in the village of Bolshoy Borok.

After 1917, the number of volosts increased to 20 in 1922, but in 1924, after the enlargement of the volosts, 10 remained.

== Famous natives ==
- Savva Chevakinsky (1709–1783) – Russian architect;
- Nikolay Lvov (1753–1804) – Russian architect, poet, translator;
- Nikanor Svechin (1772–1849) – Russian general, participant in the Napoleonic Wars;
- Mikhail Bakunin (1814–1876) – Russian thinker, anarchist;
- Vasily Syutaev (1819–1892) – the founder of religious and moral teaching;
- Sergey Tyrtov (1839–1903) – Russian vice admiral.

== Population ==
The population in 1863 was 139.7 thousand people (excluding Torzhok), in 1897 – 150,169 people, in 1913 – 190 thousand people.

Populated places, except for the city, are 1006 (of which 6 have more than 1000 inhabitants: Mednoye, Vydropuzhsk, Struzhnya, Selishche-Khvoshnya, Obodovo, Sukromlya).

At the time of the Russian Empire Census of 1897, Novotorzhsky Uyezd had a population of 146,178. Of these, 89.1% spoke Russian, 10.6% Karelian and 0.1% Yiddish as their native language.

Orthodox dominated, although among the peasants of the uyezd there are many schismatics of various interpretations, as well as Pashkovites, Suyutayevites and other sectarians. Peasants made up 98.5% of the total rural population.

== Economy ==
The main occupation of the population is agriculture, crafts are developed (including art – gold embroidery, lace), in the number of mills and the volume of grinded wheat, Novotorzhsky Uyezd occupied the first place in the Tver Governorate. After the reform of 1861, the size of peasant allotments was greatly reduced; in the second half of the 19th century, for 17% of peasants, crafts became the main source of livelihood, for most of the rest they accounted for most of the income.

Otkhodnichestvo was widespread (at the beginning of the 20th century over 38 thousand peasants went to work annually) – 2/3 of the men and about 1/2 of the women work in Saint Petersburg, the rest – on the railway, in Tver, Moscow and other places. Men go to work as rags, bricklayers, masons, laborers, cabmen, workers on the railway and in factories; women go to work mainly in personal service, in agricultural work and in factories.

== Current situation ==
Currently, the territory of Novotorzhsky Uyezd (within the borders of 1917) is part of 6 districts of the Tver Oblast:

- Torzhoksky District;
- Kuvshinovsky District;
- Vyshnevolotsky District;
- Spirovsky District;
- Likhoslavlsky District;
- Kalininsky District.
