= Tsna (Tver Oblast) =

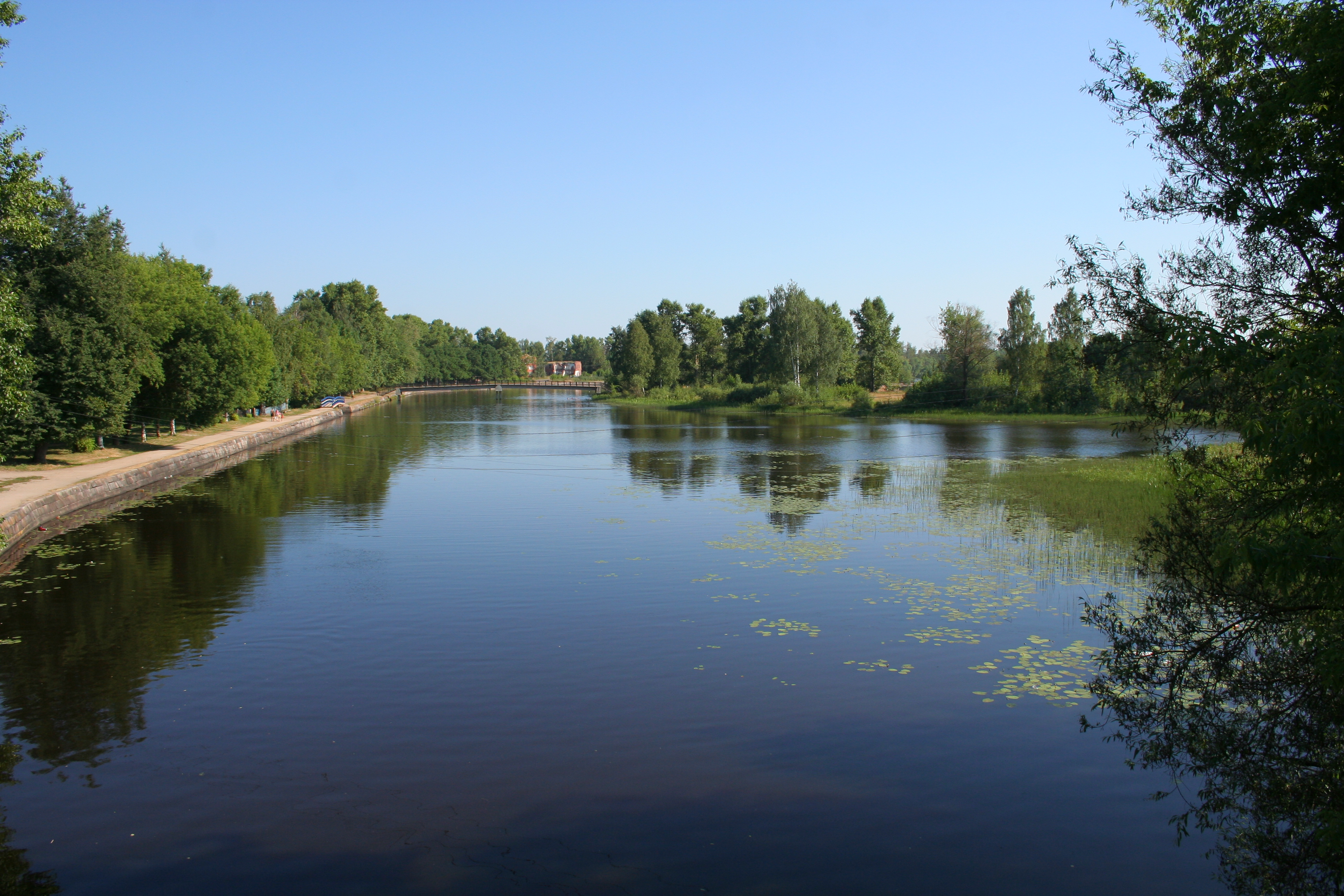

Location
- Country: Russia

Physical characteristics
- Source
  - location: Valdai Hills
- Mouth: Lake Mstino
  - coordinates: 57°37′40″N 34°31′32″E
- Length: 160 km (99 mi)
- Basin size: 4,140 km^{2} (1,600 sq mi)
- Discharge
  - average: 12 m^{3}/s (420 cu ft/s)

Basin features
- Progression: Lake Mstino→ Msta→ Lake Ilmen→ Volkhov→ Lake Ladoga→ Neva→ Gulf of Finland

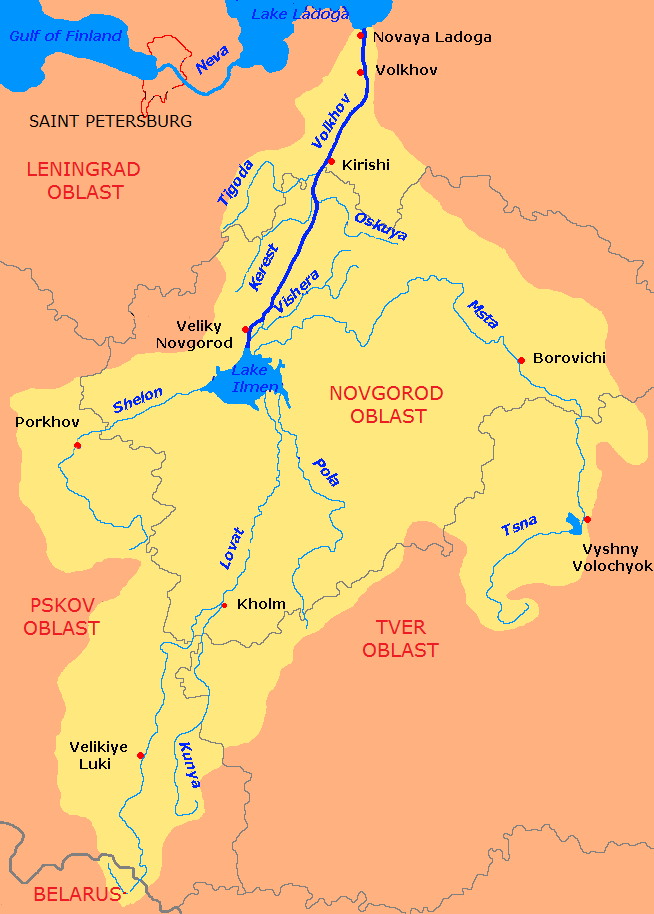
The Volkhov River drainage basin. The Tsna is shown on the map.

The Tsna (Russian: Цна) is a river in Kuvshinovsky, Ostashkovsky, Firovsky, and Vyshnevolotsky Districts of Tver Oblast, Russia. It flows into Lake Mstino, which is drained by the Msta and belongs to the drainage basin of the Neva and the Baltic Sea. It is 160 kilometres (99 mi) long, and the area of its basin is 4,140 square kilometres (1,600 sq mi). The principal tributaries of the Tsna are the Belaya (right) and the Shlina, that flows into the Vyshny Volochyok Reservoir. In 1719, the river was dammed some 10 km above its mouth, creating the Vyshny Volochyok Reservoir.

The source of the Tsna is located close to the drainage divide between Neva and Volga (Caspian Sea) drainage basins, and the Tsna used to be an important trade route in the Middle Ages. The town of Vyshny Volochyok and the urban-type settlement of Velikooktyabrsky are located on the banks of the Tsna.

The source of the Tsna is located in the Valdai Hills, in Kuvshinovsky District south of the village of Konakovo. It flows south and southeast, and in the village of Mogilyovka turns north. A stretch of the Tsna forms the border between Kuvshinovsky and Ostashkovsky Districts, and a short stretch north of the first one forms the border between Kuvshinovsky and Firovsky Districts. North of this stretch, the Tsna enters Firovsky District and gradually turns northeast. Downstream of the village of Kuznetsovo, the Tsna enters Vyshnevolotsky District. Its mouth is by the village of Nikiforovo, where the Tsna joins the Vyshny Volochyok Reservoir. The natural course of the Tsna proceeds to Lake Mstino, which is connected with the reservoir by a canal, however, currently the Vyshny Volochyok Reservoir regulates the discharge between the drainage basins of the Volga (via the Tvertsa) and the Neva (via the Msta, which flows out of Lake Mstino).

The drainage basin of the Tsna includes the western part of Vyshnevolotsky District, the southern part of Firovsky District, and the northwestern part of Kuvshinovsky District, as well as minor areas in the east of Ostashkovsky District.

Historically, the Tsna was one of the most important waterways in medieval Russia, providing a connection from the Baltic Sea basin into the Caspian Sea basin via the Tvertsa. In the beginning of the 18th century the portage located in Vyshny Volochyok was replaced by a system of canals, Vyshny Volochyok Waterway.
