= Osuga (Tvertsa) =

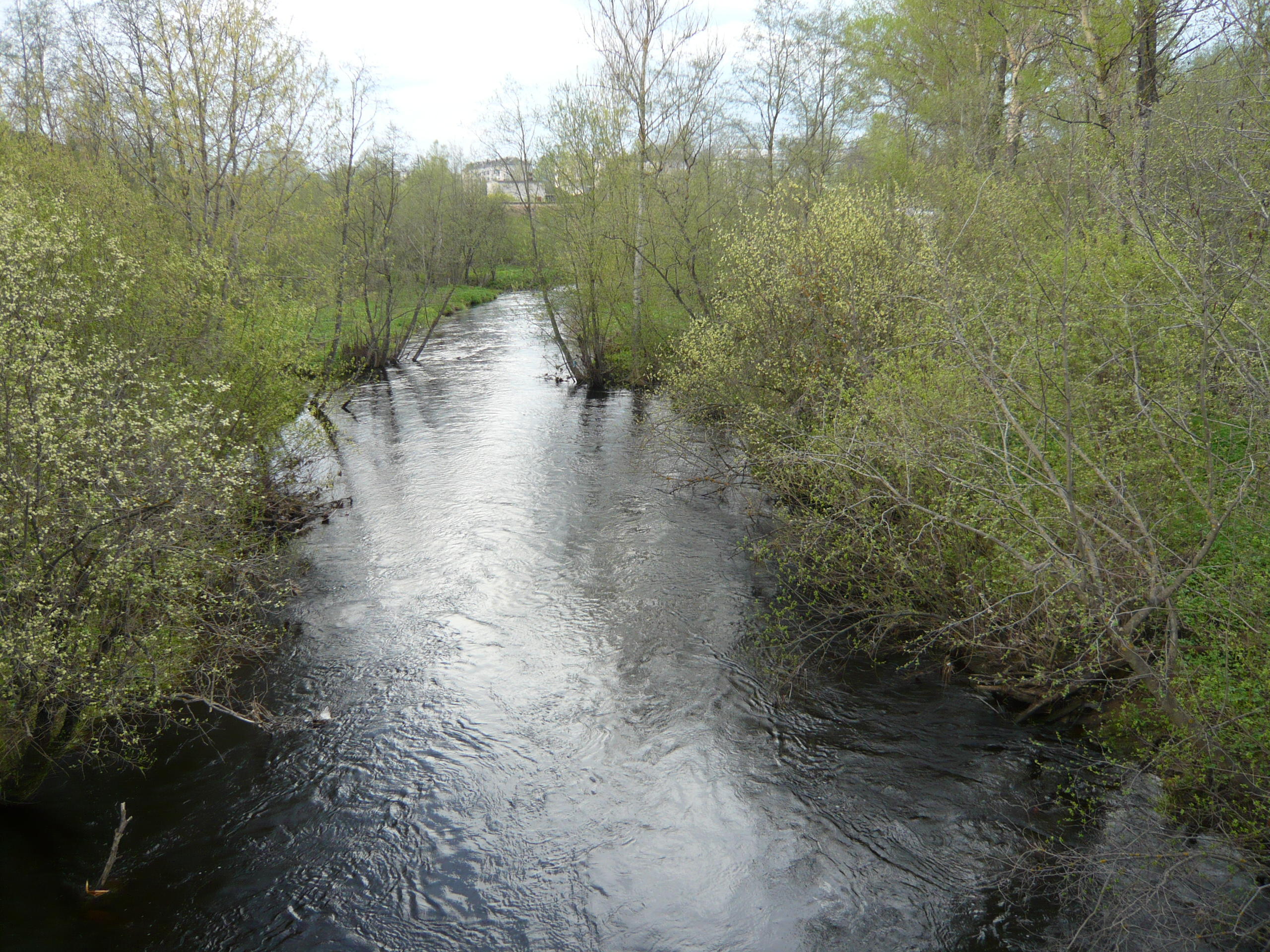
- The Osuga in Kuvshinovo

Location
- Country: Russia

Physical characteristics
- Source
  - location: Valdai Hills
- Mouth: Tvertsa
  - coordinates: 57.2675°N 34.8075°E
- Length: 167 km (104 mi)
- Basin size: 2,410 km^{2} (930 sq mi)
- Discharge
  - average: 17.9 m^{3}/s (630 cu ft/s)

Basin features
- Progression: Tvertsa→ Volga→ Caspian Sea

The Osuga (Russian: река́ Осу́га) is a river in Selizharovsky, Kuvshinovsky, Torzhoksky, and Spirovsky districts of Tver Oblast of Russia, a right tributary of the Tvertsa. The Osuga is 167 kilometres (104 mi) long, and the area of its drainage basin is 2,410 square kilometres (930 mi^{2}). The town of Kuvshinovo is along the banks of the Osuga.

The source of the Osuga is in the south-eastern part of the Valdai Hills, in the east of Selizharovsky District. The Osuga flows east, making a stretch of the border between Selizharovsky and Kuvshinovsky districts, and enters Kuvshinovsky District. In the village of Taraskovo, there is a dam, making a pond. Further downstream, the Osuga flows through the town of Kuvshinovo, turns north-east and enters Torzhoksky District. The last stretch of the Osuga flows on the border between Torzhoksky and Spirovsky districts. The mouth of the Osuga is close to the settlement of Tveretsky.

The drainage basin of the Osuga includes almost the whole Kuvshinovsky District, the northwestern part of Torzhoksky District, as well as minor areas in Spirovsky, Vyshnevolotsky, and Selizharovsky districts.
