= Kuvshinovo =

Kuvshinovo (Russian: Кувшиново) is the name of several inhabited localities in Russia.

Urban localities

- Kuvshinovo, Kuvshinovsky District, Tver Oblast, a town of district significance in Kuvshinovsky District of Tver Oblast

Rural localities

- Kuvshinovo, Bryansk Oblast, a village in Dmitrovsky Selsoviet of Pochepsky District of Bryansk Oblast
- Kuvshinovo, Yukhnovsky District, Kaluga Oblast, a village in Yukhnovsky District, Kaluga Oblast
- Kuvshinovo, Zhukovsky District, Kaluga Oblast, a village in Zhukovsky District, Kaluga Oblast
- Kuvshinovo, Kostroma Oblast, a village in Chukhlomskoye Settlement of Chukhlomsky District of Kostroma Oblast
- Kuvshinovo, Leningrad Oblast, a village in Pashskoye Settlement Municipal Formation of Volkhovsky District of Leningrad Oblast
- Kuvshinovo, Moscow Oblast, a village in Karinskoye Rural Settlement of Zaraysky District of Moscow Oblast
- Kuvshinovo, Smolensk Oblast, a village in Divasovskoye Rural Settlement of Smolensky District of Smolensk Oblast
- Kuvshinovo, Kalininsky District, Tver Oblast, a village in Mikhaylovskoye Rural Settlement of Kalininsky District of Tver Oblast
- Kuvshinovo, Rzhevsky District, Tver Oblast, a village in Chertolino Rural Settlement of Rzhevsky District of Tver Oblast
- Kuvshinovo, Sokolsky District, Vologda Oblast, a village in Chuchkovsky Selsoviet of Sokolsky District of Vologda Oblast
- Kuvshinovo, Vologodsky District, Vologda Oblast, a settlement in Semenkovsky Selsoviet of Vologodsky District of Vologda Oblast
- Kuvshinovo, Yaroslavl Oblast, a village in Rozhdestvensky Rural Okrug of Myshkinsky District of Yaroslavl Oblast
