= Torzhoksky District =

Torzhoksky District Торжокский район (Russian)
- District
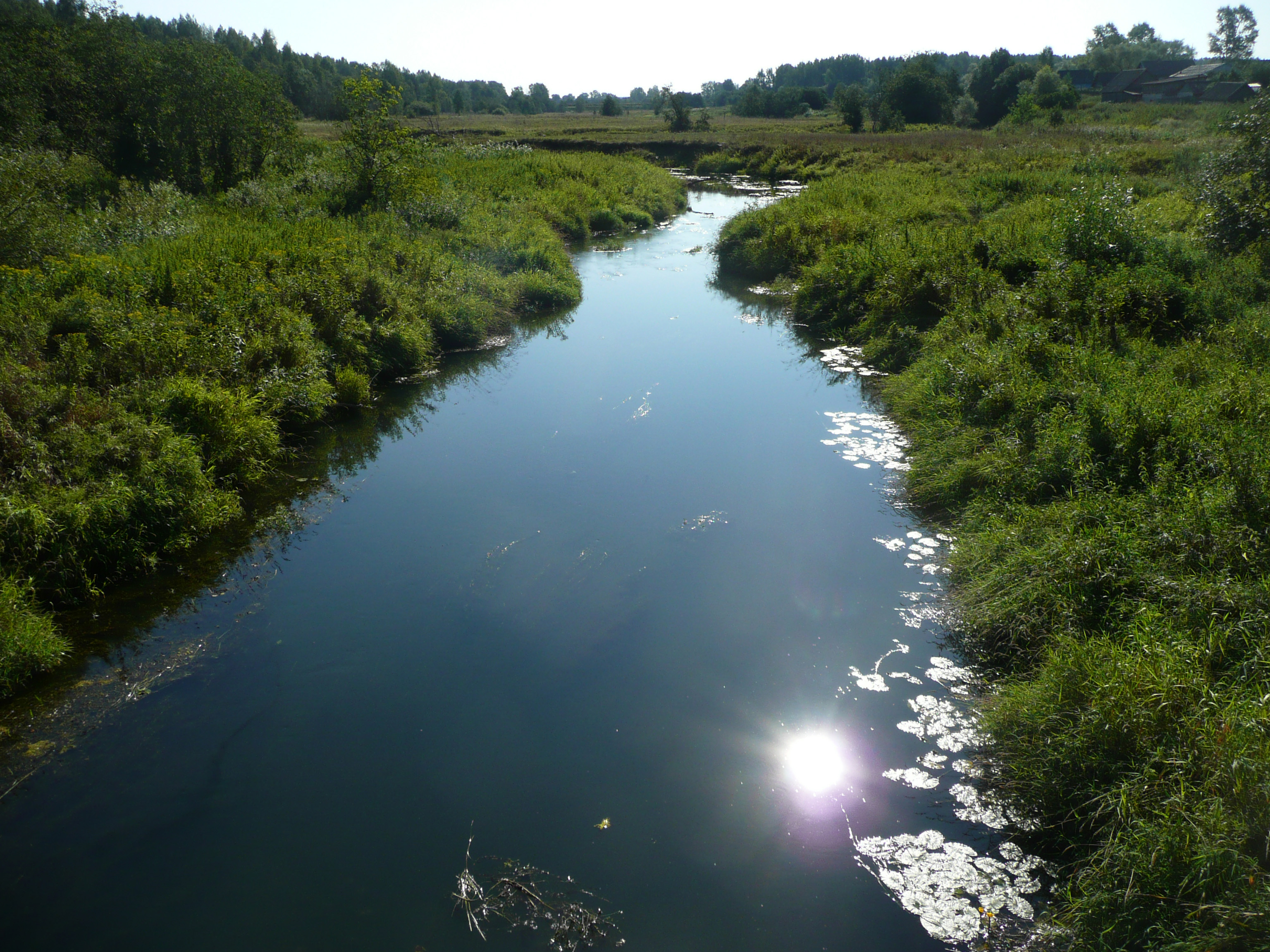
- The Rachaynya River in the village of Bulatnikovo

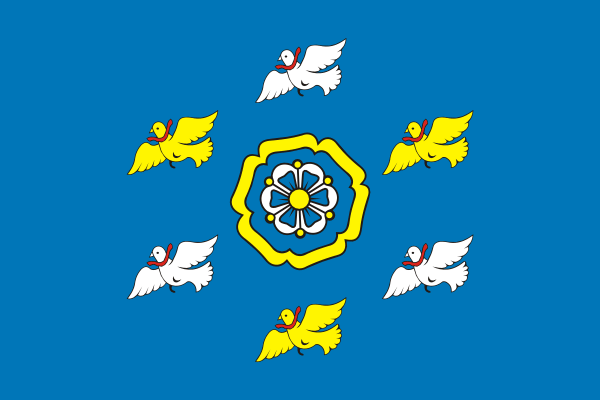
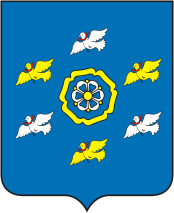
- Flag Coat of arms
- Location of Torzhoksky District in Tver Oblast
- Coordinates: 57°02′N 34°58′E
- Country: Russia
- Federal subject: Tver Oblast
- Established: 12 July 1929
- Administrative center: Torzhok

Area
  - Total: 3,128 km^{2} (1,208 sq mi)

Population (2010 Census)
  - Total: 22,534
  - Density: 7.204/km^{2} (18.66/sq mi)
  - Urban: 0%
  - Rural: 100%

Administrative structure
  - Administrative divisions: 22 rural settlement
  - Inhabited localities: 459 rural localities

Municipal structure
  - Municipally incorporated as: Torzhoksky Municipal District
  - Municipal divisions: 0 urban settlements, 22 rural settlements
- Time zone: UTC+3 (MSK)
- OKTMO ID: 28654000
- Website: http://torzhokadm.ru/

Torzhoksky District (Russian: Торжо́кский райо́н) is an administrative and municipal district (raion), one of the thirty-six in Tver Oblast, Russia. It is located in the center of the oblast and borders with Spirovsky District in the north, Likhoslavlsky District in the northeast, Kalininsky District in the east, Staritsky District in the south, Kuvshinovsky District in the west, and with Vyshnevolotsky District in the northwest. The area of the district is 3,128 square kilometers (1,208 sq mi). Its administrative center is the town of Torzhok (which is not administratively a part of the district). Population: 22,534 (2010 Census); 23,856 (2002 census); 27,376 (1989 Soviet census).

== Geography ==
The whole area of the district belongs to the drainage basin of the Volga River. A major left tributary of the Volga, the Tvertsa, crosses the district from north to south. Its biggest tributary within the district is the Osuga River (right). The rivers in the northern and the central parts of the district drain to the Tvertsa. The southern part belongs to the drainage basin of the Tma River, also a left tributary of the Volga. The Tma itself crosses the southern part of the district.

== History ==
In the course of the administrative reform carried out in 1708 by Peter the Great, the area was included into Ingermanlandia Governorate (since 1710 known as Saint Petersburg Governorate), and in 1727 Novgorod Governorate split off. In 1775, Tver Viceroyalty was formed from the lands which previously belonged to Moscow and Novgorod Governorates, and the area was transferred to Tver Viceroyalty, which in 1796 was transformed to Tver Governorate. In 1775, Novotorzhsky Uyezd was established, with the center in Torzhok. The southern part of the district belonged to Staritsky Uyezd.

On July 12, 1929, the governorates and uyezds were abolished. Novotorzhsky District, with the administrative center in Torzhok, was established within Tver Okrug of Moscow Oblast. On July 23, 1930, the okrugs were abolished, and the districts were directly subordinated to the oblast. On January 29, 1935, Kalinin Oblast was established, and Novotorzhsky District was transferred to Kalinin Oblast. In February 1963, during the abortive administrative reform by Nikita Khrushchev, Novotorzhsky, Likhoslavlsky, and Kamensky District were merged into a new district which was called Torzhoksky District. On March 4, 1964, Likhoslavlsky District, and on January 12, 1965, Kuvshinovsky District (which occupied the same area as the former Kamensky District) were re-established. Torzhoksky District retained the new name. In 1990, Kalinin Oblast was renamed Tver Oblast.

Another district established on 12 July 1929 was Yesenovichsky District with the administrative center in the selo of Yesenovichi. It was a part of Tver Okrug of Moscow Oblast. In 1935, it was transferred to Kalinin Oblast. On August 22, 1958, Yesenovichsky District was abolished and split between Vyshnevolotsky, Novotorzhsky, Kamensky, and Firovsky Districts.

On 12 July 1929, Lukovnikovsky District, with the center in the selo of Lukovnikovo, was established. It was a part of Rzhev Okrug of Western Oblast. On 29 January 1935. Lukovnikovsky District was transferred to Kalinin Oblast. On 14 November 1960 Lukovnikovsky District was abolished and split between Kirovsky, Novotorzhsky, Staritsky, and Rzhevsky Districts.

On 12 July 1929, Vysokovsky District, with the center in the settlement of Vysokoye was created as well. It was a part of Rzhev Okrug of Western Oblast. In 1930, it was abolished. On 1 June 1936, the district was re-established. On 13 February 1963 Vysokovsky District was abolished and merged into Staritsky District. Later, its northern part was transferred to Torzhoksky District.

On March 5, 1935, Mednovsky District with the center in the selo of Mednoye was established as well on the areas previously belonging to Kalininsky, Likhoslavlsky, and Novotorzhsky Districts. On July 4, 1956, it was abolished and split between Kalininsky and Novotorzhsky Districts.

== Administrative and municipal status ==
Within the framework of administrative divisions, Torzhoksky District is one of the thirty-six in the oblast. The town of Torzhok serves as its administrative center, despite being incorporated separately as an okrug—an administrative unit with the status equal to that of the districts.

As a municipal division, the district is incorporated as Torzhoksky Municipal District. Torzhok Okrug is incorporated separately from the district as Torzhok Urban Okrug.

== Economy ==
=== Agriculture ===
The main agricultural specializations of the district are cattle breeding with meat and milk production, as well as flax growing.

=== Transportation ===
A railway line which connects Likhoslavl with Soblago via Selizharovo crosses the area of the district from east to west and passes Torzhok. Another railway line branches off in Torzhok and heads south to Rzhev via Vysokoye. Both lines are served by infrequent passenger traffic.

The M10 highway, which connects Moscow and St. Petersburg, crosses the district from south to north. In Torzhok, a road to Ostashkov branches off to the west. There is also a road connecting Torzhok with Staritsa. There are local roads as well, with the bus traffic originating from Torzhok.

== Culture and recreation ==
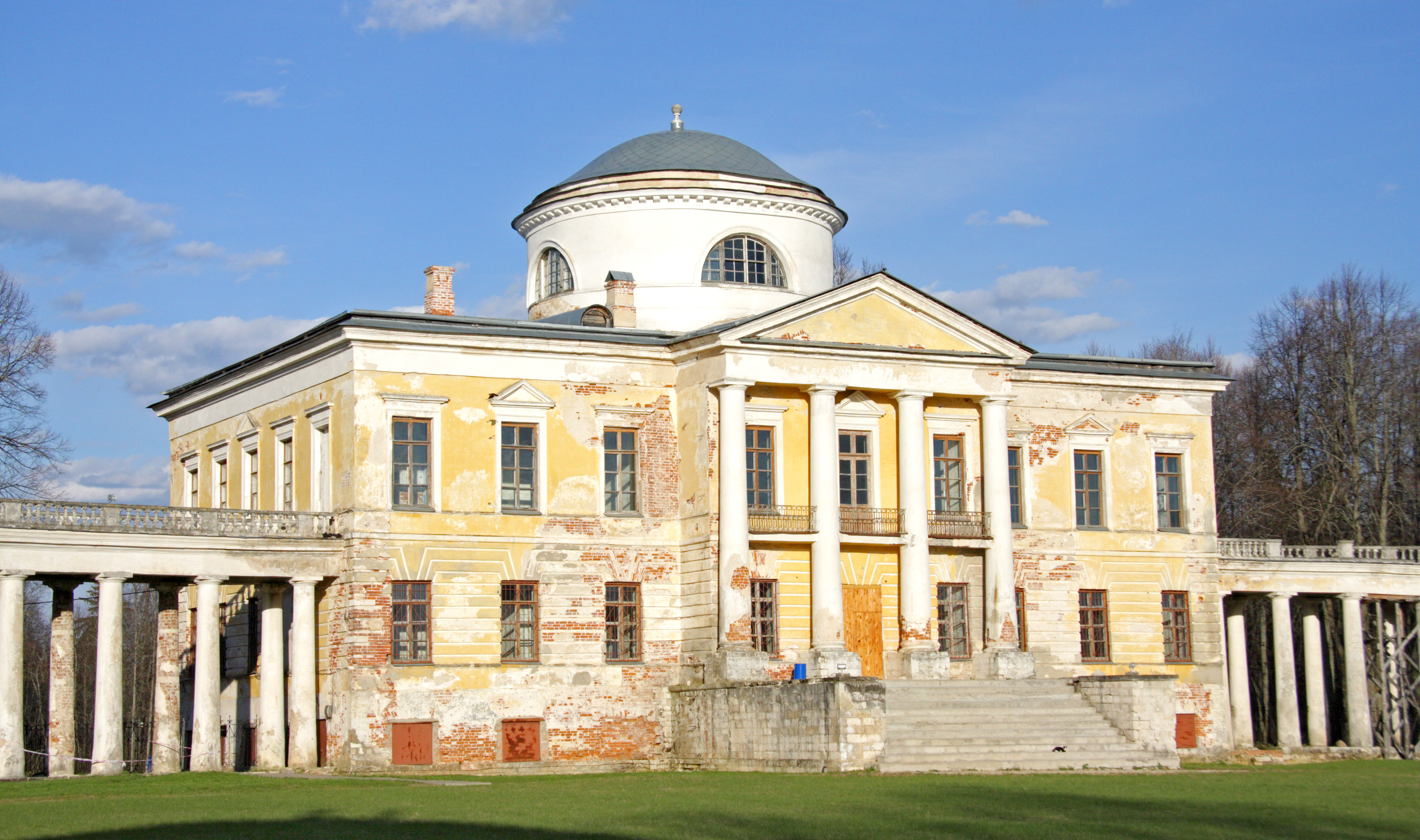
The manor house in the Znamenskoye-Rayok Estate.

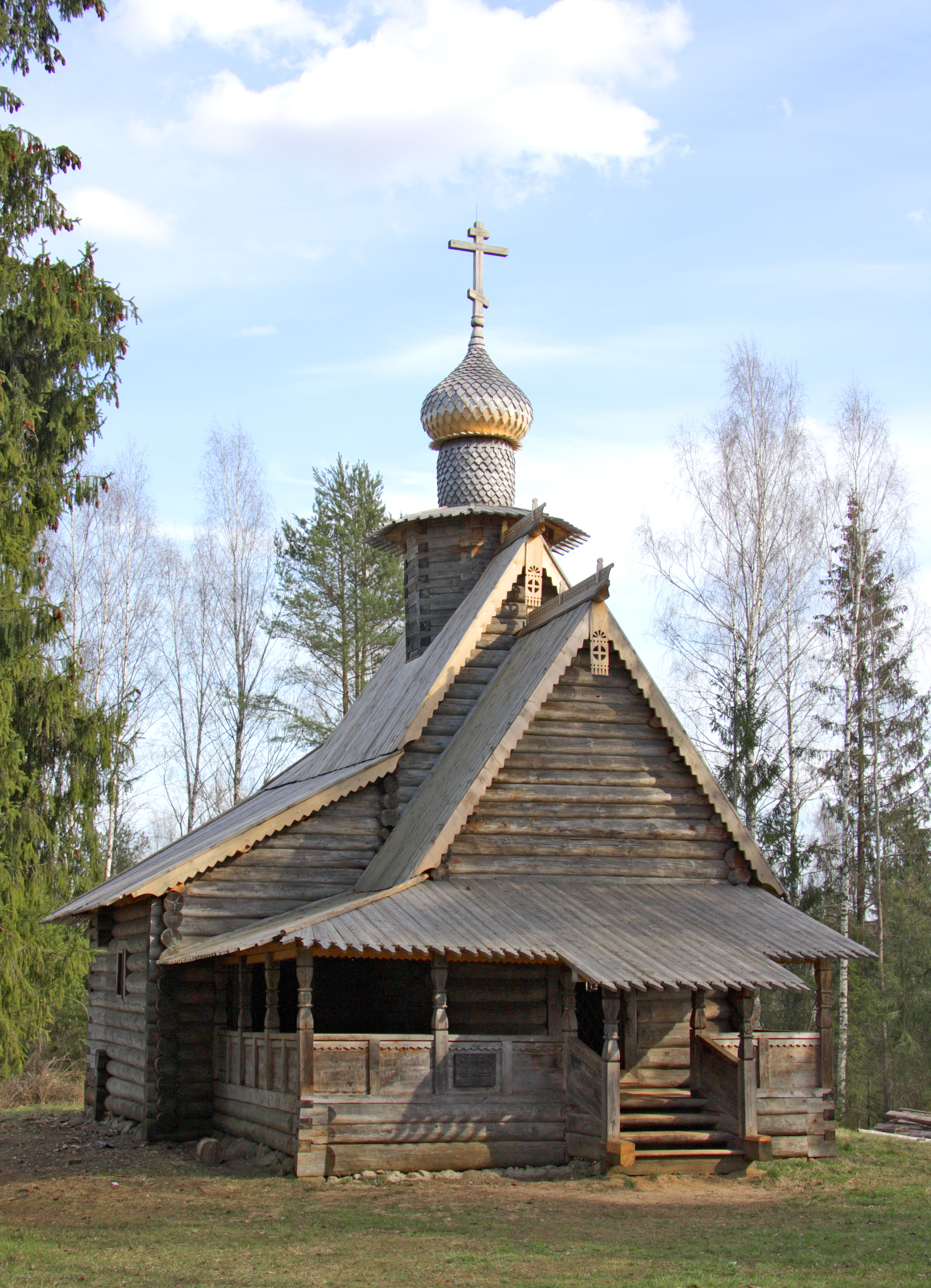
The church of the Theotokos of the Sign, Vasilyovo.

The district contains 127 cultural heritage monuments of federal significance and additionally 178 objects classified as cultural and historical heritage of local significance. Most of the federal monuments are the buildings which belong to the ensembles of country estates, including the Gruziny Estate (18th century, the main house was built by Francesco Bartolomeo Rastrelli) and the Znamenskoye-Rayok Estate (also the 18th century, architect Nikolay Lvov), as well as exhibits of the Vasilyovo Ethnographic Museum.

The ethnographic museum in Vasilyovo, just outside Torzhok, is located in the district and focuses on the wooden architecture of Tver Oblast. The museum is located in the former Lvov estate, originally built in the 18th century.
