= Torzhok =

Town in Tver Oblast, Russia

Torzhok Торжок
- Town of oblast significance
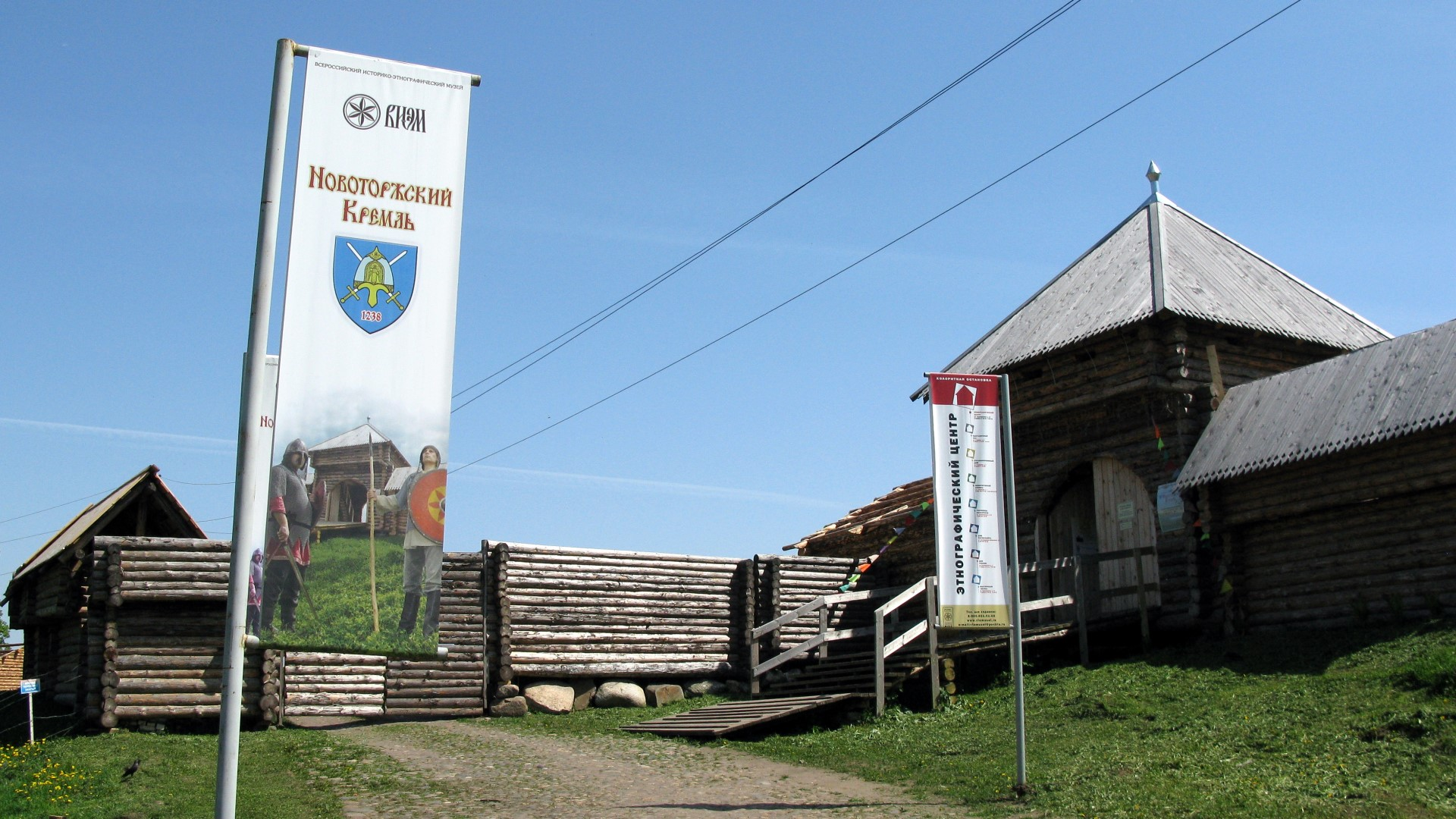
- Church of the Transfiguration St. Clement of Rome Church St. Nicholas church Reconstruction of the Novotorzhok fortress

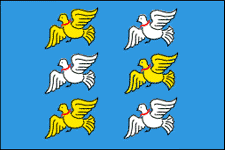
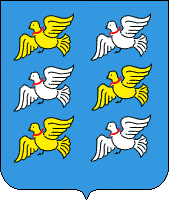
- Flag Coat of arms
- Interactive map of Torzhok
- Location of Torzhok Torzhok (European Russia) Torzhok (Russia) Torzhok (Europe)
- Coordinates: 57°02′N 34°58′E
- Country: Russia
- Federal subject: Tver Oblast
- First mentioned: 1139
- Town status since: 1775

Government
  - Mayor: Yevgeny Ignatov
- Elevation: 165 m (541 ft)

Population (2010 Census)
  - Total: 47,644
  - Estimate (2025): 39,259 (−17.6%)

Administrative status
  - Subordinated to: Torzhok Okrug
  - Capital of: Torzhoksky District, Torzhok Okrug

Municipal status
  - Urban okrug: Torzhok Urban Okrug
  - Capital of: Torzhok Urban Okrug, Torzhoksky Municipal District
- Time zone: UTC+3 (MSK)
- Postal code: 172000-172011
- Dialing code: +7 48251
- OKTMO ID: 28750000001
- Website: torzhok-adm.ru

Torzhok (Russian: Торжо́к) is a town in Tver Oblast, Russia, located on the Tvertsa River along the federal highway M10 and a branch of the Oktyabrskaya Railway division of the Russian Railways. It is situated 60 kilometres (37 mi) to the west of Tver. The town is famous for its folk craft of goldwork embroidery. Population: 41,116 (2021 census); 47,644 (2010 census); 48,967 (2002 census); 49,982 (1989 Soviet census).

Historical population
Year	Pop.	±%
1897	12,700	—
1939	29,309	+130.8%
1959	34,921	+19.1%
1970	45,443	+30.1%
1979	47,214	+3.9%
1989	49,982	+5.9%
2002	48,967	−2.0%
2010	47,644	−2.7%
2021	41,116	−13.7%
Source: Census data

== Etymology ==
The name Torzhok is derived from torg, meaning 'marketplace'. It was an important trading center on the route between Novgorod and Suzdal.

== History ==
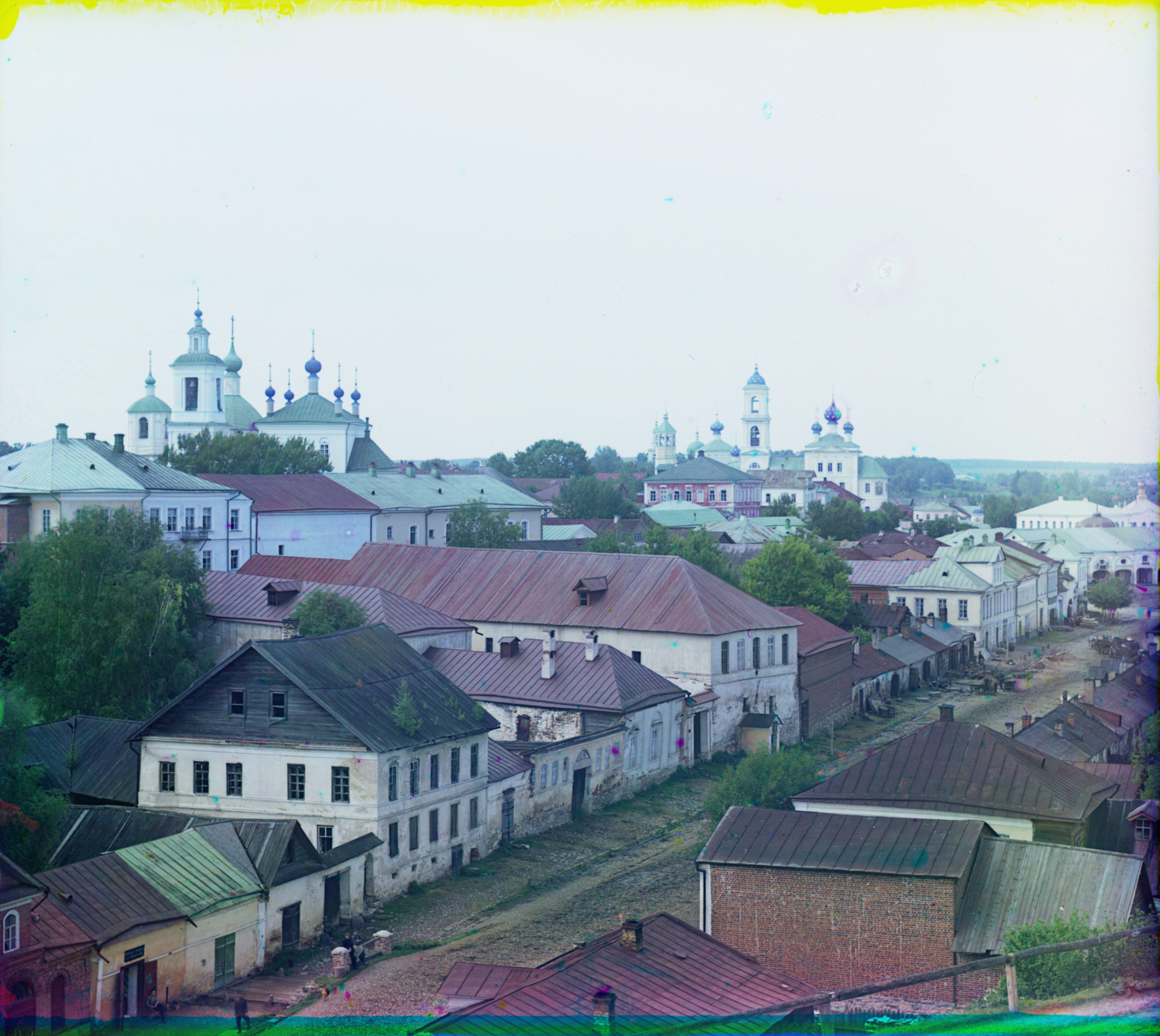
General view of the town in the 1910s

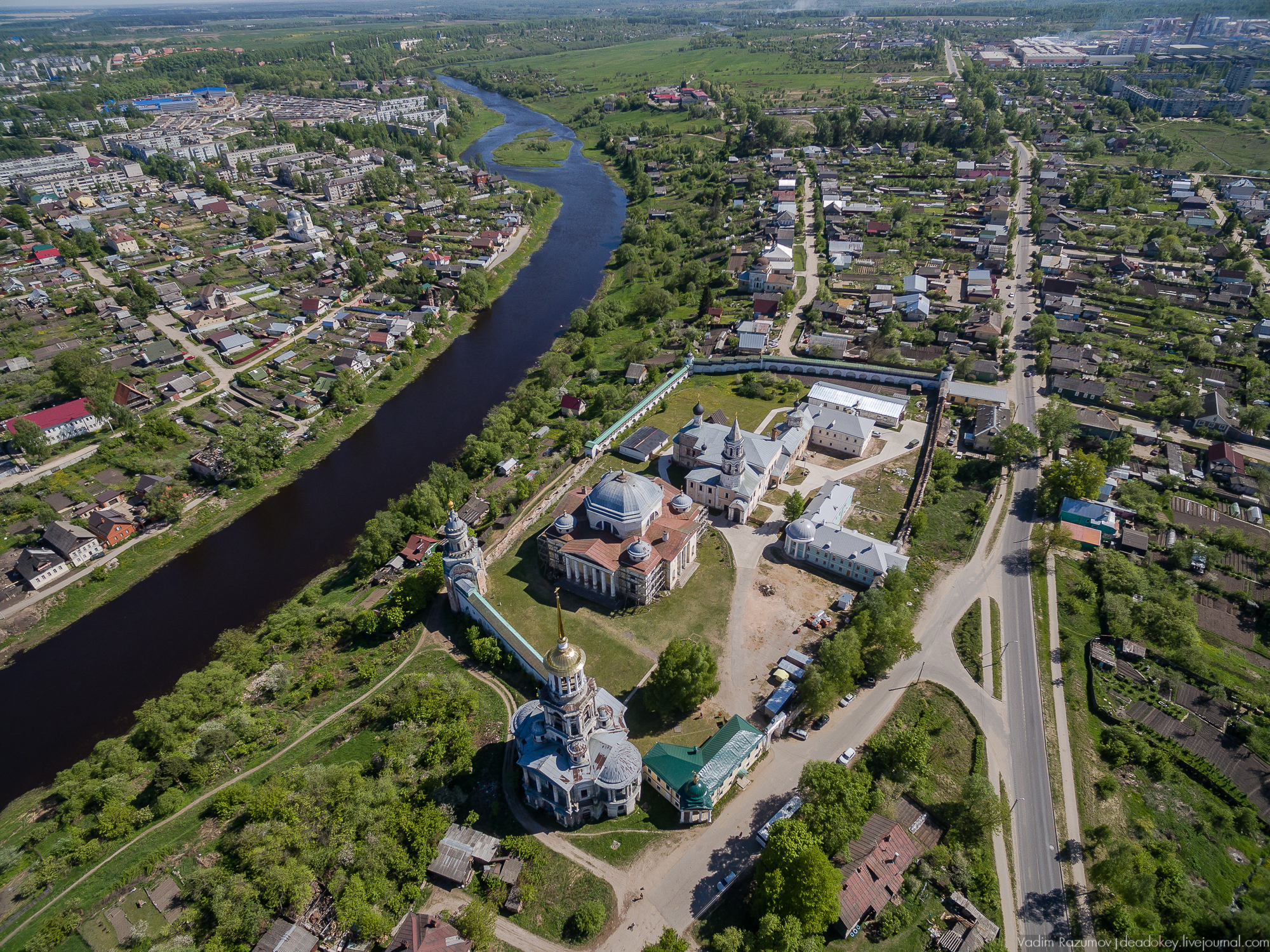
Aerial view of Torzhok

Torzhok was first mentioned in Russian chronicles in 1139 as Novy Torg. It is among the oldest towns in central Russia, and its location made it a place of active commerce. It was likely inhabited by the East Slavs by the 10th century, and the town's oldest monastery, dedicated to Boris and Gleb, was founded in 1038, although 1139 is taken as the founding date of Torzhok.

It was the southeasternmost town of the Novgorod Republic. It also served as Novgorod's main outpost near Tver. At the same time the Mongols fought the army of Vladimir-Suzdal at the battle of the Sit River in March 1238, another Mongol army besieged Torzhok, with the residents of the town eventually surrendering on 5 March. However, the Mongol army did not follow up on its success by marching to Novgorod. The Mongols left Russia in the summer, but returned the following year to continue their campaign. Although the town was destroyed, some historians have claimed that the town's resistance to the Mongols saved Novgorod itself from an attack.

At that time, the town commanded the only route whereby grain was delivered to Novgorod. By the early 13th century, 2,000 Novgorodians regularly visited Torzhok to conduct trade. Once Torzhok blocked the route, a great shortage of grain and famine in Novgorod would follow. Consequently, Torzhok was known as a key to the Novgorod Republic, and it frequently changed hands during feudal internecine wars, as the other Russian principalities, including Tver, viewed it as a target.

The town was incorporated into the Grand Principality of Moscow, along with the rest of the Novgorod Republic, in 1478. Torzhok's importance was recognized by Moscow: a kremlin (fortress) with eleven towers was built, with the walls of the kremlin lasting until the 18th century. However, Torzhok lost its commercial importance as Novgorod declined. The armies of Sigmund III of Poland frequently ravaged it during the Time of Troubles.

Following the founding of St. Petersburg in 1703, Torzhok regained its importance as it became a major shipment point. During the imperial period, Torzhok was known as an important post station on the highway from Moscow to St. Petersburg. Catherine the Great commissioned the architect Matvey Kazakov to build a palace there. Catherine's plan to transform Russian provincial life led to the construction of a new central square and market buildings in Torzhok. As a result, it became known as a modest cultural center. Alexander Pushkin, for instance, used to pass through Torzhok on a number of occasions, and there is a museum dedicated to him in the town. Other writers, including Nikolai Gogol, Alexander Radishchev, Leo Tolstoy, and Ivan Turgenev also visited the town.

In the course of the administrative reform carried out in 1708 by Peter the Great, Torzhok was included into Ingermanlandia Governorate (since 1710 known as Saint Petersburg Governorate), and in 1727, Novgorod Governorate split off. In 1775, Tver Viceroyalty was formed from the lands which previously belonged to Moscow and Novgorod Governorates, and Torzhok was transferred to Tver Viceroyalty, which in 1796 was transformed to Tver Governorate. In 1775, Novotorzhsky Uyezd was established, with the center in Torzhok, and Torzhok was granted town status.

On July 12, 1929 the governorates and uyezds were abolished. Novotorzhsky District, with the administrative center in Torzhok, was established within Tver Okrug of Moscow Oblast. On July 23, 1930, the okrugs were abolished, and the districts were directly subordinated to the oblast. On January 29, 1935 Kalinin Oblast was established, and Novotorzhsky District was transferred to Kalinin Oblast. In February 1963, during the abortive administrative reform by Nikita Khrushchev, Torzhoksky, Likhoslavlsky, and Kamensky District were merged into a new district which was called Torzhoksky District. On March 4, 1964, Likhoslavlsky District, and on January 12, 1965, Kuvshinovsky District (which occupied the same area as the former Kamensky District) were re-established. Torzhoksky District retained the new name. In 1990, Kalinin Oblast was renamed Tver Oblast.

== Administrative and municipal status ==
Within the framework of administrative divisions, Torzhok serves as the administrative center of Torzhoksky District, even though it is not a part of it. As an administrative division, it is incorporated separately as Torzhok Okrug—an administrative unit with the status equal to that of the districts. As a municipal division, Torzhok Okrug is incorporated as Torzhok Urban Okrug.

== Economy ==
Torzhok has twenty-two large and medium-sized industrial enterprises. Two of them are especially significant. JSC Pozhtekhnika and OAO Torzhok Plant Printing Inks account for 70% of all industrial output.

=== Transportation ===
A railway line which connects Likhoslavl with Soblago via Selizharovo runs through Torzhok. Another railway line branches off in Torzhok and heads south to Rzhev via Vysokoye. Both lines are served by infrequent passenger traffic.

The M10 highway, which connects Moscow and St. Petersburg, passes close to Torzhok. A road to Ostashkov branches off to the west. There is also a road connecting Torzhok with Staritsa. There are local roads as well, with the bus traffic originating from Torzhok.

== Architecture ==
Architectural monuments of Torzhok include a number of parish churches, dating back to the late 17th or early 18th centuries. Under Catherine the Great, the old monastery of Sts. Boris and Gleb was redesigned in Neoclassical style by a local landowner, Prince Lvov. The main city church is the Savior-Transfiguration Cathedral, founded in 1374. The current edifice was consecrated in 1822. There is also Catherine the Great's diminutive travel palace.

== UNESCO World Heritage Site Nomination proposal ==
In 2020, a project was presented in the nomination "Historical Center of Torzhok and Estate Architecture of Nikolay Lvov". Its first public discussion took place at a round table organized at the All-Russian Historical and Ethnographic Museum (Torzhok).The nomination project was approved by the leading experts in the field of architectural heritage who participated in the Round Table: Dmitry Shvidkovsky (President of the Academy of Architecture and Construction, Rector of Moscow Architectural Institute), Andrey Batalov, Mikhail Milchik, Konstantin Mikhaylov.

The project provides for the creation of a serial nomination, like the one that unites the main buildings of Andrea Palladio, Nikolai Lvov's creative landmark - "Vicenza and the Palladian Villas of Veneto". In addition to the main classicistic buildings of Torzhok, its general layout and architectural and landscape unity, the nomination was proposed to include buildings in the estates Znamenskoye-Raek, Pryamukhino, Pereslegino, Nikolskoye, Vasilevo.

== Military ==
Torzhok air base located near the town which has in residence the 344th Center for Combat Employment and Retraining of Personnel of Army Aviation. The center operates the "Golden Eagles" combat helicopter aerobatic team. The 696th Regiment tests all current models and modifications of Russian military helicopters. The center uses Ka-50, Mi-8, Mi-24, Mi-26, and Mil Mi-28Н helicopters for training purposes.

In 2002 the center consisted of the:

- 696th Research-Instructor Helicopter Regiment (Troop Transport Helicopters) (Torzhok, Tver Oblast)
- 92nd Research-Instructor Helicopter Squadron (Sokol, Vladimir Oblast)
- 118th independent Helicopter Squadron (Chebenki, Orenburg Oblast) (though on 1.12.07 absorbed by the 4215th Aircraft Reserve Base)
- 2881st Helicopter Reserve Base (Totskoye-2, Orenburg Oblast)
- Kushalino test range (from 2005) (Military Unit: 15478)

== Notable people ==
- Mikhail Bakunin (1814–1876), revolutionary anarchist
- Alexej von Jawlensky, painter
- Solomon Shereshevsky, mnemonist
- Aleksandr Voskresensky (1809–1880), chemist

== Twin towns – sister cities ==
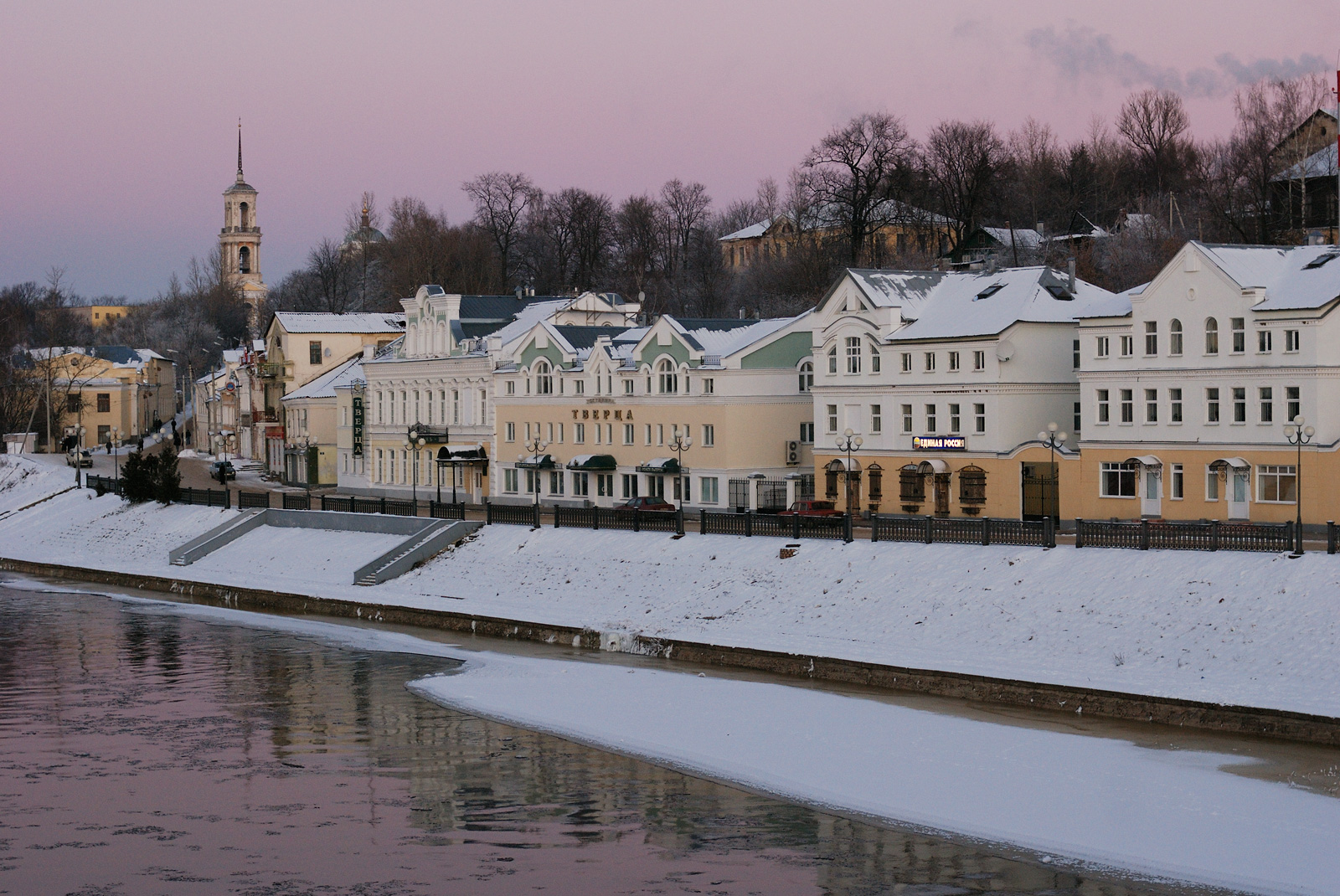
Tvertsa Embankment

Torzhok is twinned with:

- Melle, Germany
- Savonlinna, Finland
- Slonim, Belarus
