= Msta =

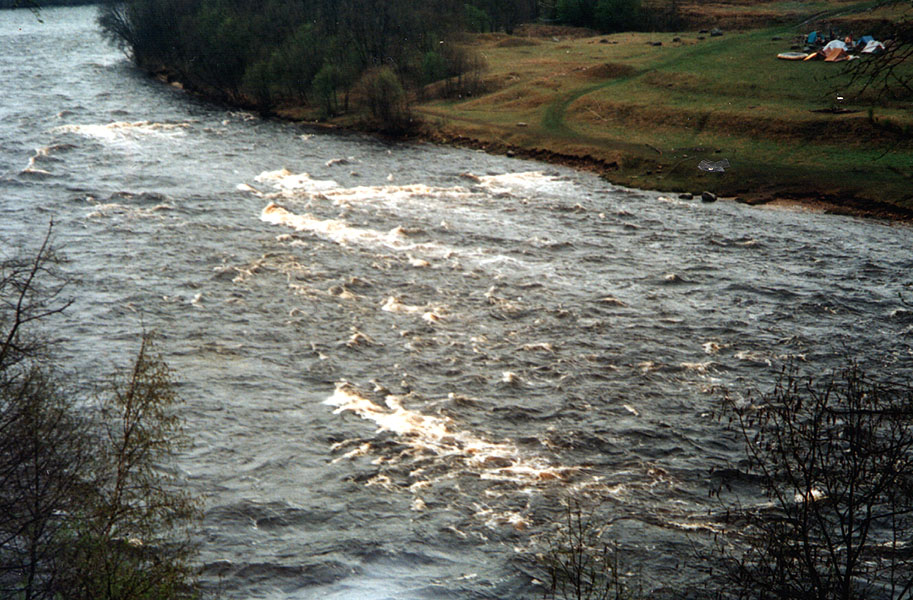
- Rapids of the Msta
- Native name: Мста (Russian)

Location
- Country: Russia

Physical characteristics
- Source
  - location: Lake Mstino
  - elevation: 150 m (490 ft)
- Mouth: Lake Ilmen
  - coordinates: 58°24′56″N 31°20′18″E
  - elevation: 18 m (59 ft)
- Length: 445 km (277 mi)
- Basin size: 23,300 km^{2} (9,000 sq mi)
- Discharge
  - average: 202 m^{3}/s (7,100 cu ft/s)

Basin features
- Progression: Lake Ilmen→ Volkhov→ Lake Ladoga→ Neva→ Gulf of Finland

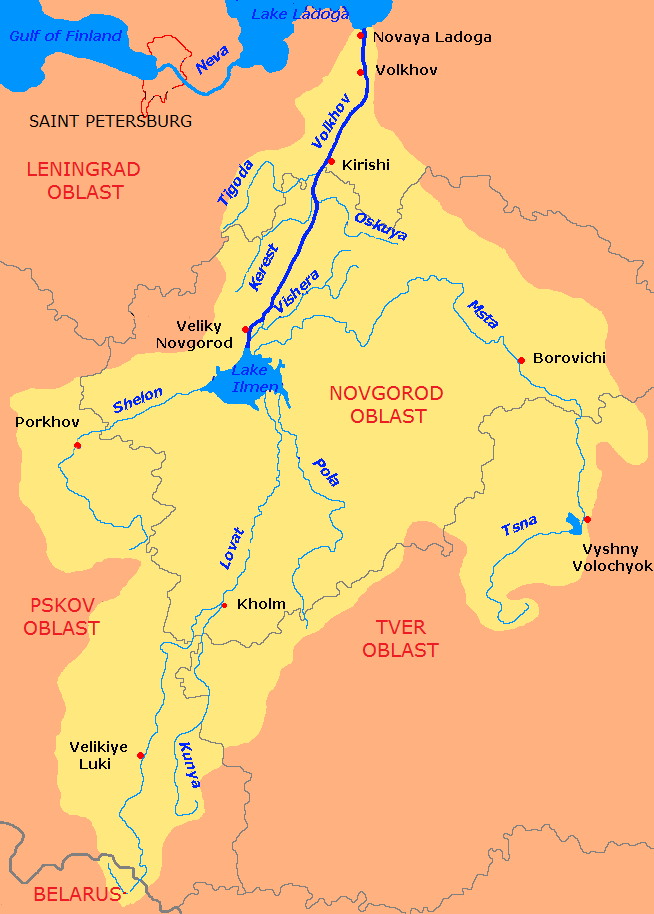
The Volkhov River drainage basin. The Msta is shown on the map.

The Msta (Russian: Мста) is a river in Tver and Novgorod Oblasts of northwestern Russia, a tributary of Lake Ilmen. It is 445 kilometres (277 mi) long, and the area of its basin is 23,300 square kilometres (9,000 sq mi). The principal tributaries of the Msta are the Berezayka (left), the Uver (right), the Peretna (left), and the Kholova (left). The town of Borovichi and the urban-type settlement of Lyubytino are located on the banks of the Msta.

The source of the Msta is in Lake Mstino in the Valdai Hills immediately north of the town of Vyshny Volochyok. The river flows north, accepts the Berezayka from the left, and enters Novgorod Oblast. There, it accepts the Uver from the right and turns northwest. Downstream from the town of Borovichi, it forms the border between Borovichsky and Okulovsky Districts, and further downstream between Okulovsky and Lyubytinsky districts. It departs from the border to the north, and downstream of the settlement of Lyubytino sharply turns southwest. It makes one more curve at the border with Krestetsky District and has its mouth downstream of the settlement of Proletariy.

The river basin of the Msta is vast and comprises the eastern part of Novgorod Oblast and the areas in the northern part of Tver Oblast. The towns of Borovichi, Bologoye, Udomlya, Okulovka, and Valday lie in the river basin of the Msta.

Up to the mid-19th century, Msta, which belongs to the river basin of the Neva, had been a part of an important water trade route connecting the Baltic and Caspian seas due to the very short distance between the Tsna, then a tributary of Lake Mstino, and the Tvertsa, a left tributary of the Volga. The portage between these lakes existed from the Middle Ages. In the beginning of the 18th century, Vyshny Volochyok Waterway was constructed, connecting the Msta and the Tvertsa. By the middle of the 19th century, after opening of the Volga–Baltic Waterway and the Moscow – Saint Petersburg Railway, the significance of the Msta as a transport route has decreased.

It is also notable for the rapids in a 30-kilometre (19 mi) section between Opechensky Posad and Borovichi, and is a popular rafting route.

The lowest 134 kilometres (83 mi) of the Msta, downstream of the selo of Mstinsky Most, are listed as navigable in the State Water Register of Russia.
