= Vyshny Volochyok Waterway =

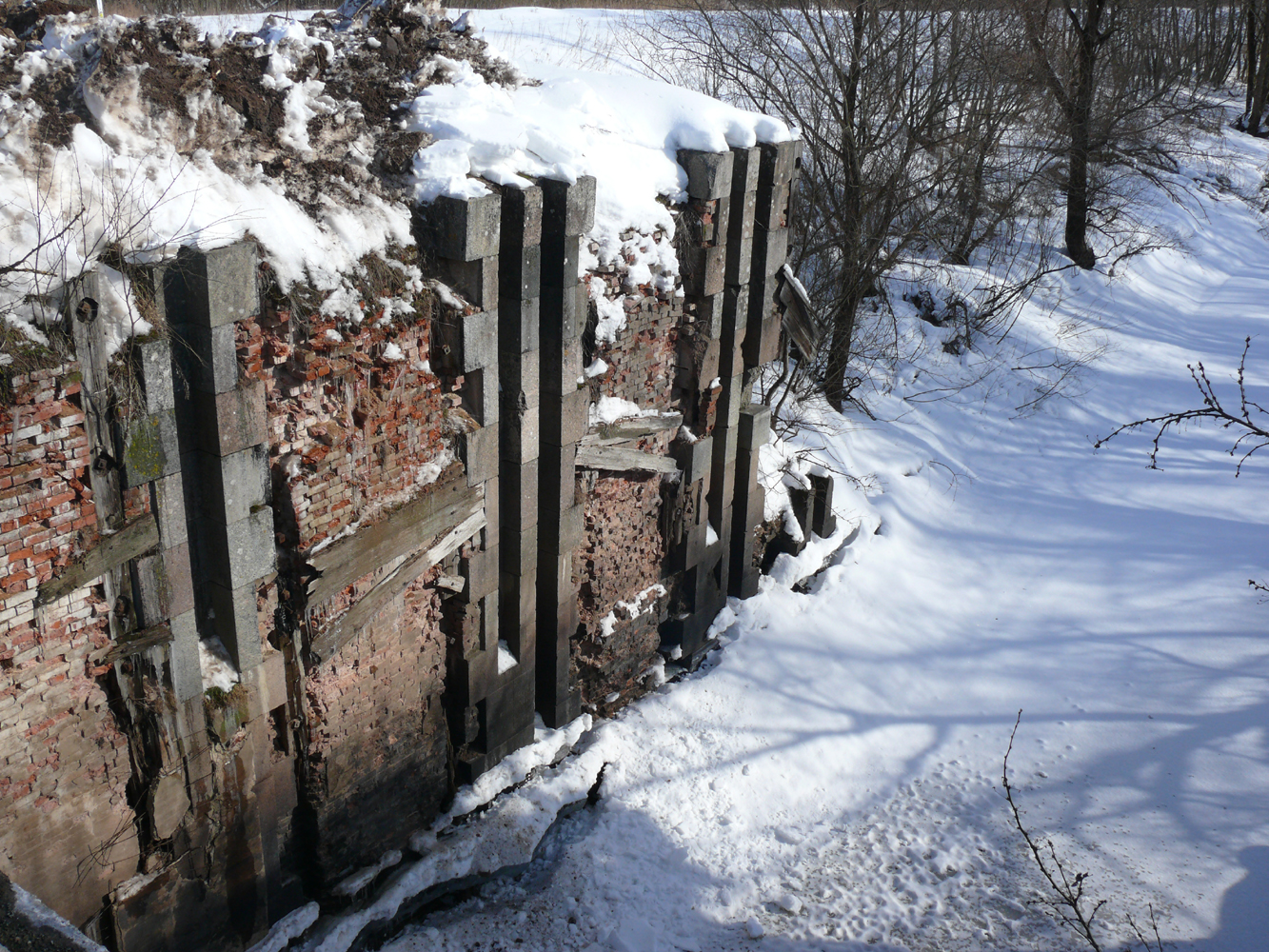
- Vyshny Volochyok Waterway during winter
- Interactive map of Vyshny Volochyok Waterway
- Country: Russia

Specifications
- Status: open

Geography
- Start point: Tvertsa River
- End point: Msta River
- Beginning coordinates: 56°51′48″N 35°55′14″E
- Ending coordinates: 58°29′33″N 31°17′46″E

Vyshny Volochyok Waterway (Russian: Вышневолоцкая водная система) is a waterway connecting the basins of the Baltic and Caspian Seas, or, more specifically, the Msta River and the Tvertsa River, around the town of Vyshny Volochyok of Tver Oblast, Russia. It was constructed in the 1700s and became the first waterway to connect the basins of the two seas. The waterway is still in operation, though it was superseded by the Volga–Baltic Waterway and cannot take big ships. The Vyshny Volochyok Waterway is one of the three canal systems connecting the Neva and the Volga, the other two being the Volga–Baltic Waterway and the Tikhvinskaya water system.

== History ==
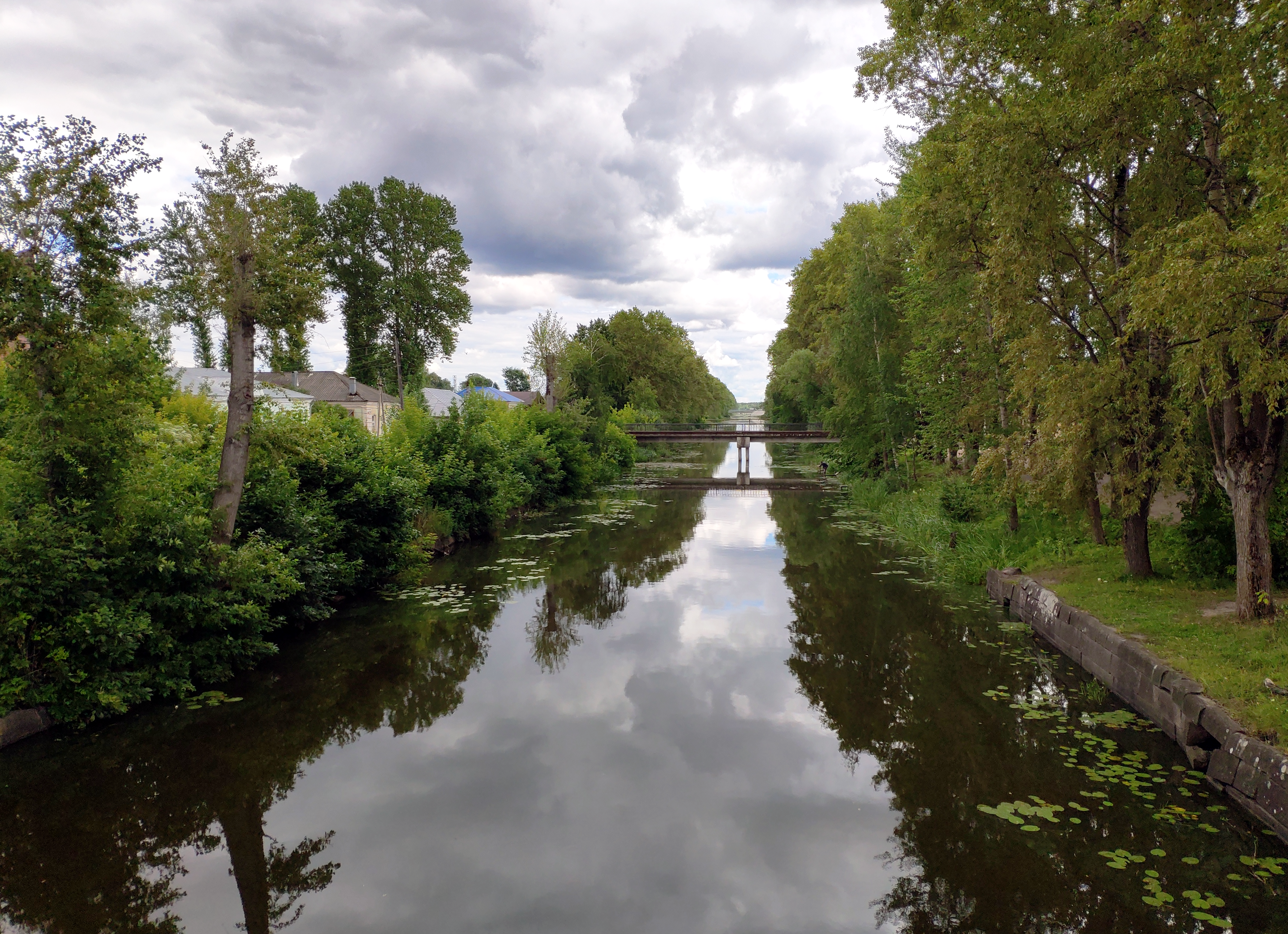
Tveretsky Canal near the Vyshny Volochyok Reservoir

The waterway from Lake Ilmen upstream the Msta and the Tsna Rivers, followed by a portage to the Tvertsa and downstream to the Volga River existed from the medieval times, as is evident from a large amount of archeological sites in the area. The name of Vyshny Volochyok is derived from Russian: волок, which means portage. On January 12, 1703 Russian Tsar Peter the Great signed a decree which ordered a canal to be built instead of the portage. Prince Matvey Gagarin was appointed the supervisor of the construction, and Adriaan Houter, a Dutch water engineer from Amsterdam, was hired to perform the construction. The waterway was opened in 1706 and became the first waterway connecting the basins of the Neva and the Volga. The canal, known as the Gagarin Canal, and later as the Tveretsky Canal, was 2,811 metres (9,222 ft) long and 15 metres (49 ft) deep. However, the construction project contained a number of mistakes, and as a result the canal decayed and at some point the navigation became impossible.

In 1719, Mikhail Serdyukov volunteered to perform the reconstruction of the canal, and on June 26, 1719 the canal was transferred under his supervision. Serdyukov built the Vyshny Volochyok Reservoir, which has two outflows, one to Lake Mstino and eventually to the Msta, and another one to the Tvertsa. He also completely reconstructed canals and locks. In 1774, the canal and surrounding areas were bought out by the state from the heirs of Serdyukov.

Over the 18th century, a number of dams were constructed on the tributaries of the Msta and the Tvertsa, in order to maintain a high level of water needed for navigation. In 1773 Jacob Sievers, then the governor of Novgorod Governorate, was appointed the supervisor of the waterway. Sievers performed a reconstruction of the system, adding two minor water reservoirs. In 1797, one more reconstruction was carried out. This resulted in the dramatic increase of the traffic. Whereas in the 1760s, up to 4000 ships were annually using the canal, after 1775 the amount grew to 55,000 per year. The heaviest traffic was between 1814 and 1849, and then it started to decline due to competition with other waterways and with the railway.

In 1778, the Vyshny Volochyok Waterway was defined as a stretch between Tver and the Ladoga Canal. It was subdivided into three parts: One between Tver and Lake Mstino, one more between Lake Mstino and Novgorod, and the third one between Novgorod and the mouth of the Volkhov River. The headquarters of the system were located in Vyshny Volochyok, which was just granted town status in 1770.
