= Taraskovo =

Taraskovo Тарасково
- Village
- Location within Vologda Oblast Location within Russia
- Coordinates: 59°42′N 39°00′E
- Country: Russia
- Region: Vologda Oblast
- District: Vologodsky District
- Time zone: UTC+3:00

Taraskovo (Russian: Тарасково) is a rural locality (a village) in Novlenskoye Rural Settlement, Vologodsky District, Vologda Oblast, Russia. The population was 6 as of 2002.

== Geography ==
Taraskovo is located 86 km northwest of Vologda (the district's administrative centre) by road. Malashkovo is the nearest rural locality.
