= Mogilyovka =

Mogilyovka Могилёвка
- Selo
- Location within Amur Oblast Location within Russia
- Coordinates: 49°25′N 130°21′E
- Country: Russia
- Region: Amur Oblast
- District: Arkharinsky District
- Time zone: UTC+9:00

Mogilyovka (Russian: Могилёвка) is a rural locality (a selo) in Gribovsky Selsoviet of Arkharinsky District, Amur Oblast, Russia. The population was 66 as of 2018. There are 3 streets.

== Geography ==
Mogilyovka is located on the left bank of the Arkhara River, 25 km east of Arkhara (the district's administrative centre) by road. Gribovka is the nearest rural locality.
