= Kuvshinovo, Vologodsky District, Vologda Oblast =

Kuvshinovo Кувшиново
- Settlement
- Location within Vologda Oblast Location within Russia
- Coordinates: 59°15′N 39°49′E
- Country: Russia
- Region: Vologda Oblast
- District: Vologodsky District
- Time zone: UTC+3:00

Kuvshinovo (Russian: Кувшиново) is a rural locality (a settlement) in Semyonkovskoye Rural Settlement, Vologodsky District, Vologda Oblast, Russia. The population was 1,140 as of 2002. There are 6 streets.

== Geography ==
Kuvshinovo is located 7 km northwest of Vologda (the district's administrative centre) by road. Chashnikovo is the nearest rural locality.
