= Tvertsa =

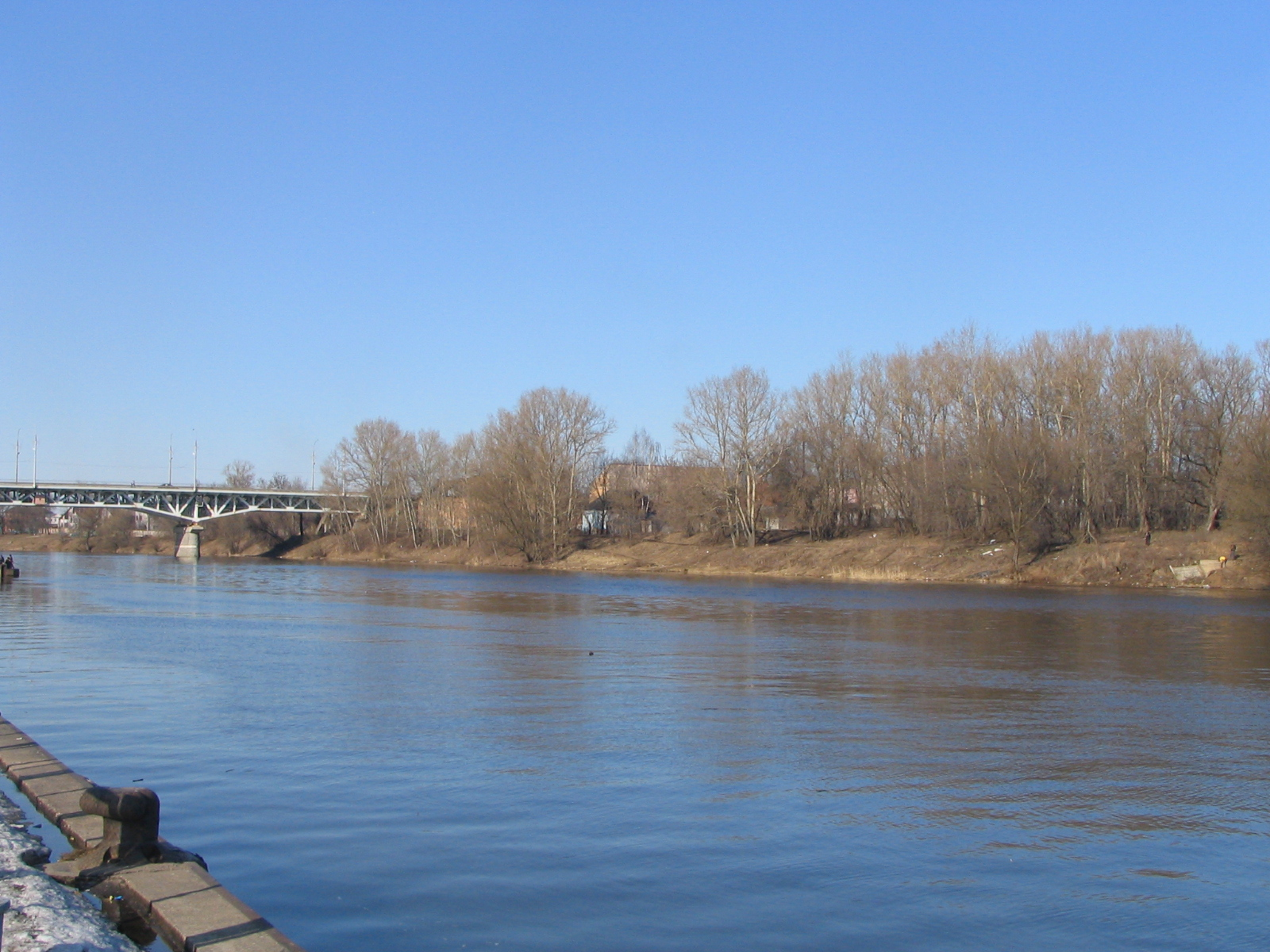
- Tvertsa River in Tver

Location
- Country: Russia

Physical characteristics
- Mouth: Volga
  - coordinates: 56.8573°N 35.921°E
- Length: 188 km (117 mi)
- Basin size: 6,510 km^{2} (2,510 sq mi)
- Discharge
  - average: 55 m^{3}/s (1,900 cu ft/s)

Basin features
- Progression: Volga→ Caspian Sea

The Tvertsa (Russian: Тверца́) is a river in Vyshnevolotsky, Spirovsky, Torzhoksky, and Kalininsky Districts, as well as in the cities of Torzhok and Tver in Tver Oblast, Russia, a left tributary of the Volga. It is 188 kilometres (117 mi) long, and the area of its basin is 6,510 square kilometres (2,510 sq mi). The principal tributaries of the Tvertsa are the Malaya Tigma (left), the Shchegrinka (right), the Osuga (right), the Logovyazh (left), and the Kava (left).

The Starotveretsky Canal, which is 2.9 kilometres (1.8 mi) long and a part of the Vyshny Volochyok Waterway, is considered the Tvertsa's riverhead, which connects the river with the Vyshny Volochyok Reservoir. The latter drains up to 80 percent of its water from the river Tsna into the Tvertsa. The Tvertsa flows south, crosses the western part of Spirovsky District, and south of Torzhok turns east. There, the river enters Kalininsky District and flows towards the city of Tver. On the northern outskirts of the city, the Tvertsa turns south. Its mouth is located in the city center of Tver. The Tvertsa River freezes up in November through early January and stays under the ice until late March or April.

The towns of Torzhok and Vyshny Volochyok are located on the Tvertsa River. The city of Tver is located at its confluence with the Volga. Since the Middle Ages the Tvertsa has been a part of a waterway connecting the Baltic Sea and the Volga, which runs along the rivers Neva, Volkhov, and Msta.

The drainage basin of the Tvertsa includes the southwestern part of Vyshnevolotsky District, the western parts of Spirovsky and Likhoslavlsky districts, the major part of Torzhoksky District, the eastern part of Kuvshinovsky District, and the northwestern part of Kalininsky District, all of Tver Oblast, as well as the town of Torzhok and parts of the cities of Vyshny Volochyok and Tver.
