= Vyshnevolotsky Uyezd =

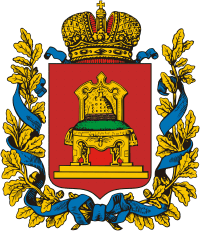
Tver Governorate coat of arms

Vyshnevolotsky Uyezd (Вышневолоцкий уезд) was one of the subdivisions of the Tver Governorate of the Russian Empire. It was situated in the northcentral part of the governorate. Its administrative centre was Vyshny Volochyok.

== Demographics ==
At the time of the Russian Empire Census of 1897, Vyshnevolotsky Uyezd had a population of 179,141. Of these, 83.4% spoke Russian, 15.5% Karelian, 0.4% Estonian, 0.2% Yiddish, 0.1% German, 0.1% Latvian and 0.1% Romani as their native language.
