= Tver Governorate =

1796–1929 unit of Russia

Coordinates: 57°N 36°E

Tver Governorate Тверская губерния
- Governorate of the Russian Empire
- 1796–1929
- Coat of arms

- Location in the Russian Empire
- Capital: Tver
- Population
- 1,769,135
- History
  - Established: 12 December 1796
  - Disestablished: 12 August 1929
- Political subdivisions: 12 uyezds

Tver Governorate (Russian: Тверская губерния, romanized: Tverskaya guberniya) was an administrative-territorial unit (guberniya) of the Russian Empire and the Russian SFSR, which existed from 1796 until 1929. Its seat was in Tver. The governorate was located in the north of the European part of the Russian Empire and bordered Novgorod Governorate in the north, Yaroslavl Governorate in the east, Vladimir Governorate in the southeast, Moscow Governorate in the south, Smolensk Governorate in the southwest, and Pskov Governorate in the west.

The area of the governorate is currently split between the Tver and Moscow oblasts. Minor parts of Tver Governorate also currently belong to the Yaroslavl and Novgorod oblasts.

== History ==
In the 18th century, the areas which were later occupied by Tver Governorate were split between Moscow and Novgorod Governorates. On 25 November 1775 Tver Viceroyalty was established with the administrative center in Tver. On 12 December 1796 the viceroyalty was transformed into Tver Governorate.

In 1796, the viceroyalty was subdivided into thirteen uyezds, however, Tver Governorate originally only had nine uyezds

- Bezhetsky Uyezd (the administrative center in the town of Bezhetsk);
- Kashinsky Uyezd (Kashin);
- Novotorzhsky Uyezd (Torzhok);
- Ostashkovsky Uyezd (Ostashkov);
- Rzhevsky Uyezd (Rzhev);
- Staritsky Uyezd (Staritsa);
- Tverskoy Uyezd (Tver);
- Vyshnevolotsky Uyezd (Vyshny Volochyok);
- Zubtsovsky Uyezd (Zubtsov).

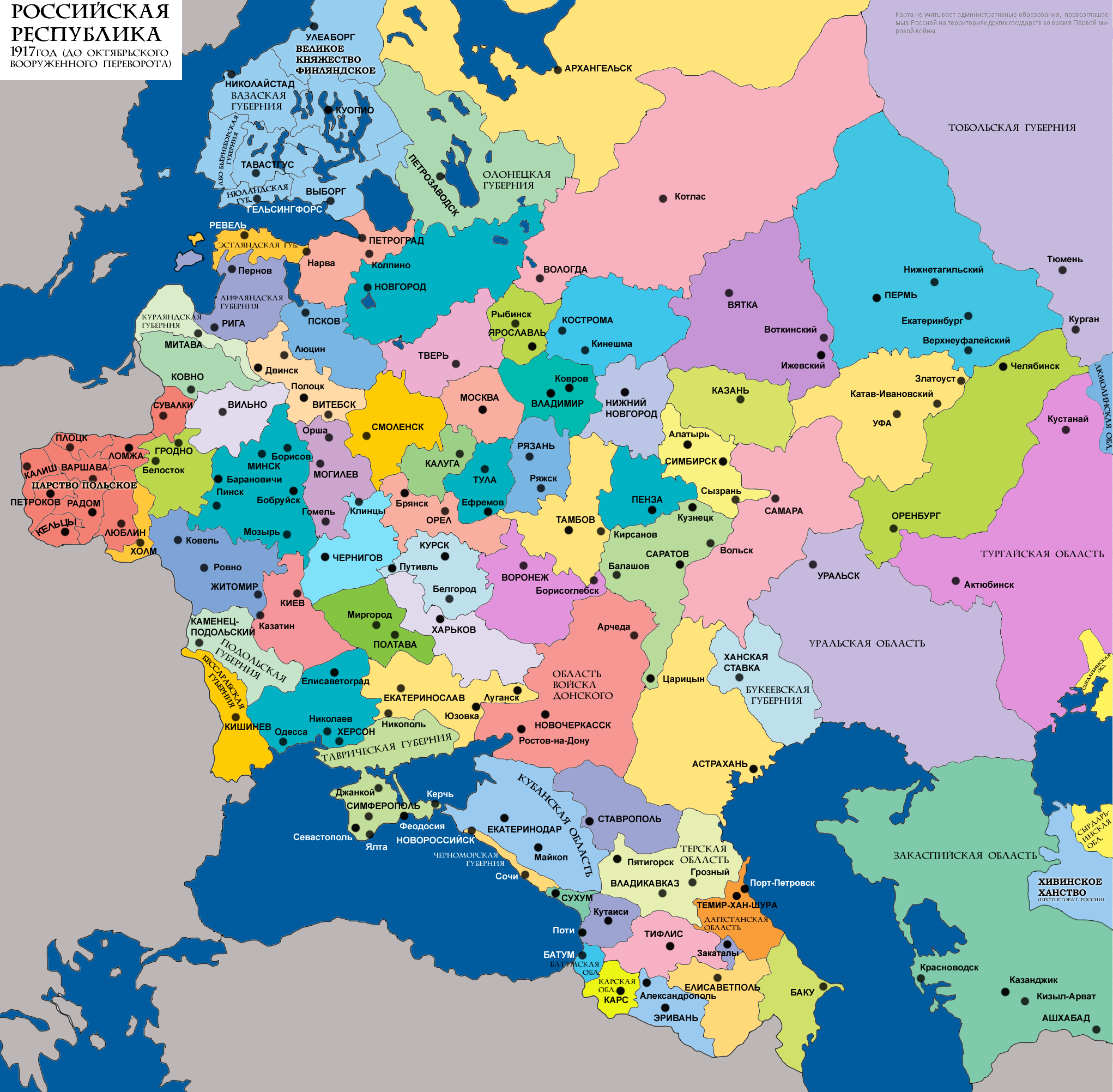
The European part of the Russian Empire in 1917. Tver Governorate is shown in magenta in the center of the map.

In 1803, three more uyezds were established: Kalyazinsky Uyezd (Kalyazin), Korchevskoy Uyezd (Korcheva), and Vesyegonsky Uyezd (Vesyegonsk).

In 1918, Krasnokholmsky Uyezd with the center of Krasny Kholm was established on the territory previously belonged to Bezhetsky and Vesyegonsky Uyezds. In the same year, Kimrsky Uyezd (Kimry) was established on the lands which belonged to Korchevskoy and Kalyazinsky Uyezds. In 1919 and 1921, minor areas, which included the town of Leninsk, were transferred to Moscow Governorate.

On 25 April 1921 Vesyegonsky and Krasnokholmsky Uyezd were transferred to Rybinsk Governorate. On 6 February 1923 Rybinsk Governorate was abolished, and the two uyezds were transferred to Tver Governorate.

On 30 May 1922 three uyezds were abolished. Zubtsovsky Uyezd was merged into Rzhevsky Uyezd, Kalyazinsky Uyezd – into Kashinsky Uyezd, and Korchevskoy Uyezd – into Kimrsky Uyezd.On 3 March 1924 Krasnokholmsky Uyezd was abolished and split between Bezhetsky and Vesyegonsky District, whereas Staritsky Uyezd was abolished and split between Rzhevsky, Novotorzhsky, and Tverskoy Uyezds. On 3 October 1927 Kashinsky Uyezd was abolished and split between Bezhetsky and Kimrsky Uyezds.

On 12 August 1929, Tver Governorate was abolished and split between Moscow and Western Oblasts.

== Demographics ==
Population by spoken language in Tver Governorate (1897)
Language	Native speakers	Percentage
Russian	1,642,506	92.8%
Karelian	117,679	6.6%
Estonian	1,516	0.08%
Yiddish	1,460	0.08%
Polish	1,424	0.08%
German	1,090	0.06%
Ukrainian	1,070	0.06%
Other languages	2.390	0.1%
Total	1,769,135	100.00

== Governors ==
The administration tasks in the governorate were executed by a governor. The governors of Tver Governorate were

- 1797–1800 Ignaty Antonovich Teyls;
- 1800–1802 Villim Fyodorovich Mertens (Willem Mertens);
- 1802–1804 Ivan Mikhaylovich Ukhtomsky;
- 1804–1812 Alexander Andreyevich Ushakov;
- 1812–1813 Luka Semyonovich Kologrivov;
- 1813–1817 Pyotr Ivanovich Ozerov;
- 1817–1826 Nikolay Sergeyevich Vsevolozhsky;
- 1826–1830 Vasily Andrianovich Borisov;
- 1830 Dmitry Mikhaylovich Obrezkov;
- 1830–1831 Pyotr Grigoryevich Gorn;
- 1831 Pyotr Ivanovich Apraksin;
- 1831–1834 Kirill Yakovlevich Tyufyayev;
- 1834–1837 Alexander Petrovich Tolstoy;
- 1837–1842 Yakov Dmitriyevich Bolgovskoy;
- 1842–1857 Alexander Pavlovich Bakunin;
- 1857–1862 Pavel Trofimovich Baranov;
- 1862–1868 Pyotr Romanovich Bagration;
- 1868–1890 Afanasy Nikolayevich Somov;
- 1890-1897 Pavel Dmitriyevich Akhlestyshev;
- 1897–1903 Nikolay Dmitriyevich Golitsyn, later the last Imperial Prime Minister of Russia;
- 1903–1904 Alexey Aleksandrovich Shirinsky-Shikhmatov;
- 1904–1905 Sergey Dmitriyevich Urusov;
- 1905–1906 Pavel Alexandrovich Sleptsov;
- 1906–1917 Nikolay Georgiyevich Byunting (Nikolai von Bünting), lynched during the February Revolution.

In 1809, Duke George of Oldenburg was appointed governor general and supervised Novgorod, Tver, and Yaroslavl Governorates. In 1812, he died, and the position of the governor general was abolished.
