= Vyshny Volochyok =

Town in Tver Oblast, Russia

Vyshny Volochyok Вышний Волочёк
- Town of oblast significance
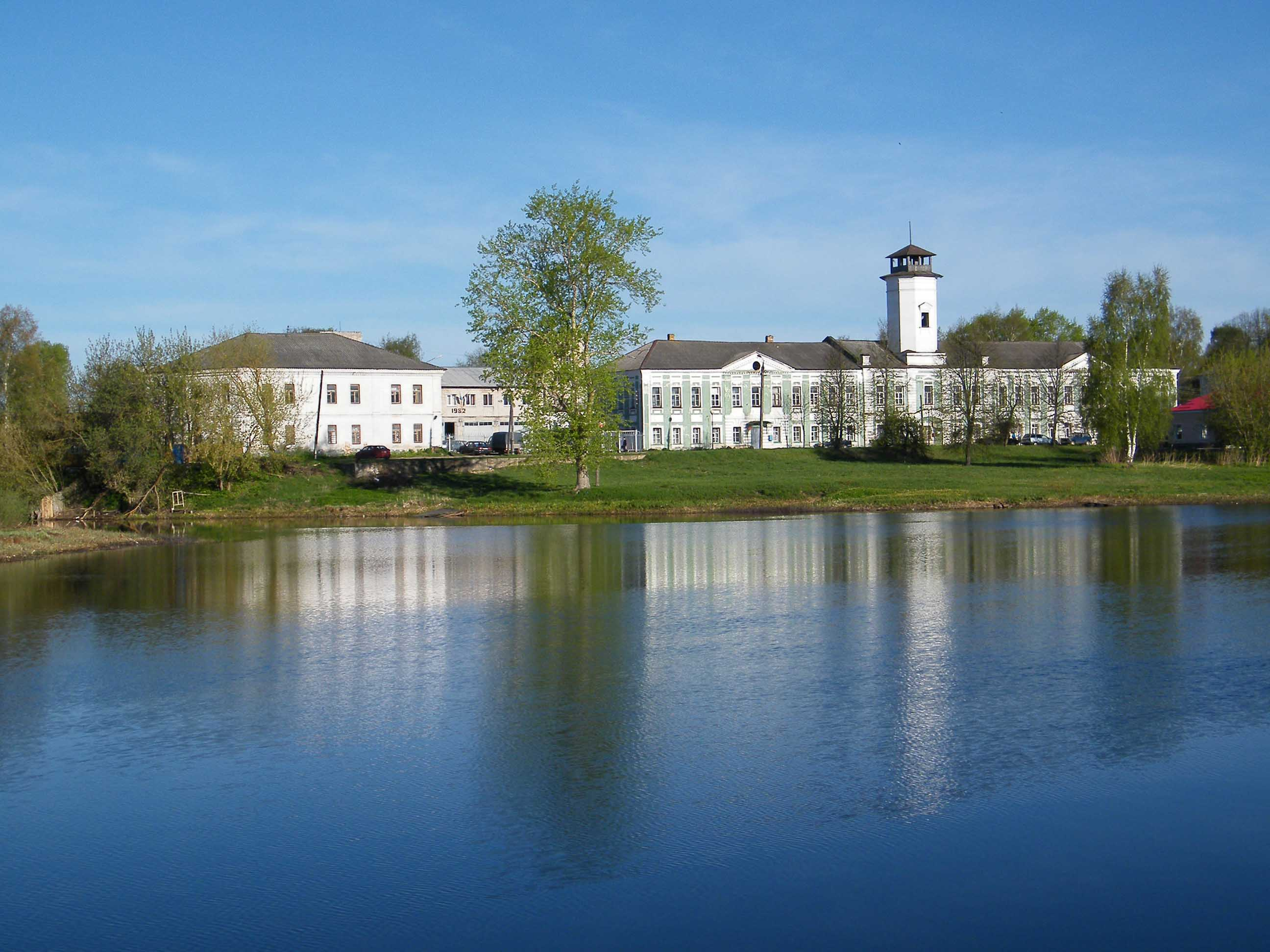
- The town as seen from the Vyshny Volochyok Reservoir

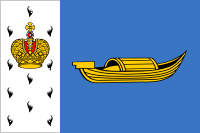
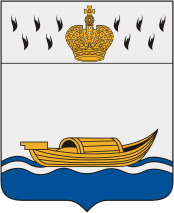
- Flag Coat of arms
- Interactive map of Vyshny Volochyok
- Location of Vyshny Volochyok Vyshny Volochyok (Europe) Vyshny Volochyok (Russia)
- Coordinates: 57°35′N 34°34′E
- Country: Russia
- Federal subject: Tver Oblast
- First mention: 1471
- Town status since: 1770

Government
  - Body: City Duma
- Elevation: 160 m (520 ft)

Population (2010 Census)
  - Total: 52,370
  - Estimate (2025): 42,884 (−18.1%)
  - Rank: 311th in 2010

Administrative status
  - Subordinated to: Vyshny Volochyok Okrug
  - Capital of: Vyshnevolotsky District, Vyshny Volochyok Okrug

Municipal status
  - Urban okrug: Vyshny Volochyok Urban Okrug
  - Capital of: Vyshny Volochyok Urban Okrug, Vyshnevolotsky Municipal District
- Time zone: UTC+3 (MSK)
- Postal code: 171151 - 171168
- Dialing code: +7 48233
- OKTMO ID: 28714000001
- Website: www.v.volochekadm.ru/ofitsialnii_sait_vishnego_volochka

Vyshny Volochyok (Russian: Вы́шний Волочёк, IPA: [ˈvɨʂnʲɪj vəlɐˈtɕɵk]) is a town in Tver Oblast, Russia. Population: 52,370 (2010 census); 56,405 (2002 census); 64,789 (1989 Soviet census).

== Geography and etymology ==
The town is located 119 kilometers (74 mi) northwest of Tver, in the Valdai Hills, between the Tvertsa and Tsna Rivers, on the watershed between the basins of the Volga and the Baltic Sea. Hence the town's name is translated from Russian as "Upper Portage".

=== Climate ===
Climate data for Vyshny Volochyok (1991–2020)
Month	Jan	Feb	Mar	Apr	May	Jun	Jul	Aug	Sep	Oct	Nov	Dec	Year
Mean daily maximum °C (°F)	−4.3 (24.3)	−3.5 (25.7)	2.2 (36.0)	10.4 (50.7)	17.4 (63.3)	21.1 (70.0)	23.4 (74.1)	21.3 (70.3)	15.3 (59.5)	7.9 (46.2)	1.0 (33.8)	−2.8 (27.0)	9.1 (48.4)
Daily mean °C (°F)	−6.9 (19.6)	−6.7 (19.9)	−1.9 (28.6)	5.2 (41.4)	11.8 (53.2)	15.9 (60.6)	18.1 (64.6)	16.1 (61.0)	10.8 (51.4)	4.8 (40.6)	−1.1 (30.0)	−4.9 (23.2)	5.1 (41.2)
Mean daily minimum °C (°F)	−9.8 (14.4)	−10.1 (13.8)	−5.9 (21.4)	0.3 (32.5)	6.0 (42.8)	10.4 (50.7)	12.9 (55.2)	11.2 (52.2)	6.9 (44.4)	2.0 (35.6)	−3.2 (26.2)	−7.4 (18.7)	1.1 (34.0)
Average precipitation mm (inches)	40.1 (1.58)	31.0 (1.22)	27.7 (1.09)	28.6 (1.13)	55.5 (2.19)	70.5 (2.78)	82.3 (3.24)	70.7 (2.78)	55.5 (2.19)	57.9 (2.28)	46.4 (1.83)	41.9 (1.65)	608.1 (23.94)
Average precipitation days (≥ 1.0 mm)	11	9	8	7	9	10	10	10	9	11	10	11	115
Average relative humidity (%)	89	84	77	69	67	71	76	79	83	86	89	89	80
Source: NOAA

== History ==
The drawing of Vyshny Volochyok in 1661-1662

The portage between the Tsna and the Tvertsa rivers existed from medieval times as confirmed by archaeological artifacts found in the area. Vyshny Volochyok as a settlement was mentioned in chronicles in 1471. In 1703–1722, Peter the Great had a canal constructed to link the two rivers (the Vyshny Volochyok Waterway). In the 1740, the road connecting Moscow and Saint Petersburg was built. These two events gave a start to the fast economic development of Vyshny Volochyok, which later also became a major center of textile manufacture and glass production. In 1772, the first fair was held, and in the first half of the 19th century the road was rebuilt in stone. In 1851, railroad construction followed.

In the course of the administrative reform carried out in 1708 by Peter the Great, Vyshny Volochyok was included into Ingermanlandia Governorate (since 1710 known as Saint Petersburg Governorate), and in 1727 Novgorod Governorate split off. On May 28, 1770, Vyshny Volochyok was granted town rights, and on April 2, 1772 Vyshnevolotsky Uyezd of Novgorod Governorate was established, with its seat in Vyshny Volochyok. In 1775, the Tver Viceroyalty was formed from the lands which previously belonged to the Moscow and Novgorod Governorates, and Vyshny Volochyok was transferred to the Tver Viceroyalty, which in 1796 was transformed into Tver Governorate.

On July 12, 1929 the governorates and uyezds were abolished. Vyshnevolotsky District, with the administrative center in Vyshny Volochyok, was established within Tver Okrug of Moscow Oblast. On July 23, 1930, the okrugs were abolished, and the districts were directly subordinated to the oblast. On January 29, 1935 Kalinin Oblast was established, and Vyshny Volochyok was transferred to Kalinin Oblast. In 1990, Kalinin Oblast was renamed Tver Oblast.

== Administrative and municipal status ==
Within the framework of administrative divisions, Vyshny Volochyok serves as the administrative center of Vyshnevolotsky District, even though it is not a part of it. As an administrative division, it is incorporated separately as Vyshny Volochyok Okrug—an administrative unit with the status equal to that of the districts. As a municipal division, Vyshny Volochyok Okrug is incorporated as Vyshny Volochyok Urban Okrug.

== Economy ==
=== Industry ===
The economy of Vyshny Volochyok is based on timber, glassmaking, and textile industries.

=== Transportation ===
The railroad connecting Moscow and Saint Petersburg passes through Vyshny Volochyok.

The M10 highway, which connects Moscow and St. Petersburg, passes through the city as well. A road connecting to Maksatikha, Bezhetsk, and Rybinsk branches out east. There are local roads as well, with the bus traffic originating from Vyshny Volochyok.

The Tvertsa and the Msta are connected by the Vyshny Volochyok Waterway, constructed in the 18th century to provide for a waterway connecting Moscow and Saint Petersburg, in particular, the Neva and the Volga. Currently, there is no passenger navigation.

== Culture and recreation ==
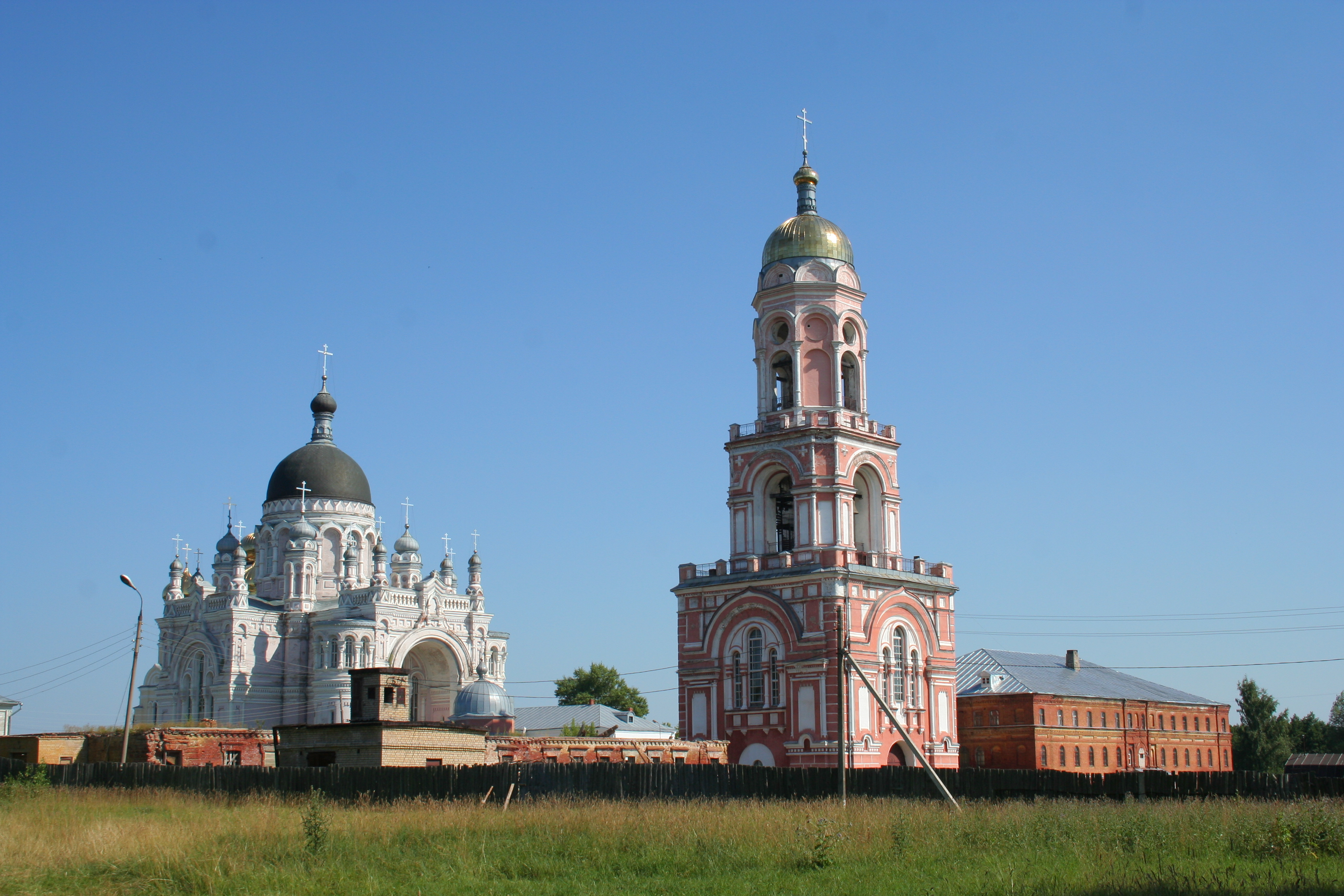
The Kazan Monastery

Vyshny Volochyok contains twenty-four cultural heritage monuments of federal significance and additionally forty-four objects classified as cultural and historical heritage of local significance. The federal monuments are the canals, dams, and embankments of the Vyshny Volochyok Waterway, the former Serdykov Estate related to the visits of Peter the Great to Vyshny Volochyok, as well as a number of buildings in the city center, including the trading arcades.

Vyshny Volochyok hosts a local museum which was open in 1932 (formally, it is a division of the Tver State United Museum). There is also a theater.

== In popular culture ==
In the episode Limerick of Cabin Pressure, Vyshny Volochyok is mentioned at the start and has a limerick devoted to it near the end.
