= Lake Mstino =

Lake in Tver Oblast, Russia

Coordinates: 57°40′03″N 34°28′23″E

Mstino
- Мстино (Russian)
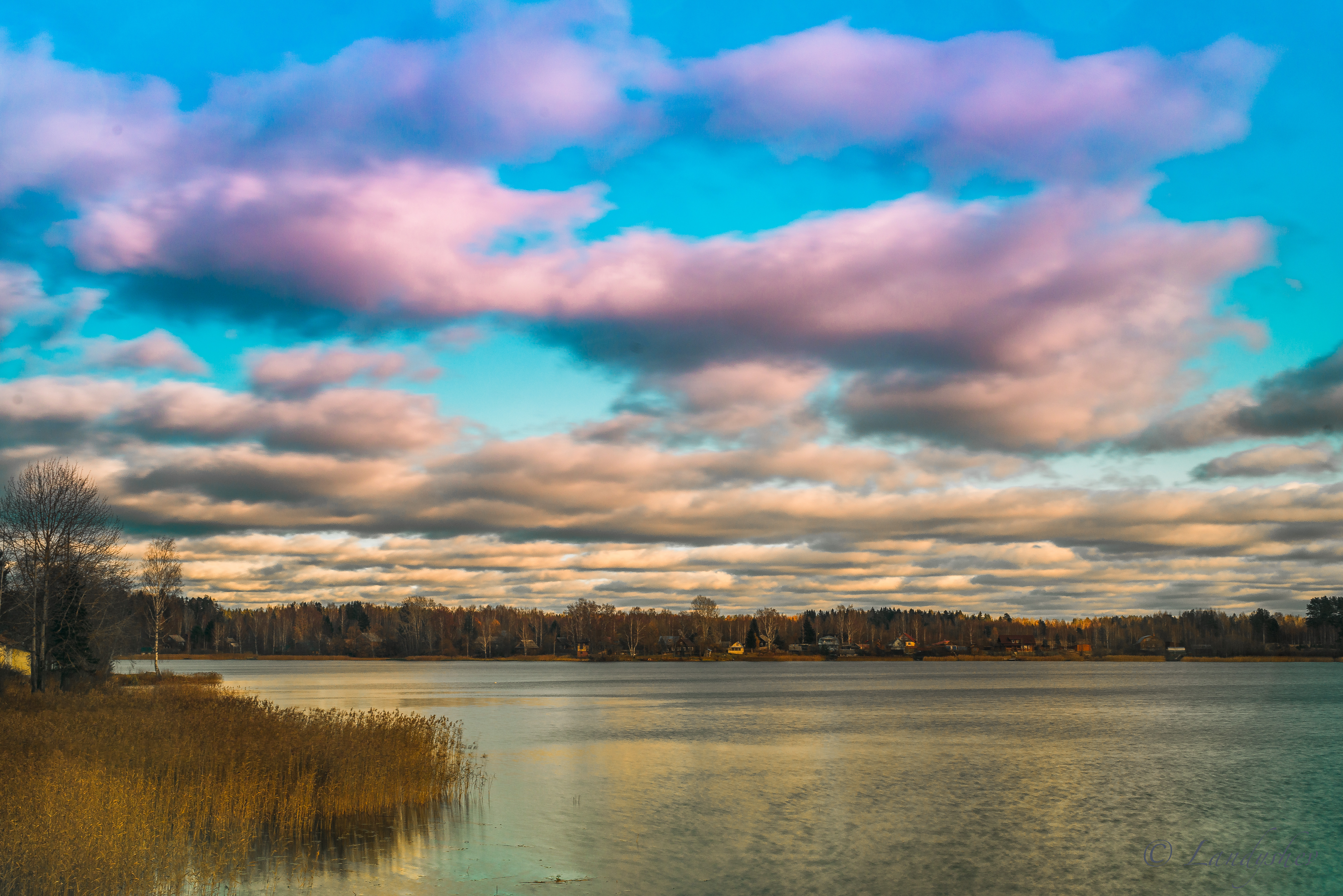

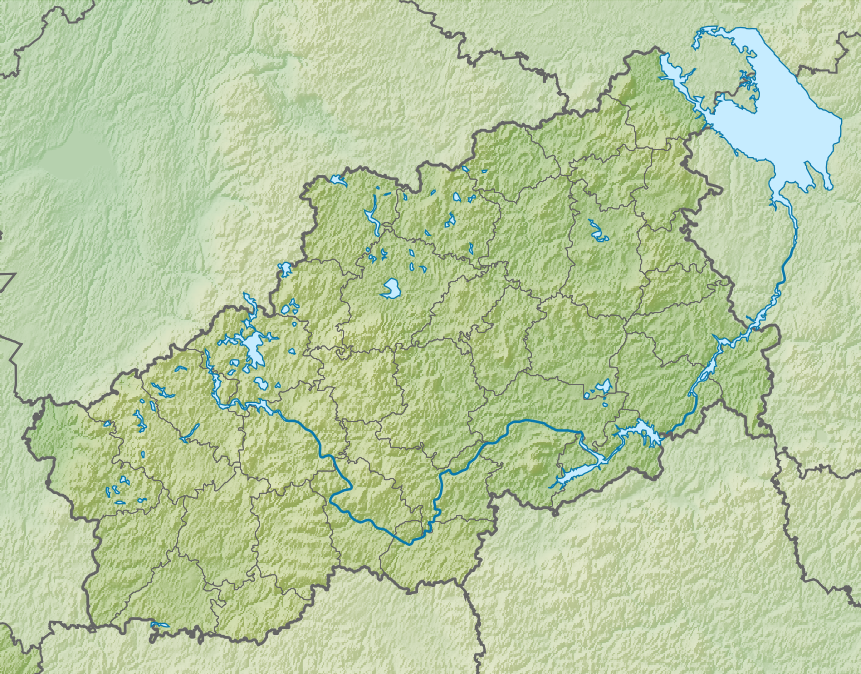
- Location within Tver Oblast Location within European Russia
- Location: Tver Oblast, Russia
- Primary outflows: Msta River
- Max. length: 13.8 kilometres (8.6 mi)
- Max. width: 1.8 kilometres (1.1 mi)
- Surface area: 13.7 kilometres (8.5 mi)
- Max. depth: 10 metres (33 ft)
- Surface elevation: 154 kilometres (96 mi)

Mstino (Russian: Мстино́) is a lake in Tver Oblast, Russia, in the Valdai Hills area. Its main outflow is Msta River. The lake occupies an area of 13.7 square kilometres (5.3 mi^{2}), its length is 13.8 kilometres (8.6 mi), and its maximum width 1.8 kilometres (1.1 mi). It lies at an altitude of 154 meters, with maximum depth of 10 meters.

== See also ==
- Akademicheskaya Dacha, an artist base on the Mstino Lake
