= Krasnomaysky =

Krasnomaysky (masculine), Krasnomayskaya (feminine), or Krasnomayskoye (neuter) may refer to:

- Krasnomaysky, Tver Oblast, an urban-type settlement in Tver Oblast, Russia
- Krasnomaysky, Republic of Mordovia, a settlement in the Republic of Mordovia, Russia
- Krasnomaysky, Republic of Tatarstan, a settlement in the Republic of Tatarstan, Russia
- Krasnomayskaya, Bryansk Oblast, a settlement in Bryansk Oblast, Russia
