= Velikooktyabrsky =

Velikooktyabrsky Великооктябрьский
- Work settlement
- Interactive map of Velikooktyabrsky
- Location of Velikooktyabrsky Velikooktyabrsky (Tver Oblast)
- Coordinates: 57°26′0″N 33°48′50″E
- Country: Russia
- Federal subject: Tver Oblast
- Administrative district: Firovsky District
- Founded: 1832
- Urban-type settlement status since: 1941

Population (2010 Census)
  - Total: 2,834
  - Estimate (2021): 2,068 (−27%)

Municipal status
  - Municipal district: Firovsky Municipal District
  - Urban settlement: Velikooktyabrskoye Urban Settlement
  - Capital of: Velikooktyabrskoye Urban Settlement
- Time zone: UTC+3 (MSK)
- Postal code: 172715
- OKTMO ID: 28657157051

Velikooktyabrsky (Russian: Великооктя́брьский) is an urban-type settlement in Firovsky District of Tver Oblast, Russia. It is located on the left bank of the Tsna River. Population: 2,273 (2010 census); 2,659 (2002 census); 3,019 (1989 Soviet census).

== History ==
Velikooktyabrsky was founded in 1832 as a settlement serving the glass-making factory which belonged to local landowner Lvov. It was moved to the current location in 1875. At the time, it was a part of Valdaysky Uyezd of Novgorod Governorate. In 1912, the factory was bought by Pavel Ryabushinsky and reorganized. In 1923, the factory was nationalized and subsequently renamed into Veliky Oktyabr. The settlement was renamed as well. Effective October 1, 1927 Novgorod Governorate with its uyezds was abolished, and Rozhdestvensky District was established, with the administrative center in the selo of Rozhdestvo. It was a part of Borovichi Okrug of Leningrad Oblast. Velikooktyabrsky became a part of Rozhdestvensky District. On September 20, 1931, Rozhdestvensky District was abolished and merged into Bologovsky District of Leningrad Oblast.

On March 5, 1935 Kalinin Oblast was established. It included areas which formerly belonged to Moscow, Leningrad, and Western Oblasts. In particular, Firovsky District with the administrative center in Firovo was established. Velikooktyabrsky became a part of Firovsky District. In February 1963, during the abortive administrative reform by Nikita Khrushchev, Firovsky District was merged into Vyshnevolotsky District, but on April 6, 1972 it was re-established. In 1990, Kalinin Oblast was renamed Tver Oblast.

== Economy ==
=== Industry ===
The economy of the settlement was almost solely dependent on the glass-making factory which produced window glass. In 2010, the factory was declared bankrupt. There are plans to attract major investors and to revive it.

=== Transportation ===
Velikooktyabrsky is located on a paved road which connects Firovo with Krasnomaysky and Vyshny Volochyok. The same road provides access to the M10 highway, which runs between Moscow and Saint Petersburg. There is a regular bus traffic through Velikooktyabrsky.

A railway connects Velikooktyabrsky with Firovo, but there is no passenger traffic.
