= Komkino =

Komkino (Russian: Комкино) is the name of several rural localities in Russia:

- Komkino, Nizhny Novgorod Oblast, a village under the administrative jurisdiction of the town of oblast significance of Pervomaysk in Nizhny Novgorod Oblast; 55°2′N 43°30′E
- Komkino, Tver Oblast, a village in Rozhdestvenskoye Rural Settlement of Firovsky District in Tver Oblast
