= Parfino (inhabited locality) =

Parfino (Russian: Парфино) is the name of several inhabited localities in Parfinsky District of Novgorod Oblast, Russia.

Urban localities

- Parfino, a work settlement under the administrative jurisdiction of Parfinskoye Settlement

Rural localities

- Parfino (railway station), a rural locality classified as a railway station in Fedorkovskoye Settlement
- Parfino (village), a village in Fedorkovskoye Settlement
