= Shlina =

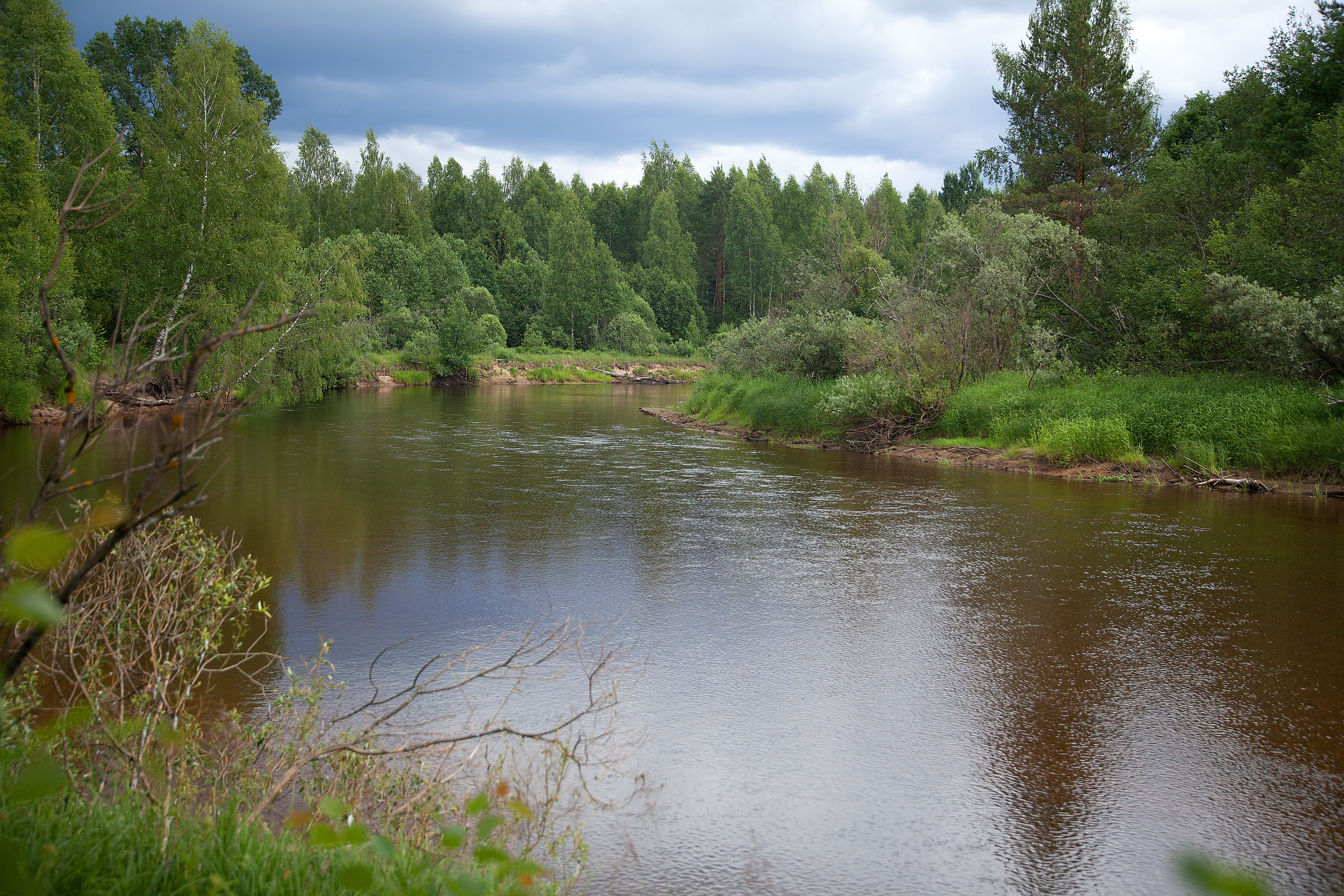
- Native name: Шлина (Russian)

Location
- Country: Russia

Physical characteristics
- Source
  - location: Lake Shlino
- Mouth: Tsna
  - location: Vyshny Volochyok Reservoir
  - coordinates: 57°37′07″N 34°25′12″E
- Length: 102 km (63 mi)
- Basin size: 2,300 km^{2} (890 sq mi)

Basin features
- Progression: Tsna→ Msta→ Lake Ilmen→ Volkhov→ Lake Ladoga→ Neva→ Gulf of Finland

The Shlina (Russian: Шлина) is a river in Firovsky, Bologovsky, and Vyshnevolotsky Districts, as well as of the closed urban-type settlement of Ozyorny of Tver Oblast of Russia. It is a tributary of the Tsna River (technically, of the Vyshny Volochyok Reservoir) and belongs to the drainage basin of the Neva and the Baltic Sea. It is 102 kilometres (63 mi) long, and the area of its basin is 2,300 square kilometres (890 sq mi). The principal tributaries of the Shlina are the Granichnaya (right), the Shlinka (left), and the Lonnitsa (right). The Lonnitsa is technically an inflow of the Vyshny Volochyok Reservoir.

The whole course of the Shlina belongs to the Valdai Hills. The source of the river is Lake Shlino which is shared between Tver and Novgorod Oblasts. The Shlina flows out at the Tver Oblast side close to the village of Komkino and flows east. It crosses Firovsky District, a stretch of it makes the border between Ozyorny and Firovsky District. Further east the Shlina returns to Firovsky District, crosses the southern part of Bologovsky District, and enters Vyshnevolotsky District. It enters the Vyshny Volochyok Reservoir by the settlement of Krasnomaysky.

The drainage basin of the Shlina includes much of the area of Firovsky District, as well as parts of Demyansky and Valdaysky Districts of Novgorod Oblast and of Ostashkovsky, Bologovsky, and Vyshnevolotsky Districts of Tver Oblast. The urban-type settlement of Firovo is located in the drainage basin of the Shlina.
