= 7th Guards Rocket Division =

7th Guards Missile Division Rezhitskaya Krasnoznamennaya (7 gv.rd)
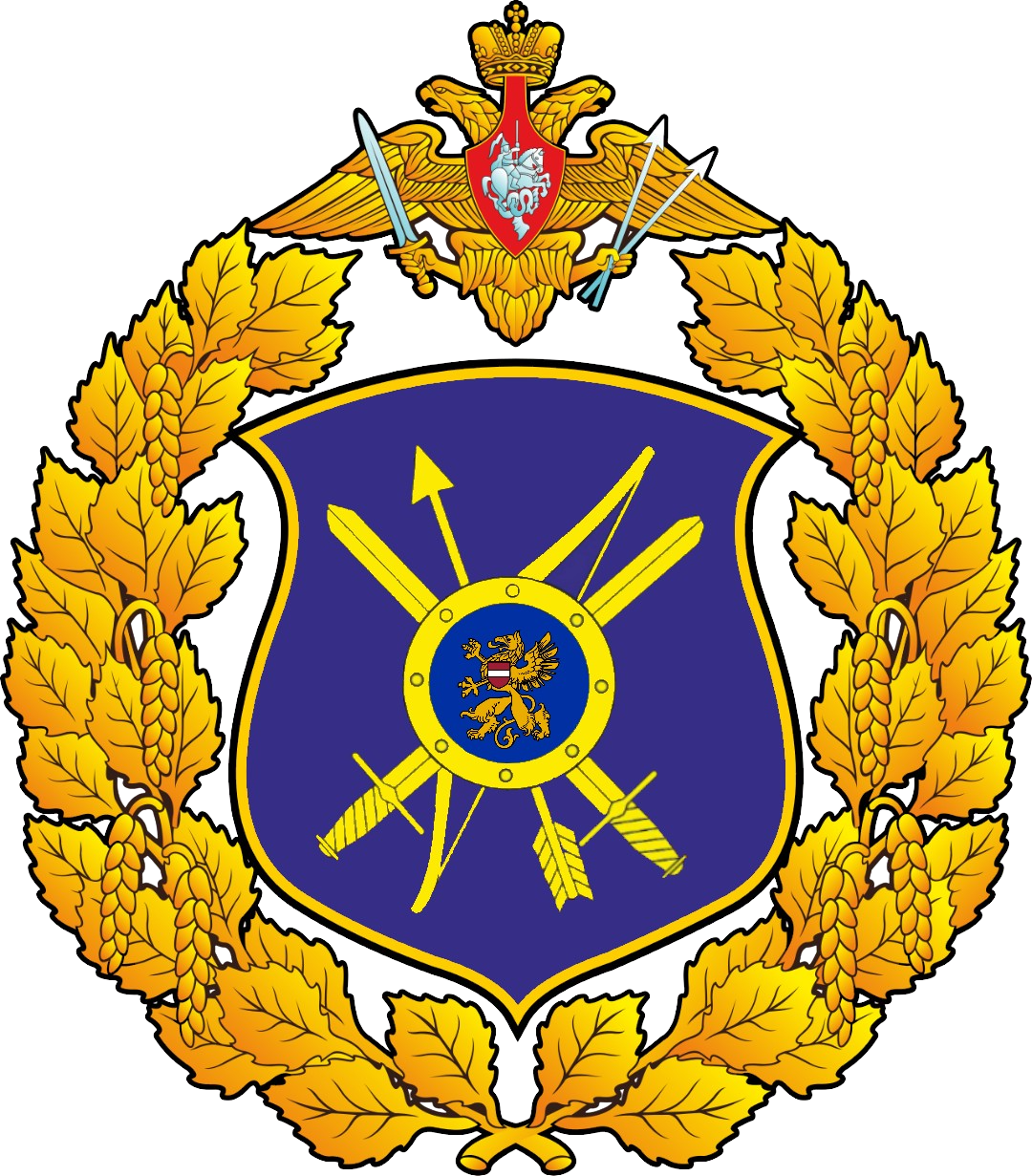
- Division emblem
- Active: 1961–present
- Country: Soviet Union (1961–1991); Russia (1991–present)
- Branch: Strategic Rocket Forces
- Garrison/HQ: Ozyorny, Tver Oblast (in Vypolzovo)
- Decorations: Order of the Red Banner

Commanders
- Current commander: Colonel Andrey Nikolayevich Malinin

The 7th Guards Missile Rezhitskaya Red Banner division (Military Unit Number 14245), abbreviated as 7 GRD, is a military unit of the 27th Guards Missile Army, Strategic Rocket Forces stationed in Ozyorny, Bologovsky District, Tver Oblast, Russia.

== History ==
On 14 July 1943, the 19th Separate Guards Cannon Artillery Brigade was formed on the basis of the 79th Guards Cannon Artillery Regiment in the area of Staraya Russa. On 27 July 1944, the brigade was awarded the honorific of "Rezhitsa" for bravery and heroism shown by its personnel in the battles for the capture of Rēzekne in Latvia, as commended by the Supreme Commander-in-Chief.

During the Great Patriotic War, the brigade fought its way from Staraya Russa to Saldus, Latvia, with Colonel M.I. Sokolov commanding the brigade throughout the war. The actions of the entire brigade personnel were highly praised by the Supreme Commander-in-Chief, and 1,200 servicemen were awarded government awards.

In June 1960, the 7th Missile Engineering Brigade was formed in accordance with the directive of the Minister of Defense of the USSR, dated 25 May 1960. The new brigade was formed on the basis of the 19th Guards Cannon Artillery Rezhitskaya Brigade, redeployed from Gatchina to the village of Vypolzovo in the Kalinin Oblast (Bologoye-4). The formation of the brigade took place on the housing stock of the 25th Mixed Aviation Division of the 6th Separate Air Defense Army, with Guards Colonel P. P. Uvarov appointed as commander of the missile brigade. The brigade numbered 9,000 personnel, including soldiers and sergeants. Initially, the brigade was part of the 46th training artillery range; from 10 March 1961, it became part of the 3rd Separate Guards Missile Corps.

The first unit to be formed was a missile regiment (military unit 14264) consisting of three divisions: two with ground launchers and one with a silo launcher. On 30 November 1960, the brigade commander reported to the Supreme Commander-in-Chief that the formation of the missile brigade - military unit 14245 - had been completed. Scheduled training with the R-5 Pobeda missile commenced in early 1961.

On 30 May 1961, by the directive of the Minister of Defense of the USSR, the 7th Missile Brigade was transformed into the 7th Missile Division of central subordination. On 14 April 1961, to preserve the combat traditions and memory of the military merits accomplished by the soldiers of the 19th Separate Guards Cannon Artillery Brigade during the Great Patriotic War, the unit was given the honorary title "Guard Rezhitskaya". The division included 4 missile regiments (military units 14264, 14474, 14420, 14443), a repair technical base, a communications center, and support units. The annual celebration date remained the same - 14 July 1943. On 16 July 1961, the unit was awarded the Red Banner.

On 16 August 1961, Division Captain 3rd rank L. S. Shvygin conducted the division's first R-5 (8K51) missile launch at the Kapustin Yar test site and received a rating of "good." In December 1962, the combat crew of the first division of one of the missile regiments (unit 14264) conducted the first standard launch of the R-16 missile (8K64) for the division at the Baikonur test site.

On 11 February 1963, the first division (BSP-12) entered combat duty with two R-16s with ground-based launchers. In total, six divisions (BSP) entered combat duty in 1963-1964: four with ground-based launchers and two with silo-based launchers.

On 24 May 1963, shortly after the end of the Cuban Missile Crisis, in an atmosphere of the strictest secrecy, the division was visited by First Secretary Nikita Khrushchev, Cuban Prime Minister Fidel Castro, and Marshals of the Soviet Union Rodion Malinovsky and Nikolai Krylov. Khrushchev showed Castro the new R-16 missile.

On 20 March 1964, the division was incorporated into the 3rd Separate Guards Missile Corps with R-16 missiles (8K64). In June 1964, R-16 missile regiments were formed on the basis of the division: military units 14264, 07382, 12408, 14474, 57388, 74201, 14420, and 68528. The combat duty positions of the regiments were located near the borders of the Tver and Novgorod Oblasts.

From 1965, the division began preparing for the construction of a new generation of missile systems with individual launch silos. In accordance with the General Staff directive dated 31 March 1966, six new missile regiments with UR-100 missiles (8K84) were formed. In 1967, the first of these regiments went on combat duty.

On 1 November 1967, the division was awarded the Commemorative Banner of the Central Committee of the CPSU, the Presidium of the Supreme Soviet of the USSR, and the Council of Ministers of the USSR for success in military labor in honor of the 50th anniversary of the October Revolution.

From April 1970 to 30 June 1990, the division was part of the 50th Rocket Army in Smolensk. In April 1970, five more regiments began rearming with the UR-100 missile system.

Starting in 1973, work began to remove the UR-100 from combat duty and deploy new 15P015 systems with the MR-UR-100 missile (15A15) (from 1977, replaced by the 15P016 complex with the MR-UR-100U). The first regiment with the 15A15 missile went on combat duty on 6 May 1975. Between 15 October 1975 and 3 October 1978, eight more regiments were put on duty, replacing the Chelomeyev UR-100 with the Yangel MR-UR-100.

On 30 April 1975, by decree of the Presidium of the Supreme Soviet of the USSR, the division was awarded the Order of the Red Banner.

On 3 October 1978, two missile regiments with the modernized 15P016 complex with the MR-UR-100U missile entered combat duty.

On 14 December 1979, the division was awarded the pennant of the Ministry of Defense of the USSR "For Courage and Military Valor".

From 1982, according to the General Staff plan, some of the regiments with MR-UR-100 were removed from duty and disbanded, while others were transferred to the improved 15P016 complex.

From March 1986, the division conducted comparative tests of the 15U157 wheeled launchers on the MAZ-7906 and MAZ-7907 (since September) chassis of the 15P162 Tselina-2 missile system with the RT-23 Molodets missile (15Zh62) weighing 104.5 tons. These tests were carried out on the basis of the division and required the construction of enormous hangars and special road sections with bridges and interchanges to test the destructive effects on asphalt concrete pavement. All work was carried out only at night and under strict secrecy. The tests were completed in September 1987, with the selection of the launcher on the 12-axle articulated chassis MAZ-7907.

In 1994, the last silo missile regiment was removed from combat duty. In accordance with the decision of the Council of Ministers of Russia, a museum of missile forces was organized on the basis of one of the combat launch positions of military unit 14264, which was subsequently disbanded. On 30 December 1994, the first silo regiment (military unit 14264) was transferred to the Topol ICBM with the RT-2PM missile (15Zh58). On 27 December 1996, the second regiment (military unit 52642) of Topols went on combat duty. In the fall of 1996, the combat crews of the division's missile regiments carried out two successful combat training launches at the Plesetsk training ground.

The annual holiday is on July 14.

== Command ==
- From May 1960 to 13 April 1970 – Major general Petr Petrovich Uvarov
- From 13 April 1970, to 21 November 1973 – Major general Yuri S. Marsac
- From 21 November 1973, to 3 December 1977 – Major general Alexander P. Volkov
- From 3 December 1977, to 4 January 1982 – Major general Yevgeny Ivanov
- From 4 January 1982, to 31 July 1986 – Major general Viktor Khramchenkov
- From 31 July 1986, to 14 July 1998 – Major general Alexander Gribov
- From 14 July 1998, to 4 July 2000 – Major general Aleksey Abramov
- From 4 June 2000, to 2006 – Major general Anatoly Shura
- From June 2006 to December 2009 – Major general Ivan Nikolaevich Kuzichkin
- From December 2009 to May 2011 – Colonel Alexander M. Galaktionov
- From July 2011 to August 2013 – Colonel Andrei Anatolyevich Burbin
- From August 2013 to April 2016 – Colonel Oleg Vyacheslavovich Lankin
- From April 2016 – Major general Maxim Vladimirovich Ryabchenko
- From December 2020 – Colonel Andrey Nikolaevich Malinin

== Subordinate units ==
The division included 11 missile regiments:

- 129th missile regiment (military unit 97688) - disbanded 1 December 1989
- 222nd missile regiment (military unit 95835) - disbanded 7 January 1990
- 319th missile regiment (military unit 52643) - disbanded 1 December 1989
- 320th missile regiment (military unit 52644) - disbanded 1 December 1989
- 509th missile regiment (military unit 52641) - disbanded 30 January 1990
- 510th Guards missile Tver regiment (military unit 52642) (site 3k)
- 818th missile regiment (military unit 74201) (51st site) - disbanded 1 December 1993
- 272nd missile regiment (military unit 68528) (42nd site), - disbanded
- 342nd Guards missile regiment (military unit 57338) - disbanded 30 October 1990
- 256th (526) missile regiment (military unit 07382) (11th site, 12th site), - disbanded 1 October 1993
- 41st missile regiment (military unit 14264) (site 1C)

Other military formations:

- 281st Communication Centre (military unit 03394), since 2012 military unit 14245-B (US)
- Communications Repair Base (CRB) (military unit 40262)
- 212th separate group of regulations for combat control and communication means (SGRCC CM) as part of the 1193rd combat control center (CCC) (military unit 49494) 606310, Nizhny Novgorod region, Dalnee Konstantinovo-5
- 2423rd technical missile base (TMB) (military unit 96778) (platform 5, 6)
- 1501st repair and technical base (RTB) (military unit 33787)
- 509th separate engineer-demining battalion (military unit 03071)
- 41st operational and technical commandant's office (military unit 63627), pos. Ozerny, st. Sovetskaya, 7
- 29th Separate Helicopter Squadron at Vypolzovo (air base) (military unit 65177) - disbanded in December 2001
- guard and reconnaissance battalion (GRB) (military unit 14245)
- 61st station (postal service) (military unit 80253)
- separate operational and regulatory group (SORG) (military unit 14245-R) - disbanded
- 3rd separate medical and sanitary battalion (SMSB) (military unit 46181)
- 9th mobile car repair shop (MCRS) (military unit 14245-D)
- 261st complex technical control unit (CTCU) (military unit 14245-R)
- military school for junior specialists (MSJS) (military unit 14245-B)

== Weapons ==
In different years, the armaments division standing missile systems:

- In 1963–1977 years. – P-16U (8K64U);
- In 1967–1979 years. – UR-100 (8K84);
- As in 1975–1991. – MR UR-100 (15A15);
- In 1978–1994 years. – MR UR-100U (15A16);
- From 1994 to present. at. – RT-2PM Topol (15ZH58).

== Anniversary ==
On 14 July, the Division's Anniversary is celebrated – since 1943 when the 19th Separate Guards artillery gunnery brigade was established.

== Works cited ==
- Ministry of Defense (1999). Sergeyev, Igor D.; Yakovlev, Vladimir Nikolaevich; Solovtsov, Nicholas E. (eds.). Voennyi entsiklopedicheskii Slovar Raketnykh Voisk Strategicheskogo Naznacheniia [Military Encyclopedia of Strategic Missile Forces]. Moscow: Great Russian encyclopedia. pp. 438–439. ISBN 978-5-85270-315-6.
- Gagarin, VG, ed. (2006). Vladimirskaia Raketnaia Strategicheskaia Kratkaia Khronika Osnovnykh Sobytii [Vladimir strategic missile: a brief chronicle of major events in the history of missile Army]. Comp. IV Tops and others. Vladimir: Arkaim. pp. 292–310. ISBN 978-5-93767-023-6.
