= Bologovsky =

Bologovsky (masculine), Bologovskaya (feminine), or Bologovskoye (neuter) may refer to:

- Bologovsky District, a district of Tver Oblast, Russia
- Bologovskaya, a rural locality (a village) in Arkhangelsk Oblast, Russia
