= Kuzhenkino (urban-type settlement) =

Kuzhenkino Куженкино
- Work settlement
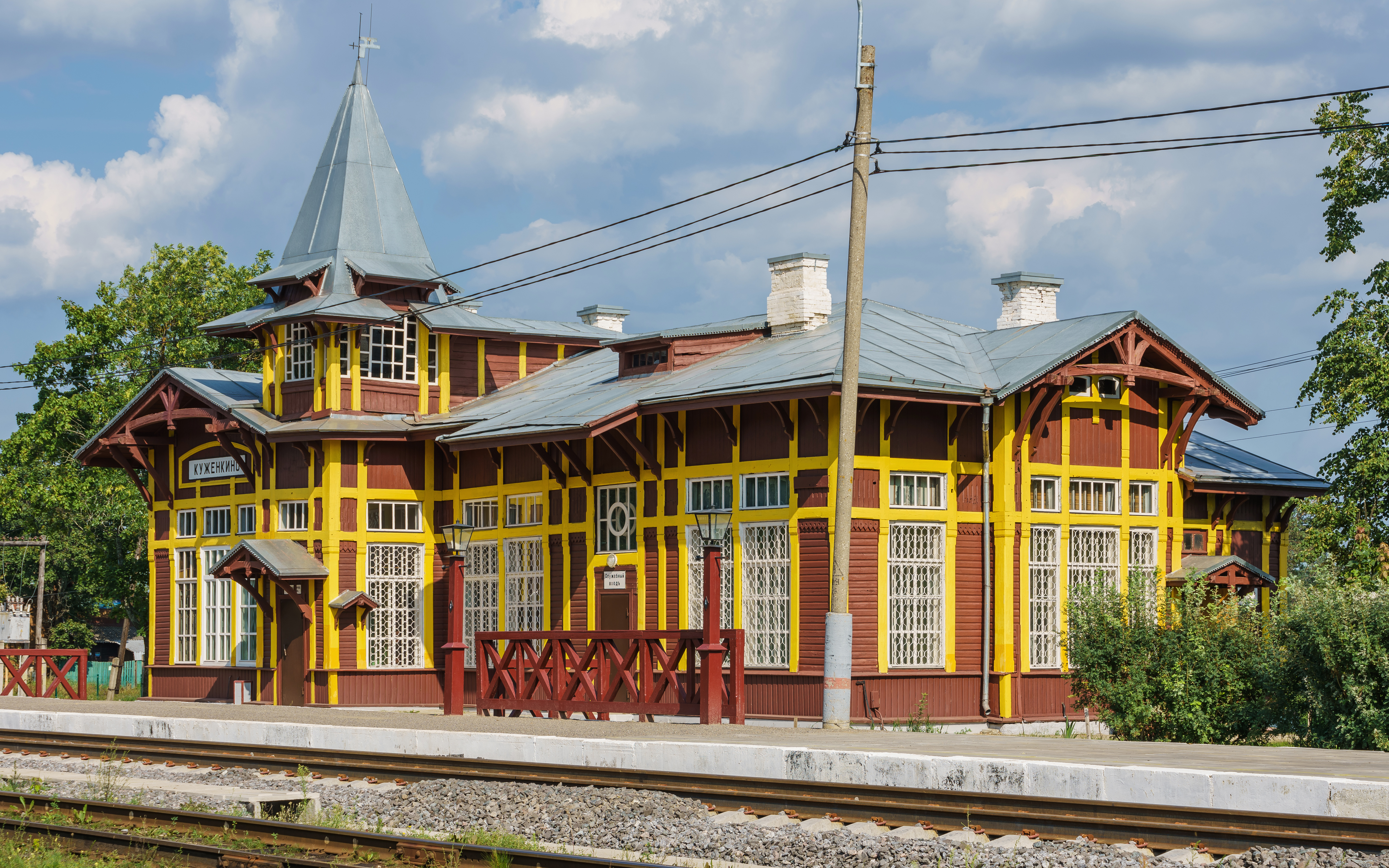
- Kuzhenkino rail station

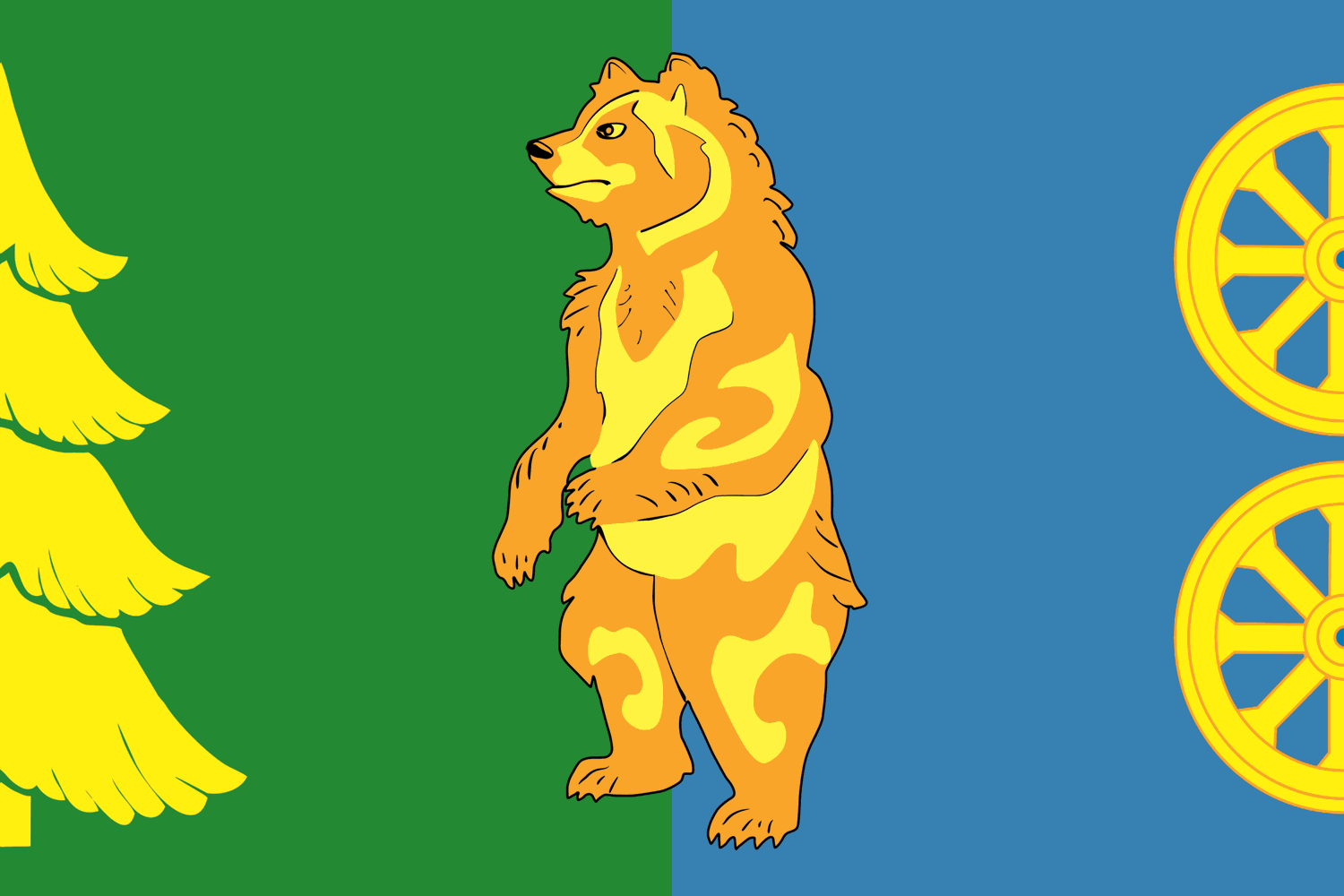
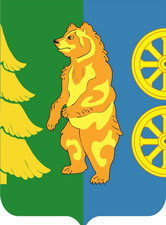
- Flag Coat of arms
- Interactive map of Kuzhenkino
- Location of Kuzhenkino Kuzhenkino (Tver Oblast)
- Coordinates: 57°43′26″N 33°58′25″E
- Country: Russia
- Federal subject: Tver Oblast
- Administrative district: Bologovsky District

Population (2010 Census)
  - Total: 2,834
  - Estimate (2021): 1,918 (−32.3%)

Municipal status
  - Municipal district: Bologovsky Municipal District
  - Urban settlement: Kuzhenkinskoye Urban Settlement
  - Capital of: Kuzhenkinskoye Urban Settlement
- Time zone: UTC+3 (MSK)
- Postal code: 171055
- OKTMO ID: 28608163051

Kuzhenkino (Russian: Куже́нкино) is an urban-type settlement in Bologovsky District of Tver Oblast, Russia, located on the north of the oblast, close to the border with Novgorod Oblast. Population: 2,834 (2010 census); 3,537 (2002 census); 3,969 (1989 Soviet census).

Kuzhenkino is located on the north of the oblast, close to the border with Novgorod Oblast.

== History ==
In 1907, Bologoye - Polotsk Railway was opened, and Kuzhenkino became one of the original stations of the railway. At the time, it belonged to Valdaysky Uyezd of Novgorod Governorate. In August 1927, the governorates and uyezds were abolished. Bologovsky District, with the administrative center in the town of Bologoye, was established within Borovichi Okrug of Leningrad Oblast effective October 1, 1927. It included parts of former Valdaysky Uyezd. Kuzhenkino became a part of the district. On July 23, 1930, the okrugs were abolished, and the districts were directly subordinated to the oblast. On January 29, 1935 Bologovsky District was transferred to newly established Kalinin Oblast.

In 1939, Kuzhenkino was granted urban-type settlement status. In 1990, Kalinin Oblast was renamed Tver Oblast.

The settlement was the location for the 2023 Wagner Group plane crash. According to the Russian emergency ministry, a plane en route from Moscow to St. Petersburg crashed near Kuzhenkino on 23 August 2023. The flight reportedly contained 10 passengers, among them Russian army officer and alleged Wagner Group co-founder Dmitry Utkin and Wagner Group leader Yevgeny Prigozhin, who led a mutiny in Russia just 2 months prior.

== Economy ==
=== Transportation ===
Kuzhenkino is located on the railway line which connects Bologoye with Velikiye Luki via Andreapol. There is infrequent passenger traffic along the line.

The M10 highway, which connects Moscow and St. Petersburg, passes just north of Kuzhenkino.
