= Lykoshino (settlement), Bologovsky District, Tver Oblast =

Rural locality in Bologovsky District, Tver Oblast, Russia

Coordinates: 58°06′26″N 33°42′40″E

Lykoshino (Russian: Лыко́шино) is a rural locality (a settlement) in Bologovsky District of Tver Oblast, Russia, located on the Valdayka River, northwest of the town of Bologoye (the administrative center of the district).

It has a railway station on the Moscow – Saint Petersburg Railway. On November 27, 2009, it was the closest settlement to the 2009 Nevsky Express bombing, and its residents aided in evacuating the train.
