= Polistovsky Nature Reserve =

Strict nature reserve in Pskov Oblast, Russia

- IUCN category Ia (strict nature reserve)
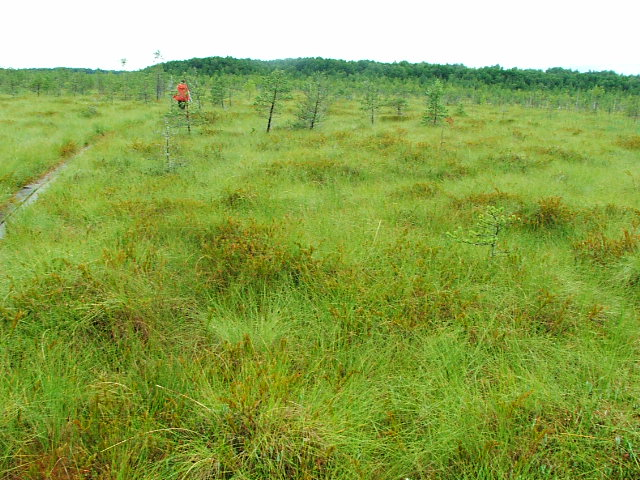
- Cranberry Bog, Polistovsky Reserve

- Location within European Russia Location within Russia
- Interactive map of Polistovsky Nature Reserve
- Location: Russia
- Nearest city: Novorzhev
- Coordinates: 57°10′15″N 30°33′25″E
- Area: 379.83 km^{2} (146.65 sq mi)
- Established: May 25, 1994

Polistovsky Nature Reserve, Polistovsky Zapovednik (Russian: Полистовский заповедник) is a strict nature reserve (a zapovednik) in the northwest of Russia, located in Bezhanitsky and Loknyansky Districts of Pskov Oblast, in the Polist-Lovat Swamp System. The reserve is about 120 km southeast of the city of Pskov. It was formally established on May 25, 1994. Previously, it functioned as a zakaznik. The nature reserve is created to protect the raised bog ecosystems of the Northwestern Russia.

== Location and geography ==
The area of the reserve is elongated from southeast to northwest and is adjacent to the border between Pskov and Novgorod Oblasts. At the other side of the border, in Novgorod Oblast, the nature reserve continues as Rdeysky Nature Reserve. The nature reserve is divided between the drainage basins of the Lovat River and the Polist River.

The territory of Polistovsky Nature Reserve is a glacial landscape, which is essentially a flat swampy area with a large amount of lakes. Some areas are forested.

== Ecoregion and climate ==
The reserve is in the Sarmatic mixed forests ecoregion, a band of mixed oak/spruce/pine forests stretching from southern Sweden to the Ural Mountains. The climate is Humid continental climate, cool summer (Köppen climate classification (Dfb)). This climate is characterized by large swings in temperature, both diurnally and seasonally, with mild summers and cold, snowy winters

== Flora ==
The area mostly consists of raised bogs. Forest grows on the islands on the bog. The main types forest are coniferous forests based on spruce and broadleaf forest, based on oak and linden. Birch and aspen appeared as derivative forest from oak and linden. Around 370 species of plants grow in the reserve.

== Fauna ==
European mink is a critically endangered mammal species which is resident in the reserve.

== See also ==
- Nature reserves in Russia
- National Parks of Russia
