= Poddorye =

Village in Novgorod Oblast, Russia

Poddorye Поддорье
- Selo
- Interactive map of Poddorye
- Location of Poddorye Poddorye (Novgorod Oblast)
- Coordinates: 57°28′N 31°07′E
- Country: Russia
- Federal subject: Novgorod Oblast
- Administrative district: Poddorsky District
- SettlementSelsoviet: Poddorskoye Settlement

Population (2010 Census)
  - Total: 1,860
  - Estimate (2010): 1,860 (0%)

Administrative status
  - Capital of: Poddorsky District, Poddorskoye Settlement

Municipal status
  - Municipal district: Poddorsky Municipal District
  - Rural settlement: Poddorskoye Rural Settlement
  - Capital of: Poddorsky Municipal District, Poddorskoye Rural Settlement
- Time zone: UTC+3 (MSK)
- Postal code: 175260
- OKTMO ID: 49634437101

Poddorye (Russian: Поддорье) is a rural locality (a selo) and the administrative center of Poddorsky District of Novgorod Oblast, Russia, located in the southwest of the oblast, on the Redya River, a left tributary of the Lovat River. Municipally, it is the administrative center of Poddorskoye Rural Settlement. Population: 1,860 (2010 census); 1,957 (2002 census); 2,122 (1989 Soviet census).

== History ==
The selo of Poddorye was first mentioned in 1809. At that time, it was a part of Starorussky Uyezd of Novgorod Governorate. In 1824, Poddorskaya Volost was transformed into a military settlement and subordinated to the Defense Ministry. Later in the 19th century, it was transferred back to Starorussky Uyezd.

On August 1, 1927, the uyezds were abolished, and Poddorsky District was established, with the center in Poddorye. Novgorod Governorate was abolished as well, and the district belonged to Novgorod Okrug of Leningrad Oblast. On July 23, 1930, the okrugs were abolished, and the districts became directly subordinate to the oblast. During World War II, Poddorye was occupied by German troops. On July 5, 1944, Poddorsky District was transferred to newly established Novgorod Oblast. On March 31, 1945 the district center was transferred to the selo of Peregino, but on December 19, 1949 it was transferred back to Poddorye.

== Economy ==
=== Industry ===
The biggest industrial enterprise in Poddorye and Poddorsky District is the butter production factory in Poddorye. In 2011, it produced about 80% of all industrial goods in the district.

=== Transportation ===
A road connecting Staraya Russa with Kholm passes through Poddorye. There are also local roads.

== Culture and recreation ==
Poddorye hosts the Poddorsky District Museum, which was founded in 1987 and displays collections of local interest. The museum belongs to the district administration.
