= Krasnomaysky, Tver Oblast =

Krasnomaysky Красномайский
- Work settlement
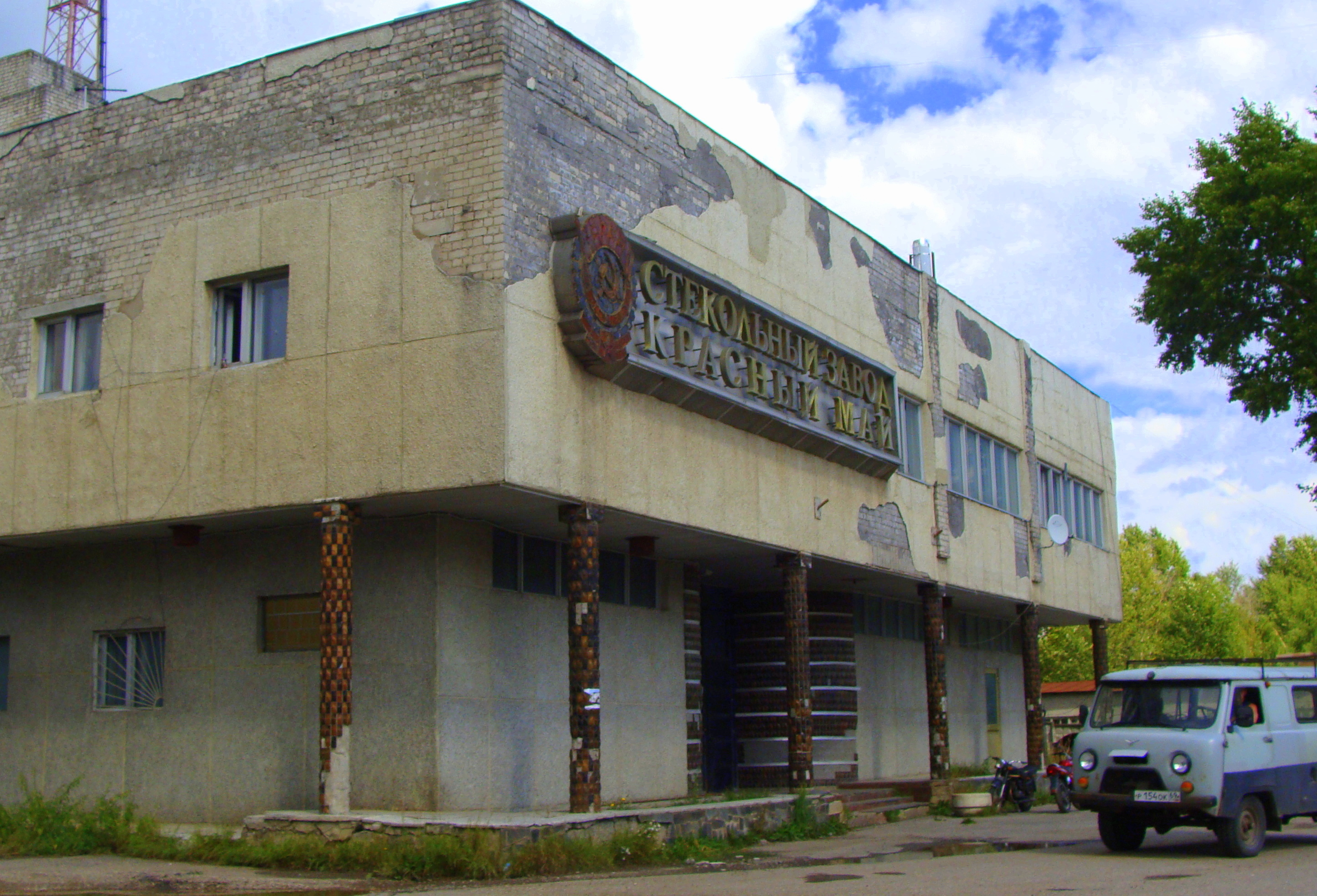

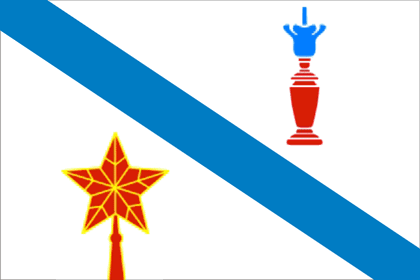
- Flag
- Interactive map of Krasnomaysky
- Location of Krasnomaysky Krasnomaysky (Tver Oblast)
- Coordinates: 57°36′57″N 34°24′41″E
- Country: Russia
- Federal subject: Tver Oblast
- Administrative district: Vyshnevolotsky District

Population (2010 Census)
  - Total: 5,007
  - Estimate (2021): 4,393 (−12.3%)

Municipal status
  - Municipal district: Vyshnevolotsky Municipal District
  - Urban settlement: Krasnomayskoye Urban Settlement
  - Capital of: Krasnomayskoye Urban Settlement
- Time zone: UTC+3 (MSK)
- Postal code: 171121
- OKTMO ID: 28612162051

Krasnomaysky (Russian: Краснома́йский) is an urban-type settlement in Vyshnevolotsky District of Tver Oblast, Russia. It is located on the bank of the Vyshny Volochyok Reservoir in the mouth of the Shlina River. Population: 5,007 (2010 census); 5,796 (2002 census); 6,854 (1989 Soviet census).

== History ==
Krasnomaysky was known since the 15th century as the village of Klyuchino (Klyuchinskaya Pustosh). Klyuchino was located on the bank of the Shlina, close to the portage to the Tvertsa River, one of the most popular trade routed of the medieval Russia. In 1858–59, merchant Samarin built a chemical plant, and the settlement was founded to serve the plant. Subsequently, the plant was sold to merchant Andrey Bolotin, who converted it into a glass-making factory. The factory started operation in 1873, and became the first one in Russia to produce colored glass of a broad range of colors. At the time, the settlement was located in Vyshnevolotsky Uyezd of Tver Governorate. The factory was nationalized in 1920 and renamed Krasny May ("Red May", referring to International Workers' Day) in 1923.

On August 12, 1929 the governorates and uyezds were abolished. Vyshnevolotsky District, with the administrative center in Vyshny Volochyok, was established within Tver Okrug of Moscow Oblast, and Krasnomaysky became a part of the district. On July 23, 1930, the okrugs were abolished, and the districts were directly subordinated to the oblast. On January 29, 1935 Kalinin Oblast was established, and Vyshnevolotsky District was transferred to Kalinin Oblast. In 1990, Kalinin Oblast was renamed Tver Oblast.

== Economy ==
=== Industry ===
The main industrial enterprise in Krasnomaysky is a glass-making factory, founded in 1859. It stopped working in 2001 and was restructured in 2002.

=== Transport ===
Krasnomaysky is located close to Leontyevo railway station on the railroad connecting Moscow and St. Petersburg. Leontyevo has regular passenger connections with Bologoye and Tver.

The M10 highway, which connects Moscow and St. Petersburg, runs over the northern boundary of Krasnomaysky. A road connecting to Firovo branches out west.

== Culture and recreation ==
The settlement has one monument classified as a historical monument of local significance. This is a collective grave of soldiers fallen in World War II.

The glass museum is open at the glass-making factory. The exposition contains historical samples as well as contemporary glass made at the factory.
