= Rdeysky Nature Reserve =

Strict nature reserve in Novgorod Oblast, Russia

- IUCN category Ia (strict nature reserve)
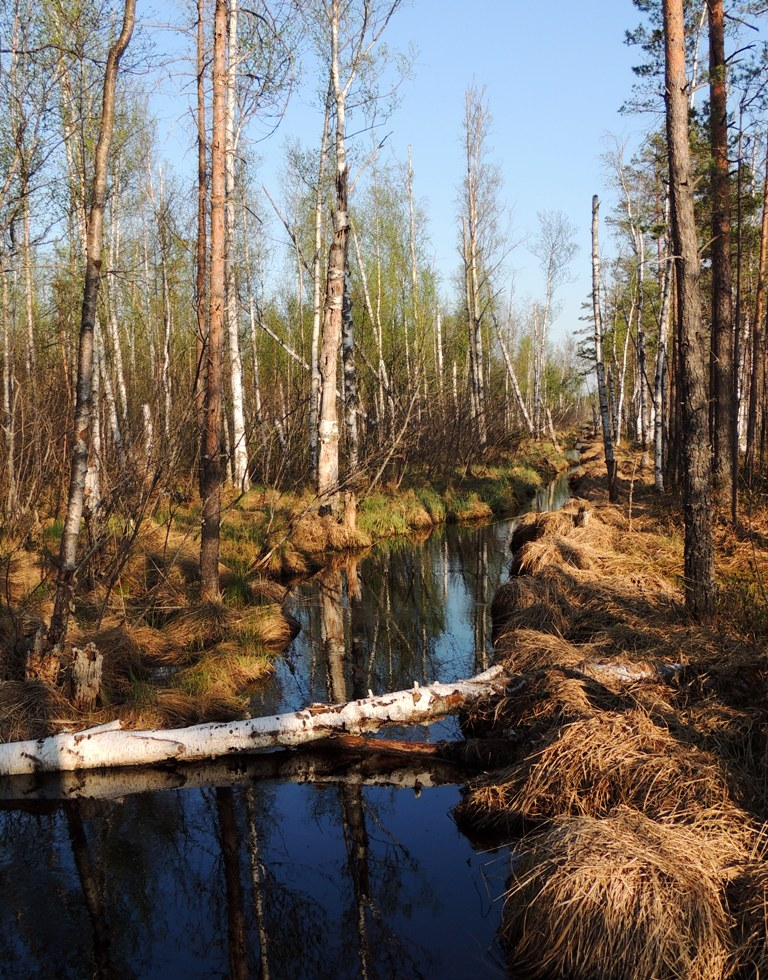
- Tupichenka River, Rdeysky Nature Reserve

- Location within Russia
- Location: Russia
- Nearest city: Kholm
- Coordinates: 57°16′N 30°48′E
- Area: 369.22 km^{2} (142.56 sq mi)
- Established: May 25, 1994

Rdeysky Nature Reserve, Rdeysky Zapovednik (Russian: Рдейский заповедник) is a nature reserve (a zapovednik) in the northwest of Russia, located in Poddorsky and Kholmsky Districts of Novgorod Oblast, in the Polist-Lovat Swamp System. The reserve is about 180 km southeast of the city of Pskov. It was established on May 25, 1994. The nature reserve is created to protect the raised bog ecosystems of the Northwestern Russia.

== Location and geography ==
The area of the reserve is elongated from southeast to northwest and is adjacent to the border between Novgorod and Pskov Oblasts. At the other side of the border, in Pskov Oblast, the nature reserve continues as Polistovsky Nature Reserve. Rdeysky Nature Reserve belongs to the river basins of the Lovat River and the Polist River, though none of them flows through the reserve. Lake Rdeyskoye, a major lake at the northwest of the reserve of which a part of the shore belongs to the reserve, is the source of the Redya River, a major left tributary of the Lovat River.

== History ==
There are currently no villages at the territory of the reserve; however, in the past it was populated, and the last village existed until World War II. The villages were located on islands in the middle of the swamp, and their inhabitants were collecting timber. Small-scale timber production was continuing after the war as well, but the area was too remote to support the settlements. No irrigation work has ever been performed in the area, and the raised bogs remain intact. In 1994, both Rdeysky and Polistovsky Nature Reserves were established to protect the area.

== Ecoregion and climate ==
The reserve is located in one of the most southerly locations of the Scandinavian and Russian taiga ecoregion. This ecoregion is situated in Northern Europe between tundra in the north and temperate mixed forests in the south. The climate is Humid continental climate, warm summer (Köppen climate classification (Dfb)). This climate is characterized by large swings in temperature, both diurnally and seasonally, with mild summers and cold, snowy winters

== Flora ==
The area mostly consists of raised bogs. Forest grows on the islands on the bog. The main types forest are coniferous forests based on spruce and broadleaf forest, based on oak and linden. Birch and aspen appeared as derivative forest from oak and linden. Around 400 species of plants grow in the reserve.

== Fauna ==
European mink is a critically endangered mammal species which is resident in the reserve. The reserve hosts the largest population of Eurasian curlew in Europe.
