= Firovsky District =

Firovsky District Фировский район (Russian)
- District
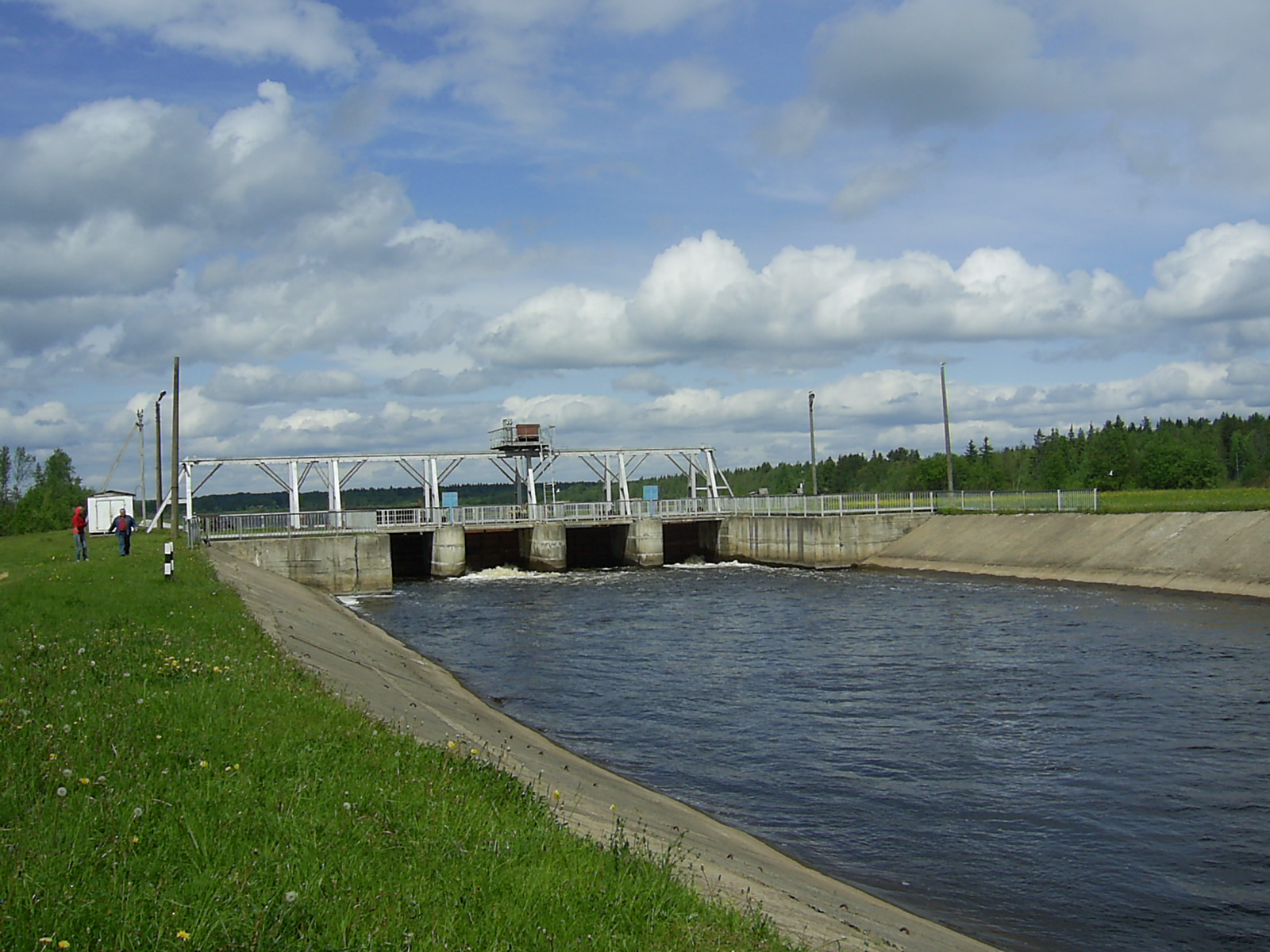
- Dam on the Shlina River, Firovsky District

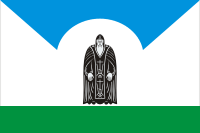
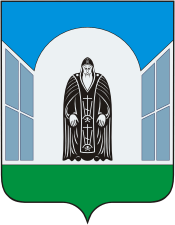
- Flag Coat of arms
- Location of Firovsky District in Tver Oblast
- Coordinates: 57°29′00″N 33°42′09″E
- Country: Russia
- Federal subject: Tver Oblast
- Established: 5 March 1935
- Administrative center: Firovo

Area
  - Total: 1,836 km^{2} (709 sq mi)

Population (2010 Census)
  - Total: 9,396
  - Density: 5.118/km^{2} (13.25/sq mi)
  - Urban: 50.1%
  - Rural: 49.9%

Administrative structure
  - Administrative divisions: 2 Urban settlements, 3 Rural settlements
  - Inhabited localities: 2 urban-type settlements, 106 rural localities

Municipal structure
  - Municipally incorporated as: Firovsky Municipal District
  - Municipal divisions: 2 urban settlements, 3 rural settlements
- Time zone: UTC+3 (MSK)
- OKTMO ID: 28657000
- Website: http://glavafirovo.narod.ru/

Firovsky District (Russian: Фи́ровский райо́н) is an administrative and municipal district (raion), one of the thirty-six in Tver Oblast, Russia. It is located in the north of the oblast and borders with the urban-type settlement of Ozyorny in the north, Bologovsky District in the northeast, Vyshnevolotsky District in the east, Kuvshinovsky District in the south, Ostashkovsky District in the southwest, Demyansky District of Novgorod Oblast in the west, and with Valdaysky District, also of Novgorod Oblast, in the northwest. The area of the district is 1,836 square kilometers (709 sq mi). Its administrative center is the urban locality (an urban-type settlement) of Firovo. Population: 9,396 (2010 Census); 11,919 (2002 census); 14,282 (1989 Soviet census). The population of Firovo accounts for 25.9% of the district's total population.

== Geography ==
Almost the whole area of the district belongs to the drainage basin of the Msta River and thus to the Baltic Sea. The rivers in the northern part of the district drain into the Shlina River and its major tributary, the Granichnaya River. The Shlina originates in Lake Shlino, located on the border between Tver and Novgorod Oblasts, and crosses the northern part of the district. The main river in the southern part of the district is the Tsna, which crosses the area of the district as well. Both the Shlina and the Tsna are left tributaries of the Msta, technically of the Vyshny Volochyok Reservoir. Some areas in the east of the district belong to the Lonnitsa River, a right tributary of the Shlina. Minor areas in the southeast of the district belong to the drainage basin of the Tvertsa River, a tributary of the Volga River.

Firovsky District is located on the Valdai Hills which are notable by its large lake district. The largest lakes within the district are Lake Shlino and Lake Seremo. More than 50% of the area of the district is covered by forest.

== History ==
The area was in the Middle Ages dependent on the Novgorod Republic, later it belonged to Derevskaya Pyatina, one of the five pyatinas into which Novgorod Lands were divided. The village of Zhabny is believed to be founded in the 12th century and to be a native place of Nilus Stolobensky, the 15th century saint and the founder of the Nilov Monastery on Stolobny Island. In the course of the administrative reform carried out in 1708 by Peter the Great, the area was included into Ingermanland Governorate (known since 1710 as Saint Petersburg Governorate). In 1727, separate Novgorod Governorate was split off. In 1775, Tver Viceroyalty (since 1796 known as Tver Governorate) was established, and parts of the current area of the district were transferred to Tver Viceroyalty. In the 19th century, the area was split between Valdaysky Uyezd of Novgorod Governorate and Vyshnevolotsky and Ostashkovsky Uyezds of Tver Governorate.

Effective October 1, 1927 Novgorod Governorate with its uyezds was abolished, and Rozhdestvensky District was established, with the administrative center in the selo of Rozhdestvo. It was a part of Borovichi Okrug of Leningrad Oblast. On September 20, 1931, Rozhdestvensky District was abolished and merged into Bologovsky District. The area of the district currently belongs to Firovsky District.

On July 12, 1929 Tver Governorate with its uyezds was abolished, and Vyshnevolotsky District was established, with the administrative center in the town of Vyshny Volochyok. It belonged to Tver Okrug of Moscow Oblast. On July 23, 1930, the okrugs were abolished, and the districts were directly subordinated to the oblast.

On October 1, 1929 Western Oblast was established. The northern part of Ostashkovsky Uyezd was transferred to Northern Oblast, and the oblast was divided into districts. In particular, Ostashkovsky District with the administrative center of Ostashkov was established as a part of Velikiye Luki Okrug. On August 1, 1930 the okrugs were abolished, and the districts were subordinated directly to the oblast.

On March 5, 1935 Kalinin Oblast was established. It included areas which formerly belonged to Moscow, Leningrad, and Western Oblasts. In particular, Firovsky District was established on the areas which previously belonged to Bologovsky, Ostashkovsky, and Vyshnevolotsky Districts. In February 1963, during the abortive administrative reform by Nikita Khrushchev, Firovsky District was merged into Vyshnevolotsky District, but on April 6, 1972 it was re-established. In 1990, Kalinin Oblast was renamed Tver Oblast.

Another district established on July 12, 1929 was Yesenovichsky District with the administrative center in the selo of Yesenovichi. It was a part of Tver Okrug of Moscow Oblast. In 1935, it was transferred to Kalinin Oblast. On August 22, 1958 Yesenovichsky District was abolished and split between Vyshnevolotsky, Novotorzhsky, Kamensky, and Firovsky Districts.

== Economy ==
=== Industry ===
There are enterprises of timber and food industries in the district. The glass-making factory in Velikooktyabrsky which was the largest industrial enterprise of the district was declared bankrupt in 2010.

=== Agriculture ===
The main agricultural specialization of the district is cattle breeding with meat and milk production.

=== Transportation ===
A railway connecting Bologoye and Velikiye Luki crosses the district from northeast to southwest. Firovo is the main railway station within the district. There is infrequent passenger traffic.

Firovo is connected by a paved road with Vyshny Volochyok. The road also provides access to the M10 highway which connects Moscow and Saint Petersburg. There are also local roads, one of which crosses into Novgorod Oblast.

== Culture and recreation ==
The district twelve objects classified as cultural and historical heritage of local significance. They include a number of historical buildings as well as several monuments to soldiers fallen in World War II.

Firovo hosts a local museum.
