= Parfino =

Parfino Парфино
- Work settlement
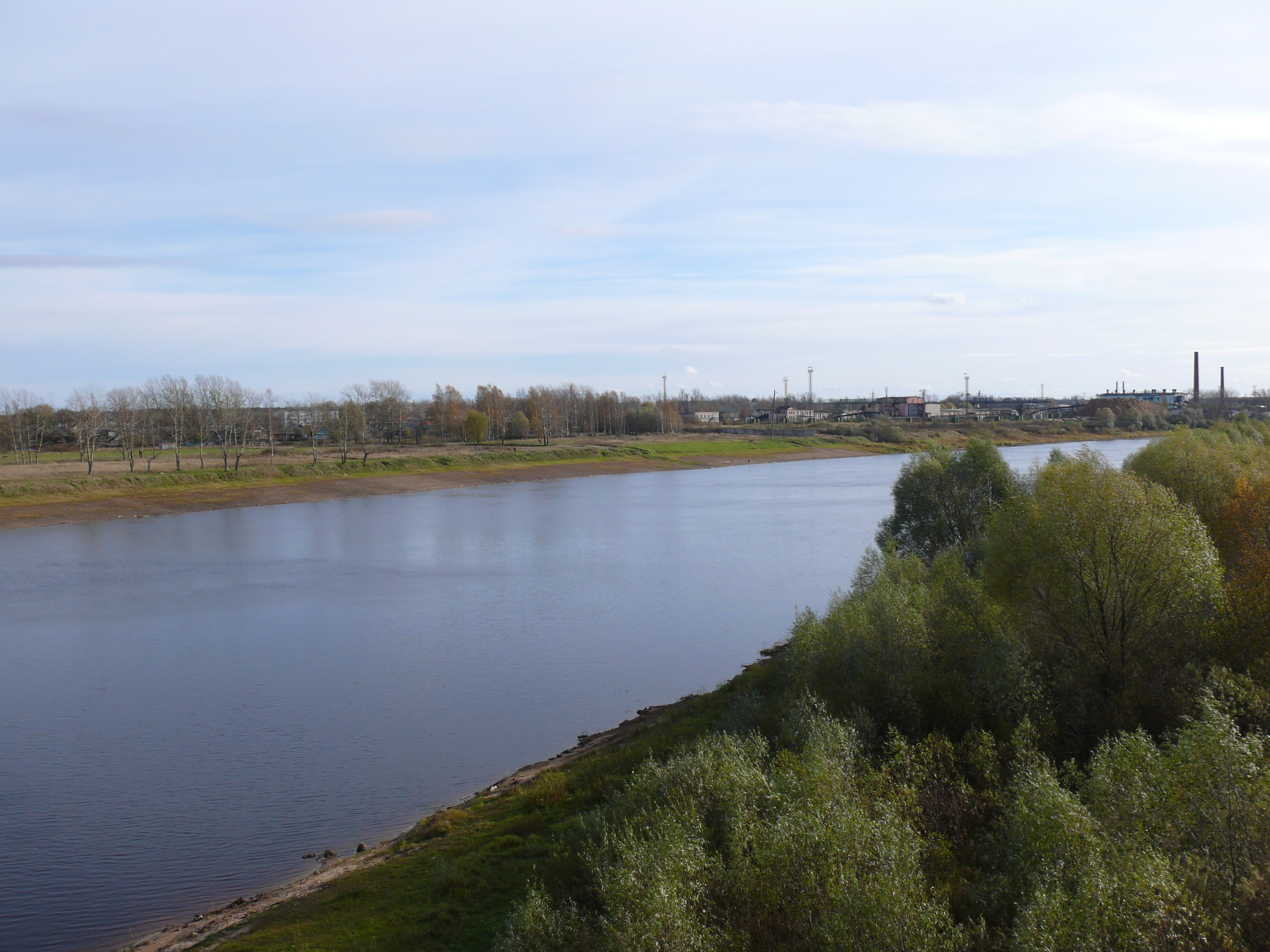
- The Lovat River and the Parfino Plywood Factory
- Interactive map of Parfino
- Location of Parfino Parfino (Novgorod Oblast)
- Coordinates: 57°57′N 31°38′E
- Country: Russia
- Federal subject: Novgorod Oblast
- Administrative district: Parfinsky District
- Founded: 1910
- Elevation: 27 m (89 ft)

Population (2010 Census)
  - Total: 7,492
  - Estimate (2025): 6,187 (−17.4%)

Administrative status
  - Capital of: Parfinsky District

Municipal status
  - Municipal district: Parfinsky Municipal District
  - Urban settlement: Parfinskoye Urban Settlement
  - Capital of: Parfinsky Municipal District, Parfinskoye Urban Settlement
- Time zone: UTC+3 (MSK)
- Postal code: 175130
- OKTMO ID: 49630151051

Parfino (Russian: Па́рфино) is an urban locality (a work settlement) and the administrative center of Parfinsky District of Novgorod Oblast, Russia, located along the Lovat River, 20 kilometers (12 mi) east of Staraya Russa. Municipally, it is incorporated as Parfinskoye Urban Settlement, the only urban settlement in the district. Population: 7,492 (2010 census); 8,446 (2002 census); 8,299 (1989 Soviet census).

== History ==
Historical affiliations

Grand Duchy of Moscow 1495–1547
Tsardom of Russia 1547–1721
Russian Empire 1721–1917
Russian Republic 1917
Soviet Russia 1917–1922
Soviet Union 1922–1991
Russian Federation 1991–present

The village of Parfino was first mentioned in chronicles in 1495. The Lovat River was a part of the Trade route from the Varangians to the Greeks, one of the oldest trading routes passing through Rus. The railway station opened between 1895 and 1897 also got the name of Parfino. In 1910, a construction of a plywood factory started between the village and the station of Parfino. Though formally the factory was built on the lands belonging to the village of Zhereslo, the factory settlement became known as the settlement of Parfino. It belonged to Starorussky Uyezd of Novgorod Governorate, and after 1927, to Starorussky District of Novgorod Okrug of Leningrad Oblast. On July 23, 1930, the okrugs were abolished, and the districts became directly subordinate to the oblast. In 1933, Parfino was granted an urban-type settlement status. The area was occupied by German troops between August 1941 and 1943. On July 5, 1944, Starorussky District was transferred to newly established Novgorod Oblast. On December 13, 1968 Parfinsky District was split off Starorussky District, and Parfino became the district center.

== Economy ==
=== Industry ===
Parfino is a typical single-industry settlement, where the major employer was Parfino Plywood Combinat (Парфинский фанерный комбинат), which underwent bankruptcy in the summer 2009.

=== Transportation ===
A railway which connects Bologoye and Pskov via Staraya Russa and Dno passes through Parfino.

Parfino is connected by roads with Staraya Russa and with M10 highway which connects Moscow and St. Petersburg.
