= Poddorsky District =

Poddorsky District Поддорский район (Russian)
- District
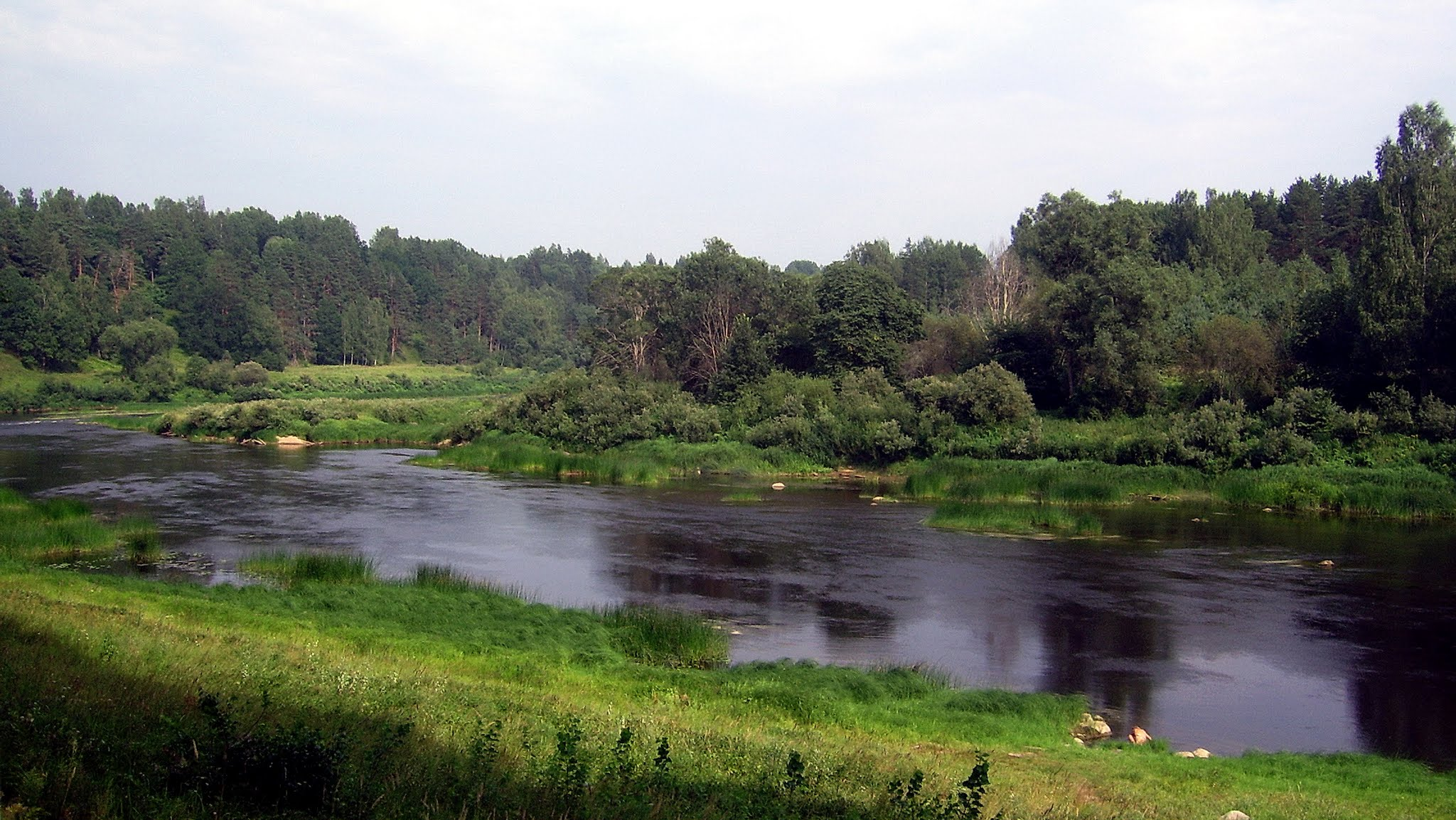
- Lovato River, Poddorsky District

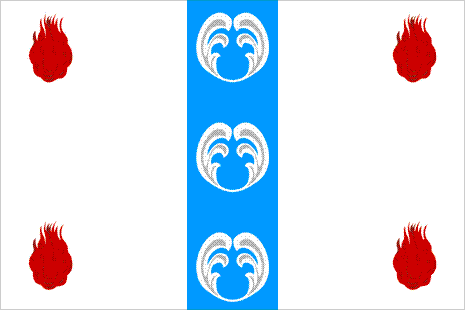
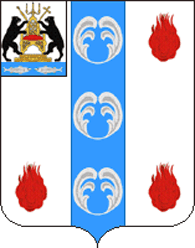
- Flag Coat of arms
- Location of Poddorsky District in Novgorod Oblast
- Coordinates: 57°28′N 31°07′E
- Country: Russia
- Federal subject: Novgorod Oblast
- Established: October 1, 1927
- Administrative center: Poddorye

Area
  - Total: 2,952 km^{2} (1,140 sq mi)

Population (2010 Census)
  - Total: 4,645
  - Density: 1.574/km^{2} (4.075/sq mi)
  - Urban: 0%
  - Rural: 100%

Administrative structure
  - Administrative divisions: 3 settlement
  - Inhabited localities: 155 rural localities

Municipal structure
  - Municipally incorporated as: Poddorsky Municipal District
  - Municipal divisions: 0 urban settlements, 3 rural settlements
- Time zone: UTC+3 (MSK)
- OKTMO ID: 49634000
- Website: http://адмподдорье.рф/

Poddorsky District (Russian: По́ддорский райо́н) is an administrative and municipal district (raion), one of the twenty-one in Novgorod Oblast, Russia. It is located in the southwest of the oblast and borders with Volotovsky District in the north, Starorussky District in the northeast, Maryovsky District in the east, Kholmsky District in the south, Bezhanitsky District of Pskov Oblast in the southwest, and with Dedovichsky District of Pskov Oblast in the northwest. The area of the district is 2,952 square kilometers (1,140 sq mi). Its administrative center is the rural locality (a selo) of Poddorye. District's population: 4,645 (2010 census); 5,610 (2002 Census); 6,820 (1989 Soviet census). The population of Poddorye accounts for 40.0% of the district's total population.

== Geography ==
All rivers in the district drain into the Lovat River, and the vast majority of them flow in the northeastern direction, towards Lake Ilmen. The Lovat crosses the southeastern part of the district. The biggest river in the northern part of the district is the Polist, a left tributary of the Lovat which shares with it a river delta. A major right tributary of the Polist within the district is the Porusya River. Another major tributary of the Lovat is the Redya, which flows through Poddorye. The southwestern part of the district is occupied by the Polist-Lovat Swamp System. The raised bog landscapes are protected by the Rdeysky Nature Reserve, which Poddorsky District shares with Kholmsky District.

== History ==
The area of the district in the 15th century was a part of Shelonskaya Pyatina of the Novgorod lands. Some of the villages, including the village of Peregino, have been known since the 15th century. The selo of Poddorye was first mentioned in 1809. In the course of the administrative reform carried out in 1708 by Peter the Great, the area was included into Ingermanland Governorate (known since 1710 as Saint Petersburg Governorate). In 1727, separate Novgorod Governorate was split off. Pereginskaya and Poddorskaya Volosts were a part of Starorussky Uyezd of Novgorod Viceroyalty (since 1796 of Novgorod Governorate). In 1824, Poddorskaya Volost was transformed into a military settlement and subordinated to the Defense Ministry. Later in the 19th century, it was transferred back to Starorussky Uyezd.

In August 1927, the governorates and uyezds were abolished. Poddorsky District, with the administrative center in the selo of Poddorye, was established within Novgorod Okrug of Leningrad Oblast effective October 1, 1927. It included parts of former Starorussky Uyezd. On July 23, 1930, the okrugs were abolished, and the districts were directly subordinated to the oblast. On September 20, 1931, Belebyolkovsky District was abolished and merged into Poddorsky District. On March 11, 1941, Belebyolkovsky District was re-established; its new territory included a part of Poddorsky District. In August 1941, Poddorsky District was occupied by German troops. Most of the district was liberated in February 1942, and the remaining part was liberated in February 1944. On July 5, 1944, Poddorsky District was transferred to newly established Novgorod Oblast. On March 31, 1945, the administrative center of the district was transferred to the selo of Peregino, but on December 19, 1949 it was transferred back to Poddorye. On July 22, 1961, Belebyolkovsky District was again abolished and merged into Poddorsky District; this time for good. On February 1, 1963, the district was abolished in the course of the Nikita Khrushchev's abortive administrative reform and merged into Kholmsky Rural District. On November 3, 1965, Poddorsky District was re-established.

=== Abolished districts ===
Effective October 1, 1927, Belebyolkovsky District with the administrative center in the selo of Belebyolka was also established as a part of Novgorod Okrug of Leningrad Oblast. On September 20, 1931, Belebyolkovsky District was abolished and merged into Poddorsky District. On March 11, 1941, the district was re-established; its new territory included parts of Poddorsky and Dedovichsky Districts. Between August 1941 and February 1944, the district was occupied by German troops. On July 5, 1944, Belebyolkovsky District was transferred to newly established Novgorod Oblast. On July 22, 1961, Belebyolkovsky District was abolished and merged into Poddorsky District.

== Economy ==
=== Industry ===
The biggest industrial enterprise in the district is the butter production factory in Poddorye. In 2011, it accounted for about 80% of all industrial output in the district. In addition, there are enterprises of timber industry and food industry.

=== Agriculture ===
Four large-scale farms and eighteen mid-scale farms operate in the district. They specialize in meat and milk production, crops growing, and potato growing.

=== Transportation ===
A road connecting Staraya Russa with Kholm crosses the district from north to south, passing through Poddorye. There are also local roads.

== Culture and recreation ==
The district contains one cultural heritage monument of federal significance and additionally seventy-one objects classified as cultural and historical heritage of local significance. The federal monument is the archaeological site Kurskoye.

Poddorye hosts the Poddorsky District Museum, which was founded in 1987 and displays collections of local interest. The museum is administered by the district administration.
