= Parfinsky District =

Parfinsky District Парфинский район (Russian)
- District
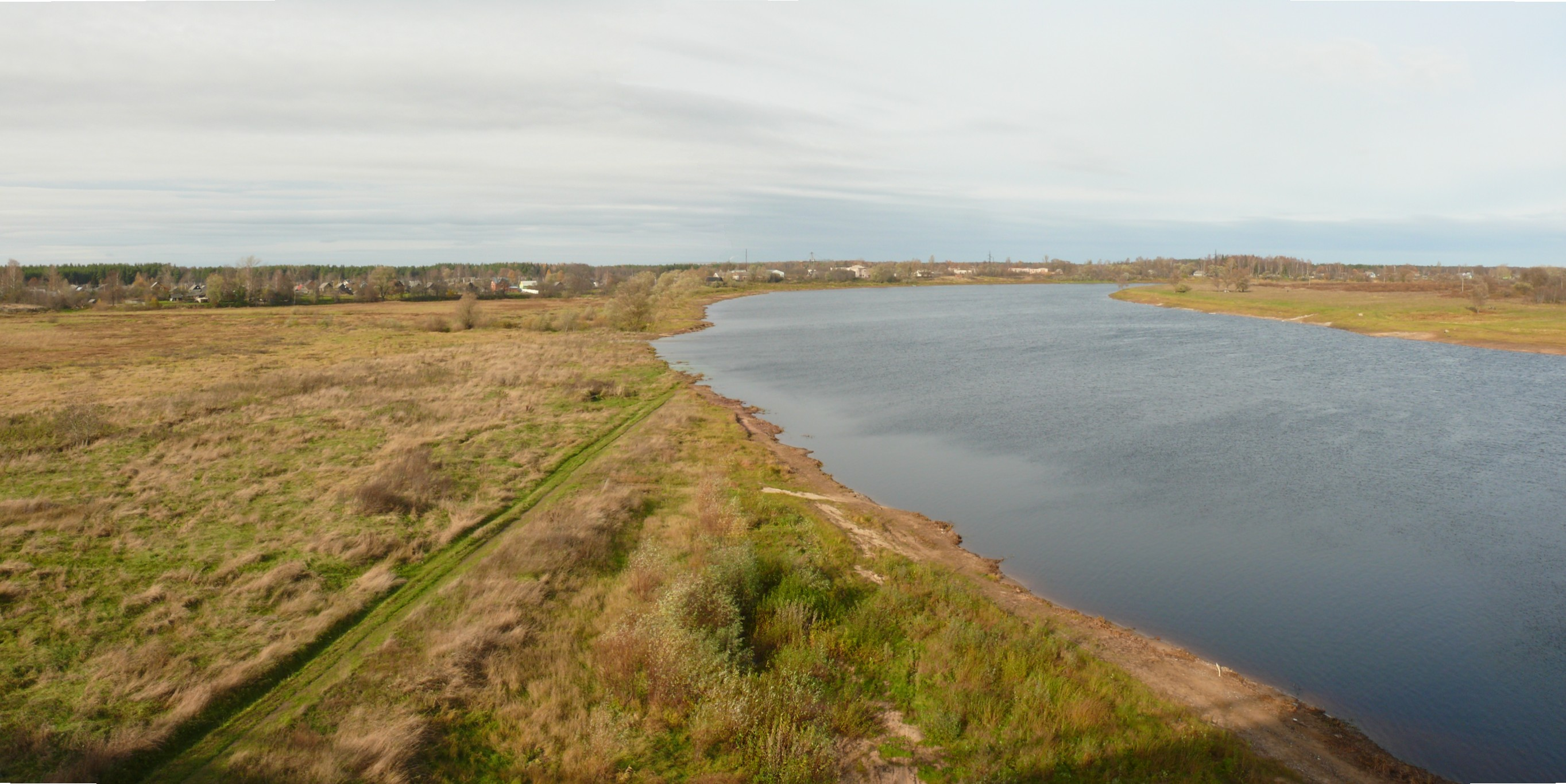
- The Lovat River near Parfino

- Coat of arms
- Location of Parfinsky District in Novgorod Oblast
- Coordinates: 57°57′N 31°38′E
- Country: Russia
- Federal subject: Novgorod Oblast
- Established: December 13, 1968
- Administrative center: Parfino

Area
  - Total: 1,591 km^{2} (614 sq mi)

Population (2010 Census)
  - Total: 14,395
  - Density: 9.048/km^{2} (23.43/sq mi)
  - Urban: 52.0%
  - Rural: 48.0%

Administrative structure
  - Administrative divisions: 1 Urban-type settlements, 2 Settlements
  - Inhabited localities: 1 urban-type settlements, 114 rural localities

Municipal structure
  - Municipally incorporated as: Parfinsky Municipal District
  - Municipal divisions: 1 urban settlements, 2 rural settlements
- Time zone: UTC+3 (MSK)
- OKTMO ID: 49630000
- Website: http://admparfino.ru/

Parfinsky District (Russian: Парфинский район) is an administrative and municipal district (raion), one of the twenty-one in Novgorod Oblast, Russia. It is located in the center of the oblast and borders with Krestetsky District in the north, Demyansky District in the southeast, and with Starorussky District in the southwest. The area of the district is 1,591 square kilometers (614 sq mi). Its administrative center is the urban locality (a work settlement) of Parfino. Population: 14,395 (2010 census); 16,485 (2002 Census); 17,650 (1989 Soviet census). The population of Parfino accounts for 52.0% of the total district's population.

== Geography ==
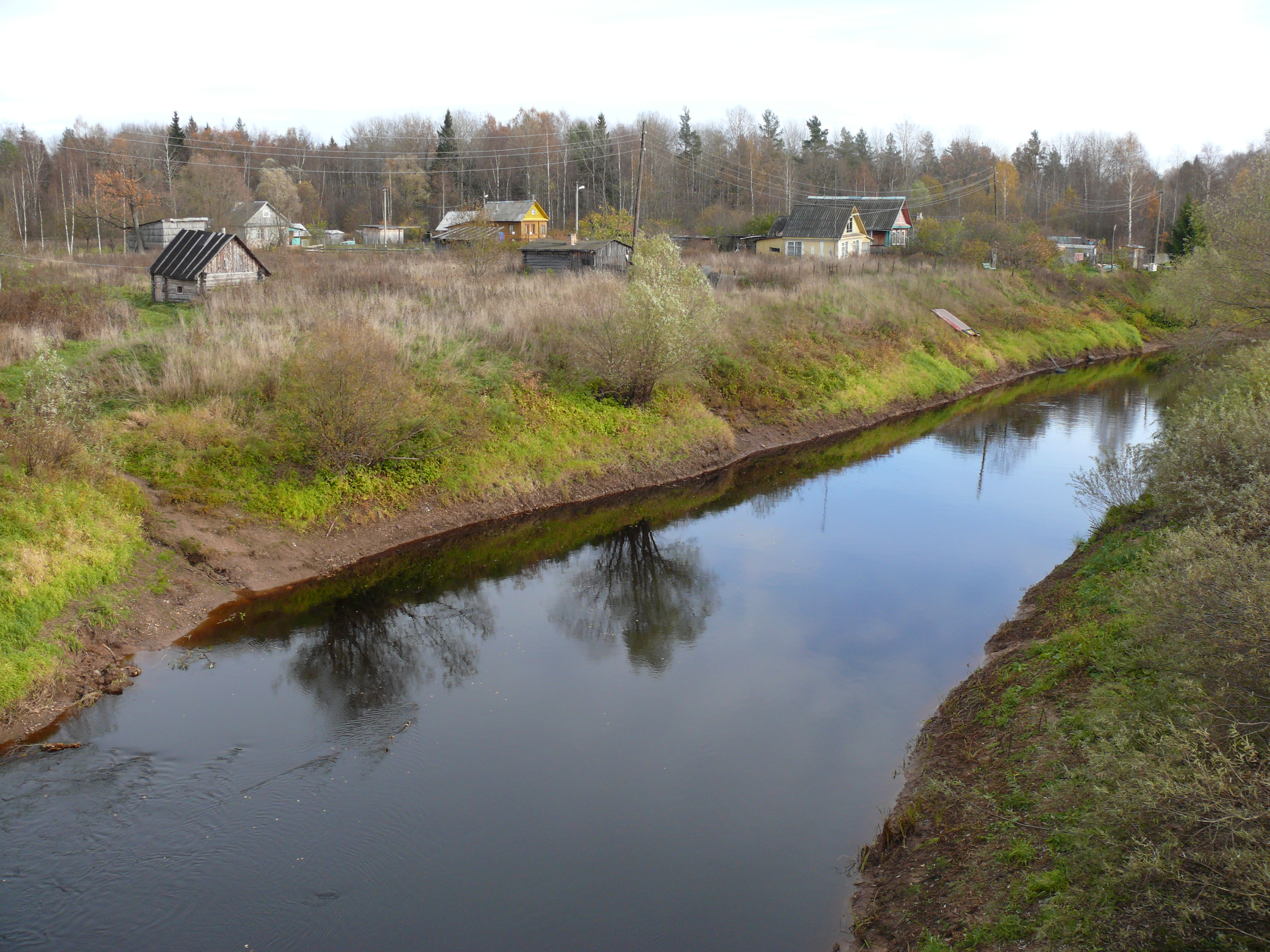
The Redya River in the village of Ivankovo

The district is located southeast of Lake Ilmen and a stretch of the lake shore belongs to it. The main rivers in the district are the Pola and the Lovat (with the Redya being its main left tributary), the tributaries of Lake Ilmen, which form a joint delta with the Polist. Another tributary of Lake Ilmen which has its mouth in the district is the Mayata. The whole area of the district lies in the basin of Lake Ilmen.

Forests occupy the area of 1,136 square kilometers (439 sq mi), 69% of which are broadleaf and mixed forests. There are about a hundred lakes in the district, with about a half of them located in the river delta of the Lovat.

== History ==
The Lovat River was a part of the trade route from the Varangians to the Greeks, one of the oldest trading routes passing through Rus'. Specifically, the village of Nalyuchi was mentioned in the chronicles in 1200. Many villages were first mentioned in 1495. The area was a part of the Novgorod Republic, and after the fall of Novgorod, it was annexed by the Grand Duchy of Moscow. In the course of the administrative reform carried out in 1708 by Peter the Great, the area was included into Ingermanland Governorate (known since 1710 as Saint Petersburg Governorate). In 1727, separate Novgorod Governorate was split off. The current territory of Parfinsky District was a part of Starorussky Uyezd. After the uyezds were abolished in 1927, the territory was split between Starorussky and Polskoy Districts which were a part of Novgorod Okrug of Leningrad Oblast. The administrative center of Polskoy District was in the settlement of Pola. On July 23, 1930, the okrugs were abolished, and the districts were directly subordinated to the oblast. On January 1, 1932, Polskoy District was abolished and merged into Lychkovsky District. On August 3, 1939, the district was re-established under the name of Polavsky District.

In 1910, a plywood factory was founded in what later became the settlement of Parfino. In 1933, Parfino was granted urban-type settlement status. The area was occupied by German troops between August 1941 and 1943. The battles over the Demyansk Pocket took place here. On July 5, 1944, Starorussky and Polavsky Districts were transferred to newly established Novgorod Oblast. In the early 1960s, after a series of reforms, Polavsky District was abolished and split between Demyansky and Starorussky Districts. On December 13, 1968, Parfinsky District was established by splitting it from Starorussky District. On December 23, 1968, additional territories from Starorussky District were appended to it.

== Economy ==
=== Industry ===
Timber industry is the main branch of industry in the district. In 2009, Parfino Plywood Factory, the major employer in the district, went bankrupt.

=== Agriculture ===
Agricultural areas in the district occupy 159 square kilometers (61 sq mi).

=== Transportation ===
A railway which connects Bologoye and Pskov via Staraya Russa crosses the district from east to west. The main stations within the district are Pola and Parfino.

Parfino is connected by roads with Staraya Russa and with M10 highway which connects Moscow and St. Petersburg.

The Lovat is navigable downstream of the settlement of Parfino, and Lake Ilmen is navigable as well; however, there is no passenger navigation.

== Culture and recreation ==
The district contains two cultural heritage monuments of federal significance and additionally eighty-one objects classified as cultural and historical heritage of local significance. Almost all of these are archaeological sites and graves of soldiers fallen in World War II. Both heritage objects of federal significance are archaeological sites.
