= Redya =

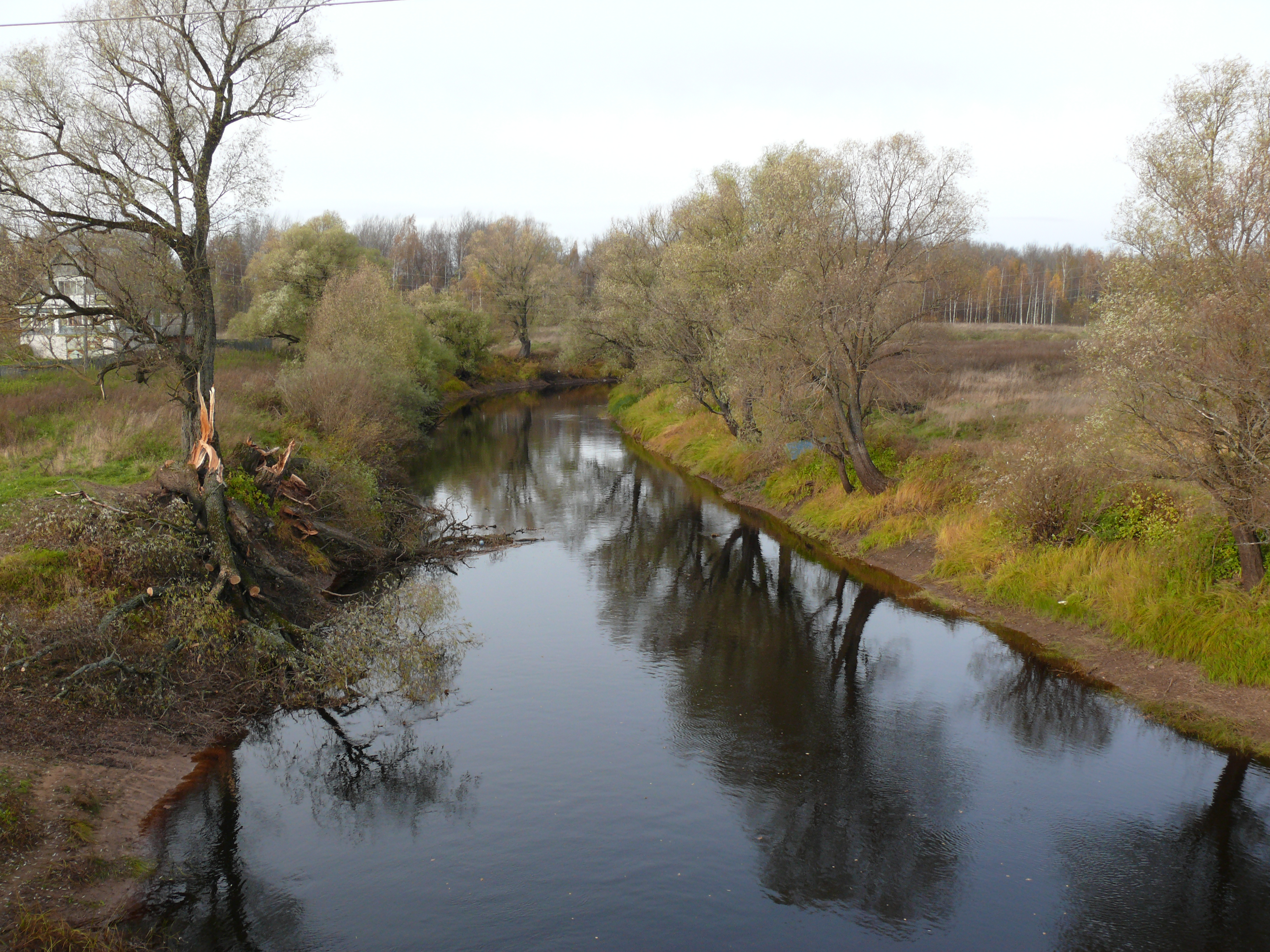
- The Redya in the village of Ivankovo, Parfinsky District
- Native name: Редья (Russian)

Location
- Country: Russia

Physical characteristics
- Mouth: Lovat
  - coordinates: 58°05′20″N 31°32′40″E
- Length: 146 km (91 mi)
- Basin size: 671 km^{2} (259 sq mi)

Basin features
- Progression: Lovat→ Lake Ilmen→ Volkhov→ Lake Ladoga→ Neva→ Gulf of Finland

The Redya (Russian: Редья) is a river in Kholmsky, Poddorsky, Starorussky, and Parfinsky Districts of Novgorod Oblast in Russia. It is a left tributary of the Lovat. It is 146 kilometres (91 mi) long, and the area of its basin 671 square kilometres (259 sq mi).

The source of the Redya is in Lake Rdeyskoye in Kholmsky District. The upper course of the river, including Lake Rdeyskoye, is located within Rdeysky Nature Reserve, which is a vast swampy unpopulated area. The Redya flows northeast. Several initial kilometers of its course are located in Kholmsky District, after which the Redya crosses over to Poddorsky District. The district administrative center, the selo of Poddorye, is located on the left bank of the Redya. Downstream of Poddorye, the Redya crosses into Starorussky District. In this area, the Redya is one of many sizeable rivers flowing northeast over the Ilmen Depression, towards Lake Ilmen. The course of the Redya is confined between the courses of the Lovat (east) and the Porusya (west). For approximately 20 kilometres (12 mi), the Redya forms the boundary between Starorussky and Parfinsky Districts. In its lower course, it departs from the boundary back into Starorussky District and joins the Lovat, forming a joint delta with the Lovat, the Pola, and the Polist.
