= Firovo =

Firovo Фирово
- Work settlement
- Interactive map of Firovo
- Location of Firovo Firovo (Tver Oblast)
- Coordinates: 57°28′57″N 33°42′06″E
- Country: Russia
- Federal subject: Tver Oblast
- Administrative district: Firovsky District
- railway station: 1902
- Urban-type settlement status since: 1947

Population (2010 Census)
  - Total: 2,433
  - Estimate (2021): 2,010 (−17.4%)

Administrative status
  - Capital of: Firovsky District

Municipal status
  - Municipal district: Firovsky Municipal District
  - Urban settlement: Firovskoye Urban Settlement
  - Capital of: Firovsky Municipal District, Firovskoye Urban Settlement
- Time zone: UTC+3 (MSK)
- Postal code: 172720
- OKTMO ID: 28657151051

Firovo (Russian: Фи́рово) is an urban-type settlement and the administrative center of Firovsky District of Tver Oblast, Russia. It is located on the right bank of the Granichnaya River. Population: 2,433 (2010 census); 2,837 (2002 census); 3,070 (1989 Soviet census).

== History ==
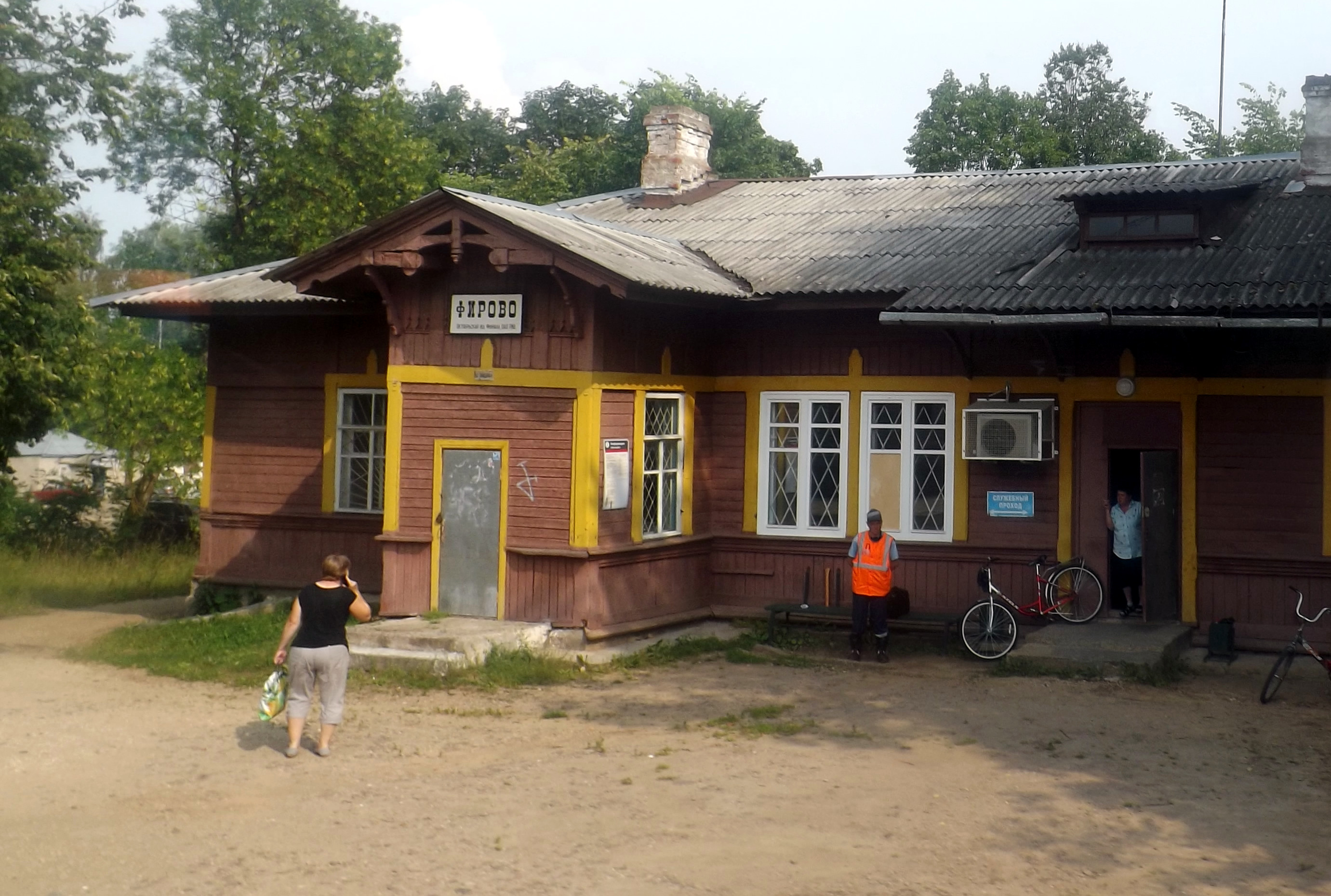
Firovo station

Firovo was founded in 1902 as a station on the Bologoye - Polotsk Railway. The station was built at equal distances from Bologoye and Ostashkov. The name was given after the village of Firovka, which existed in the area. The settlement of Firovo was the center of Firovskaya Volost of Valdaysky Uyezd, Novgorod Governorate. Effective October 1, 1927 Novgorod Governorate with its uyezds was abolished, and Rozhdestvensky District was established, with the administrative center in the selo of Rozhdestvo. It was a part of Borovichi Okrug of Leningrad Oblast. Firovo became a part of Rozhdestvensky District. On September 20, 1931, Rozhdestvensky District was abolished and merged into Bologovsky District of Leningrad Oblast.

On March 5, 1935 Kalinin Oblast was established. It included areas which formerly belonged to Moscow, Leningrad, and Western Oblasts. In particular, Firovsky District with the administrative center in Firovo was established. In 1947, Firovo was granted urban-type settlement status. In February 1963, during the abortive administrative reform by Nikita Khrushchev, Firovsky District was merged into Vyshnevolotsky District, but on April 6, 1972 it was re-established. In 1990, Kalinin Oblast was renamed Tver Oblast.

== Economy ==
=== Industry ===
There are enterprises of timber and food industries in Firovo.

=== Transportation ===
Firovo has a railway station on the railway connecting Bologoye and Velikiye Luki. There is infrequent passenger traffic. A railway connects Firovo with Velikooktyabrsky, but it is only open for cargo traffic.

Firovo is connected by a paved road with Vyshny Volochyok. The road also provides access to the M10 highway which connects Moscow and Saint Petersburg. There are also local roads.

== Culture and recreation ==
Firovo hosts a local museum.
