= Vypolzovo (air base) =

Former airport in Tver Oblast, Russia

Vypolzovo Bologoye-4
- Ozyorny, Tver Oblast in Russia

Site information
- Type: Air Base
- Owner: Ministry of Defence
- Operator: Russian Air Force

Location
- Shown within Tver Oblast Vypolzovo (Russia)
- Coordinates: 57°52′02″N 33°40′14″E

Site history
- In use: present

Airfield information
- Elevation: 10 metres (33 ft) AMSL

Vypolzovo is a former Russian Air Force airbase located near Ozyorny, Tver Oblast, Russia.

The base was home to the:

- 139th Guards Fighter Aviation Regiment PVO between 1948 and 1950 with the Yakovlev Yak-9.
- 760th Fighter Aviation Regiment between 1945 and 1946 with the Lavochkin La-7.
- 435th Fighter Aviation Regiment between 1945 and 1946 with the La-7.
- 145th Guards Fighter Aviation Regiment PVO between 1948 and 1950 with the La-7.
- 566th Transport Aviation Regiment between 1947 and 1958 with the Lisunov Li-2.
- 334th Transport Aviation Regiment between 1946 and 1948 with the Li-2.
- 147th Guards Fighter Aviation Regiment PVO between 1948 and 1952 with the Mikoyan-Gurevich MiG-15.
- 47th Independent Guards Reconnaissance Aviation Regiment between 1946 and 1947 with the Petlyakov Pe-2.
- 29th Independent Helicopter Squadron of the Strategic Rocket Forces between 1968 and 1997. It supported the 7th Guards Rocket Division.
