= Komkino, Tver Oblast =

Rural locality in Firovsky District, Tver Oblast, Russia

Coordinates: 57°40′26″N 33°25′37″E

Komkino (Russian: Кoмκино) is a rural locality in Firovsky District of Tver Oblast, Russia, located south of the town of Valday.

This small village of about forty houses is located on both sides of the Shlina River, by Lake Shlino. The water between Lake Shlino and the Shlina is regulated by a large dam, located at one end of the village. The dam was once a prime fishing location, but it has been closed off to the public for over ten years.

There is no plumbing in the village, and most houses are heated with wood-burning stoves. While the area has recently suffered some change through the transformation of certain private homes into summer dachas, the majority of residents live in Komkino year round and subsist on their livestock, which includes cows, sheep, chicken, and goats.

Komkino is also located in a forested region rich with berries (wild blackberries and raspberries, in particular) and mushrooms. Notable nearby landmarks include a summer youth camp and an Air Force Base.
