= Krasnomayskaya, Bryansk Oblast =

Krasnomayskaya Красномайская
- Village
- Location within Bryansk Oblast Location within Russia
- Coordinates: 52°56′N 33°47′E
- Country: Russia
- Region: Bryansk Oblast
- District: Pochepsky District
- Time zone: UTC+3:00

Krasnomayskaya (Russian: Красномайская) is a rural locality (a village) in Pochepsky District, Bryansk Oblast, Russia. The population was 13 as of 2010. There is 1 street.

== Geography ==
Krasnomayskaya is located 25 km east of Pochep (the district's administrative centre) by road. Moskali is the nearest rural locality.
