= Bologovsky District =

Bologovsky District Бологовский район (Russian)
- District
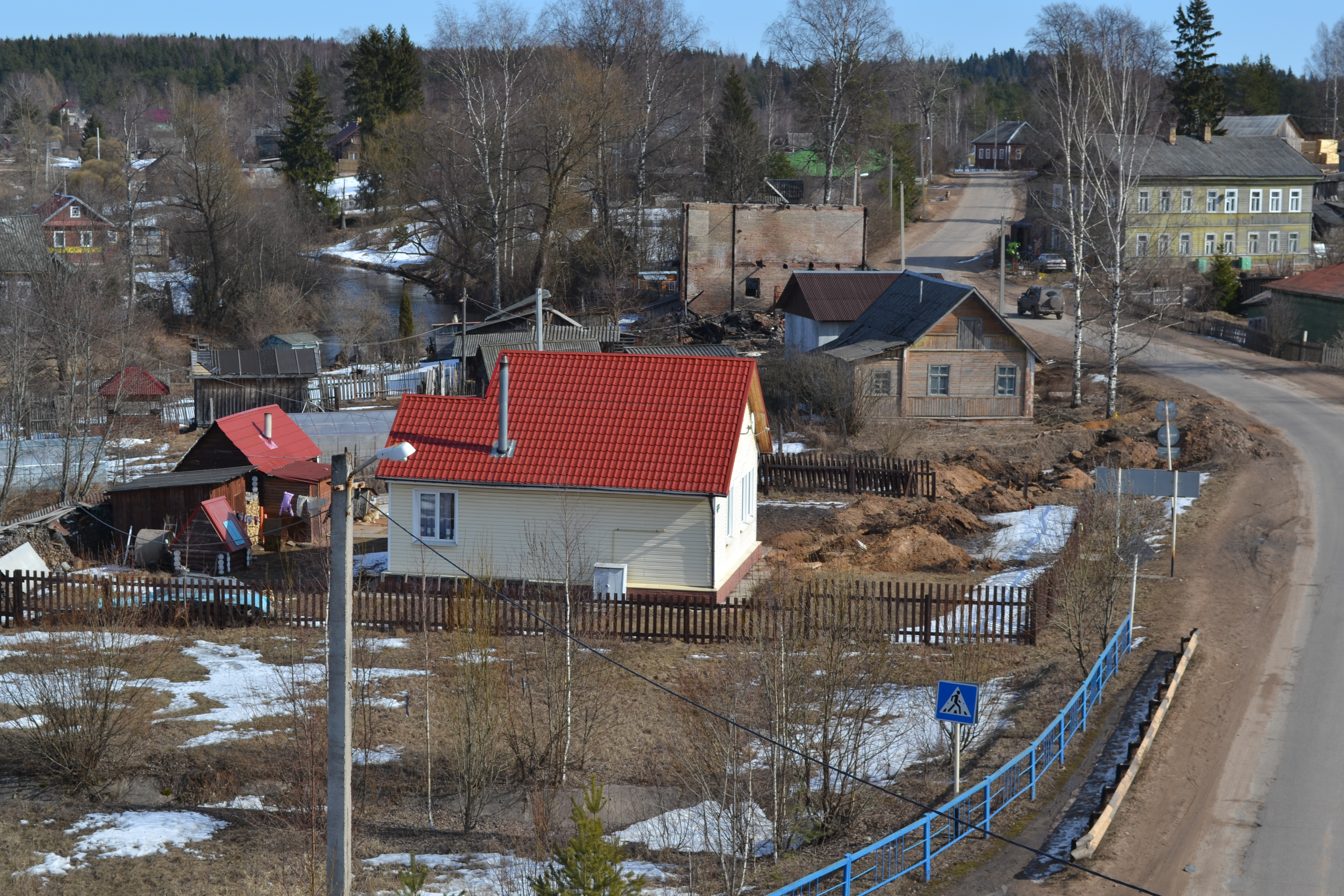
- Lykoshino, Bologovsky District

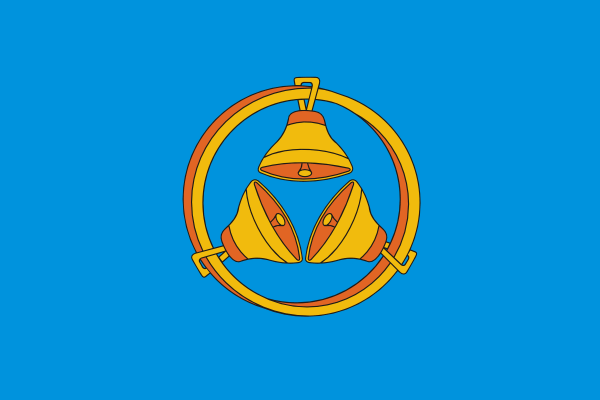
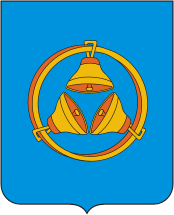
- Flag Coat of arms
- Location of Bologovsky District in Tver Oblast
- Coordinates: 57°52′N 34°03′E
- Country: Russia
- Federal subject: Tver Oblast
- Established: 1927
- Administrative center: Bologoye

Area
  - Total: 2,463.7 km^{2} (951.2 sq mi)

Population (2010 Census)
  - Total: 38,557
  - Density: 15.650/km^{2} (40.533/sq mi)
  - Urban: 68.3%
  - Rural: 31.7%

Administrative structure
  - Administrative divisions: 1 Urban settlements (towns), 1 Urban settlements (urban-type settlements), 9 Rural settlements
  - Inhabited localities: 1 cities/towns, 1 urban-type settlements, 159 rural localities

Municipal structure
  - Municipally incorporated as: Bologovsky Municipal District
  - Municipal divisions: 2 urban settlements, 9 rural settlements
- Time zone: UTC+3 (MSK)
- OKTMO ID: 28608000
- Website: http://rbologoe.ru/

Bologovsky District (Russian: Болого́вский райо́н) is an administrative and municipal district (raion), one of the thirty-six in Tver Oblast, Russia. It is located in the north of the oblast and borders with Borovichsky District of Novgorod Oblast in the north, Udomelsky District in the east, Vyshnevolotsky District in the southeast, Firovsky District and the urban-type settlement of Ozyorny in the south, Valdaysky District of Novgorod Oblast in the west, and with Okulovsky District, also of Novgorod Oblast, to the northwest. The area of the district is 2,463.7 square kilometers (951.2 sq mi). Its administrative center is the town of Bologoye. Population: 38,557 (2010 Census); 18,757 (2002 census); 32,790 (1989 Soviet census). The population of Bologoye accounts for 60.9% of the district's total population.

== Geography ==
The district is located in the eastern part of the Valdai Hills. The whole area of the district belongs to the drainage basin of the Msta River, a major tributary of Lake Ilmen, which, in its turn, belongs to the basin of the Baltic Sea. A stretch of the Msta makes a border between Bologovsky and Udomelsky Districts, and Msta also crosses the northeast corner of the district. The biggest tributary of the Msta within the district is the Berezayka River, with its tributary, the Valdayka River. The rivers in the south of the district drain into the Shlina River, a tributary of the Tsna River, also in the basin of the Msta. The Shlina crosses the southern part of the district.

The Valdai Hills are notable by its large lake district, of which a part belongs to Bologovsky District. The largest lakes within the district are Lake Piros and Lake Kaftino, which belong to the basin of the Berezayka. Much of the area of the district is covered by forest.

== History ==
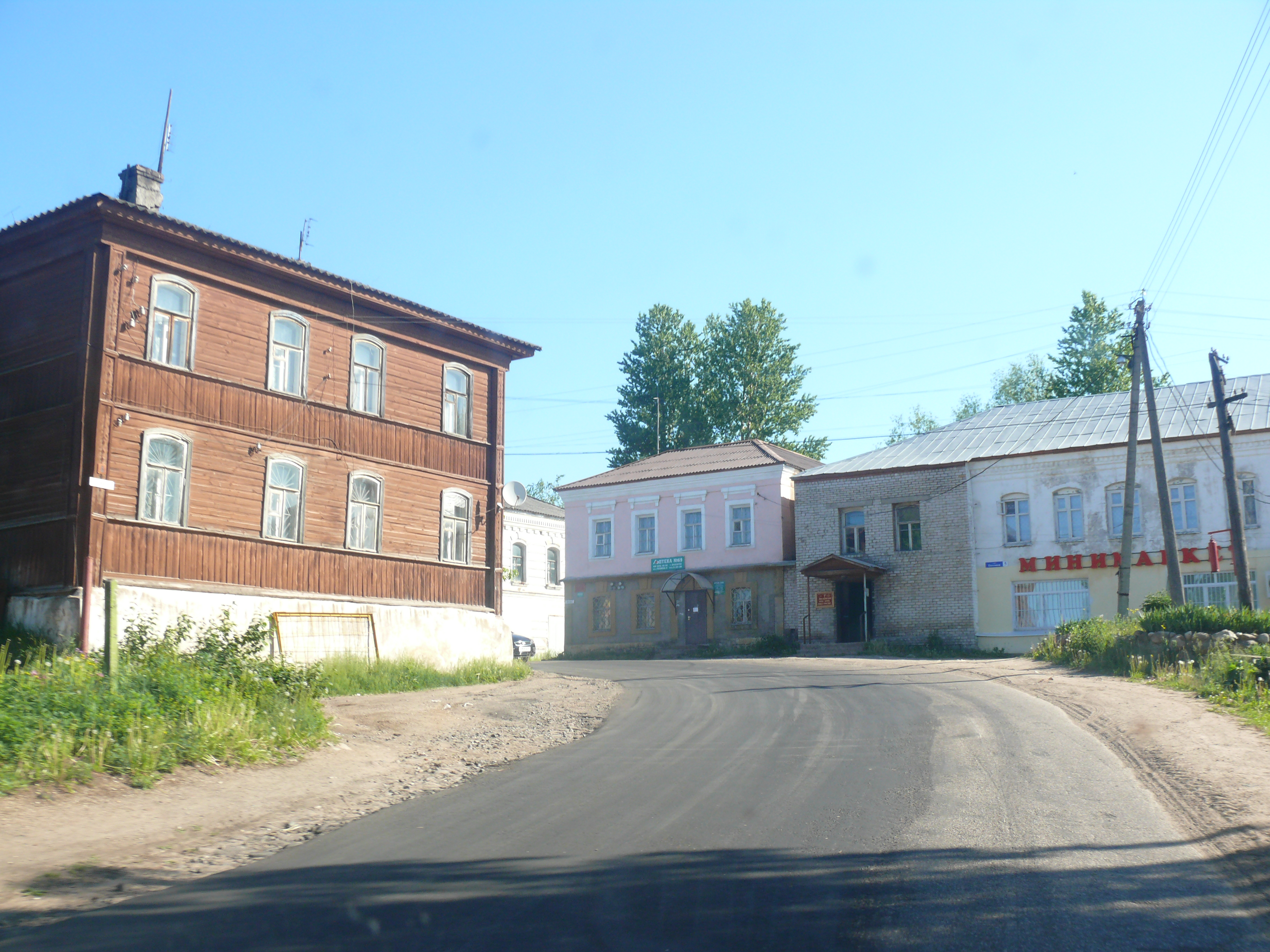
The settlement of Lykoshino

The area from the Middle Ages was dependent on Novgorod and in the 15th century was a part of Derevskaya Pyatina of Novgorod. In the course of the administrative reform carried out in 1708 by Peter the Great, it was included into Ingermanland Governorate (known since 1710 as Saint Petersburg Governorate). In 1727, separate Novgorod Governorate was split off. In 1770, it became a part of Valdaysky Uyezd of Novgorod Viceroyalty. In 1796, the viceroyalty was transformed into Novgorod Governorate. The area was located along the road connecting Moscow and St. Petersburg; in 1851, the railway between Moscow and Saint Petersburg was opened, and Bologoye started to develop as a railway station. On June 3, 1917 Bologoye was granted a town status. Between April 1, 1919 and October 1920, the uyezd center was transferred from Valday to Bologoye, but soon after it was moved back to Valday again.

In August 1927, the governorates and uyezds were abolished. Bologovsky District, with the administrative center in the town of Bologoye, was established within Borovichi Okrug of Leningrad Oblast effective October 1, 1927. It included parts of former Valdaysky Uyezd. On July 23, 1930, the okrugs were abolished, and the districts were directly subordinated to the oblast. On January 29, 1935 Bologovsky District was transferred to newly established Kalinin Oblast. In February 1963, during the abortive administrative reform by Nikita Khrushchev, Udomelsky District was merged into Bologovsky District, but in January 1965 it was re-established. In 1990, Kalinin Oblast was renamed Tver Oblast.

In 1938, Berezayka, and in 1939, Kuzhenkino and Vypolzovo were granted urban-type settlement status. In 2005, Vypolzovo and Berezayka were downgraded to the status of rural localities.

Effective October 1, 1927 Uglovsky District was established as well, with the administrative center in the railway station of Uglovka. It was a part of Borovichi Okrug of Leningrad Oblast. On January 1, 1932, Uglovsky District was abolished and split between Borovichsky, Okulovsky, and Bologovsky Districts.

The district was the location for the 2023 Wagner Group plane crash. According to the Russian emergency ministry, a plane en route from Moscow to St. Petersburg crashed near the settlement of Kuzhenkino on 23 August 2023. The flight reportedly contained 10 passengers, among them Russian army officer and alleged Wagner Group co-founder Dmitry Utkin and Wagner Group leader Yevgeny Prigozhin, who led a mutiny in Russia just 2 months prior.

== Economy ==
=== Industry ===
The industry of the district mainly serves the railways. Additionally, there are a pipe production factory, a glass-making factory, a metal production plant, as well as enterprises of construction and food industries.

=== Agriculture ===
The main agricultural specialization in the district is cattle breeding with meat and milk production.

=== Transportation ===
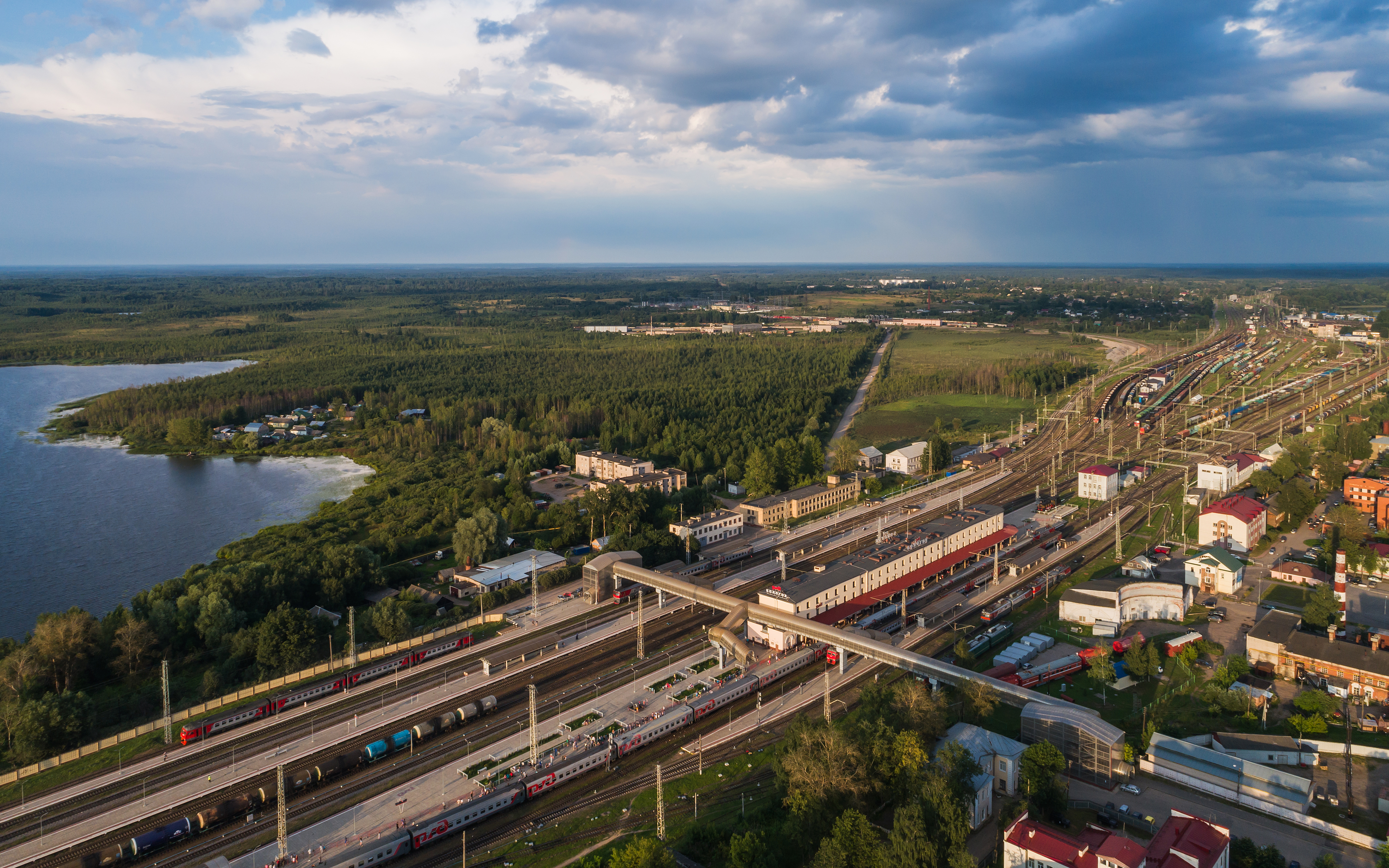
Bologoye railway station.

Bologoye is a major railway hub, where four railway lines cross: One connects Moscow and Saint Petersburg, and three more connect Bologoye with Rybinsk via Bezhetsk and Sonkovo, with Pskov via Valday and Staraya Russa, and with Velikiye Luki via Andreapol. There is passenger traffic along all these lines. The principal stations (all on the Moscow – Saint Petersburg Railway) are Bologoye, Berezayka, and Lykoshino.

The M10 highway, which connects Moscow and St. Petersburg, crosses the district from southeast to northwest, passing just north of the urban-type settlement of Kuzhenkino. Bologoye has access to this road. There are local roads as well.

== Culture and recreation ==
The district contains six cultural heritage monuments of federal significance and thirty-three cultural and historical heritage objects of local significance. The federal monuments are the wooden Transfiguration Church in the village of Beryozovy Ryadok, built in the first half of the 19th century, and the ensemble of the Kemtsy Estate in the selo of Kemtsy.

Bologoye hosts the Nikolay Dubravitsky Bologoye District Museum, which specializes in the history of the district.
