= Ozyorny, Tver Oblast =

Closed urban-type settlement in Tver Oblast, Russia

Ozyorny Озёрный
- Urban-type settlement
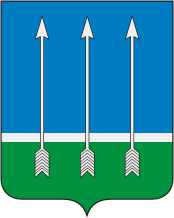
- Flag Coat of arms
- Interactive map of Ozyorny
- Location of Ozyorny Ozyorny (Tver Oblast)
- Coordinates: 57°51′39″N 33°40′32″E
- Country: Russia
- Federal subject: Tver Oblast
- Founded: 1972
- Urban-type settlement status since: 1992

Population (2010 Census)
  - Total: 10,882
  - Estimate (2021): 9,951 (−8.6%)

Administrative status
  - Subordinated to: Ozyorny Okrug
  - Capital of: Ozyorny Okrug

Municipal status
  - Urban okrug: Ozyorny Urban Okrug
  - Capital of: Ozyorny Urban Okrug
- Time zone: UTC+3 (MSK)
- Postal code: 171090
- OKTMO ID: 28753000051
- Website: www.ozerny.ru

Ozyorny (Russian: Озёрный), formerly known as Bologoye-4 (Бологое-4), is a closed urban locality (an urban-type settlement) in Tver Oblast, Russia. Population: 10,882 (2010 census); 10,689 (2002 census).

== History ==
The settlement was founded in the 1930s as a military unit serving Vypolzovo (air base) (the name of the airfield was taken from the nearby settlement of Vypolzovo). In the 1960s, the 7th Guards Rocket Division, operating strategic missiles, was relocated to the settlement and became the major employer. The settlement was known as Bologoye-4 since. In 1992 the urban-type settlement was renamed Ozyorny and officially was granted a status of a closed urban locality.

== Administrative and municipal status ==
Within the framework of administrative divisions, it is incorporated as Ozyorny Okrug—an administrative unit with the status equal to that of the districts. As a municipal division, Ozyorny Okrug is incorporated as Ozyorny Urban Okrug.
