= Bologoye, Tver Oblast =

Town in Tver Oblast, Russia

Bologoye Бологое
- Town
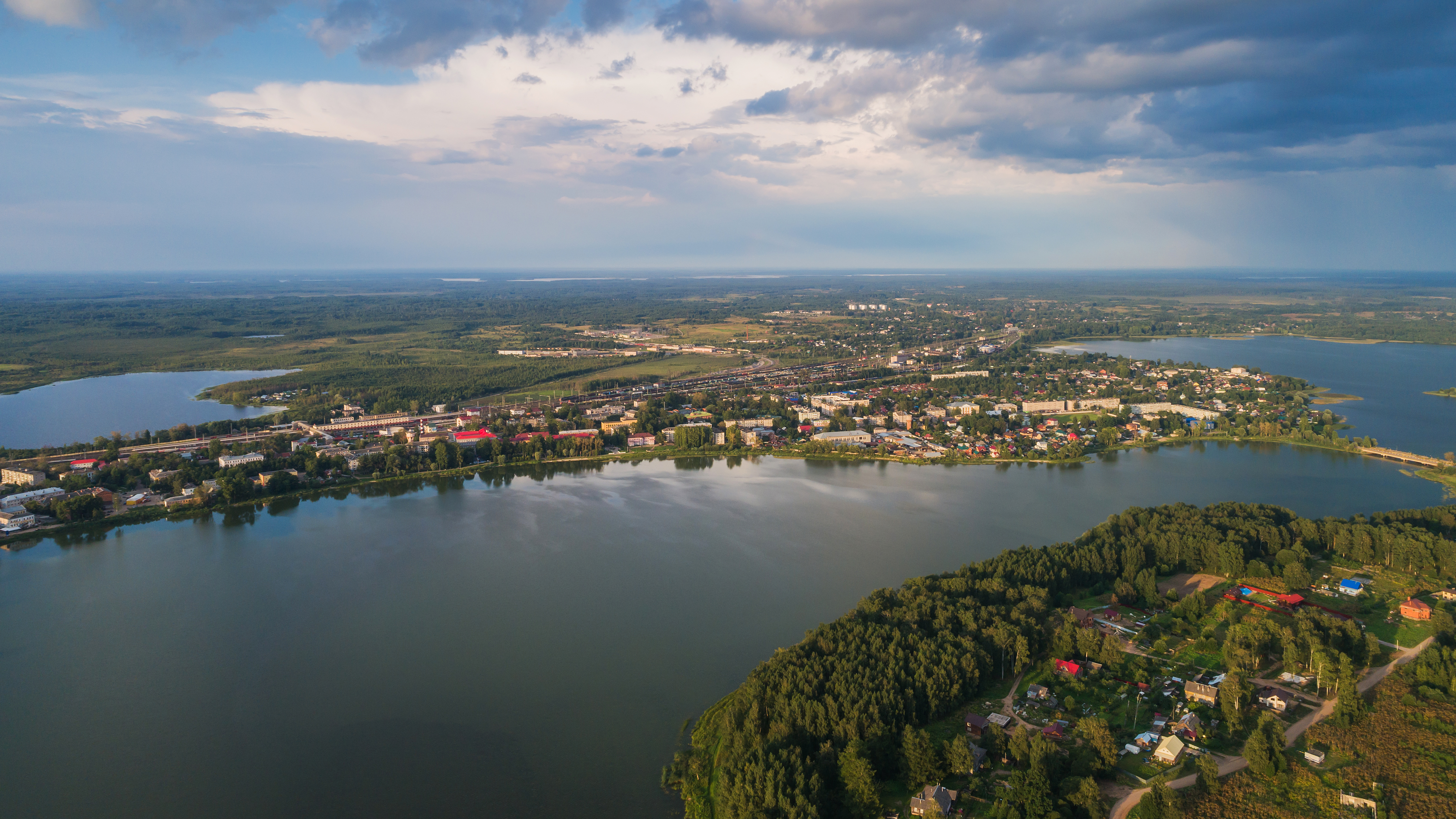
- Aerial view of Bologoye

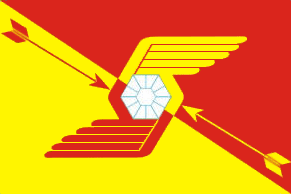
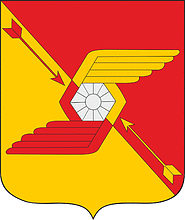
- Flag Coat of arms
- Interactive map of Bologoye
- Location of Bologoye Bologoye (Tver Oblast)
- Coordinates: 57°53′N 34°03′E
- Country: Russia
- Federal subject: Tver Oblast
- Administrative district: Bologovsky District
- Urban settlementSelsoviet: Bologoye
- First mentioned: 1495
- Elevation: 175 m (574 ft)

Population (2010 Census)
  - Total: 23,494
  - Estimate (2025): 19,310 (−17.8%)

Administrative status
  - Capital of: Bologovsky District, Bologoye Urban Settlement

Municipal status
  - Municipal district: Bologovsky Municipal District
  - Urban settlement: Bologoye Urban Settlement
  - Capital of: Bologovsky Municipal District, Bologoye Urban Settlement
- Time zone: UTC+3 (MSK)
- Postal codes: 171070–171072, 171075–171076, 171080–171081
- OKTMO ID: 28608101001
- Website: www.bologoe-gorod.ru

Bologoye (Russian: Болого́е) is a town and the administrative center of Bologovsky District in Tver Oblast, Russia, as well as a major railway hub. It is located approximately halfway between Moscow and St. Petersburg on the railway route connecting the two cities. Population: 23,494 (2010 census); 26,612 (2002 census); 35,926 (1989 Soviet census).

== Etymology ==
The name of the town derives from the name of nearby Lake Bologoye.

== History ==
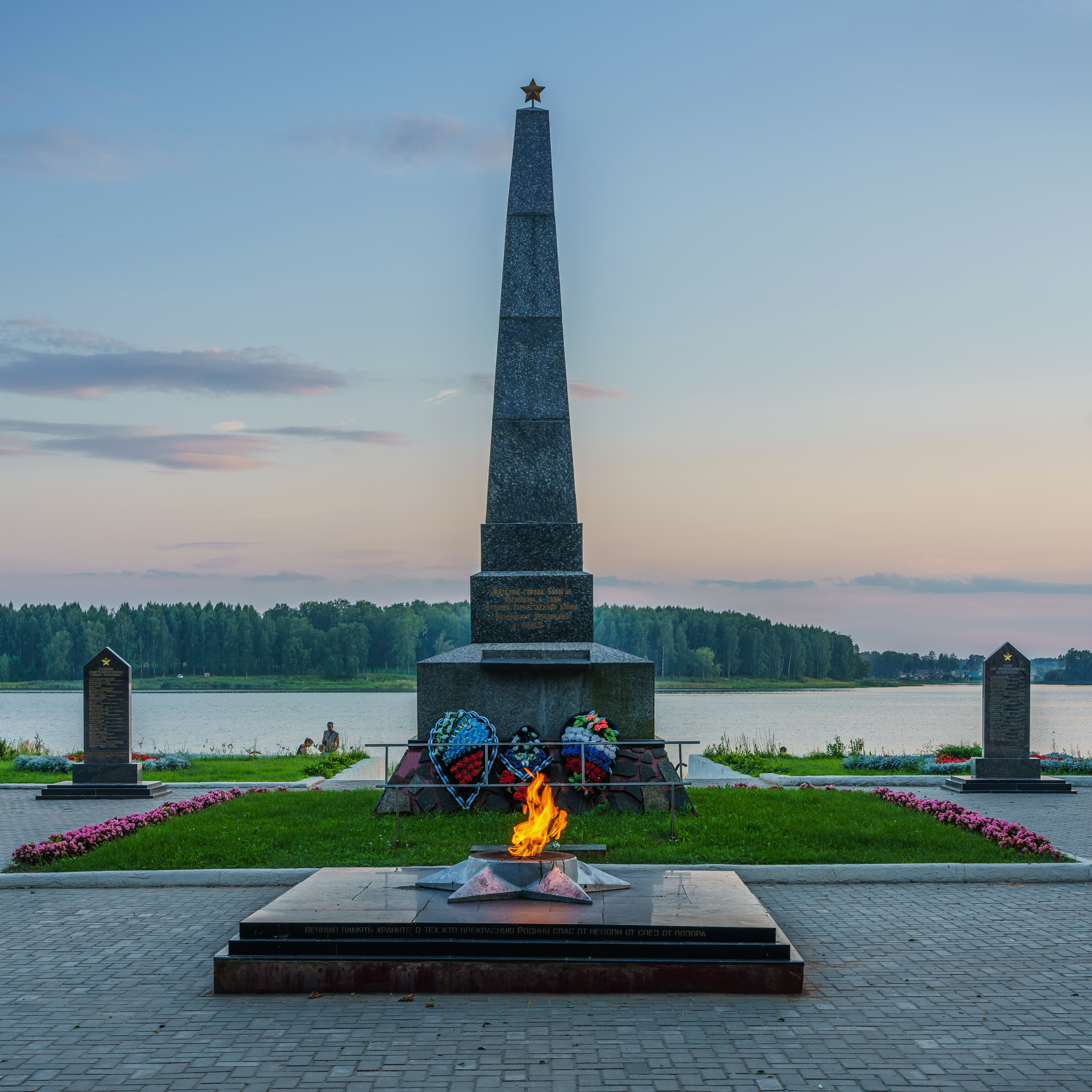
Great Patriotic War memorial at Lake Bologoye

The first mention of Bologoye in historic records dates back to 1495, which is considered its year of foundation. In the course of the administrative reform carried out in 1708 by Peter the Great, Bologoye was included into the Ingermanland Governorate (known since 1710 as the St. Petersburg Governorate). In 1727, a separate Novgorod Governorate was split off. In 1770, it became a part of Valdaysky Uyezd of Novgorod Viceroyalty. In 1796, the viceroyalty was transformed into Novgorod Governorate.

In 1851, Bologoye became a station of the Moscow – Saint Petersburg Railway. In the second half of the 19th century, the Rybinsk–Pskov–Vindava railway passed through Bologoye, turning it into a large railway junction. Railway-related industries have contributed significantly to the town's growth.

On June 3, 1917, Bologoye was granted town status. Between April 1, 1919 and October 1920, the administrative center of the uyezd was transferred from Valday to Bologoye, but soon after it was moved back to Valday.

In August 1927, the governorates and uyezds were abolished. Bologovsky District, with the administrative center in Bologoye, was established within Borovichi Okrug of Leningrad Oblast effective October 1, 1927. It included parts of former Valdaysky and Borovichsky Uyezds. On July 23, 1930, the okrugs were abolished and the districts were directly subordinated to the oblast. On January 29, 1935, Bologovsky District was transferred to newly established Kalinin Oblast. In 1990, Kalinin Oblast was renamed Tver Oblast.

On November 27, 2009, the town was the site of a derailment of an express train on the Moscow–St. Petersburg railway.

== Administrative and municipal status ==
Within the framework of administrative divisions, Bologoye serves as the administrative center of Bologovsky District. As an administrative division, it is, together with ten rural localities, incorporated within Bologovsky District as Bologoye Urban Settlement. As a municipal division, this administrative unit also has urban settlement status and is a part of Bologovsky Municipal District.

== Culture and recreation ==
Bologoye hosts the Nikolay Dubravitsky Bologoye District Museum which specializes in the history of Bologovsky District.

== Economy ==
=== Industry ===
The industry of Bologoye mainly serves the railways. Additionally, there are a pipe production factory, a glass-making factory, a metal production plant, as well as enterprises of construction and food industries.

=== Transportation ===
Bologoye is a major railway hub, where four railway lines cross. One connects Moscow and St. Petersburg, while the other three connect the town with Rybinsk via Bezhetsk and Sonkovo, with Pskov via Valday and Staraya Russa, and with Velikiye Luki via Andreapol. There is passenger traffic along all these lines.

Bologoye has access to the M10 Highway, which connects Moscow and St. Petersburg. There are local roads as well.

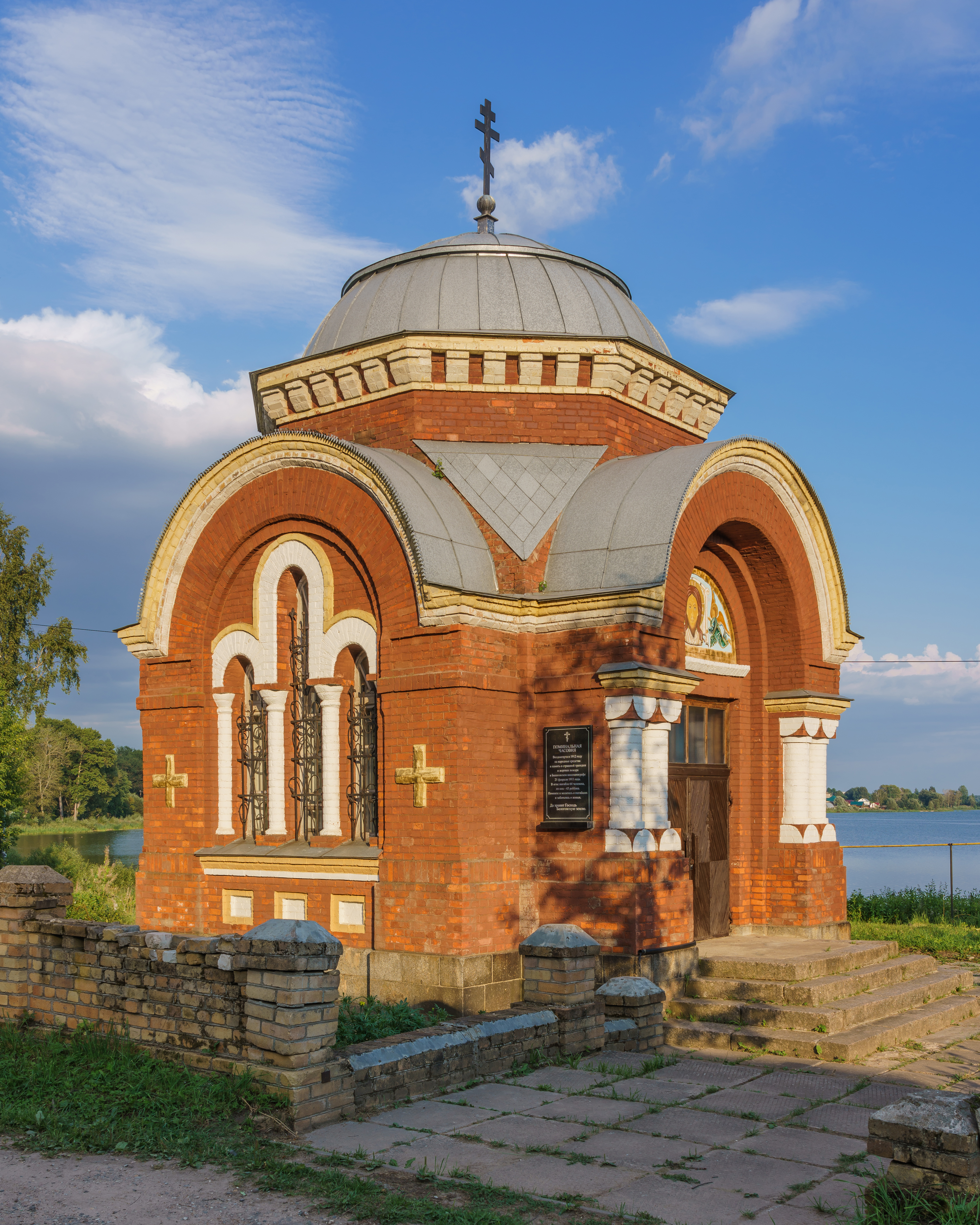
Memorial chapel in Bologoye.

== Climate ==
Climate data for Bologoye
Month	Jan	Feb	Mar	Apr	May	Jun	Jul	Aug	Sep	Oct	Nov	Dec	Year
Record high °C (°F)	8.3 (46.9)	9.2 (48.6)	17.8 (64.0)	26.3 (79.3)	31.4 (88.5)	34.9 (94.8)	35.7 (96.3)	35.8 (96.4)	30.5 (86.9)	23.7 (74.7)	12.6 (54.7)	9.7 (49.5)	35.8 (96.4)
Mean daily maximum °C (°F)	−4.5 (23.9)	−3.5 (25.7)	2.1 (35.8)	10.1 (50.2)	17.2 (63.0)	21.0 (69.8)	23.3 (73.9)	21.2 (70.2)	15.3 (59.5)	7.7 (45.9)	0.8 (33.4)	−2.9 (26.8)	9.0 (48.2)
Daily mean °C (°F)	−7.0 (19.4)	−6.8 (19.8)	−2.0 (28.4)	5.1 (41.2)	11.6 (52.9)	15.7 (60.3)	18.0 (64.4)	16.0 (60.8)	10.7 (51.3)	4.6 (40.3)	−1.2 (29.8)	−5.0 (23.0)	5.0 (41.0)
Mean daily minimum °C (°F)	−9.8 (14.4)	−10.1 (13.8)	−5.9 (21.4)	0.4 (32.7)	6.1 (43.0)	10.4 (50.7)	13.0 (55.4)	11.4 (52.5)	6.8 (44.2)	1.9 (35.4)	−3.3 (26.1)	−7.4 (18.7)	1.1 (34.0)
Record low °C (°F)	−40.0 (−40.0)	−36.1 (−33.0)	−32.2 (−26.0)	−16.9 (1.6)	−6.0 (21.2)	−1.1 (30.0)	0.9 (33.6)	−2.2 (28.0)	−6.1 (21.0)	−15.2 (4.6)	−27.9 (−18.2)	−43.4 (−46.1)	−43.4 (−46.1)
Average precipitation mm (inches)	46 (1.8)	33 (1.3)	35 (1.4)	32 (1.3)	56 (2.2)	78 (3.1)	83 (3.3)	83 (3.3)	62 (2.4)	63 (2.5)	51 (2.0)	51 (2.0)	673 (26.5)
Source: Pogodaiklimat.ru

== Sources ==
- Законодательное Собрание Тверской области. Закон №34-ЗО от 17 апреля 2006 г. «Об административно-территориальном устройстве Тверской области», в ред. Закона №66-ЗО от 1 октября 2014 г. «О внесении изменения в статью 18 Закона Тверской области "Об административно-территориальном устройстве Тверской области"». Вступил в силу со дня официального опубликования. Опубликован: "Тверские ведомости", №17 (специальный выпуск), 19 апреля 2006 г. (Legislative Assembly of Tver Oblast. Law #34-ZO of April 17, 2006 On the Administrative-Territorial Structure of Tver Oblast, as amended by the Law #66-ZO of October 1, 2014 On Amending Article 18 of the Law of Tver Oblast "On the Administrative-Territorial Structure of Tver Oblast". Effective as of the official publication date.).
- Законодательное Собрание Тверской области. Закон №20-ЗО от 28 февраля 2005 г. «Об установлении границ муниципальных образований, входящих в состав территории муниципального образования Тверской области "Бологовский район", и наделении их статусом городского, сельского поселения», в ред. Закона №57-ЗО от 13 июля 2009 г. «О внесении изменений в Приложение №1 к Закону Тверской области "Об установлении границ муниципальных образований, входящих в состав территории муниципального образования Тверской области "Бологовский район", и наделении их статусом городского, сельского поселения"». Вступил в силу со дня официального опубликования. Опубликован: "Тверские ведомости", №10, 11–17 марта 2005 г. (Legislative Assembly of Tver Oblast. Law #20-ZO of February 28, 2005 On Establishing the Borders of the Municipal Formations Comprised by the Territory of the Municipal Formation of "Bologovsky District" and on Granting Them the Status of Urban and Rural Settlements, as amended by the Law #57-ZO of July 13, 2009 On Amending Appendix 1 of the Law of Tver Oblast "On Establishing the Borders of the Municipal Formations Comprised by the Territory of the Municipal Formation of "Bologovsky District" and on Granting Them the Status of Urban and Rural Settlements". Effective as of the day of the official publication.).
- Законодательное Собрание Тверской области. Закон №4-ЗО от 18 января 2005 г. «Об установлении границ муниципальных образований Тверской области и наделении их статусом городских округов, муниципальных районов», в ред. Закона №65-ЗО от 24 июля 2012 г. «О внесении изменения в статью 2 Закона Тверской области "Об установлении границ муниципальных образований Тверской области и наделении их статусом городских округов, муниципальных районов"». Вступил в силу через десять дней после официального опубликования. Опубликован: "Тверские ведомости", №3, 21–27 января 2005 г. (Legislative Assembly of Tver Oblast. Law #4-ZO of January 18, 2005 On Establishing the Borders of the Municipal Formations of Tver Oblast and on Granting Them the Status of Urban Okrugs, Municipal Districts, as amended by the Law #65-ZO of July 24, 2012 On Amending Article 2 of the Law of Tver Oblast "On Establishing the Borders of the Municipal Formations of Tver Oblast and on Granting Them the Status of Urban Okrugs, Municipal Districts". Effective as of the day which is ten days after the official publication.).
- Снытко, О. В.; et al. (2009). С. Д. Трифонов; Т. Б. Чуйкова; Л. В. Федина; А. Э. Дубоносова (eds.). Административно-территориальное деление Новгородской губернии и области 1727-1995 гг. Справочник. [Administrative-Territorial Division of Novgorod Governorate and Oblast in 1727–1995. A Reference.] (PDF) (in Russian). Saint Petersburg.
