= Bakunin (surname) =

Bakunin (Russian: Баку́нин; masculine) or Bakunina (Баку́нина; feminine) is a Russian last name associated with the ancient Russian noble Bakunin family.

There are two theories regarding the origins of this last name. According to the first one, it is a variety of the last name Abakumov, which is derived from a patronymic, itself derived from various forms of the Christian male first name Avvakum. However, it is also possible that this last name is related to the last name Bakulin, both of which derive from dialectal Russian words "бакуня" (bakunya) and "бакуля" (bakulya), meaning, depending on the dialect, chatterbox, talkative person or agile, business-like person.

== Surname ==
- Mikhail Bakunin (1814–1876), Russian revolutionary anarchist
- Alexey Bakunin (b. 1970), retired Russian association football player
- Fyodor Bakunin (1898–1984), Soviet general
- Maria Bakunin (1873–1960), Russian-born Italian chemist and biologist
- Tatyana Aleksandrovna Bakunina (1815–1871)
- Tatyana Alekseevna Bakunina (1904–1995)
- Varvara Bakunina (1773–1840)
- Yekaterina Bakunina (1810–1894), Russian nurse during the Crimean War, who contributed to the foundation of nursing in Russia

=== Fictional characters ===
- Herbert Bakunin, a character in Brave New World by Aldous Huxley
- Mikhail Bakunin, a character in the American TV series Lost

== Other ==
- Bakunin (biography), a 1937 biography of the anarchist by E. H. Carr

== See also ==
- Bakunino, several rural localities in Russia
