= Bakunin family =

Russian noble family

House of Bakunin Бакунины
- Noble family
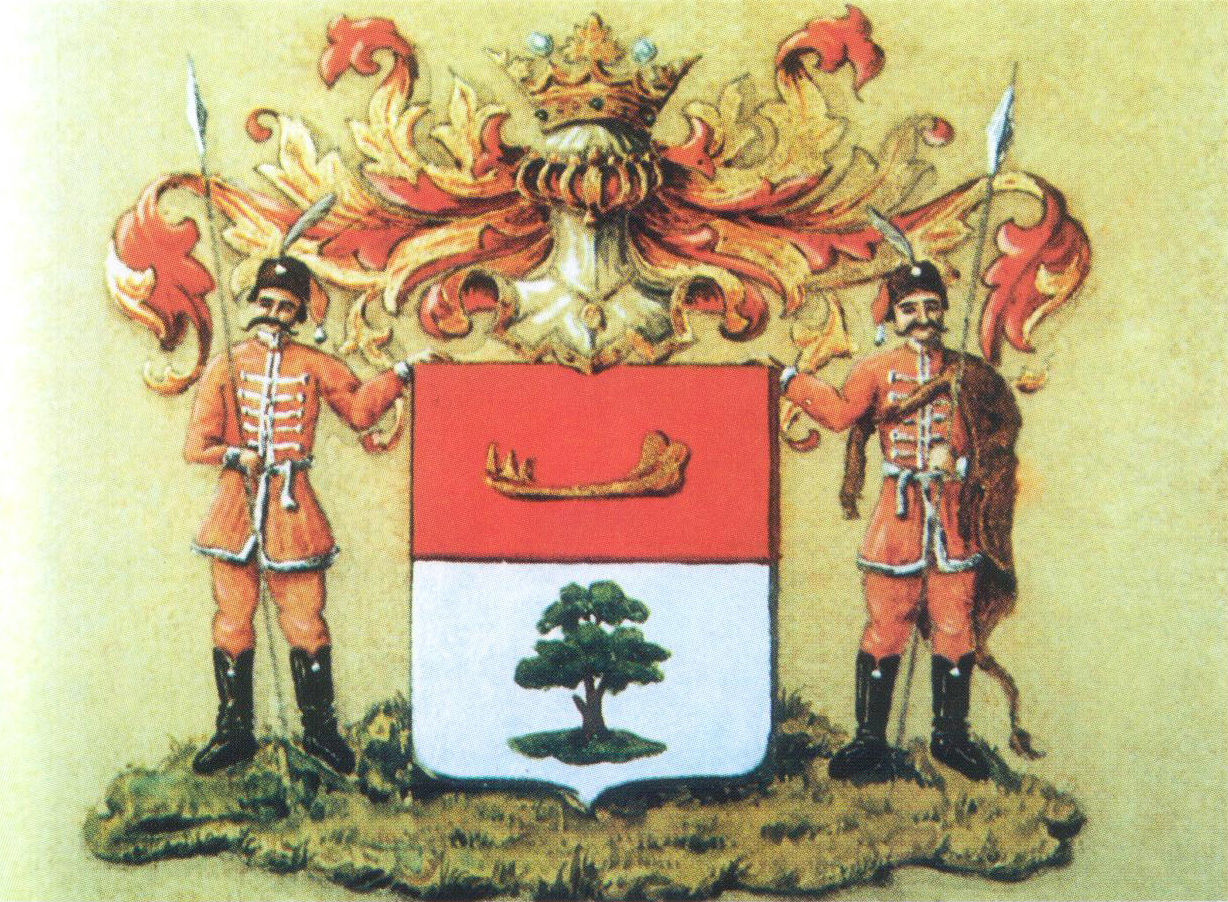
- Parent family: Báthory family
- Country: Russia
- Current region: Tver
- Etymology: From the Russian: Бакуня, romanized: Bakunya; meaning "chatterbox, phrase monger".
- Origin: Transylvania
- Founded: 1492 (traditional); 1677 (documented)
- Founder: Zenislav Bakunin (traditional); Nikifor Bakunin (documented)
- Estate: Pryamukhino

The Bakunin family (Russian: Баку́нины) is an old Russian noble family, claiming descent from the Hungarian House of Báthory.

== History ==
The Bakunin family claims descent from Stephen Báthory, the Prince of Transylvania who campaigned against Ivan the Terrible for control over Livonia. According to the family legend, the Bakunin dynasty was founded in 1492 by Zenislav Bakunin, one of the three brothers of the Báthory family who left Hungary to serve under Ivan III of Russia ("the Great"). Zenislav was subsequently baptised as Peter Bakunin and granted estates in Ryazan, where his family continued to serve the Russian Empire. But the first documented ancestor of the Bakunins was a 17th-century Moscow clerk Nikifor Evdokimov, who became a noble in 1677, going by the nickname of "Bakunin".

== Family tree ==
- Mikhail Ivanovich Bakunin — commandant in Tsaritsyn under Peter the Great;
  - Vasily Mikhailovich Bakunin (1700—1766) — Active State Councillor and official of the Collegium of Foreign Affairs under Elizabeth of Russia;
    - Pyotr Vasilyevich-Bolshoy Bakunin (1724—1800) — official of the Collegium of Foreign Affairs, rose to the rank of Active State Councillor. From 1783 to 1785 he was the leader of the nobility in Luga district, married to Ekaterina Andreevna Barteneva, had three daughters: Anna, Alexandra and Maria.
    - Pyotr Vasilyevich-Menshoy Bakunin (1731—1786) — official of the Collegium of Foreign Affairs, under Nikita Panin, and Privy Councillor.
      - Modest Petrovich Bakunin (1765—1802) — a well-known agronomist, headed the Tsarskoye Selo agricultural school. He held the rank of Privy Councillor.
        - Nikolai Modestovich Bakunin (1799—1838) — College Secretary (from April 1833). He was married to Baroness Sophia Karlovna von Tipolt.
          - Modest Nikolaevich Bakunin — diplomat
            - Modest Modestovich Bakunin (1848—1913) — consul general in Sarajevo and Copenhagen.
          - Stepanida Nikolaevich Bakunin
        - Ilya Modestovich Bakunin (1801—1841) — major general in the Russo-Turkish War and the Caucasian War.
      - Pavel Petrovich Bakunin (1776—1805) — director of the Russian Academy of Sciences and manager of the Russian Academy, later chamberlain and Active State Councillor.
        - Aleksandr Pavlovich Bakunin (1797—1862) — governor of Tver and Privy Councillor.
          - Nikolai Aleksandrovich Bakunin (1828—1893) — active state councilor, chamberlain, founder of a glass factory.
        - Semyon Pavlovich Bakunin (1802—1864)
        - Yekaterina Pavlovna Bakunina (1795—1869).
    - Mikhail Vasilyevich Bakunin (1730—1803) — Collegiate Councillor under Catherine the Great. Founder of the Bakunin family estate in Pryamukhino.
      - Mikhail Mikhailovich Bakunin (1764—1837) — Major General, Governor of Mogilev and St. Petersburg:
        - Vasily Mikhailovich Bakunin (1795—1863) — major general and member of the Union of Prosperity.
        - Ivan Mikhailovich Bakunin (1802—1874) — colonel.
        - Lyubov Mikhailovna Bakunina (1801).
        - Yevdokiya Mikhailovna Bakunina (1793—1882) — an artist who received a gold medal from the Academy of Fine Arts.
        - Yekaterina Mikhailovna Bakunina (1811—1894) — sister of mercy.
        - Praksovya Mikhailovna Bakunina (1812—1882) — writer and poet.
      - Ivan Mikhailovich Bakunin (1766—1796) — lieutenant colonel in the Persian expedition of 1796
      - Aleksandr Mikhailovich Bakunin (1768—1854) — Tver landowner, poet and publicist.
        - Lyubov Aleksandrovna Bakunina (1811—1838) — the bride of Nikolai Stankevich;
        - Varvara Alexandrovna Bakunina (1812—1866)
        - Mikhail Aleksandrovich Bakunin (1814—1876) — Russian thinker, revolutionary, anarchist, pan-Slavist, one of the ideologists of populism.
          - Maria Mikhailovna Bakunina (1873—1960) — chemist and biologist
        - Tatyana Aleksandrovna Bakunina (1815—1871)
        - Aleksandra Aleksandrovna Bakunina (1816—1882)
        - Ilya Aleksandrovich Bakunin (1819—1900) — landowner
          - Aleksei Ilyich Bakunin (1874—1945) — doctor, deputy of the State Duma of the II convocation from the Tver province.
            - Tatyana Alekseevna Bakunina (1904—1995) — professor at the University of Paris, historian of Freemasonry, wife of Mikhail Osorgin
        - Pavel Aleksandrovich Bakunin (1820—1900) — philosopher-publicist, public figure.
        - Aleksandr Aleksandrovich Bakunin (1821—1908) — defender of Sevastopol, participant in the battles for the unification of Italy, public figure.
        - Aleksei Aleksandrovich Bakunin (1823—1882)— activist for agrarian reform, botanist.

== Bibliography ==
- Carr, E. H. (1975) [1937]. Michael Bakunin. London: Macmillan Press. doi:10.1007/978-1-349-02632-6. ISBN 978-1349026326. OCLC 1004387682. SBN 333 18425 4.
- Leier, Mark (2009) [2006]. Bakunin: The Creative Passion. New York: Seven Stories Press. ISBN 978-1583228944. OCLC 1090891844.
