= Yevdokiya Bakunina =

19th-century Russian painter

- Евдоки́я Баку́нина
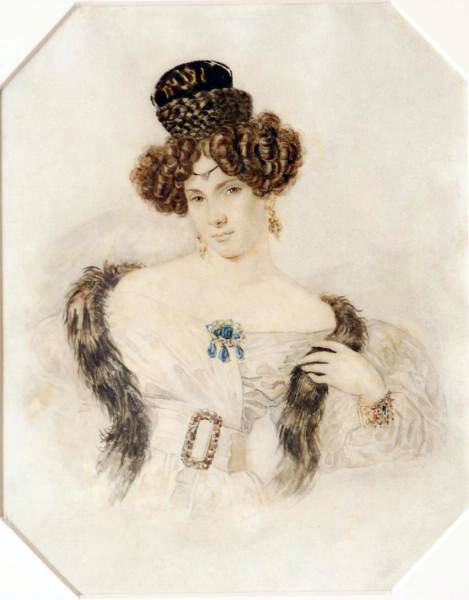
- Portrait of Yevdokiya Bakunina by Pyotr Sokolov (1830)
- Born: 14 September 1793
- Died: 18 April 1882 (aged 88)
- Resting place: Pryamukhino
- Education: Imperial Academy of Arts
- Movement: Imitation
- Parents: Mikhail Mikhailovich Bakunin (father); Varvara Bakunina (mother)
- Relatives: Mikhail Aleksandrovich Bakunin (cousin)
- Family: Bakunin family

Yevdokiya Mikhailovna Bakunina (Russian: Евдоки́я Миха́йловна Баку́нина; 1793–1882) was a Russian artist and the first woman to be sent abroad on commission by the Academy of Arts.

== Biography ==
She was the eldest daughter of Senator Mikhail Mikhailovich Bakunin and the Russian writer-memoirist Varvara Bakunina (née Golenishcheva-Kutuzova). She received a good education and spent her early years in St. Petersburg. In 1820, she moved with her parents to Moscow, where she played an important role in society and became friends with Alexander Pushkin.

At one time, around 1827, Bakunina was the bride of the Polish poet Adam Mickiewicz, but the marriage failed due to a difference in religion and the religious views of the bride and groom. His son and biographer Vladislav Mickiewicz said that, according to his father, he would have stayed with Bakunina if she had not been Orthodox.

In 1828, Bakunina went to St. Petersburg with her mother and was present at one of the sessions in the studio of George Dawe, when he painted a portrait of Alexey Orlov. In 1832, she was admitted as an "outside pupil" to the St Petersburg Academy of Arts. While living with her relative Alexander Shishkov, she copied paintings in the Hermitage Museum. On 22 December 1834, she received the 1st Silver Medal for painting from the Imperial Academy of Arts. Thanks to the efforts of Count Vasily Musin-Pushkin-Bruce, the chairman of the Society for the Encouragement of Artists (whose portrait she painted), Bakunina was able to travel to Italy to improve her skills (1835–36). The painter Alexander Ivanov wrote to his father with annoyance that the money allocated to her would go to waste.

In Italy, she made a copy of Antonio da Correggio's painting The Mystic Marriage of Saint Catherine, which she exhibited in Rome and in St Petersburg in 1839. After spending four years in France and Italy, with the help of members of the Society, she returned to Russia (1839–43). While in Italy, she attended the studio of Alexander Ivanov. Nestor Kukolnik asked her to become a correspondent from Rome in order to tell the readers of the Art Newspaper how Russian artists lived abroad. At one time, as evidenced by her sister Yekaterina, she even worked in the atelier of Eugène Delacroix. She left a self-portrait, which was kept until at least 1915 in the Bakunin family's home in Pryamukhino.

In 1854, she visited her cousin Mikhail Aleksandrovich Bakunin in the Peter and Paul Fortress, where he had been imprisoned for his activities during the Revolutions of 1848. After her mother's death, she owned Kazitsyn together with her sisters. She was buried in Pryamukhino.

== Bibliography ==
- Petrov, P. N. Сборник Материалов для истории И. А. X. [Collection of Materials for the History of I. A. X.] (in Russian). Vol. II. p. 324.
- Отчеты О. П. X. [Reports of O. P. X.] (in Russian). 1835–1836. pp. 22–24.
- Отчеты О. П. X. [Reports of O. P. X.] (in Russian). 1839–1840. p. 14.
- Библиотека для чтения [Library for Reading] (in Russian). Vol. 37. 1839. p. 55.
