= Alexander Bakunin =

Russian diplomat, prominent member of the Tver nobility, poet and publicist

- Александр Бакунин
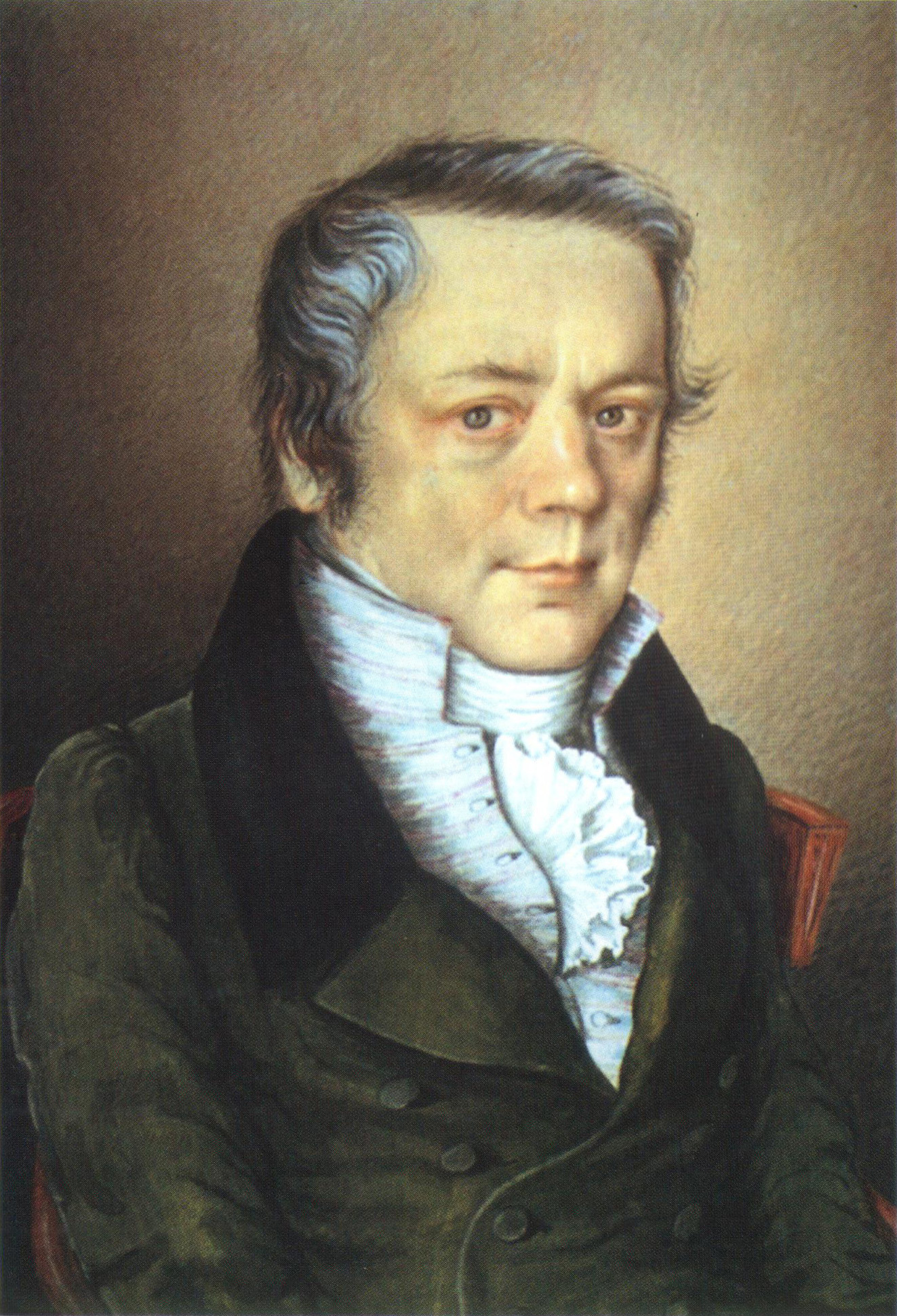
- Portrait of Alexander Bakunin
- Born: 28 October 1768; Pryamukhino, Novotorzhsky, Tver, Russian Empire
- Died: 18 December 1854 (aged 86); Pryamukhino, Novotorzhsky, Tver, Russian Empire
- Occupations: Poet, Diplomat
- Spouse: Varvara Alexandrovna Muravyova
- Children: 11, including Mikhail, Tatyana, Pavel, Alexander, Alexey, Varvara and Alexandra

Alexander Mikhailovich Bakunin (Russian: Алекса́ндр Миха́йлович Баку́нин; 28 October [O.S. 17 October] 1768 – 18 December [O.S. 6 December] 1854) was a Russian diplomat, a prominent member of the Tver nobility, poet (Note: For example, he wrote a long poem Osuga (named after the river on which Pryamukhino is located), in which he described his original family life with living features.) and publicist from the Bakunin family. He owned the Pryamukhino estate, where he was visited by famous figures of Russian culture including Vissarion Belinsky, Nikolai Stankevich and Timofey Granovsky. He was also the father of the revolutionary anarchist Mikhail Bakunin.

== Biography ==
Bakunin was born on 28 October [O.S. 17 October] 1768 (Note: Sometimes the year of birth of A. M. Bakunin is indicated in 1765.) in the village of Pryamukhino, Novotorzhsky district of the Tver province of the Russian Empire, into the family of a state councilor, vice-president of the chamber collegium Mikhail Vasilyevich Bakunin (1730-1803) and Princess Lyubov Petrovna Myshetskaya (1738-1814).

In 1781, Bakunin, under the patronage of his uncle Peter Vasilyevich Bakunin ("the little one"), was sent to Piedmont, where he began serving as an actuary at the office of the Russian envoy in Turin. In Piedmont, he graduated from the Faculty of Natural History of the University of Turin. (Note: According to other sources of the University of Padua.)

In 1789, after graduating from the university, he wrote his thesis (Note: The dissertation was written and defended in Latin.) on helminthology (Note: A copy of this dissertation was kept for a long time in the family library in Pryamukhino.) at the Faculty of Natural Philosophy and received his PhD. In July 1789, for his scientific merits, he was elected a corresponding member of the Turin Royal Academy of Sciences.

In 1789, he served in Paris, where he observed the French Revolution, which he later described as "the bloody inconveniences of the transition of supreme power into the hands of people who have no other qualities than free-thinking." These experiences made him a political conservative and an opponent of any social upheaval. He believed that "the feasible maintenance of power and existing laws is the path of every honest and enlightened person, and nationwide participation in governing the country is a dream inspired by the microscopic republics of Ancient Greece." At the same time, according to Vissarion Belinsky, who knew him, he was "one of those people blessed by God at birth, who will be born with everything that constitutes a higher spiritual person." Thanks to his personal, human qualities, he later managed to create an atmosphere in his estate Pryamukhino, permeated with love and poetry, and favourable for philosophical reflection and free-thinking.

=== Return to Pryamukhino ===
In March 1790, at his parents' insistence, Bakunin returned to Russia. On 14 July 1790, he resigned from the service, and on 31 March 1791, he retired with the rank of court councilor. For some time after his resignation, he lived in St. Petersburg, where he was an active member of the literary circle of his longtime acquaintance (and by that time a relative) Nikolai Lvov. One of the members of this circle, the poet Gavrila Derzhavin, noted that one of Bakunin's poems was an idyll. (Note: In 1814 Gavrila Derzhavin sent Alexander Mikhailovich Bakunin's poem Harvest to Vladimir Panaev as an example of an idyll.)

In 1791, he settled in the family estate of Pryamukhino in the Novotorzhsky district of the Tver province. Here he became personally involved in the neglected economy of the estate. (Note: As of March 1791, the Bakunins' debts reached fifty-three thousand rubles.)

In January 1797, after the accession to the throne of Emperor Paul I, Bakunin was summoned to St. Petersburg. He was awarded the rank of Collegiate Councillor, and was appointed (Note: “Almost involuntarily,” as he later wrote.) to serve as an advisor to the Gatchina city government organized by Paul I. Here he supervised the construction of a cascade of ponds in the Sylvia Park on the Kolpanka River, which was designed by Nikolai Lvov. However, on 14 November 1797, at the insistence of his mother, he again resigned in order to return and finally settle in Pryamukhino. (Note: "With a sick father, mother and unmarried sisters ..." as he later wrote in his diary.) There he became actively engaged in the restoration of the local economy. (Note: In his letters to his elder brother, he suggested that he also return to the estate and take up the estate production - a weaving factory and a mill.) At the start of his economic reforms, he drew up a draft agreement with the peasants, which, according to his plan, was to be the basis for the reforms carried out in the economy. This project, along with most of his economic innovations, remained unfulfilled. However, by 1804, the debt of his family was reduced by twenty thousand rubles, (Note: He planned to fully pay off debts by 1822.) although his further marriage and the birth of his children (Note: In total, Alexander Mikhailovich and Varvara Alexandrovna Bakunin had ten children.) meant he had to borrow again.

In a preface to a philosophical treatise, Bakunin argued that times of glory and power for Russia were always associated with the freedom of its people, and that the "slavery" of its peasants, (Note: At this moment serfdom existed in Russia.) which at that time seemed natural and traditional to many, was a consequence of the greed of the grandees, unrestrained by the law.

Bakunin was also actively involved in the construction of a new residential building in his estate. By 1810, two separate outbuildings were built, which were later combined into a single structure. In 1808, construction began on a new stone church, which was mostly completed by 1826. He was also involved in park construction in his estate, which the Bakunins inherited from the former owners of the Shishkovs. He arranged picturesque cascades of ponds in the park, converted the old Riga into a Turkish bathhouse, and arranged several baths on the left bank of the Osuga River.

In 1806, he was elected the Novotorzhsky district and Tver provincial leader of the nobility. After his marriage in 1810, he settled for a while in Tver, where Alexander Mikhailovich was a member of the salon of Grand Duchess Ekaterina Pavlovna. In this salon, he communicated with many famous people of his time, such as the historian, historiographer and writer Nikolay Karamzin.

During the French invasion of Russia in 1812, Mikhailovich and his wife decided not to leave Pryamukhino. But the main concern of Bakunin and his wife was the upbringing of children. (Note: By 1816, they had five children: Lyubov (1811), Varvara (1812), Mikhail (1814), Tatyana (1815), Alexandra (1816).) He taught them foreign languages, mathematics and other natural sciences, and Varvara Alexandrovna taught them music. In the house of Pravukhinsky there was a library, collected by Alexander Mikhailovich, so that his children had the opportunity to get acquainted with the works of the best representatives of world literature of that time. One of the main principles in the upbringing of children, Alexander Mikhailovich considered communication with nature, for which he arranged walks in the park and picturesque surroundings. In November 1834, the Bakunin family for the first time in full force left for the winter to live in Tver.

Presumably, he played an important role (with his advice to Mikhail Muravyov (Note: Mikhail Muravyov was the main initiator in this restructuring of the secret society in a more peaceful way, like the Tugendbund'a.)) when the Union of Salvation was reorganized into the Union of Prosperity in 1818. He also became a member of the Secret Society of the North, wishing to institute a constitutional monarchy. After the failed Decembrist revolt of 1825 he gave up on emancipating the serfs and devoted himself entirely to the management of his estate and the education of his children, according to the precepts of Jean-Jacques Rousseau.

During the 1830s and 40s, at the invitation of Alexander Mikhailovich, Pryamukhino was visited by many prominent representatives of Russian society of that time - young philosophers, writers and scientists. For example, the famous Russian writer Ivan Lazhechnikov, director of the men's gymnasium in Tver, where the sons of the Bakunins studied, after visiting the Pryamukhin, wrote about the Bakunins' estate in the best of terms. From the beginning of the 1830s, Alexander Mikhailovich Bakunin was the trustee of the Tver gymnasium.

From the mid-1830s, Alexander Mikhailovich Bakunin began to go blind and by 1845 he was completely blind. Due to illness, he could no longer do household chores. In 1842, his son Nikolai came to the estate after retirement, and he took over all the household chores. At the end of March 1852, Alexander Mikhailovich fell seriously ill, and on 6 December 1854, he died. He was buried in the family tomb under the altar of the church in Pryamukhino.

== Family ==
In 1810, Alexander Bakunin fell in love with eighteen-year-old Varvara Alexandrovna Muravyova (1792-1864), the only daughter of Alexander Fedorovich Muravyov (d. 1792) and Varvara Mikhailovna Mordvinova (1762-1842). She was 24 years younger than her husband and before marriage she lived in the estate of her stepfather - Pavel Markovich Poltoratsky, a relative of the Bakunins, (Note: The sister of Alexander Mikhailovich, Tatyana, was married (since 1803) to Alexander Markovich Poltoratsky, who was the brother of Pavel Markovich.) in Bakhovkino, 30 kilometers from Pryamukhin. According to the family legend, Varvara Aleksandrovna was in love with her cousin A.N. Muravyov, who taught her, among other things, to fence and to dance the cachucha. At first, due to the age difference, she refused Bakunin her hand. Not counting on the success of the matchmaking anymore, Alexander Mikhailovich was going to commit suicide, but his sister Tatyana immediately let Varvara Alexandrovna know about it. She was horrified and decided to become the philosopher's wife. He loved and knew only her all his life. The engagement took place on 3 June 1810, and on 16 October, a wedding followed in the Pryamukha house church. The family had five daughters and six sons:

- Lyubov (1811-1838), was the bride of Nikolai Stankevich, died of consumption.
- Varvara (1812-1866), since 1835 - the wife of Lieutenant Nikolai Nikolaevich Dyakov (1812-1852), from 1838 to 1843 lived separately from her husband abroad, was in love with NV Stankevich.
- Mikhail (1814-1876), theorist of anarchism, was married to Anastasia Ksaveryevna Kvyatovskaya.
- Tatyana (1815-1871), single, Vissarion Belinsky's acquaintance, a poem by Ivan Turgenev is dedicated to her.
- Alexandra (1816-1882), Vissarion Belinsky was infatuated with her, V.P. Botkin wooed her, since 1844 the wife of Gabriel Petrovich Wulf (1807-1861).
- Nikolai (1818-1901), staff captain, in his first marriage was married to Anna Petrovna Ushakova, in the second to Sofya Alekseevna Sokolova.
- Ilya (1819-1900), was married to Elizaveta Albertovna Schlippenbach.
- Pavel (1820-1900), philosopher, author of several works, from 1889 he lived in the Crimea. Since 1861 he was married to his second cousin Natalya Semyonovna Karsakova (1827-1915).
- Alexander (1821-1908), lieutenant, in his first marriage was married to Elizaveta Vasilievna Markova-Vinogradskaya, in the second to Elizaveta Alexandrovna Lvova (1853-1926).
- Alexey (1823-1882), Novotorzhsky district leader of the nobility, musician, botanist. Since 1876 he was married to Maria Nikolaevna Mordvinova (1854-1923), the granddaughter of Idalia Poletika.
- Sophia (1824 - 05/30/1826), baptized on 28 September 1824, in the Pryamukhino Church of the Intercession, goddaughter of Anna Mikhailovna Bakunina; died of dysentery, was buried in the family tomb.

== Bibliography ==
- Carr, E. H. (1975) [1937]. Michael Bakunin. London: Macmillan Press. doi:10.1007/978-1-349-02632-6. ISBN 978-1349026326. OCLC 1004387682. SBN 333 18425 4.
- Leier, Mark (2009) [2006]. Bakunin: The Creative Passion. New York: Seven Stories Press. ISBN 9781583228944. OCLC 1090891844.
- Sysoev, Vladimir (2002). Бакунины (in Russian). Tver: Constellation. ISBN 5-901460-11-1. OCLC 51903675.
