= Tatyana Aleksandrovna Bakunina =

Russian noblewoman and muse (1815–1871)

Tatyana Bakunina
- Татья́на Баку́нина
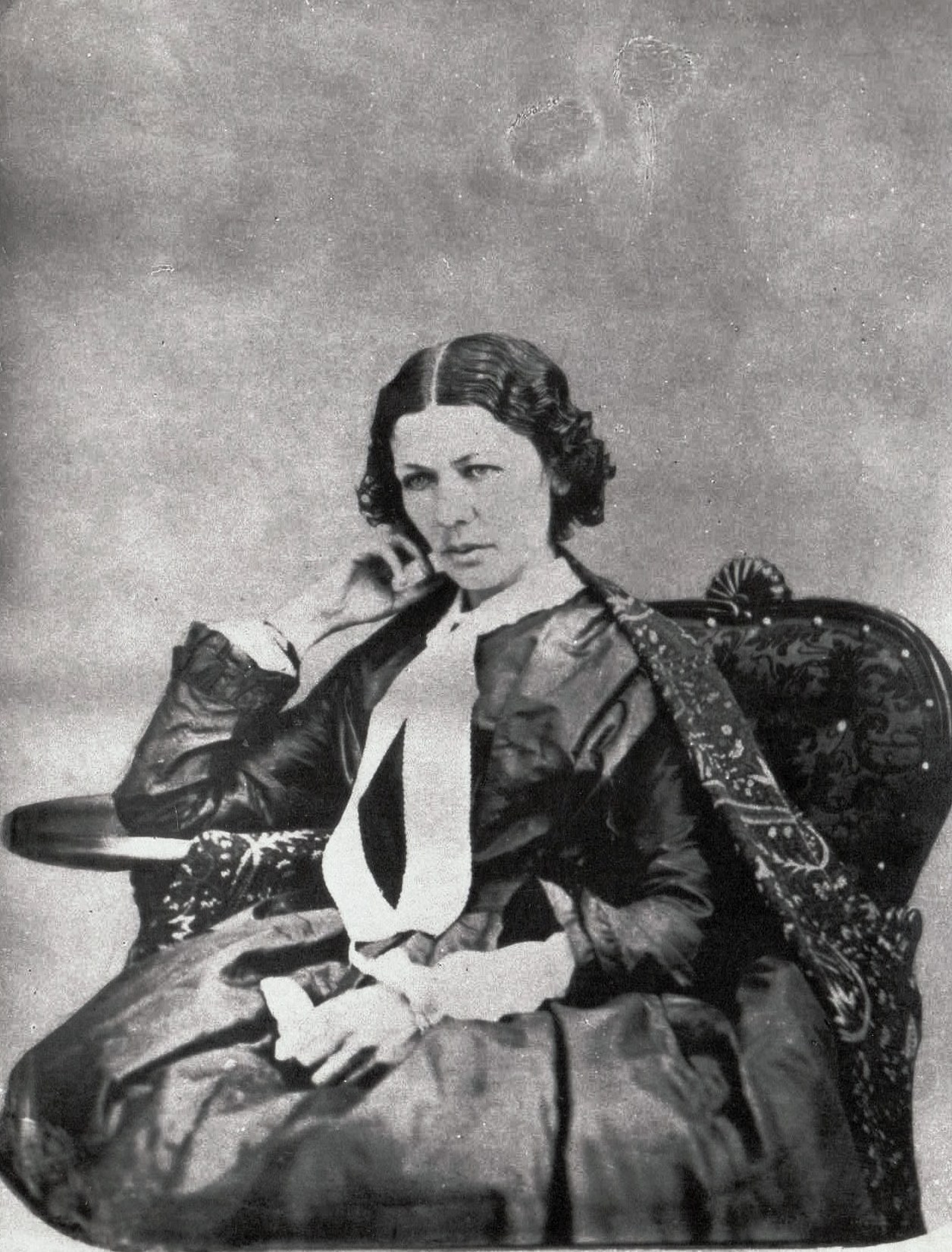
- Tatyana Bakunina (1850)
- Born: 26 July 1815; Pryamukhino, Tver, Russia
- Died: 13 September 1871 (aged 56); Pryamukhino, Tver, Russia
- Partner: Ivan Turgenev
- Parents: Aleksandr Mikhailovich Bakunin (father); Varvara Aleksandrovna Muravyeva (mother)
- Relatives: Mikhail Aleksandrovich Bakunin (brother)
- Family: Bakunin

Tatyana Aleksandrovna Bakunina (Russian: Татья́на Алекса́ндровна Баку́нина; 1815–1871) was the sister of the Russian revolutionary Mikhail Bakunin and the lover of writer Ivan Turgenev. Bakunina's relationship with Turgenev, described by literary critics as the "Pryamukhino affair", is reflected in Turgenev's poem On the Road and several other works.

== Biography ==
Bakunina was a member of a Russian noble Bakunin family, known since the second half of the 17th century. Her father, Aleksandr Mikhailovich Bakunin, worked abroad for many years after defending his philosophical thesis. After returning to Russia, he engaged in the improvement of his estate Pryamukhino. He married Varvara Aleksandrovna Muravyeva, who whom he had eleven children; Mikhail and Tatyana were yearlings; Tatyana was the fourth child in the family. Born on her parents' estate in Pryamukhino village, she was baptised on 28 July [O.S. 16 July] 1815 at the Pokrovsky Church in the manor of her uncle Mikhail Pavlovich and aunt Nadezhda Pavlovna Poltoratskikh. In addition to Mikhail, Tatyana's three younger brothers, Pavel, Aleksandr and Aleksei, are the most famous personalities.

=== Life in Pryamukhino ===
The owner of the estate sought to create a special world in his house, one that combined life and art. Aleksandr himself tutored Tatyana, considered a "typical inhabitant of the Pryamukhinsky nest", in English, French and Italian, and taught her the natural sciences. She picked up her love of poetry and philosophy from her older brother Mikhail.

The writer and publicist Nikolai Stankevich, the literary critic Vasily Botkin, the poet Ivan Klyushnikov, and the historian Timofey Granovsky stayed at Pryamukhino for a long time. In a letter to Mikhail Bakunin, Vissarion Belinsky, who was on friendly terms with Tatyana, referred to her as a "marvellous, beautiful creature":

These eyes dark blue and deep as the sea; this look sudden, lightning, long as eternity, according to Hegel's expression; this face meek, holy, on which as if the traces of hot prayers to heaven had not yet faded - no, about all this one should not speak, should not dare to speak.

After some years, Belinsky began to notice other qualities in Tatyana Aleksandrovna: a certain "one-sidedness of spiritual development", excessive romanticism, a tendency towards enthusiasm and sentimentality, a lack of "simplicity and naturalness". At the same time, she remained an impeccable companion: according to scholars, it was Bakunina who actively supported the composer Alexander Serov, who had fallen into depression after the audience's subdued response to his opera Judith; she also inspired the author to write another work, the opera Rogneda. In Tatyana's constant striving "to save" her loved ones, and in her thirst for self-sacrifice, literary critic Viktor Chalmayev saw the features of the future "Turgenev's girls".

=== Relations with Turgenev ===
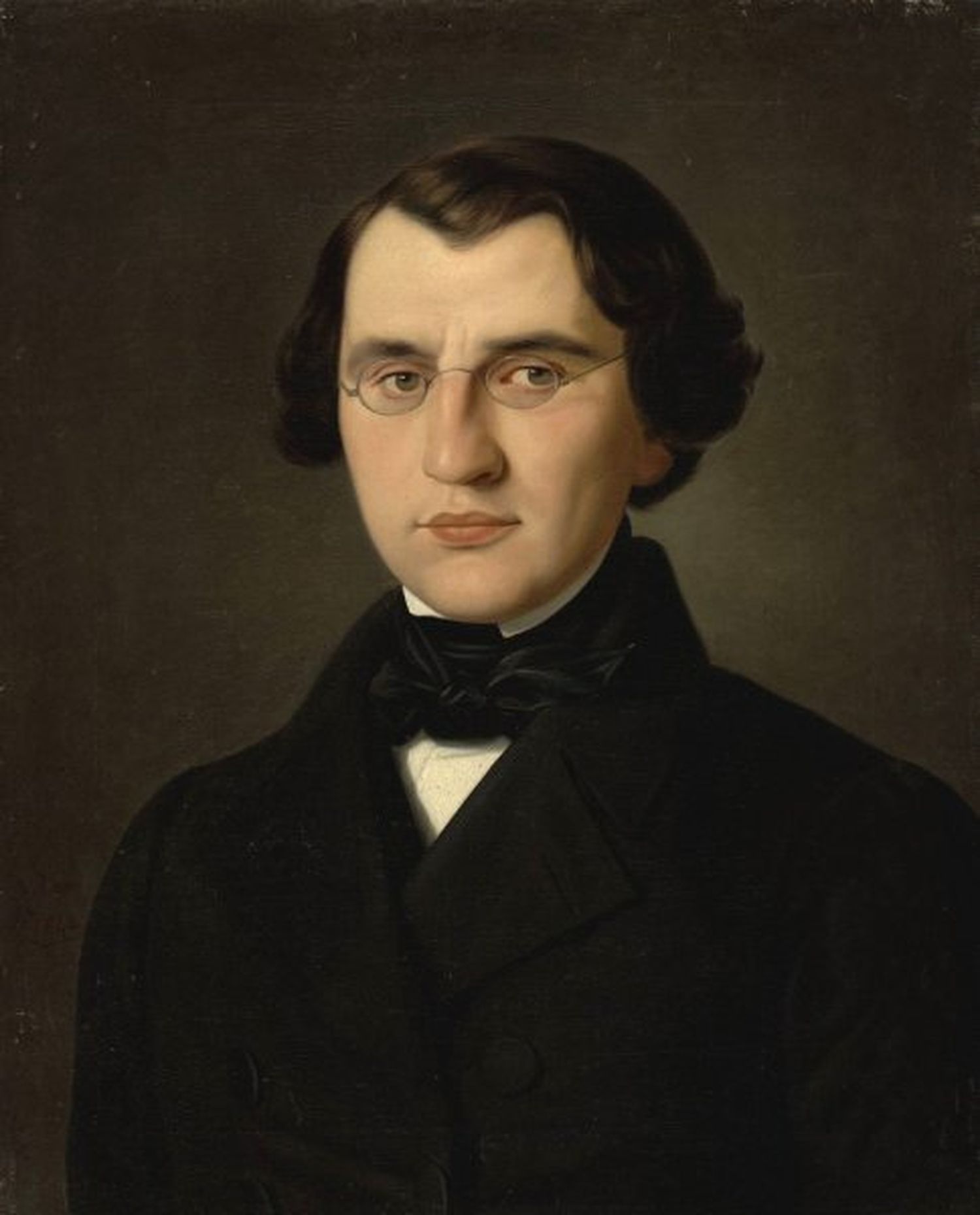
Ivan Turgenev, the lover of Bakunina

Ivan Turgenev, who had come to know Mikhail Bakunin in Germany, accepted his friend's invitation upon his return to Russia and arrived at Pryamukhino in the autumn of 1841. Tatyana had been prepared for the visit of the young literary man, of whom she knew from her brother's letters: Mikhail Aleksandrovich spoke of him as an uncommon person, with whom they led a "wonderful life" in Berlin. For the 27-year-old woman, Turgenev's arrival was a major event; it was she who hit "the first note in the love duet":

Russian

Вы святой, вы чудный, вы избранный богом.
Вам принадлежит не маленькая частичка жизни, славы, счастья;
вам вся полнота, вся бесконечность, вся божественность бытия.
О, оставьте меня в святом, блаженном созерцании той дивной
будущности, которую я смею предрекать вам.

Translation:
English translation

You are a saint, you are wonderful, you are God's chosen one.
You own not a little bit of life, glory, happiness;
you have all the fullness, all the infinity, all the divinity of existence.
Oh, leave me in the holy, blissful contemplation of that wondrous
future, which I dare to foretell for you.

The young people met at the Bakunin estate, in Moscow, in Tver, but Turgenev's image in this story is, in Chalmayev's words, "somewhat hazy". Ivan Sergeevich was three years younger than Tatyana, and her attitude towards him had the intonation of an older sister who was used to patronising and caring. According to historian Nina Moleva, Bakunina sometimes reminded the writer of his mother Varvara Turgeneva by her fervent participation and patronage.

Everything has been decided for them both: he is not Onegin, she is not Tatyana Larina, although... It is still difficult to determine what was life and what was a literary experience in this 'novel'.

— Viktor Chalmayev

In her letters to Turgenev, Tatyana Aleksandrovna called him "a child in whom many germs of both the beautiful and the thin are hidden"; later she reported that she was "ready to hate" her lover for the power he had over her. Suffering from his silence, the girl asked that he remember the one who was "waiting for the call, to give all her strength, all her love, all her devotion". Turgenev, as researchers point out, parted from Bakunina "quite majestically". In his farewell letter to Tatyana he called her his Muse and confessed that he "had never loved any woman more" than her; at the same time, he asked for "a blessing on the road" and offered to forget "all that is hard, all that is half-hearted".

=== Concern for her brother ===
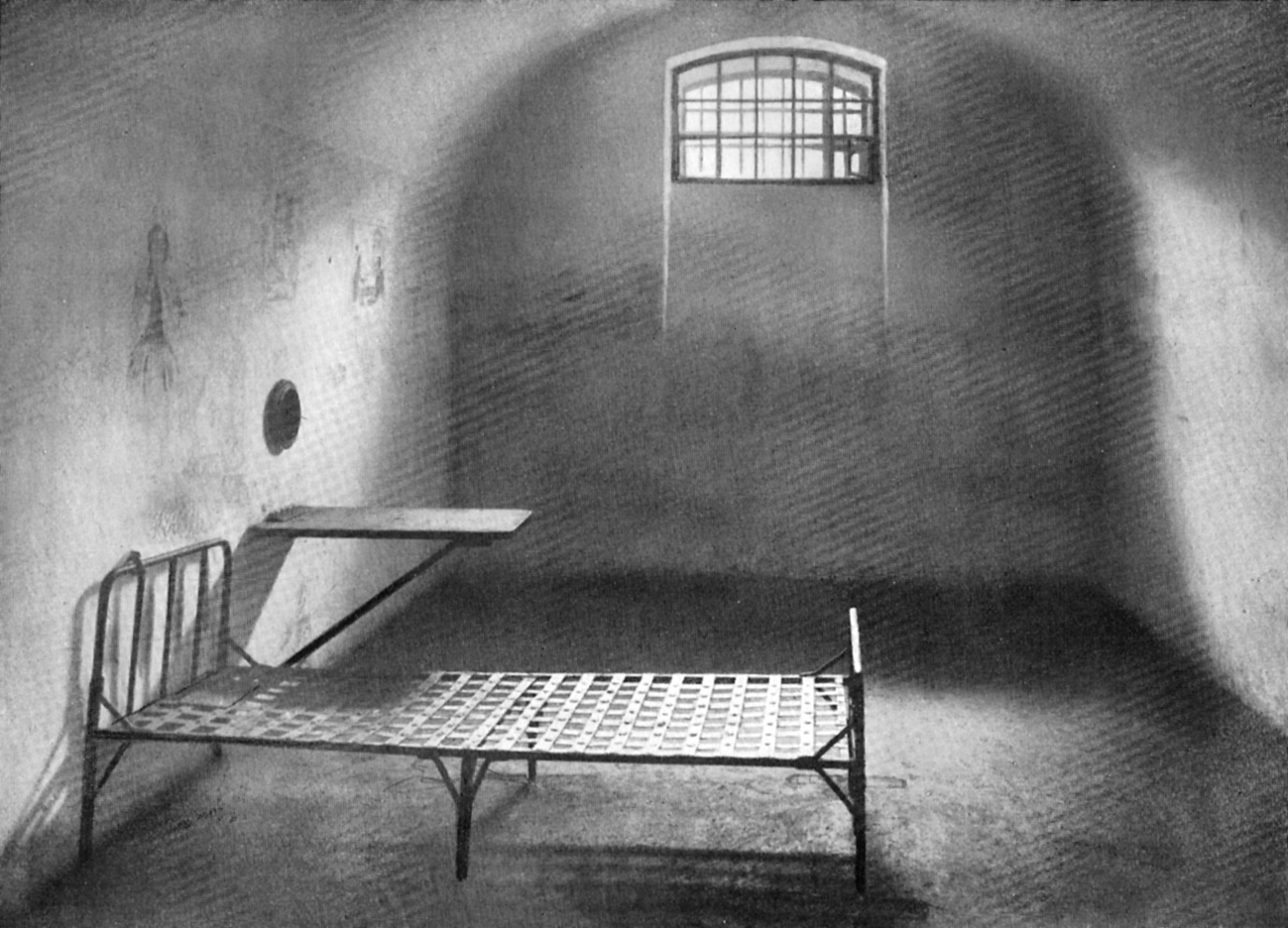
Mikhail Bakunin's cell in the Peter and Paul Fortress

After parting with Turgenev, Tatyana Aleksandrovna, who never married, concentrated all her attention on the fate of her brother Mikhail. In 1851, while in the Alekseevsky Ravelin of the Peter and Paul Fortress, Bakunin petitioned Tsar Nicholas I for a visit from his old parents and a "beloved sister whom he did not even know if she was alive". Permission was granted; Tatyana Aleksandrovna left for Saint Petersburg.

She met her imprisoned brother again one year later, and once more another year and a half after that; the meetings were preceded by Tatyana Aleksandrovna's troubles, who personally addressed both to the head of the secret police, Leonty Dubelt, and to Nicholas I:

With a feeling of boundless gratitude for this mercy I venture to lay myself at Your Imperial Majesty's feet, humbly requesting Your Gracious Majesty's permission to visit my brother a few more times, while I remain in Saint Petersburg, where I have come solely to see him, at least to give him some comfort in his unhappy condition.

Researchers have not established what Mikhail and Tatyana talked about during the meetings, but it is known that Tatyana managed to smuggle out a "coded lexicon" drawn up by Bakunin - a system of codes for exchanging information with comrades-in-arms. In addition, largely due to her intercessions, Mikhail Aleksandrovich was once again allowed to correspond with his relatives. Later, while in the Shlisselburg Fortress, Mikhail was able to receive parcels of tea, tobacco and books from Pryamukhino, as well as portraits of his parents and sister. In letters to Tatyana, Mikhail worried that she was "sick and exhausted", asked that their brother Pavel find her a good doctor in Saint Petersburg, and confessed that he hoped for her "like a stone mountain."

Tatyana Alexandrovna died from a brain abscess on 13 September [O.S. 1 September] 1871 and was buried in the family vault in Pryamukhino. Mikhail, who outlived her by five years, recalled with nostalgia in his last letter to his family, sent from Lugano four months before his death, about the "Pryamukhino world" and the times when he and his beloved sister "went off to the island".

== Bakunina in Turgenev's work ==
In November 1843, Turgenev wrote the poem On the Road (Russian: В дороге), which became famous as a romance by the composer Erast Abaza, entitled Misty Morning, Grey Morning (Russian: Утро туманное, утро седое). Literary scholars believe that this "masterpiece of Russian poetry" was created under the influence of Ivan Sergeyevich's recollections of the "Pryamukhin novel". The poem, according to Viktor Chalmayev, recreates "moments of the utmost fullness of love feeling", which has experienced both "blossom and sad fading".

Researchers have found a connection between some of Bakunina's letters and some of Turgenev's poems. This connection, which has been called "the lyrical diary in verse", is apparent in the poem The Neva ("Now, perhaps, by the window / She sits... and does not suffer; / But like a candle in the wind, she melts / And flares up... "), which is a response to one of Tatyana Aleksandrovna's confessional letters, as well as in the poems "On a summer night, when, full of anxious sadness...", "When I parted with you..." and others.

The Pryamukhino affair also had its imprint on Turgenev's short story "The Correspondence", which contains fragments of letters from Bakunina and Ivan Sergeyevich as well as the short story "Andrei Kolosov" published in the Otechestvennye Zapiski (Fatherland Notes). Although this work is not strictly autobiographical, literary commentators suggest that "Turgenev has added a great deal of himself and his own personal touch to the narrator and his love story with Varya, which is connected to Bakunina's infatuation with her". His recollections of the "pryamukhin period" form the basis of another Turgenev story, "Tatyana Borisovna and Her Nephew", whose heroine is "an old maid" who enjoys reading Goethe, Schiller, and German philosophers:

It has been repeatedly noted in the research literature that the story reflects Turgenev's "philosophical romance" with M. A. Bakunin's sister Tatyana Aleksandrovna Bakunina, dating from 1841-1842, and that some of her features have been parodied in the image of the "old maid".

== Bibliography ==
- Bogoslovsky, Nikolai Veniaminovich (1961). Тургенев [Turgenev]. Lives of Remarkable People (in Russian). Moscow: Molodaya Gvardiya. p. 9. Archived from the original on 4 March 2016.
- Chalmayev, V. A. (1986). Иван Тургенев [Ivan Turgenev]. Любителям российской словесности (in Russian). Moscow: Sovremennik.
- Demin, Valery (2006). Бакунин [Bakunin]. Lives of Remarkable People (in Russian). Moscow: Molodaya Gvardiya. ISBN 5-235-02881-3. Archived from the original on 20 May 2015.
- Moleva, Nina (2008). "«Роман без весны» Татьяна Бакунина" ["A novel without a spring" by Tatiana Bakunina]. Призрак Виардо: Несостоявшееся счастье Ивана Тургенева [Viardot's Ghost: Ivan Turgenev's Failed Happiness] (in Russian). Moscow: Algorithm. ISBN 978-5-9265-0603-4.
- Ostrovsky, A. (1999). Тургенев. В записях современников [Turgenev. In the writings of his contemporaries] (in Russian). Moscow: Agraf. ISBN 5-7784-0066-7.
- Pirumova, N. M. (1970). Бакунин [Bakunin]. Жизнь замечательных людей (in Russian). Moscow: Molodaya Gvardiya.
- Shchegolev, Pavel Eliseevich (1990). "М. А. Бакунин в равелине" [M. A. Bakunin in the Ravelin]. Алексеевский равелин: секретная государственная тюрьма России в XIX веке [Alekseevsky Ravelin: The Secret State Prison of Russia in the 19th Century]. Voices of the Revolution (in Russian). Vol. 1. Leningrad: Lenizdat. p. 189. ISBN 5-289-00716-4.
- Shlippenbakh, Nikolai (2005). "В Прямухине" [In Pryamukhino]. Путешествие во времени далеком и близком [A Journey in Time Far and Close] (in Russian). Moscow: Arden. ISBN 5-9678-0014-X.
- Turgenev, Ivan (1978). "Нева" [Neva]. Полное собрание сочинений и писем в тридцати томах [Complete Works and Letters in thirty volumes] (in Russian). Vol. 1. Moscow: Nauka. p. 450.
- Turgenev, Ivan (1979). "Татьяна Борисовна и ее Племянник" [Tatyana Borisovna and her nephew]. Полное собрание сочинений и писем в 30 томах [Complete Works and Letters in thirty volumes] (in Russian). Vol. 3. Moscow: Nauka. p. 482.
- Turgenev, Ivan (1980). "Андрей Колосов" [Andrei Kolosov]. Полное собрание сочинений и писем в 30 томах [Complete Works and Letters in thirty volumes] (in Russian). Vol. 4. Moscow: Nauka. p. 555.
