= Tatyana Bakunina =

Tatyana Bakunina may refer to:

- Tatyana Aleksandrovna Bakunina (1815–1871)
- Tatyana Alekseevna Bakunina (1904–1995)
