= Kenneth Kenafick =

Australian poet, writer, translator, activist

- Born: 11 April 1904; Norseman, Western Australia, Australia
- Died: 26 January 1982 (aged 77); Loxton, South Australia, Australia
- Other names: James Kennedy, Leo Conon (pen names)
- Education: University of Western Australia, Melbourne Teachers' College
- Occupations: Poet, writer, translator, activist
- Organization(s): No Conscription Campaign (secretary), and League for Freedom (secretary)
- Notable work: Marxism, Freedom and the State (English translation, 1950)

Kenneth Joseph Kenafick (11 April 1904 – 26 January 1982), also known by the pen names James Kennedy and Leo Conon, was an Australian poet, writer, translator and anti-conscription campaigner.

He was the secretary of the No Conscription Campaign and the organisation's successor, League for Freedom. He was the editor of the Anti-Militarist News and Review journal.

== Early life and education ==
Kenafick was born in 1904 at Norseman in Western Australia (graduating in 1932), and studied at the University of Western Australia and Melbourne Teachers' College.

== Career ==
After his education, Kenafick worked as a teacher in high schools throughout Victoria. Three volumes of his poetry, written under the pseudonym James Kennedy, were published by Thomas Lothian from 1935 to 1939. In 1957, he published an autobiography under the pen name Leo Conon.

He was a member of the Victorian Teachers' Union and the Australian Labor Party, although he broke away from the party in support of Maurice Blackburn in 1942, becoming secretary of the No Conscription Campaign from 1943 to 1946. He was known for his anarcho-socialism and as a pacifist. His 1948 work, Michael Bakunin and Karl Marx, is considered a good account of the Marx/Bakunin debate. He was Secretary of the No Conscription Campaign and the organization's successor, the League for Freedom, for many years. After the organisation was renamed the League for Freedom and World Friendship, Kenafick became the editor of the journal it published in Melbourne: Anti-Militarist News and Review.

In 1950, he edited and translated an anthology of Mikhail Bakunin's work entitled Marxism, Freedom and the State, published by Freedom Press in London, UK, which is widely cited.

== Personal life and death ==
Kenafick retired in 1968 and moved with his wife to Myrla near Wunkar in South Australia. He died in Loxton in 1982.

== See also ==
- Anarchism in Australia

== Selected publications ==
- Marxism, Freedom and the State, 1950s translation
- Poems Lyrical and Descriptive, James Kennedy, Melbourne: Speciality Press, 1936 selected work poetry
- Psyche and Eros, Romeo and Juliet, Two Poems James Kennedy, London: Arthur Barron, 1935 selected work poetry
- The Iconoclast, Leo Conon, Ghaziabad : Bharti, 1957 novel
- Newer Poems 1936-1938 James Kennedy, Melbourne : Lothian, 1939 selected work poetry
- Richard of Gloucester, Kenneth Joseph Kenafick, 1972 drama
- Maurice Blackburn and the No-Conscription Campaign in the Second World War (1948)
- The Australian Labour Movement in Relation to War, Socialism and Internationalism (1958)
- Michael Bakunin and Karl Marx, Melbourne: A. Maller (1948)
