= No Conscription Campaign =

Australian campaign

- Successor: League for Freedom; League for Freedom and World Friendship
- Formation: 1916; 110 years ago
- Founded at: New South Wales, Australia
- Headquarters: Sydney, Australia
- Key people: James Catts, David Watkins, Kenneth Kenafick, and Maurice Blackburn

The No Conscription Campaign was an Australian campaign that started during World War I.

It was succeeded by the League for Freedom, later becoming the League for Freedom and World Friendship.

== Organisation ==
The campaign was based in MacDonell House in Sydney.

== History ==
In 1916, James Catts was the general organiser and Director. The campaign's first meeting took place on November 27, 1917, in the Mechanic's Hall in Singleton, New South Wales, less than a year after the 1916 Australian conscription referendum. Organisers David Watkins, Daisy Loughran, and Mayor Alderman McDougall as chair. Speakers at the event were D. J. McGuire and Austin Elliott who spoke about conscription for World War I.

In 1917, ahead of the 1917 Australian conscription referendum, the campaign published a leaflet calling upon mothers to vote against conscription. The campaign's pamphlet Wholesale Slaughter read "Maintain ‘White Australia’! This cannot be done if our manhood is deported!", arguing that killed white Australian conscripts would trigger an increase non-white immigration to Australia.

Maurice Blackburn's involvement in the campaign was documented in Kenneth Kenafick's 148 page book Maurice Blackburn and the No-conscription campaign in the Second World War. Kenafick was the secretary for the campaign, and later the secretary of the group's successor League for Freedom.

After being succeeded by League for Freedom, the organisation later became the League for Freedom and World Friendship.

The League for Freedom and World Friendship published the journal Anti-Militarist News and Review in Melbourne, edited Kenafick.

== See also ==
- Australian Freedom League
