= Marxism, Freedom and the State =

19th-century book by Michael Bakunin

- 1984 edition
- Author: Mikhail Bakunin
- Translator: Kenneth Kenafick (English)
- Language: Russian
- Subjects: Marxism, anarchism
- Genre: Non-fiction
- Publication date: 1950
- Pages: 63

Marxism, Freedom and the State is an abridged compilation of essays by Russian revolutionary, anarchist, and philosopher Mikhail Bakunin. It was edited and translated by Kenneth Kenafick. Freedom Press published the book in 1950.

== Synopsis ==
Marxism, Freedom and the State critiques the leadership elements of Marxism and promotes consensus decision making between workers. He labels Karl Marx as a bourgeois intellectual who looks down on the working class and sees them as unable to lead themselves. However, he agrees with Marx's critique of capitalist economy.

Bakunin describes the nation-state as an oppressive institution that should be rejected and critiques state socialists for their attempts to uphold it.
