= Varvara Bakunina =

Russian memoirist

- Варвара Бакунина
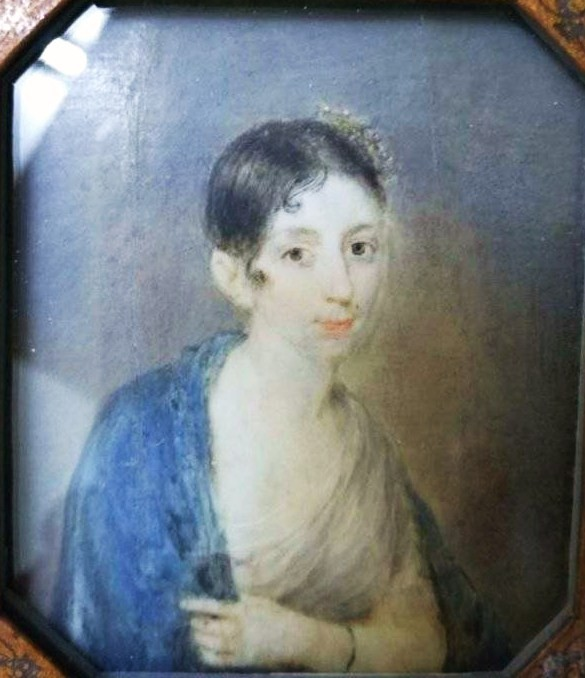
- Born: Varvara Ivanovna Golenishcheva-Kutuzova; 26 October 1773
- Died: 2 May 1840 (aged 66); Butyrsky, Moscow, Russian Empire
- Occupations: Writer, actress
- Spouse: Mikhail Mikhailovich Bakunin
- Children: Yevdokiya; Vasily; Lyubov; Ivan; Praskovya; Yekaterina
- Relatives: Pavel Golenishchev-Kutuzov (brother)
- Writing career
- Period: Early 19th-century
- Genre: Memoir
- Subjects: Wars involving Russia

Varvara Ivanovna Bakunina (Russian: Варва́ра Ива́новна Баку́нина, née Golenishcheva-Kutuzova, Russian: Голени́щева-Куту́зова; 1773–1840) was a Russian writer, memoirist and actress.

== Biography ==
Varvara Ivanovna was born on 26 October [O.S. 15 October] 1773, into the family of the admiral and writer Ivan Logginovich Golenishchev-Kutuzov and his wife Avdotya (Yevdokiya) Ilyinichna Bibikova (1743–1807), daughter of Ilya Aleksandrovich Bibikov. As a girl she was praised by Gavrila Derzhavin himself, starting his poems addressed to her with: "How beautiful you are, Varyusha!"

On 27 October 1792, Varvara married Mikhail Mikhailovich Bakunin (1764–1837), who went on to become Governor of Mahiliou and Saint Petersburg, Major-General and Senator of the Russian Empire. Despite the dangers, she accompanied her husband during the Persian expedition of 1796, witnessed the Assault of Derbent and subsequently recorded everything she saw and heard during this campaign. Her memoirs were published posthumously by her daughter in Russkaya starina in 1887. Varvara also made diaries during the time of the Patriotic War of 1812. These notes detail what was done, what was thought and said in Russian high society during the events of the Napoleonic Wars. Varvara Bakunina's memoirs show her to have been a Russian patriot, although one who was not satisfied, like most of her society, with the Russian politics of the time.

From 1801, Varvara Ivanovna lived with her husband in Mogilev, and from 1808, in Saint Petersburg. From 1813, she was a member of the Patriotic Society, and from 1816 to 1819, was a trustee of the Elizaveta School. In Saint Petersburg's literary circles, Bakunina became famous for the fact that in 1815, after the premiere of Alexander Shakhovskoy comedy "A Lesson to Coquettes, or Lipetsk Water", she crowned the playwright with a laurel wreath. This elicited a strong reaction from the followers of Nikolay Karamzin and thereby contributed to the creation of the Arzamas Society. According to the Englishwoman Martha Wilmot, Varvara Bakunina was:

a small, cheerful, witty woman, clever enough to gather sympathetic people around her and, as far as possible, to banish ceremonialism. Being a passionate lover of the theatre, Bakunina herself exhibited acting talent, perhaps not brilliant, but she played very well nevertheless. In addition, it is so deeply into the role that if she forgot the words, she without stuttering conveyed the meaning of his words, and so skillfully that no one noticed the substitution of words.

Living only on a senator's salary, in 1820, the Bakunins moved to Moscow, where life was cheaper. Their Moscow home was frequented by Fyodor Glinka, the playwright Alexander Shakhovsky, the writer Mikhail Zagoskin, Ivan Dmitriev and Karl Bryullov. Varvara Ivanovna was constantly at the centre of Moscow's cultural and social life. She was aware of all the literary news, attended theatrical premiers, balls, evenings and parties. From time to time, she and her daughters visited friends and relatives in Saint Petersburg, visited friends and relatives, where she is known to have met Alexander Pushkin for dinner with Countess Dorothea de Ficquelmont. She was also in the capital during the winter of 1836–1837, when the events leading up to Pushkin's duel to the death took place. The Bakunins wrote letters to each other about these events: Varvara Ivanovna to her husband in Moscow; and her daughters Yekaterina and Praskovya to their sister Yevdokiya in Paris. Bakunina spent the last years of her life in a dacha behind Butyrskaya zastava, where she had a small house with an extensive old garden. She died on 2 May [O.S. 20 April] 1840.

== Bibliography ==
- Evseeva, M. K. (1989). "БАКУ́НИНА Варвара Ивановна" [BAKUNINA Varvara Ivanovna]. In Nikolaev, Pyotr (ed.). Русские писатели, 1800–1917: Биографический словар (in Russian). Vol. 1. Moscow: Sovetskaya Entsiklopediya. p. 144. ISBN 5-85270-011-8.
