= Authority of the bootmaker =

Concept in anarchist philosophy

Authority of the bootmaker, sometimes called epistemic authority, is a concept in anarchist philosophy describing a type of temporary, fully voluntary authority that an individual allows another to have over them in order to gain knowledge or experience. The term comes from Mikhail Bakunin's unpublished manuscript God and the State, in which Bakunin uses the example of an understudy to a bootmaker accepting the bootmaker's authority in order to improve their skills.

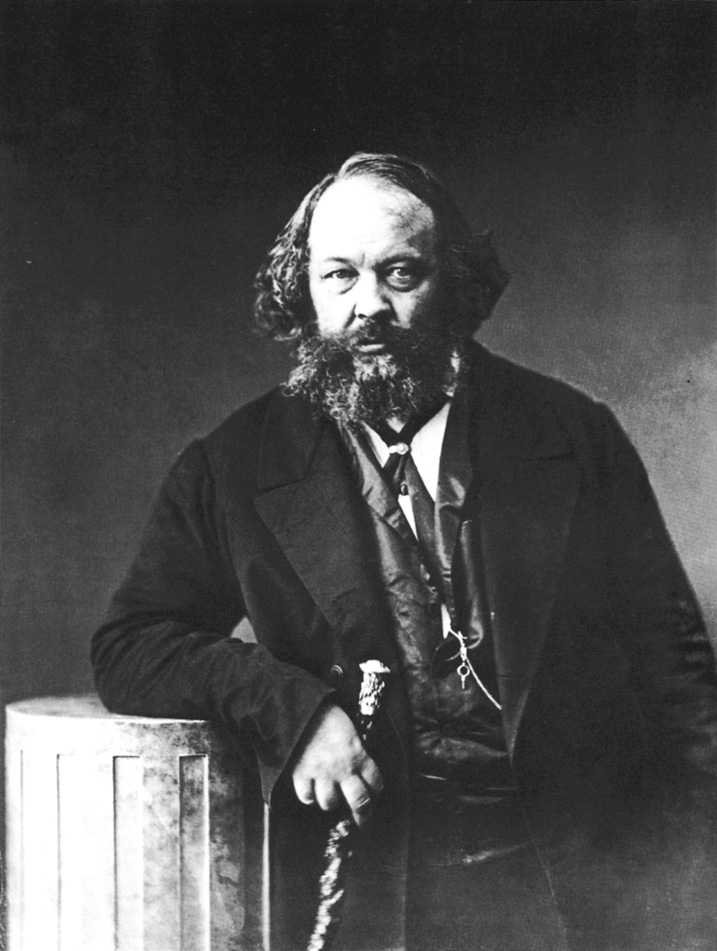
Mikhail Bakunin

== Origin of the term ==
The phrase originated in Bakunin's God and the State, when he said:

Does it follow that I reject all authority? Far from me such a thought. In the matter of boots, I refer to the authority of the bootmaker; concerning houses, canals, or railroads, I consult that of the architect or the engineer. For such or such special knowledge I apply to such or such a savant. But I allow neither the bootmaker nor the architect nor savant to impose his authority upon me. I listen to them freely and with all the respect merited by their intelligence, their character, their knowledge, reserving always my incontestable right of criticism and censure.

Anarchist writers, including Bakunin, have emphasised the importance of visiting multiple "bootmakers" to not be overly swayed by any single person, the importance of being sceptical of any individual who claims to have expertise in sociology or politics that would allow them to govern society, and the corruptive properties of power.

Bakunin states that while coercive authority is a kind of "artificial authority" enforced by institutions such as the state, the authority of the bootmaker is a "natural authority" (in the same category as the laws of physics) desired by the individual Authority of the bootmaker is therefore temporary, with no external consequences (e.g., enforced punishment or Social stigma) for ignoring it.

== Criticism ==
While Bakunin's writings suggest that he sees a distinct line between coerced authority and the authority of the bootmaker, this has been criticised. Others argue that these lines are blurred and Nathan Fretwell gives an example of a religious leader's authority.

== In medicine ==
During the COVID-19 pandemic, authority of the bootmaker has been used to discuss medical advice and contrasted with enforced safety legislation. In many affected countries, COVID-19 preventative measures such as wearing masks and staying inside when sick were both encouraged by medical experts as well as enforced by law.
