= Statism and Anarchy =

Book by Mikhail Bakunin

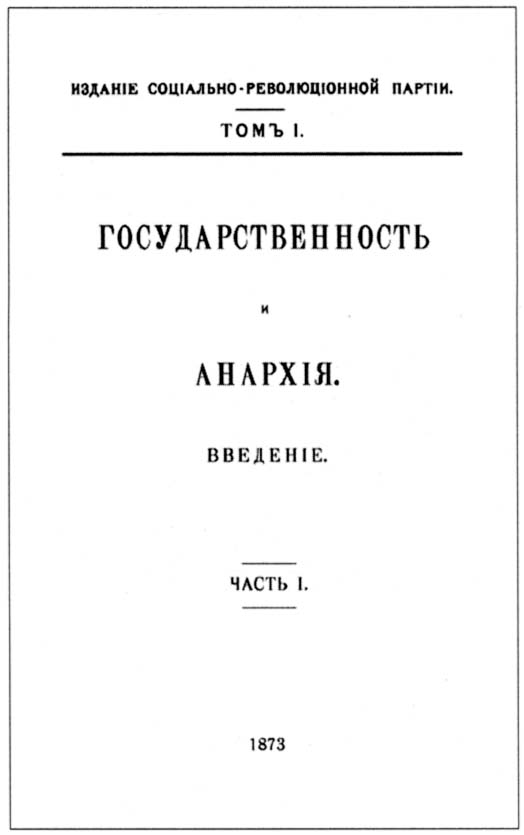
- Author: Mikhail Bakunin
- Original title: Gosudarstvennost' i anarkhiia
- Translator: Marshall Shatz
- Language: English, translated from Russian
- Genre: Politics and philosophy
- Publisher: Cambridge University Press
- Publication date: 1873
- Publication place: Russia
- Media type: Print (paperback)
- Pages: 243 (Cambridge University Press edition)
- ISBN: 0-521-36973-8 (Cambridge University Press edition)
- OCLC: 20826465
- Dewey Decimal: 320.5/7 20
- LC Class: HX833 .B317513 1990

Statism and Anarchy (Russian: Государственность и анархия, Gosudarstvennost' i anarkhiia, literally "Statehood and Anarchy"), often subtitled The Struggle of the Two Parties in the International Working Men's Association, was the last work by the Russian anarchist Mikhail Bakunin. Written in the summer of 1873, the key themes of the work are the likely impact on Europe of the Franco-Prussian War and the rise of the German Empire, Bakunin's view of the weaknesses of the Marxist position and an affirmation of anarchism. Statism and Anarchy was the only one of Bakunin's major anarchist works to be written in Russian and was primarily aimed at a Russian audience, with an initial print run of 1,200 copies printed in Switzerland and smuggled into Russia.

== Contents ==
In the book, Bakunin posited that the state would always be an obstacle to the establishment of a classless society, as those who constituted a state, no matter their ideological orientation, would inevitably constitute a ruling class. He remarked that: "the people will feel no better if the stick with which they are being beaten is labelled the 'peoples stick.'... No State ... not even the reddest republic—can ever give the people what they really want."

== Legacy ==
Marshall Shatz writes that Statism and Anarchy "helped to lay the foundations of a Russian anarchist movement as a separate current within the revolutionary stream".

== Published editions ==
- Harrison, J. F., ed. (1976). Statism and Anarchy. Translated by Plummer, C. H. Revisionist Press. ISBN 9780877002192.
- Shatz, Marshall S., ed. (1990). Statism and Anarchy. Translated by Shatz, Marshall S. Cambridge: Cambridge University Press. ISBN 978-0-521-36182-8. OCLC 20826465.

== See also ==
- List of books about anarchism
