= Bakunin (biography) =

1937 biography of Mikhail Bakunin by E. H. Carr

- Author: E. H. Carr
- Subject: Biography
- Published: 1937 (Macmillan Company)
- Pages: 501
- OCLC: 985473105

Michael Bakunin is a biography of the Russian anarchist Mikhail Bakunin written by E. H. Carr and published by the Macmillan Company in 1937.
