= Tatyana Alekseevna Bakunina =

Russian-French writer (1904–1995)

Tatyana Bakunina
- Татья́на Баку́нина
- Born: 4 February 1904; Pryamukhino, Tver, Russia
- Died: 1 July 1995 (aged 91); Paris, France
- Other name: Tatyana Osorgina
- Spouse: Mikhail Osorgin
- Parent(s): Aleksei Ilyich Bakunin (father); Emilia Nikolaevna Bakunina (mother)

Academic background
- Education: Moscow State University

Academic work
- Discipline: Historian
- Sub-discipline: History of Freemasonry
- Institutions: University of Paris

Tatyana Alekseevna Bakunina (Russian: Татья́на Алексе́евна Баку́нина; 1904–1995) was a Russian-French historian of Freemasonry and heir to the Masonic archives of Mikhail Osorgin.

== Biography ==
Born into an old, Russian noble Bakunin family, Tatyana Bakunina was the daughter of Aleksei Ilyich Bakunin, and his wife, Emilia Nikolaevna Bakunina (née Lopatina). She enrolled in the Faculty of History at Moscow University, where her teachers were the historians Aleksandr Aleksandrovich Kizevetter and Vladimir Ivanovich Picheta.

In the early spring of 1926, she managed to emigrate from Soviet Russia. Having found herself in France, in the autumn of 1926, she married the writer Mikhail Osorgin. After marriage she took her husband's surname. Already in 1929 she was able to receive a doctorate from the University of Paris. For many years she taught at the University of Paris, worked with the archives of the Turgenev Library. Having a lot of contacts with masons and studying Masonic history, she wrote two books devoted to Masonic history of XVIII-XIX centuries, which were published in 1934 and 1935. These books were republished in Moscow in the early 1990s. A great work by Tatyana Alexeevna - "Biographical dictionary of Russian free masons" was prepared for publication in 1940. Because of the occupation of France and the ensuing Second World War the dictionary could not be published. It was only after 27 years that the book saw the light of day.

Thanks to Tatyana Alekseevna in the 1970s A.A. Ostrovskiy handed over some documents of the Parisian lodge "The North Star" to the National Library of France.

From 1993, Tatyana Alekseevna supervised the historian Andrei Serkov in his research into the Masonic archives in Paris. The result of this work was the Encyclopedic Dictionary of Russian Freemasonry.

Tatyana Alekseevna died 1 July 1995 in Paris, and was buried in the Sainte-Geneviève-des-Bois Russian Cemetery.

== Publications ==
- Русские вольные каменщики [Russian Free Masons] (in Russian). Paris: Svecha. 1934.
- Serkov, Andrei, ed. (1991). Знаменитые русские масоны. Вольные каменщики [Famous Russian Freemasons. Free Masons]. Moscow: Interbuk. ISBN 5-7664-0012-8.
- Serkov, Andrei, ed. (1995). "Воспоминания об А. А. Кизеветтере (К 60-летию со дня кончины)" [Memories of A. A. Kiesewetter (To the 60th anniversary of his death)]. Археографический ежегодник за 1993 год [Archeographic Yearbook for 1993] (in Russian). Moscow. pp. 209–214.
