= Bakunino =

Bakunino (Russian: Баку́нино) is the name of several rural localities in Russia:

- Bakunino, Moscow Oblast, a village in Raduzhnoye Rural Settlement of Kolomensky District in Moscow Oblast; 55°9′N 38°44′E
- Bakunino, Nizhny Novgorod Oblast, a village in Nikolo-Pogostinsky Selsoviet of Gorodetsky District in Nizhny Novgorod Oblast
- Bakunino, Tver Oblast, a railway station in Prechisto-Kamenskoye Rural Settlement of Kuvshinovsky District in Tver Oblast
- Bakunino, Yaroslavl Oblast, a selo in Markovsky Rural Okrug of Bolsheselsky District in Yaroslavl Oblast
