= Marshall S. Shatz =

American historian

- Born: Marshall Sharon Shatz; 1939 (age 86–87)
- Education: Harvard University; Columbia University
- Occupation: Historian

Marshall Sharon Shatz (born 1939) is an American historian and scholar of Russia.

== Works ==
- The Essential Works of Anarchism (1972, as editor)
- Soviet Dissent in Historical Perspective (1980)
- Signposts: A Collection of Articles on the Russian Intelligentsia (1986)
- Imperial Russia, 1700-1917: Essays in Honor of Marc Raeff (1988, as editor, with Ezra Mendelsohn)
- Jan Wacław Machajski. A Radical Critic of the Russian Intelligentsia and Socialism (1989)
- Vekhi/Landmarks (1994, as editor, with Judith E. Zimmerman)

Translations

- Bakunin's Statism and Anarchy (1990)
- Kropotkin: The Conquest of Bread and Other Writings (1995)
- Kliuchevsky's A Course in Russian History: The Time of Catherine the Great (1997)
- Polunov's Russia in the Nineteenth Century: Autocracy, Reform and Social Change, 1814–1914 (2005)
