= Imitation (art) =

Doctrine of artistic creativity

The doctrine of imitation is a belief about artistic creativity according to which the creative process should be based on the close imitation of the masterpieces of the preceding artists or creators. This concept was first formulated by Dionysius of Halicarnassus in the first century BCE as imitatio, and has since dominated for almost two thousand years the Western history of the arts and classicism. Plato has regarded imitation as a general principle of art, as he viewed art itself as an imitation of life. This theory was popular and well accepted during the classical period. During the Renaissance period, imitation was seen as a means of obtaining one's personal style; this was alluded to by the artists of that era like Cennino Cennini, Petrarch and Pier Paolo Vergerio. In the 18th century, Romanticism reversed it with the creation of the institution of romantic originality. In the 20th century, the modernist and postmodern movements in turn discarded the romantic idea of creativity, and heightened the practice of imitation, copying, plagiarism, rewriting, appropriation and so on as the central artistic device.
