= Mikhail Bakunin =

Russian revolutionary anarchist (1814–1876)

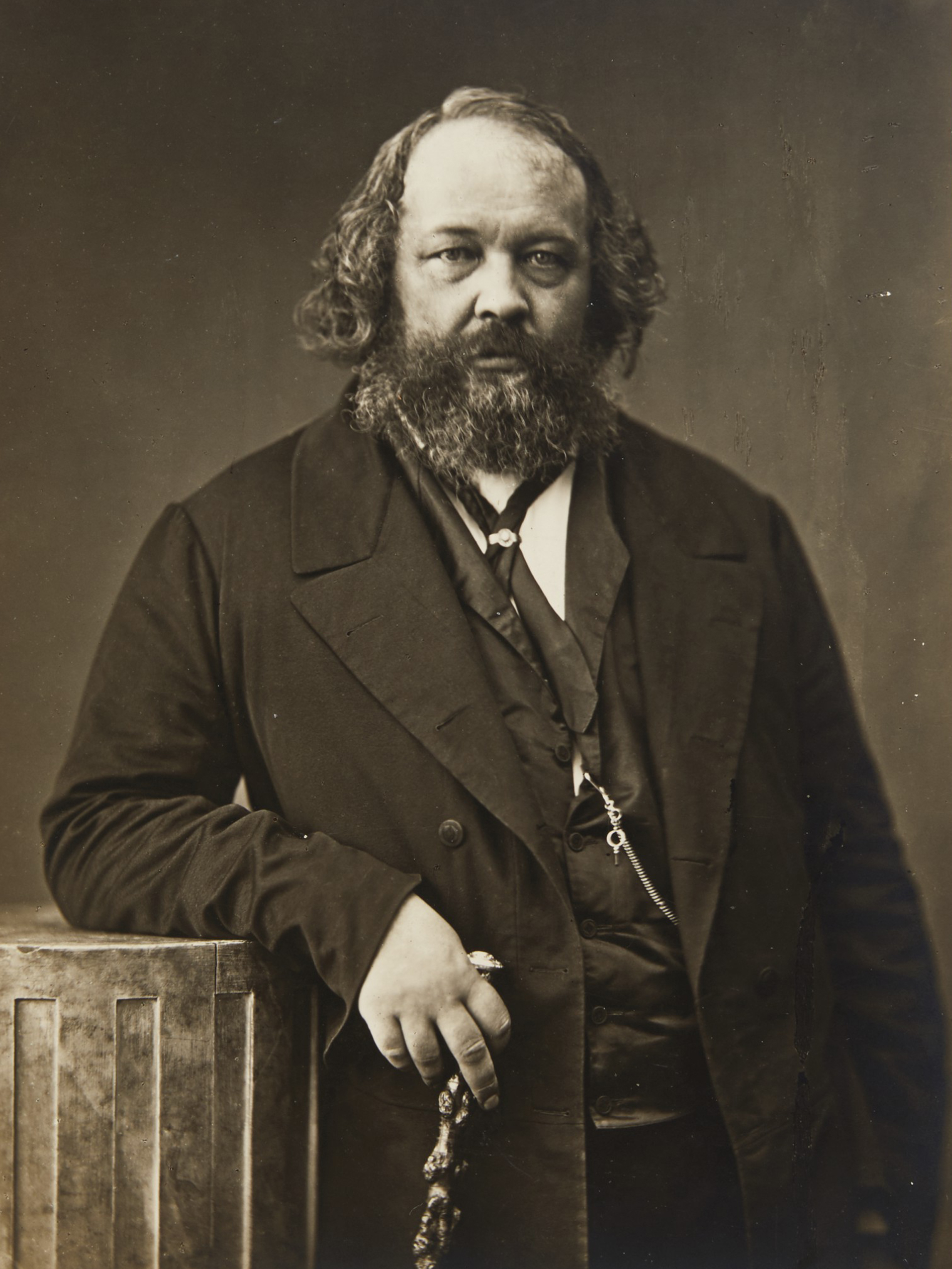
- Bakunin in 1862, photograph by Nadar
- Born: Mikhail Alexandrovich Bakunin; 30 May 1814; Pryamukhino, Tver Governorate, Russian Empire
- Died: 1 July 1876 (aged 62); Bern, Switzerland

Education
- Academic advisor: F. W. J. Schelling

Philosophical work
- Era: 19th-century philosophy
- Region: Russian philosophy; Western philosophy
- School: Collectivist anarchism (late); Left-Hegelianism (early); Left-wing nationalism (early); Revolutionary socialism; Russian materialism; Westernizers
- Main interests: Political philosophy

Mikhail Alexandrovich Bakunin (Note: /bəˈkuːnɪn/ bə-KOO-nin; Russian: Михаи́л Алекса́ндрович Баку́нин, IPA: [mʲɪxɐˈil ɐlʲɪkˈsandrəvʲɪdʑ‿bɐˈkunʲɪn]; sometimes anglicized to Michael Bakunin in older literature.) (30 May [O.S. 18 May] 1814 – 1 July 1876) was a Russian revolutionary anarchist and political philosopher. He is among the most influential figures of anarchism and a major figure in the revolutionary socialist, social anarchist, and collectivist anarchist tendencies. Bakunin's prestige as a revolutionary also made him one of the most famous ideologues in Europe, gaining substantial influence among radicals throughout Russia and Europe.

Bakunin was born into a noble family in Pryamukhino, a family estate in the Tver Governorate. From 1840, he studied in Moscow, then in Berlin, hoping to enter academia. Later in Paris, he met Karl Marx and Pierre-Joseph Proudhon, who deeply influenced him. Bakunin's increasing radicalism ended hopes of a professorial career. He was expelled from France for opposing the Russian Empire's occupation of Poland. After participating in the 1848 Prague and 1849 Dresden uprisings, Bakunin was imprisoned, tried, sentenced to death, and extradited multiple times. Finally, exiled to Siberia in 1857, he escaped via Japan to the United States and then to London, where he worked with Alexander Herzen on the journal Kolokol (The Bell). In 1863, Bakunin left to join the insurrection in Poland, but he failed to reach it and instead spent time in Switzerland and Italy.

In 1868, Bakunin joined the International Workingmen's Association, leading the anarchist faction to rapidly grow in influence. The 1872 Hague Congress was dominated by a struggle between Bakunin and Marx, who was a key figure in the General Council of the International and argued for the use of the state to bring about socialism. In contrast, Bakunin and the anarchist faction argued for the replacement of the state by federations of self-governing workplaces and communes. Bakunin could not reach the Netherlands, and the anarchist faction lost the debate in his absence. Bakunin was expelled from the International for maintaining, in Marx's view, a secret organisation within the International, and founded the Anti-Authoritarian International in 1872. From 1870 until his death in 1876, Bakunin wrote his longer works such as Statism and Anarchy, and God and the State, but he continued to directly participate in European worker and peasant movements. In 1870, he was involved in an insurrection in Lyon, France. Bakunin sought to take part in an anarchist insurrection in Bologna, Italy, but his declining health forced him to return to Switzerland in disguise.

Bakunin is remembered as a major figure in the history of anarchism and as an opponent of Marxism, especially of the dictatorship of the proletariat, arguing that Marxist states would be one-party dictatorships ruling over the proletariat, not ruled by the proletariat. His book God and the State has been widely translated and remains in print. Bakunin has had a significant influence on thinkers such as Peter Kropotkin, Errico Malatesta, Herbert Marcuse, E. P. Thompson, Neil Postman and A. S. Neill as well as syndicalist organizations such as the IWW, the anarchists in the Spanish Civil War and contemporary anarchists involved in the modern-day anti-globalization movement.

== Life ==
=== Early life ===
On 30 May [O.S. 18 May] 1814, Mikhail Aleksandrovich Bakunin was born into Russian nobility. His family's Priamukhino estate, in the Tver region northwest of Moscow, had over 500 serfs. His father, Alexander Mikhailovich Bakunin, was a Russian diplomat who had served in Italy. Upon returning to Priamukhino and marrying the much younger Varvara Aleksandrovna Muravyeva, the elder Bakunin raised his ten children in the Rousseauan pedagogic model. Mikhail Bakunin, their third child and oldest son, read the languages, literature, and philosophy of the period and described his youth as idyllic and sheltered from the realities of Russian life. As an early teenager, he began training for a military career at the St. Petersburg Artillery School, which he rejected. Becoming an officer in 1833, he availed himself of the freedom to participate in the city's social life, but was unfulfilled. Derelict in his studies, he was sent to Belarus and Lithuania as punishment in early 1834, where he read academic theory and philosophy. He deserted the school in 1835 and only escaped arrest through his familial influence. He was discharged at the end of the year and, despite his father's protests, left for Moscow to pursue a career as a mathematics teacher.

Bakunin lived a bohemian, intellectual life in Moscow, where German Romantic literature and idealist philosophy were influential in the 1830s. In the intellectual circle of Nikolai Stankevich, Bakunin read German philosophy, from Kant to Fichte to Hegel, and published Russian translations of their works. Bakunin produced the first Russian translation of Hegel and was the foremost Russian expert on Hegel by 1837. Bakunin befriended Russian intellectuals including the literary critic Vissarion Belinsky, the poet Nikolay Ogarev, the novelist Ivan Turgenev, and the writer Alexander Herzen as youths prior to their careers. Herzen funded Bakunin to study at the University of Berlin in 1840. Bakunin's plans to return to Moscow as a professor were soon abandoned.

In Berlin, Bakunin gravitated towards the Young Hegelians, an intellectual group with radical interpretations of Hegel's philosophy, and who drew Bakunin to political topics. He left Berlin in early 1842 for Dresden and met the Hegelian Arnold Ruge, who published Bakunin's first original publication. Die Reaktion in Deutschland ("The Reaction in Germany") proposes a continuation of the French Revolution to the rest of Europe and Russia. Though steeped in Hegelian jargon and published under a pseudonym, it marked Bakunin's transition from philosophy to revolutionary rhetoric.

=== Revolutionary activity and imprisonment ===
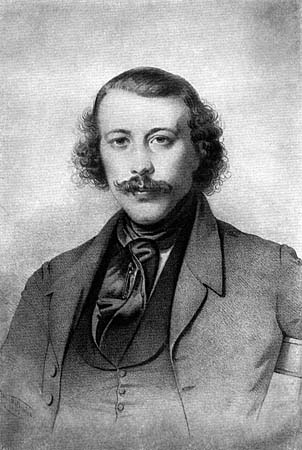
Bakunin, 1843

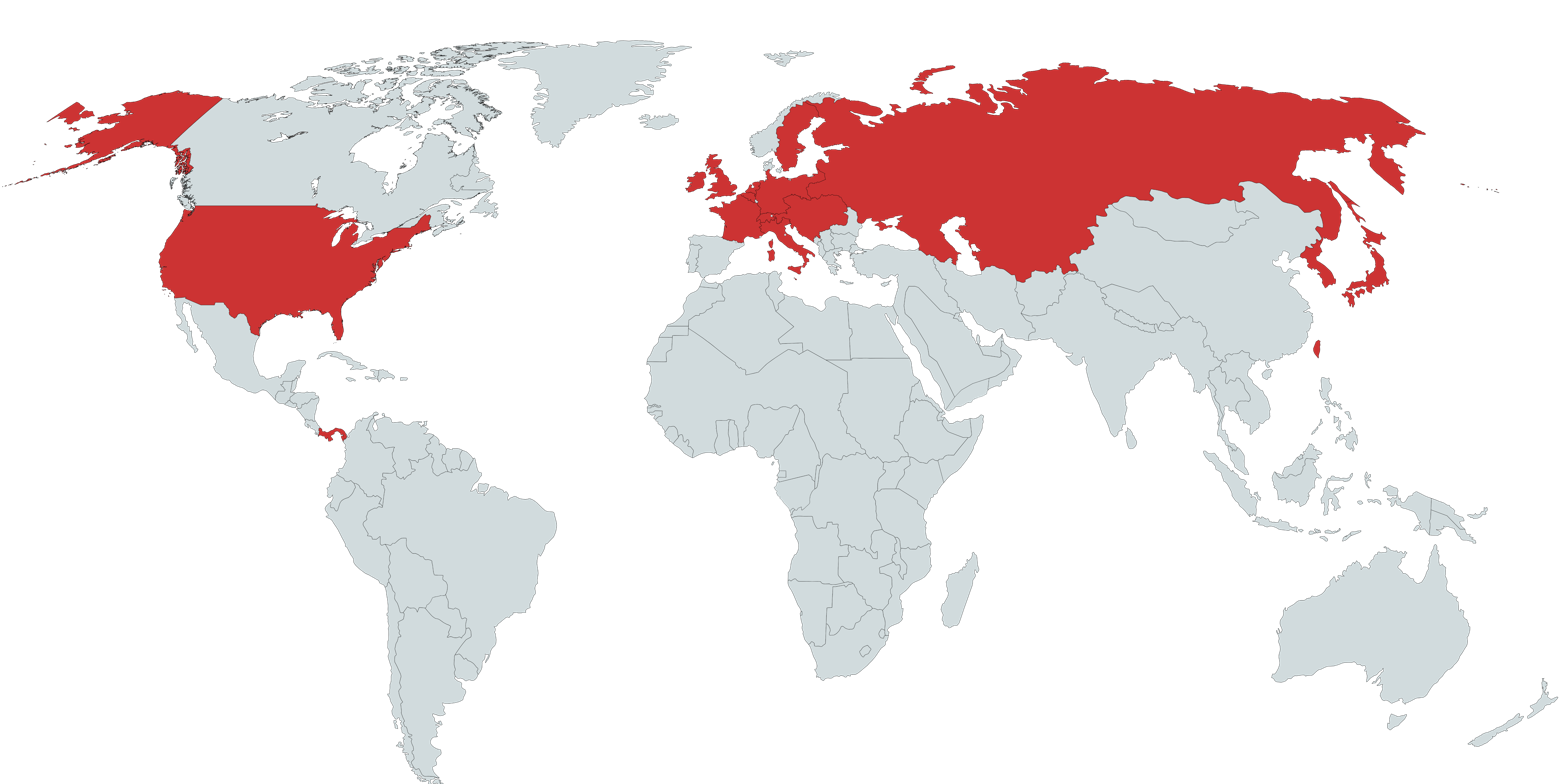
Countries visited by Bakunin during his life

Throughout the 1840s, Bakunin grew into revolutionary agitation. When his cadre aroused interest from Russian secret agents, Bakunin left for Zürich in early 1843. He met the proto-communist Wilhelm Weitling, whose arrest led Bern's Russian embassy to distrust Bakunin. Defying Russian orders to return, the Russian Senate stripped him of his rights as a nobleman and sentenced him in absentia to penal labor in Siberia. Without steady financial support, Bakunin became an itinerant, traveling Europe, meeting the people who had influenced him. He visited Brussels and Paris, where he joined international emigrants and socialists, befriended the anarchist Pierre-Joseph Proudhon, and met the philosopher Karl Marx, with whom he would later tussle. Bakunin only became personally active in political agitation in 1847, as Polish emigrants in Paris invited him to commemorate the 1830 Polish uprising with a speech. His call for Poles to overthrow czarism in alliance with Russian democrats made Bakunin known throughout Europe and led the Russian ambassador to successfully request Bakunin's deportation.

When the French King Louis Philippe I abdicated during the February 1848 Revolution, Bakunin returned to Paris and basked in the revolutionary milieu. With the French government's support, he headed to Prussian Poland to agitate for revolt against Russia, but never arrived. He attended the 1848 Prague Slavic Congress to defend Slavic rights against German and Hungarian nationalism, and participated in its impromptu insurrection against the Austrian Habsburgs. Uncaptured, he wrote Aufruf an die Slaven ("Appeal to the Slavs") at the end of the year, advocating for a Slavic federation and revolt against the Austrian, Prussian, Turkish, and Russian governments. It was widely read and translated.

After participating in both the Prague uprising and the 1849 Dresden uprising, Bakunin was imprisoned, tried, sentenced to death, extradited multiple times, and ultimately placed in solitary confinement in the Peter and Paul Fortress of St. Petersberg, Russia, in 1851. Three years later, he transferred to Shlisselburg Fortress near St. Petersberg for another three years. Prison weathered but did not break Bakunin, who retained his revolutionary zeal through his release. He did, however, write an autobiographical, genuflecting Confession to the Russian emperor, which proved to be a controversial document upon its public discovery some 70 years later. The letter did not improve his prison conditions. In 1857, Bakunin was permitted to transfer to permanent exile in Siberia. He married Antonia Kwiatkowska there before escaping in 1861, first to Japan, then to San Francisco, sailing to Panama and then to New York and Boston, and arrived in London by the end of the year. Bakunin set foot in America just as the Civil War was breaking out. Speaking with supporters of both sides, Bakunin stated that his sympathies were with the North, although he claimed hypocrisy in their stated goal of slave liberation while also forcing the South to remain in the Union. Bakunin also viewed the Southern political system and agrarian character as freer in some respects for its white citizens than in the industrial North. Though a fierce critic and enemy of slavery, Bakunin held a deep admiration for the United States as a whole, referring to the country as "the finest political organization that ever existed in history."

=== Back in Europe ===
In London, Bakunin reunited with Herzen and Ogarev. Bakunin collaborated with them on their Russian-language newspaper but his revolutionary fervor exceeded their moderate reform agenda. Bakunin's 1862 pamphlet The People's Cause: Romanov, Pugachev, or Pestel? criticized the Russian tsar for not using his position to facilitate a bloodless revolution and forgo another Pugachev's Rebellion. In early August 1862, he briefly travelled to Paris. In Paris at this time, famous photographer Nadar took four famous photographs of him on August 7, 1862. After being photographed, he also signed Nadar's Livre d'Or (autograph album), and wrote (leaf 161): "Watch out that liberty doesn't come to you from the north." In 1863, Bakunin joined in an unsuccessful effort to supply armed men for the Polish January Uprising against Russia. Bakunin, reunited with his wife, moved to Italy the next year, where they stayed for three years.

Bakunin, in his early 50s, developed his core anarchist thoughts in Italy. He continued to refine these ideas in his remaining 12 years. Among this ideology was the first of many conspiratorial revolutionary societies, though none of these participated in revolutionary actions, chiefly the revolutionary toppling of the state, to be replaced by a free federation between voluntarily associated economic producers.

He moved to Switzerland in 1867, a more permissive environment for revolutionary literature. Bakunin's anarchist writings were fragmentary and prolific. With France's collapse in the 1870 Franco-Prussian War, Bakunin traveled to Lyon and participated in the fruitless Lyon Commune in which the citizens briefly occupied the city hall. Bakunin retreated to Switzerland.

In Switzerland, the Russian revolutionary Sergey Nechayev sought out Bakunin for collaboration. Not knowing Nechayev's past betrayals, Bakunin warmed to Nechayev's revolutionary zeal and they together produced the 1869 Catechism of the Revolutionary, a tract that endorsed an ascetic life for revolutionaries without societal or moral bonds. Bakunin's connection with Nechayev hurt the former's reputation. More recent scholarship, however, challenges the catechism's authorship, crediting Nechayev as the primary or sole author. Bakunin ultimately disavowed their connection.

=== First International ===
Video of Bakunin's grave

While Bakunin encountered Karl Marx in Paris (1844) and London (1864), he came to know him through the First International (International Working Men's Association), which Marx and Friedrich Engels formed in the 1860s. Bakunin's relationship with Marx became strained in the early 1870s for both interpersonal and ideological differences. Bakunin respected Marx's erudition and passion for socialism but found his personality to be authoritarian and arrogant. In turn, Marx was skeptical of Russian reactionism and Bakunin's unruliness. As Bakunin developed his anarchist ideas in this period, he came to see federative social organization, led by the peasantry and poorest workers, as the primary post-revolution goal, whereas Marx believed in a dictatorship of the proletariat, led by organized workers in industrially advanced countries, in which the workers use state infrastructure until the state withers away. Bakunists abhorred the political organization for which Marx advocated.

Marx had Bakunin and Bakunist anarchists ejected from the First International's 1872 Hague Congress. This breaking point split the Marxist socialist movement from the anarchist movement and led to the undoing of the International. Bakunin's ideas continued to spread nevertheless, to the labor movement in Spain and the watchmakers of the Swiss Jura Federation.

Bakunin wrote his last major work, Statism and Anarchy (1873), anonymously in Russian to stir underground revolution in Russia. It restates his anarchist position, establishes the German Empire as the foremost centralized state in opposition to European anarchism, likens Marx to German authoritarianism, and warns of Marx's dictatorship of the proletariat being led by autocrats for their own gain in the name of the proletariat. This premonition furthered the gulf between the Marxists and Bakunist anarchists.

In one final revolutionary act, Bakunin planned the unsuccessful 1874 Bologna insurrection with his Italian followers. Its failure was a major setback to the Italian anarchist movement. Bakunin retreated to Switzerland, where he retired, dying in Bern on 1 July 1876.

== Thought ==
"The passion for destruction is also a creative passion."

Much of Bakunin's writings on anarchism reflect antipathy for the state and "political organization itself as the source of oppression and exploitation". His revolutionary solutions focus on undoing the state and hierarchical religious, social, and economic institutions, to be replaced by a system of freely federated communes organized "from below upward" with voluntary associations of economic producers, starting locally but ostensibly organizing internationally. These thoughts were first published in his unfinished 1871 The Knouto-Germanic Empire and the Social Revolution, expanded by a second part published in his 1908 Oeuvres, and again elaborated a fragment found and published posthumously as God and the State (1882). The latter was his most famous work, translated widely, and a touchstone of anarchist literature. It appeals to cast off both the state and religion to realize man's inborn freedom.

Bakunin's core political thought addressed emancipatory communities in which members freely develop their abilities and faculties without overpowering each other. Participation within the community was a personal concern of his, and his vision of a community's role in creating free and happy humans stemmed from his close sibling relationships. Bakunin unsuccessfully sought community in religion and philosophy through influences including Arnold Ruge (Left Hegelianism), Ludwig Feuerbach (philosophical humanism), Wilhelm Weitling (proto-communism), and Pierre-Joseph Proudhon (early anarchism). Bakunin turned from metaphysics and theory to the practice of creating communities of free, independent people. His first attempts at this, with the Polish emigrants and Prague Slav Congress in the 1840s, focused on national liberation, but he turned to emancipatory community after the failed 1863 Polish naval expedition. For Bakunin, freedom required community (such that humanity could only be free if everyone was free) and equality (that all people have the same starting basis), including equality in rights and social functions for women.

He envisioned an international revolution by the awakened masses that would bring about new forms of social organization (by committees of delegates and independent municipalities) in a large-scale federation, undoing all state structure and social coercion. In this emancipated community, every adult would be entitled to freedom, to be governed by their own conscience and reason according to their own will, responsible foremost to themselves and then to their community. He did not believe a reformed bourgeois or revolutionary state could emancipate like such a community he described, so his vision of revolution meant not capturing power but ensuring that no new power took the place of the old.

Bakunin was not a systematic thinker and did not design grand systems or theoretical constructs. His writing was prolific and fragmented. He was prone to large digressions and rarely completed what he set out to address. As a result, much of his writing on anarchism does not cohere and was published only posthumously. Bakunin did develop his theoretical perspective through draft programs. Bakunin first called himself an anarchist in 1867.

=== Authority ===
Bakunin saw the institutions of church and state as standing against the aims of the emancipatory community, namely that they impose wisdom and justice from above under the pretense that the masses could not fully self-govern. He wrote that "to exploit and to govern mean the same thing". Bakunin held the State as a regulated system of domination and exploitation by a privileged, ruling class. This applied to States, both historical and contemporaneous, including modern monarchies and republics that each used military and bureaucratic centralization. He regarded representative democracies as a paradoxical abstraction from social reality. Although a popular legislature is meant to represent the will of the people, he saw it rarely functions as such in practice. Elected politicians instead represented abstractions. Bakunin believed that powerful institutions to be inherently stronger than individual will and incapable of internal reform due to the overwhelming ambitions and temptations that corrupt those with power. To Bakunin, anarchists were rightly "enemies of all power, knowing that power corrupts those invested with it just as much as those compelled to submit to it".

Bakunin clashed with Marx over worker governance and revolutionary change. Bakunin argued that even the best revolutionary placed on the Russian throne would become worse than Czar Alexander. Bakunin wrote that socialist workers in power would become ex-workers who govern by their own pretensions, not representing the people. Bakunin did not believe in transitional dictatorship serving any purpose other than to perpetuate itself, saying that "liberty without socialism is privilege and injustice, and socialism without liberty is slavery and brutality". Bakunin disagreed with Marx that the state would wither away under worker ownership and that worker conquest and changes in production conditions would inherently kill the state. Bakunin promoted spontaneous worker actions over Marx's suggested organization of a working-class party.

While Bakunin believed that science and specialists could be useful in enlightening communities, he did not believe in government by experts or letting any privileged minority rule over a majority or any presumed intelligence rule over presumed stupidity. Bakunin wrote of referring to the "authority to the bootmaker" on boots and to savants for their specialties, and listening to them freely in respect for their expertise, but not allowing the bootmaker or the savant to impose this authority and not letting them be beyond criticism or censure. Bakunin believed that authority should be in continual voluntary exchange rather than a constant subordination. He believed intelligence to have intrinsic benefits so as not to require additional privileges.

=== Revolutionary societies ===
Towards the end of his life, beginning in 1864 in Italy with the International Brotherhood, Bakunin attempted to unite his international network under secret revolutionary societies. Composed of Bakunin's circle, these informal groups existed mainly on paper and thus did not participate in revolutionary action or bridge revolutionary theory to practice like Bakunin intended. The groups operated with significant autonomy, having diverged from Bakunin on multiple controversial issues. Despite being cast at the Hague Congress as under Bakunin's stern authority, they were organized by personal relationships rather than the vertical hierarchies and membership ranks found in Bakunin's notes. His written programs played a larger role in his politics than these draft secret societies.

Bakunin promoted the idea of an "invisible dictatorship" also called "collective dictatorship", an international group of revolutionaries in each country, with no official power, with no reward for its members, with no official organisation. As Bakunin put it: "This sort of dictatorship is not in the least contrary to the free development and the self-development of the people, nor its organisation from the bottom upward... for it influences the people exclusively through the natural, personal influence of its members, who have not the slightest power...This secret dictatorship would in the first place, and at the present time, carry out a broadly based popular propaganda... and by the power of this propaganda and also by organisation among the people themselves join together separate popular forces into a mighty strength capable of demolishing the State.”

Historian Peter Marshall wrote that "invisible dictatorship"—unknown and its policies beholden to none—had the potential for greater tyranny than a Blanquist or Marxist party and was hard to envision as presaging an open, democratic society.

Anarchist writer and researcher Iain McKay argues against the accusation which has been made previously by marxists that the "invisible" or "collective dictatorship" of Bakunin was about creating a secret government, and was actually just a term for an international network of revolutionaries spreading anarchist propaganda and inciting workers to revolt against capitalism and the state, writing:

...we find that rather than being a secret authoritarian, Bakunin was, in fact, trying to express how anarchists could “naturally influence” the masses and their revolution.

Irish anarchist communist organiser and writer Andrew Flood in Bakunin’s idea of revolution & revolutionary organisation argued that Bakunin's association with secret societies stems from the fact that revolutionary activity was almost always illegal, and liable to get the author sentenced to years in prison, if not death.

== Freemasonry ==
Bakunin was a member of Grand Orient of Italy. According to some sources, he was initiated into Freemasonry at the initiative of Giuseppe Garibaldi on the island of Caprera in the early 1860s (according to other sources, in 1845). In 1864 Bakunin became an affiliate in the "Il Progresso sociale" lodge that was located in Florence. Bakunin received his 32nd degree of Scottish Rite on April 3rd, 1865.

== Personal life ==
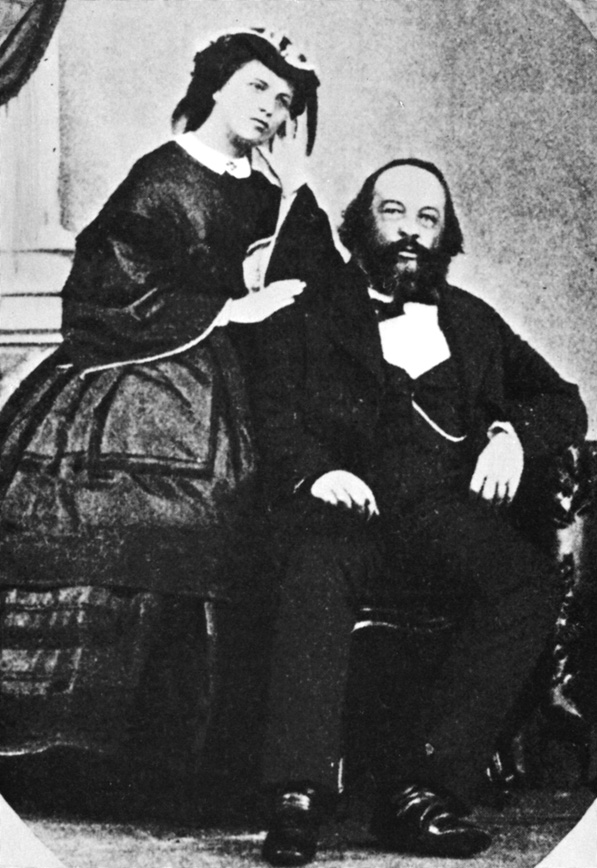
Antonia and Mikhail Bakunin, c. 1861

Bakunin married Antonia Kwiatkowska, originally from Poland, during his exile in Siberia. Kwiatkowska was much younger than Bakunin (a difference of 26 years; she was 18) and had little interest in politics. Their differences and Bakunin's meagre attention to romance have left biographers speculating about possible psychosexual rationales for Bakunin's personal life and the extent of his dedication to revolutionary action. Though she remained married to Bakunin until his death in 1876, Kwiatkowska had three children with another man while Bakunin was still alive – an Italian disciple of his, who married her after Bakunin's death.

== Legacy ==
Bakunin was the leading anarchist revolutionary of the 19th century, active from the 1840s through the 1870s. His foundational anarchist writings helped the movement stand in contrast to capitalism and Marxism and became more popular after his death, with some of his highest regarded works published posthumously and in new editions. His Statism and Anarchy influenced the growing Russian Narodnik movement of peasant socialism, and his anarchism influenced ideology in both the Russian Revolution and the Spanish Civil War. The 1960s New Left revived interest in his works and ideas of voluntary association and opposition to authoritarian socialism, with new editions and translations published.

According to historian Paul Avrich Bakunin's legacy reflects the paradox and ambivalence by which he lived, "[Bakunin was] a nobleman who yearned for a peasant revolt, a libertarian with an urge to dominate others, an intellectual with a powerful anti-intellectual streak", to Paul he professed support for unfettered liberty while demanding unconditional obedience from his followers, and many of his actions put him closer to later authoritarian movements, even if his words were anti-authoritarian.

In particular, the antisemitic passages in Bakunin's writing have been the subject of extended interest, such that Bakunin biographer Mark Leier has said the question is raised every time he speaks on Bakunin. Both Leier and scholar of antisemitism Eirik Eiglad have commented that antisemitism was not essential to Bakunin's thought, nor was his thought valued for his antisemitism. Sociologist Brian Fine, following Hal Draper, argued the opposite, saying that the antisemitic trope of Jewish world domination was at the centre of Bakunin's political thought. Bakunin's anti-Jewish and anti-German resentment are most visible in the context of his attacks on Marx, but his antisemitism predated these passages. Scholar Marshall Shatz noted that there is a gap between Bakunin's egalitarian principles and his ethnic prejudices, even if this antisemitism and stereotyping was common among French radicals of the era and shared by Marx himself.

Syndicalist activist René Berthier known for his scholarly contributions to the history and theory of anarchism, argues that Bakunin was no more anti-semitic than Marx, and while he did believe in anti-semitic conspiracy theories like the idea that Rostchilds are paying Marx to persecute him and advocate central banking, after Marx expelled him from International Workingmen's Association, he did not advocate to discriminate people of Jewish or any other descent, he also points out that the Spanish militant Anselmo Lorenzo wrote that Bakunin’s use of the argument that Marx was a Jew “had a disastrous effect on me”: “This was opposed to our principles of fraternity without differences of race and creed”. Wolfgang Eckhardt writes that “Lorenzo later regretted that his reply to Bakunin’s letter had been so harsh”. A few years later Lorenzo reread his reply to Bakunin: he had himself been “victim of the hostilities and hatred that conflicts produce” and understood the solitude which Bakunin had experienced.

Noam Chomsky called Bakunin's prediction in Statism and Anarchy that Marxist regimes would become dictatorships "one of the few predictions in the social sciences that actually came true".

Bakunin archives are held in several places: the Pushkin House, the State Archive of the Russian Federation, the Russian State Library, the Russian State Archive of Literature and Art, the National Library of Russia, and the International Institute of Social History.

== Works ==
=== Books ===
- God and the State, ISBN 048622483X

=== Pamphlets ===
- Stateless Socialism: Anarchism (1953)
- Marxism, Freedom and the State, (translated by Kenneth Kenafick in 1950)
- On the Program of the Alliance (1871)
- The Paris Commune and the Idea of the State (1871)
- The Immorality of the State (1953)
- Statism and Anarchy (1990), Cambridge University Press, ISBN 0521361826
- Revolutionary Catechism (1866)
- The Commune, the Church, and the State (1947)
- Founding of the First International (1953)
- On Rousseau (1972)
- No Gods No Masters (1998) by Daniel Guérin, Edinburgh: AK Press, ISBN 1873176643

=== Articles ===
- "Power Corrupts the Best" (1867)
- "The Class War" (1870)
- "What is Authority?" (1870)
- "Recollections on Marx and Engels" (1869)
- "The Red Association" (1870)
- "Solidarity in Liberty" (1867)
- "The German Crisis" (1870)
- "God or Labor" (1873)
- "Where I Stand" (1862)
- "Appeal to my Russian Brothers" (1896)
- "The Social Upheaval" (1870)
- "On Education" (1869)
- "On Education, Part II" (1869)
- "The Organization of the International" (1869)
- "Polish Declaration" (1861)
- "Politics and the State" (1871)
- "Workers and the Sphinx" (1867)
- "The Policy of the Council" (1869)
- "The Two Camps" (1869)

=== Collections ===
- Bakunin's Writings. Edited by Guy A. Aldred. Indore Modern Publishers, 1947.
- Bakunin on Anarchy (1972). Edited, translated and with an introduction by Sam Dolgoff. It includes a preface by Paul Avrich and James Guillaume's Bakunin: A Biographical Sketch. New York: Vintage. ISBN 9780394717838 It was reprinted in the following year by Allen & Unwin, London. ISBN 0043210120.
- Michael Bakunin: Selected Writings (1974). Edited and introduced by Arthur Lehning with translations from the French by Steven Cox and translations from the Russian by Olive Stevens. London: Jonathan Cape. ISBN 0 224 00893 5.
- Anarchism: A Documentary History of Libertarian Ideas, Volume 1: From Anarchy to Anarchism (300 CE – 1939) (2005). Robert Graham (ed.). Montreal and New York: Black Rose Books. ISBN 1551642514.
- The Political Philosophy of Bakunin (1953). G. P. Maximoff (ed.). It includes Mikhail Bakunin: A Biographical Sketch by Max Nettlau.
- The Basic Bakunin: Writings 1869–1871 (1992). Robert M. Cutler (ed.). New York: Prometheus Books, 1992. ISBN 0879757450.

== See also ==
- Anarchism in Russia
- Archives Bakounine
- Bakunin family
