= Mikhail Osorgin =

- Born: 19 October 1878; Perm, Russia Empire
- Died: 27 November 1942 (aged 64); Chabris, France

Mikhail Andreyevich Osorgin (Russian: Михаи́л Андре́евич Осорги́н; real last name Ilyin (Ильи́н); 19 October 1878 – 27 November 1942) was a writer, journalist, and essayist born in the Russian Empire.

== Biography ==
Osorgin was born in Perm, Russian Empire and became a lawyer after attending school in Moscow. He participated in the Revolution of 1905, was arrested and imprisoned, and eventually forced into exile in Italy. In Italy he became a foreign correspondent for The Russian News, and a contributor to various papers abroad. He returned to Russia in 1916 and lived there until 1921 when he was again imprisoned for non-conformity and exiled to Kazan. He was deported to Germany in 1922 on one of the "Philosophers' ships". He lived in Berlin and Italy before settling in Paris. In Paris he contributed journalism, fiction, and book reviews to emigre papers.

Among Osorgin's best known works are his novels Сивцев Вражек (1928; Sivtsev Vrazhek is a small lane in Moscow) translated as Quiet Street and Повесть о сестре (1931; Literally "A Tale about My Sister") translated as My Sister's Story. During the 1930s he spent much of his time in the village of Sainte-Geneviève-des-Bois, Essonne, where he owned a cottage. Here he protested urban civilization, promoting a lifestyle that was closer to nature. He stayed in France during the German occupation and died in 1942 in the village of Chabris, where he and his wife had gone as refugees.

== English translations ==
- Quiet Street, Longmans, Green and Co, 1930.
- My Sister's Story, The Dial Press, NY, 1931.
- The Choosing of a Bride, from A Russian Cultural Revival, University of Tennessee Press, 1981. ISBN 0-87049-296-9
- Selected Stories, Reminiscences, and Essays, Ardis Publishers, 1982. ISBN 0-88233-445-X
