= Nikolai Stankevich =

Russian public figure, philosopher and poet

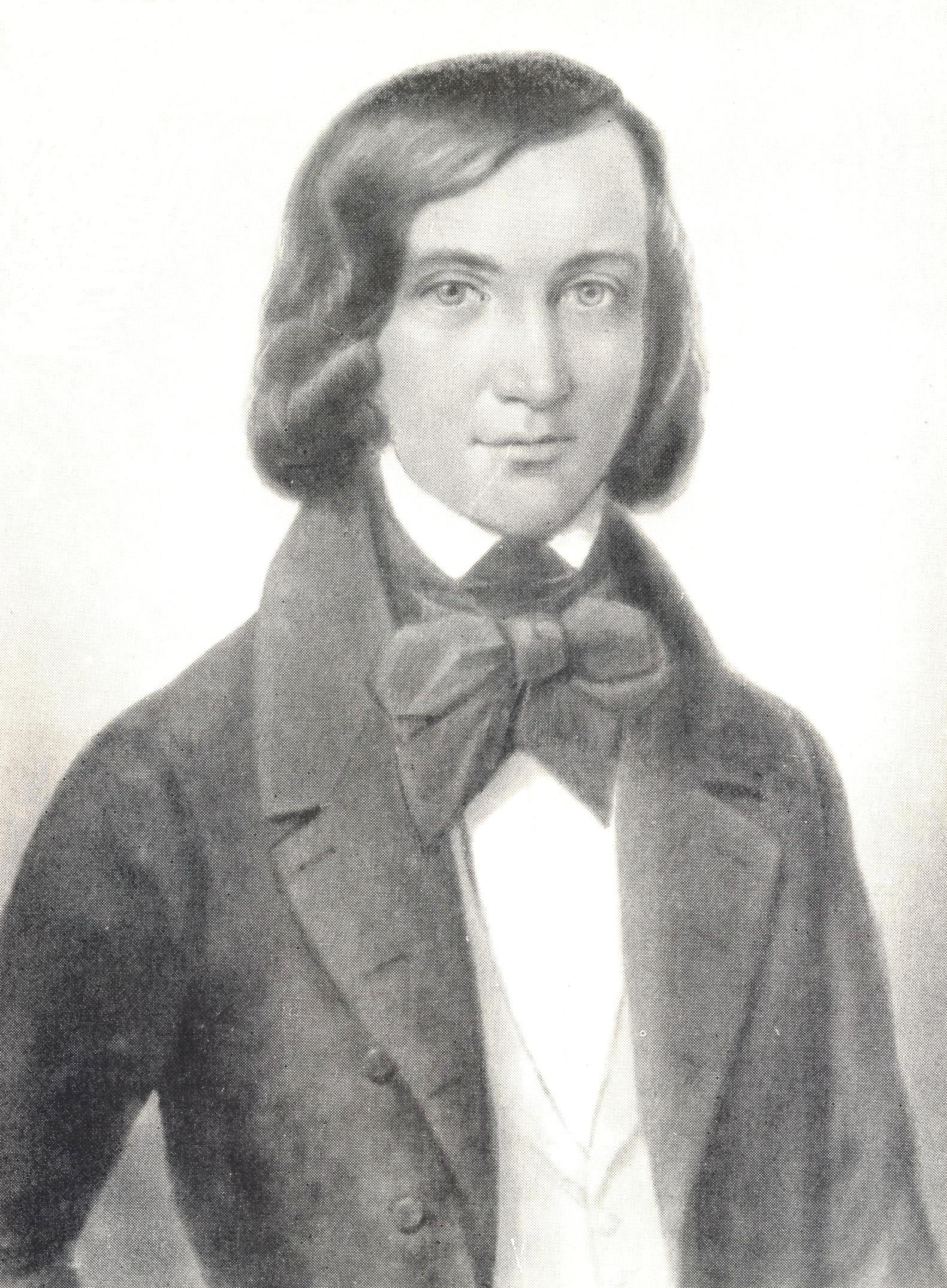
- Born: Nikolai Vladimirovich Stankevich; October 9, 1813; Uderevka, Voronezh Governorate (present-day Alexeyevsky District), Russian Empire
- Died: July 7, 1840 (aged 26); Novi Ligure, Kingdom of Sardinia

Philosophical work
- Era: 19th century philosophy
- Region: Russian philosophy; Western philosophy

Nikolai Vladimirovich Stankevich (Russian: Николай Владимирович Станкевич); 9 October [O.S. 27 September] 1813 – 7 July [O.S. 25 June] 1840) was a Russian public figure, philosopher, and poet.

== Biography ==
Nikolay Stankevich was born in Uderevka, Voronezh Governorate, and in 1834 graduated from the Moscow State University, where he was influenced by Professor Mikhail Kachenovsky and followers of the so-called "skeptical school" in historiography. His father Vladimir Ivanovich Stankevich (1786–1851) was the leader of the nobility of Ostrogozhsky district in 1837–1841. Her mother was the daughter of the Ostrogozhsky doctor Ekaterina Iosifovna Kramer (1794–1841). By late 1831, Stankevich had organized a literary and philosophical society called the Circle of Stankevich. He had been under police surveillance since 1833 due to his connections with a group of oppositionary university students led by Ya. I. Kostenetsky. In 1837, Nikolay Stankevich had to travel abroad due to his tuberculosis.

Stankevich's literary and esthetical views, most of which mirrored the ideas of a Russian historian Nikolai Nadezhdin, presupposed the humanistic enlightenment as the main task of the Russian intelligentsia. Stankevich is known to have considerably influenced some of the Russian and Muscovite intelligentsia in particular, including Vissarion Belinsky, Timofey Granovsky, Mikhail Bakunin, and Alexander Herzen. Among Stankevich's literary works (mostly poetic and not numerous), there are a few verses dedicated to Moscow and a historical tragedy called Vasili Shuisky.

He died of tuberculosis, aged 26, in Novi Ligure, Italy.
