= Mark Leier =

Canadian historian

Mark Leier is a Canadian historian and, since 1994, a professor of working class and left-wing history at Simon Fraser University (SFU). From 2000 to 2010, he was the director of the Centre for Labour Studies at Simon Fraser.

Leier was born in Ladner, British Columbia. Prior to attending university, Leier was employed in various professions, including as a union carpenter and as a member of the Canadian Union of Public Employees. He earned his PhD in History from Memorial University of Newfoundland (MUN) in 1992.

As part of the Graphic History Collective, he helped produce May Day: A Graphic History of Protest.

== Works ==
- Where the Fraser River Flows: The Industrial Workers of the World in British Columbia. Vancouver: New Star, 1990.
- Red Flags and Red Tape: The Making of a Labour Bureaucracy. Toronto: University of Toronto Press, 1995.
- Bakunin: The Creative Passion. New York: Seven Stories Press, 2009.
- Rebel Life: The Life and Times of Robert Gosden. Vancouver: New Star, 1999. Rev. Ed., 2013.
