= Timofey Granovsky =

Russian medievalist (1813–1855)

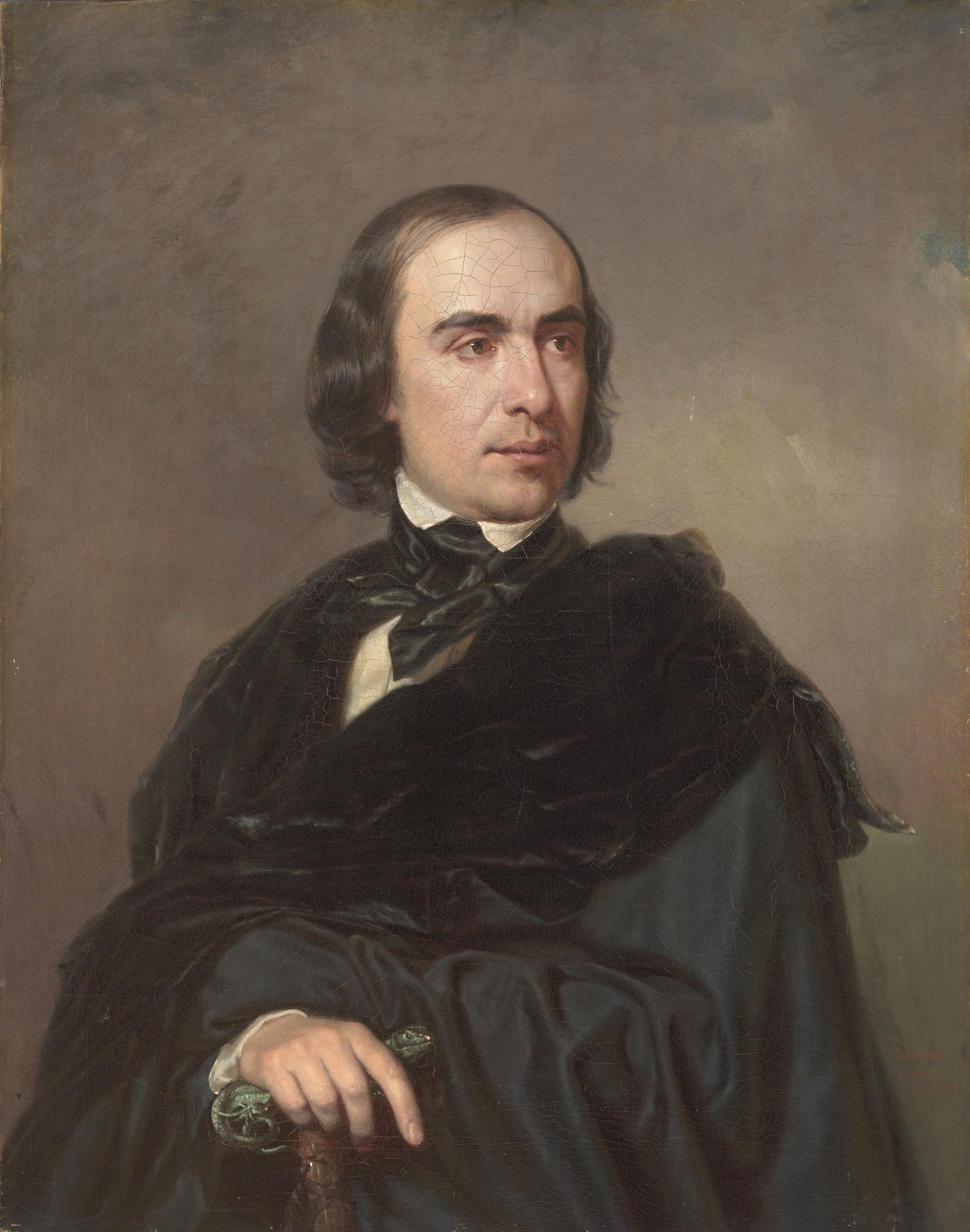
Portrait of Timofey Granovsky by Pyotr Zakharov-Chechenets, 1845

Timofey Nikolayevich Granovsky (Russian: Тимофей Николаевич Грановский; (Note: Тимоѳей Николаевичъ Грановскій in pre-revolution Russian orthography) 9 March 1813 – 4 October 1855) was a founder of medieval studies in the Russian Empire.

Granovsky was born in Oryol, Russia. He studied at the universities of Moscow and Berlin, where he was profoundly influenced by Hegelian ideas of Leopold von Ranke and Friedrich Carl von Savigny. He felt that the Western history was superior to that of his own country and became the first Russian to deliver courses on the medieval history of Western Europe (1839). Due to the strict censorship of the period, Granovsky assumed that lecturing provided a surer way of disseminating Western ideals in Russia than writing. His major printed work was his doctoral dissertation of 1849, Abbat Sugerii (Abbot Suger), in which he "portrayed the great abbot as the architect of royal centralization." His master's thesis of 1845, "Volin, Yumsberg, i Vineta" (Wolin, Jomsborg, and Vineta), attempted to disprove the historicity of Vineta and was very controversial, offending the Slavophiles.

His readings in the Moscow University were immensely popular and brought him in touch with other Westernizers. One of these, Alexander Herzen, described Granovsky's lectures as "a draught of freedom in Nicholas I's Russia".

Fyodor Dostoyevsky's novel Demons features a character, Stepan Trofimovich Verkhovensky, that is partly based on Granovsky. According to Edward Alan Cole, this "liberal who unwittingly inspired a generation of nihilists is unfair to Granovsky but is nevertheless another tribute to his importance as an inspiring teacher and a man of his age."
