= Yekaterina Bakunina =

Russian nurse (1810–1894)

Ekaterina Bakunina
- Екатерина Бакунина
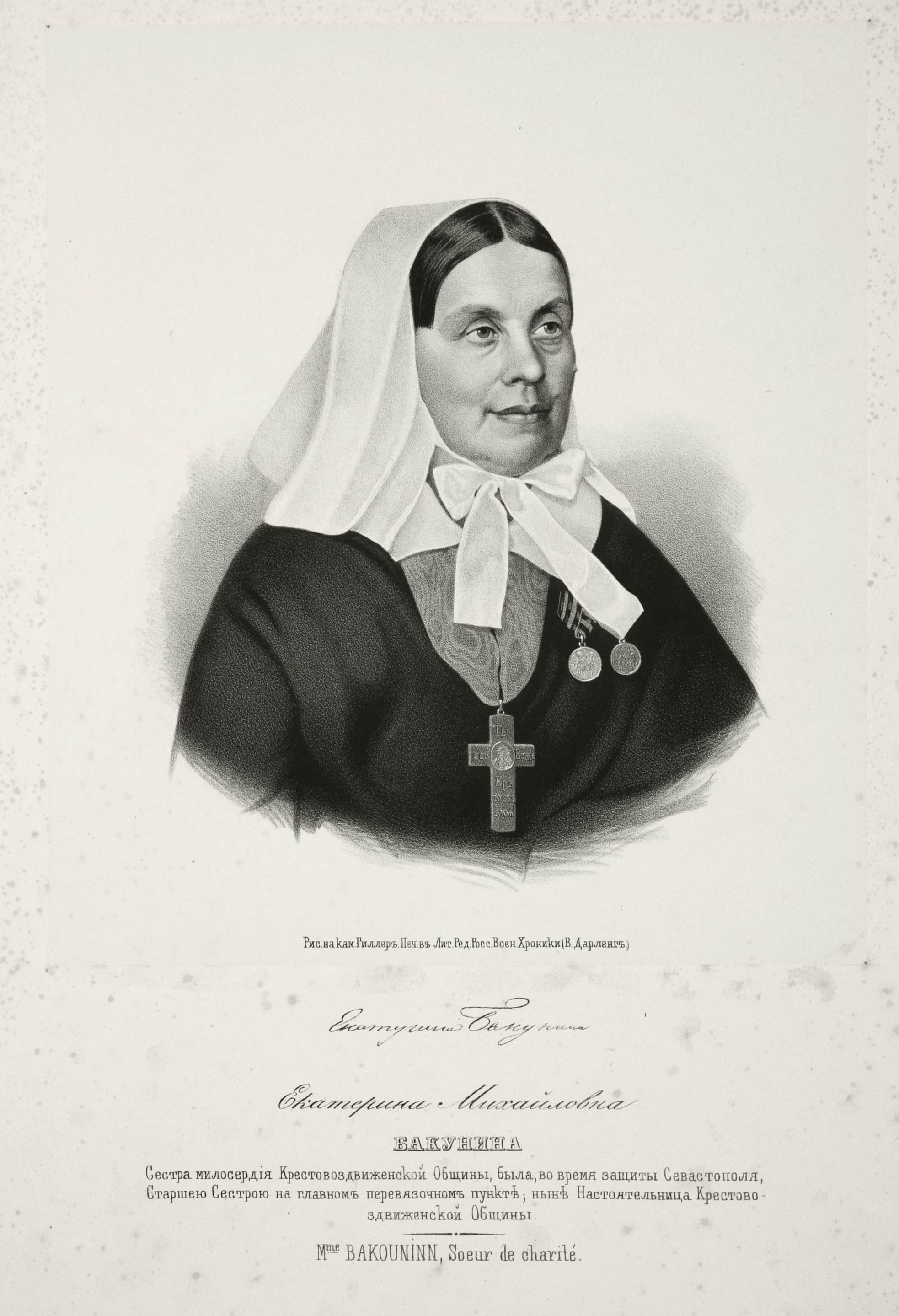
- Born: September 1, 1810; St. Petersburg, Russia
- Died: December 6, 1894 (aged 84); Kazitsino, Russia
- Occupation: Nurse

Yekaterina Mikhailovna Bakunina (Russian: Екатери́на Миха́йловна Баку́нина; September 13 [O.S. September 1] 1810 – May 18 [O.S. May 6] 1894) was a Russian nurse during the Crimean War, who contributed to the foundation of nursing in Russia with her colleague Nikolay Pirogov.

Bakunina became a nurse and traveled to Crimea after a call for volunteers by Grand Duchess Elena Pavlovna and is remembered for her care of wounded soldiers, and leadership among the volunteer nurses of the Russian army.

She is often compared to Florence Nightingale, who was also a volunteer nurse in the Crimean War for the British army, because of her similar contributions to the profession of nursing, earning her the nickname "Russian Nightingale".

== Sources ==
- "Бакунины, дворянский род" . Brockhaus and Efron Encyclopedic Dictionary (in Russian). 1906.
