= Pryamukhino =

Rural locality in Tver Oblast, Russia

Pryamukhino Прямухино
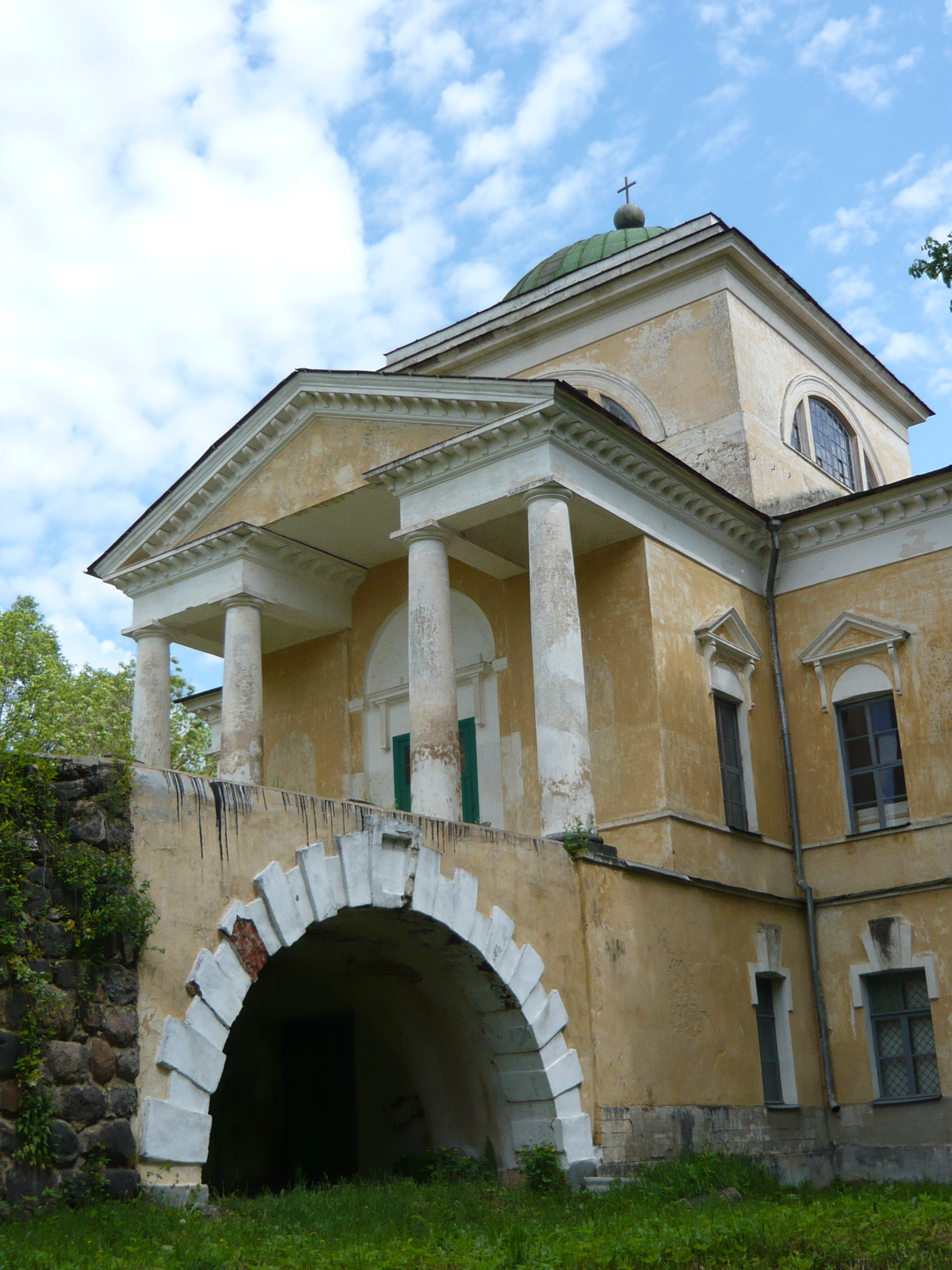
- Trinity Church in Pryamukhino
- Interactive map of Pryamukhino
- Coordinates: 56°56′16″N 34°27′10″E
- Country: Russia
- Oblast: Tver
- Raion: Kuvshinovsky
- Rural settlement: Pryamukhinskoe

Population (2010)
  - Total: 223
- Time zone: UTC+3:00
- Postal code: 172101

Pryamukhino (Russian: Прямухино) is a village in Kuvshinovsky District, Tver Oblast, Russia.

== Geography ==
Pryamukhino is located on the Osuga River, which flows towards the provincial capital of Tver.

== History ==
In 1779, the estate of Pryamukhino was acquired by Mikhail Vasilyevich Bakunin, a minor member of the Russian nobility who had risen through the Table of Ranks to become a State Councillor for Catherine the Great. Lacking in any further political ambition, Bakunin retired to Pryamukhino, where he raised three sons and five daughters. In 1803, Mikhail Vasilyevich Bakunin died, leaving the estate under the management of his third son, Alexander Bakunin.

Mikhail Bakunin was born there.

== Bibliography ==
- Carr, E. H. (1975) [1937]. Michael Bakunin. London: Macmillan Press. doi:10.1007/978-1-349-02632-6. ISBN 978-1349026326. OCLC 1004387682. SBN 333 18425 4.
