= Administrative divisions of Tver Oblast =

Tver Oblast Russia
- Administrative center: Tver

Administrative structure (as of 2013)
- Districts: 36
- Cities/towns: 23
- Urban-type settlements: 28
- Selsovets, rural okrugs, and rural settlements: 313

Municipal structure (as of 2002)
- Rural settlements: 9,509 (inhabited); 1,411 (uninhabited)

Administratively, Tver Oblast is divided into two urban-type settlements under the federal government management, five cities and towns of oblast significance, and thirty-six districts.

In terms of the population, the biggest administrative district is Konakovsky District (87,125 in 2010), the smallest one is Molokovsky District (5,235) and Lesnoy District (5,252).

In terms of the area, the biggest administrative district is Kalininsky District (4,245 square kilometres (1,639 mi^{2})), the smallest ones are Kesovogorsky District (962 square kilometres (371 mi^{2})) and Sonkovsky District (970 square kilometres (370 mi^{2})).

== Administrative divisions ==
Administrative districts of Tver Oblast. The numbers denote the following districts: 1- Andreapolsky, 2 - Bezhetsky, 3 - Belsky, 4 - Bologovsky, 5 - Vesyegonsky, 6 - Vyshnevolotsky, 7 - Zharkovsky, 8 - Zapadnodvinsky, 9 - Zubtsovsky, 10 - Kalininsky, 11 - Kalyazinsky, 12 - Kashinsky, 13 - Kesovogorsky, 14 - Kimrsky, 15 - Konakovsky, 16 - Krasnokholmsky, 17 - Kuvshinovsky, 18 - Lesnoy, 19 - Likhoslavlsky, 20 - Maksatikhinsky, 21 - Molokovsky, 22 - Nelidovsky, 23 - Oleninsky, 24 - Ostashkovsky, 25 - Penovsky, 26 - Rameshkovsky, 27 - Rzhevsky, 28 - Sandovsky, 29 - Selizharovsky, 30 - Sonkovsky, 31 - Spirovsky, 32 - Staritsky, 33 - Torzhoksky, 34 - Toropetsky, 35 - Udomelsky, 36 - Firovsky.

- Urban-type settlements under the federal government management:
  - Ozyorny (Озёрный)
  - Solnechny (Солнечный)
- Cities and towns under the oblast's jurisdiction:
  - Tver (Тверь) (administrative center)
    - City districts:
      - Moskovsky (Московский)
      - Proletarsky (Пролетарский)
      - Tsentralny (Центральный)
      - Zavolzhsky (Заволжский)
  - Kimry (Кимры)
  - Rzhev (Ржев)
  - Torzhok (Торжок)
  - Vyshny Volochyok (Вышний Волочёк)
- Districts:
  - Andreapolsky (Андреапольский)
    - Towns under the district's jurisdiction:
      - Andreapol (Андреаполь)
    - with 7 rural okrugs under the district's jurisdiction.
  - Belsky (Бельский)
    - Towns under the district's jurisdiction:
      - Bely (Белый)
    - with 6 rural okrugs under the district's jurisdiction.
  - Bezhetsky (Бежецкий)
    - Towns under the district's jurisdiction:
      - Bezhetsk (Бежецк)
    - with 13 rural okrugs under the district's jurisdiction.
  - Bologovsky (Бологовский)
    - Towns under the district's jurisdiction:
      - Bologoye (Бологое)
    - Urban-type settlements under the district's jurisdiction:
      - Kuzhenkino (Куженкино)
    - with 9 rural okrugs under the district's jurisdiction.
  - Firovsky (Фировский)
    - Urban-type settlements under the district's jurisdiction:
      - Firovo (Фирово)
      - Velikooktyabrsky (Великооктябрьский)
    - with 3 selsovets under the district's jurisdiction.
  - Kalininsky (Калининский)
    - Urban-type settlements under the district's jurisdiction:
      - Orsha (Орша)
      - Sukhoverkovo (Суховерково)
      - Vasilyevsky Mokh (Васильевский Мох)
    - with 15 rural okrugs under the district's jurisdiction.
  - Kalyazinsky (Калязинский)
    - Towns under the district's jurisdiction:
      - Kalyazin (Калязин)
    - with 4 selsovets under the district's jurisdiction.
  - Kashinsky (Кашинский)
    - Towns under the district's jurisdiction:
      - Kashin (Кашин)
    - with 11 selsovets under the district's jurisdiction.
  - Kesovogorsky (Кесовогорский)
    - Urban-type settlements under the district's jurisdiction:
      - Kesova Gora (Кесова Гора)
    - with 6 selsovets under the district's jurisdiction.
  - Kimrsky (Кимрский)
    - Urban-type settlements under the district's jurisdiction:
      - Bely Gorodok (Белый Городок)
    - with 13 selsovets under the district's jurisdiction.
  - Konakovsky (Конаковский)
    - Towns under the district's jurisdiction:
      - Konakovo (Конаково)
    - Urban-type settlements under the district's jurisdiction:
      - Izoplit (Изоплит)
      - Kozlovo (Козлово)
      - Novozavidovsky (Новозавидовский)
      - Radchenko (Радченко)
      - Redkino (Редкино)
    - with 10 rural settlements under the district's jurisdiction.
  - Krasnokholmsky (Краснохолмский)
    - Towns under the district's jurisdiction:
      - Krasny Kholm (Красный Холм)
    - with 9 selsovets under the district's jurisdiction.
  - Kuvshinovsky (Кувшиновский)
    - Towns under the district's jurisdiction:
      - Kuvshinovo (Кувшиново)
    - with 12 selsovets under the district's jurisdiction.
  - Lesnoy (Лесной)
    - with 4 selsovets under the district's jurisdiction.
  - Likhoslavlsky (Лихославльский)
    - Towns under the district's jurisdiction:
      - Likhoslavl (Лихославль)
    - Urban-type settlements under the district's jurisdiction:
      - Kalashnikovo (Калашниково)
    - with 10 selsovets under the district's jurisdiction.
  - Maksatikhinsky (Максатихинский)
    - Urban-type settlements under the district's jurisdiction:
      - Maksatikha (Максатиха)
    - with 12 selsovets under the district's jurisdiction.
  - Molokovsky (Молоковский)
    - Urban-type settlements under the district's jurisdiction:
      - Molokovo (Молоково)
    - with 5 selsovets under the district's jurisdiction.
  - Nelidovsky (Нелидовский)
    - Towns under the district's jurisdiction:
      - Nelidovo (Нелидово)
    - with 5 selsovets under the district's jurisdiction.
  - Oleninsky (Оленинский)
    - Urban-type settlements under the district's jurisdiction:
      - Olenino (Оленино)
    - with 6 selsovets under the district's jurisdiction.
  - Ostashkovsky (Осташковский)
    - Towns under the district's jurisdiction:
      - Ostashkov (Осташков)
    - with 11 selsovets under the district's jurisdiction.
  - Penovsky (Пеновский)
    - Urban-type settlements under the district's jurisdiction:
      - Peno (Пено)
    - with 6 selsovets under the district's jurisdiction.
  - Rameshkovsky (Рамешковский)
    - Urban-type settlements under the district's jurisdiction:
      - Rameshki (Рамешки)
    - with 10 selsovets under the district's jurisdiction.
  - Rzhevsky (Ржевский)
    - with 8 selsovets under the district's jurisdiction.
  - Sandovsky (Сандовский)
    - Urban-type settlements under the district's jurisdiction:
      - Sandovo (Сандово)
    - with 5 selsovets under the district's jurisdiction.
  - Selizharovsky (Селижаровский)
    - Urban-type settlements under the district's jurisdiction:
      - Selizharovo (Селижарово)
    - with 11 selsovets under the district's jurisdiction.
  - Sonkovsky (Сонковский)
    - Urban-type settlements under the district's jurisdiction:
      - Sonkovo (Сонково)
    - with 7 selsovets under the district's jurisdiction.
  - Spirovsky (Спировский)
    - Urban-type settlements under the district's jurisdiction:
      - Spirovo (Спирово)
    - with 4 selsovets under the district's jurisdiction.
  - Staritsky (Старицкий)
    - Towns under the district's jurisdiction:
      - Staritsa (Старица)
    - with 8 rural settlements under the district's jurisdiction.
  - Toropetsky (Торопецкий)
    - Towns under the district's jurisdiction:
      - Toropets (Торопец)
    - with 11 selsovets under the district's jurisdiction.
  - Torzhoksky (Торжокский)
    - with 22 selsovets under the district's jurisdiction.
  - Udomelsky (Удомельский)
    - Towns under the district's jurisdiction:
      - Udomlya (Удомля)
    - with 12 selsovets under the district's jurisdiction.
  - Vesyegonsky (Весьегонский)
    - Towns under the district's jurisdiction:
      - Vesyegonsk (Весьегонск)
    - with 7 rural okrugs under the district's jurisdiction.
  - Vyshnevolotsky (Вышневолоцкий)
    - Urban-type settlements under the district's jurisdiction:
      - Krasnomaysky (Красномайский)
    - with 14 rural okrugs under the district's jurisdiction.
  - Zapadnodvinsky (Западнодвинский)
    - Towns under the district's jurisdiction:
      - Zapadnaya Dvina (Западная Двина)
    - Urban-type settlements under the district's jurisdiction:
      - Staraya Toropa (Старая Торопа)
  - Zharkovsky (Жарковский)
    - Urban-type settlements under the district's jurisdiction:
      - Zharkovsky (Жарковский)
    - with 5 rural okrugs under the district's jurisdiction.
  - Zubtsovsky (Зубцовский)
    - Towns under the district's jurisdiction:
      - Zubtsov (Зубцов)
    - with 7 rural okrugs under the district's jurisdiction.

== Municipal divisions ==
The municipal divisions of Tver Oblast are identical with its administrative divisions. All of the administrative districts of Tver Oblast are municipally incorporated as municipal districts, and the cities of oblast significance are municipally incorporated as urban okrugs.

== History ==
=== Before 1918 ===
December 29 [O.S. December 18], 1708 Tsar Peter the Great issued an edict which established seven governorates. The description of the borders of the governorates was not given; instead, their area was defined as a set of towns and the lands adjacent to those towns. The present area of Tver oblast was split between Ingermanland Governorate, which was renamed Saint Petersburg Governorate in 1710, Moscow Governorate, and Smolensk Governorate. The governorates were subdivided into uyezds, and uyezds into volosts. In 1713, Smolensk Governorate was abolished and split between Moscow and Riga Governorates; in 1726, it was re-established. In 1727, a separate Novgorod Governorate was established, and the areas within present Tver Oblast, belonging to Saint Petersburg Governorate, were transferred to Novgorod and Moscow Governorates. It was subdivided into five provinces, and the current area of Tver Oblast belonged to two of them — Tver Province and Velikiye Luki Province. The rest of the current area of the oblast belonged to Uglich Province of Moscow Governorate and Belsky Uyezd of Smolensk Governorate.

In 1775-1776, the administrative reform abolished governorates and created viceroyalties. The current area of Tver Oblast was divided between Tver, Novgorod, Pskov, and Smolensk Viceroyalties. In 1796, the viceroyalties were abolished, and transformed back into eponymous governorates.

In the 19th century, the area was divided between the following uyezds,

- Bezhetsky Uyezd of Tver Governorate (since 1775, the administrative center in Bezhetsk);
- Kashinsky Uyezd of Tver Governorate (since 1775, Kashin);
- Novotorzhsky Uyezd of Tver Governorate (since 1775, Torzhok);
- Ostashkovsky Uyezd of Tver Governorate (since 1775, Ostashkov);
- Rzhevsky Uyezd of Tver Governorate (since 1775, Rzhev);
- Staritsky Uyezd of Tver Governorate (since 1775, Staritsa);
- Tverskoy Uyezd of Tver Governorate (since 1775, Tver);
- Vyshnevolotsky Uyezd of Tver Governorate (since 1775, Vyshny Volochyok);
- Zubtsovsky Uyezd of Tver Governorate (since 1775, Zubtsov);
- Kalyazinsky Uyezd of Tver Governorate (from 1775 till 1796 and from 1803, Kalyazin)
- Korchevskoy Uyezd of Tver Governorate (from 1781 till 1796 and from 1803, Korcheva)
- Vesyegonsky Uyezd of Tver Governorate (from 1775 till 1796 and from 1803, Vesyegonsk)
- Valdaysky Uyezd of Novgorod Governorate (since 1770, Valday);
- Toropetsky Uyezd of Pskov Governorate (since 1777, Toropets);
- Belsky Uyezd of Smolensk Governorate (since 1708, Bely);
- Porechsky Uyezd of Smolensk Governorate (since 1775, Porechye).

Minor areas also belonged to Kholmsky Uyezd of Novgorod Governorate, Velizhsky Uyezd of Vitebsk Governorate, and to Myshkinsky Uyezd of Yaroslavl Governorate.

=== 1918—1935 ===
On 10 March 1918, Krasnokholmsky Uyezd with the center in Krasny Kholm was established. On 28 December 1918 Kimrsky Uyezd with the center of Kimry was established as well. On 25 April 1921, Vesyegonsky and Krasnokholmsky Uyezds were transferred to newly established Rybinsk Governorate. In 1921, there was some minor land exchange between Tver Governorate and Moscow and Rybinsk Governorates. On 23 February 1923, Rybinsk Governorate was abolished, and the uyezds were transferred back to Tver Governorate.

On 30 May 1922, Zubtsovsky, Kalyazinsky, and Korchevskoy Uyezds were abolished and merged into Rzhevsky, Kashinsky, and Kimrsky Uyezds, respectively.

On 1 August 1927 Novgorod and Pskov Governorates were abolished, and their uyezds were merged into newly established Leningrad Oblast, with the administrative center in Leningrad, which included the northwestern part of Russian Federation. The oblast was subdidived into 140 districts, which were grouped into nine okrugs. The areas which currently belong to Tver Oblast were grouped into Velikiye Luki Okrug with the center in Velikiye Luki.

The following districts have been established in Velikiye Luki Okrug, Bologovsky, Idritsky, Ilyinsky, Kholmsky, Kunyinsky, Leninsky, Loknyansky, Nasvinsky, Nevelsky, Novosokolnichesky, Oktyabrsky, Ostashkovsky, Penovsky, Porechyevsky, Pustoshkinsky, Rykovsky, Sebezhsky, Sovetsky, Toropetsky, Troitsky, Tsevelsky, Usmynsky, Ust-Dolyssky, Usvyatsky, Velizhsky, and Velikoluksky.

Bologovsky District was established and included into Borovichi Okrug of Leningrad Oblast.

On 12 July 1929 Moscow and Smolensk Governorates were abolished as well. Their uyezds formed a number of administrative divisions, and current area of Tver Oblast overlapped with two of them, Moscow and Western Oblasts. Western Oblast had the administrative center in Smolensk. These oblasts were subdivided into okrugs as well. Velikiye Luki Okrug was transferred from Leningrad to Western Oblast; additionally, Rzhev Okrug with the center in Rzhev was established in Western Oblast, and most of its area later entered Tver Oblast. The following districts were established in Rzhev Okrug, Belsky, Kamensky, Karmanovsky, Lukovnikovsky, Molodotudsky, Nelidovsky, Oleninsky, Pogorelsky, Rzhevsky, Selizharovsky, Staritsky, Stepurinsky, Sychyovsky, Vysokovsky, Yeltsovsky, and Zubtsovsky.

In Moscow Oblast, three of the okrugs were established in the areas which later formed Tver Oblast. They contained the following districts:

- Bezhetsk Okrug: Bezhetsky, Kashinsky, Kesovsky, Krasnokholmsky, Maksatikhinsky, Mikhaylovsky, Molokovsky, Sandovsky, Sonkovsky, and Vesyegonsky.
- Kimry Okrug: Goritsky, Kalyazinsky, Kimrsky, Konstantinovsky, Kuznetsovsky, Leninsky, and Nerlsky.
- Tver Okrug: Likhoslavlsky, Novotorzhsky, Rameshkovsky, Spirovsky, Tolmachyovsky, Turginovsky, Tverskoy, Udomelsky, Vyshnevolotsky, Yemelyanovsky, Yesenovsky, and Zavidovsky.

On 23 July 1930, the okrugs were abolished, and the districts became directly subordinate to the oblasts. On 20 November 1931, Tver was renamed Kalinin.

=== After 1935 ===
On 29 January 1935 Kalinin Oblast was established on the areas which previously belonged to Moscow, Western and Leningrad Oblasts. The city of Kalinin became the administrative center of the oblast.

Originally, it contained the following districts:

- From Moscow Oblast: Bezhetsky, Kalininsky, Kalyazinsky, Kashinsky, Kesovogorsky, Kimrsky, Konakovsky, Krasnokholmsky, Lesnoy, Maksatikhinsky, Molokovsky, Nerlsky, Novotorzhsky, Rameshkovsky, Sandovsky, Sonkovsky, Spirovsky, Tolmachyovsky, Turginovsky, Udomelsky, Vesyegonsky, Vyshnevolotsky, Yasenovichsky, Yemelyanovsky, and Zavidovsky.
- From Western Oblast: Kamensky, Kholmsky, Leninsky, Loknyansky, Lukovnikovsky, Nevelsky, Nelidovsky, Novosokolnichesky, Oktyabrsky, Oleninsky, Ostashkovsky, Penovsky, Pustoshkinsky, Rzhevsky, Sebezhsky, Selizharovsky, Staritsky, Toropetsky, Velikoluksky, and Zubtsovsky.
- From Leningrad Oblast: Bezhanitsky, Bologovsky, Novorzhevsky, Opochetsky, and Pushkinsky.

Between 9 July 1937 and 7 February 1939, Karelian National Okrug existed as a territory with special status within Kalinin Oblast. It was intended to be a Tver Karelians autonomy. The okrug consisted of Kozlovsky, Likhoslavlsky, Maksatikhinsky, Novokarelsky, and Rameshkovsky Districts. Its administrative center was located in the town of Likhoslavl.

On March 5, 1935, Velikiye Luki Okrug, one of the okrugs abutting the boundaries of the Soviet Union, was established. It consisted of Bezhanitsky, Loknyansky, Nevelsky, Novorzhevsky, Novosokolnichesky, Opochetsky, Pustoshkinsky, Pushkinsky, Sebezhsky, and Velikoluksky Districts. On May 11, 1937, the okrug was split into Velikiye Luki and Opochka Okrugs. On 4 May 1938 Velikoluksky Okrug was abolished, and on 5 February 1941 Opochetsky Okrug was abolished as well. The districts were directly subordinated by the oblast.

During World War II, between 1941 and 1944, the western part of the oblas were occupied by German troops.

On 22 August 1944, Velikiye Luki Oblast was established, and on 23 August 1944, Pskov Oblast was established, to administrate areas of Soviet Union previously occupied by German troops and liberated in the course of World War II. A number of districts were transferred from Tver Oblast to these two oblasts,

- Ashevsky, Novorzhevsky, and Pushkinsky Districts were transferred to Pskov Oblast;
- Bezhanitsky, Idritsky, Krasnogorodsky, Kudeversky, Kunyinsky, Leninsky, Loknyansky, Nevelsky, Nelidovsky, Novosokolnichesky, Oktyabrsky, Opochetsky, Penovsky, Ploskoshsky, Pustoshkinsky, Sebezhsky, Seryozhnisky, Toropetsky, and Velikoluksky Districts were transferred to Velikiye Luki Oblast.
- Kholmsky District was initially transferred to Novgorod Oblast, but on 22 August 1944 it was transferred to Velikiye Luki Oblast.

On 2 October 1957 Velikiye Luki Oblast was abolished. Its area was split between Kalinin and Pskov Oblasts. Belsky, Ilyinsky, Leninsky, Nelidovsky, Oktyabrsky, Penovsky, Seryozhinsky, Toropetsky, and Zharkovsky Districts were transferred to Kalinin Oblast, and all other districts were merged into Pskov Oblast. On 29 July 1958 Ploskoshsky District was transferred from Pskov to Kalinin Oblast, which finally set the current borders of Tver Oblast.

In the middle of the 1960s the oblast went through the abortive Khrushchyov administrative reform, when districts were first divided into large-scale agricultural and industrial districts, and several years later these were abolished, and the oblast got a district structure slightly different from that before the reform.

In 1990, Kalinin Oblast was renamed Tver Oblast.

=== Abolished districts ===
After 1927 (with the exception of the aborted reform of 1963-1965) borders between the districts sometimes were modified, and as a result some of the districts were abolished. This list includes the districts which existed in the current area of Tver Oblast.

- Bologovsky District (the administrative center in the selo of Bologovo), Leningrad Oblast, Western Oblast, established in 1927, abolished in 1930, split between Leninsky and Kholmsky Districts;
- Brusovsky District (the settlement of Brusovo), Kalinin Oblast, established in 1936, abolished in 1960, split between Maksatikhinsky and Udomelsky Districts;
- Goritsky District (the selo of Goritsy), Moscow Oblast, Kalinin Oblast, established in 1929, abolished in 1963, merged into Rameshkovsky District;
- Ilyinsky District (the selo of Ilyino), Leningrad Oblast, Western Oblast, Kalinin Oblast, Velikiye Luki Oblast, Kalinin Oblast, established in 1927, abolished in 1960, merged into Oktyabrsky District;
- Kozlovsky District (the selo of Kozlovo), Kalinin Oblast, established in 1937, abolished in 1956, split between Maksatikhinsky and Spirovsky Districts;
- Kushalinsky District (the selo of Kushalino), Kalinin Oblast, established in 1935, abolished in 1956, split between Kalininsky, Goritsky, and Rameshkovsky Districts;
- Leninsky District (the selo of Khotilitsy, since 1928 in Andreapol), Leningrad Oblast, Western Oblast, Kalinin Oblast, Velikiye Luki Oblast, Kalinin Oblast, established in 1927, abolished in 1963, merged into Toropetsky District;
- Lukovnikovsky District (the selo of Lukovnikovo), Moscow Oblast, Kalinin Oblast, established in 1929, abolished in 1960, split between Kirovsky, Novotorzhsky, Rzhevsky, and Staritsky Districts;
- Mednovsky District (the selo of Mednoye), Kalinin Oblast, established in 1935, abolished in 1956, split between Kalininsky and Novotorzhsky Districts;
- Molodotudsky District (the selo of Molodoy Tud), Moscow Oblast, established in 1929, abolished in 1932; re-established in 1935 as Chertolinsky District (the administrative center in the selo of Chertolino), Kalinin Oblast; in 1936 the district center moved to Molodoy Tud, and the district renamed Molodotudsky; abolished in 1958, split between Kirovsky, Oleninsky, and Rzhevsky Districts;
- Nerlsky District (the selo of Nerl), Moscow Oblast, Kalinin Oblast, established in 1929, abolished in 1956, merged into Kalyazinsky District;
- Oktyabrsky District (the selo of Staraya Toropa, later the settlement of Zapadnaya Dvina), Leningrad Oblast, Western Oblast, Kalinin Oblast, Velikiye Luki Oblast, Kalinin Oblast, established in 1927, abolished in 1963, merged with Nelidovsky District into Zapadnodvinsky District.
- Orshinsky District (the selo of Rozhdestveno), Kalinin Oblast, established in 1937, abolished in 1959, split between Konakovsky, Kalininsky, and Goritsky Districts;
- Ovinishchensky District (the selo of Kesma), Kalinin Oblast, established in 1935, abolished in 1956, split between Krasnokholmsky and Vesyegonsky Districts;
- Ploskoshsky District (the selo of Ploskosh), Kalinin Oblast, Velikiye Luki Oblast, Pskov Oblast, Kalinin Oblast, established in 1936, abolished in 1960, merged into Toropetsky District;
- Pogorelsky District (the selo of Pogoreloye Gorodishche), Moscow Oblast, Kalinin Oblast, established in 1929, abolished in 1934, re-established in 1935, abolished in 1960, merged into Zubtsovsky District;
- Rozhdestvensky District (the selo of Rozhdestvo), Leningrad Oblast, established in 1927, abolished in 1931, merged into Bologovsky District;
- Seryozhinsky District (the selo of Bologovo), Kalinin Oblast, Velikiye Luki Oblast, Kalinin Oblast, established in 1936, abolished in 1957, split between Leninsky and Toropetsky Districts;
- Tebleshsky District (the selo of Kiverichi), Kalinin Oblast, established in 1935, abolished in 1956, split between Bezhetsky and Goritsky Districts;
- Tolmachyovsky District (the selo of Tolmachi), Moscow Oblast, Kalinin Oblast, established in 1929, renamed Novokarelsky in 1935, abolished in 1956, split between Likhoslavlsky and Spirovsky Districts;
- Turginovsky District (the selo of Turginovo), Moscow Oblast, Kalinin Oblast, established in 1929, abolished in 1963, merged into Kalininsky District;
- Uglovsky District (the railway station of Uglovka), Leningrad Oblast, established in 1927, abolished in 1932, split between Bologovsky, Borovichsky, and Okulovsky Districts;
- Vysokovsky District (the settlement of Vysokoye), Moscow Oblast, Kalinin Oblast, established in 1929, abolished in 1930, re-established in 1936, abolished in 1963, merged into Staritsky District;
- Yemelyanovsky District (the selo of Yesenovichi), Moscow Oblast, Kalinin Oblast, established in 1929, abolished in 1958, split between Vyshnevolotsky, Novotorzhsky, Kamensky, and Firovsky Districts;
- Yesenovichsky District (the selo of Yemelyanovo), Moscow Oblast, Kalinin Oblast, established in 1929, abolished in 1956, split between Kalininsky, Staritsky, Turginovky, and Vysokovsky Districts;
- Zavidovsky District (the urban-type settlement of Novozavidovsky), Moscow Oblast, Kalinin Oblast, established in 1929, abolished in 1960, merged into Konakovsky District.

=== Renamed districts ===
Several of the districts were renamed: Tverskoy into Kalininsky, Kuznetsovsky into Konakovsky, Kamensky into Kuvshinovsky, Kirovsky into Selizharovsky; Novotorzhsky into Torzhoksky. Kamensky and Kirovsky Districts were not renamed directly but rather abolished and later re-established under a different name.
