= Radchenko (urban-type settlement) =

Radchenko Радченко
- Work settlement
- Interactive map of Radchenko
- Location of Radchenko Radchenko (Tver Oblast)
- Coordinates: 56°40′49″N 36°22′11″E
- Country: Russia
- Federal subject: Tver Oblast
- Administrative district: Konakovsky District

Population (2010 Census)
  - Total: 1,537
  - Estimate (2021): 1,172 (−23.7%)

Municipal status
  - Municipal district: Konakovsky Municipal District
  - Urban settlement: Urban Settlement Radchenko
  - Capital of: Urban Settlement Radchenko
- Time zone: UTC+3 (MSK)
- Postal code: 171268
- OKTMO ID: 28630172051
- Website: admradchenko.ru

Radchenko (Russian: Ра́дченко) is an urban locality (an urban-type settlement) in Konakovsky District of Tver Oblast, Russia, located on the right bank of the Volga River (the Ivankovo Reservoir). Population: 1,537 (2010 census); 2,089 (2002 census); 2,562 (1989 Soviet census).

== History ==
The settlement was founded in 1921 to serve the Peat Experimental Station, which was later transformed into the Institute of Peat Industry. The settlement was known as TOS, an abbreviation from Peat Experimental Station. At the time, it belonged to Klinsky Uyezd of Moscow Governorate. On July 12 1929, the Governorate was abolished, and TOS was transferred to Moscow Oblast. Uyezds were abolished as well, and Zavidovsky District, with the administrative center in the urban-type settlement of Novozavidovsky, was established within Tver Okrug of Moscow Oblast. Redkino was a part of Zavidovsky District. On July 23, 1930, the okrugs were abolished, and the districts were directly subordinated to the oblast. On January 29, 1935 Kalinin Oblast was established, and Zavidovsky District was transferred to Kalinin Oblast. In 1939, TOS was granted urban-type settlement status. In November and December 1941, during World War II, TOS was occupied by German troops. On November 14, 1960 the district was abolished and merged into Konakovsky District. On February 13, 1963, during the abortive Khrushchyov administrative reform, Konakovsky District was merged into Kalininsky District, but on January 12, 1965 it was re-established.

In 1965, TOS was renamed Radchenko to commemorate Ivan Radchenko, one of the organizers of the peat industry in Russia, who used to live in the settlement. In 1990, Kalinin Oblast was renamed Tver Oblast.

== Economy ==
=== Industry ===
There is a mechanical engineering plant in Radchenko.

=== Transportation ===
The closest railway station is Redkino at the Moscow – Saint Petersburg Railway. It belongs to the Leningradsky suburban railway line and is connected by regular passenger suburban service with both Moscow (Moscow Leningradsky railway station) and Tver.

Radchenko lies on the M10 highway, which connects Moscow and St. Petersburg. There is an additional road connection to Redkino and Izoplit.

The Volga is navigable in Radchenko. Occasionally there is a ferry across the river.

== Culture and recreation ==
Radchenko contains one cultural heritage monument of local significance, which is the former house of Ivan Radchenko.
