= Konakovo =

Town in Tver Oblast, Russia

Konakovo Конаково
- Town
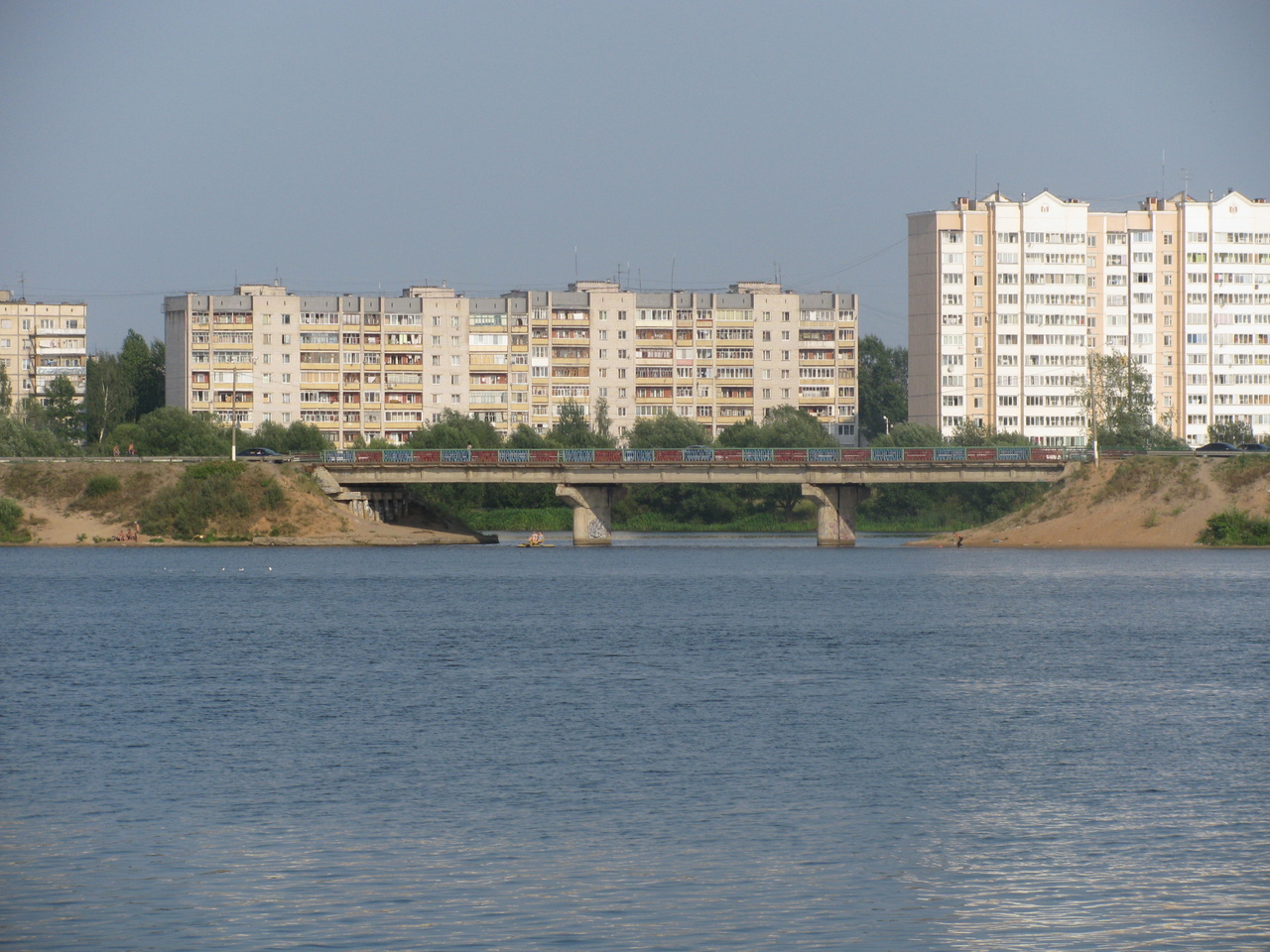
- The Donkhovka River in Konakovo. May 2008.

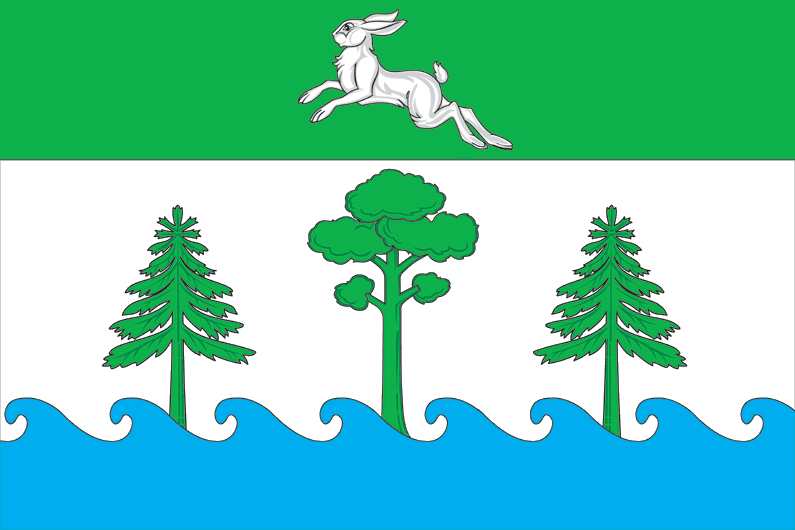
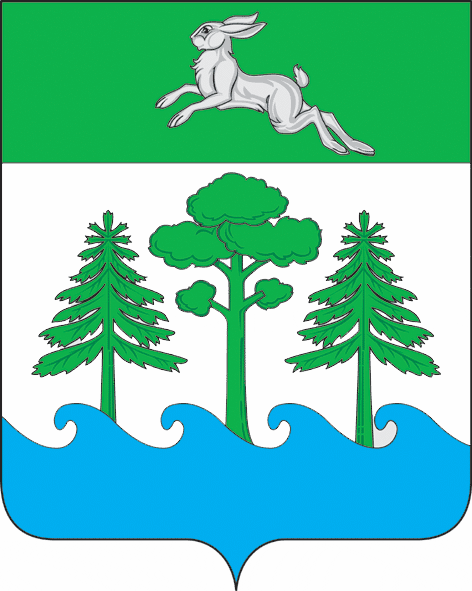
- Flag Coat of arms
- Interactive map of Konakovo
- Location of Konakovo Konakovo (Tver Oblast)
- Coordinates: 56°42′N 36°45′E
- Country: Russia
- Federal subject: Tver Oblast
- Administrative district: Konakovsky District
- Urban settlementSelsoviet: Konakovo
- Founded: 1806
- Town status since: 1937
- Elevation: 130 m (430 ft)

Population (2010 Census)
  - Total: 41,291
  - Estimate (2025): 31,169 (−24.5%)

Administrative status
  - Capital of: Konakovsky District, Konakovo Urban Settlement

Municipal status
  - Municipal district: Konakovsky Municipal District
  - Urban settlement: Konakovo Urban Settlement
  - Capital of: Konakovsky Municipal District, Konakovo Urban Settlement
- Time zone: UTC+3 (MSK)
- Postal code: 171250–171256
- Dialing code: +7 48242
- OKTMO ID: 28630101001
- Website: www.konakovo.in

Konakovo (Russian: Конако́во, IPA: [kənɐˈkovə]) is a town and the administrative center of Konakovsky District in Tver Oblast, Russia, located on the right bank of Ivankovo Reservoir (Volga River). Population: 41,291 (2010 census); 42,335 (2002 census); 42,522 (1989 Soviet census).

== History ==
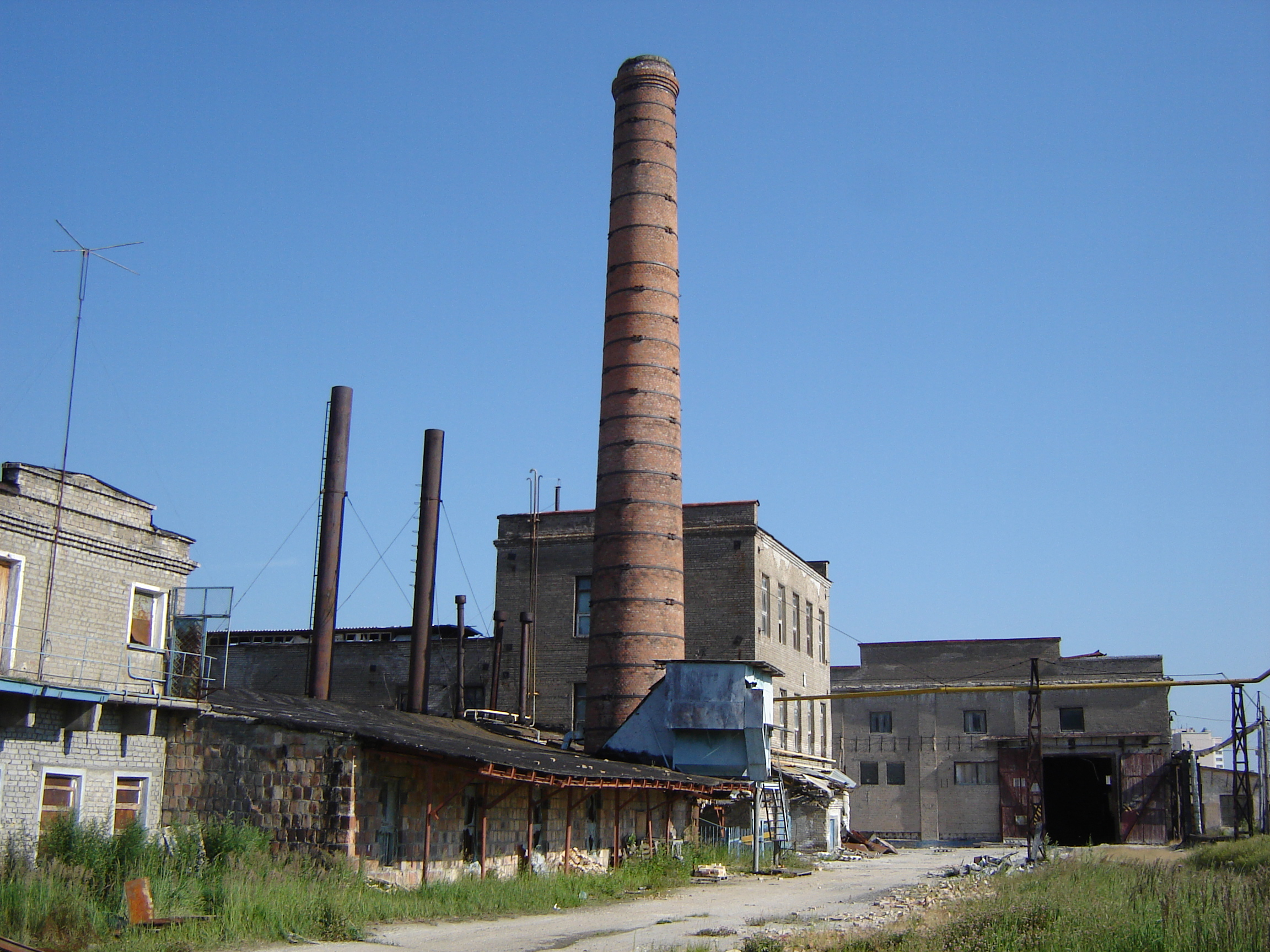
Konakovo Faience Factory

Konakovo was founded in 1806 as the selo of Kuznetsovo (Кузнецо́во). The name originates from the last name Kuznetsov, who was one of the early owners. The selo was not doing very well and was almost deserted by the 1820s. In 1826–1828, a faience factory was transferred there from the village of Domkino, about 30 kilometers (19 mi) east of Kuznetsovo. The factory was built by merchant Auerbach in Domkino on the property which belonged to a local landowner, and by 1829 the lease agreement expired and was not extended. In 1826, Auerbach bought all lands in and around Kuznetsovo. In 1870, the factory was purchased by industrialist Matvey Kuznetsov (unrelated to Kuznetsov who gave the name to the village) and became known as Kuznetsov Faience Factory. After 1918, the factory was nationalized, and one of its specializations was art production. To this end, it established collaboration with many established Russian artists of the time.

At the time, Kuznetsovo was a part of Korchevskoy Uyezd in Tver Governorate. On May 30, 1922, Korchevskoy Uyezd was abolished and merged into Kimrsky Uyezd. On July 14, 1925, Kuznetsovo was granted urban-type settlement status.

On July 12, 1929, Tver Governorate was abolished, and the area was transferred to Moscow Oblast. Uyezds were abolished as well, and Kuznetsovsky District, with the administrative center in the town of Korcheva, was established within Kimry Okrug of Moscow Oblast. On July 23, 1930, the okrugs were abolished and the districts were directly subordinated to the oblast. On February 26, 1930, Kuznetsovo was renamed Konakovo and Kuznetsovsky District was renamed Konakovsky, to commemorate Porfiry Konakov, a participant of the Revolution of 1905. On January 29, 1935, Kalinin Oblast was established, to which Konakovsky District was transferred. In 1937, when the Ivankovo Reservoir was filled, Korcheva was submerged under water. The administrative center of the district was transferred to Konakovo, which was granted town status on March 2, 1937. On February 13, 1963, during the abortive administrative reform by Nikita Khrushchev, Konakovsky District was merged into Kalininsky District, but on January 12, 1965, it was re-established. In 1990, Kalinin Oblast was renamed Tver Oblast.

== Administrative and municipal status ==
Within the framework of administrative divisions, Konakovo serves as the administrative center of Konakovsky District. As an administrative division, it is, together with six rural localities, incorporated within Konakovsky District as Konakovo Urban Settlement. As a municipal division, this administrative unit also has urban settlement status and is a part of Konakovsky Municipal District.

== Economy ==
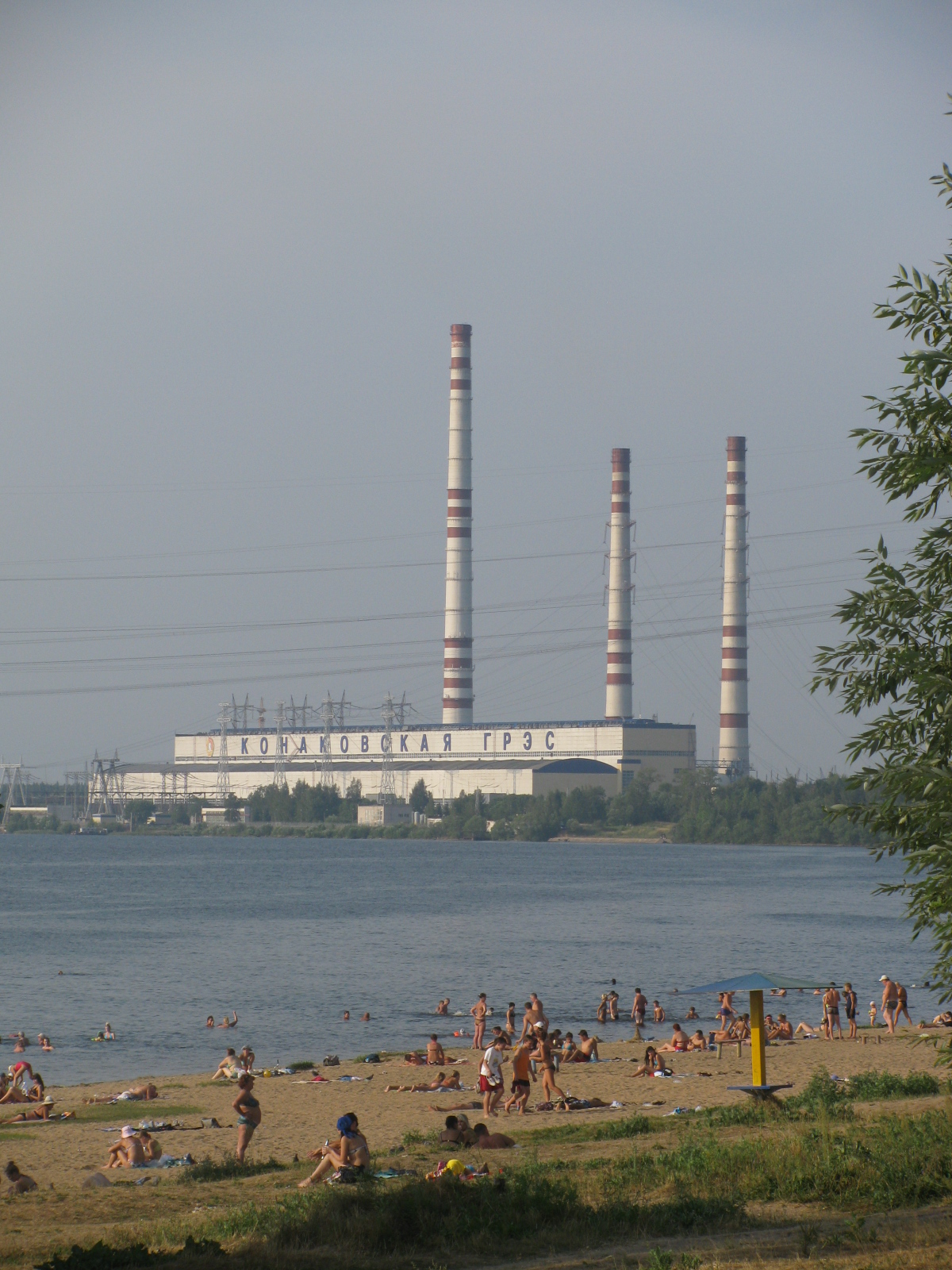
Konakovo Power Station

The Konakovo Power Station, a thermal power plant, is the biggest enterprise in Konakovsky District. In 2008, it produced over 60% of the GDP of the district.

=== Transportation ===
Konakovo has a railway station, Konakovo GRES. It is connected to the Saint Petersburg – Moscow Railway by a line which branches off in Reshetnikovo. It is connected by regular passenger suburban service with Moscow.

Konakovo has road connections to Kimry and to Zavidovo, where it has access to the M10 Highway, which runs between Moscow and St. Petersburg. There are also local roads with the bus traffic.

== Culture and recreation ==
Konakovo contains eight cultural heritage monuments of local significance. They include one of the buildings of the faience factory, the complex of Kuznetsov's dacha, as well as monuments to soldiers fallen in World War II and of people killed during the October Revolution and subsequent events.

The Konakovo District Museum, located in Konakovo, contains exhibitions on the archeology and history of the district.

== Sister Cities ==
- Menomonie, Wisconsin, USA (1994)
- Talachyn, Belarus (2016)
