= Shosha (river) =

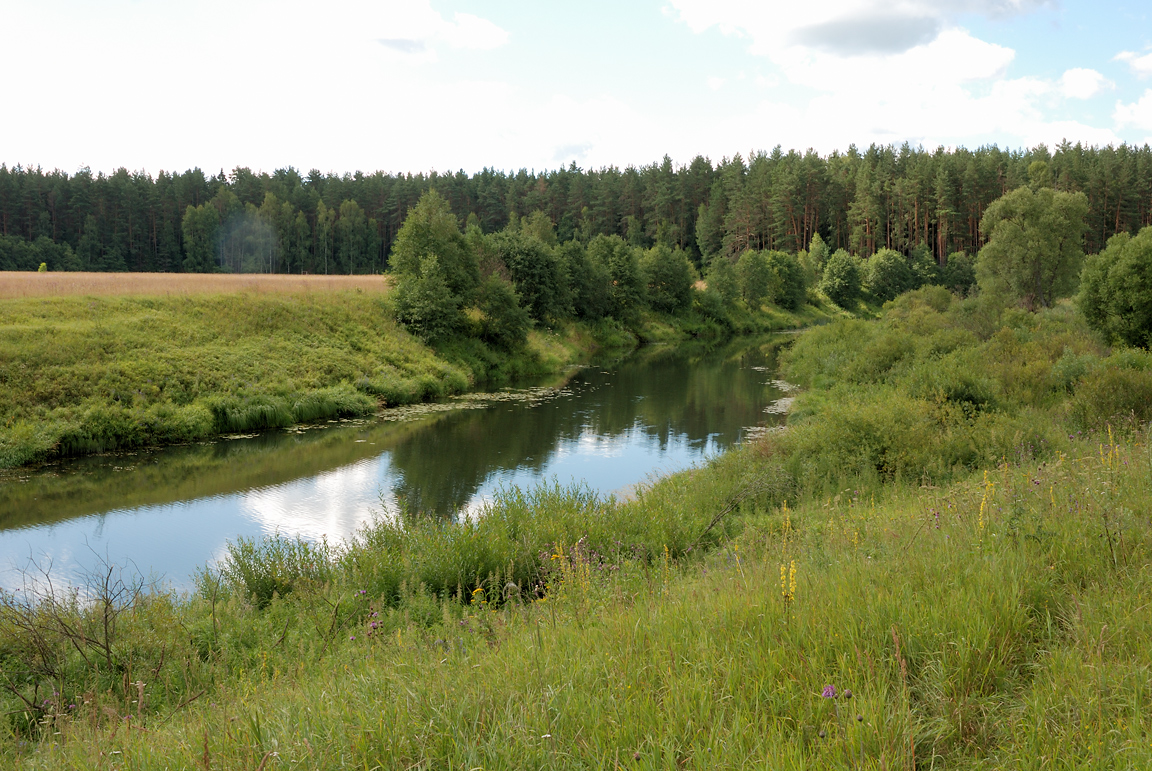
- Native name: Шо́ша (Russian)

Location
- Country: Russia

Physical characteristics
- Mouth: Volga
  - coordinates: 56.6230°N 36.5419°E
- Length: 163 km (101 mi)
- Basin size: 3,080 km^{2} (1,190 sq mi)

Basin features
- Progression: Volga→ Caspian Sea

The Shosha (Russian: Шо́ша) is a river in Zubtsovsky, Staritsky, Kalininsky and Konakovsky districts of Tver Oblast and Lotoshinsky District of Moscow Oblast in Russia. It is a right tributary of the Volga. The length of the Shosha is 163 kilometres (101 mi). The area of its basin is 3,080 square kilometres (1,190 mi^{2}). The river flows into the Ivankovo Reservoir. The Shosha freezes up in November through early January and stays icebound until late March or early April.

The source of the Shosha is in Zubtsovsky District of Tver Oblast, northwest of the selo of Knyazhyi Gory. It flows north, turns northeast, enters Staritsky District and turns north. At the village of Sidorovo the Shosha turns east and crosses two tiny bits of Moscow Oblast, further downstream crossing to Kalininsky District of Tver Oblast. Downstream of the village of Novinki the Shosha enters the Ivankovo Reservoir, where it accepts two of its major tributaries, the Lama (right) and the Inyukha (left). The urban-type settlements of Kozlovo and Novozavidovsky are located at the right bank of the reservoir. The Ivankovo Reservoir is crossed by the dam of the Moscow – Saint Petersburg Railway, and downstream of the dam the Volga enters from the left, at the former location of the mouth of the Shosha before the reservoir was filled in 1937.

The middle course of the Shosha, upstream of Kozlovo, is located in Zavidovo nature reserve, a closed area which is only accessible to high-level state employees.

The drainage basin of the Shosha includes the whole Lotoshinsky District, the southwest of Konakovsky and Kalininsky District, the southeast of Staritsky District, the east of Zubtsovsky District, as well as the northern parts of Volokolamsky and Shakhovskoy Districts of Moscow Oblast, and minor areas in Klinsky and Istrinsky Districts, also in Moscow Oblast. The town of Volokolamsk and the urban-type settlements of Shakhovskaya, Lotoshino, Izoplit, Kozlovo, and Novozavidovsky lie in the drainage basin of the Shosha.
