= Konakovsky District =

Konakovsky District Конаковский район (Russian)
- District
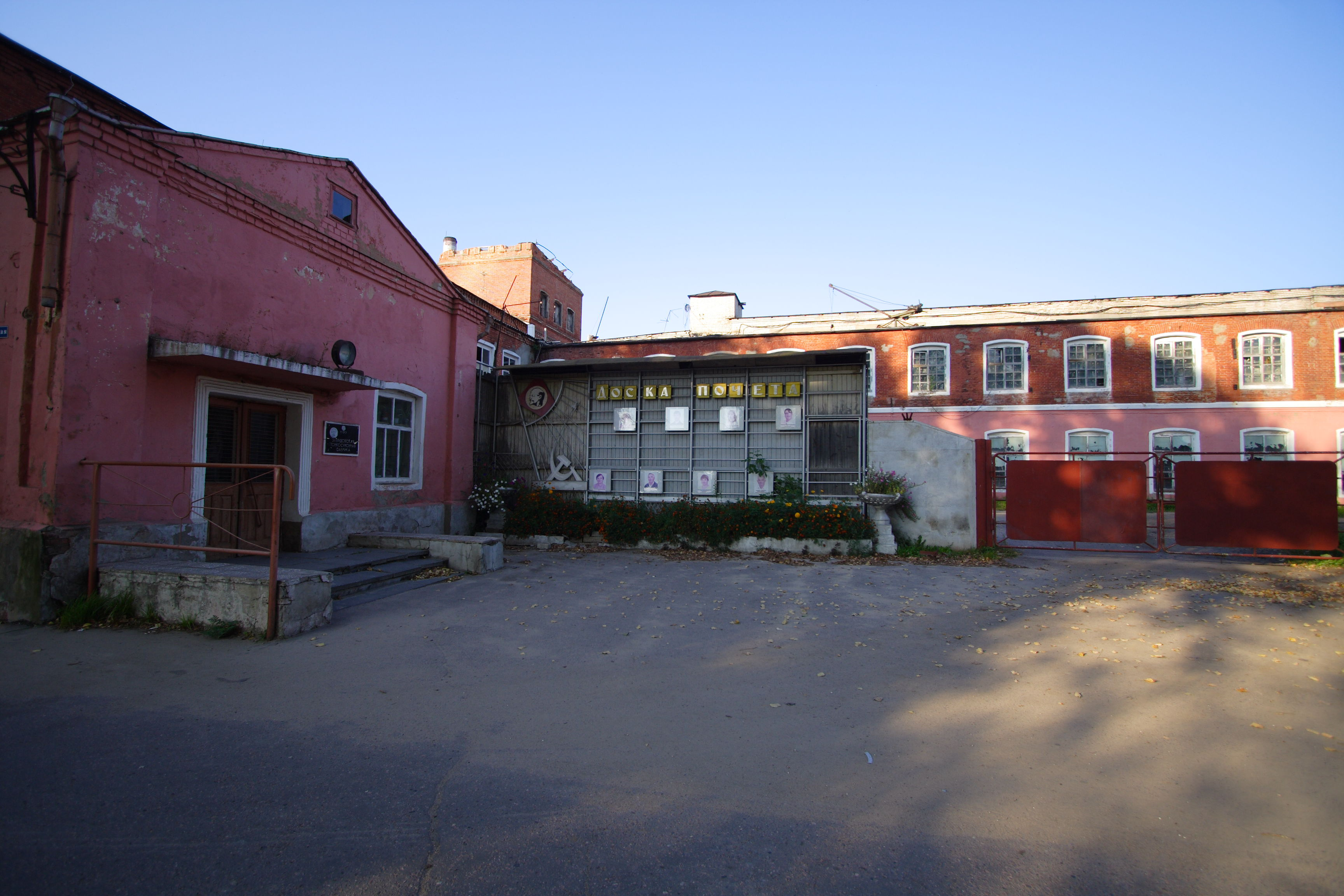
- A clothing factory in the urban-type settlement of Kozlovo in Konakovsky District

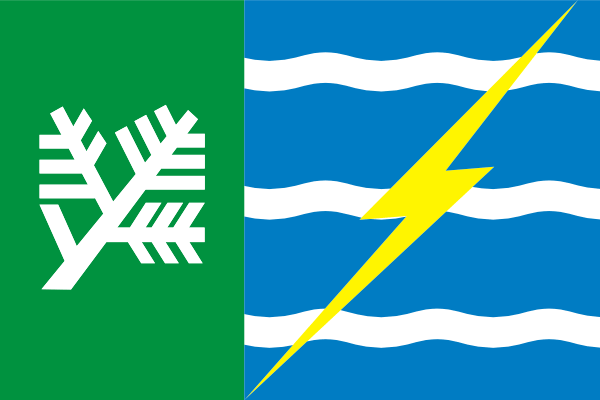
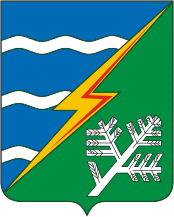
- Flag Coat of arms
- Location of Konakovsky District in Tver Oblast
- Coordinates: 56°42′N 36°47′E
- Country: Russia
- Federal subject: Tver Oblast
- Established: 12 July 1929
- Administrative center: Konakovo

Area
  - Total: 2,114 km^{2} (816 sq mi)

Population (2010 Census)
  - Total: 87,125
  - Density: 41.21/km^{2} (106.7/sq mi)
  - Urban: 77.7%
  - Rural: 22.3%

Administrative structure
  - Administrative divisions: 1 Urban settlements (towns), 5 Urban settlements (urban-type settlements), 10 Rural settlements
  - Inhabited localities: 1 cities/towns, 5 urban-type settlements, 181 rural localities

Municipal structure
  - Municipally incorporated as: Konakovsky Municipal District
  - Municipal divisions: 6 urban settlements, 10 rural settlements
- Time zone: UTC+3 (MSK)
- OKTMO ID: 28630000
- Website: http://konakovoregion.ru/

Konakovsky District (Russian: Конако́вский райо́н) is an administrative and municipal district (raion), one of the thirty-six in Tver Oblast, Russia. It is located in the southeast of the oblast and borders with Kimrsky District in the northeast, the town of Dubna, Moscow Oblast, in the east, Dmitrovsky District of Moscow Oblast in the southeast, Klinsky District of Moscow Oblast in the south, Lotoshinsky District of Moscow Oblast in the southwest, and with Kalininsky District in the northwest. The area of the district is 2,114 square kilometers (816 sq mi). Its administrative center is the town of Konakovo. Population: 87,125 (2010 Census); 49,692 (2002 census); 55,101 (1989 Soviet census). The population of Konakovo accounts for 47.4% of the district's total population.

== Geography ==
Konakovsky District is located at two banks of the Volga River which in the limits of the district is built as the Ivankovo Reservoir. It is elongated from the southwest to northeast, along the Volga, and the total area of the district belongs to its drainage basin. The main tributaries of the Volga within the district are the Soz River (left) and the Shosha River (right). The lower course of the Shosha makes a significant part of the Ivankovo Reservoir. The main tributary of the Shosha within the district is the Lama River (right).

== History ==
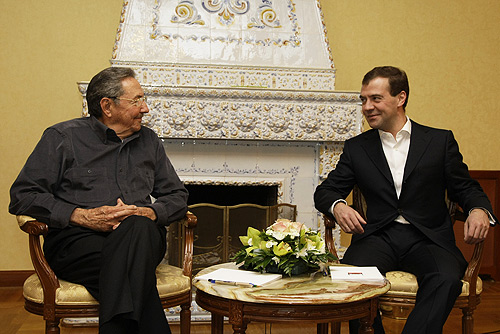
Dmitry Medvedev and Raúl Castro in Zavidovo.

Since the 13th century, the area was a part of Principality of Tver. In the 18th century, the eastern part of the district was included into Moscow Governorate. In 1775 it was transferred to newly established Tver Viceroyalty and since 1781 became a part of Korchevskoy Uyezd. In 1796, the Viceroyalty was abolished and transformed into Tver Governorate. The uyezd center was located in the town of Korcheva, located in the current area of the district. On May 30, 1922 Korchevskoy Uyezd was abolished and merged into Kimrsky Uyezd.

The western part of the district belonged to Klinsky Uyezd of Moscow Governorate.

On July 12 1929, Moscow and Tver Governorates was abolished, and the area was transferred to Moscow Oblast. Uyezds were abolished as well, and Kuznetsovsky District, with the administrative center in the town of Korcheva, was established within Kimry Okrug of Moscow Oblast. On July 23, 1930, the okrugs were abolished, and the districts were directly subordinated to the oblast. On February 26, 1930 the urban-type settlement of Kuznetsovo was renamed Konakovo, and Kuznetsovsky District was renamed Konakovsky. On January 29, 1935 Kalinin Oblast was established, and Konakovsky District was transferred to Kalinin Oblast. In 1937, when the Ivankovo Reservoir was filled, Korcheva was submerged into water. The administrative center of the district was transferred to Konakovo, which was granted town status. In 1941, during World War II, the western part of the district was occupied by German troops. On February 13, 1963, during the abortive Khrushchyov administrative reform, Konakovsky District was merged into Kalininsky District, but on January 12, 1965 it was re-established. In 1990, Kalinin Oblast was renamed Tver Oblast.

On July 12, 1929 Zavidovsky District with the administrative center in the urban-type settlement of Novozavidovsky was created as well. It was a part of Tver Okrug of Moscow Oblast. On July 1, 1936 it was transferred to Kalinin Oblast. On November 14, 1960 the district was abolished and merged into Konakovsky District.

On September 8, 1937 Orshinsky District with the administrative center in the selo of Rozhdestveno was established in the area which previously belonged to Konakovsky and Zavidovsky Districts. On October 22, 1959 the district was abolished and split between Konakovsky, Kalininsky, and Goritsky Districts.

In Zavidovo, a hunting ground was established in the 1960s for use by VIPs, including the heads of state. Since 1996, Zavidovo has a status of one of the official residences of the President of Russia.

== Economy ==
Konakovo Power Station, a thermal power plant, is the biggest enterprise in the district. In 2008, it produced over 60% of the GDP of the district.

=== Industry ===
The district is industrialized and is the third in Tver Oblast in terms of the industrial production, behind the city of Tver and Udomelsky District. Some of the big enterprises include a mechanical plant producing cranes and specialized trucks in the urban-type settlement of Novozavidovsky and a construction industry plant in the urban-type settlement of Izoplit.

=== Agriculture ===
The main specializations of agriculture in the district are cattle breeding with meat and milk production, poultry production, vegetables growing, fur production, fish farming, and fishery.

=== Transportation ===
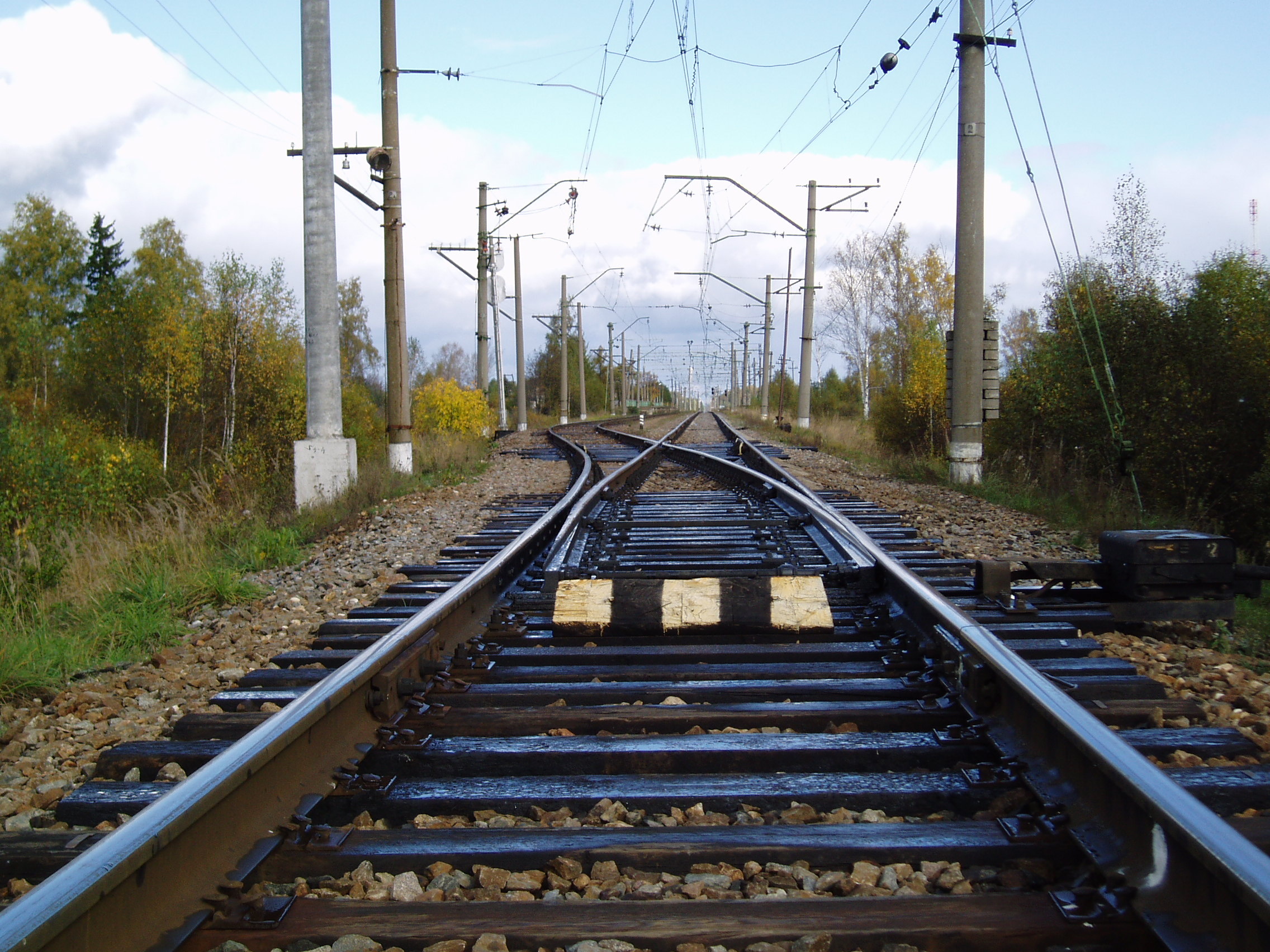
Konakovsky Mokh railway station.

The Moscow – Saint Petersburg Railway crosses the district from south to north. In particular, it crosses the Ivankovo Reservoir over a dam. The main stations within the district are Zavidovo (in the urban-type settlement of Novozavidovsky) and Redkino. All railway stops on this line within the district are on the Leningradsky suburban railway line and are connected by regular passenger suburban service with both Moscow (Moscow Leningradsky railway station) and Tver. Additionally, in Reshetnikovo a railway line to Konakovo branches off. Konakovo (Konakovo GRES) is connected by regular passenger suburban service with Moscow as well.

The M10 highway, which connects Moscow and St. Petersburg, crosses the district from southeast to northwest. In Zavidovo, a road branches off east, and proceeds to Konakovo and Kimry. There are also local roads with bus traffic.

== Culture and recreation ==
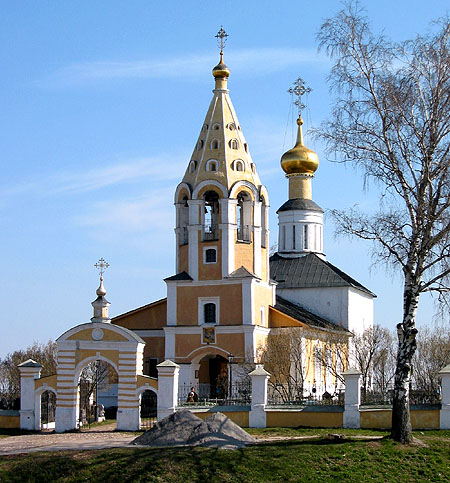
The Church of the Nativity of the Theotokos in Gorodnya (around 1340) is the oldest building in Tver Oblast.

The district contains four cultural heritage monuments of federal significance and additionally eighty-one objects classified as cultural and historical heritage of local significance (eight of them located in Konakovo). The federal monuments are the ensemble of the travel palace and the Church of the Nativity of the Theotokos in the selo of Gorodnya, the Poroshin House in the selo of Zavidovo, as well as a monument commemorating the Kalinin Front active during World War II.

Konakovo District Museum, located in Konakovo, has exhibitions on the archeology and history of the district. The Memorial Museum of Spiridon Drozhzhin is open in the urban-type settlement of Novozavidovsky. The house where Drozhzhin, a poet who lived in the 19th and the beginning of the 20th centuries, built this house in the village of Nizovka, which was later submerged by water at the construction of the Ivankovo Reservoir. The house was transferred to Novozavidovsky and opened as a museum. It was considerably damaged during World War II and restored later. It currently exhibits personal belongings of Drozhzhin and shows an exposition on his life.
