= Reshetnikovo =

Reshetnikovo (Russian: Решетниково) is the name of several inhabited localities in Russia.

== Modern localities ==
Urban localities

- Reshetnikovo, Moscow Oblast, a work settlement in Klinsky District of Moscow Oblast; 56°27′N 36°34′E

Rural localities

- Reshetnikovo, Chuvash Republic, a village in Attikovskoye Rural Settlement of Kozlovsky District in the Chuvash Republic
- Reshetnikovo, Kirov Oblast, a village in Rodyginsky Rural Okrug of Sovetsky District in Kirov Oblast; 57°38′N 48°51′E
- Reshetnikovo, Leningrad Oblast, a village in Pervomayskoye Settlement Municipal Formation of Vyborgsky District in Leningrad Oblast; 60°14′N 29°43′E
- Reshetnikovo, Omsk Oblast, a village in Takmyksky Rural Okrug of Bolsherechensky District in Omsk Oblast; 56°18′N 74°42′E
- Reshetnikovo, Bezhanitsky District, Pskov Oblast, a village in Bezhanitsky District of Pskov Oblast
- Reshetnikovo, Opochetsky District, Pskov Oblast, a village in Opochetsky District of Pskov Oblast
- Reshetnikovo, Velikoluksky District, Pskov Oblast, a village in Velikoluksky District of Pskov Oblast
- Reshetnikovo, Gagarinsky District, Smolensk Oblast, a village in Yelninskoye Rural Settlement of Gagarinsky District in Smolensk Oblast
- Reshetnikovo, Novoduginsky District, Smolensk Oblast, a village in Kapustinskoye Rural Settlement of Novoduginsky District in Smolensk Oblast
- Reshetnikovo, Udmurt Republic, a village in Nyneksky Selsoviet of Mozhginsky District in the Udmurt Republic
- Reshetnikovo, Kichmengsko-Gorodetsky District, Vologda Oblast, a village in Kichmengsky Selsoviet of Kichmengsko-Gorodetsky District in Vologda Oblast
- Reshetnikovo, Sokolsky District, Vologda Oblast, a village in Nesterovsky Selsoviet of Sokolsky District in Vologda Oblast
- Reshetnikovo, Vologodsky District, Vologda Oblast, a village in Borisovsky Selsoviet of Vologodsky District in Vologda Oblast

== Alternative names ==
- Reshetnikovo, alternative name of Reshotkino, a village under the administrative jurisdiction of the Town of Klin in Klinsky District of Moscow Oblast; 56°17′N 36°40′E
