= Kozlovo, Konakovsky District, Tver Oblast =

Kozlovo Козлово
- Work settlement
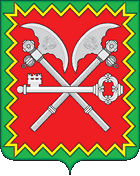
- Coat of arms
- Interactive map of Kozlovo
- Location of Kozlovo Kozlovo (Tver Oblast)
- Coordinates: 56°30′35″N 36°16′13″E
- Country: Russia
- Federal subject: Tver Oblast
- Administrative district: Konakovsky District

Population (2010 Census)
  - Total: 3,884
  - Estimate (2021): 3,022 (−22.2%)

Municipal status
  - Municipal district: Konakovsky Municipal District
  - Urban settlement: Urban Settlement Kozlovo
  - Capital of: Urban Settlement Kozlovo
- Time zone: UTC+3 (MSK)
- Postal code: 171274
- OKTMO ID: 28630158051
- Website: admkozlovo.ru

Kozlovo (Russian: Козлово) is an urban locality (an urban-type settlement) in Konakovsky District of Tver Oblast, Russia, located close the right bank of the Shosha River (the Ivankovo Reservoir). Population: 3,884 (2010 census); 4,388 (2002 census); 4,368 (1989 Soviet census).

== History ==
The village of Kozlovo was first mentioned in the 16th century. After 1781, it belonged to Klinsky Uyezd of Moscow Governorate. In 1857, a carpet factory was open by merchant Flanden. The factory served for a long time as the main employer in Kozlovo.

On July 12 1929, Moscow Governorate was abolished, and the area was transferred to Moscow Oblast. Uyezds were abolished as well, and Zavidovsky District, with the administrative center in Novozavidovsky, was established within Tver Okrug of Moscow Oblast. Kozlovo was included into Zavidovsky District. On July 23, 1930, the okrugs were abolished, and the districts were directly subordinated to the oblast. On January 29, 1935 Kalinin Oblast was established, and Zavidovsky District was transferred to Kalinin Oblast. In November and December 1941, during World War II, Kozlovo was occupied by German troops. In 1958, Kozlovo was granted urban-type settlement status. On November 14, 1960 the district was abolished and merged into Konakovsky District. On February 13, 1963, during the abortive Khrushchyov administrative reform, Konakovsky District was merged into Kalininsky District, but on January 12, 1965 it was re-established. In 1990, Kalinin Oblast was renamed Tver Oblast.

== Economy ==
Kozlovo is one of the gateways to Zavidovo National Park, and the Rus' State Residence, a closed area guarded by the Federal Security Service which is only accessible to high-level state employees. The headquarters of the nature reserve are located in Kozlovo, and it is by far the main employer.

=== Industry ===
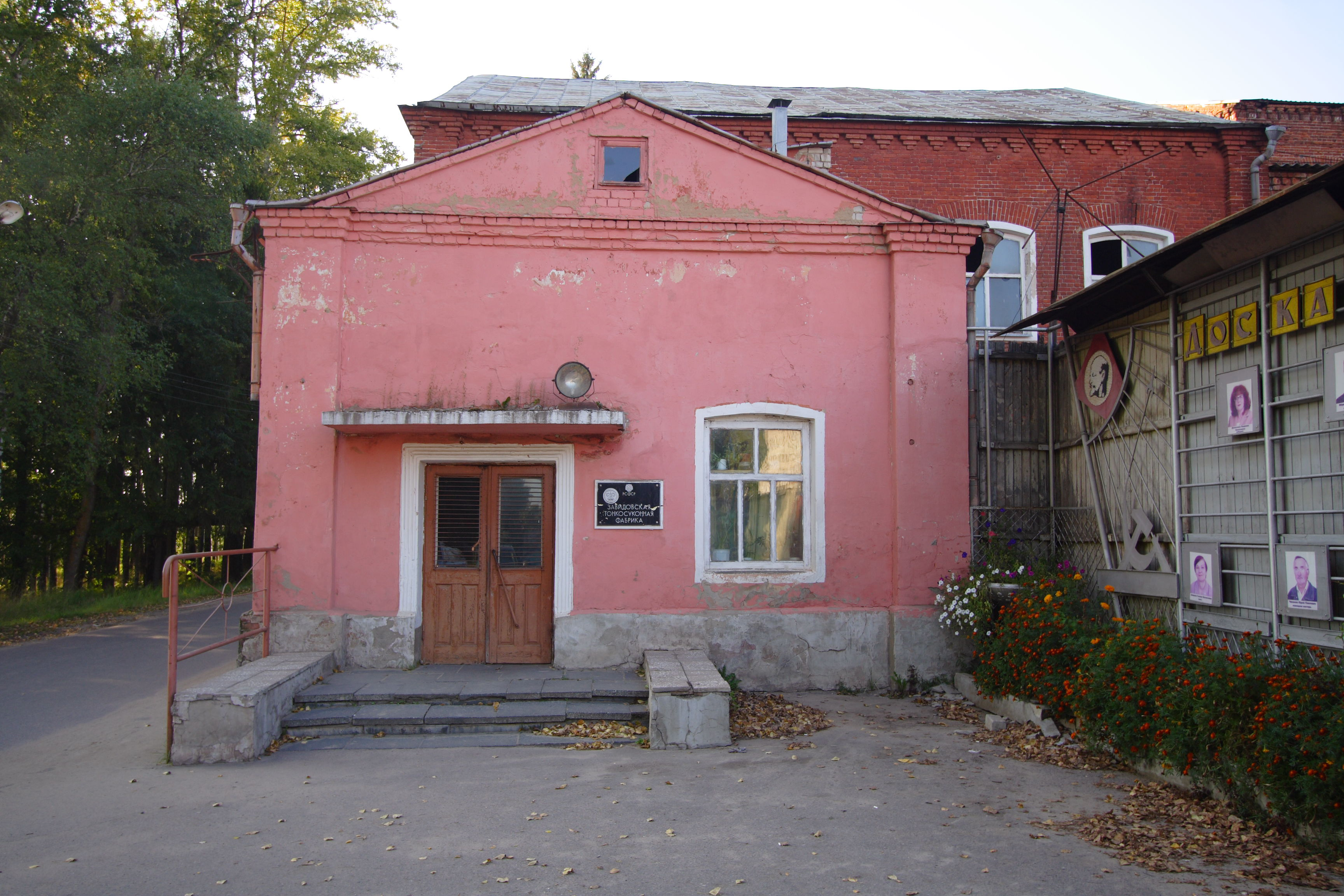
Zavidovsky Textil Factory

There are two textile factories in the settlement.

=== Transportation ===
The closest railway station is Zavidovo in the settlement of Novozavidovsky, at the Moscow – Saint Petersburg Railway. It belongs to the Leningradsky suburban railway linew and is connected by regular passenger suburban service with both Moscow (Moscow Leningradsky railway station) and Tver.

Kozlovo has a road access via Novozavidovsky to the M10 highway, which connects Moscow and St. Petersburg. In the opposite direction, it is connected to Tver via Turginovo.

== Culture and recreation ==
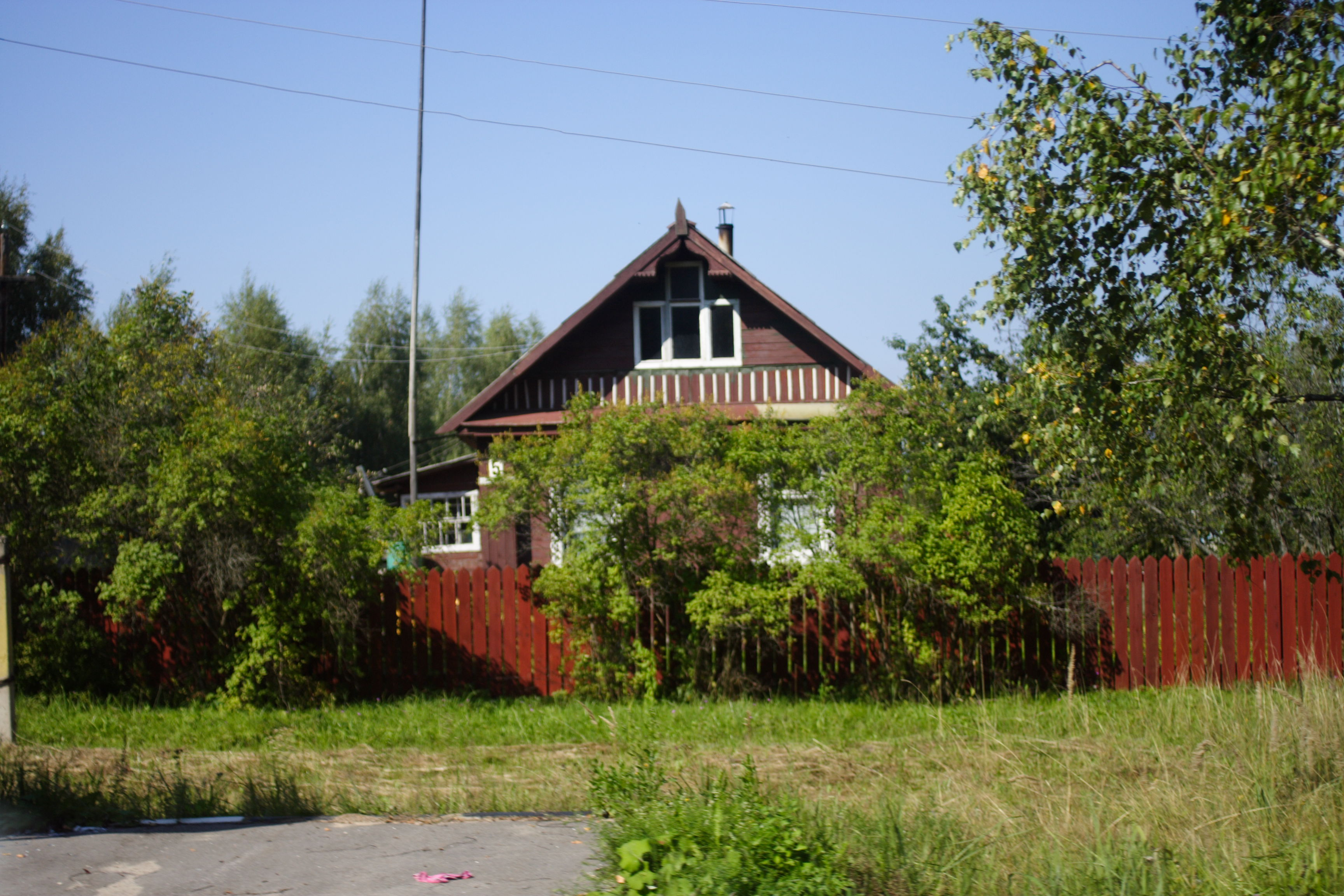
A private house in Kozlovo

Kozlovo contains two cultural heritage monuments of local significance. They are the Church of the Nativity of John the Baptist, constructed in 1880, and a monument to the soldiers fallen in World War II.
