= Redkino, Konakovsky District, Tver Oblast =

Redkino Редкино
- Work settlement
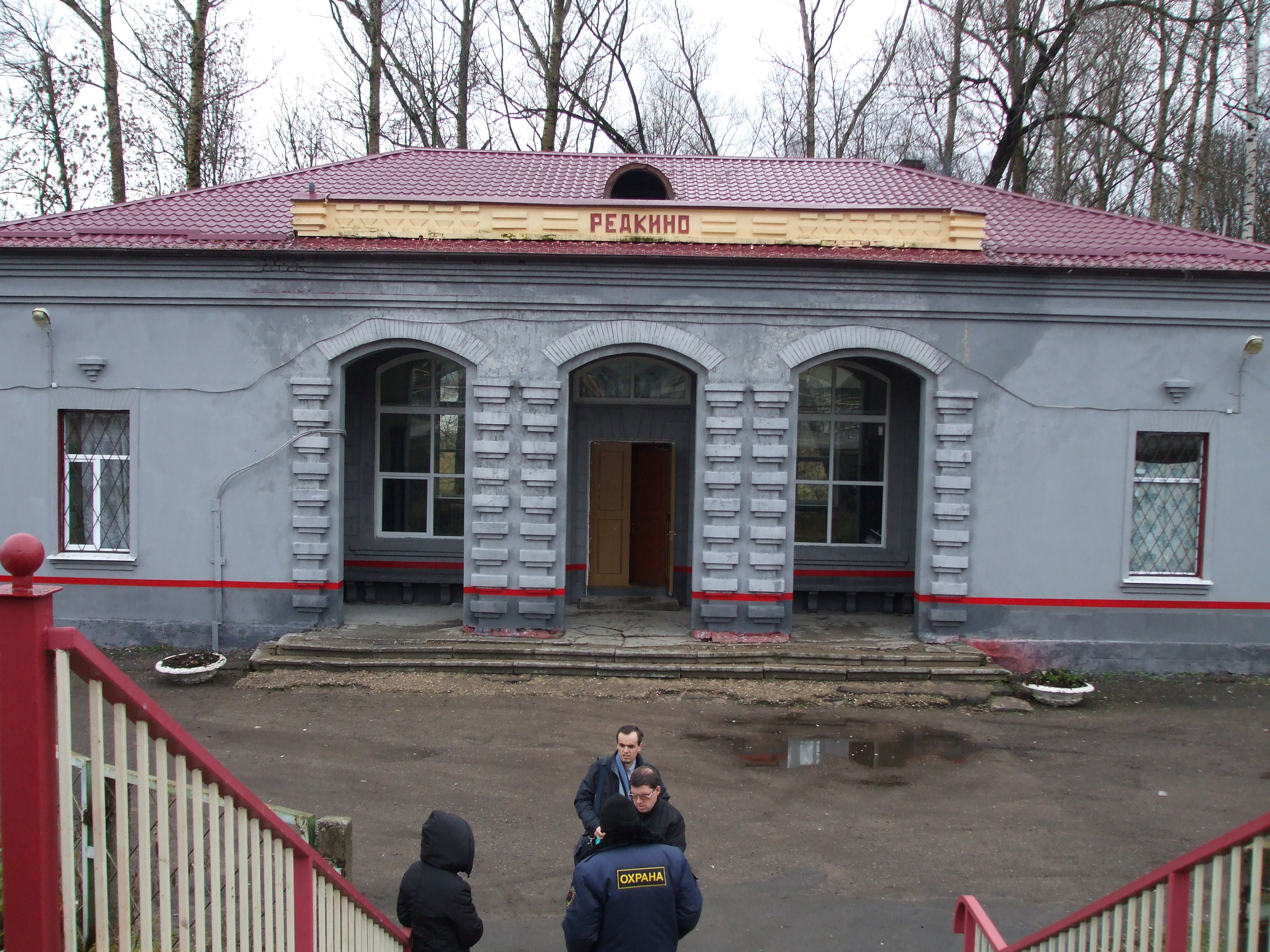
- On the station

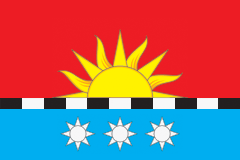
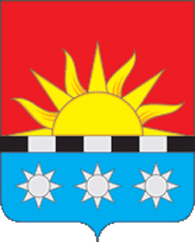
- Flag Coat of arms
- Interactive map of Redkino
- Location of Redkino Redkino (Tver Oblast)
- Coordinates: 56°38′36″N 36°17′46″E
- Country: Russia
- Federal subject: Tver Oblast
- Administrative district: Konakovsky District

Population (2010 Census)
  - Total: 11,703
  - Estimate (2021): 9,634 (−17.7%)

Municipal status
  - Municipal district: Konakovsky Municipal District
  - Urban settlement: Urban Settlement Redkino
  - Capital of: Urban Settlement Redkino
- Time zone: UTC+3 (MSK)
- Postal codes: 171260, 171261
- Dialing code: +7 48242
- OKTMO ID: 28630174051
- Website: admin-redkino.ru

Redkino (Russian: Ре́дкино) is an urban locality (an urban-type settlement) in Konakovsky District of Tver Oblast, Russia, located about 130 kilometers (81 mi) northwest of Moscow. Population: 11,703 (2010 census); 11,887 (2002 census); 13,448 (1989 Soviet census).

== History ==
Redkino was known as a village since at least 16th century. In 1851, a railway station was open. In the second half of the 19th century, the peat extraction started, but the peat production factory which was built in Redkino in 1902 burned to the ground in 1907, and it only was rebuilt in 1918. Also in the second half of the 19th century, a textile factory and a ski factory were built. In 1937, when the nearby Ivankovo Reservoir was filling up, many inhabitants were resettled from the villages to be submerged under water into Redkino. In 1939, Redkino was granted urban-type settlement status. During World War II, Redkino was occupied by German troops for a month in November–December 1941.

Until 1929, Redkino was a part of Klinsky Uyezd of Moscow Governorate. On July 12 1929, the Governorate was abolished, and Redkino was transferred to Moscow Oblast. Uyezds were abolished as well, and Zavidovsky District, with the administrative center in the urban-type settlement of Novozavidovsky, was established within Tver Okrug of Moscow Oblast. Redkino was a part of Zavidovsky District. On July 23, 1930, the okrugs were abolished, and the districts were directly subordinated to the oblast. On January 29, 1935 Kalinin Oblast was established, and Zavidovsky District was transferred to Kalinin Oblast. On November 14, 1960 the district was abolished and merged into Konakovsky District. On February 13, 1963, during the abortive Khrushchyov administrative reform, Konakovsky District was merged into Kalininsky District, but on January 12, 1965 it was re-established. In 1990, Kalinin Oblast was renamed Tver Oblast.

== Economy ==
=== Industry ===
The settlement is notable as the location of a large chemical experimental plant. New chemical processes are tested first on small scale installations before being transferred to large plants. There is production of oxygen (by air compression method), hydrogen (by water electrolysis), mercaptan, etc. One installation is a production of aviation gasoline from peat moss. This is an attempt to duplicate German experiments at the end of World War II. The plant has large assortment of reactor equipment from Japan being high pressure reactors for various chemical processes.

=== Transportation ===
The railway station of Redkino at the Moscow – Saint Petersburg Railway is located in Redkino. It belongs to the Leningradsky suburban railway line and is connected by regular passenger suburban service with both Moscow (Moscow Leningradsky railway station) and Tver. The speed of fast trains (which do not stop at the station) are higher in Redkino than anywhere else in Russia; the rails are of heaviest type (R70).

Novozavidovsky has a road access to the M10 highway, which connects Moscow and St. Petersburg.

== Culture and recreation ==
Redkino contains two cultural heritage monuments of local significance. They are monuments commemorating soldiers fallen in World War II.
