= Domkino =

Domkino (Russian: Домкино) is the name of several rural localities in Russia:

- Domkino, Leningrad Oblast, a village in Skreblovskoye Settlement Municipal Formation of Luzhsky District in Leningrad Oblast; 58°36′N 29°51′E
- Domkino, Pskov Oblast, a village in Strugo-Krasnensky District of Pskov Oblast
