= Spiridon Drozhzhin =

Russian/Soviet poet (1848–1930)

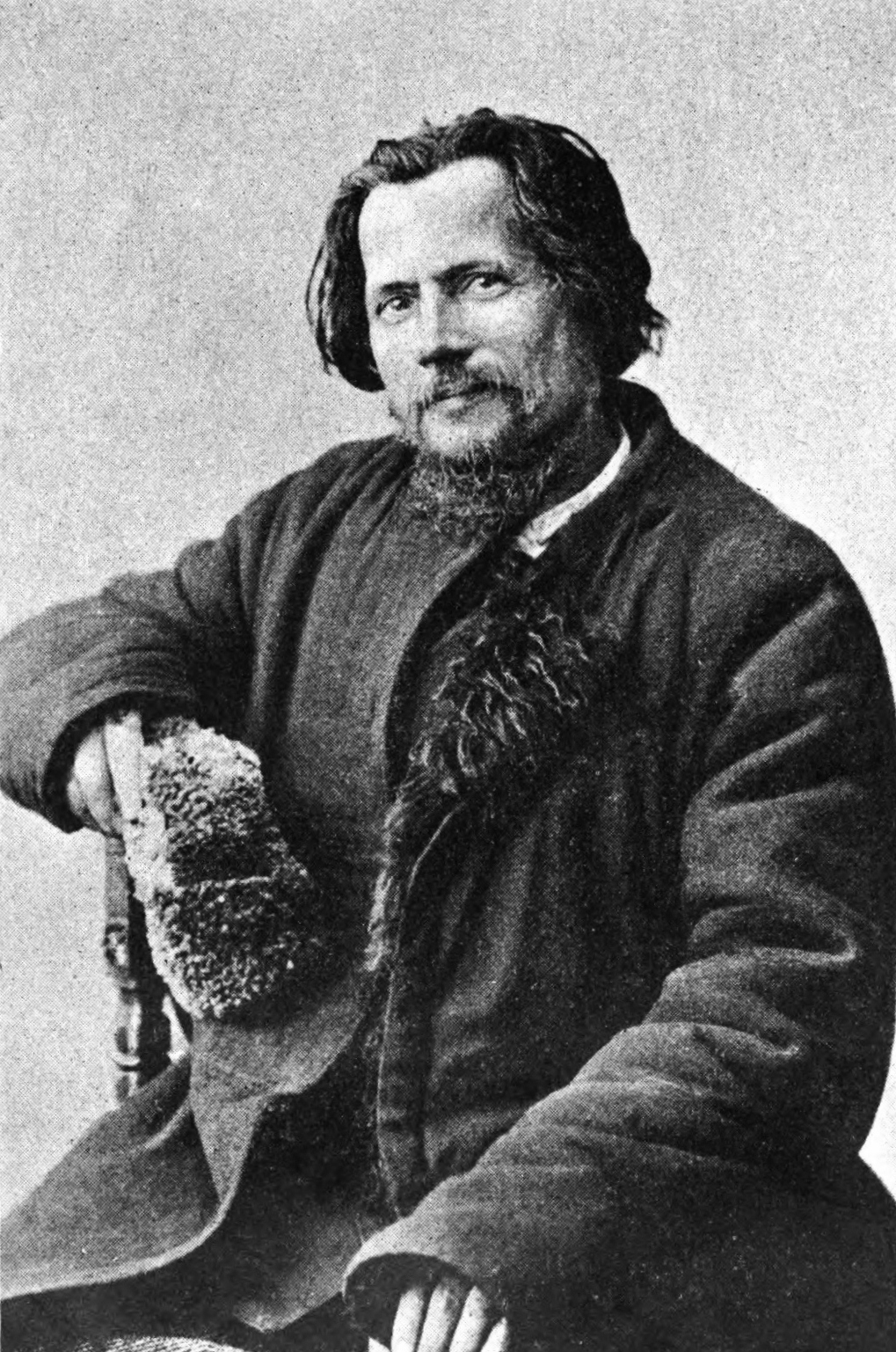
- Born: 18 December [O.S. 6 December] 1848; Nizovka, Tverskoy Uyezd, Tver Governorate, Russian Empire
- Died: 24 December 1930 (aged 82); Nizovka, Konakovsky District, Moscow Oblast, Soviet Union

Signature
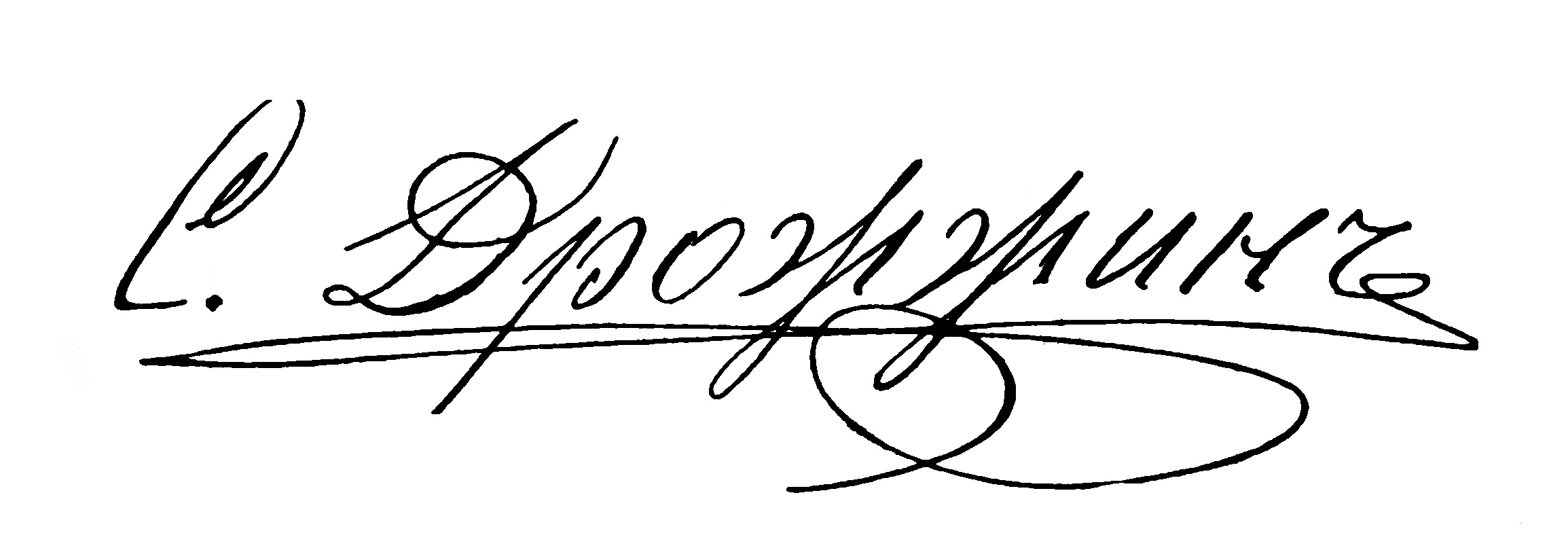

Spiridon Dmitriyevich Drozhzhin (Russian: Спиридо́н Дми́триевич Дро́жжин, IPA: [sʲpʲɪrʲɪˈdon ˈdmʲitrʲɪjɪvʲɪdʑ ˈdroʐːɨn, - ˈdroʑːɪn]; 18 December 1848 – 24 December 1930) was a Russian poet.

== Biography ==
Drozhzhin was born in the village of Nizovka, part of what is now Tver Oblast. He only spent two winters at school, and then the 11-year-old boy was sent to St. Petersburg to work. He spent the following years wandering around Russia, and mastered many crafts. During his stay in St. Petersburg (1860–1871), he worked on his self-education and got to know works by, among others, Nikolay Nekrasov, Aleksey Koltsov, Ivan Nikitin, and Leo Tolstoy. At the age of 16, he wrote his first poem and in 1867, started his diary which he kept for the rest of his life. His poems were first published in 1873 in a magazine called Gramotey (The Educated One). This publication was followed by others. Due to his poor state of financial affairs, and the influence of Count Leo Tolstoy, whom he met in 1892 and 1897, he had returned home to Tver region in 1896 and devoted himself to writing.

The son of a serf, he earned renown as a talented self-educated poet. He welcomed the October Revolution, which he saw as the realization of the people's hopes and aspirations. This is expressed in his poems Opening Song (1920), At the Village Assembly (1920), and In Memory of V. I. Lenin (1924). Drozhzhin's poetry was influenced by Aleksey Koltsov and Nikolay Nekrasov. Some of his verses have been set to music and have become part of Russian folklore. In 1938, a museum devoted to Drozhzhin was opened in the settlement of Novozavidovski in Tver Oblast.

The Russian Academy of Sciences awarded him with two medals for his poetry. Several of Drozhzhin's poems were translated into German by the poet Rainer Maria Rilke.
