= Novozavidovsky =

Novozavidovsky Новозавидовский
- Work settlement
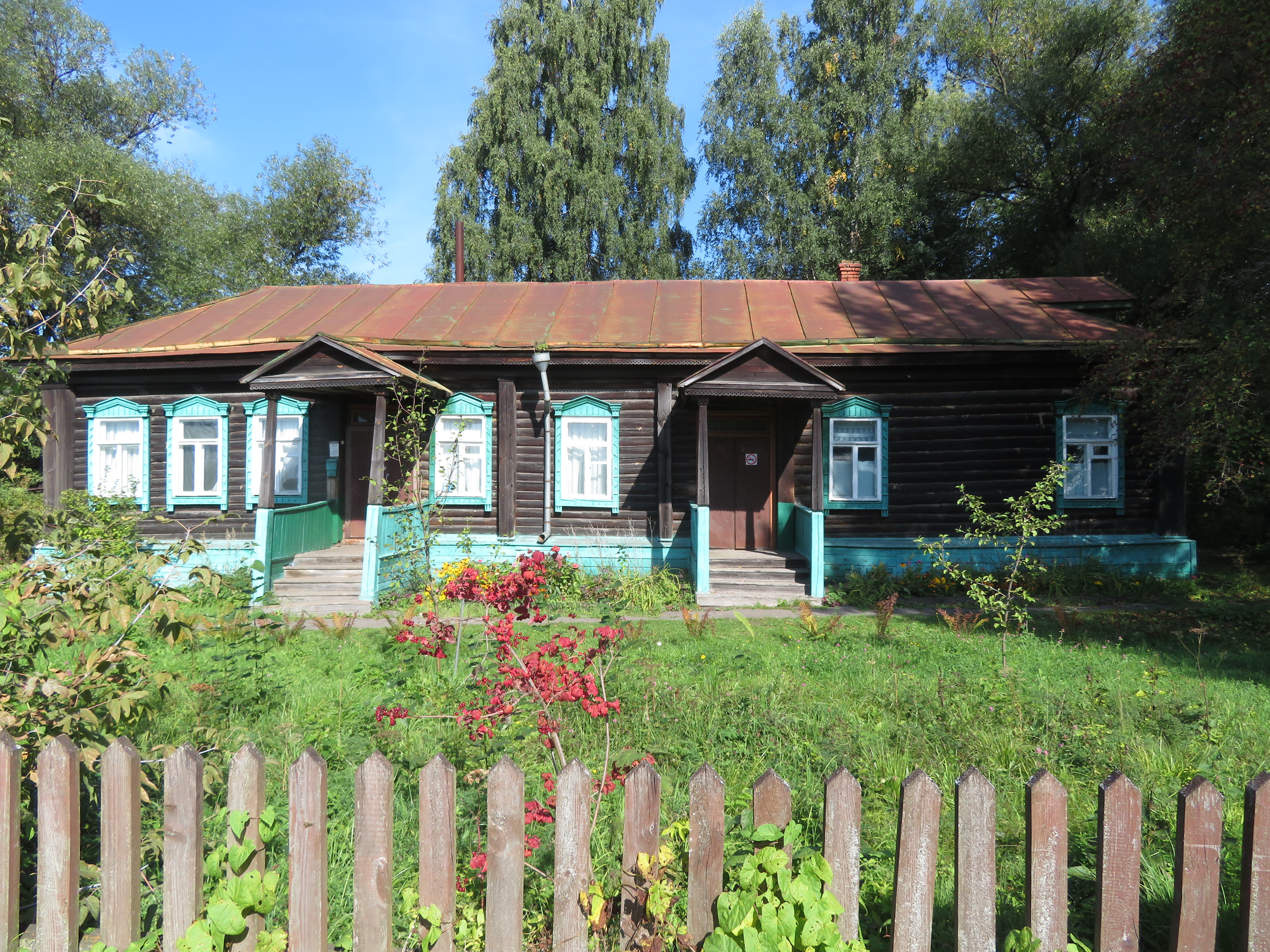
- House museum of the poet Spiridon Drozhzhin
- Interactive map of Novozavidovsky
- Location of Novozavidovsky Novozavidovsky (Tver Oblast)
- Coordinates: 56°33′16″N 36°25′58″E
- Country: Russia
- Federal subject: Tver Oblast
- Administrative district: Konakovsky District

Population (2010 Census)
  - Total: 7,479
  - Estimate (2021): 5,723 (−23.5%)

Municipal status
  - Municipal district: Konakovsky Municipal District
  - Urban settlement: Urban Settlement Novozavidovsky
  - Capital of: Urban Settlement Novozavidovsky
- Time zone: UTC+3 (MSK)
- Postal code: 171272
- OKTMO ID: 28630163051
- Website: novozavidovo-adm.ru

Novozavidovsky (Russian: Новозави́довский) is an urban locality (an urban-type settlement) in Konakovsky District of Tver Oblast, Russia, located on the right bank of the Shosha River (the Ivankovo Reservoir). Population: 7,479 (2010 census); 7,893 (2002 census); 8,950 (1989 Soviet census).

== History ==
In 1851, a railway station was open, and in 1866, the textile (wool) factory was constructed close to the station by merchant Varentsov. Novozavidovsky originated as the settlement around the station and the factory. In 1913, the name of the settlement was Alexandrovka; it is not exactly clear when the name Novozavidovsky began to be used. The name of the station originates from Zavidovo, a nearby village and currently a residence of the President of Russia, and the name of the settlement was transferred from the name of the station. In 1926, Novozavidovsky was granted urban-type settlement status.

Until 1922, Novozavidovsky was a part of Klinsky Uyezd of Moscow Governorate. On July 12 1929, the Governorate was abolished, and the area was transferred to Moscow Oblast. Uyezds were abolished as well, and Zavidovsky District, with the administrative center in Novozavidovsky, was established within Tver Okrug of Moscow Oblast. On July 23, 1930, the okrugs were abolished, and the districts were directly subordinated to the oblast. On January 29, 1935 Kalinin Oblast was established, and Zavidovsky District was transferred to Kalinin Oblast. On November 14, 1960 the district was abolished and merged into Konakovsky District. On February 13, 1963, during the abortive Khrushchyov administrative reform, Konakovsky District was merged into Kalininsky District, but on January 12, 1965 it was re-established. In 1990, Kalinin Oblast was renamed Tver Oblast.

== Economy ==
=== Industry ===
In Novozavidovsky, there is a mechanical plant producing cranes and specialized trucks. There is also a textile factory, mainly producing hats.

=== Transportation ===
The railway station of Zavidovo at the Moscow – Saint Petersburg Railway is located in Novozavidovsky. It belongs to the Leningradsky suburban railway line and is connected by regular passenger suburban service with both Moscow (Moscow Leningradsky railway station) and Tver.

Novozavidovsky has a road access to the M10 highway, which connects Moscow and St. Petersburg. In the opposite direction, it is connected to Tver via Kozlovo and Turginovo.

== Culture and recreation ==
The Memorial Museum of Spiridon Drozhzhin is open in Novozavidovsky. The house where Spiridon Drozhzhin, a poet who lived in the 19th and the beginning of the 20th centuries, built this house in the village of Nizovka, which was later submerged by water at the construction of the Ivankovo Reservoir. The house was transferred to Novozavidovsky and open as a museum. It was considerably damaged during World War II and restored later. It currently exhibits personal belongings of Drozhzhin and shows an exposition on his life.

Novozavidovsky contains four cultural heritage monuments of local significance. They are the house and the tomb of Spiridon Drozhzhin, as well as two monuments to the soldiers fallen in World War II.
