= Moskovsky City District, Tver =

Moskovsky City District (Russian: Моско́вский райо́н) is a district of the city of Tver, Tver Oblast, Russia. Population: 120,192 (2010 Census); 124,538 (2002 Census); 132,003 (1989 Soviet census).

In 1975, Proletarsky City District and parts of Novopromyshlenny City District of Tver were merged to form Tsentralny City District, and the remaining part of Novopromyshlenny City District was renamed Moskovsky. The name was given because the road to Moscow starts on the city district's territory.
