= Domkino, Leningrad Oblast =

Domkino Домкино
- Village
- Location within Leningrad Oblast Location within Russia
- Coordinates: 58°36′N 29°51′E
- Country: Russia
- Region: Leningrad Oblast
- District: Luzhsky District

Population (2017)
  - Total: 107
- Time zone: UTC+3:00

Domkino (Russian: Домкино) is a rural locality (a village) in Skreblovskoye Settlement Municipal Formation of Luzhsky District, Leningrad Oblast, Russia. The population was 107 as of 2017.
