= Domkino, Pskov Oblast =

Domkino Домкино
- Village
- Location within Pskov Oblast Location within Russia
- Coordinates: 58°24′N 28°32′E
- Country: Russia
- Region: Pskov Oblast
- District: Strugo-Krasnensky District
- Time zone: UTC+3:00

Domkino (Russian: Домкино) is a rural locality (a village) in Strugo-Krasnensky District, Pskov Oblast, Russia. The population was 20 as of 2001.
