= Korcheva =

Former town in Tver Oblast, Russia

Korcheva Корчева
- Town
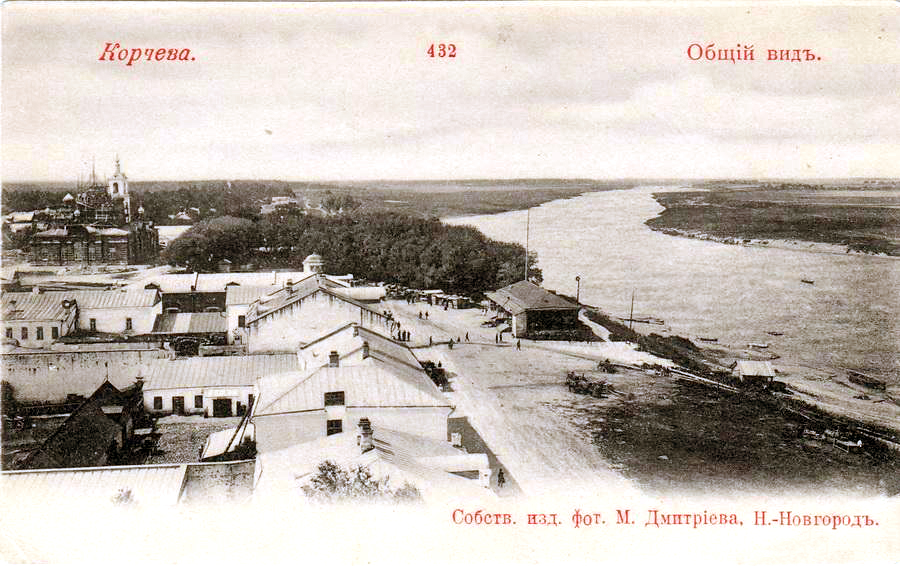
- Korcheva in the early 20th century

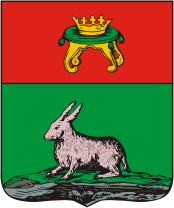
- Coat of arms

- Location within Tver Oblast Location within Russia
- Coordinates: 56°47′20″N 36°50′24″E
- Country: Russia
- Region: Tver Oblast
- District: Konakovsky
- Town status since: 1781
- Abandoned: 1937

Historical population
Year	Pop.
1863	3,317
1897	2,182
1913	2,518
1923	2,353

Korcheva (Russian: Корчева́) was a town in central Russia, on the territory of the modern Konakovsky District, Tver Oblast, on the Volga River, with a population of a few thousand people. It was first mentioned in the 1540s as a selo. Korcheva received town status in 1781 by the order of the empress Catherine II. Korcheva was the administrative center of Korchevskoy Uyezd, one of the uyezds of Tver Viceroyalty and subsequently, from 1803, of Tver Governorate. The town was prosperous until it was bypassed by the railroads in the latter half of the nineteenth century.

As the Ivankovo Reservoir and the Moscow Canal were constructed during the stalinist development of the Soviet Union, the town was abandoned and destroyed in 1936, and mostly submerged under the waters of the reservoir the next year. Most of the population was resettled into the nearby town of Konakovo. One can still find the only surviving house (which belonged to merchant Rozhdestvensky), a cemetery, and a foundation of the ruined Kazanskaya church at an impracticable bank of the reservoir.

== Cultural references ==
- Mikhail Saltykov-Shchedrin refers to Korcheva a number of times in his novels, particularly in Modern Idyll (1883), in which his travelers stop there in a voyage on the Volga and are not impressed.
- Alexander Chayanov, in his story "Istoriya parikmakherskoi kukli" ("The Tale of the Hairdresser's Mannequin"), sets a chapter in Korcheva, where a panopticon has set up its tents "on the high bank of the Volga."

== Notable citizens ==
- Vladimir Minorsky (1877–1966), orientalist
- Vadim Lyovshin (1896–1969), physicist

== Gallery ==
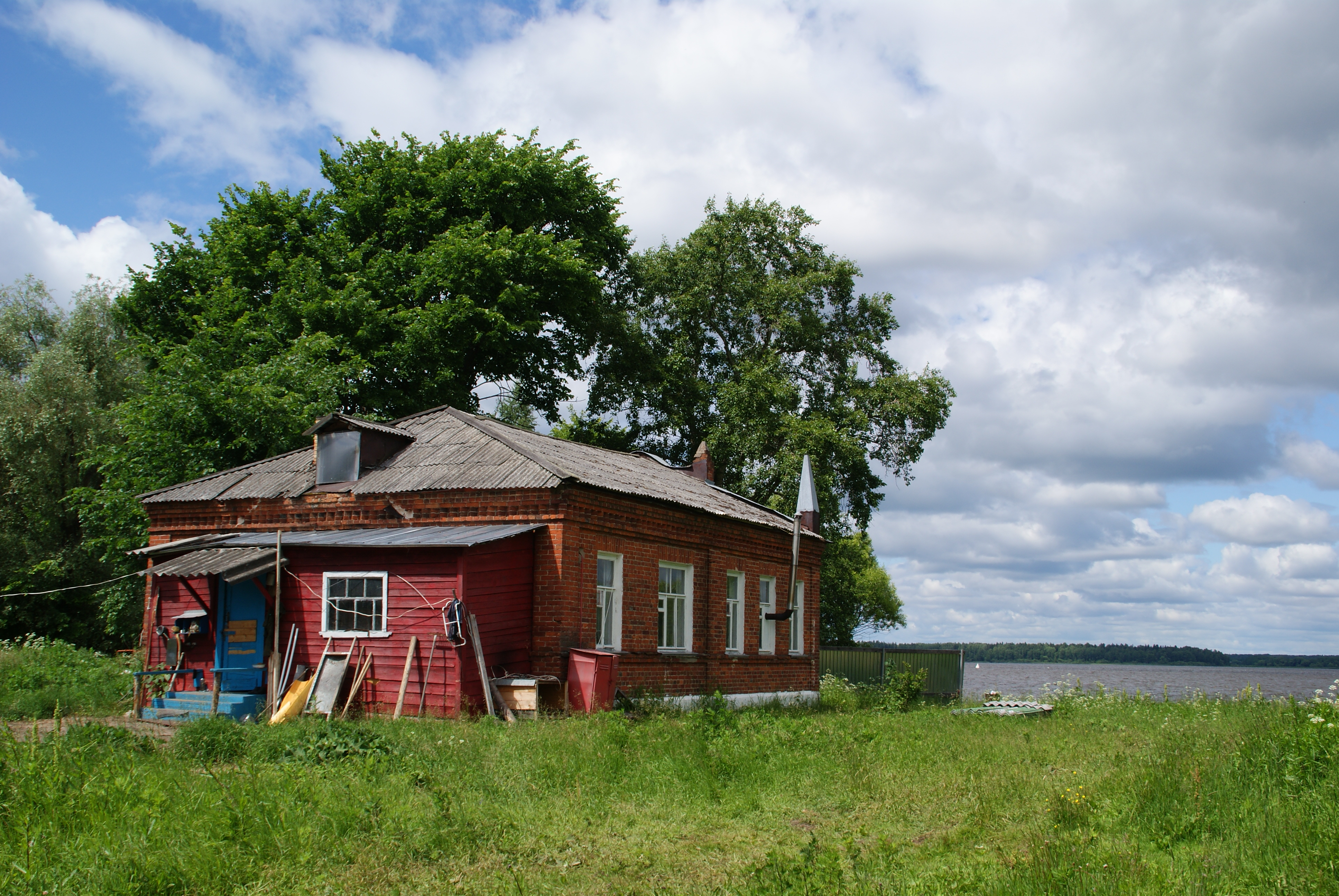
Rozhdestvensky house

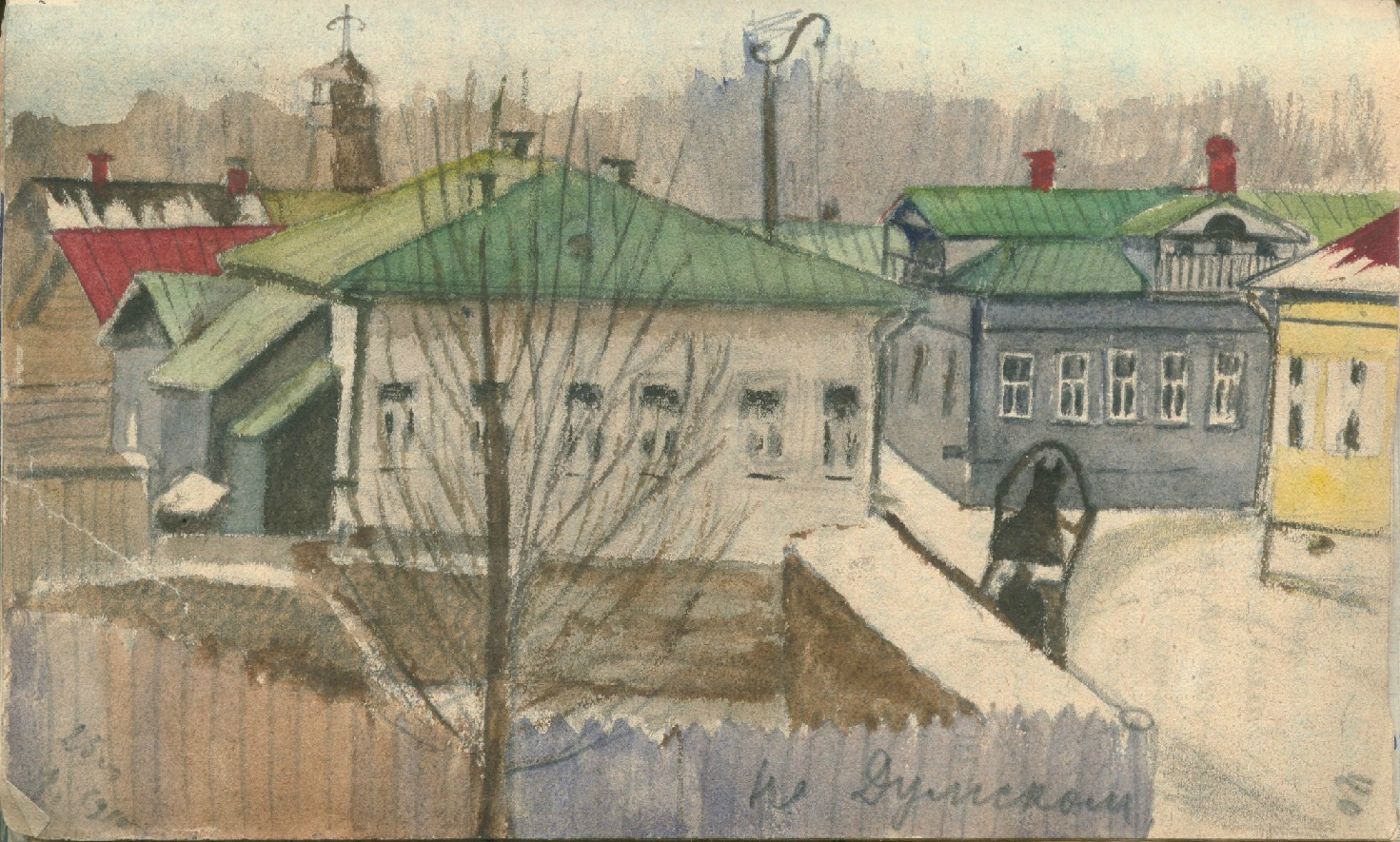
Dumsky Lane in Korcheva by nurse Anna Zhdanova, 1910

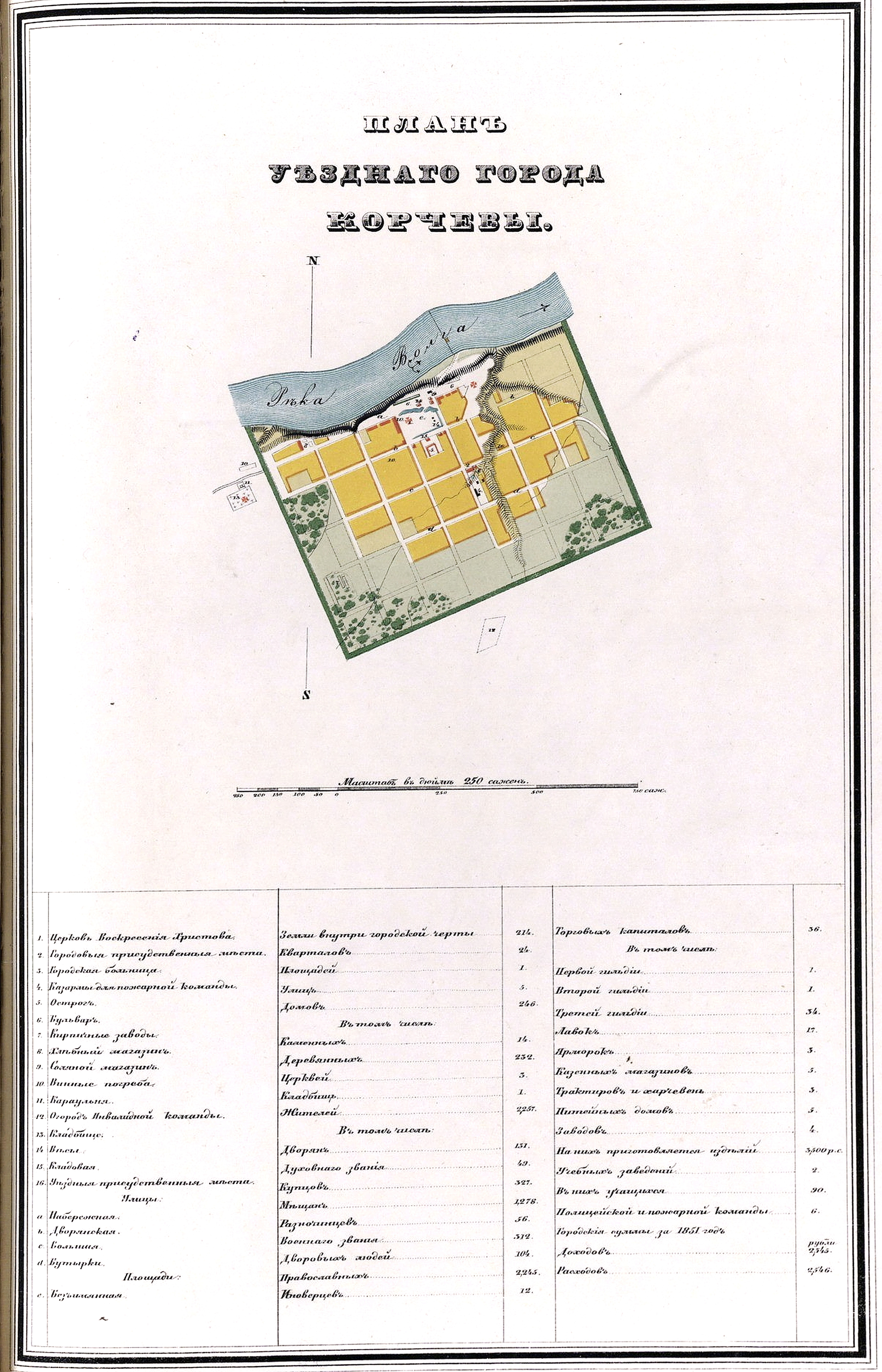
1855 plan of the town

== See also ==
- Mologa
- Flooded Belfry, Kalyazin
