= Izoplit =

Izoplit Изоплит
- Work settlement
- Interactive map of Izoplit
- Location of Izoplit Izoplit (Tver Oblast)
- Coordinates: 56°37′40″N 36°12′19″E
- Country: Russia
- Federal subject: Tver Oblast
- Administrative district: Konakovsky District

Population (2010 Census)
  - Total: 1,769
  - Estimate (2021): 1,197 (−32.3%)

Municipal status
  - Municipal district: Konakovsky Municipal District
  - Urban settlement: Urban Settlement Izoplit
  - Capital of: Urban Settlement Izoplit
- Time zone: UTC+3 (MSK)
- Postal code: 171277
- OKTMO ID: 28630155051
- Website: www.adm-izoplit.ru

Izoplit (Russian: Изопли́т) is an urban locality (an urban-type settlement) in Konakovsky District of Tver Oblast, Russia. It is located in a swampy area, adjacent to the nature reserve of Zavidovo. Population: 1,769 (2010 census); 4,441 (2002 census); 5,331 (1989 Soviet census).

== History ==
In 1930, the peat extraction in the area started, and the plant Izoplit started operation. The settlement was founded to host the plant workers. At the time, it was a part of Zavidovsky District of Moscow Oblast. On January 29, 1935 Kalinin Oblast was established, and Zavidovsky District was transferred to Kalinin Oblast. During World War II, Redkino was occupied by German troops for a month in November–December 1941. In 1946, it was granted urban-type settlement status. On November 14, 1960 the district was abolished and merged into Konakovsky District. On February 13, 1963, during the abortive Khrushchyov administrative reform, Konakovsky District was merged into Kalininsky District, but on January 12, 1965 it was re-established. In 1990, Kalinin Oblast was renamed Tver Oblast.

== Economy ==
=== Industry ===
The settlement was built to serve the eponymous plant which produced construction blocks with improved thermal isolation. By 2013 the plant, which employed virtually the whole population of Izoplit, went bankrupt, and in late 2013, it was sold to the Finnish company Paroc OY AB and reopened.

=== Transportation ===
The railway station of Redkino at the Moscow – Saint Petersburg Railway, located in the settlement of Redkino, is approximately 5 kilometres (3.1 mi) east of Izoplit. It belongs to the Leningradsky suburban railway line and is connected by regular passenger suburban service with both Moscow (Moscow Leningradsky railway station) and Tver. There is a railway branch between Redkino and Izoplit, but it is not used for passenger traffic. The settlement is connected by the outside world by one road which goes to Redkino and has access to the M10 highway connecting Moscow and Saint Petersburg.
