= Reshetnikovo, Moscow Oblast =

Reshetnikovo Решетниково
- Urban-type settlement
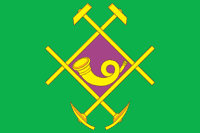
- Flag
- Interactive map of Reshetnikovo
- Location of Reshetnikovo Reshetnikovo (Moscow Oblast)
- Coordinates: 56.4492°N 36.5684°E
- Country: Russia
- Federal subject: Moscow Oblast
- Administrative district: Klinsky District

Population (2010 Census)
  - Total: 3,118
  - Estimate (2025): 4,625 (+48.3%)
- Time zone: UTC+3 (MSK)
- Postal codes: 141631, 141625
- OKTMO ID: 46621154051

Reshetnikovo (Russian: Решетниково) is an urban locality (an urban-type settlement) in Klinsky District of Moscow Oblast, Russia. Population: 3,118 (2010 census); 3,219 (2002 census); 4,151 (1989 Soviet census).
