= Tverskoy Uyezd =

Tverskoy Uyezd (Тверской уезд) was one of the subdivisions of the Tver Governorate of the Russian Empire. It was situated in the northeastern part of the governorate. Its administrative centre was Tver.

== Demographics ==
At the time of the Russian Empire Census of 1897, Tverskoy Uyezd had a population of 166,905. Of these, 97.9% spoke Russian, 0.5% Polish, 0.4% Yiddish, 0.4% Ukrainian, 0.2% German, 0.1% Karelian and 0.1% Tatar as their native language.
