= Korchevskoy Uyezd =

Former subdivision of Tver, Russian Empire

Korchevskoy Uyezd (Корчевской уезд) was one of the subdivisions of the Tver Governorate of the Russian Empire. It was situated in the eastern part of the governorate. Its administrative centre was Korcheva.

== Demographics ==
At the time of the Russian Empire Census of 1897, Korchevskoy Uyezd had a population of 119,009. Of these, 99.8% spoke Russian as their native language.
