= Klinsky District =

Klinsky District Клинский район (Russian)
- District
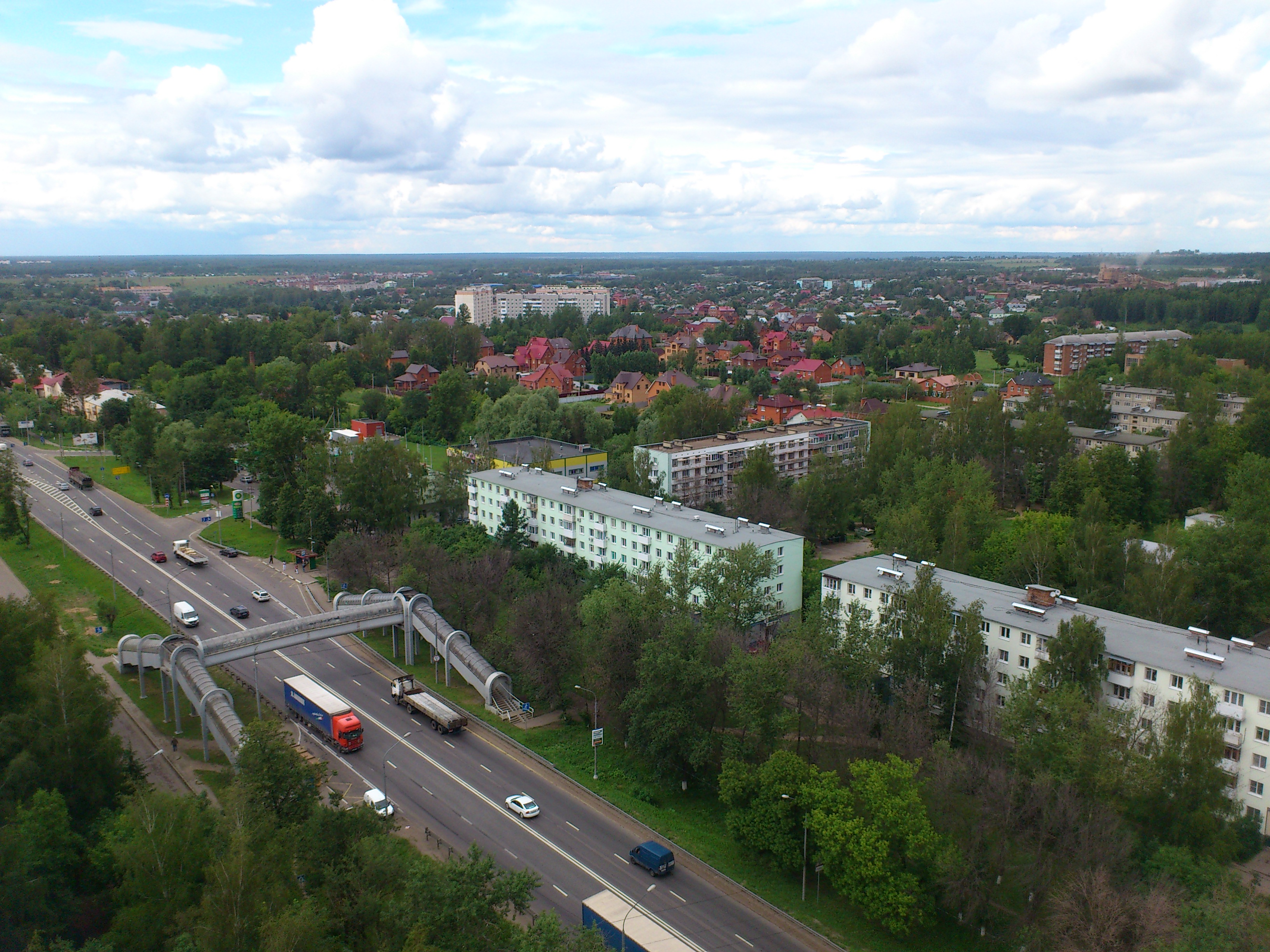
- Klin, Klinsky District

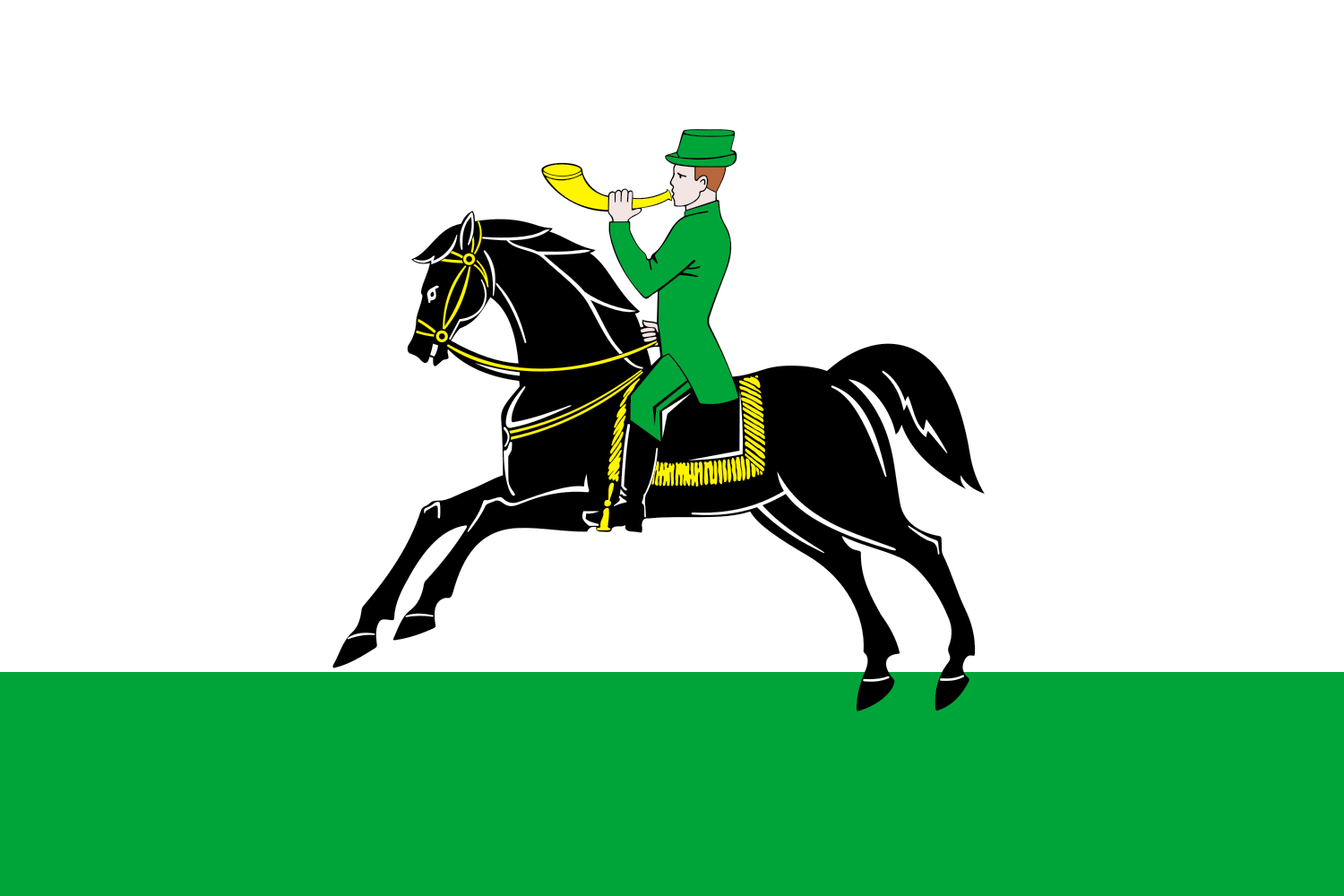
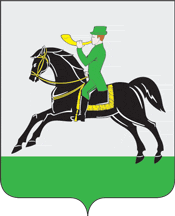
- Flag Coat of arms
- Location of Klinsky District in Moscow Oblast (before July 2012)
- Coordinates: 56°20′N 36°43′E
- Country: Russia
- Federal subject: Moscow Oblast
- Established: 1929
- Administrative center: Klin

Area
  - Total: 2,019.62 km^{2} (779.78 sq mi)

Population (2010 Census)
  - Total: 127,779
  - Density: 63.2688/km^{2} (163.866/sq mi)
  - Urban: 73.8%
  - Rural: 26.2%

Administrative structure
  - Administrative divisions: 2 Towns, 1 Work settlements, 5 Rural settlements
  - Inhabited localities: 2 cities/towns, 1 urban-type settlements, 262 rural localities

Municipal structure
  - Municipally incorporated as: Klinsky Municipal District
  - Municipal divisions: 3 urban settlements, 5 rural settlements
- Time zone: UTC+3 (MSK)
- OKTMO ID: 46621000
- Website: http://www.klincity.ru/

Klinsky District (Russian: Кли́нский райо́н) is an administrative and municipal district (raion), one of the thirty-six in Moscow Oblast, Russia. It is located in the northwest of the oblast and borders with Tver Oblast in the north, Lotoshinsky District in the northwest, Volokolamsky District in the west, Istrinsky District in the south, Solnechnogorsky District in the southeast, and with Dmitrovsky District in the east. The area of the district is 2,019.62 square kilometers (779.78 sq mi). Its administrative center is the town of Klin. Population: 127,779 (2010 census); 127,938 (2002 Census); 48,658 (1989 Soviet census). The population of Klin accounts for 63.1% of the district's total population.

== Geography ==
The northern part of the district is mostly flat, while the southern part is mostly hilly. About half of the district's territory is covered by forests. The Sestra River flows through the district.

== History ==
It was originally called the Klinskaya volost, but in 1929 it was renamed the Klinsky district. In 2019 It became part of the Solnechnogorsk City District, and in 2022 the Klin city district was formed.

== Attractions ==
- Tchaikovsky House-Museum

== Sources ==
- Московская областная Дума. Закон №11/2013-ОЗ от 31 января 2013 г. «Об административно-территориальном устройстве Московской области», в ред. Закона №249/2019-ОЗ от 29 ноября 2019 г. «О внесении изменений в Закон Московской области "Об административно-территориальном устройстве Московской области"». Вступил в силу на следующий день после официального опубликования (13 января 2013 г.). Опубликован: "Ежедневные Новости. Подмосковье", №24, 12 февраля 2013 г. (Moscow Oblast Duma. Law #11/2013-OZ of January 31, 2013 On the Administrative-Territorial Structure of Moscow Oblast, as amended by the Law #249/2019-OZ of November 29, 2019 On amending the Law of Moscow Oblast "On the Administrative-Territorial Structure of Moscow Oblast". Effective as of the day following the day of the official publication (January 13, 2013).).
- Губернатор Московской области. Постановление №123-ПГ от 28 сентября 2010 г. «Об учётных данных административно-территориальных и территориальных единиц Московской области», в ред. Постановления №252-ПГ от 26 июня 2015 г. «О внесении изменения в учётные данные административно-территориальных и территориальных единиц Московской области». Опубликован: "Информационный вестник Правительства МО", №10, 30 октября 2010 г. (Governor of Moscow Oblast. Resolution #123-PG of September 28, 2010 On the Inventory Data of the Administrative-Territorial and Territorial Units of Moscow Oblast, as amended by the Resolution #252-PG of June 26, 2015 On Amending the Inventory Data of the Administrative-Territorial and Territorial Units of Moscow Oblast. ).
- Московская областная Дума. Закон №80/2005-ОЗ от 28 февраля 2005 г. «О статусе и границах Клинского муниципального района и вновь образованных в его составе муниципальных образований», в ред. Закона №36/2011-ОЗ от 25 марта 2011 г. «О внесении изменений в Закон Московской области "О статусе и границах Клинского муниципального района и вновь образованных в его составе муниципальных образований", Закон Московской области "О статусе и границах Солнечногорского муниципального района и вновь образованных в его составе муниципальных образований", Закон Московской области "О статусе и границах Истринского муниципального района и вновь образованных в его составе муниципальных образований"». Вступил в силу со дня официального опубликования. Опубликован: "Ежедневные Новости. Подмосковье", №44, 12 марта 2005 г. (Moscow Oblast Duma. Law #80/2005-OZ of February 28, 2005 On the Status and the Borders of Klinsky Municipal District and the Newly Established Municipal Formations Comprising It, as amended by the Law #36/2011-OZ of March 25, 2011 On Amending the Law of Moscow Oblast "On the Status and the Borders of Klinsky Municipal District and the Newly Established Municipal Formations Comprising It", the Law of Moscow Oblast "On the Status and the Borders of Solnechnogorsky Municipal District and the Newly Established Municipal Formations Comprising It", the Law of Moscow Oblast "On the Status and the Borders of Istrinsky Municipal District and the Newly Established Municipal Formations Comprising It". Effective as of the day of the official publication.).
