= Zavidovo =

Village in Konakovsky District, Tver Oblast, Russia

Zavidovo Завидово
- Selo
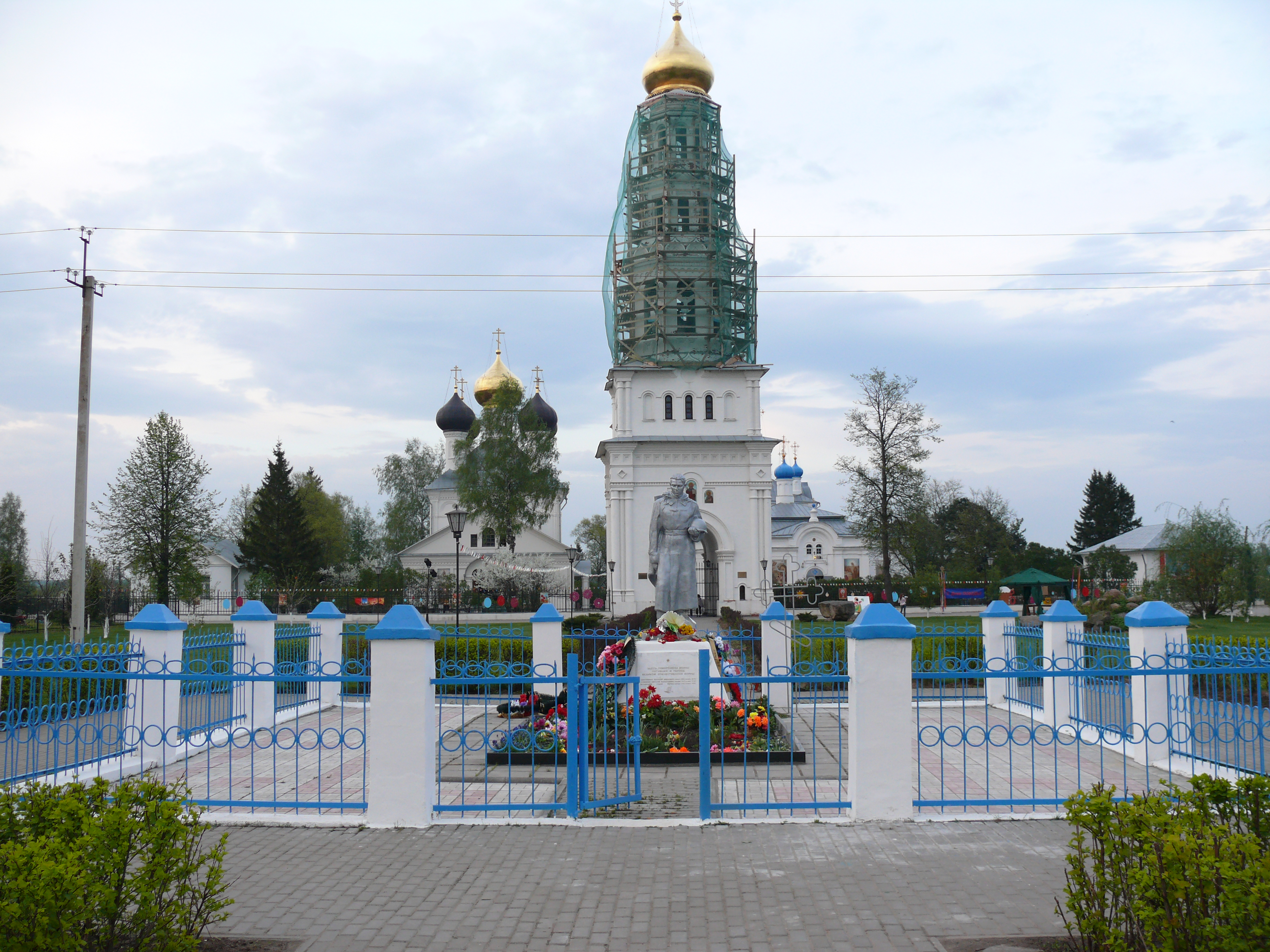
- World War II monument in Zavidovo
- Interactive map of Zavidovo
- Location of Zavidovo Zavidovo (Tver Oblast)
- Coordinates: 56°31′43″N 36°31′34″E
- Country: Russia
- Federal subject: Tver Oblast
- Administrative district: Konakovsky District
- Rural settlementSelsoviet: Zavidovo Rural Settlement
- First mentioned: 1560

Population (2010 Census)
  - Total: 1,395
  - Estimate (2010): 1,395 (0%)

Administrative status
  - Capital of: Shakhovsky Rural Okrug

Municipal status
  - Municipal district: Konakovsky Municipal District
  - Rural settlement: Zavidovo Rural Settlement
- Time zone: UTC+3 (MSK)
- Postal code: 171275
- OKTMO ID: 28630414136

Zavidovo (Russian: Зави́дово) is a village (selo) in Konakovsky District of Tver Oblast, Russia. Next to the village is the location of Rus' state residence, used as an official residence place for the President of Russia.

== Country retreats of the President of Russia ==
- Novo-Ogaryovo
- Bocharov Ruchey

== See also ==
- Foros, Crimea
