= Ivankovo Reservoir =

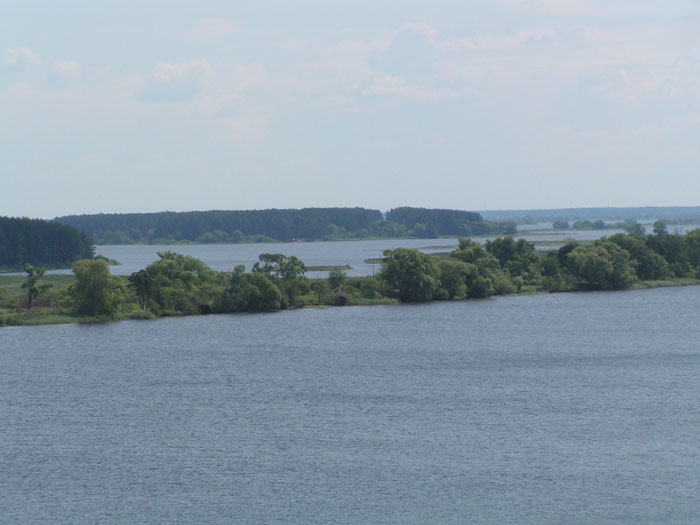

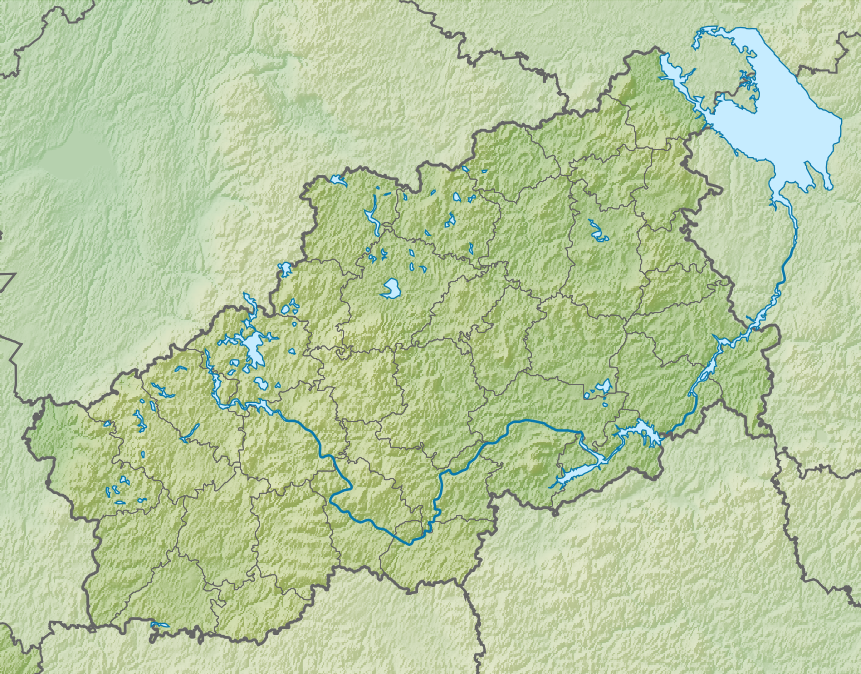
- Location within Tver Oblast Location within European Russia
- Coordinates: 56°45′N 37°04′E
- Type: Hydroelectric reservoir
- Primary inflows: Volga
- Basin countries: Russia
- Max. length: 120 km (75 mi)
- Max. width: 4 km (2.5 mi)
- Surface area: 327 km^{2} (126 sq mi)
- Average depth: 15 m (49 ft)
- Max. depth: 23 m (75 ft)
- Water volume: 1.12 km^{3} (0.27 cu mi)
- Settlements: Konakovo

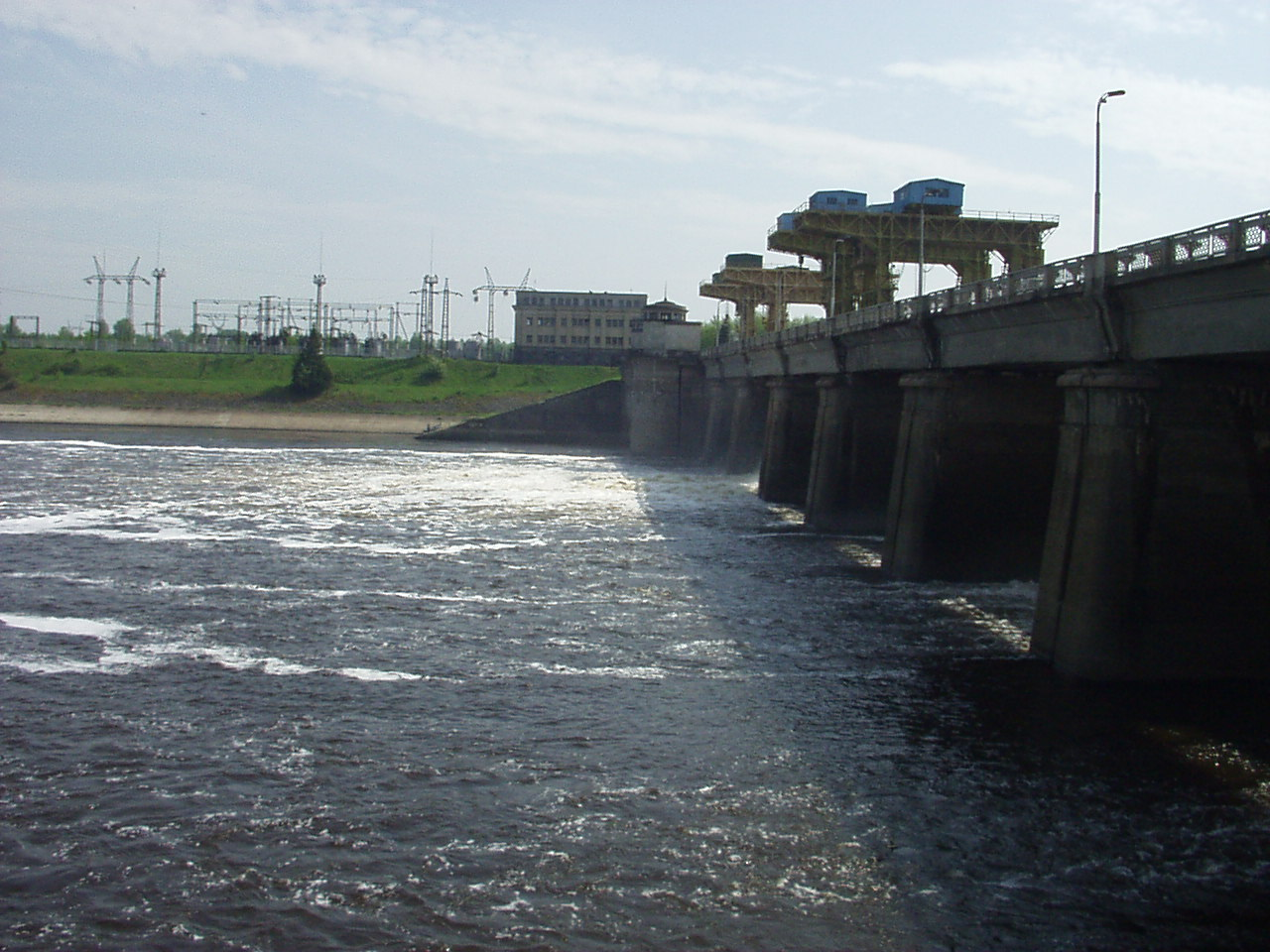
Ivankovo hydro power plant

Ivankovo Reservoir or Ivankovskoye Reservoir (Russian: Иваньковское водохранилище), informally known as the Moscow Sea, is the uppermost reservoir on the Volga, in Moscow and Tver Oblasts of Russia, located some 130 km (81 mi) north of Moscow. The dam of the reservoir is situated in the town of Dubna. The town of Konakovo is located on its southern coast. The reservoir is connected to the Moskva by the Moscow Canal, and is the principal fresh water source for the city of Moscow. Its area is 327 km^{2} (126 sq mi), and the area of its drainage basin is 41,000 km^{2} (16,000 sq mi).

Ivankovo Reservoir is covered by ice between mid-November and mid-April. The water level fluctuates during the year: It dramatically increases after the ice melting, and then stabilizes until January.

The reservoir includes the lower course of the Shosha, its right tributary, the Lama, and the Soz. It is subdivided into three bays (plyoses): The Ivankovo Bay, in the northeast, downstream of the mouth of the Shosha; the Volga Bay, in the northwest, along the Volga upstream of the mouth of the Shosha, and the Shosha Bay, in the west, along the lower course of the Shosha.

The drainage basin of the Ivankovo Reservoir (which includes the basin of the upper course of the Volga) is the whole central part of Tver Oblast, the northwestern part of Moscow Oblast, and some areas in the northeastern part of Smolensk Oblast and in the southwest of Novgorod Oblast. In particular, it includes the cities and towns of Dubna, Konakovo, Kuvshinovo, Likhoslavl, Ostashkov, Rzhev, Staritsa, Tver, Torzhok, Volokolamsk, and Zubtsov.

The reservoir was built in conjunction with the Moscow Canal, and the northern gate of the canal is located at the east of the reservoir. The construction of the dam started in January 1934, completed in 1936, and the reservoir was filled starting from March 23, 1937. On April 17, 1937 the canal was open for traffic. The historic town of Korcheva and a number of villages were submerged as the reservoir was filled. The population was resettled, and some of the buildings were moved from Korcheva to Konakovo. In total, an area of 254.60 square kilometres (98.30 mi^{2}) went under water.
