= Klinsky Uyezd =

Subdivision of the Moscow Governorate

Klinsky Uyezd (Клинский уезд) was one of the subdivisions of the Moscow Governorate of the Russian Empire. It was situated in the northern part of the governorate. Its administrative centre was Klin.

== Demographics ==
At the time of the Russian Empire Census of 1897, Klinsky Uyezd had a population of 115,162. Of these, 99.7% spoke Russian and 0.1% Latvian as their native language.
