= Spirovsky =

Spirovsky (masculine), Spirovskaya (feminine), or Spirovskoye (neuter) may refer to:

- Spirovsky District, a district of Tver Oblast, Russia
- Spirovskaya, a rural locality (a village) in Vologda Oblast, Russia

== See also ==
- Spirovo
