= Volchina =

Volchina Russian: Волчина
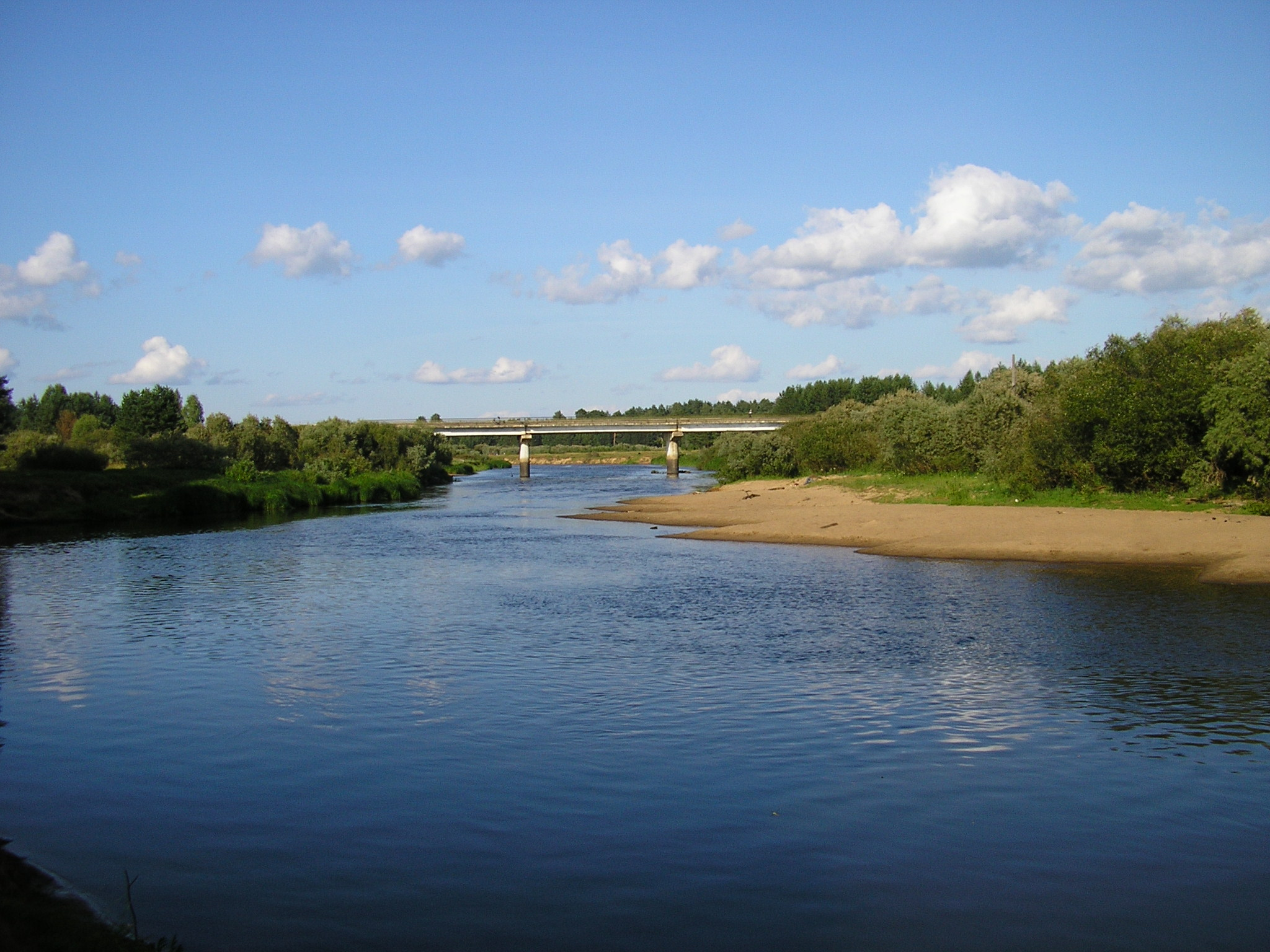
- The Volchina close to its mouth

- Map of the Rybinsk Reservoir basin. The Volchina is shown on the map.

Location
- Country: Russia

Physical characteristics
- Source
  - location: Lake Volchino
- Mouth: Mologa
  - coordinates: 57°49′08″N 35°52′04″E
- Length: 106 km (66 mi)
- Basin size: 3,050 km^{2} (1,180 mi^{2})

Basin features
- Progression: Mologa→ Volga→ Caspian Sea

The Volchina (Russian: Волчина) is a river in Vyshnevolotsky, Udomelsky, and Maksatikhinsky Districts of Tver Oblast in Russia. It is a left tributary of the Mologa. It is 106 kilometres (66 mi) long, and the area of its basin is 3,050 square kilometres (1,180 sq mi). The main tributaries are the Tifina (left) and the Vorozhba (right).

The source of the Volchina is Lake Volchino, shared between Udomelsky (north) and Vyshnevolotsky (south) districts. The outflow of the Volchina is located in Udomelsky District. The river flows northwest, flows into Lake Rogozino, flows out in the southern direction and enters Vyshnevolotsky District. In the village of Ovsishche it turns east, flows along the boundary between the districts, marks a stretch of the boundary, and flows into Lake Perkhovo. From the lake, the Volchina flows east, crosses again into Udomelsky District, forms a stretch of the border between Udomelsky and Maksatikhinsky District, and continues into Maksatikhinsky District. Its mouth is downstream of the urban-type settlement of Maksatikha.

The whole course of the Volchina is heavily populated.

The drainage basin of the Volchina is located in the center of Tver Oblast and is split across seven districts: Udomelsky, Vyshnevolotsky, Spirovsky, Likhoslavlsky, Rameshkovsky, Bezhetsky, and Maksatikhinsky. In particular, the area contains a large number of lakes.
