= Kalashnikovo =

Kalashnikovo (Russian: Кала́шниково) is the name of several inhabited localities in Russia.

== Modern localities ==
Urban localities

- Kalashnikovo, Tver Oblast, an urban-type settlement in Likhoslavlsky District of Tver Oblast

Rural localities

- Kalashnikovo, Perm Krai, a village in Kungursky District of Perm Krai

== Abolished localities ==
- Kalashnikovo, Omsk Oblast, a village in Souskanovsky Rural Okrug of Tarsky District in Omsk Oblast; abolished in November 2008
