= Medvedkovo (rural locality) =

Medvedkovo (Russian: Медведково) is the name of several rural localities in Russia.

== Ivanovo Oblast ==
As of 2010, three rural localities in Ivanovo Oblast bear this name:

- Medvedkovo, Furmanovsky District, Ivanovo Oblast, a selo in Furmanovsky District
- Medvedkovo, Lezhnevsky District, Ivanovo Oblast, a village in Lezhnevsky District
- Medvedkovo, Puchezhsky District, Ivanovo Oblast, a village in Puchezhsky District

== Kirov Oblast ==
As of 2010, one rural locality in Kirov Oblast bears this name:

- Medvedkovo, Kirov Oblast, a village in Novotroitsky Rural Okrug of Shabalinsky District

== Moscow Oblast ==
As of 2010, three rural localities in Moscow Oblast bear this name:

- Medvedkovo, Dmitrovsky District, Moscow Oblast, a village in Gabovskoye Rural Settlement of Dmitrovsky District
- Medvedkovo, Klinsky District, Moscow Oblast, a village under the administrative jurisdiction of the Town of Klin in Klinsky District
- Medvedkovo, Volokolamsky District, Moscow Oblast, a village in Chismenskoye Rural Settlement of Volokolamsky District

== Nizhny Novgorod Oblast ==
As of 2010, three rural localities in Nizhny Novgorod Oblast bear this name:

- Medvedkovo, Bor, Nizhny Novgorod Oblast, a village in Sitnikovsky Selsoviet of the town of oblast significance of Bor
- Medvedkovo, Bolshemurashkinsky District, Nizhny Novgorod Oblast, a village in Grigorovsky Selsoviet of Bolshemurashkinsky District
- Medvedkovo, Perevozsky District, Nizhny Novgorod Oblast, a village in Tanaykovsky Selsoviet of Perevozsky District

== Novgorod Oblast ==
As of 2010, one rural locality in Novgorod Oblast bears this name:

- Medvedkovo, Novgorod Oblast, a village in Fedorkovskoye Settlement of Parfinsky District

== Pskov Oblast ==
As of 2010, five rural localities in Pskov Oblast bear this name:

- Medvedkovo, Nevelsky District, Pskov Oblast, a village in Nevelsky District
- Medvedkovo, Palkinsky District, Pskov Oblast, a village in Palkinsky District
- Medvedkovo, Pechorsky District, Pskov Oblast, a village in Pechorsky District
- Medvedkovo (Uspenskaya Rural Settlement), Velikoluksky District, Pskov Oblast, a village in Velikoluksky District; municipally, a part of Uspenskaya Rural Settlement of that district
- Medvedkovo (Maryinskaya Rural Settlement), Velikoluksky District, Pskov Oblast, a village in Velikoluksky District; municipally, a part of Maryinskaya Rural Settlement of that district

== Smolensk Oblast ==
As of 2010, one rural locality in Smolensk Oblast bears this name:

- Medvedkovo, Smolensk Oblast, a village in Steshinskoye Rural Settlement of Kholm-Zhirkovsky District

== Republic of Tatarstan ==
As of 2010, one rural locality in the Republic of Tatarstan bears this name:

- Medvedkovo, Republic of Tatarstan, a village in Verkhneuslonsky District

== Tver Oblast ==
As of 2010, eight rural localities in Tver Oblast bear this name:

- Medvedkovo, Kashinsky District, Tver Oblast, a village in Pisyakovskoye Rural Settlement of Kashinsky District
- Medvedkovo, Kimrsky District, Tver Oblast, a village in Ustinovskoye Rural Settlement of Kimrsky District
- Medvedkovo, Kuvshinovsky District, Tver Oblast, a village in Borkovskoye Rural Settlement of Kuvshinovsky District
- Medvedkovo, Lesnoy District, Tver Oblast, a settlement in Medvedkovskoye Rural Settlement of Lesnoy District
- Medvedkovo, Maksatikhinsky District, Tver Oblast, a village in Truzhenitskoye Rural Settlement of Maksatikhinsky District
- Medvedkovo, Spirovsky District, Tver Oblast, a village in Kozlovskoye Rural Settlement of Spirovsky District
- Medvedkovo, Torzhoksky District, Tver Oblast, a village in Boristsevskoye Rural Settlement of Torzhoksky District
- Medvedkovo, Vesyegonsky District, Tver Oblast, a village in Chamerovskoye Rural Settlement of Vesyegonsky District

== Vologda Oblast ==
As of 2010, one rural locality in Vologda Oblast bears this name:

- Medvedkovo, Vologda Oblast, a village in Biryakovsky Selsoviet of Sokolsky District

== Yaroslavl Oblast ==
As of 2010, four rural localities in Yaroslavl Oblast bear this name:

- Medvedkovo, Bolsheselsky District, Yaroslavl Oblast, a village in Novoselsky Rural Okrug of Bolsheselsky District
- Medvedkovo, Breytovsky District, Yaroslavl Oblast, a village in Breytovsky Rural Okrug of Breytovsky District
- Medvedkovo, Pervomaysky District, Yaroslavl Oblast, a village in Uritsky Rural Okrug of Pervomaysky District
- Medvedkovo, Yaroslavsky District, Yaroslavl Oblast, a village in Ivnyakovsky Rural Okrug of Yaroslavsky District
