= Spirovo =

Spirovo (Russian: Спирово) is the name of several inhabited localities in Russia.

== Arkhangelsk Oblast ==
As of 2010, one rural locality in Arkhangelsk Oblast bears this name:

- Spirovo, Arkhangelsk Oblast, a village in Khotenovsky Selsoviet of Kargopolsky District

== Leningrad Oblast ==
As of 2010, four rural localities in Leningrad Oblast bear this name:

- Spirovo, Anisimovskoye Settlement Municipal Formation, Boksitogorsky District, Leningrad Oblast, a village in Anisimovskoye Settlement Municipal Formation of Boksitogorsky District
- Spirovo, Yefimovskoye Settlement Municipal Formation, Boksitogorsky District, Leningrad Oblast, a village in Yefimovskoye Settlement Municipal Formation of Boksitogorsky District
- Spirovo, Lodeynopolsky District, Leningrad Oblast, a village in Alekhovshchinskoye Settlement Municipal Formation of Lodeynopolsky District
- Spirovo, Volkhovsky District, Leningrad Oblast, a village in Pashskoye Settlement Municipal Formation of Volkhovsky District

== Moscow Oblast ==
As of 2010, two rural localities in Moscow Oblast bear this name:

- Spirovo, Podolsky District, Moscow Oblast, a village in Strelkovskoye Rural Settlement of Podolsky District
- Spirovo, Volokolamsky District, Moscow Oblast, a selo in Teryayevskoye Rural Settlement of Volokolamsky District

== Novgorod Oblast ==
As of 2010, one rural locality in Novgorod Oblast bears this name:

- Spirovo, Novgorod Oblast, a village in Bykovskoye Settlement of Pestovsky District

== Pskov Oblast ==
As of 2010, one rural locality in Pskov Oblast bears this name:

- Spirovo, Pskov Oblast, a village in Bezhanitsky District

== Tver Oblast ==
As of 2010, five inhabited localities in Tver Oblast bear this name.

Urban localities

- Spirovo, Spirovsky District, Tver Oblast, an urban-type settlement in Spirovsky District

Rural localities

- Spirovo, Kimrsky District, Tver Oblast, a village in Neklyudovskoye Rural Settlement of Kimrsky District
- Spirovo, Lesnoy District, Tver Oblast, a village in Lesnoye Rural Settlement of Lesnoy District
- Spirovo, Penkovskoye Rural Settlement, Spirovsky District, Tver Oblast, a village in Penkovskoye Rural Settlement of Spirovsky District
- Spirovo, Torzhoksky District, Tver Oblast, a village in Rudnikovskoye Rural Settlement of Torzhoksky District

== Vologda Oblast ==
As of 2010, two rural localities in Vologda Oblast bear this name:

- Spirovo, Babayevsky District, Vologda Oblast, a village in Saninsky Selsoviet of Babayevsky District
- Spirovo, Cherepovetsky District, Vologda Oblast, a village in Korotovsky Selsoviet of Cherepovetsky District

== Yaroslavl Oblast ==
As of 2010, one rural locality in Yaroslavl Oblast bears this name:

- Spirovo, Yaroslavl Oblast, a village in Bolsheselsky Rural Okrug of Bolsheselsky District
