= Tifina =

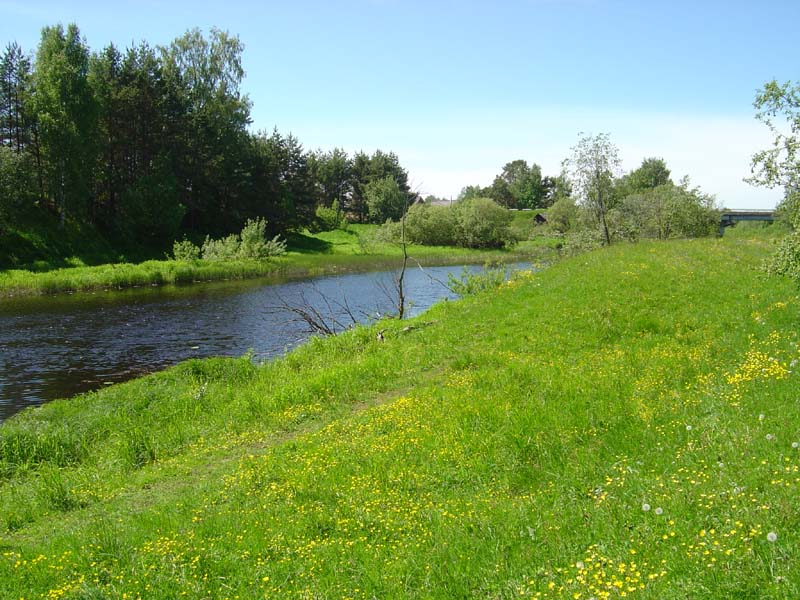
- The Tifina
- Native name: Тифина (Russian)

Location
- Country: Russia

Physical characteristics
- Mouth: Volchina
  - coordinates: 57°45′40″N 35°45′13″E
- Length: 128 km (80 mi)
- Basin size: 1,180 km^{2} (460 sq mi)

Basin features
- Progression: Volchina→ Mologa→ Volga→ Caspian Sea

The Tifina (Russian: Тифина), also known as the Tikhvinka (Russian: Тихвинка), is a river in Bezhetsky, Rameshkovsky, Maksatikhinsky, Likhoslavlsky, and Spirovsky Districts of Tver Oblast in Russia. It is a right tributary of the Volchina and belongs to the drainage basin of the Volga. It is 128 kilometres (80 mi) long, and the area of its basin 1,180 square kilometres (460 sq mi). The principal tributary is the Sudomlya (left).

The source of the Tifina is located in the southwestern corner of Bezhetsky District, close to the village of Kleymikha. The river flows west, its short stretch makes a border between Rameshkovsky and Maksatikhinsky District. Further downstream, the Tifina crosses the southern part of Maksatikhinsky District, turns northwest, crosses the northwestern part of Likhoslavlsky District, makes a stretch of the border between Likhoslavlsky and Maksatikhinsky Districts, crosses back into Maksatikhinsky District, turns west and makes a stretch of the border between Spirovsky and Likhoslavlsky Districts. It accepts the Svetcha River from the left, turns northwest, and at the village of Medvedkovo sharply turns east. It crosses back into Maksatikhinsky District and turns north. The mouth of the Tifina is by the village of Novopavlovskoye.

The drainage basin of the Tifina includes the southwestern part of Maksatikhinsky District, the northeastern parts of Likhoslavlsky and Spirovsky Districts, as well as minor areas in Bezhetsky, Rameshkovsky, Vyshnevolotsky, and Udomelsky Districts.
