= Rameshki =

Rameshki (Russian: Рамешки) is the name of several inhabited localities in Russia.

== Kostroma Oblast ==
As of 2010, two rural localities in Kostroma Oblast bear this name:

- Rameshki, Kologrivsky District, Kostroma Oblast, a village in Ilyinskoye Settlement of Kologrivsky District
- Rameshki, Nerekhtsky District, Kostroma Oblast, a village in Voskresenskoye Settlement of Nerekhtsky District

== Nizhny Novgorod Oblast ==
As of 2010, four rural localities in Nizhny Novgorod Oblast bear this name:

- Rameshki, Bolshemurashkinsky District, Nizhny Novgorod Oblast, a village in Kholyazinsky Selsoviet of Bolshemurashkinsky District
- Rameshki, Koverninsky District, Nizhny Novgorod Oblast, a village in Gorevsky Selsoviet of Koverninsky District
- Rameshki, Kstovsky District, Nizhny Novgorod Oblast, a village in Chernyshikhinsky Selsoviet of Kstovsky District
- Rameshki, Sokolsky District, Nizhny Novgorod Oblast, a village in Loyminsky Selsoviet of Sokolsky District

== Tver Oblast ==
As of 2010, four inhabited localities in Tver Oblast bear this name.

Urban localities

- Rameshki, Rameshkovsky District, Tver Oblast, an urban-type settlement in Rameshkovsky District

Rural localities

- Rameshki, Maksatikhinsky District, Tver Oblast, a village in Trestenskoye Rural Settlement of Maksatikhinsky District
- Rameshki, Molokovsky District, Tver Oblast, a village in Molokovskoye Rural Settlement of Molokovsky District
- Rameshki, Sonkovsky District, Tver Oblast, a village in Belyanitskoye Rural Settlement of Sonkovsky District

== Vologda Oblast ==
As of 2010, two rural localities in Vologda Oblast bear this name:

- Rameshki, Gryazovetsky District, Vologda Oblast, a village in Pertsevsky Selsoviet of Gryazovetsky District
- Rameshki, Nikolsky District, Vologda Oblast, a village in Osinovsky Selsoviet of Nikolsky District
