= Kalashnikovo, Tver Oblast =

Kalashnikovo Калашниково
- Work settlement
- Interactive map of Kalashnikovo
- Location of Kalashnikovo Kalashnikovo (Tver Oblast)
- Coordinates: 57°17′0″N 35°13′52″E
- Country: Russia
- Federal subject: Tver Oblast
- Administrative district: Likhoslavlsky District
- First mention: 1779
- Urban-type settlement status since: 1932

Population (2010 Census)
  - Total: 5,001
  - Estimate (2021): 4,226 (−15.5%)

Municipal status
  - Municipal district: Likhoslavlsky Municipal District
  - Urban settlement: Urban Settlement Kalashnikovo
  - Capital of: Urban Settlement Kalashnikovo
- Time zone: UTC+3 (MSK)
- Postal code: 171205
- OKTMO ID: 28638155051

Kalashnikovo (Russian: Кала́шниково) is an urban locality (an urban-type settlement) in Likhoslavlsky District of Tver Oblast, Russia. Population: 5,001 (2010 census); 5,198 (2002 census); 5,572 (1989 Soviet census).

== History ==
Kalashnikovo was first mentioned in 1779 as a village belonging to the selo of Yegoryevskoye. At the time, it belonged to Novotorzhsky Uyezd of Tver Viceroyalty. In 1796, the viceroyalty was transformed to Tver Governorate. The village has grown considerably after the railway construction was completed in 1851, and even more after the glass factory has been constructed in 1886–1887. In 1918, the factory was nationalized.

On July 12, 1929 the governorates and uyezds were abolished. Likhoslavlsky District, with the administrative center in Likhoslavl, was established within Tver Okrug of Moscow Oblast. On July 23, 1930, the okrugs were abolished, and the districts were directly subordinated to the oblast. In 1932, Kalashnikovo was granted urban-type settlement status. On January 29, 1935 Kalinin Oblast was established, and Likhoslavlsky District was transferred to Kalinin Oblast. On July 9, 1937 Likhoslavlsky District was included into Karelian National Okrug, which was established as a Tver Karelians autonomy. On February 7, 1939 the okrug was abolished. In February 1963, during the abortive administrative reform by Nikita Khrushchev, Likhoslavlsky District was merged into Torzhoksky District, but on March 4, 1964, it was re-established. In 1990, Kalinin Oblast was renamed Tver Oblast.

== Economy ==
=== Industry ===
As of 2014, the only industrial enterprise in Kalashnikovo produced electric lamps. This was the glassmaking factory founded in the 19th century.

=== Transportation ===
Kalashnikovo is served by a station on the Moscow – Saint Petersburg Railway. It is connected by road with Torzhok, whereby it has access to the M10 highway connecting Moscow and Saint Petersburg.
