= Likhoslavlsky District =

Likhoslavlsky District Лихославльский район (Russian)
- District
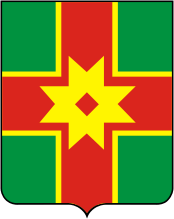
- Flag Coat of arms
- Location of Likhoslavlsky District in Tver Oblast
- Coordinates: 57°07′N 35°28′E
- Country: Russia
- Federal subject: Tver Oblast
- Established: 12 July 1929
- Administrative center: Likhoslavl

Area
  - Total: 1,781 km^{2} (688 sq mi)

Population (2010 Census)
  - Total: 28,492
  - Density: 16.00/km^{2} (41.43/sq mi)
  - Urban: 60.6%
  - Rural: 39.4%

Administrative structure
  - Administrative divisions: 1 Urban settlements (towns), 1 Urban settlements (urban-type settlements), 10 Rural settlements
  - Inhabited localities: 1 cities/towns, 1 urban-type settlements, 246 rural localities

Municipal structure
  - Municipally incorporated as: Likhoslavlsky Municipal District
  - Municipal divisions: 2 urban settlements, 10 rural settlements
- Time zone: UTC+3 (MSK)
- OKTMO ID: 28538000
- Website: http://lihoslavl69.ru/

Likhoslavlsky District (Russian: Лихосла́вльский райо́н) is an administrative and municipal district (raion), one of the thirty-six in Tver Oblast, Russia. It is located in the center of the oblast and borders with Maksatikhinsky District in the north, Rameshkovsky District in the east, Kalininsky District in the south, Torzhoksky District in the southwest, and with Spirovsky District in the northwest. The area of the district is 1,781 square kilometers (688 sq mi). Its administrative center is the town of Likhoslavl. Population: 28,492 (2010 Census); 30,079 (2002 census); 33,942 (1989 Soviet census). The population of Likhoslavl accounts for 43.0% of the district's total population.

== Geography ==
The area of the district is elongated from south to north. The whole area belongs to the river basin of the Volga River and is split between three of its major tributaries. The rivers in the northern part of the district drain into the Tifina, in the basin of the Mologa River. The central part of the district belongs to the drainage basin of the Medveditsa River. The southern part of the district belongs to the basin of the Tvertsa River. Both the Tifina and the Medveditsa cross the district.

== History ==
In the Middle Ages, the area belonged to the Novgorod Republic. In 1238, the Mongols were advancing from Bezhetsk towards Tver and engaged in a battle with Slavs at the banks of the Medveditsa, currently within the area of the district. Mongols won the battle and got the control of the area. After the Novgorod Republic has been annexed by the Grand Duchy of Moscow in the end of the 15th century, the area was a part of the Bezhetsk pyatina, one of the five into which the Novgorod lands were divided. The village of Ostashkovo, which later was merged into the town of Likhoslavl, was first mentioned in 1624.

In the course of the administrative reform carried out in 1708 by Peter the Great, the area was included into Ingermanlandia Governorate (since 1710 known as Saint Petersburg Governorate). In 1727 part of it was transferred to the newly established Novgorod Governorate, and the rest to Moscow Governorate. In 1775, Tver Viceroyalty was formed from the lands which previously belonged to Moscow and Novgorod Governorates, and the whole area was transferred to Tver Viceroyalty, which in 1796 was transformed to Tver Governorate. The area was split between Tverskoy, Bezhetsky, and Novotorzhsky Uyezds. In 1925, Likhoslavl was granted town status.

On July 12, 1929 the governorates and uyezds were abolished. Likhoslavlsky District, with the administrative center in Likhoslavl, was established within Tver Okrug of Moscow Oblast. On July 23, 1930, the okrugs were abolished, and the districts were directly subordinated to the oblast. On January 29, 1935 Kalinin Oblast was established, and Likhoslavlsky District was transferred to Kalinin Oblast. On July 9, 1937 Likhoslavlsky District was included into Karelian National Okrug, which was established as a Tver Karelians autonomy. On February 7, 1939 the okrug was abolished. In February 1963, during the abortive administrative reform by Nikita Khrushchev, Likhoslavlsky District was merged into Torzhoksky District, but on March 4, 1964, it was re-established. In 1990, Kalinin Oblast was renamed Tver Oblast.

Another district created on July 12, 1929 was Tolmachyovsky District with the administrative center in the selo of Tolmachi. It was a part of Tver Okrug of Moscow Oblast. On January 29, 1935 the district was transferred to Kalinin Oblast, and on March 5, 1935, it was renamed Novokarelsky District. On July 9, 1937 it was transferred to Karelian National Okrug. On July 4, 1956 the district was abolished and split between Spirovsky and Likhoslavlsky Districts.

== Economy ==
=== Industry ===
There are enterprises of electrotechnical, ceramic, and food industries in the district.

=== Agriculture ===
The main agricultural specialization of the district is cattle breeding with meat and milk production.

=== Transportation ===
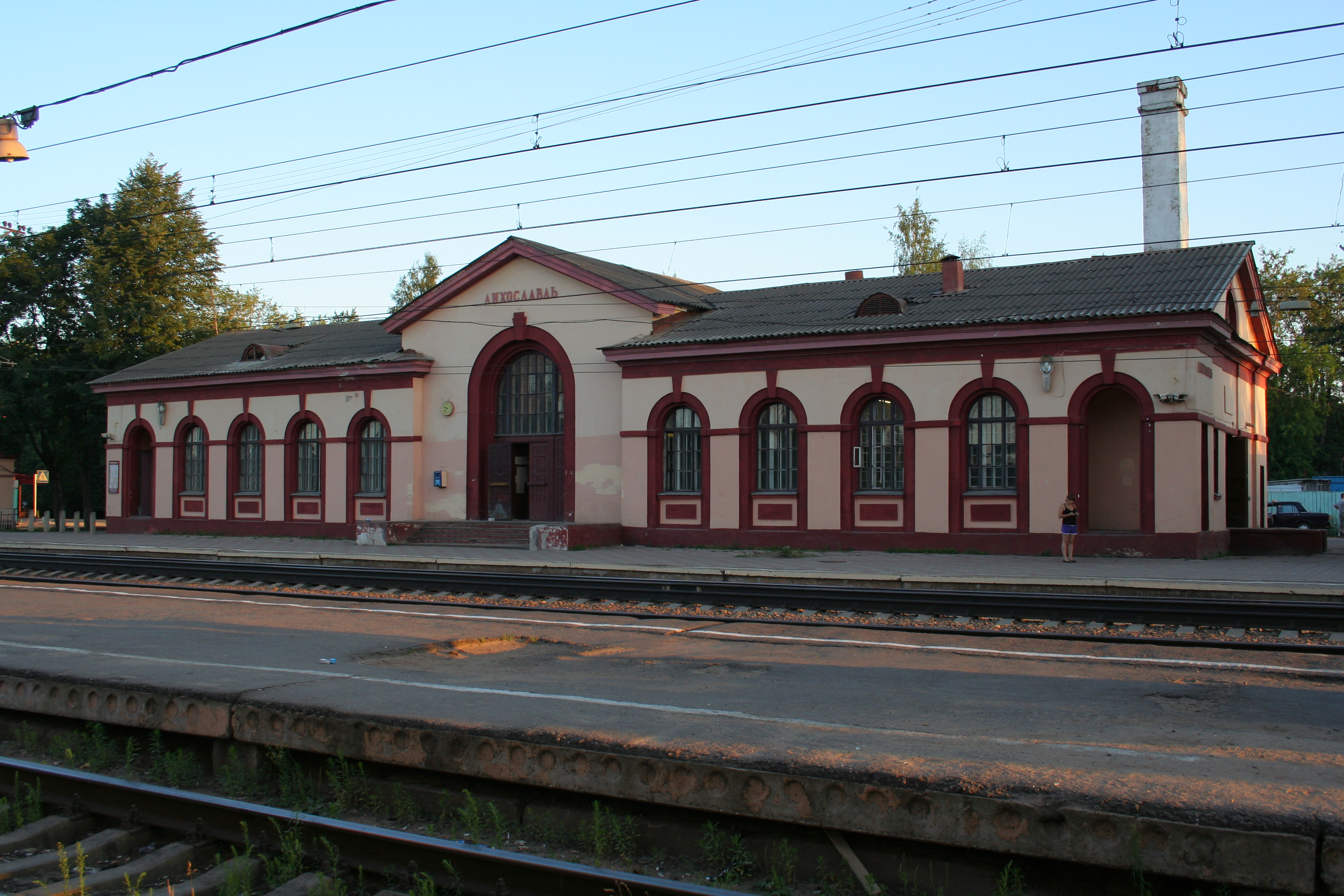
Likhoslavl railway station

The railway connecting Moscow and Saint Petersburg crosses the southwestern part of the district. The biggest stations within the district are Likhoslavl and Kalashnikovo. In Likhoslavl, a railway branches west and leads to Torzhok and further to Ostashkov and Rzhev.

Likhoslavl and Kalashnikovo are connected by road with Torzhok, where they have access to the M10 highway connecting Moscow and Saint Petersburg. Likhoslavl is also connected by road with Mednoye, where it has another access to M10. There are also local roads with bus traffic originating from Likhoslavl.

== Culture and recreation ==
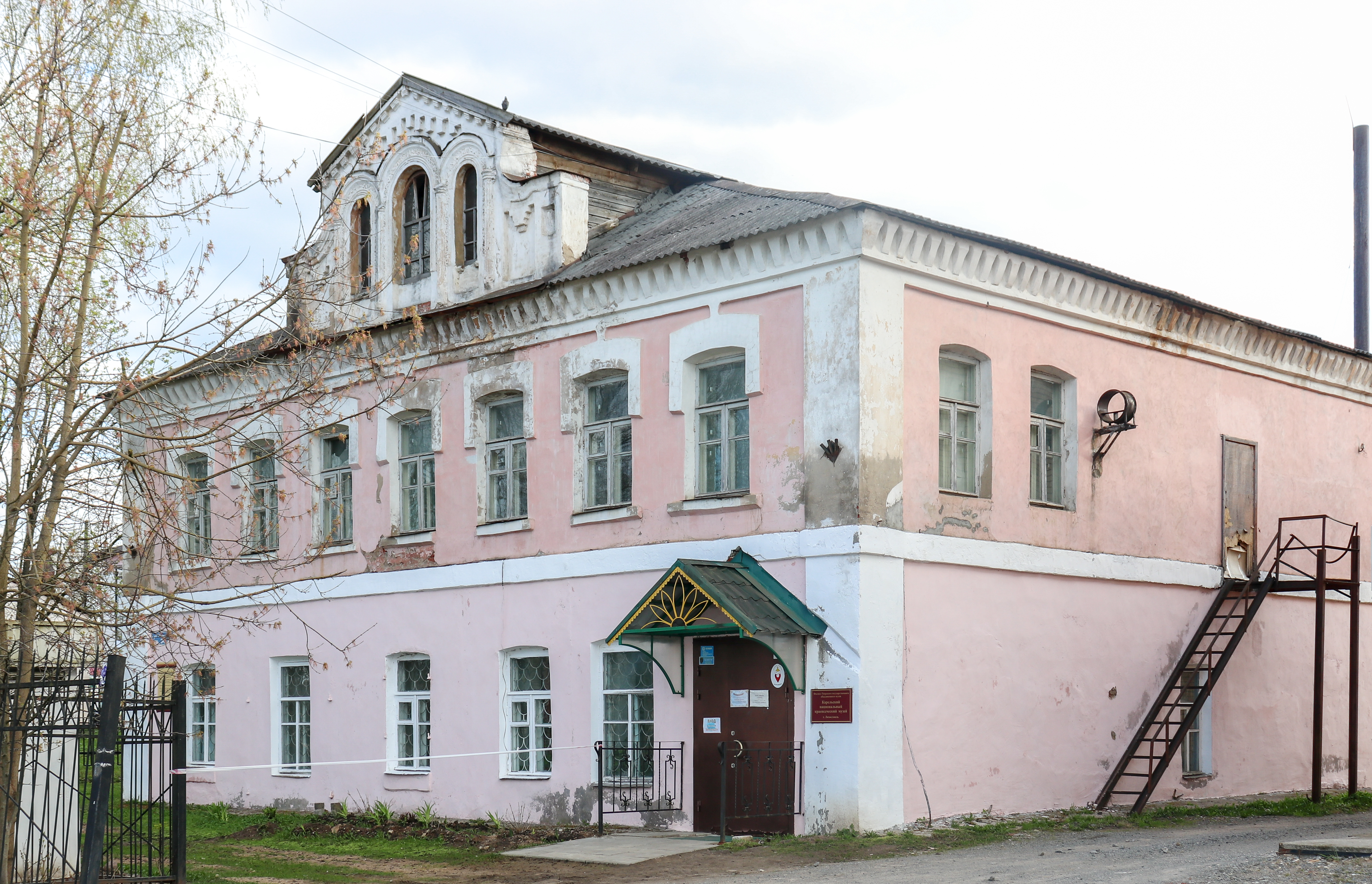
Karelian National Museum, Likhoslavl

The district contains seven cultural heritage monuments of federal significance and additionally fifty objects classified as cultural and historical heritage of local significance (seven of them located in Likhoslavl). The federal monuments are the Saint Nicholas Church in the selo of Zmeyevo, the Intercession Church in the selo of Stan, and the Pervitino estate with the Trinity Church in the selo of Pervitino.

Likhoslavlsky District is one of four districts of Tver Oblast with a significant number of Tver Karelians. In Likhoslavl, there is a local museum mostly devoted to Tver Karelian culture and ethnography.
