= Medvedkovo =

Medvedkovo may refer to:

- Medvedkovo (Moscow Metro), a station of the Moscow Metro, Moscow, Russia
- Medvedkovo (rural locality), several rural localities in Russia

== See also ==
- Severnoye Medvedkovo District, a district of Moscow, Russia
- Yuzhnoye Medvedkovo District, a district of Moscow, Russia
