= Karelian National Okrug =

National district within Kalinin Oblast of the RSFSR (1937-1939)

Coordinates: 57°07′N 35°28′E

Karelian National Okrug Карельский национальный округ
- National Okrug of the Soviet Union
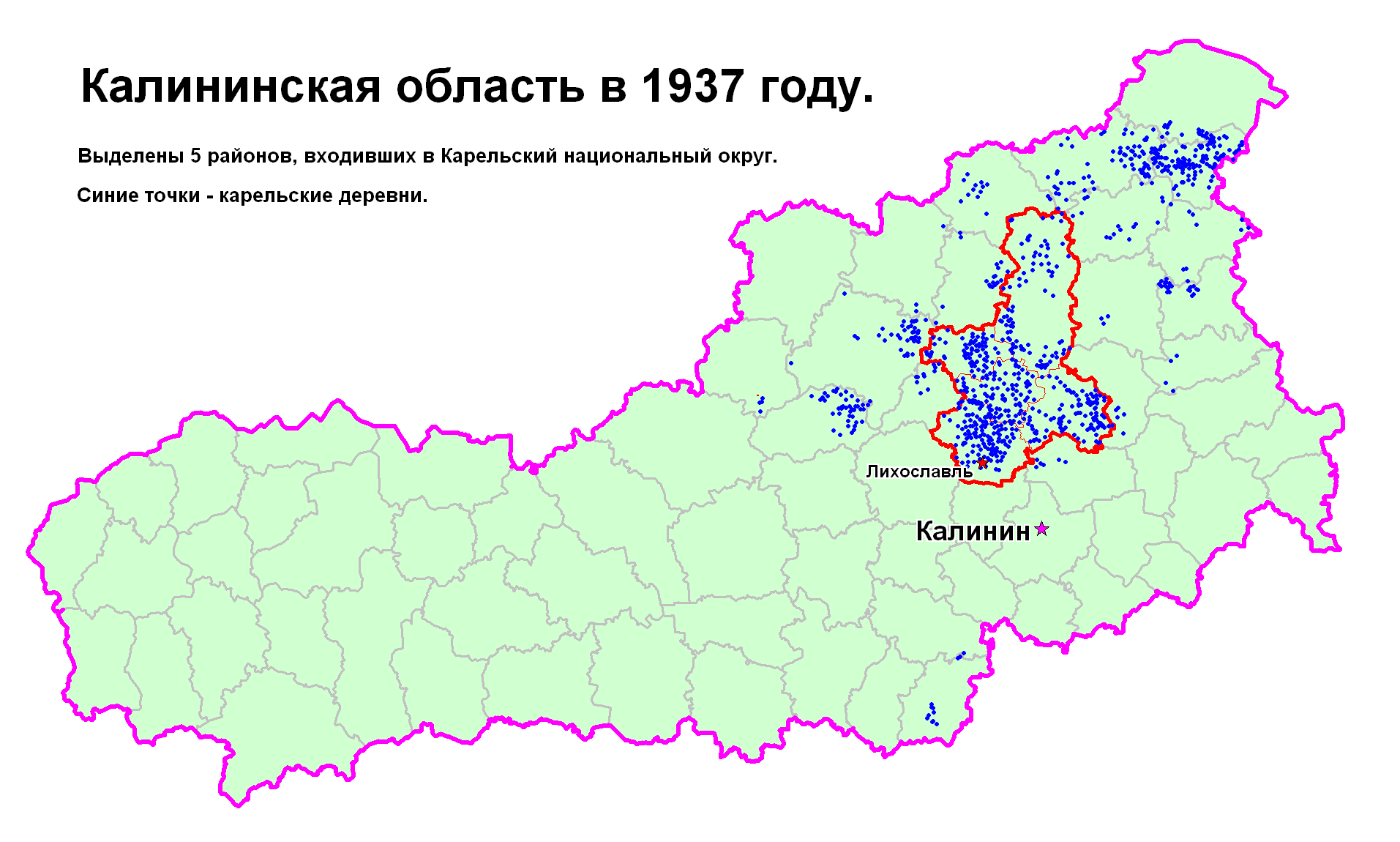
- Karelian National Okrug on the map of Kalinin Oblast
- Capital: Likhoslavl
- History
  - Established: July 9, 1937
  - Disestablished: February 7, 1939
- Political subdivisions: 5 districts

Karelian National Okrug (Russian: Карельский национальный о́круг, Karelsky Natsionalny okrug), was a territory with special status within Kalinin Oblast, Soviet Union. It existed between 1937 and 1939 and was intended to be a Tver Karelians autonomy. Its administrative center was located in the town of Likhoslavl. The population of the okrug was 170,000, of which 65% were Tver Karelians.

== History ==
Karelian National Okrug was established on July 9, 1937 by the decree of the Central Executive Committee of the Soviet Union. It included four previously established districts of Kalinin Oblast — Likhoslavlsky (with the administrative center in the town of Likhoslavl), Maksatikhinsky (urban-type settlement of Maksatikha), Rameshkovsky (selo of Rameshki), and Novokarelsky (selo of Tolmachi) districts, as well as a newly established one, Kozlovsky District (selo of Kozlovo). The Karelian population of the okrug was about 95 thousand, whereas about 25 thousand Tver Karelians lived in districts of Kalinin Oblast which were not included in the okrug.

After the creation of the okrug, a large effort started in creation of a written Tver Karelian language, led by the philologist Dmitry Bubrikh. Tver Karelian first used the Latin alphabet, but in September 1937 central authorities ordered that it should be switched to the Cyrillic alphabet. In January 1938, during the Great Purge, Bubrikh was arrested and charged with counter-revolutionary activity. He was sentenced to death, but his sentence was subsequently commuted. Later, other specialists working on the Tver Karelian language, as well as the authorities of the okrug, were arrested. Most of them were subsequently acquitted.

On February 7, 1939, the okrug was abolished, and the districts were subordinated to Kalinin Oblast.

During the subsequent changes in the administrative divisions, Novokarelsky district was split between Likhoslavlsky and Spirovsky districts, and Kozlovsky district was split between Spirovsky and Maksatikhinsky districts. On July 17, 1990, Kalinin Oblast was renamed Tver Oblast. Thus, the former area of Karelian National Okrug is currently split between Likhoslavlsky, Maksatikhinsky, Rameshkovsky, and Spirovsky districts.
