= Spirovo, Spirovsky District, Tver Oblast =

Spirovo Спирово
- Work settlement
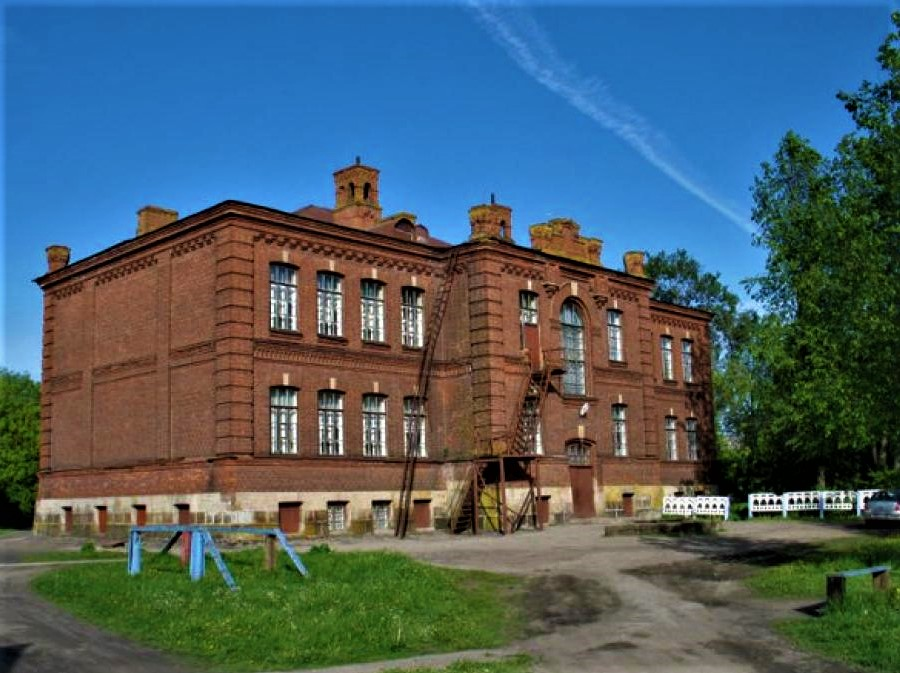
- Interactive map of Spirovo
- Location of Spirovo Spirovo (Tver Oblast)
- Coordinates: 57°25′08″N 34°59′27″E
- Country: Russia
- Federal subject: Tver Oblast
- Administrative district: Spirovsky District
- Founded: 1847

Population (2010 Census)
  - Total: 6,267
  - Estimate (2021): 5,194 (−17.1%)

Administrative status
  - Capital of: Spirovsky District

Municipal status
  - Municipal district: Spirovsky Municipal District
  - Urban settlement: Spirovskoye Urban Settlement
  - Capital of: Spirovsky Municipal District, Spirovskoye Urban Settlement
- Time zone: UTC+3 (MSK)
- Postal code: 171170
- OKTMO ID: 28652151051

Spirovo (Russian: Спи́рово) is an urban-type settlement and the administrative center of Spirovsky District of Tver Oblast, Russia. Population: 6,267 (2010 census); 6,859 (2002 census); 6,896 (1989 Soviet census). It is located on the banks of the Malaya Tigma River.

== History ==
Spirovo was founded in 1847 to serve the railway station at the Moscow – Saint Petersburg Railway. At the time, it belonged to Vyshnevolotsky Uyezd of Tver Governorate. In 1886, a glass-making factory started operation, and in 1908, a railway school was opened.

On July 12, 1929 the governorates and uyezds were abolished. Spirovsky District, with the administrative center in Spirovo, was established within Tver Okrug of Moscow Oblast. On July 23, 1930, the okrugs were abolished, and the districts were directly subordinated to the oblast. On January 29, 1935 Kalinin Oblast was established, and Spirovsky District was transferred to Kalinin Oblast. In February 1963, during the abortive administrative reform by Nikita Khrushchev, Spirovsky District was merged into Vyshnevolotsky District, but on January 12, 1965 it was re-established. During this period, Spirovo was administratively a part of the town of Vyshny Volochyok. In 1990, Kalinin Oblast was renamed Tver Oblast.

== Economy ==
=== Industry ===
The glass-making factory was built in Spirovo in 1886 by merchant Kruglov and is still in operation. It is the largest enterprise in the settlement. There are also enterprises of food industry.

=== Transportation ===
Spirovo has a railway station on the railway connecting Moscow and St. Petersburg.

It also has access to the M10 highway, which connects Moscow and St. Petersburg. There are local roads as well, with the bus traffic originating from Spirovo.

== Culture and recreation ==
The settlement contains six cultural heritage monuments of local significance. These include monuments to soldiers fallen in World War II as well as two buildings of historical significance.

Spirovo has a local museum.
