= Monastery of St. Nicholas in Terebeni =

Russian Orthodox monastery, Oblast, Russia

Monastery of Saint Nicholas
- Location within European Russia
- Interactive map of Monastery of Saint Nicholas

Monastery information
- Other names: Nikolo-Terebensky monastery, Nikolo-Terebenskaya pustyn
- Order: Orthodox
- Established: 17th century
- Disestablished: 1930s
- Diocese: Bezhetsk

People
- Founder: Abraham from Zaonezhye
- Prior: Theodore (Zelenov)

Site
- Location: Truzhenik, Maksatikhinsky District, Tver Oblast, Russia
- Coordinates: 58°00′33″N 35°39′30″E
- Website: nik-ter.ru

Monastery of St. Nicholas (Russian: Николо-Теребенская пустынь, "Nicholas Terebeni pustyn") is a Russian Orthodox monastery located in Truzhenik settlement (former Terebeni) in Tver Oblast, Russia.

== History ==
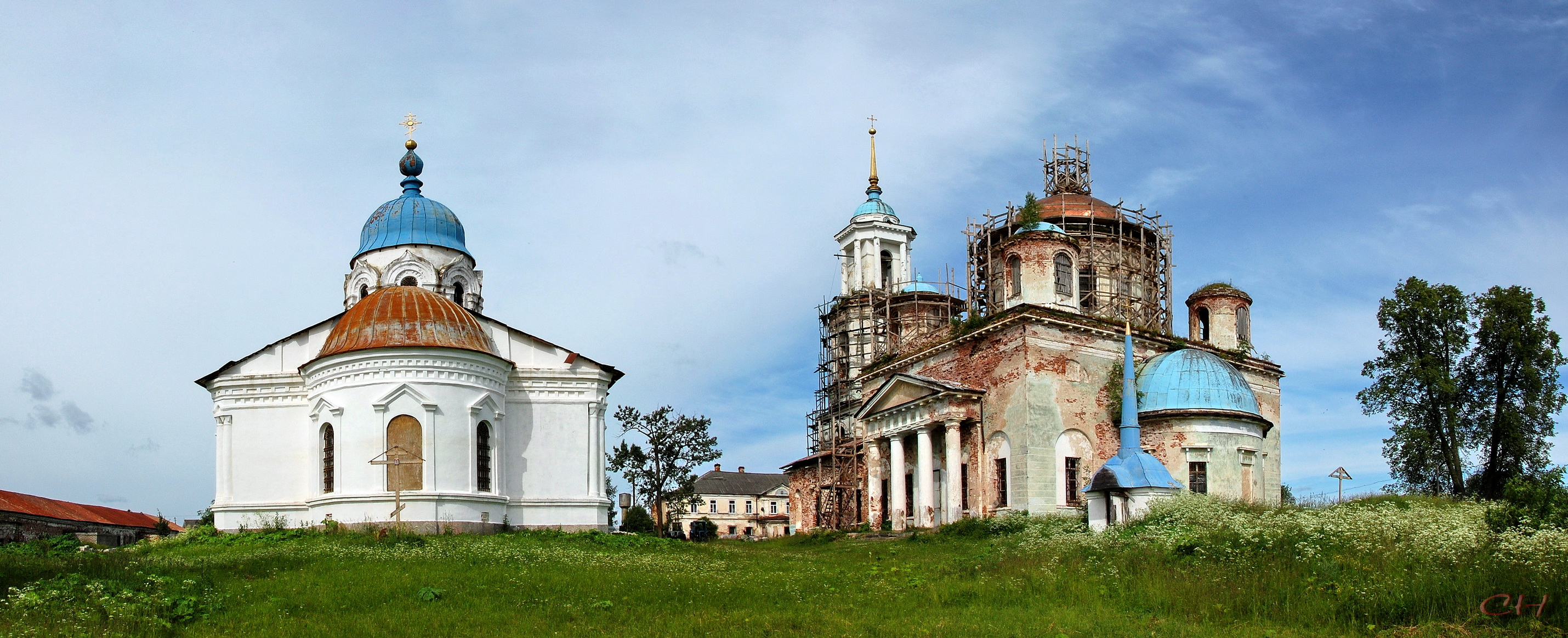
Overview

In 1492, the landowner Mikhail Obudkov built a wooden church in the village of Terebeni in honor of Saint Nicholas the Wonderworker. According to legend, the image of St. Nicholas, kept in it, repeatedly left the church by itself transporting to the spring on the banks of the Mologa River. At this place, a wooden church was erected, around which the pustyn was subsequently formed.

In the 16th century, the village belonged to Vladimir the Bold, prince of Serpukhov. Information has been preserved that by the Time of Troubles the monastery already existed, but it was ravaged by the Poles and completely destroyed. The site remained empty until in 1611 a monk named Onuphrius dug a cave with the help of the landowner Artemy Mozovsky. However, Onuphrius later left this place.

In 1641, the hieromonk Abraham from Zaonezhye, who was helped by the same Artemy Mozovsky, built a chapel on the site of the burnt church. During its construction, the icon of St. Nicholas was discovered intact, in whose honor the original church was built in 1492. This prompted the two to build a temple instead of a chapel, and settle on the site when the icon was founded. Later hieromonk Theodosius, the former serf of duke Fyodor Meshchersky, joined Abraham and Artemy. A new wooden Annunciation church was built, consecrated with the blessing of the Metropolitan Aphthonius of Novgorod, since the former one ceased to accommodate numerous parishioners and pilgrims. In 1657, under Abbot Nathanael, wooden churches were replaced by stone ones: St. Nicholas' with the Annunciation chapel, and in honor of Alexander of Svir. Both of them were subsequently disassembled and replaced with new ones.

By 1860 the monastery was surrounded by a 260 sazhens-long wall with towers. By 1908 there was a shelter for the poor and elderly clergy. Until 1917, the monastery owned 1350 hectares of land, about 40 inhabitants lived in it.

== Icons ==
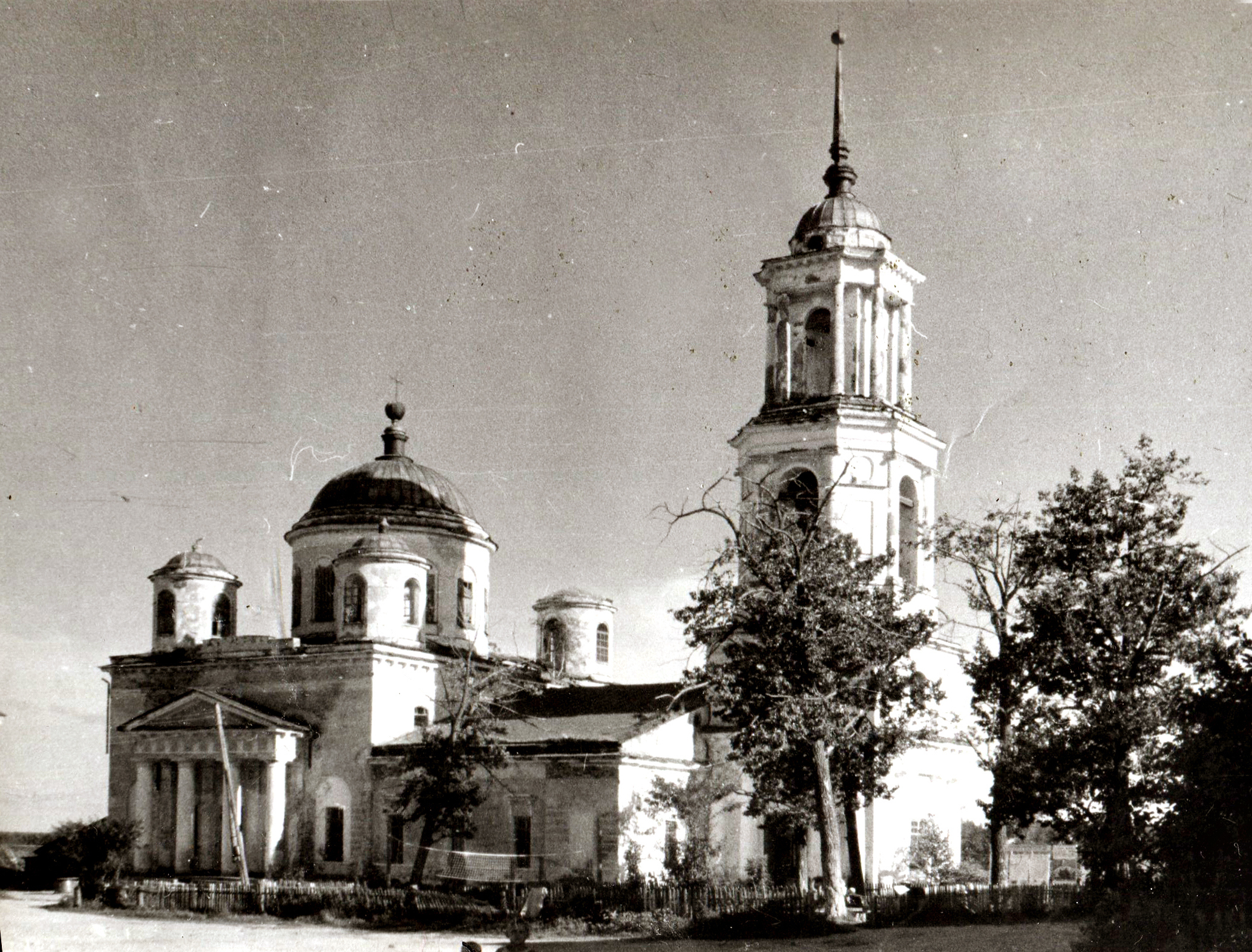
Saint Nicholas church in 1972

There were two miraculous icons: St. Nicholas and the Theotokos of Terebeni. A feast day of the latter was held annually on May 14 (O.S. April 22). The icon was lost during the devastation of the monastery and the fires, and, possibly, later ended up in the sacristy of the Saint Sophia Cathedral in Veliky Novgorod. The copy has been in the monastery since 1855. During the Soviet era, the icons were preserved, despite the closure of the monastery.

== Modern history ==
After the closure of the monastery by the Soviet government, St. Nicholas church survived, as it was used by the local sovkhoz first as a storage of fertilizers, and later as a gym. The village of Terebeni was renamed Truzhenik (Russian: Труженик, "Hardworker") after the sovkhoz. Since the mid-1990s, it has been revived as a nunnery. In 2004, this change received the official status and nun Olga (Nazmutdinova) was appointed abbess. On 20 November 2020, by the decision of the Holy Synod, the monastery was transformed into a male one and Theodore (Zelenov) became its abbot. At present, churches of Saint Nicholas and Annunciation are to be reconstructed, as well as the chapel of St. Alexander Svirsky, the rector's and fraternal buildings and the wall.
