= Brusovo, Tver Oblast =

Rural locality in Udomelsky District, Tver Oblast, Russia

Coordinates: 57°51′25″N 35°24′05″E

Brusovo (Russian: Бру́сово) is a settlement in Udomelsky District of Tver Oblast, Russia.

On June 1, 1936 Brusovsky District with the administrative center in Brusovo was established as a part of Kalinin Oblast. On November 14, 1960 it was abolished and split between Maksatikhinsky and Udomelsky Districts. Brusovo was transferred to Udomelsky District.
