= Pavel Kosolapov =

Russian Islamist (born 1980)

Pavel Pavlovich Kosolapov (Russian: Павел Павлович Косолапов; born February 27 1980, in Serafimovichsky District, Volgograd Oblast, Russia) is an ethnic Russian who is alleged to be an islamic terrorist and sometimes referenced as "Russian Bin Laden". According to Russian intelligence services, he was the lead organizer of the February 2004 Moscow Metro bombing, 2007 Nevsky Express bombing and many smaller terrorist acts in Samara, Voronesh and Moscow Oblast. According to some versions he is also responsible for the 2009 Nevsky Express bombing.
