= Rameshki, Nikolsky District, Vologda Oblast =

Rameshki Рамешки
- Village
- Location within Vologda Oblast Location within Russia
- Coordinates: 59°26′N 45°19′E
- Country: Russia
- Region: Vologda Oblast
- District: Nikolsky District
- Time zone: UTC+3:00

Rameshki (Russian: Рамешки) is a rural locality (a village) in Krasnopolyanskoye Rural Settlement, Nikolsky District, Vologda Oblast, Russia. The population was 67 as of 2002. There are 3 streets.

== Geography ==
Rameshki is located 18 km southwest of Nikolsk (the district's administrative centre) by road. Osinovo is the nearest rural locality.
