= Likhoslavl =

Town in Tver Oblast, Russia

Likhoslavl Лихославль
- Town
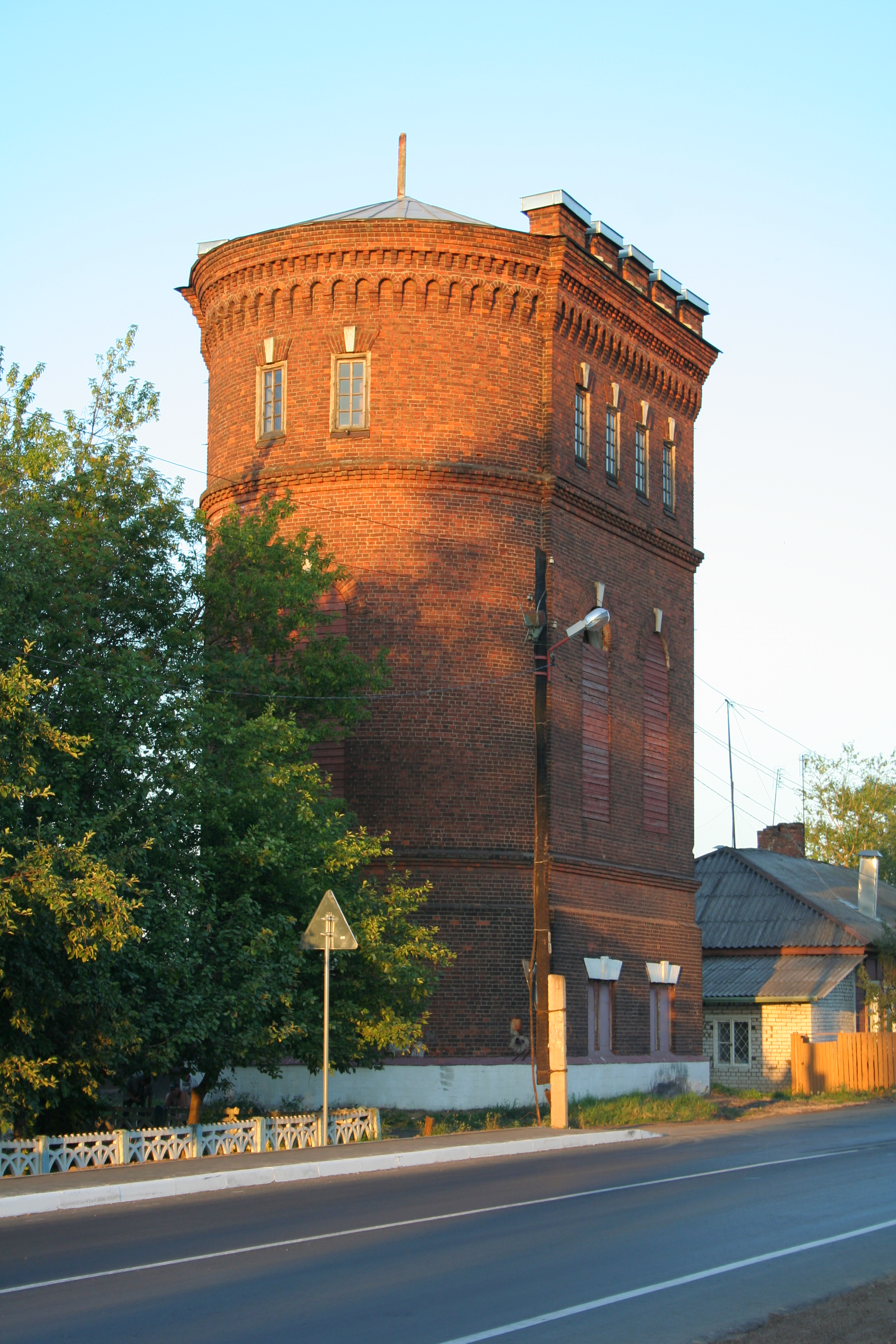
- Water tower at the Likhoslavl railway station

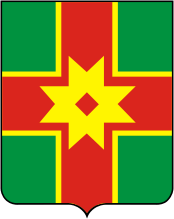
- Flag Coat of arms
- Interactive map of Likhoslavl
- Location of Likhoslavl Likhoslavl (Tver Oblast)
- Coordinates: 57°08′N 35°29′E
- Country: Russia
- Federal subject: Tver Oblast
- Administrative district: Likhoslavlsky District
- Urban settlementSelsoviet: Likhoslavl
- Founded: 1624
- Town status since: 1925
- Elevation: 170 m (560 ft)

Population (2010 Census)
  - Total: 12,257
  - Estimate (2021): 11,017 (−10.1%)

Administrative status
  - Capital of: Likhoslavlsky District, Likhoslavl Urban Settlement

Municipal status
  - Municipal district: Likhoslavlsky Municipal District
  - Urban settlement: Likhoslavl Urban Settlement
  - Capital of: Likhoslavlsky Municipal District, Likhoslavl Urban Settlement
- Time zone: UTC+3 (MSK)
- Postal codes: 171210, 171239
- OKTMO ID: 28638101001
- Website: admlihoslavl.ru

Likhoslavl (Russian: Лихосла́вль) is a town and the administrative center of Likhoslavlsky District in Tver Oblast, Russia, located on the Moscow–St. Petersburg Railway, 41 kilometers (25 mi) northwest of Tver, the administrative center of the oblast. Population: 12,257 (2010 census); 12,515 (2002 census); 13,449 (1989 Soviet census).

== History ==
Likhoslavl developed on the spot where localities of Ostashkovo (Осташково, founded in 1624) and Likhoslavl (first mentioned in the early 19th century) once stood. Likhoslavl grew up as a settlement serving the railway station. It was a part of Novotorzhsky Uyezd of Tver Governorate. It was granted town status in 1925.

On July 12, 1929, the governorates and uyezds were abolished. Likhoslavlsky District, with the administrative center in Likhoslavl, was established within Tver Okrug of Moscow Oblast. On July 23, 1930, the okrugs were abolished and the districts were directly subordinated to the oblast. On January 29, 1935, Likhoslavlsky District was transferred to newly established Kalinin Oblast. On July 9, 1937, Likhoslavlsky District was included into Karelian National Okrug, which was established as a Tver Karelians autonomy, and became its administrative center. On February 7, 1939, the okrug was abolished. In February , 1963, during the abortive administrative reform by Nikita Khrushchev, Likhoslavlsky District was merged into Torzhoksky District, but on March 4, 1964 it was re-established. In 1990, Kalinin Oblast was renamed Tver Oblast.

== Administrative and municipal status ==
Within the framework of administrative divisions, Likhoslavl serves as the administrative center of Likhoslavlsky District. As an administrative division, it is, together with three rural localities, incorporated within Likhoslavlsky District as Likhoslavl Urban Settlement. As a municipal division, this administrative unit also has urban settlement status and is a part of Likhoslavlsky Municipal District.

== Economy ==
=== Industry ===
There are enterprises of electrotechnical, ceramic, and food industries in Likhoslavl.

=== Transportation ===
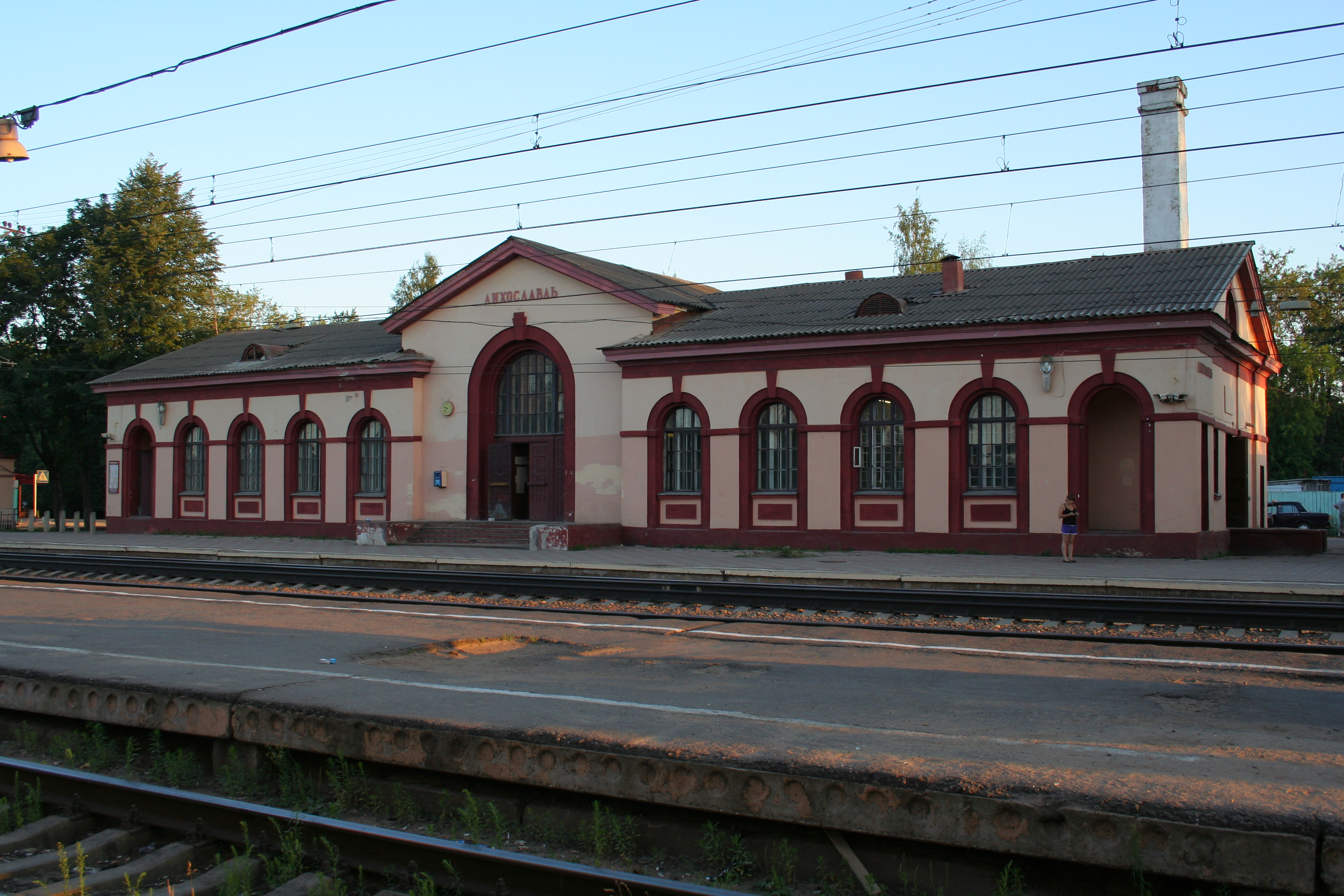
Likhoslavl railway station

Likhoslavl has a railway station on the railway connecting Moscow and St. Petersburg. Another railway branches west and heads to Torzhok and further to Ostashkov and Rzhev.

The town is connected by road with Torzhok, where it has access to the M10 Highway connecting Moscow and St. Petersburg. Likhoslavl is also connected by road with Mednoye, where it has another access to M10.

== Culture and recreation ==
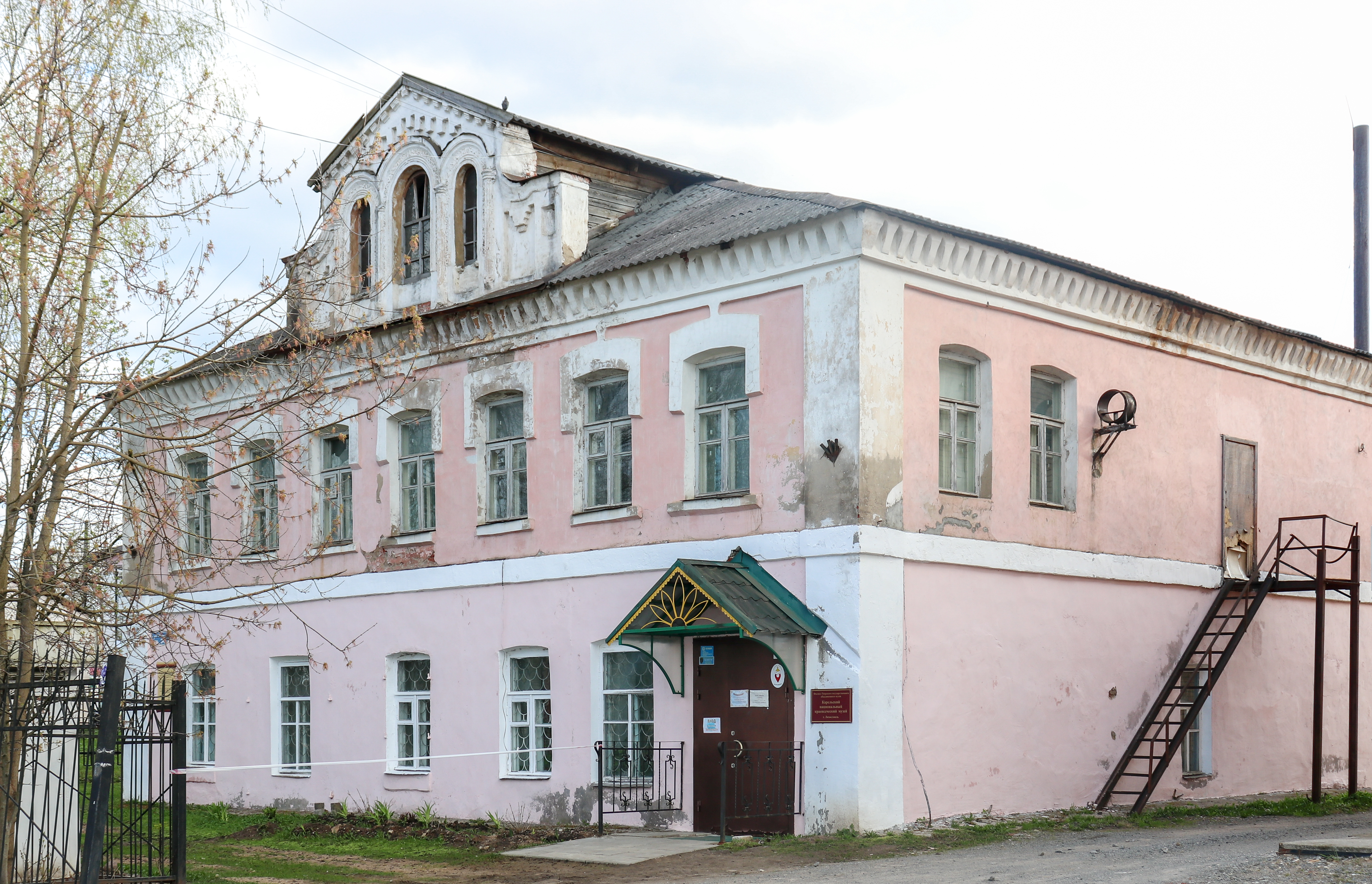
Karelian National Museum in Likhoslavl

Likhoslavl contains seven objects classified as cultural and historical heritage of local significance. All of these are related to the events of World War II, and even though the town was not occupied by German forces, Likhoslavsky District was close to the front line.

Likhoslavlsky District is one of four districts of Tver Oblast with a significant number of Tver Karelians. In Likhoslavl, there is a local museum mostly devoted to Tver Karelian culture and ethnography.

== Notable people ==
Actress Olesya Rulin is from Likhoslavl.
