= Spirovo, Cherepovetsky District, Vologda Oblast =

Spirovo Спирово
- Village
- Location within Vologda Oblast Location within Russia
- Coordinates: 59°02′N 37°24′E
- Country: Russia
- Region: Vologda Oblast
- District: Cherepovetsky District
- Time zone: UTC+3:00

Spirovo (Russian: Спирово) is a village (rural locality) in Korotovskoye Rural Settlement, Cherepovetsky District, Vologda Oblast, Russia. The population was 17 as of 2002.

== Geography ==
Spirovo is located 53 km southwest of Cherepovets (the district's administrative centre) by road. Pesye is the nearest rural locality.
