= Spirovskaya =

Spirovskaya Спировская
- Village
- Location within Vologda Oblast Location within Russia
- Coordinates: 60°06′N 45°16′E
- Country: Russia
- Region: Vologda Oblast
- District: Kichmengsko-Gorodetsky District
- Time zone: UTC+3:00

Spirovskaya (Russian: Спировская) is a rural locality (a village) in Gorodetskoye Rural Settlement, Kichmengsko-Gorodetsky District, Vologda Oblast, Russia. The population was 21 as of 2002.

== Geography ==
Spirovskaya is located 40 km northwest of Kichmengsky Gorodok (the district's administrative centre) by road. Pavlovo is the nearest rural locality.
