= Maksatikhinsky District =

Maksatikhinsky District Максатихинский район (Russian)
- District
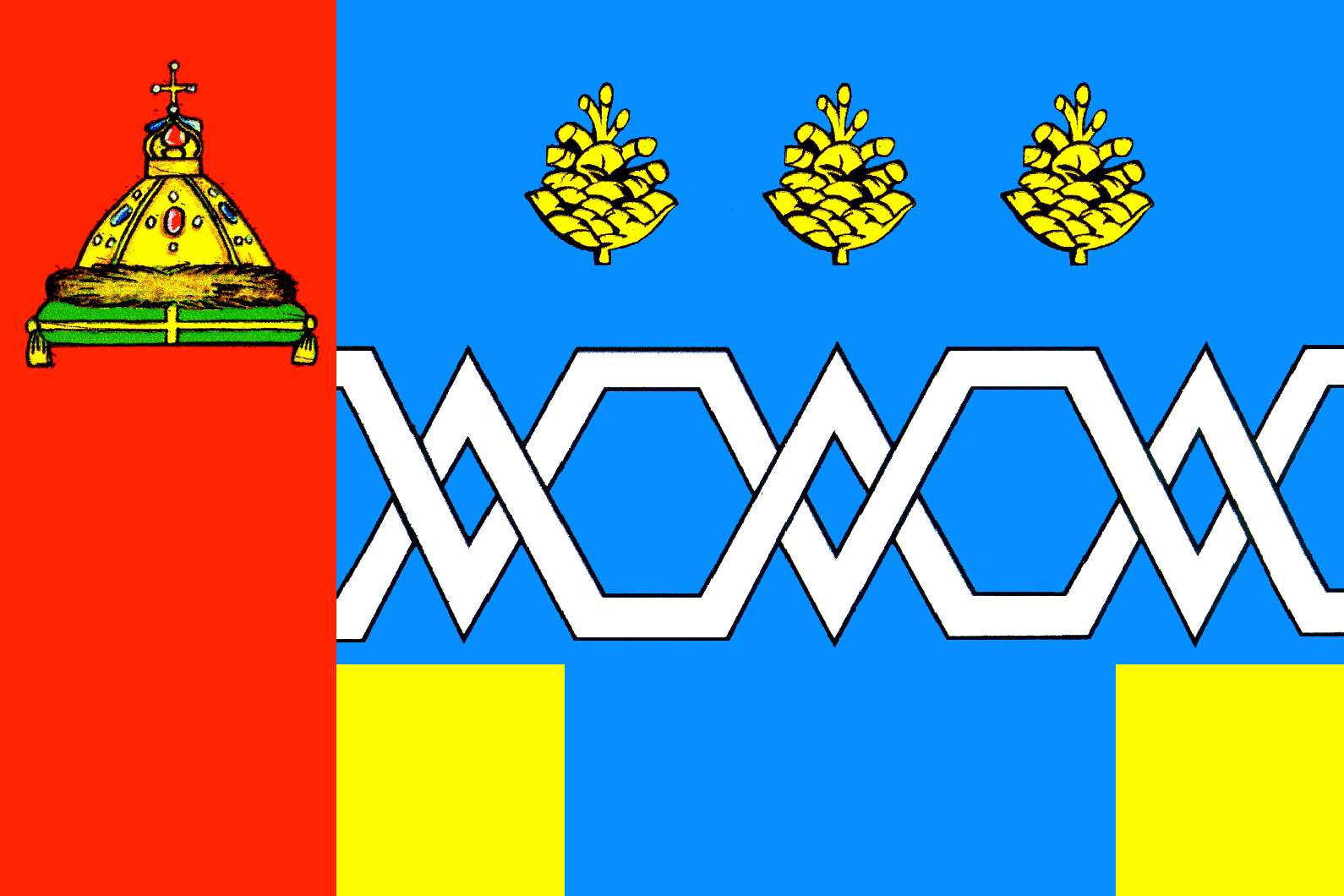
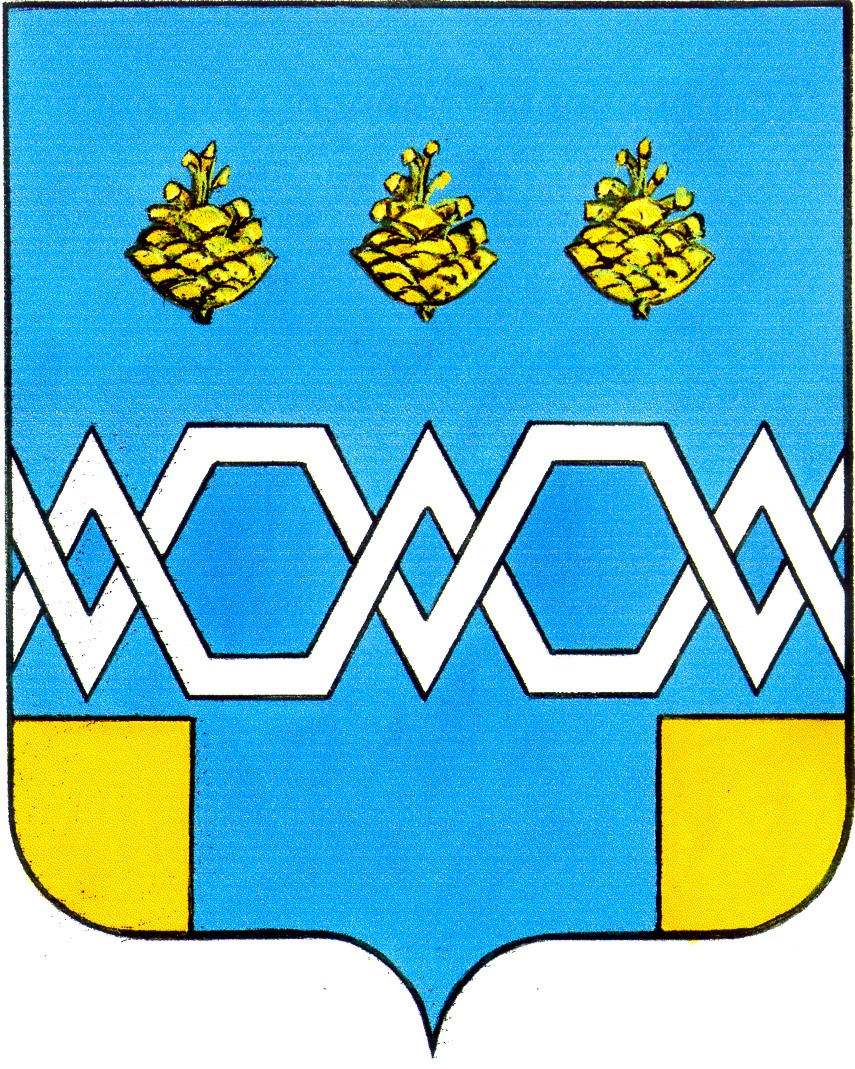
- Flag Coat of arms
- Location of Maksatikhinsky District in Tver Oblast
- Coordinates: 57°47′48″N 35°53′04″E
- Country: Russia
- Federal subject: Tver Oblast
- Established: 12 July 1929
- Administrative center: Maksatikha

Area
  - Total: 2,766 km^{2} (1,068 sq mi)

Population (2010 Census)
  - Total: 16,723
  - Density: 6.046/km^{2} (15.66/sq mi)
  - Urban: 52.3%
  - Rural: 47.7%

Administrative structure
  - Administrative divisions: 1 Urban settlements, 3 Rural settlements
  - Inhabited localities: 1 urban-type settlements, 292 rural localities

Municipal structure
  - Municipally incorporated as: Maksatikhinsky Municipal District
  - Municipal divisions: 1 urban settlements, 3 rural settlements
- Time zone: UTC+3 (MSK)
- OKTMO ID: 28640000
- Website: http://maksatiha.org/

Maksatikhinsky District (Russian: Макса́тихинский райо́н) is an administrative and municipal district (raion), one of the thirty-six in Tver Oblast, Russia. It is located in the northeast of the oblast and borders with Lesnoy District in the north, Sandovsky and Molokovsky Districts in the northeast, Bezhetsky District in the east, Rameshkovsky and Likhoslavlsky Districts in the south, Spirovsky and Vyshnevolotsky Districts in the southwest, and with Udomelsky District in the west. The area of the district is 2,766 square kilometers (1,068 sq mi). Its administrative center is the urban locality (an urban-type settlement) of Maksatikha. Population: 16,723 (2010 Census); 20,644 (2002 census); 24,414 (1989 Soviet census). The population of Maksatikha accounts for 52.3% of the district's total population.

== Geography ==
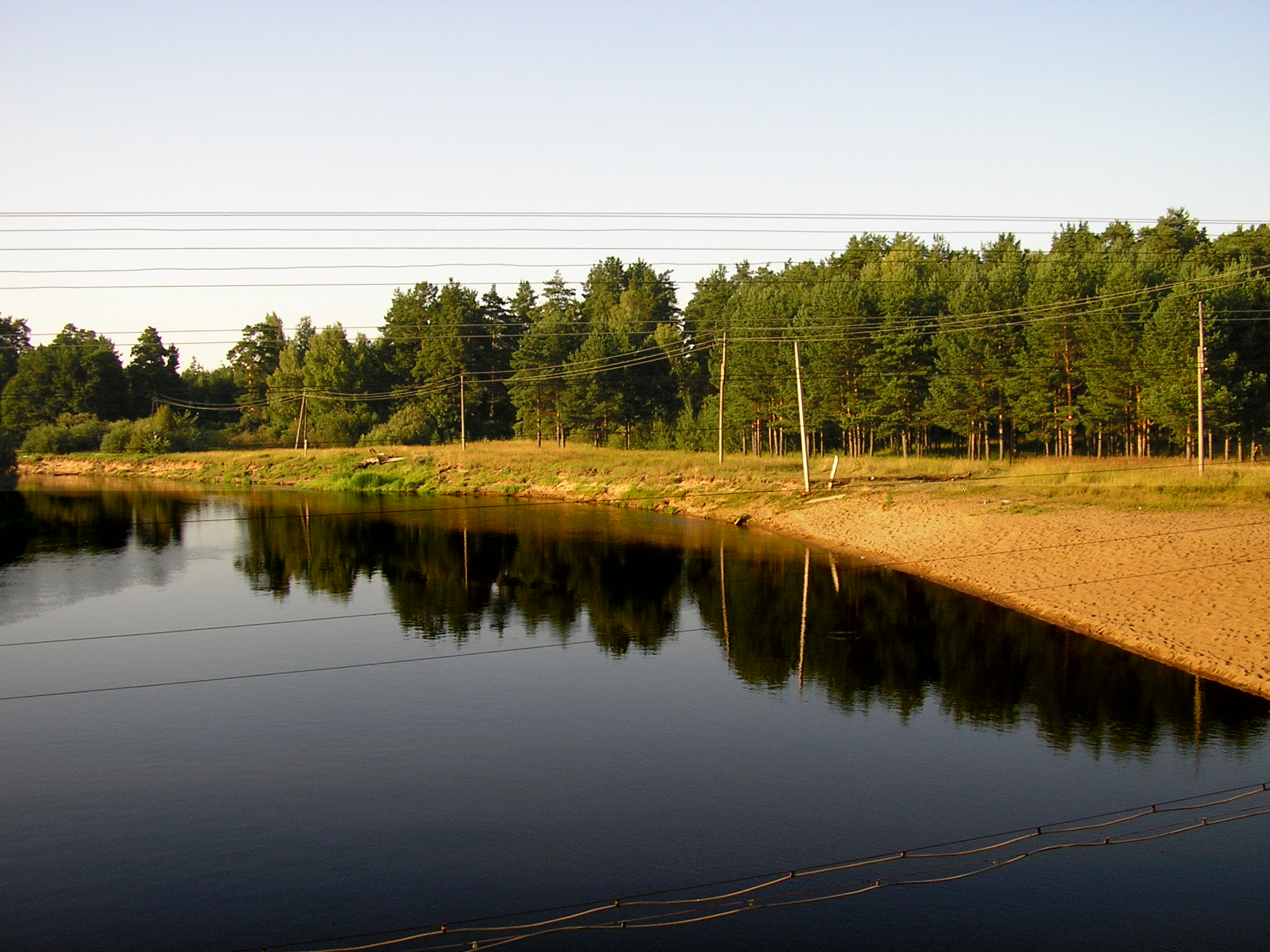
The Volchina River at Maksatikha

The whole area of the district belongs to the drainage basin of the Mologa River, a major tributary of the Rybinsk Reservoir. The source of the Mologa is in the southeastern part of the district. The river flows east, exits the district, and re-enters it again in the central and northern part. In particular, the settlement of Maksatikha is located on the banks of the Mologa. The major tributary of the Mologa within the district is the Volchina River (left).

== History ==
Since the Middle Ages, the area was on the eastern border of Novgorod Lands. In the 15th century, together with Novgorod, it was transferred to the Grand Duchy of Moscow.

In the course of the administrative reform carried out in 1708 by Peter the Great, the area was included into Saint Petersburg Governorate (before 1710, Ingermanland Governorate). In 1727, Novgorod Governorate was split off, and the western part of the current area of the district was transferred to Novgorod Governorate. At the same time, the eastern part was transferred to Moscow Governorate. In 1775, Tver Viceroyalty was formed from the lands which previously belonged to Moscow and Novgorod Governorates. The whole area of the current district was transferred to Tver Viceroyalty. In 1796, Tver Viceroyalty was transformed into Tver Governorate. The area was split between Bezhetsky and Vyshnevolotsky Uyezds.

On July 12, 1929 the governorates and uyezds were abolished. Maksatikhinsky District, with the administrative center in the settlement of Maksatikha, was established within Bezhetsk Okrug of Moscow Oblast. On July 23, 1930, the okrugs were abolished, and the districts were directly subordinated to the oblast. On January 29, 1935 Kalinin Oblast was established, and Maksatikhinsky District was transferred to Kalinin Oblast.

On July 9, 1937 Maksatikhinsky District was included into Karelian National Okrug, which was established as a Tver Karelians autonomy. On February 7, 1939 the okrug was abolished. In 1990, Kalinin Oblast was renamed Tver Oblast.

On June 1, 1936 Brusovsky District with the administrative center in the settlement of Brusovo was established as a part of Kalinin Oblast. On November 14, 1960, it was abolished and split between Maksatikhinsky and Udomelsky Districts.

On July 9, 1937, Kozlovsky District with the administrative center in the selo of Kozlovo was established as a part of Karelian National Okrug. On February 7, 1939 it was subordinated directly to Kalinin Oblast. On July 4, 1956 it was abolished and split between Maksatikhinsky and Spirovsky Districts.

== Economy ==
=== Industry ===
There are enterprises of timber and food industry in the district.

=== Agriculture ===
The main agricultural specializations of the district are cattle breeding with meat and milk production and vegetables farming.

=== Transportation ===
The railway connecting Rybinsk and Bologoye via Bezhetsk crosses the district from east to west. Maksatikha is the principal station within the district.

Maksatikha is connected by roads with Tver via Rameshki, with Bezhetsk, with Vyshny Volochyok, and with Lesnoye. There are also local roads with bus traffic originating from Maksatikha.

== Culture and recreation ==
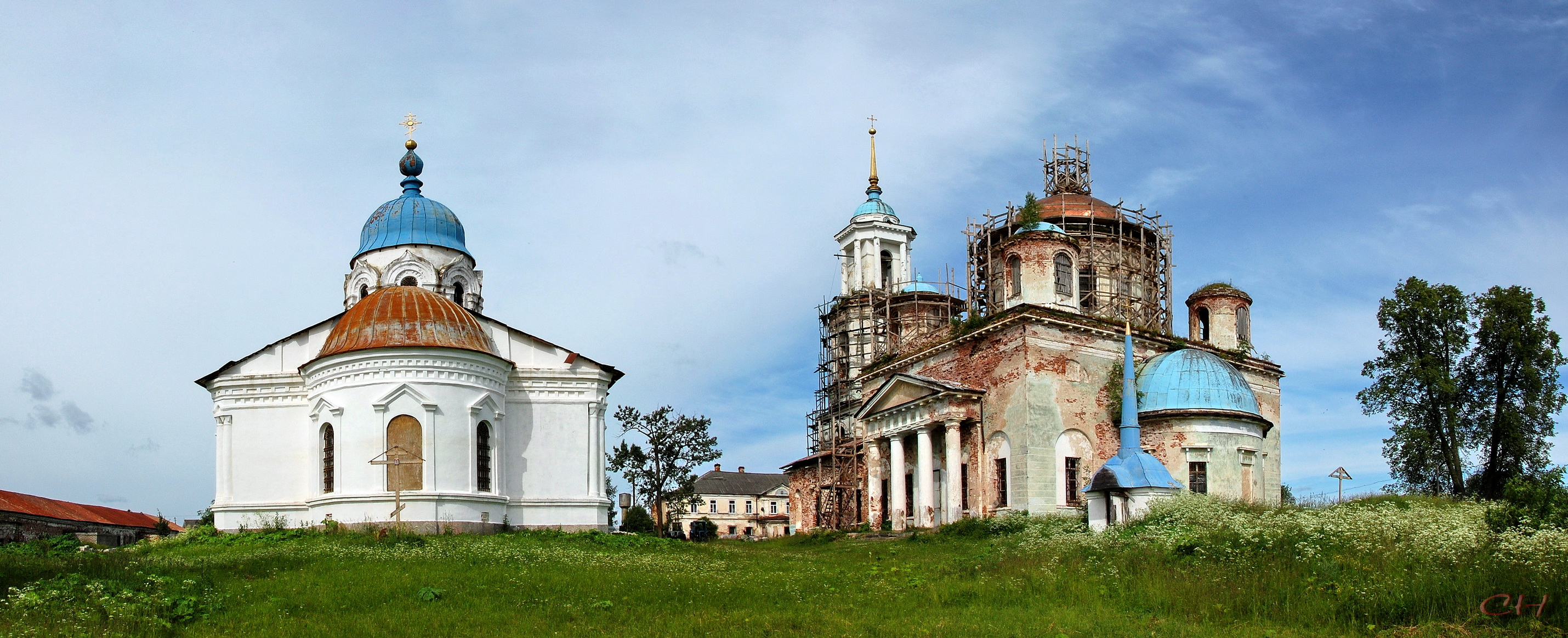
The Nikolo-Terebensky Monastery

The district contains seventeen cultural heritage monuments of federal significance and additionally twenty-five objects classified as cultural and historical heritage of local significance. The federal monuments include the complex of the Nikolo-Terebensky Monastery in the settlement of Truzhenik, the Dormition Church in the selo of Dobryni, built in the middle of the 18th century, as well as a number of archeological sites.

Maksatikhnsky District is one of four districts of Tver Oblast with a significant number of Tver Karelians.
