= Spirovsky District =

Spirovsky District Спировский район (Russian)
- District
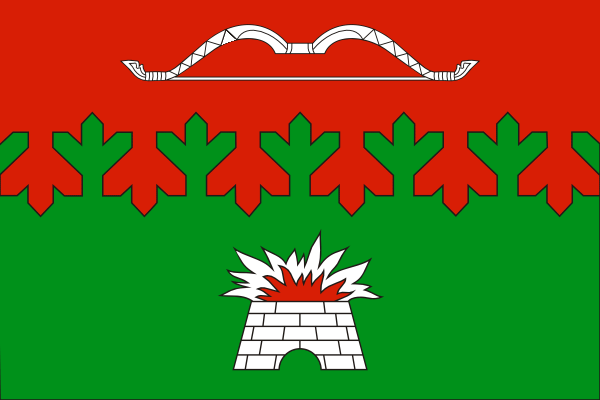
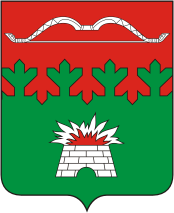
- Flag Coat of arms
- Location of Spirovsky District in Tver Oblast
- Coordinates: 57°25′08″N 34°59′27″E
- Country: Russia
- Federal subject: Tver Oblast
- Established: 1929
- Administrative center: Spirovo

Area
  - Total: 1,498 km^{2} (578 sq mi)

Population (2010 Census)
  - Total: 12,203
  - Density: 8.146/km^{2} (21.10/sq mi)
  - Urban: 51.4%
  - Rural: 48.6%

Administrative structure
  - Administrative divisions: 1 Urban settlements, 4 Rural settlements
  - Inhabited localities: 1 urban-type settlements, 140 rural localities

Municipal structure
  - Municipally incorporated as: Spirovsky Municipal District
  - Municipal divisions: 1 urban settlements, 4 rural settlements
- Time zone: UTC+3 (MSK)
- OKTMO ID: 28552000
- Website: http://spirovoraion.ru/

Spirovsky District (Russian: Спи́ровский райо́н) is an administrative and municipal district (raion), one of the thirty-six in Tver Oblast, Russia. It is located in the center of the oblast and borders with Maksatikhinsky District in the north, Likhoslavlsky District in the east, Torzhoksky District in the south, and with Vyshnevolotsky District in the west. The area of the district is 1,498 square kilometers (578 sq mi). Its administrative center is the urban locality (an urban-type settlement) of Spirovo. Population: 12,203 (2010 Census); 13,805 (2002 census); 15,412 (1989 Soviet census). The population of Spirovo accounts for 51.4% of the district's total population.

== Geography ==
The area of the district is elongated from southwest to northeast. The whole area belongs to the river basin of the Volga River and is split between three of its major tributaries. The rivers in the northeastern part of the district drain into the Tifina, in the basin of the Mologa River. The central part of the district belongs to the drainage basin of the Medveditsa River. The southwestern part of the district belongs to the basin of the Tvertsa River. Both the Tvertsa and the Tifina cross the district, whereas the source of the Medveditsa is located in the district.

== History ==
Vydropuzhsk, one of the oldest settlement in the district, was first mentioned in 1545. In the course of the administrative reform carried out in 1708 by Peter the Great, the area was included into Ingermanlandia Governorate (since 1710 known as Saint Petersburg Governorate), and in 1727 Novgorod Governorate split off. On April 2, 1772 Vyshnevolotsky Uyezd of Novgorod Governorate was established, with the seat in Vyshny Volochyok. In 1775, Tver Viceroyalty was formed from the lands which previously belonged to Moscow and Novgorod Governorates, and the area was transferred to Tver Viceroyalty, which in 1796 was transformed to Tver Governorate. The area was split between Vyshnevolotsky and Novotorzhsky Uyezds. In particular, Vydropuzhsk belonged to Novotorzhsky Uyezd, whereas Spirovo, which was founded in 1847, belonged to Vyshnevolotsky Uyezd.

On July 12, 1929 the governorates and uyezds were abolished. Spirovsky District, with the administrative center in Spirovo, was established within Tver Okrug of Moscow Oblast. On July 23, 1930, the okrugs were abolished, and the districts were directly subordinated to the oblast. On January 29, 1935 Kalinin Oblast was established, and Spirovsky District was transferred to Kalinin Oblast. In February 1963, during the abortive administrative reform by Nikita Khrushchev, Spirovsky District was merged into Vyshnevolotsky District, but on January 12, 1965 it was re-established. During this period, Spirovo was administratively a part of the town of Vyshny Volochyok. In 1990, Kalinin Oblast was renamed Tver Oblast.

Another district created on July 12, 1929 was Tolmachyovsky District with the administrative center in the selo of Tolmachi. It was a part of Tver Okrug of Moscow Oblast. On January 29, 1935 the district was transferred to Tver Oblast, and on March 5, 1935 it was renamed Novokarelsky District. On July 9, 1937 it was transferred to Karelian National Okrug, a Tver Karelians autonomy. On February 7, 1939 the okrug was abolished, and the district was subordinated directly to Kalinin Oblast. On July 4, 1956 it was abolished and split between Spirovsky and Likhoslavlsky Districts.

On July 9, 1937 Kozlovsky District with the administrative center in the selo of Kozlovo was established as a part of Karelian National Okrug. On February 7, 1939 it was subordinated directly to Kalinin Oblast. On July 4, 1956 it was abolished and split between Maksatikhinsky and Spirovsky Districts.

== Economy ==
=== Industry ===
Glassmaking industry accounts for 81% of the GDP of all industry of the district. The first glass-making factory was built in Spirovo in 1886 by merchant Kruglov and is still in operation. There are also enterprises of food industry.

=== Agriculture ===
The main agricultural specialization of the district is cattle breeding with meat and milk production.

=== Transportation ===
The Moscow – Saint Petersburg Railway crosses the district from the southeast to the northwest. The most significant station in the district is Spirovo.

The M10 highway, which connects Moscow and St. Petersburg, crosses the western part of the district. Spirovo has access to M10. There are local roads as well, with the bus traffic originating from Spirovo.

== Culture and recreation ==
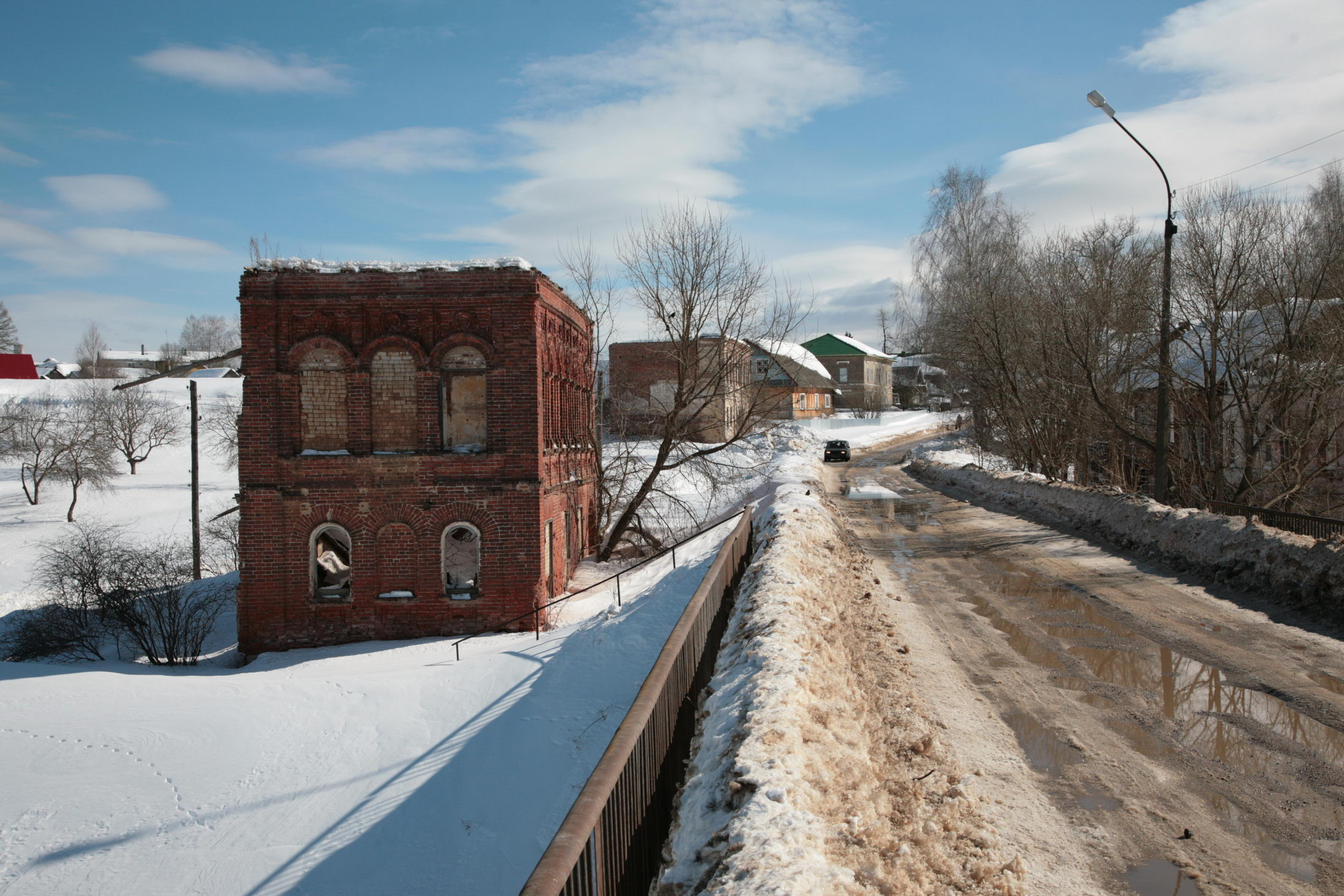
Former Church of the Virgin of Smolensk, Vydropuzhsk

The district contains eight cultural heritage monuments of federal significance and additionally forty-three objects classified as cultural and historical heritage of local significance. The federal monuments are buildings that remain of the Staraya Dubrovka Estate in the village of Dubrovka. Some of the buildings of Staraya Dubrovka were designed by architect Nikolay Lvov.

There is a local museum, located in Spirovo.

Spirovsky District is one of four districts of Tver Oblast with a significant number of Tver Karelians.
