= Rameshkovsky District =

Rameshkovsky District Рамешковский район (Russian)
- District
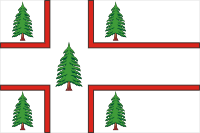
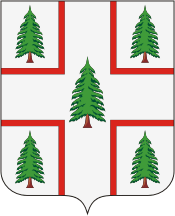
- Flag Coat of arms
- Location of Rameshkovsky District in Tver Oblast
- Coordinates: 57°20′41″N 36°02′37″E
- Country: Russia
- Federal subject: Tver Oblast
- Established: 1929
- Administrative center: Rameshki

Area
  - Total: 2,511 km^{2} (970 sq mi)

Population (2010 Census)
  - Total: 14,988
  - Density: 5.969/km^{2} (15.46/sq mi)
  - Urban: 28.8%
  - Rural: 71.2%

Administrative structure
  - Administrative divisions: 1 Urban settlements, 10 Rural settlements
  - Inhabited localities: 1 urban-type settlements, 305 rural localities

Municipal structure
  - Municipally incorporated as: Rameshkovsky Municipal District
  - Municipal divisions: 1 urban settlements, 10 rural settlements
- Time zone: UTC+3 (MSK)
- OKTMO ID: 28547000
- Website: http://www.rameshki.ru/

Rameshkovsky District (Russian: Ра́мешковский райо́н) is an administrative and municipal district (raion), one of the thirty-six in Tver Oblast, Russia. It is located in the eastern central part of the oblast and borders with Maksatikhinsky District in the north, Bezhetsky District in the northwest, Kashinsky District in the east, Kimrsky District in the southeast, Kalininsky District in the south, and with Likhoslavlsky District in the west. The area of the district is 2,511 square kilometers (970 sq mi). Its administrative center is the urban locality (an urban-type settlement) of Rameshki. Population: 14,988 (2010 Census); 15,600 (2002 census); 18,029 (1989 Soviet census). The population of Rameshki accounts for 28.8% of the district's total population.

== Geography ==
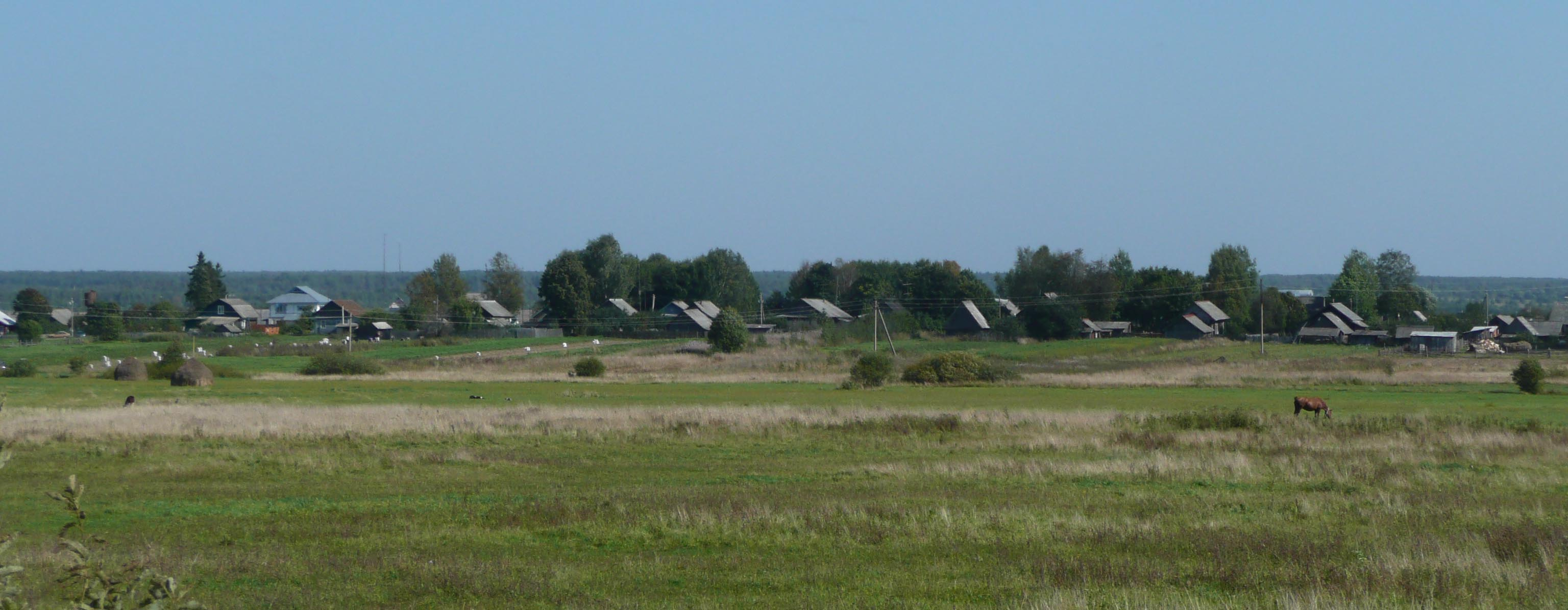
The village of Alyoshino

Almost all of the area of the district belongs to the drainage basin of the Medveditsa River, a left tributary of the Volga River. The Medveditsa crosses the district from west to east. The major tributaries of the Medveditsa inside the district are the Kushalka River and the Ivitsa River. Minor areas in the north of the district belong to the drainage basin of the Mologa River, another major left tributary of the Volga. Rivers in some areas in the south of the district drain into the Soz River, yet another left tributary of the Volga. In this area, known as Orshinsky Mokh, there are also many lakes and swamps, and peat production is active.

== History ==
In the Middle Ages, the area was divided between Principality of Tver and the Novgorod Republic. Principality of Tver and the Bezhetsk Verkh, a part of the Novgorod Republic, were annexed by Moscow in the 14th century, and in the 15th century Novgorod followed, after which the north of the current area of the district was included into Bezhetsk Pyatina, one of the five pyatinas into which the Novgorod Lands were divided.

In the course of the administrative reform carried out in 1708 by Peter the Great, the area was included into Ingermanland Governorate (known since 1710 as Saint Petersburg Governorate), but in 1727 it was transferred to Moscow Governorate. In 1775, Tver Viceroyalty was formed from the lands which previously belonged to Moscow and Novgorod Governorates, and the whole area was transferred to Tver Viceroyalty, which in 1796 was transformed to Tver Governorate. The area was split between Tverskoy, Bezhetsky, and Korchevskoy Uyezds.

On July 12, 1929 the governorates and uyezds were abolished. Rameshkovsky District, with the administrative center in Rameshki, was established within Tver Okrug of Moscow Oblast. On July 23, 1930, the okrugs were abolished, and the districts were directly subordinated to the oblast. On January 29, 1935 Kalinin Oblast was established, and Rameshkovsky District was transferred to Kalinin Oblast. On July 9, 1937 Rameshkovsky District was included into Karelian National Okrug, which was established as a Tver Karelians autonomy. On February 7, 1939 the okrug was abolished. In 1990, Kalinin Oblast was renamed Tver Oblast.

On July 12, 1929 Goritsky District with the administrative center in the selo of Goritsy was created as well. It was a part of Kimry Okrug of Moscow Oblast. On July 1, 1936 it was transferred to Kalinin Oblast. On February 13, 1963 the district was abolished and merged into Rameshkovsky District.

On March 5, 1935 Kushalinsky District with the center in the selo of Kushalino was established. On July 4, 1956 it was abolished and split between Kalininsky, Goritsky, and Rameshkovsky Districts.

Another district created on March 5, 1935 was Tebleshsky District with the center in the selo of Kiverichi. On July 4, 1956 it was abolished and split between Goritsky and Bezhetsky Districts.

On September 8, 1937 Orshinsky District with the administrative center in the selo of Rozhdestveno was established in the area which previously belonged to Konakovsky and Zavidovsky Districts. On October 22, 1959 the district was abolished and split between Konakovsky, Kalininsky, and Goritsky Districts.

== Economy ==
=== Industry ===
As of 2011, there were twenty-four industrial enterprises in the district. Nine were in timber industry, and six more were in construction industry.

=== Agriculture ===
The main agricultural specializations of the district are cattle breeding with meat and milk production, as well as crops growing. There is no food industry infrastructure in the district, and the agricultural production is exported to Tver and to Moscow Oblast.

=== Transportation ===
A road connecting Tver with Vesyegonsk via Bezhetsk crosses the district from south to north. In Rameshki, another road branches off north to Maksatikha. In Kushalino, another road branches east and provides access to Kimry and Kashin. There are also local roads, with bus traffic originating from Rameshki.

== Culture and recreation ==
The district contains twenty-two cultural heritage monuments of federal significance (six of them located in Rameshki) and additionally forty-three objects classified as cultural and historical heritage of local significance. The federal monuments include the ensemble of churches of the 18th and the 19th century in Rameshki, the Mikhnevo Estate in the village of Novo-Mikhnevo, the Odigitria Church in Kushalino, the Presentation Church in the village of Diyevo, as well as a number of archeological sites.

Rameshkovsky District is one of the areas with significant Tver Karelian population.
