= Saint Petersburg–Moscow railway =

Russian railway line

Saint Petersburg–Moscow railway (Nikolaevskaya railway)

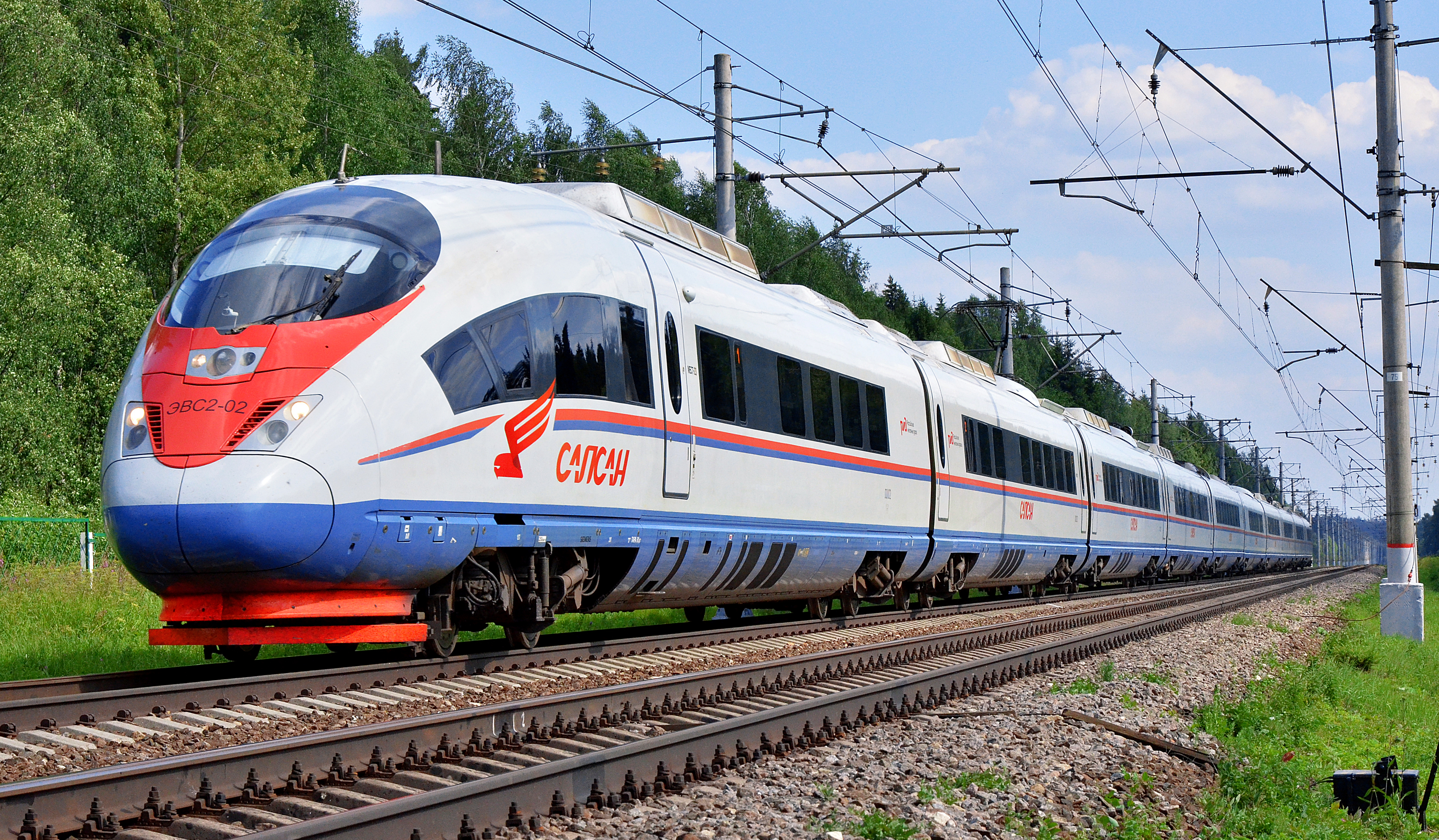
- The Sapsan high speed train on the way from Moscow to St. Petersburg.

Overview
- Status: Mostly passenger service
- Owner: Russian Railways
- Termini: Moscow (Leningradsky); Saint Petersburg (Moskovsky)

Service
- Type: High-speed rail Commuter rail Inter-city rail
- System: October Railway
- Operator: Russian Railways
- Rolling stock: Siemens Velaro RUS EVS; EP20; Siemens ES2G

History
- Opened: 1851

Technical
- Line length: 649.7 km (403.7 mi)
- Number of tracks: 4 (Moscow-Zelenograd) 2 (Zelenograd-Slavyanka) 3 (Slavyanka-St Petersburg)
- Character: Passenger and limited freight
- Track gauge: 1,520 mm (4 ft 11 27/32 in)
- Electrification: 3kV DC
- Operating speed: 250 km/h (155 mph)

The Saint Petersburg to Moscow railway (1855–1923 – Nikolaevskaya railway) runs for 649.7 kilometers (403.7 mi) through four oblasts: Leningrad, Novgorod, Tver and Moscow. It is a major traffic artery in the north-west region of Russia, operated by the October Railway subdivision of Russian Railways.

== History ==
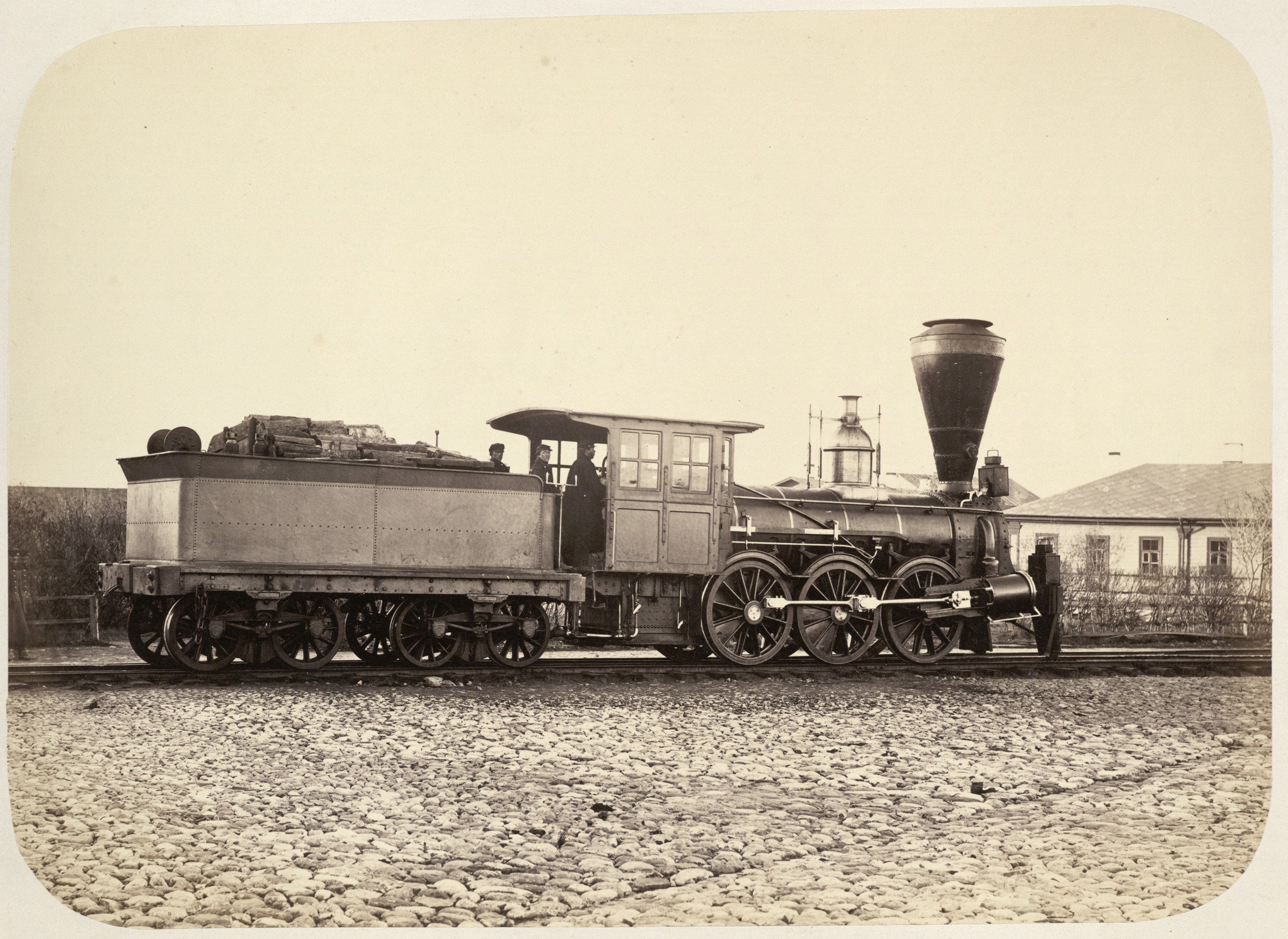
Wood-burning locomotive on the Nikolaev railway, c. 1858

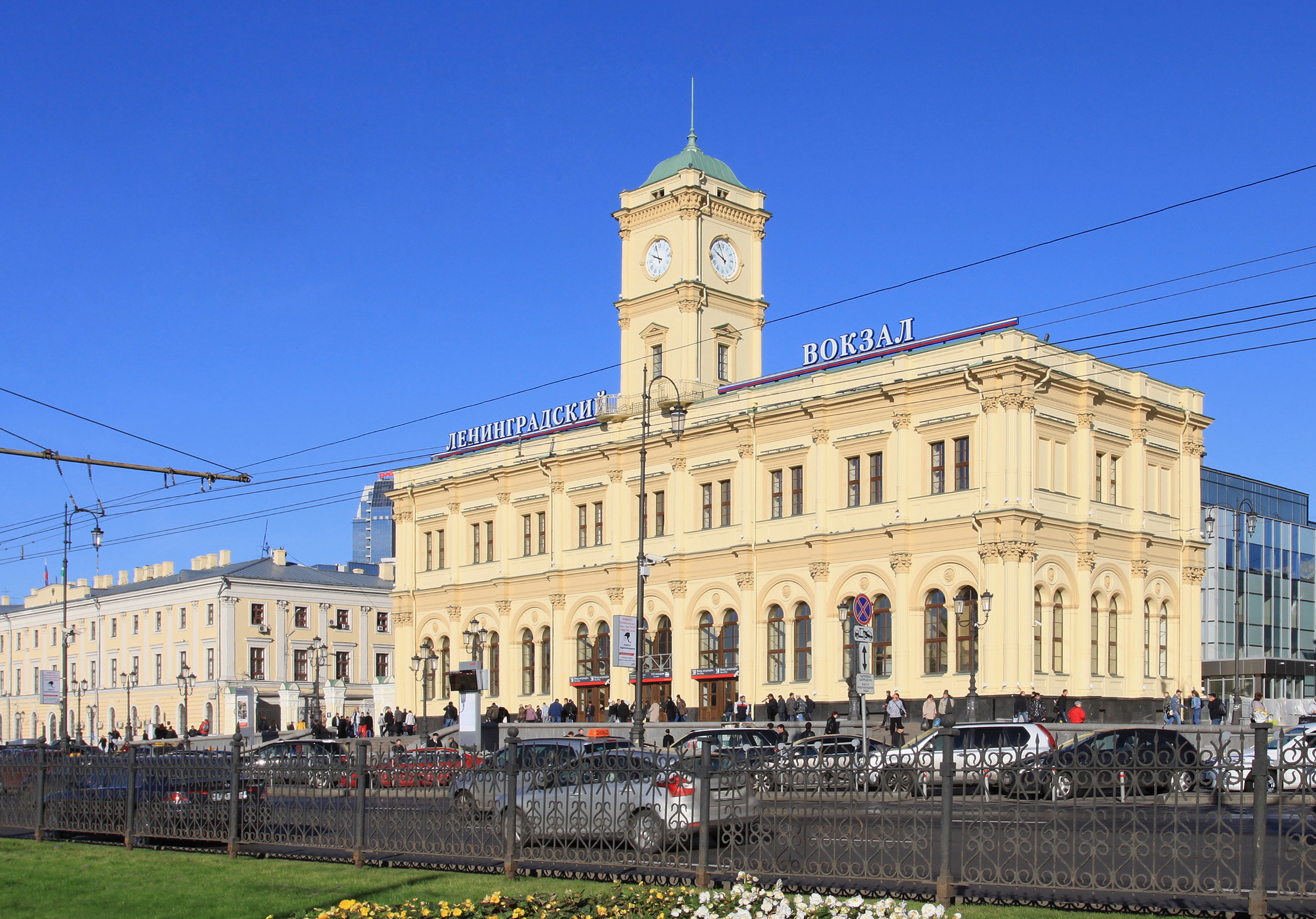
Leningradsky railway station (1851) in Moscow, the southern terminus of the line

=== Context ===
On 1 February 1842, Tsar Nicholas I issued a ukase ordering the railway's construction. The railway was a pet project of Pavel Melnikov (1804–1880), an engineer and administrator who supervised its construction and whose statue may be seen near the southern terminus, the Leningradsky railway station in Moscow. The idea of a railway connecting the two capitals gave rise to a prolonged controversy, with some reactionary officials predicting social upheaval if the masses were allowed to travel. It was decided that only the affluent would be allowed to use the line; every passenger was to be subjected to strict passport and police control.

Although the Tsarskoye Selo Railway, built by German engineer Franz Anton von Gerstner in 1837, was Russia's first public railway line, the cost overruns led Tsar Nicholas I and his advisors to doubt Gerstner's ability to execute the planned St. Petersburg–Moscow line. So Melnikov and another colleague traveled to the United States in 1839 to study railroad technology, where they met George Washington Whistler, who designed the Canton Viaduct for the Boston and Providence Railroad.

Upon Melnikov's recommendation, Tsar Nicholas I invited Whistler to help build the railway. Whistler left for Russia in June 1842, accompanied by imperial engineer Major Ivan F. Bouttatz, who would become Whistler's friend. He received the Order of Saint Anna by the Russian Emperor in 1847 but contracted cholera and died on 7 April 1849, in Saint Petersburg, Russia, two years before the line was completed.

It was built by serfs with heavy loss of life, a fact bemoaned by Nikolay Nekrasov in his 1864 poem The Railway. After ten years of construction, the line opened on 1 November 1851. The first passenger train left Saint Petersburg at 11:15 and arrived in Moscow at 21:00 the next day. When completed, the line was the longest double-track railway in the world.

=== The ruler legend ===
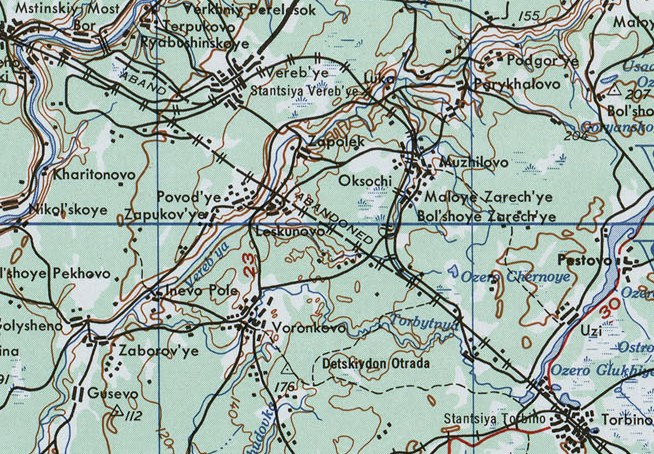
Map of Msta river area (1954)

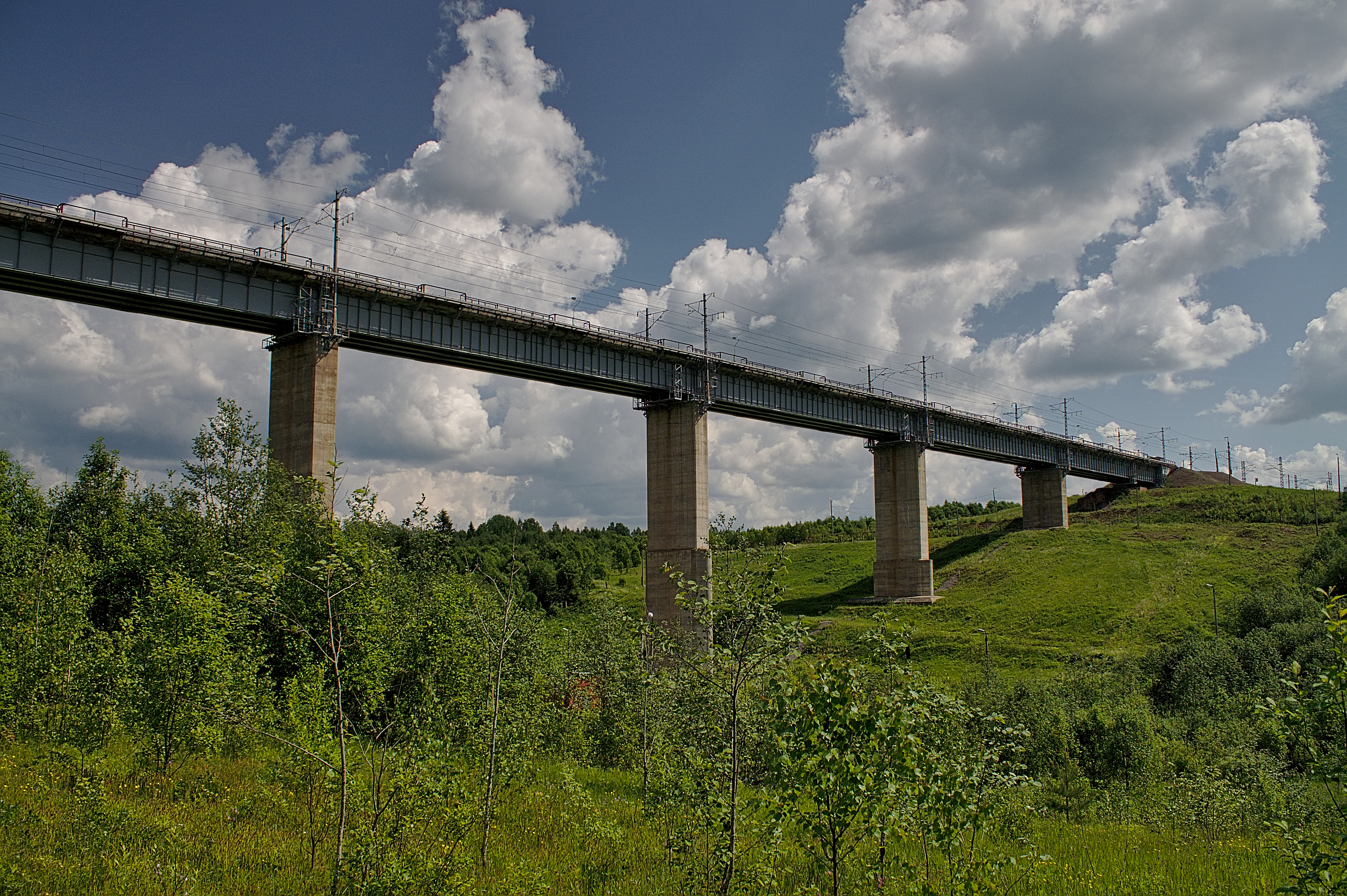
New Verebinsky Bridge, opened in 2001 to replace the bypass

Tsar Nicholas I figures in an urban legend about the railroad. When it was planned in 1842, he supposedly demanded the shortest path be used despite major obstacles in the way. The story says he tried to use a ruler to draw the railroad in a perfectly straight line. By the Msta River the tsar's pencil hit an awkwardly placed finger which he was using to hold down the ruler, creating a bend in the line. The legend says that the engineers wanted to execute the tsar's order exactly, and the result was a perfectly straight track apart from a single bend. The false story became popular in Russia and Britain as an explanation of how poorly the country was governed. By the 1870s, Russians were telling a different version, claiming the tsar was wise to overcome local interests that wanted the railway diverted this way and that. A similar story is told about the Ulm-Friedrichshafen railway that includes a remarkably straight stretch bypassing many settlements - as the story goes due to endless debates between local advocates about what village to serve, which were ended when the King of Württemberg took out a ruler and drew a straight line saying "this is how I want my railway built".

What actually happened was that the road was laid out by engineers and he endorsed their advice to build in a straight line. The curve, also called the Verebinsky bypass, was actually built in 1877, 26 years after the line came into being, to circumvent a steep gradient that lasted for 17 km (10.6 mi). Heading for St Petersburg, trains would pick up so much speed that they steamed straight past the next station, while those heading for Moscow needed four locomotives to get up the hill. In 2001, the bypass was closed as a new viaduct had been opened.

=== High-speed rail ===
In 2001, Russia's first dedicated high-speed rail line was planned to be constructed along the same route, but the project was eventually shelved amid ecological protests and concerns about the fragile environment of the Valdai Hills. In 2019, the start of a new design phase was given approval. Construction on the Moscow–Saint Petersburg high-speed railway began in March 2024.

== Operations ==
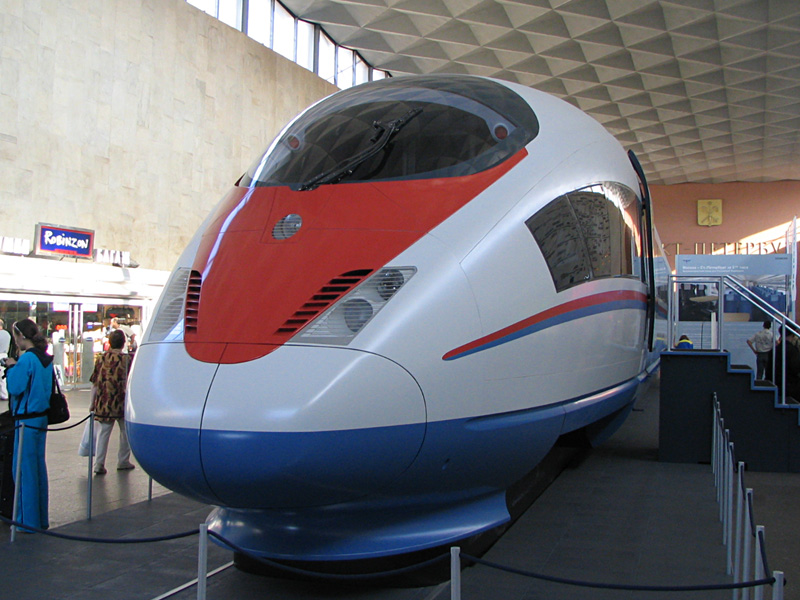
Siemens Velaro RUS in waiting hall of Moskovsky terminal in St. Petersburg

The maximum speed is 250 km/h (155 mph), however this speed is allowed only on less than 40 km (25 mi) of the line. A maximum speed of 220 km/h (140 mph) is permitted for 110 km (68 mi) of the line. The rest of the route allows a maximum speed of 200 km/h (124 mph). The fastest train takes 3 hours and 30 minutes (which gives an average speed of 185 km/h (115 mph)). The Siemens Velaro RUS train, also known as Sapsan, has operated on this line since 2009, running below their maximum speed of 300 km/h (186 mph) because of difficulties upgrading all the track. Russian Railways spent nearly $1 billion on eight trains. In 2019, a third order of €1.1 billion for 13 more trains of the same model was signed.

Since 1931 the famous Krasnaya Strela ("Red Arrow") train has left Moscow at 23:55 daily, arriving in St Petersburg at 07:55 the next morning, and vice versa.

The railway is relatively congested, which means that only a few high speed trains can run each day. There are proposals to build a parallel high-speed railway allowing speeds up to 400 km/h (250 mph), at an estimated cost of 696 bn roubles with an original estimated completion of 2018.

=== Major stations ===
Major stations include (south to north) Kryukovo (Zelenograd), Klin, Redkino, Tver, Likhoslavl, Kalashnikovo, Vyshny Volochyok, Bologoye, Okulovka, Luka, Malaya Vishera, Chudovo, Lyuban, Tosno and Obukhovo.

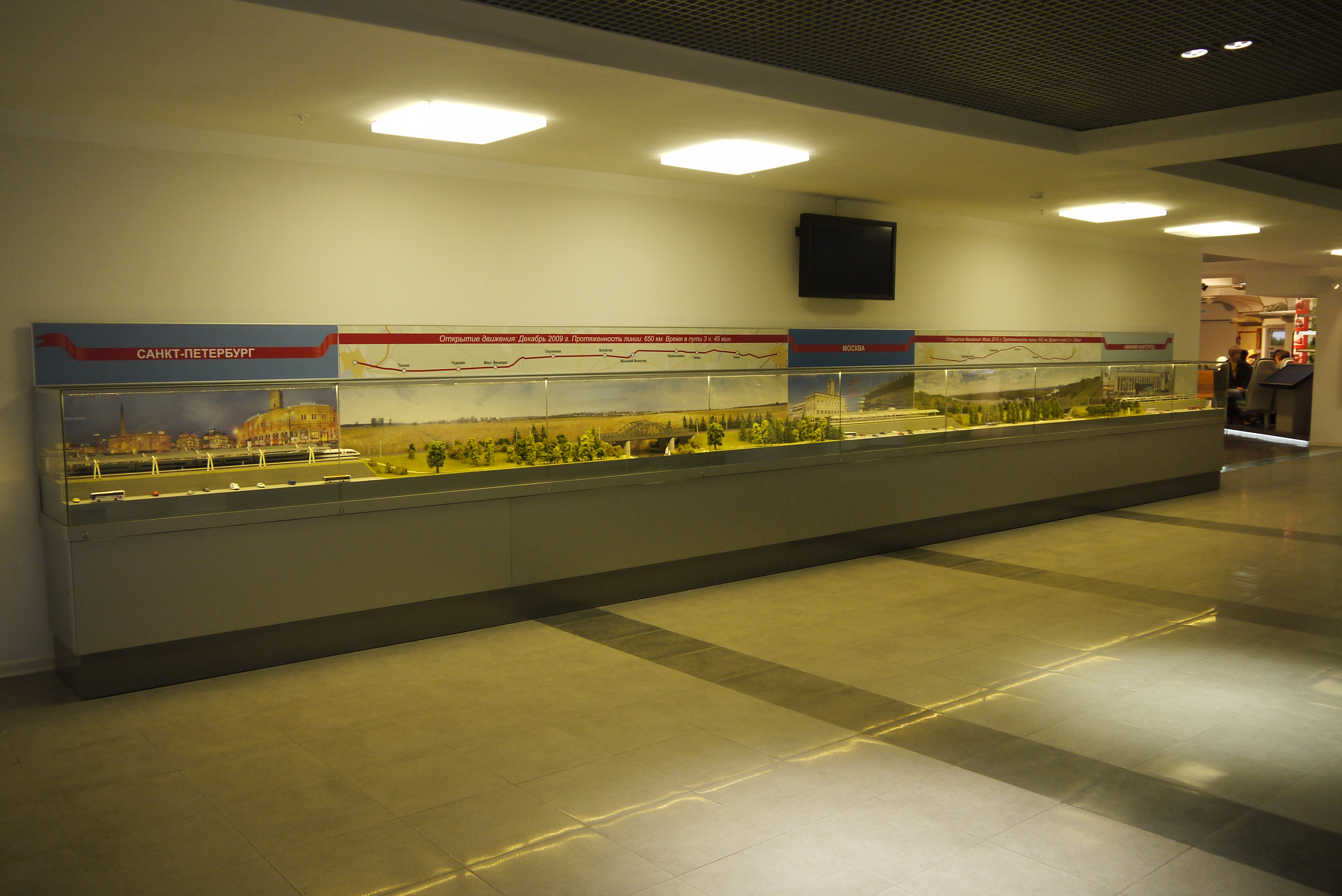
OO gauge model of the Moscow–St Petersburg/Nizhny Novgorod railway in the Museum of the Moscow Railway, Moscow

== Incidents ==
On 16 August 1988, 31 people were killed when the Avrora derailed while traveling at high speed on a stretch of defective track near Bologoye.

=== 2007 explosion ===
On 13 August 2007 an intercity passenger train to St Petersburg from Moscow derailed shortly before reaching Malaya Vishera after a bomb explosion. There were 30 injuries and no deaths, and railway traffic was blocked in both directions for a few days. Two men from the Ingushetia region of North Caucasus, Salambek Dzakhkiyev and Maksharip Khidriyev, were charged in relation to this incident. They were acquitted in January 2010 on the terrorism charge, but sentenced to prison terms on related charges. The court decided they delivered the explosives to the person who actually planted them, the leader of the terrorist cell, Pavel Kosolapov, at large at time of the trial, but were not aware how it was going to get used. Dzakhkiyev and his defense lawyer, Magomed Razakov, were also convicted of trying to bribe the investigator. Dzakhkiyev was sentenced to ten years' imprisonment, Khidriyev four years, Razakov two years two months. The acquittal was upheld by the Supreme Court in March 2010.

=== 2009 explosion ===
On 27 November 2009 four cars from train No. 166 derailed while travelling between Moscow and St. Petersburg. The derailment was a terrorist act caused by the detonation of 7 kilograms (15 lb) of TNT equivalent. At least 27 people were killed and 96 injured. In a secondary explosion on 28 November, directed at investigators, Alexander Bastrykin, head of the Investigative Committee, was injured and hospitalised.

The incident was reported to have similarities with the 2007 explosion.

== See also ==
- Moscow–Saint Petersburg high-speed railway
- Rail transport in Russia
- Russian Railways
- Transportation in Moscow
- Emperor railway station, Pushkin town
