= Tver Karelians =

Inhabitants of regions of Tver, Saint Petersburg, and Moscow

Total population
- 2,764 (2020)

Languages
- Tver Karelian

Religion
- Eastern Orthodox Christianity

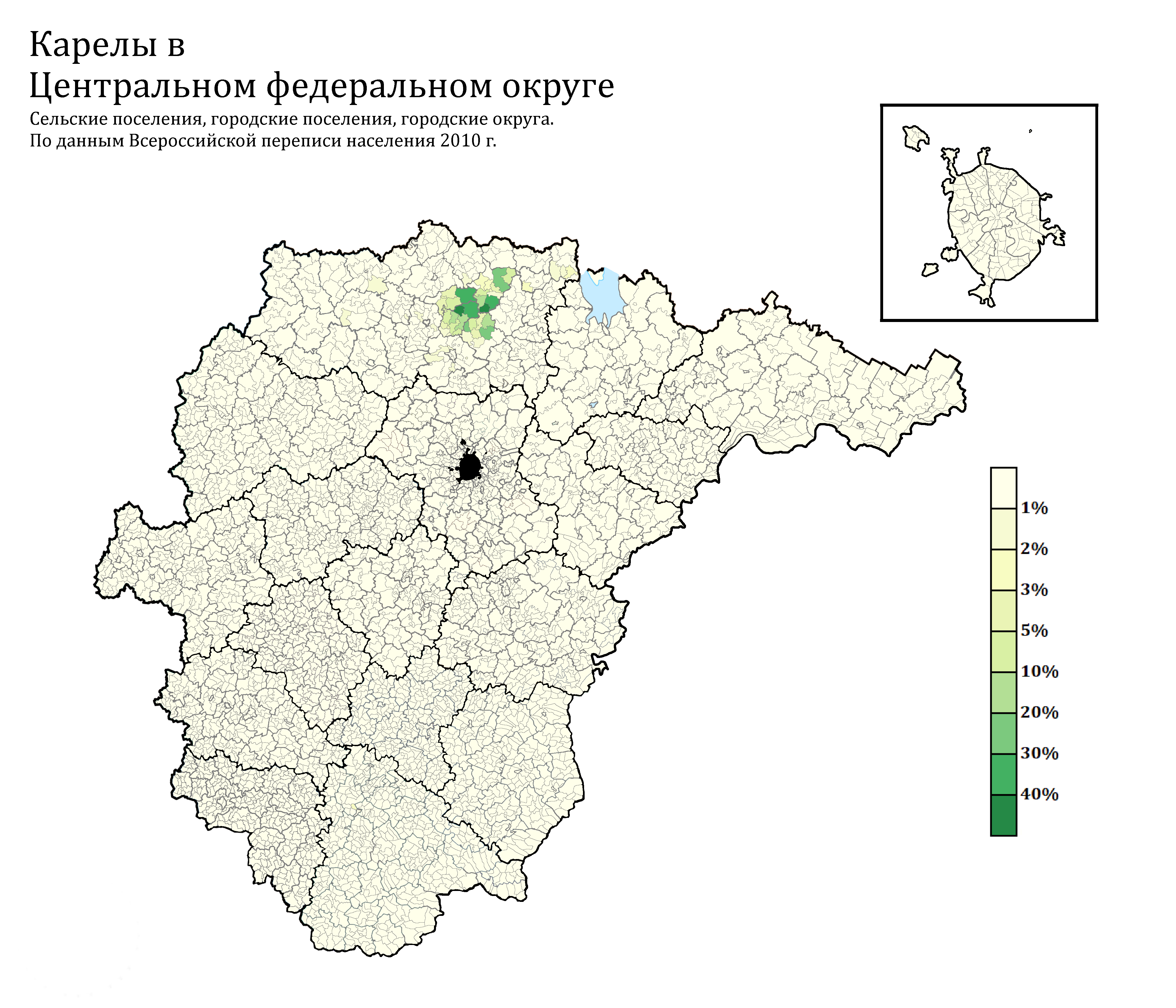
Settlement of Karelians in the Central Federal District by urban and rural settlements in %, 2010 census.

Tver Karelians are a people who inhabit regions of Tver, Saint Petersburg, and Moscow. Their dialect is remarkable in that it does not borrow from other Balto-Finnic languages due to centuries of geographical isolation. Although the number of Tver Karelian people was about 14,633 in 2002, very few (about 25 in one census) named the dialect as their primary language. The number of Tver Karelians was 7,394 in 2010 and 2,764 in 2020.

== Origins ==
The Tver Karelians migrated from Karelia, mostly Kexholm County, to the Tver region during the 16th and 17th centuries to escape war, increased taxes, and forced conversion from the Orthodox religion to Lutheranism imposed by Sweden.

The first wave of migrations occurred during the 1570s, when Sweden was attempting to occupy Kexholm. By 1580, when Sweden finally captured Kexholm, the number of farms in the County had decreased by 489, and 800 families had fled the city of Kexholm. In total around 6400 people had fled. They were encouraged by the Tsar Boris Godunov to settle on the sparsely populated land between Moscow and Lake Ladoga.

A larger wave of migrations followed the Treaty of Stolbovo in 1617 at the conclusion of the Ingrian war where Russia was defeated by Sweden, and Ingria and Kexholm County were ceded to Sweden. After the treaty up to 30,000 Karelians migrated to Russia, peak migration occurring between the 1640s and 1660s. Most left voluntarily, encouraged by the promise of livestock, seed grain and tax exemptions, but in 1657 some people on the coasts of Lake Ladoga were forced to leave by the Russian military.

In Russia, the Karelians mostly settled on the region around the city of Tver, in villages that had been abandoned due to war and plague.

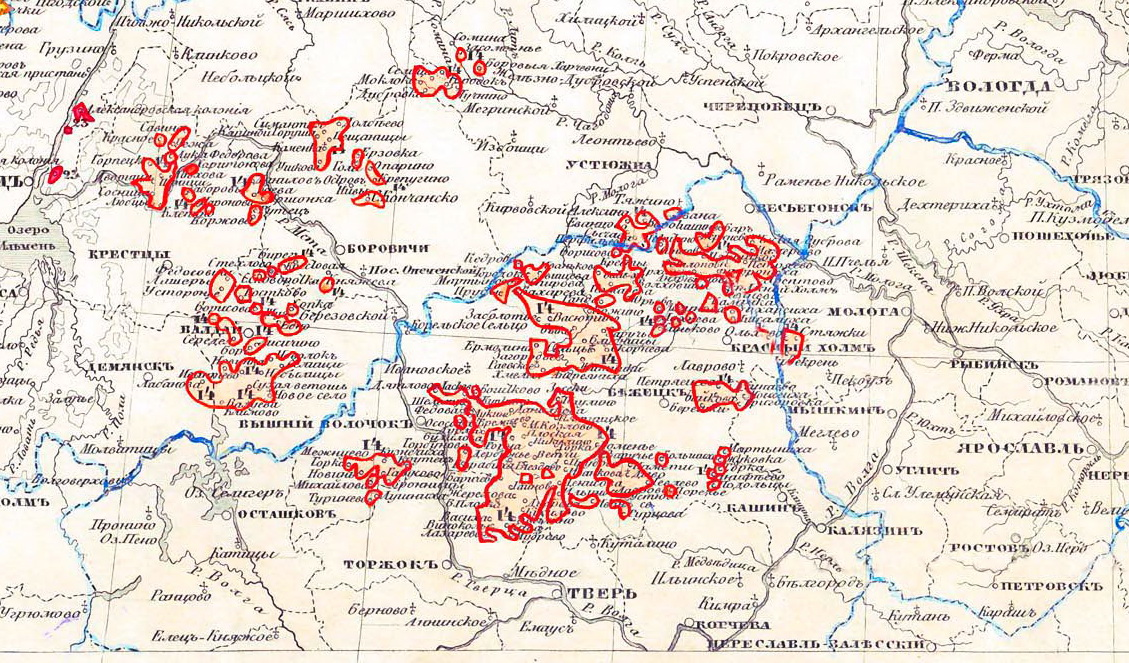
Fragment of the Ethnographic map of European Russia by Peter von Köppen, 1851. Areas of settlement of the Karelians are highlighted (No. 14).

== History ==
In 1926, the Tver Karelian numbered about 140,567. 95% identified Karelian as their mother tongue. Between 1937 and 1939, the Karelian National Okrug was recognised with its centre in Likhoslavl. Since 1997, the Tver Karelian have had national and cultural autonomy.

=== Decrease in national identity ===
Decreases in Tver Karelian national identity in the twentieth century may be associated with factors such as loss of religion to atheism; loss of native language; and loss of the inter-generational passage of cultural knowledge such as "Babkin tradition" (traditional craftsmanship). In the 1950s, the Soviet Union experienced a mass migration from rural to urban regions. This affected the Tver Karelians as many of the population were farmers and or resident in rural areas. Because of such predominantly rural residence, the term "Karelian" might in some circumstances colloquially equate to "Country bumpkin".

=== Changes in the Tver Karelian population over time ===
* In the USSR

** in the Tver region

== Language ==
In contrast to other languages and dialects, the Tver Karelian language continues in its archaic form. Most probably, it is close to a Karelian proto-language. Vocabulary of Tver dialect was influenced by and borrowed from the language of the medieval Egonskoy villages (which no longer exist). Reliable information about the origin of writing of the Tver Karelian language is not available. By 1930, Karelian was commonly written in Cyrillic and or the Latin script.
