= Rail transport in Tver Oblast =

Transport system in Russia

Overview
- Locale: Tver oblast, Russia

Service
- Depot: October Railway

History
- Opened: Since 1850

Technical
- Line length: 21.4 kilometres (13.3 mi)

Rail transport in Tver Oblast is one of the most important components of the region's transport system. There are more than 100 railway stations in the region, and the total length of railway tracks is 1,800 kilometres (1,100 mi). The largest railway hubs in the region are Bologoye, Rzhev, and Sonkovo. Most of the Tver region railroads belongs to the Moscow region (formerly the Moscow Division) of the October Railway.

Railway transport in the territory of presentday Tver region has been developing since 1850, when the railway section between Vyshny Volochyok and Tver started operating. A year later, the entire railway line between Saint Petersburg and Moscow was commissioned. In the second half of the 19th century, and the first half of the 20th century, other railway lines were gradually built in the region, including the Riga and Savyolovo directions, a section of the latitudinal line Riga–Pskov–Bologoye–Rybinsk–Yaroslavl, the Bologoye–Polotsk line, as well as other railway lines and spurs.

The Saint Petersburg–Moscow main line (the main route of the October Railway) crosses the region from northwest to southeast. It is electrified, has at least two tracks throughout its entire length, and is intensively used for passenger transport. A significant portion of passenger transport is transit, but suburban services are well-developed, too. Other railway lines in the region are used less, and some of its sections are classified as low-active. The Moscow–Saint Petersburg high-speed railway is also planned to pass through the region.

== History and perspectives ==
=== History of railway development in the region in the 19th century and the first half of the 20th century ===
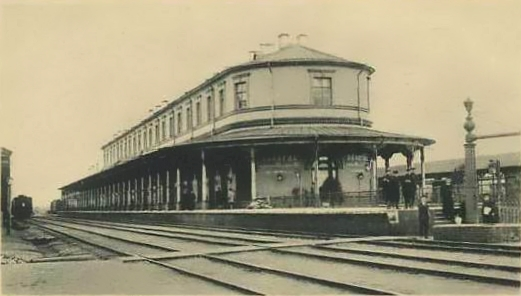
Bologoye station of the Nikolaevskaya Railway, the station building on the Moscow side. Pre-revolutionary postcard

The first railway line to pass through the territory of modern Tver region (Nikolaevskaya Railway) was built in the late 1840s and officially opened in 1851. The railway was commissioned in stages, with train services on the Vyshny Volochyok–Tver section that started its work in 1850] The railway passed near Tver (the station was located a few kilometers from the city), and in 1851, it connected Tver and other cities in the region with Moscow and Saint Petersburg.

In the late 19th century and early 20th century private railway lines built by the Moscow–Vindava–Rybinsk Railway company and other organizations were connected to the mainline railway. In 1870, train services began on the Bologoye–Rybinsk line, which passed through Udomlya, Bezhetsk, and Savelino (now Sonkovo), as well as on the section Likhoslavl (then Ostashkovo)–Torzhok. In 1874, it was extended to Rzhev. In 1897, a line from Bologoye to Pskov was opened, in 1898-a section from Sonkovo to Krasny Kholm, and in 1899,from Sonkovo to Kashin.

In 1900 a railway was built from Moscow to the Savyolovo station (now in the city of Kimry). In 1901, the Moscow-Vindava (Ventspils) railway, passing through Rzhev, was commissioned. In 1907, the Bologoye–Polotsk railway line, passing through Ostashkov and Velikiye Luki, was opened. In the 1910s, entrepreneur Yu. M. Kuvshinova organized the construction of the Kuvshinovo access track-a railway from Torzhok to the village of Kamennoe (now the city of Kuvshinovo), where her paper factory was located. In 1913, a decision was made to extend the access track from Kuvshinovo to Selizharovo, and this section was opened in 1917. In the post-revolutionary period, a section was built from Selizharovo station to a junction with the Bologoye-Polotsk railway (Soblagho station), which was opened in 1928. In 1913, the railway from Krasny Kholm was extended to the Ovinishche-I station.

In 1918 all Russian railways were nationalized and transferred to the People's Commissariat of Communication Routes of the Russian Socialist Federative Soviet Republic, and further construction of mainline railways throughout the 20th century was organized exclusively by the state. In 1919, train services began at Kalyazin station, connecting railway lines from Savyolovo (Kimry) and Kashin. In the same year, the railway passed through Sandovo, and further to Mga, and the completion of this line in 1921, effectively made the Savyolovo direction a backup for the Moscow–Leningrad railway. Also in 1919, the Ovinishche–Vesyegonsk–Suda railway line was built, but only a few trains ran on the Vesyegonsk–Suda section-a temporary wooden bridge over the Mologa River was destroyed by ice drift the following spring after its construction and was not rebuilt. Had the Vesyegonsk-Suda section been fully operational, it would have been the shortest connection between Moscow and Cherepovets. The flooding of the Rybinsk Reservoir did not prevent the implementation of this plan; by that time, the Vesyegonsk-Suda line had long been abandoned.

In the early 1930s a line was built from Zemtsy to Zharkovsky and Lomonosovo, with a planned extension northward to Soblagho and southward to the Smolensk hub. In 1936, a dead-end line from Doroshikha to Vasilyevsky Mokh was opened, primarily used for transporting peat (later, narrow-gauge peat railways saw intensive development in the Vasilyevsky Mokh area). In 1937, another dead-end line was opened from Reshetnikovo (Moscow region) to Konakovo.

The construction of railways significantly influenced the region's settlement system. Station settlements emerged along mainline railways, some of which (Bologoye, Likhoslavl, Nelidovo, Udomlya, and others) later became cities or district-center settlements (Maksatikha, Sonkovo, Spirovо, and others).

=== Railways during the World War II ===
During World War II in 1941–1943, many western and southern districts of Kalinin (now Tver) region, and for a short period in late 1941, the regional center itself, were occupied by German troops, and railroads were in the zone of active combat operations.

On 16 December 1941 Soviet troops liberated the city, and found the railroad hub's infrastructure heavily damaged, but less than two months later, the station's operations and train services on the mainline were restored. In January 1942, during the Toropets-Kholm Operation, undertaken to cut off German troops from transport routes, Soviet forces fought their way to the Ostashkov-Toropets-Western Dvina line and liberated Toropets, with the fiercest resistance from German troops occurring at the railway station. In late 1942, during the Sychevka Offensive Operation, the 20th Army fought to capture the Rzhev-Sychevka railway line.

The northern and eastern parts of the region were not occupied, but railway stations and hubs suffered heavily from bombings by the Luftwaffe. The Bologoye railway hub was particularly affected, with 527 air raids carried out on it between 1941 and 1943.

During the war, railway lines in the region, both in non-occupied and liberated territories, were intensively used for moving military trains and cargo, as well as for organizing evacuations. Between 1942 and 1943, alongside the restoration of the Zemtsy-Zharkovsky-Lomonosovo railway line, construction began on a frontline railway from Zemtsy station to Soblagho, but this construction was later halted, and the tracks were dismantled.

=== Development of railways in the second half of the 20th and early 21st centuries ===
In the second half of the 20th century, large-scale construction of new mainline railways in the region was not undertaken, but existing lines were modernized, and steam locomotives were universally replaced by diesel locomotives and electric locomotives. In 1962 the electrification of the Leningrad-Moscow railway was completed, with a route speed of 130 kilometers per hour achieved by 1963, and 200 kilometers per hour by 1966. In the 1960s, due to the construction of the Konakovo GRES, the route of the railway line to Konakovo was altered, and in 1966, the railway line from Reshetnikovo (Moscow region) to Konakovo GRES was electrified. Additionally, in the second half of the 20th century, departmental narrow-gauge railways developed intensively in the region, including the narrow-gauge railway of Construction Materials Plant No. 2, the first section of which was commissioned in 1951; the narrow-gauge railway of the Vasilyevsky Peat Enterprise, to which new sections were added, and many other narrow-gauge railways serving individual enterprises. However, by the end of the 20th century, a trend toward the reduction of narrow-gauge railways emerged, and many were closed, dismantled, or reduced in the 1990s and 2000s. The Zharkovsky-Promyshlennaya (near Soshno) railway line and the 40-kilometer railway from Vyshny Volochyok station to quarries were also closed and dismantled.

=== Accidents ===
Several railway accidents occurred in the region. On 16 August 1988 the high-speed train Aurora crashed on the Berezayka-Poplavenets section (13–14 kilometers from Bologoye–Moskovskoye station), resulting in 31 deaths and 182 injuries. On 3 March 1992 a collision between a passenger train from Riga to Moscow and a freight train occurred at the Podsosenka siding: 43 people were killed and 108 injured. On 15 June 2005, a major environmental disaster occurred on the Zubtsov–Aristovo section: a train carrying fuel oil derailed, 10 tank cars overturned and depressurized, spilling 200 to 300 tons of fuel oil onto the ground, with about 2 tons reaching the Gostyushka River, a tributary of the Vazuza, which flows into the Volga 8 kilometers from the accident site. On 27 November 2009, at 285-kilometer (Alyoshinka-Uglovka section), near the border with Novgorod region, the high-speed train Nevsky Express traveling from Moscow to Saint Petersburg derailed, with two rear cars detaching and overturning, causing 27 deaths and over 90 injuries.

=== Unrealized projects ===
In 1867 a decision was made to build a railway line connecting Rybinsk with the Nikolaevskaya Railway. Four possible routes were proposed: directly to Saint Petersburg, to Bologoye, to Osechenka, or to Tver. The first two proposals were rejected, followed by the Tver route. Ultimately, it was decided to build the railway to Osechenka. However, during construction, the route was changed, and the railway was laid to Bologoye.

In 1910–1912 the nobility of Staritsa Uyezd decided to build a railway on the Tver–Mikulino–Lotoshino–Shakhovskaya section. A station building was constructed in Mikulino, but World War I prevented the construction of the railway itself, despite prepared sleepers. As a result, this project was never realized, although the station building has been preserved to this day.

In 1913 a decision was made to build two railway lines: Mga–Volga (Mologa Railway), which would have provided a direct route from Saint Petersburg to Rybinsk, and Krasny Kholm–Suda, which was intended to be part of a major mainline heading north from Moscow. The intersection of these railways, Ovinishche station, would have become a major railway hub. The Ovinishche–Suda line was built, but the Vesyegonsk–Suda section was operated for a very short time before being abandoned and later flooded by the Rybinsk Reservoir. A decision to rebuild this section during the Great Patriotic War was not implemented. Plans to build the Ovinishche–Volga railway were also abandoned after 1917.

In 1942 Stalin decided to build railways parallel to existing ones. One of these was to be the Volokolamsk–Sychevka–Bely–Velizh–Vitebsk line, which was planned to use the infrastructure of the existing Volokolamsk–Smolensk narrow-gauge railway. These plans were not implemented, although this line was shown as under construction in the 1943 Atlas of Railways and Waterways of the USSR.

In the 1980s construction began on the Doroninskaya–Pereguzochnaya (settlement of Novaya Orsha) line, intended for transporting peat extracted by the Orshinskoye-I peat enterprise, bypassing the Vasilyevsky Mokh station. An intermediate Tovanovo station was planned for the line. By the early 1990s the Doroninskaya–Pereguzochnaya line was nearly completed, with tracks laid. The construction of Pereguzochnaya station was not finished, and peat transport on the new line did not take place. In the 1990s a decision was made to abandon the completion of the Doroninskaya–Pereguzochnaya (settlement of Novaya Orsha) line. By 2005 it was completely dismantled.

=== Perspectives ===
Projects for the high-speed railway between Moscow and Saint Petersburg, which would pass through Tver region, have been discussed since the 1980s, with ongoing debates in society between supporters of the high-speed railway and opponents who consider modernizing the existing railway line more practical.

By order of the Russian Federation Government, the high-speed railway project has been included in the Railway Transport Development Strategy until 2030, with plans to enable train speeds of up to 350 kilometers per hour and cover the 659-kilometer distance in 2.5 hours. One of the high-speed railway projects for Moscow-Saint Petersburg envisages the construction of a fenced railway with two stops in Veliky Novgorod and Tver, with the New Tver station planned to be located 7–8 kilometers south of Tver. As of 2013, neither construction nor design of the high-speed railway has begun.

The Federal Program for the Development of Russia's Transport System provides for the construction of second tracks on the Mga-Sonkovo-Yaroslavl section by 2015. Additionally, the Railway Transport Development Strategy in the Russian Federation until 2030 includes the electrification of the Sonkovo-Dno-Pechory-Pskovskie section, which would allow redirecting some prospective passenger traffic from main routes to parallel lines. Media reports also mention planned reconstruction and electrification of the Sonkovo-Mga section, part of which runs through Tver region, as well as the reconstruction of Sonkovo station. Since 2015, JSC Russian Railways has been implementing a project to increase the capacity of the Dmitrov]Sonkovo-Mga direction, which involves building over 500 kilometers of second tracks.

== Enterprises and infrastructure ==
=== Railway lines, hubs and stations ===
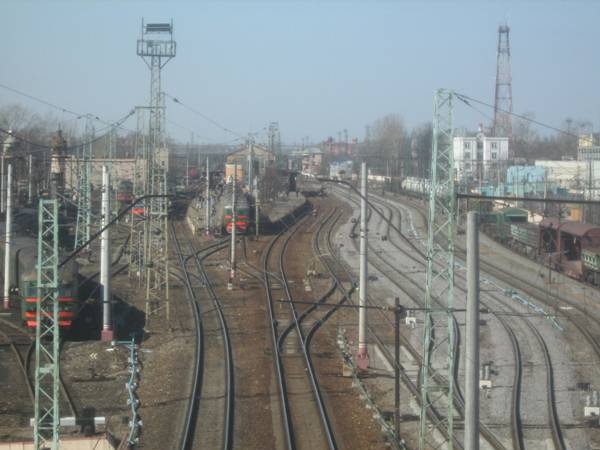
Moscow-Saint Petersburg railway mainline near Tver station (view from the overpass)

The region's railway lines include a section of the Saint Petersburg–Moscow railway mainline, sections of the Riga and Savyolovo directions originating from Moscow, a section of the latitudinal railway mainline Riga–Pskov–Bologoye–Rybinsk–Yaroslavl, as well as other railway directions, lines, and spurs. These railway lines cover most districts of Tver region (except Belsky, Lesnoy, Molokovsky, and Rameshkovsky) and 31 out of 36 district centers (except Bely, Lesnoye, Molokovo, Rameshki, and Staritsa, where the railway passes a few kilometers from the city). According to Rosstat, the operational length of railway tracks is 1803 kilometers, which accounts for approximately 73 percent of the total operational length of the division (2348 kilometers), and the railway network density is 21.4 kilometers of track per 1000 square kilometers of area.

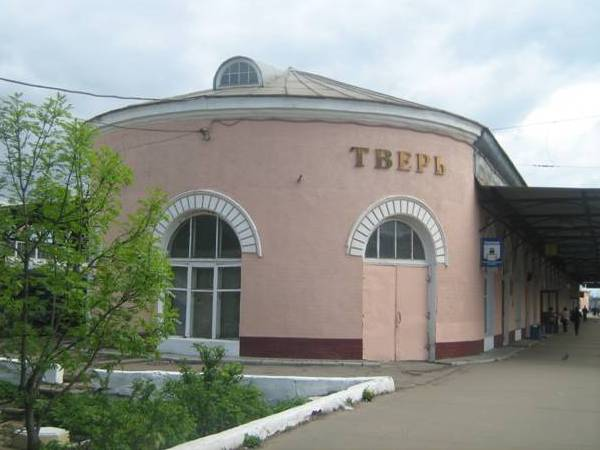
Tver station. The old railway station building between the tracks

According to the region administration, there are more than 100 railway stations in its territory, and together with stopping points and platforms, their number exceeds 200.

The largest railway hubs in the region are Bologoye, Rzhev, Tver, and Sonkovo. The Bologoye hub is the largest railway hub in the region, comprising five stations, railway tracks in five directions with several overpasses, two-level interchanges, and loop turnarounds, as well as a track facility with over 20 tracks and a fan-shaped depot. The Bologoye railway hub is located on the Saint Petersburg-Moscow mainline, approximately equidistant from both megacities, at its intersection with the latitudinal Riga–Pskov–Bologoye–Yaroslavl mainline, and it is also the starting point of the Bologoye–Polotsk railway line (train movements in Bologoye are conducted in five directions). The hub is used for transit traffic in five destination areas.

=== Railway organizations ===
Most of the region's railways belong to the October Railway (exceptions include a small section of the Northern Railway in the east of the region near Sonkovo, a small section of the Savyolovo direction, which belongs to the Moscow Railway up to the Savyolovo station, and departmental narrow-gauge railways). The region was home to three divisions of the October Railway: Rzhev, Bologoye (liquidated in 1996), and Moscow (liquidated in 2010), which operated in the territories of Moscow, Novgorod, and Tver regions, including freight and passenger transport in Tver region. The October Railway is one of the largest economic entities in the region, making a significant contribution to the Tver region budget (for example, in 2005, it transferred about 300 million rubles in tax payments to the budget revenues, accounting for approximately 2 percent of the total regional budget revenue, and in some districts (e.g., Bologoye and Sonkovo), it is the largest taxpayer

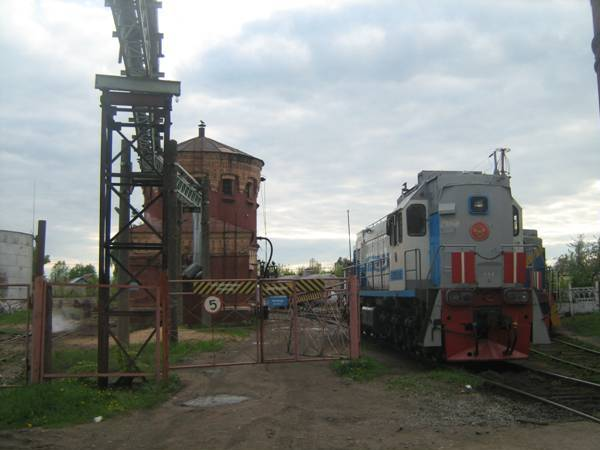
Tver locomotive depot

The October Railway collaborates with the Tver Administration, jointly addressing issues related to the development of railway hubs, station repairs, construction of crossings, rolling stock upgrades, and passenger transport, including transport for subsidized passengers. Since 2009, suburban services in Tver region have been transitioned to a state contract system, with the contract volume between the Tver region Administration and the October Railway for 2009 amounting to 63 million rubles; this amount remained unchanged in 2010. As of 2010, the most pressing issues included the organization and safety of high-speed Sapsan train operations, the restoration of canceled routes and the creation of new routes in demand by passengers, and the construction of infrastructure facilities-an overpass in Chupriyanovka, pedestrian bridges in Tver and Spirovo.

=== Narrow-gauge railways ===
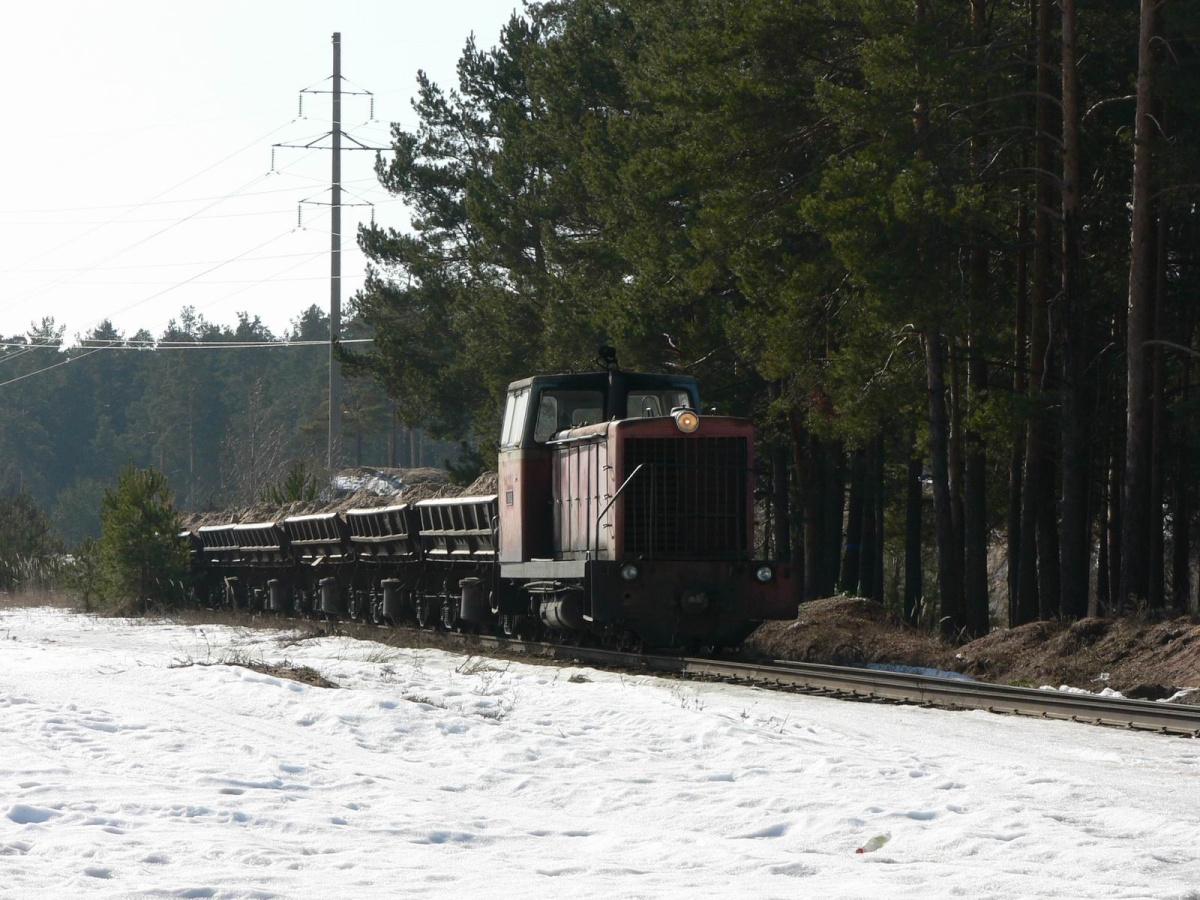
Narrow-gauge railway of Tver Construction Materials Plant No. 2 on the outskirts of Tver

According to researcher S. D. Bolashenko, as of 2009, seven industrial, peat-transport, and logging narrow-gauge railways, owned by various organizations, were operating in Tver region. The Narrow-gauge railway of KSM-2 factory ("silicate plant"), 9 kilometers long with a gauge of 750 millimeters, connects the plant's territory on the northeastern outskirts of Tver with the Krasnogorsky sand quarry; according to S. D. Bolashenko, it is the most freight-intensive line in Russia among narrow-gauge railways with a 750-mm gauge and a significant length (over 3 kilometers). On the southeastern outskirts of the city of Bologoye, the narrow-gauge railway of the Bologoye Sleeper Impregnation Plant, approximately 3 kilometers long, operates. In Zubtsovsky District, the Knyazhegorskaya narrow-gauge railway, subordinate to the Knyazhegorsky timber enterprise, is used for timber transport. In Kuvshinovsky District, the narrow-gauge railway of the Rantsevskoye peat enterprise is used to transport peat to the Kamenskaya Thermal Power Plant.

Many narrow-gauge railways have been partially dismantled in recent years and are at risk of closure. The network of peat-transport narrow-gauge railways of the Vasilyevsky peat enterprise, operating in the north of Kalininsky District and used to transport peat to a transshipment station in the settlement of Vasilyevsky Mokh, is on the verge of closure. In 2008 the previously existing line split into two disconnected sections (in the area of the Vasilyevsky Mokh and Novaya Orsha settlements), with all other lines abandoned or dismantled by that time; the line's final liquidation is expected in 2011. In 2012 dismantling began on the remaining Mezh–Trosno section of the Nelidovo narrow-gauge railway, used for timber transport, with tracks and structures partially deteriorated but passable for motor trolleys. In 2009, the narrow-gauge railway of the Kimry peat enterprise, about 10 kilometers long, was closed.

== Railway Transport Operations ==
=== Overall traffic intensity ===
Tver region is a transit region, and its location within international transport corridors results in significant passenger and freight traffic through its territory. The most intensive traffic occurs on the main route of the October Railway-according to O. I. Alexandrov, head of Tver station, the total number of long-distance, suburban, and freight trains passing through the station, according to the summer 2009 schedule, was expected to increase to 122 train pairs per day, with an interval of 7–9 minutes. On other sections, traffic is less intensive; for example, according to 2007 data, Sonkovo station, located at the intersection of the Savyolovo direction and the latitudinal Pskov-Bologoye-Rybinsk-Yaroslavl mainline, handled an average of 29 pairs of freight trains per day (and a few pairs of passenger trains).

According to O. S. Ulyanov, head of the Moscow Division of the October Railway, the region has many low-activity sections, including Bologoye–Velikiye Luki, Torzhok–Soblagho, Torzhok–Rzhev, Savyolovo–Uglich, Savyolovo–Sonkovo, and Sonkovo–Vesyegonsk. Traffic intensity on the Bologoye–Polotsk direction has decreased compared to the Soviet period due to reduced freight flows to Ukraine and Belarus, and on the Torzhok–Rzhev section due to changes in passenger train routes. The railway relies on support from the region administration to operate unprofitable but essential low-activity sections, without which they risk closure.

=== Passenger railway service ===
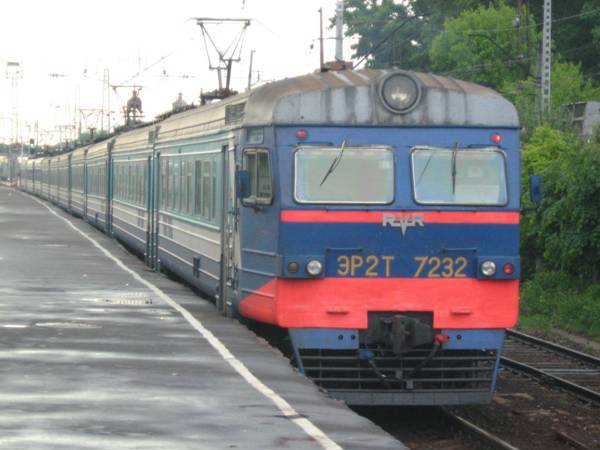
The Bologoye-Moscow passenger train stops at Tver station

On the Moscow-Saint Petersburg railway line, during peak load periods, up to 70 pairs of passenger trains operate daily. A significant number of passenger trains passing through Tver and Bologoye connect Moscow and Saint Petersburg. In the summer of 2009, 30 pairs of trains operate on the Moscow–Saint Petersburg passenger route, including 18 regular trains (two of which are privately operated), three high-speed trains, one mail-luggage train, and 12 additional trains for one-time use. The number of passengers departing by public railway transport in the Tver region was 9.2 million in 2006, 9.4 million in 2007, and 9.0 million in 2008. In 2009, the number was 7.7 million.

Long-distance trains on the Moscow–Saint Petersburg route (except for a few express trains) stop at Tver, Vyshny Volochek, Bologoye, and other stations within the region, depending on the schedule. At the end of 2009, the Sapsan electric train was launched on the Moscow–Saint Petersburg line; high-speed trains in the Tver region have been subject to attacks by citizens dissatisfied with the inconveniences caused by their introduction (cancellation of low-cost daytime trains and commuter trains, prolonged closure of level crossings). Some media outlets have reported incidents of Sapsan trains hitting residents of the region, resulting in fatalities.

In addition to trains on the Moscow–Saint Petersburg route, long-distance trains also pass through the region along the main line of the October Railway from Moscow to Borovichi, Veliky Novgorod, Murmansk, Ostashkov, Petrozavodsk, Pskov, Tallinn, Helsinki, as well as trains traveling from Saint Petersburg and Murmansk in southern and southeastern directions to Nizhny Novgorod, Novorossiysk, Samara, Simferopol, Kharkiv, and other cities in Russia and Ukraine via Bologoye–Tver. Since 2005 a high-speed electric train has operated on the Tver–Moscow route, and since 2008, it has operated on the Bologoye–Moscow route.

Commuter services in the region are most developed on the Tver–Moscow route, with approximately 15–20 pairs of electric trains daily. Eight pairs of commuter trains connect Tver with Bologoye, four pairs with Torzhok, and up to 10 pairs of trains run from Bologoye to Okulovka (Novgorod Region). Eight pairs of electric trains to Moscow operate from Konakovo, and 11 to 16 pairs from Savelovo station. Several commuter trains, consisting of a locomotive and passenger cars, operate from Bologoye westward to Valday and eastward to Sonkovo, as well as along the Riga direction. Almost all cities and district center settlements through which railways pass have commuter services, with at least one or two commuter trains per day; the exception is the settlement of Zharkovsky, where the only commuter train to Zemtsy station runs twice a week. Nevertheless, many cities and district center settlements in the Tver region do not have direct rail connections with the regional center, and rail travel between district centers and the regional center is only possible with transfers. For example, travel from Konakovo to Tver requires a transfer in Reshetnikovo; theoretically, direct service could be established, but this would require the reconstruction of Reshetnikovo station and would complicate operations on the main line.

Since 1 October 2015, on the Moscow (Leningradskaya Railway Station)–Tver route, in addition to regular commuter trains, high-speed Lastochka trains have been operating, with a travel time of just over one and a half hours. Some of them stop at Zavidovo and Redkino.

Fares for passenger and luggage transport in commuter services are set by the regional energy commission, subordinate to the regional administration, using a special methodology. Since 1 January 2009, the maximum fare for passenger transport in commuter services for the Moscow Branch of the October Railway has been set at 12 rubles per zone. At the same time, the regional administration is forced to compensate the railway for losses incurred from unprofitable commuter services on low-traffic routes. In 2008, 6 million rubles were allocated from the regional budget for this purpose. Since 2009, it is planned to transition the least active and most unprofitable routes to a state procurement system, while abolishing state regulation of fares for commuter passenger transport.

According to the Russian Railways website, a railbus operates on the Velikiye Luki–Nelidovo route under the Moscow Branch of the October Railway. The management of the October Railway and the Tver Region administration are also considering the use of railbuses for passenger transport on low-traffic routes (such as Kalyazin–Uglich, Zemtsy–Zharkovsky, Tver–Vasilyevsky Mokh, Rzhev–Osuga, Bologoye–Sonkovo, Torzhok–Rzhev, Torzhok–Soblago). The introduction of railbuses on these routes would free up mainline locomotives and passenger cars and reduce railway operating costs by approximately 40 percent, which would contribute to the development of commuter services on low-traffic routes.

=== Freight Transportation ===
According to the Tver Region administration, in 2006, over 2,292 thousand tons of freightwere loaded onto railway transport within the region (the total volume of freight transport in the region was 4,264.8 thousand tons). In subsequent years, the volume of freight shipments in the region increased compared to 2006, reaching 3.2 million tons in 2007 and 3.0 million tons in 2008. Additionally, according to the regional administration, 250 enterprises and organizations have railway sidings and use them for receiving freight and shipping products.

Discussing the issues of freight transport on low-traffic lines in 2007, O. S. Ulyanov (then the head of the Moscow Branch of the October Railway) noted the concentration of industry around the Rzhev railway junction and the considerable industrial potential of the Zharkovsky and Firovsky districts; other districts have weaker potential. According to him, "there are no large quarries producing inert freight, but timber loading is carried out at practically every station. Moreover, the railway supports the life support system of the districts—fuel depots, boiler houses… So, the significance of the railway for the region is, of course, great".
