= Vesyegonsk railway station =

Railway station in Tver Oblast, Russia

Vesyegonsk Весьегонск
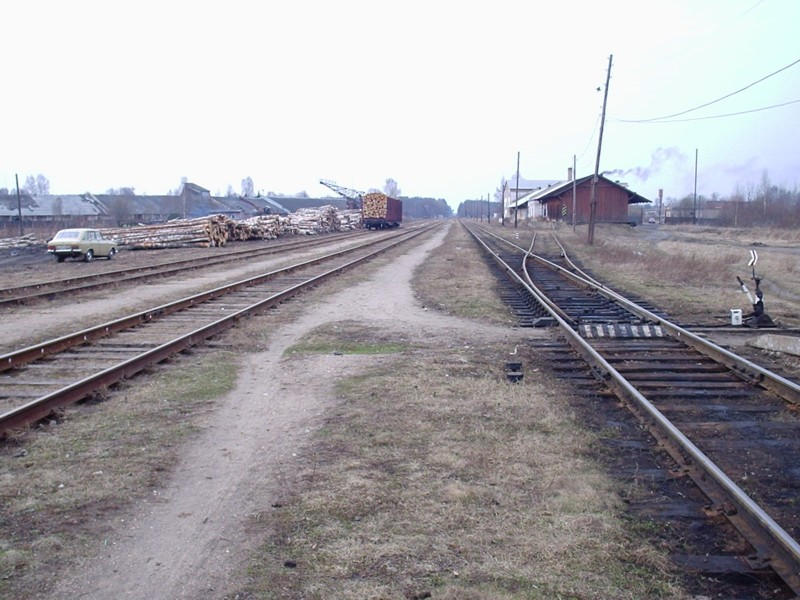

General information
- Location: Vesyegonsk; Tver Oblast; Russia
- Coordinates: 56.8559°N 37.3765°E
- Owner: Russian Railways
- Operator: Russian Railways
- Line: October Railway

History
- Opened: 1919
Location

Vesyegonsk railway station (Russian: станция Весьегонск) is a railway station located in Vesyegonsk, Tver Oblast in Russia. It is part of the October Railway, and is the terminus of the line that runs to Ovinishchi.

== History ==
Vesyegonsk station was built in 1919 on the new line constructed from Moscow to Cherepovets via Sonkovo railway station, as part of the Rybinsk-Pskov-Vindava railway. This involved the extension of the existing line from Sonkovo to Krasny Kholm railway station as far as Ovinishchi, and then to Vesyegonsk. This was then linked, via Ovinishchi, to the line to Saint Petersburg through the Mologsky passage at Pestovo.

By the early 1930s there were plans to build a line from Vesyegonsk to Suda, on the Babayevo-Cherepovets line, and a bridge was constructed across the Mologa river to carry the railway. The plan was abandoned after the creation of the Rybinsk Reservoir flooded much of the area, including part of Vesyegonsk. Vesyegonsk now forms the terminus of the line from Moscow. The station building was destroyed by fire in 1997, but the station control building still exists. There have been plans since 2011 to build a new bus and railway ticket office building, and for a four-car diesel-electric train to run from the station on the line to Moscow.

Plans to close the railway line to Vesyegonsk were reported in 2006, on the grounds that it was unprofitable. Concerns were raised that passenger numbers were very high in summer and the bus services would not be able to cope, and that fuel supplies, as well as cargo transport of mixed fodder and molasses for agricultural producers in the area, were delivered by the line. The plans to close the line were scrapped later that year.

== Services ==
There are commuter trains to Sonkovo, via Ovinishchi and Krasny Kholm, which provide onward services to Moscow via Kalyazin, and Saint Petersburg via Bologoye.
