= Krasny Kholm railway station =

Railway station in Krasny Kholm, Russia

Krasny Kholm Красный Холм
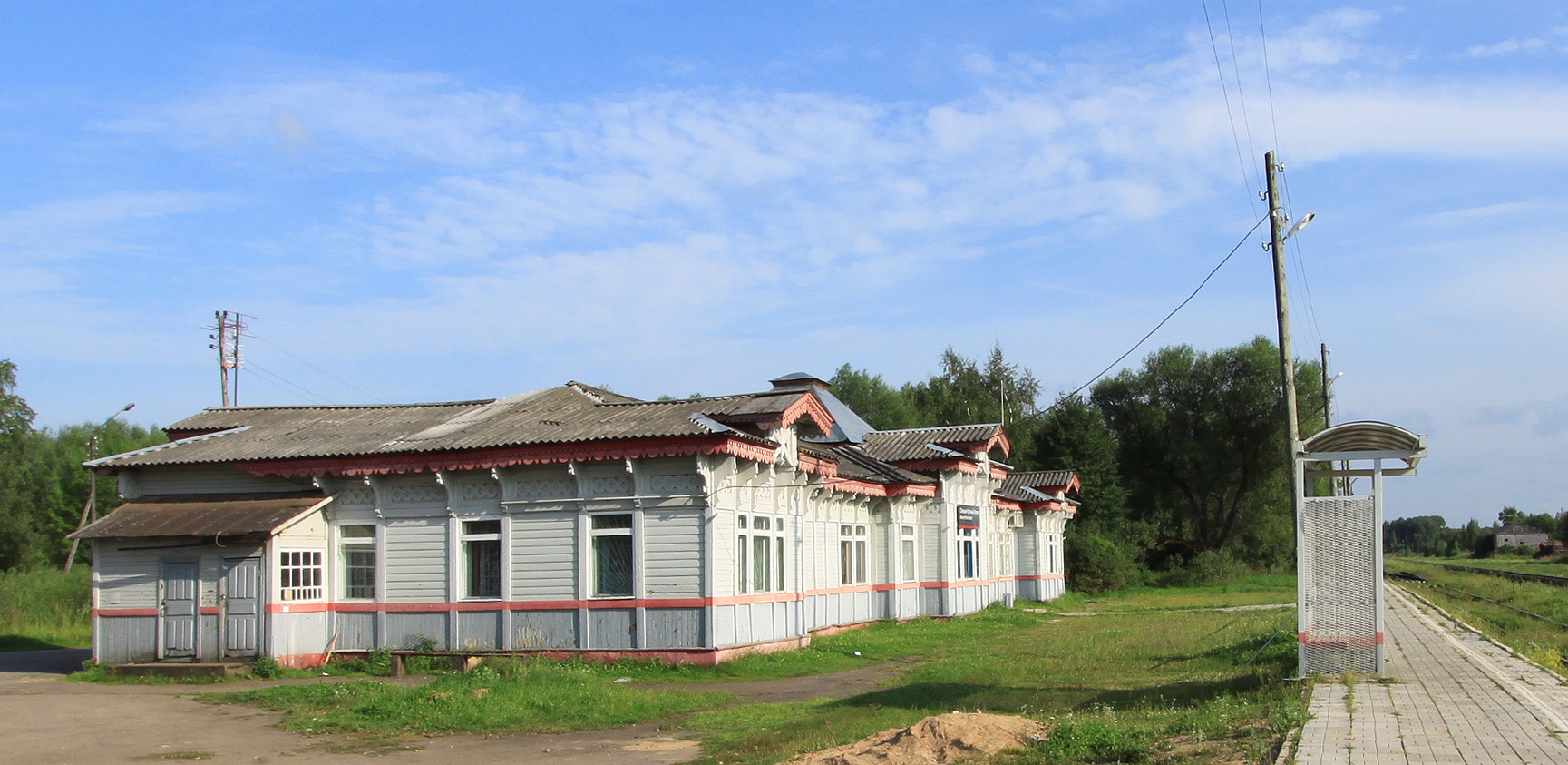

General information
- Location: Krasny Kholm; Tver Oblast; Russia
- Coordinates: 58°02′47″N 37°06′26″E
- Owner: Russian Railways
- Operator: Russian Railways
- Line: Oktyabrskaya Railway

Other information
- Station code: 051303

History
- Opened: 1899
Location

Krasny Kholm railway station (Russian: станция Красный Холм) is a railway station located in Krasny Kholm, Tver Oblast, Russia. It is part of the Oktyabrskaya Railway, on the main line connecting Savyolovo railway station and Vesyegonsk railway station.

== History ==
The wooden station dates from 1899, and has been preserved in its original form. The station's water tower dates from the same period, and has also been preserved. The station was originally built to serve the branch line that was extended from Sonkovo railway station to Krasny Kholm, as part of the Rybinsk-Pskov-Vindava railway. The line was later extended to Ovinishchi, and then to Vesyegonsk railway station in 1919. The Mologsky passage from Saint Petersburg was then extended to Ovinishchi, creating a reserve railway link between Saint Petersburg and Moscow. The pre-revolutionary station building has the status of an object of cultural heritage of regional significance.

== Services ==
The station has a ticket office, which opens half an hour before the arrival of a train, and a waiting room, which is open all day. Suburban trains between Sonkovo and Pestovo, and between Sonkovo and Vesyegonsk, pass through the station. These provide a link to direct trains from Vesyegonsk and Pestovo to Moscow, and from Vesyegonsk to Saint Petersburg. Sonkovo station provides transit links to trains to Savyolovo, Uglich, Bologoye, and Rybinsk, while Pestovo links to a service to Khvoynaya.
