= Krasny Kholm =

Krasny Kholm (Russian: Красный Холм, lit. 'Red Hill') is the name of several inhabited localities in Russia.

Urban localities

- Krasny Kholm, Krasnokholmsky District, Tver Oblast, a town of district significance in Krasnokholmsky District of Tver Oblast

Rural localities

- Krasny Kholm, Republic of Bashkortostan, a selo in Krasnokholmsky Selsoviet of Kaltasinsky District of the Republic of Bashkortostan
- Krasny Kholm, Kaluga Oblast, a village in Baryatinsky District of Kaluga Oblast
- Krasny Kholm, Kemerovo Oblast, a settlement in Kostenkovskaya Rural Territory of Novokuznetsky District of Kemerovo Oblast
- Krasny Kholm, Kostroma Oblast, a village in Varakinskoye Settlement of Sharyinsky District of Kostroma Oblast
- Krasny Kholm, Kurgan Oblast, a village in Bolshevistsky Selsoviet of Shumikhinsky District of Kurgan Oblast
- Krasny Kholm, Leningrad Oblast, a logging depot settlement under the administrative jurisdiction of Kamennogorskoye Settlement Municipal Formation in Vyborgsky District of Leningrad Oblast
- Krasny Kholm, Moscow Oblast, a village in Nudolskoye Rural Settlement of Klinsky District of Moscow Oblast
- Krasny Kholm, Orenburg Oblast, a settlement in Mikheyevsky Selsoviet of Severny District of Orenburg Oblast
- Krasny Kholm, Pskov Oblast, a village in Loknyansky District of Pskov Oblast
- Krasny Kholm, Shatsky District, Ryazan Oblast, a selo in Yambirnsky Rural Okrug of Shatsky District of Ryazan Oblast
- Krasny Kholm, Shilovsky District, Ryazan Oblast, a selo in Krasnokholmsky Rural Okrug of Shilovsky District of Ryazan Oblast
- Krasny Kholm, Smolensk Oblast, a village in Kaydakovskoye Rural Settlement of Vyazemsky District of Smolensk Oblast
- Krasny Kholm, Chernsky District, Tula Oblast, a settlement in Turgenevskaya Rural Administration of Chernsky District of Tula Oblast
- Krasny Kholm, Volovsky District, Tula Oblast, a village in Nikitsky Rural Okrug of Volovsky District of Tula Oblast
- Krasny Kholm, Zubtsovsky District, Tver Oblast, a village in Knyazhyegorskoye Rural Settlement of Zubtsovsky District of Tver Oblast
- Krasny Kholm, Vologda Oblast, a village in Zheleznodorozhny Selsoviet of Sheksninsky District of Vologda Oblast
- Krasny Kholm, Pervomaysky District, Yaroslavl Oblast, a village in Uritsky Rural Okrug of Pervomaysky District of Yaroslavl Oblast
- Krasny Kholm, Yaroslavsky District, Yaroslavl Oblast, a settlement in Nekrasovsky Rural Okrug of Yaroslavsky District of Yaroslavl Oblast
