= Pestovsky =

Pestovsky (masculine), Pestovskaya (feminine), or Pestovskoye (neuter) may refer to:

- Pestovsky District, a district of Novgorod Oblast, Russia
- Pestovskoye Urban Settlement, a municipal formation which the town of district significance of Pestovo in Pestovsky District of Novgorod Oblast, Russia is incorporated as
- Pestovsky (inhabited locality) (Pestovskaya, Pestovskoye), several rural localities in Russia
