= Vesyegonsk =

Town in Tver Oblast, Russia

Vesyegonsk Весьегонск
- Town
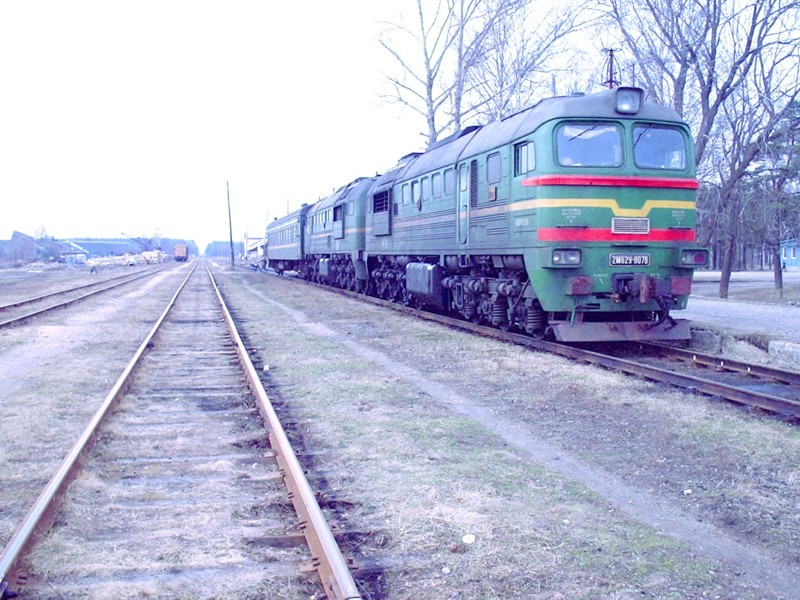
- Vesyegonsk railway station

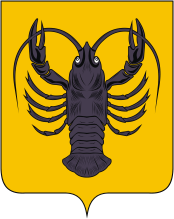
- Coat of arms
- Interactive map of Vesyegonsk
- Location of Vesyegonsk Vesyegonsk (Tver Oblast)
- Coordinates: 58°41′N 37°15′E
- Country: Russia
- Federal subject: Tver Oblast
- Administrative district: Vesyegonsky District
- Urban settlementSelsoviet: Vesyegonsk
- First mentioned: 15th century
- Town status since: December 1953
- Elevation: 108 m (354 ft)

Population (2010 Census)
  - Total: 7,329
  - Estimate (2021): 6,330 (−13.6%)

Administrative status
  - Capital of: Vesyegonsky District, Vesyegonsk Urban Settlement

Municipal status
  - Municipal district: Vesyegonsky Municipal District
  - Urban settlement: Vesyegonsk Urban Settlement
  - Capital of: Vesyegonsky Municipal District, Vesyegonsk Urban Settlement
- Time zone: UTC+3 (MSK)
- Postal codes: 171720, 171721
- OKTMO ID: 28510000001

Vesyegonsk (Russian: Весьего́нск) is a town and the administrative center of Vesyegonsky District in Tver Oblast, Russia. Population: 7,329 (2010 census); 8,662 (2002 census); 9,574 (1989 Soviet census).

The historical part of Vesyegonsk lies under the waters of the Rybinsk Reservoir. It was previously known as Ves Yogonskaya (until 1776).

== History ==
The territory of modern Vesyegonsky District was originally populated by the Ves people, a Finnic tribe; the name of Vesyegonsk derives from the Ves. Vesyegonsk was first mentioned as Ves Yogonskaya in the 15th century. The settlement was located on the Mologa River, which was one of the main waterways from the Volga to the north of Russia. In the 18th century, after the Tikhvin Water System was constructed, Vesyegonsk was on the waterway connecting Moscow with St. Petersburg. However, the Tikhvin Water System eventually decayed and Vesyegonsk's importance declined as well.

In the course of the administrative reform carried out in 1708 by Peter the Great, the territory was included into Ingermanland Governorate (known since 1710 as St. Petersburg Governorate), but in 1727 it was transferred to Moscow Governorate. In 1775, Tver Viceroyalty was formed and in 1776 Vesyegonsky Uyezd was established as a part of Tver Viceroyalty. At the same time, Vesyegonsk was granted town status and became the seat of the uyezd. In 1796, the viceroyalty was transformed into Tver Governorate and the uyezd was abolished. In 1803, Vesyegonsky Uyezd was re-established. On April 25, 1921, Vesyegonsky Uyezd was transferred to newly established Rybinsk Governorate. In February 1923, Rybinsk Governorate was abolished and the uyezd was transferred back to Tver Governorate on February 6, 1923.

On July 12, 1929, the governorates and uyezds were abolished. Vesyegonsky District, with the administrative center in Vesyegonsk, was established within Bezhetsk Okrug of Moscow Oblast. On July 23, 1930, the okrugs were abolished and the districts were directly subordinated to the oblast. On January 29, 1935, Vesyegonsky District was transferred to newly established Kalinin Oblast. In 1939, the construction of the Rybinsk Reservoir started and large areas in the lower course of the Mologa were slated to be submerged under water. Vesyegonsk in particular was to be completely submerged. Due to this, the town was moved 0.5 kilometers (0.31 mi) from the original location and downgraded in status to that of an urban-type settlement; the administrative center of the district was moved to the selo of Ovinishche. On April 26, 1940, Vesyegonsky District was abolished and on March 3, 1949, it was re-established; Vesyegonsk became the administrative center of the district again. In December 1953, Vesyegonsk was once again granted town status.

== Administrative and municipal status ==
Within the framework of administrative divisions, Vesyegonsk serves as the administrative center of Vesyegonsky District. As an administrative division, it is incorporated within Vesyegonsky District as Vesyegonsk Urban Settlement. As a municipal division, this administrative unit also has urban settlement status and is a part of Vesyegonsky Municipal District.

== Economy ==
=== Industry ===
There are enterprises of timber and food industries in Vesyegonsk.

=== Transportation ===
Vesyegonsk railway station is a terminal railway station on the railway which runs to Ovinishchi. There, it connects to the railway running between Moscow and Mga via Krasny Kholm and Pestovo.

Vesyegonsk is connected by roads with Ustyuzhna and with Tver via Krasny Kholm and Bezhetsk. There are also local roads. There is bus traffic originating from Vesyegonsk.

== Culture and recreation ==
After Vesyegonsk was relocated, only two streets from the original town survived. There are five cultural heritage monuments of local significance in Vesyegonsk. These include the monuments to soldiers fallen in World War II, the tomb of the early Bolshevik, and the ensemble of two churches—the Kazan Church (1811) and the Trinity Church (1868).

Vesyegonsk is home to the Vesyegonsk District Museum, which holds expositions on local history.
