= Pavel Gusterin =

Russian orientalist

Pavel Vyacheslavovich Gusterin (Russian: Павел Вячеславович Густерин; born April 16, 1972) is a Russian orientalist.

== Education ==
Pavel Gusterin is a graduate of the Tver State University (Department of History; 1994), the Institute of Asian and African Countries at the Moscow State University named after Mikhail Vasilyevich Lomonosov (Department of Arab Studies; 2001), and the Diplomatic Academy of the Ministry of Foreign Affairs of the Russian Federation (Department of International relations; 2011).

== Biography ==
Pavel Gusterin was born on 16 April 1972 in Kimry, the Tver region, Russia.

In 2001–2003, he was an editor of the Publishing house «Восточная литература» (“Oriental Literature”) at the Russian Academy of Sciences.

After returning from his business trip to Yemen (2003–2005) he published a number of articles in the journals «Азия и Африка сегодня» (“Asia and Africa Today”), «Вопросы истории» (“Historical Issues”), «Высшее образование сегодня» (“Higher Education Today”), «Дипломатическая служба» (“Diplomatic Service”), «Исламоведение» (“Islamic Studies”), «Мир музея» (“World of Museum”), «Новая и новейшая история» (“New and Contemporary History”), «Православный Палестинский сборник» (“Orthodox Palestine Collection”), “Al-Moutawasset”, etc., as well as the reference book «Йеменская Республика и её города» (“Republic of Yemen and Its Towns”, Moscow, 2006), the encyclopaedic reference book «Города Арабского Востока» (“Towns of Arab East”, Moscow, 2007), and collection of essays "Первый российский востоковед Дмитрий Кантемир / First Russian Orientalist Dmitry Kantemir" (Moscow, 2008), etc.

In 2006–2013, he was a researcher of the Centre for Arab and Islamic Studies of the Institute of Oriental Studies of the Russian Academy of Sciences.

Since 2013, he is a researcher of the Centre for Asian and Middle-East Studies of the Russian Institute for Strategic Studies.

== Selected bibliography ==
- Йеменская республика и её города. М., 2006. ISBN 5-7133-1270-4
- Города Арабского Востока. М., 2007. ISBN 978-5-478-00729-4
- Первый российский востоковед Дмитрий Кантемир / First Russian Orientalist Dmitry Kantemir. М., 2008. ISBN 978-5-7873-0436-7
- Советская разведка на Ближнем и Среднем Востоке в 1920—30-х годах. Саарбрюккен, 2014. ISBN 978-3-659-51691-7
- The Middle East: Past and Present. Part 1. Saarbrücken, 2015. ISBN 978-3-659-66401-4
