= Kimry =

Town in Tver Oblast, Russia

Kimry Кимры
- Town of oblast significance
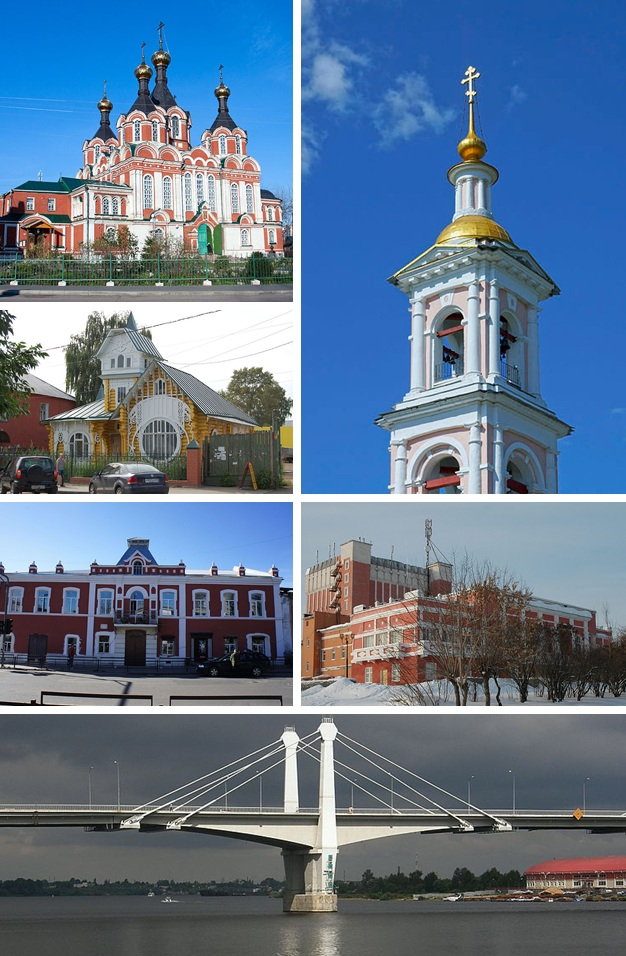
- Clockwise from top: Cathedral of the Transfiguration, Church of the Ascension, Kimry drama and comedy theatre, Kimry Bridge over Volga, Peasant house(?), Luzhin wooden house

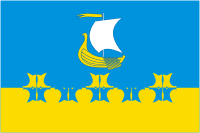
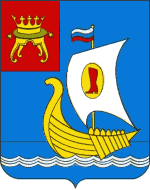
- Flag Coat of arms
- Interactive map of Kimry
- Location of Kimry Kimry (Tver Oblast)
- Coordinates: 56°52′N 37°21′E
- Country: Russia
- Federal subject: Tver Oblast
- First mentioned: 1546
- Town status since: 1917
- Elevation: 219 m (719 ft)

Population (2010 Census)
  - Total: 49,628
  - Estimate (2025): 38,441 (−22.5%)
  - Rank: 322nd in 2010

Administrative status
  - Subordinated to: Kimry Okrug
  - Capital of: Kimrsky District, Kimry Okrug

Municipal status
  - Urban okrug: Kimry Urban Okrug
  - Capital of: Kimry Urban Okrug, Kimrsky Municipal District
- Time zone: UTC+3 (MSK)
- Postal code: 171500–171508
- OKTMO ID: 28726000001
- Website: adm-kimry.ru

Kimry (Russian: Ки́мры), formerly Kimra (Кимра), is a town in the south of Tver Oblast, Russia, located on the Volga River at its confluence with the Kimrka River, 133 kilometers (83 mi) to the east of Tver. Population: 49,628 (2010 census); 53,650 (2002 census); 61,535 (1989 Soviet census).

== History ==
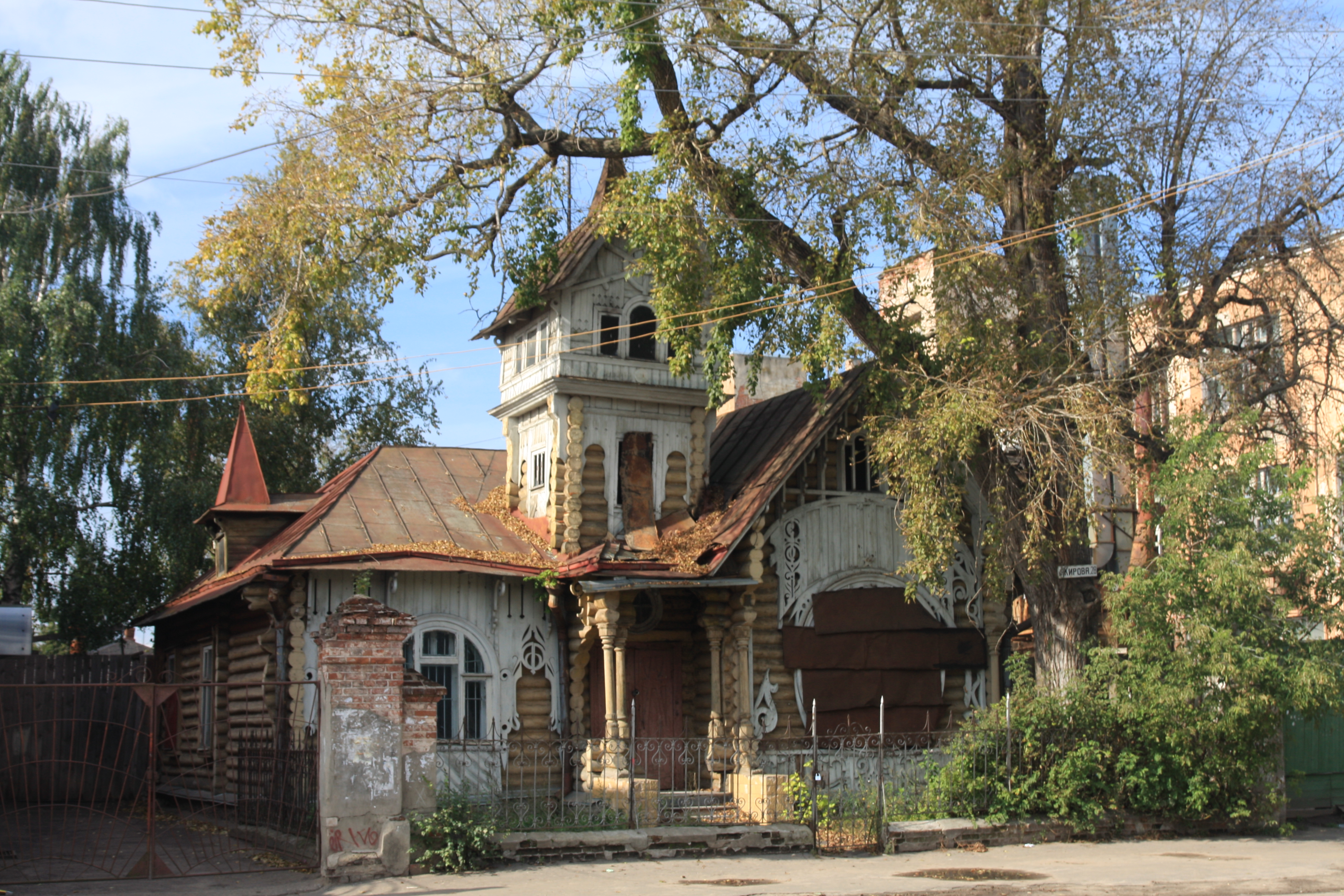
The Luzhin House, wooden modern style, before reconstruction

The town was known as Kimra until the beginning of the 20th century; the name is probably of Finnic or Baltic origin. It was first mentioned in 1546 as a selo belonging to Ivan the Terrible. It belonged to Russian Tsars until 1677 and then was given to the Saltykov family. In 1847, the inhabitants bought themselves out, and Kimra quickly developed into a busy shoemaking and trading village on the left bank of the Volga (a boot appears on the town's coat of arms). Théophile Gautier wrote in his Voyage en Russie (1867): "Kimra est célèbre pour ses bottes comme Ronda pour ses guêtres" (Kimra is famous for its shoes as Ronda for its gaiters). The district on the right bank of the Volga, known as Savyolovo, started to develop in 1901, when a railway connected the place to Moscow. Kimry was granted town status in 1917. A number of old churches and other buildings still exist in the town.

In the 18th century, Kimra was included into Moscow Governorate. In 1775 it was transferred to newly established Tver Viceroyalty. In 1796, the Viceroyalty was abolished and transformed into Tver Governorate. On December 30, 1918 Kimrsky Uyezd with the center in Kimry was established. On 12 August 1929, Tver Governorate was abolished, and the area was transferred to Moscow Oblast. Uyezds were abolished as well, and Kimrsky District, with the administrative center in Kimry, was established within Kimry Okrug of Moscow Oblast. On July 23, 1930, the okrugs were abolished, and the districts were directly subordinated to the oblast. On January 29, 1935 Kalinin Oblast was established, and Kimrsky District was transferred to Kalinin Oblast. In 1990, Kalinin Oblast was renamed Tver Oblast.

== Administrative and municipal status ==
Within the framework of administrative divisions, Kimry serves as the administrative center of Kimrsky District, even though it is not a part of it. As an administrative division, it is incorporated separately as Kimry Okrug—an administrative unit with the status equal to that of the districts. As a municipal division, Kimry Okrug is incorporated as Kimry Urban Okrug.

== Economy ==
=== Industry ===
Kimry is an industrial town, with several enterprises of manufacturing industry (machines and equipment for manufacturing industry), timber industry (furniture), as well as production of shoes, clothing, and food.

- Savyolovo Engineering Plant SMZ (Mashinostroitelny Zavod)

=== Transportation ===
The town is served by the Kimry Airport. There are no passenger flights.

A railway connecting Moscow with Kashin and further with Sonkovo and Saint-Petersburg passes Kimry. There is a regular suburban passenger traffic between Moscow and Savyolovo, and a regular infrequent traffic between Savyolovo and Kashin. Savyolovo railway station is the northern terminus of the Savyolovsky suburban railway line.

Paved roads connect Kimry with Tver, Taldom, Kashin, and Kalyazin.

The Volga is navigable, but there is no passenger navigation.

== Culture and recreation ==
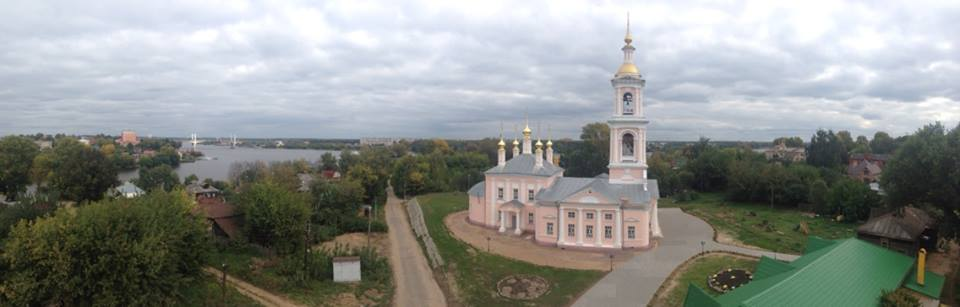
The Ascension Church

Kimry contains one cultural heritage monuments of federal significance and additionally eighty-three objects classified as cultural and historical heritage of local significance. The federal monument is the Ascension Church, built in 1813. Kimry preserved many of the pre-1917 buildings, many of which are protected.

There is a local museum in Kimry. It has expositions on local history, shoe industry, as well as has a memorial room of the aircraft designer Andrei Tupolev, born in a village near Kimry.

== Notable people ==
Kimry is the birthplace of aircraft designer Andrei Tupolev (1888), writer Alexander Fadeyev (1901), orientalist Pavel Gusterin (1972), and judoka Ihar Makarau (1979).

== Twin towns – sister cities ==
Kimry is twinned with:

- Kornwestheim, Germany
