= Kimry Airport =

Borki
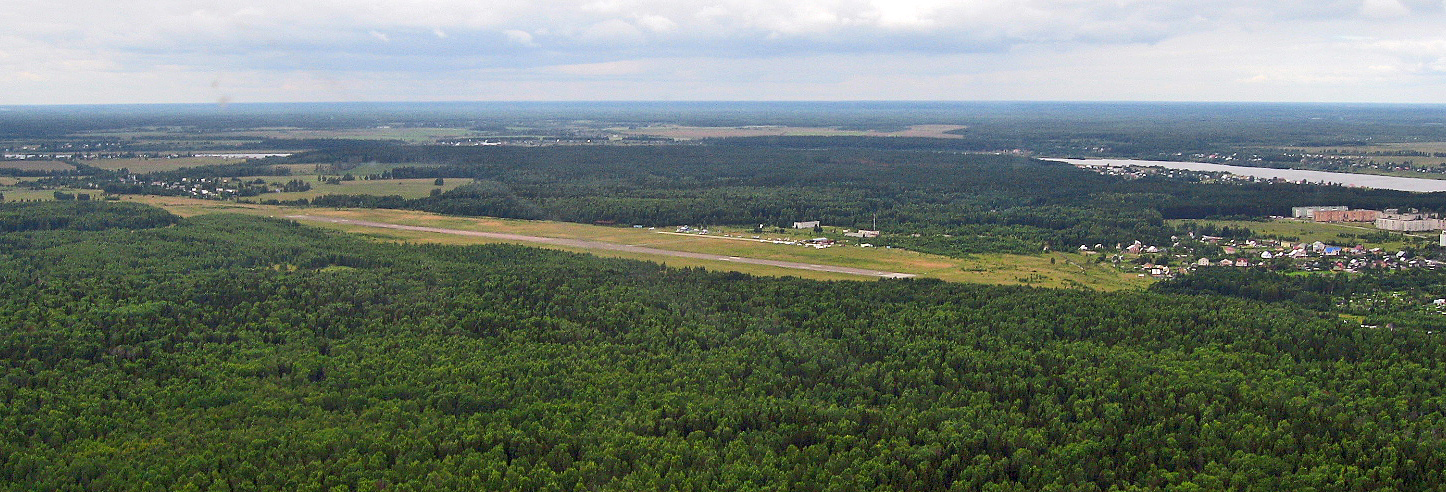
- IATA: none; ICAO: UUEI

Summary
- Airport type: Public
- Location: Kimry
- Elevation AMSL: 449 ft / 127 m
- Coordinates: 56°47′54″N 37°19′48″E
- Website: www.aero-club.ru/borki.php
- Interactive map of Borki

Runways
Direction	Length		Surface
Direction	ft	m	Surface
06/24	4,642	1,415	Asphalt

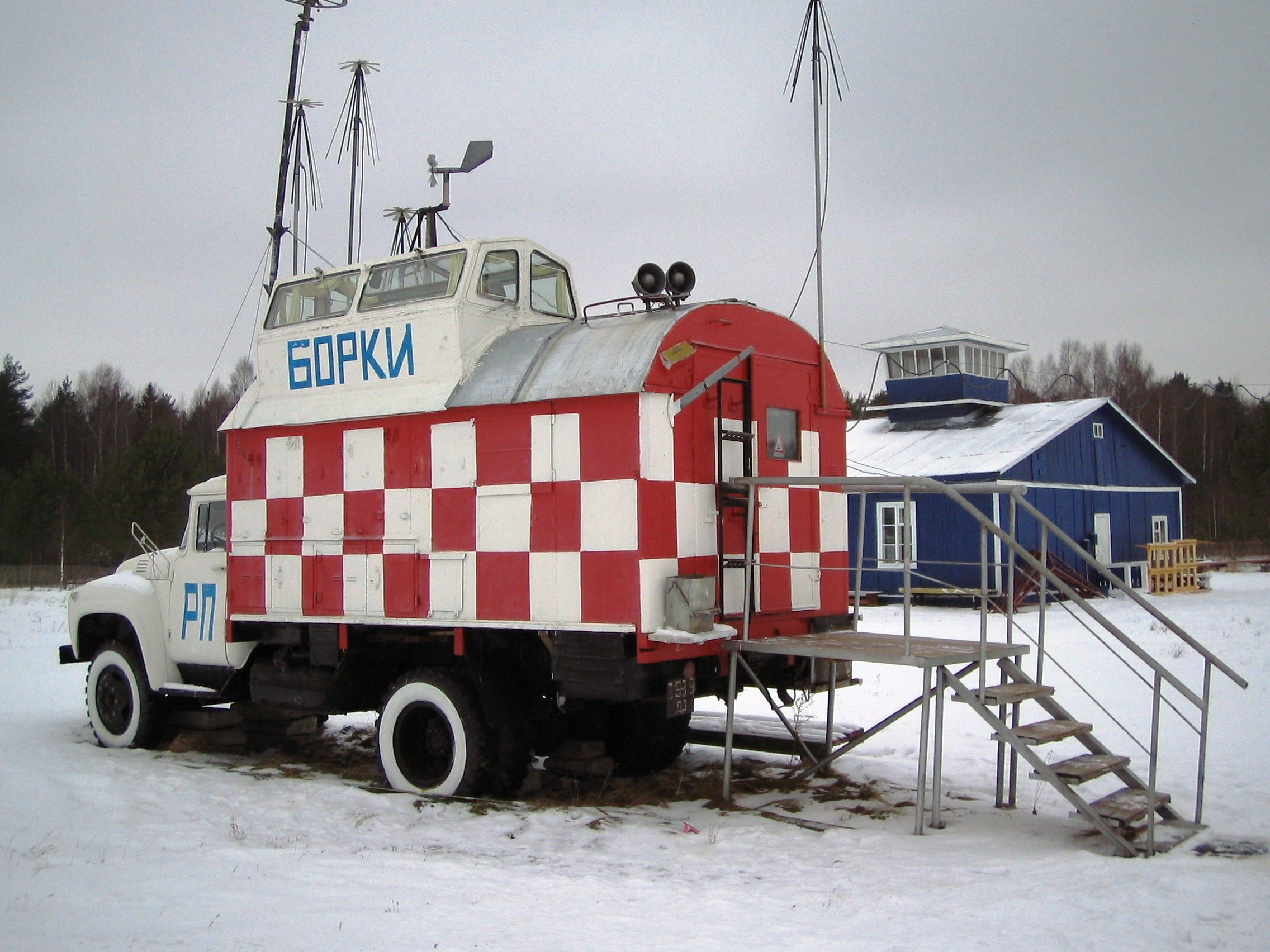

Kimry (also given as Borki, Kletino) (ICAO: UUEI) is an airport in Russia located 8 km to the south of Kimry. It is a small utility airfield and a base for Yak-12/18/52, An-2/26 and L-410 aircraft.

== See also ==
- List of airports in Russia
