= Petrozavodsk Railway Division =

Petrozavodsk Railway subdivision is a subdivision in the October Railway, Russia. It includes most parts of Southern Karelia, with a total length of 1,915 kilometres (1,190 mi).
