= Krasny Kholm, Vologda Oblast =

Krasny Kholm Красный Холм
- Village
- Location within Vologda Oblast Location within Russia
- Coordinates: 59°10′N 38°20′E
- Country: Russia
- Region: Vologda Oblast
- District: Sheksninsky District
- Time zone: UTC+3:00

Krasny Kholm (Russian: Красный Холм) is a rural locality (a village) in Zheleznodorozhnoye Rural Settlement, Sheksninsky District, Vologda Oblast, Russia. The population was 20 as of 2002.

== Geography ==
Krasny Kholm is located 20 km southwest of Sheksna (the district's administrative centre) by road. Chetverikovo is the nearest rural locality.
