= Pestovsky (inhabited locality) =

Name of several Russian rural localities

Pestovsky (Russian: Пестовский; masculine), Pestovskaya (Пестовская; feminine), or Pestovskoye (Пестовское; neuter) is the name of several rural localities in Russia:

- Pestovsky (rural locality), a settlement in Kondukovskaya Rural Administration of Uzlovsky District of Tula Oblast
- Pestovskaya, Kirov Oblast, a village in Griboshinsky Rural Okrug of Luzsky District of Kirov Oblast
- Pestovskaya, Moscow Oblast, a village in Dmitrovskoye Rural Settlement of Shatursky District of Moscow Oblast
