= Krasny Kholm, Republic of Bashkortostan =

Krasny Kholm Красный Холм
- Selo
- Location within Bashkortostan Location within Russia
- Coordinates: 56°00′N 55°02′E
- Country: Russia
- Region: Bashkortostan
- District: Kaltasinsky District
- Time zone: UTC+5:00

Krasny Kholm (Russian: Красный Холм) is a rural locality (a selo) in Krasnokholmsky Selsoviet, Kaltasinsky District, Bashkortostan, Russia. The population was 275 as of 2010. There are 6 streets.

== Geography ==
Krasny Kholm is located 19 km east of Kaltasy (the district's administrative centre) by road. Krasnokholmsky is the nearest rural locality.
