= Suda, Vologda Oblast =

Suda Суда
- Settlement
- Location within Vologda Oblast Location within Russia
- Coordinates: 59°10′N 37°27′E
- Country: Russia
- Region: Vologda Oblast
- District: Cherepovetsky District
- Time zone: UTC+3:00

Suda (Russian: Суда) is a rural locality (a settlement) and the administrative center of Sudskoye Rural Settlement, Cherepovetsky District, Vologda Oblast, Russia. The population was 5,692 as of 2002. There are 71 streets.

== Geography ==
Suda is located 39 km west of Cherepovets (the district's administrative centre) by road. Bolshoye Novo is the nearest rural locality. suda is a stream in Sanskrit
