= Narrow-gauge railway of KSM-2 factory =

Coordinates: 56.82180°N 36.06671°E

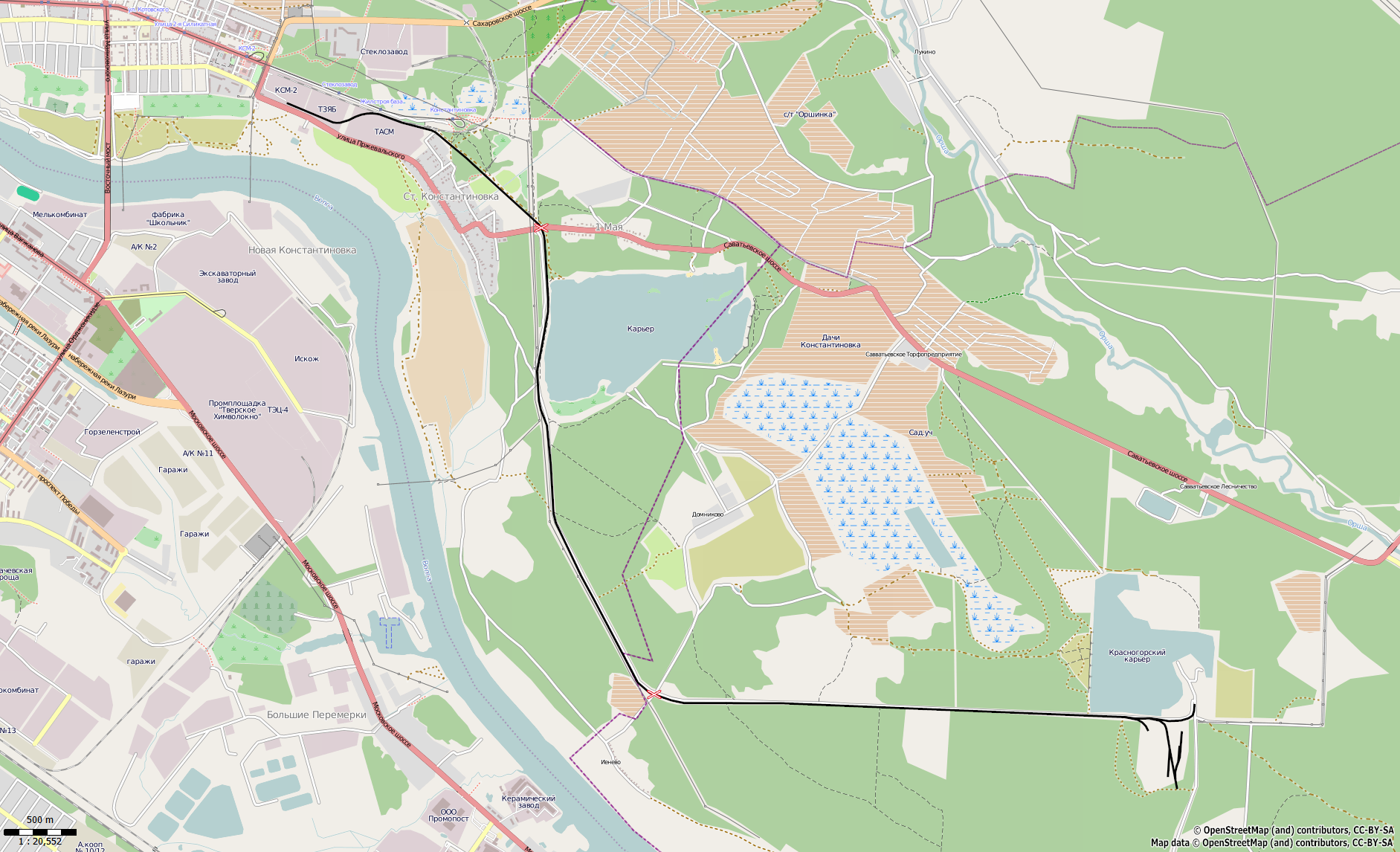

Overview
- Locale: Tver, Russia
- Termini: Tver
- Website: www.tksm2.ru

Service
- Type: Narrow-gauge railway
- Operator(s): ZAO «TKSM № 2»

History
- Opened: 1951

Technical
- Line length: 9 kilometres (5.6 mi)
- Track gauge: 750 mm (2 ft 5 1/2 in)

The narrow-gauge railway of KSM-2 factory is located in Tver, Russia. The railway was opened in 1951, and has a total length of 9 kilometres (5.6 mi), its track gauge is 750 mm (2 ft 5 1/2 in). It is used for the transportation of sand from the "Red Quarry" to the KSM-2 factory.

== Current status ==
The Tver plant of building materials No.2 located near the town of Tver. The first section of the 3 kilometres (1.9 mi) long railway was built in 1951. The main task of the narrow-gauge railway is the transportation of sand from the quarry to the KSM-2 factory. It runs on a daily basis, the speed of the train is 35–40 km/h (22–25 mph), the total length of the railway is 9 kilometres (5.6 mi).

== Rolling stock ==
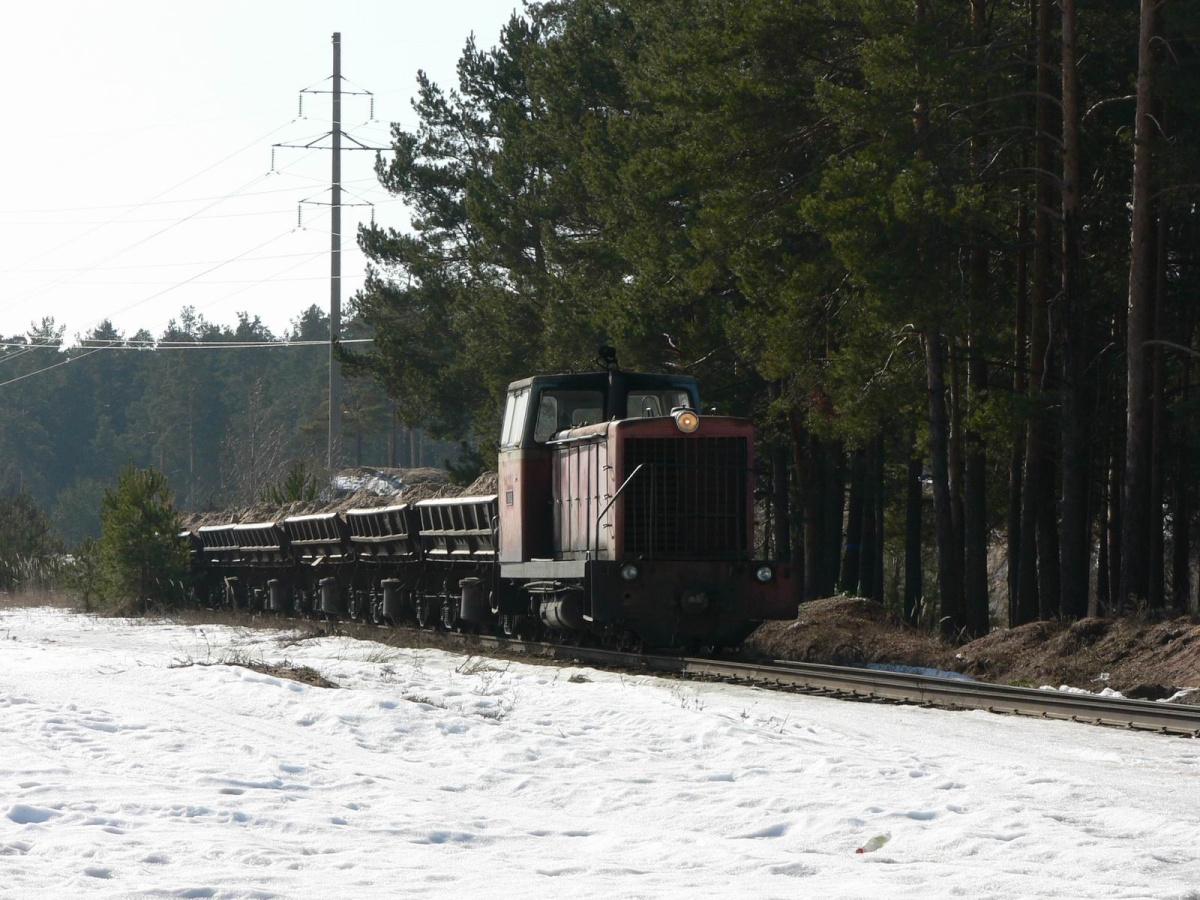
Loc TU7-1703 with freight train

=== Locomotives ===
- TU7 – No. 1231, 1703, 3155, 3215
- TU6A – No. 0635
- TU6D – No. 0037
- TU8P – No. 0001

=== Railroad car ===
- Side-tipping wagons
- Snow blower – TU6D

== Gallery ==
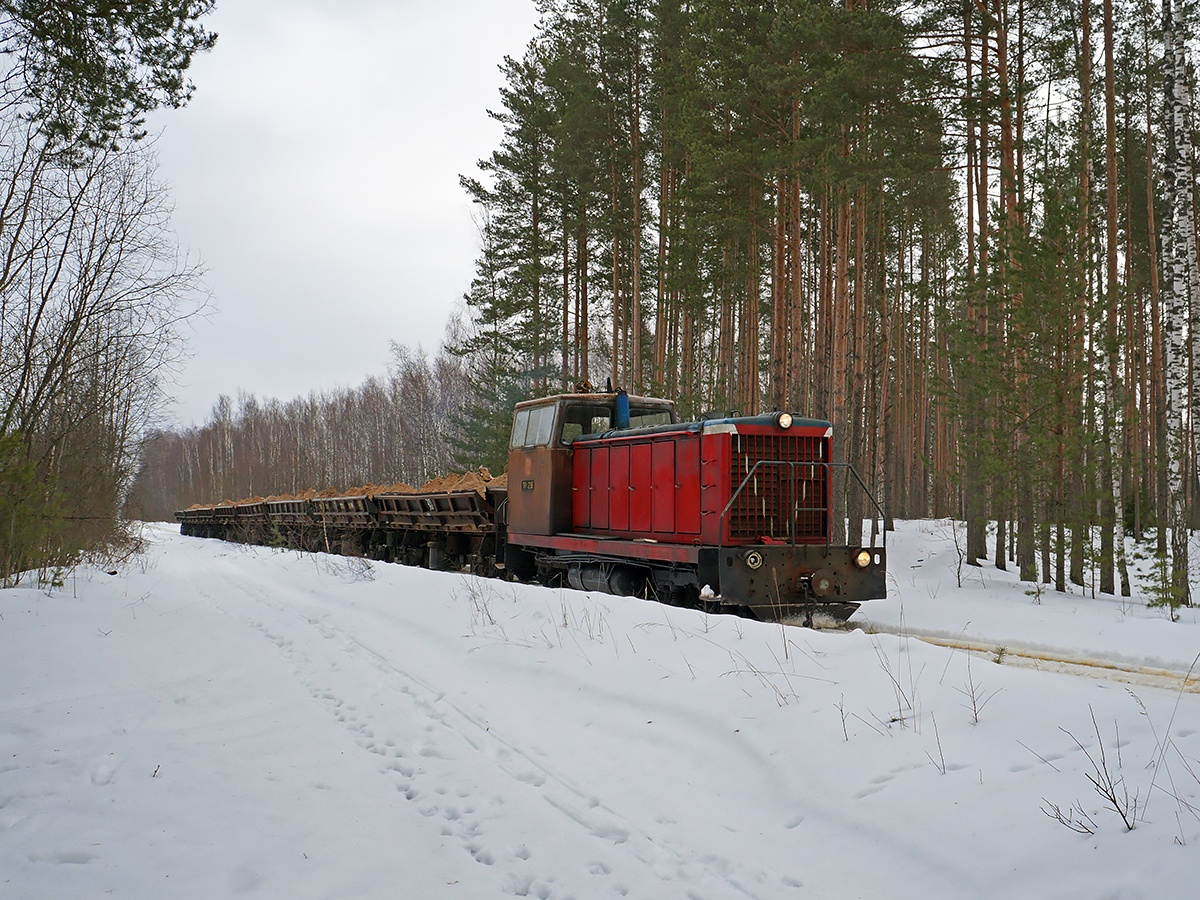
Locomotive TU7-1231 with freight train

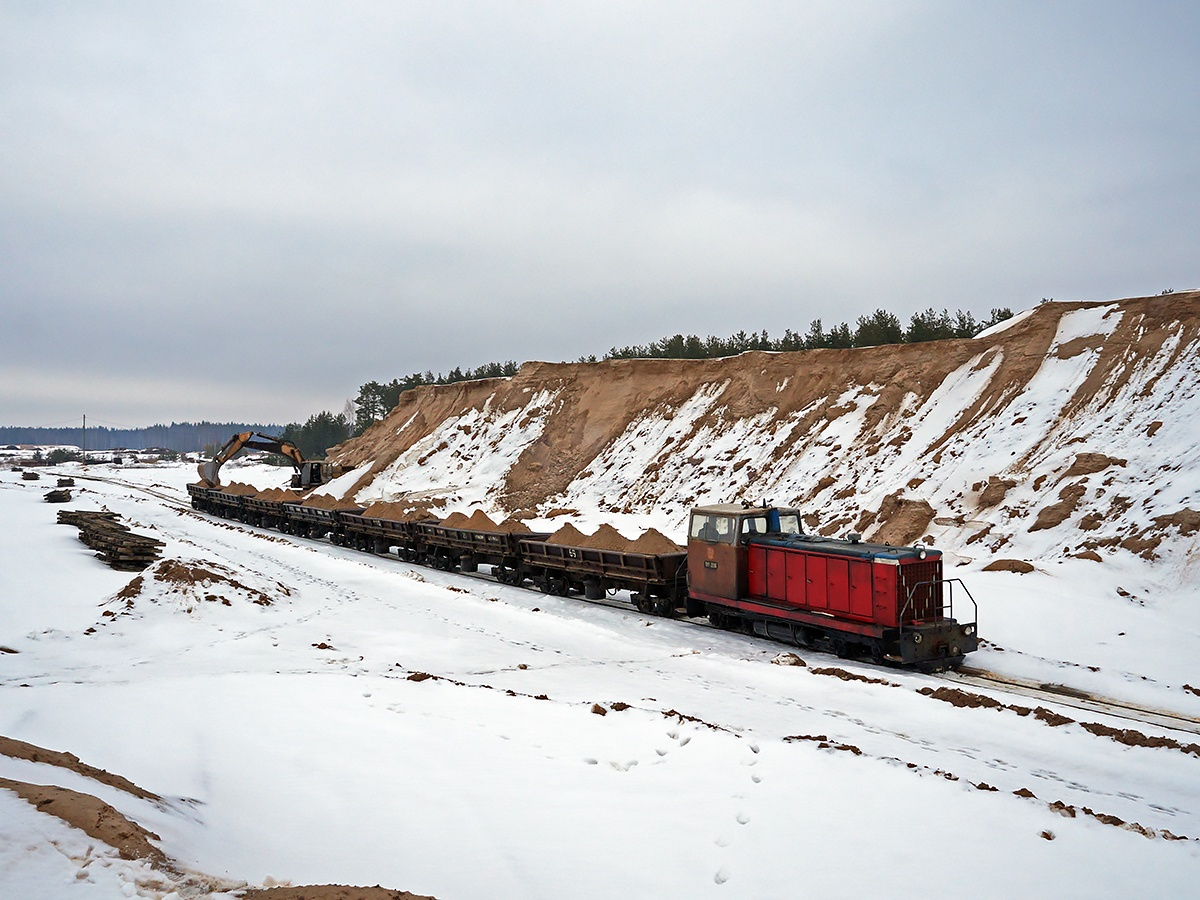
Locomotive TU7-1231 with freight train

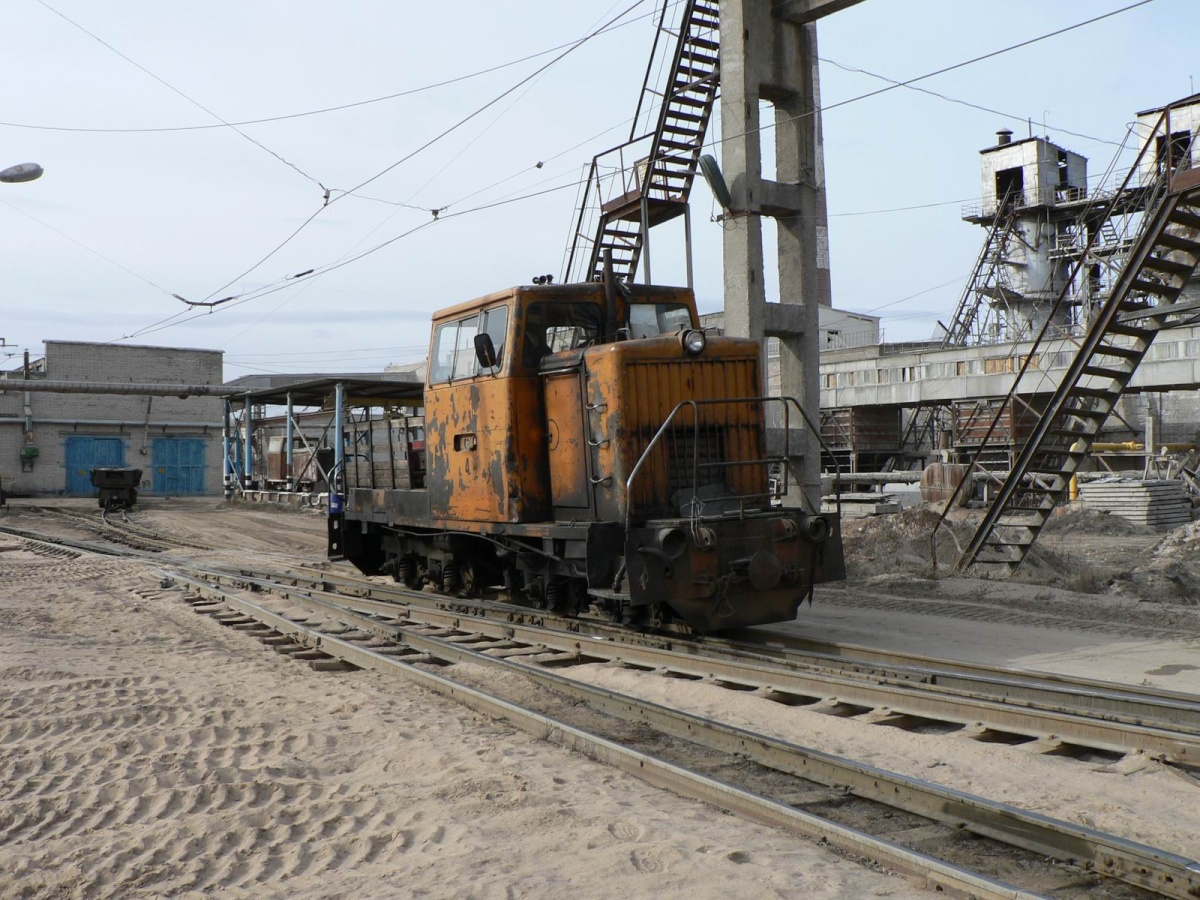
Locomotive TU6D-0037

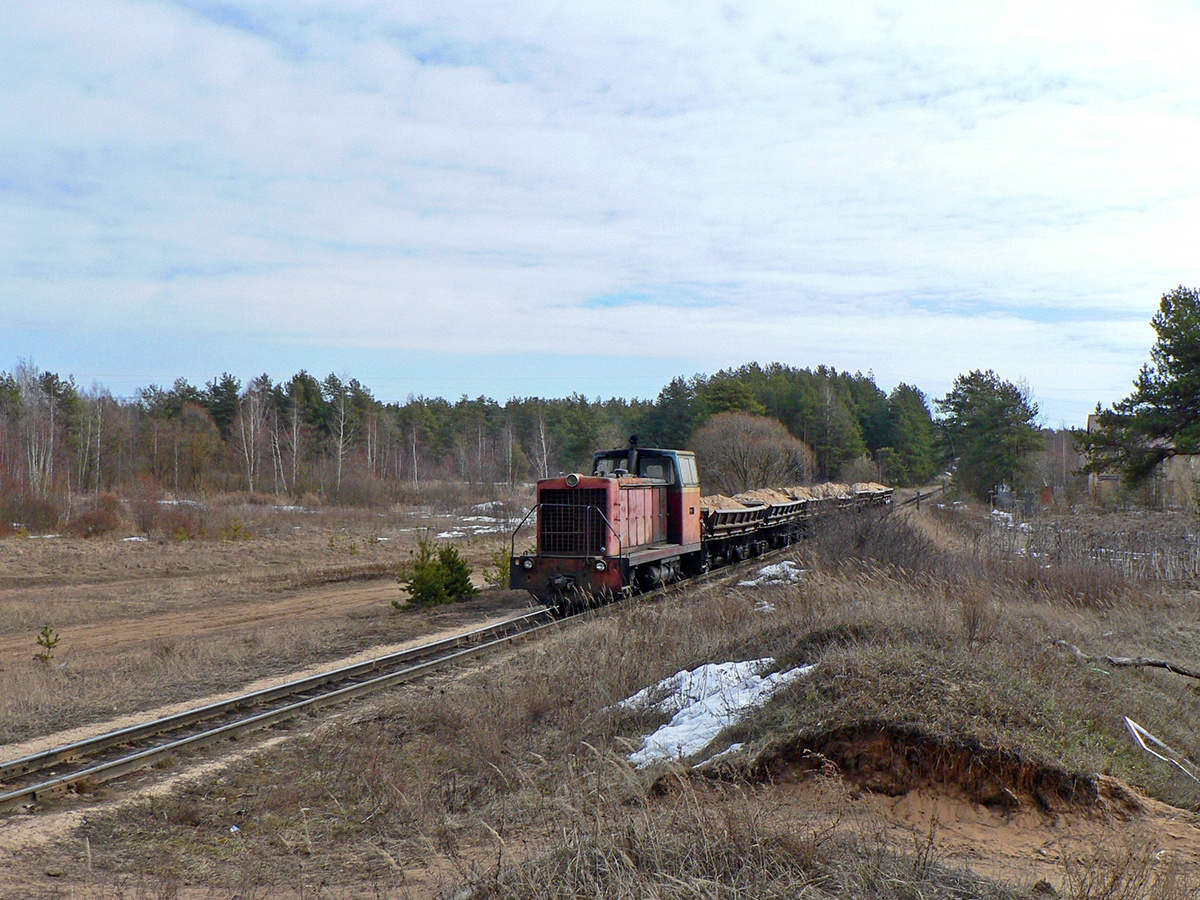
Locomotive TU7-1703 with freight train

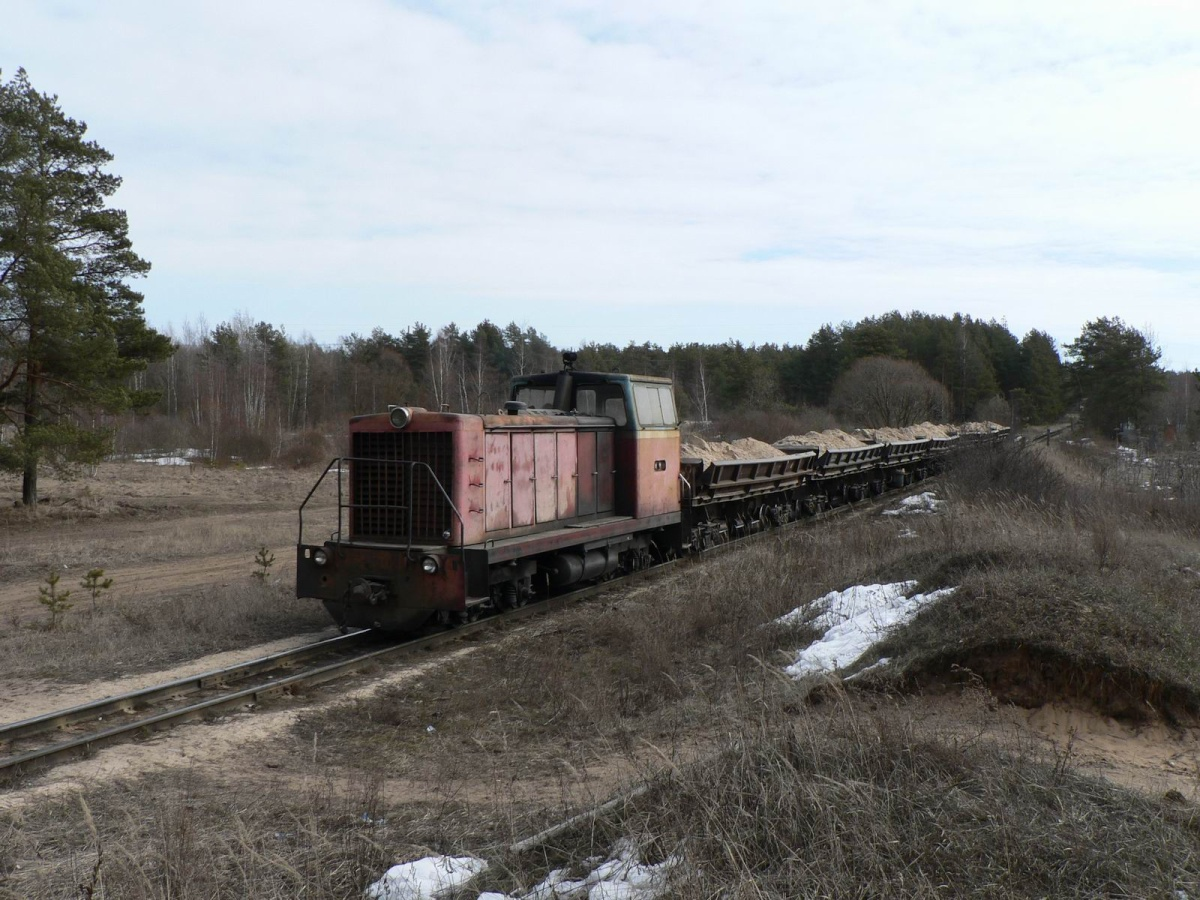
Locomotive TU7-1703 with freight train

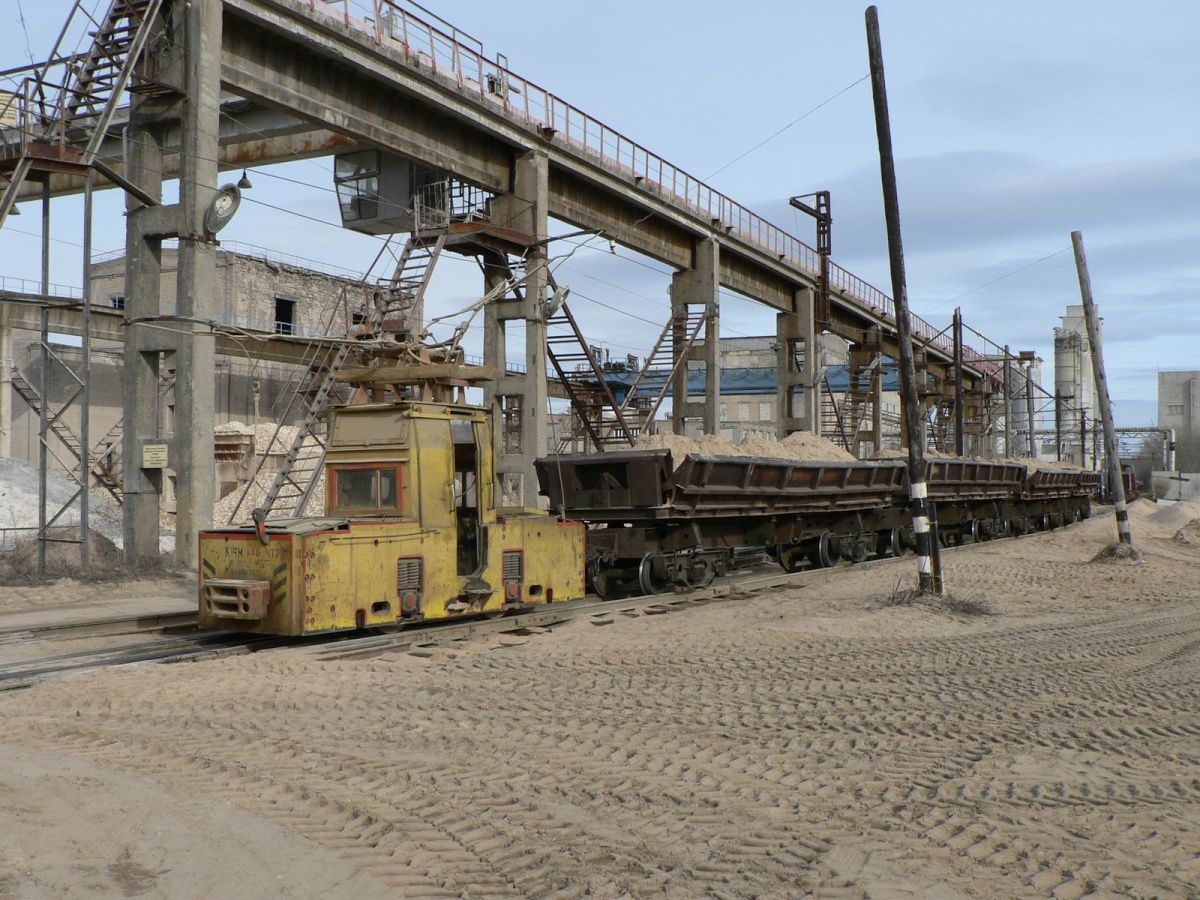
Electric locomotive K14m-091 with freight train

== See also ==
- Narrow-gauge railways in Russia
