= Sonkovo railway station =

Railway station in Sonkovo, Russia

Coordinates: 57°46′50″N 37°09′30″E

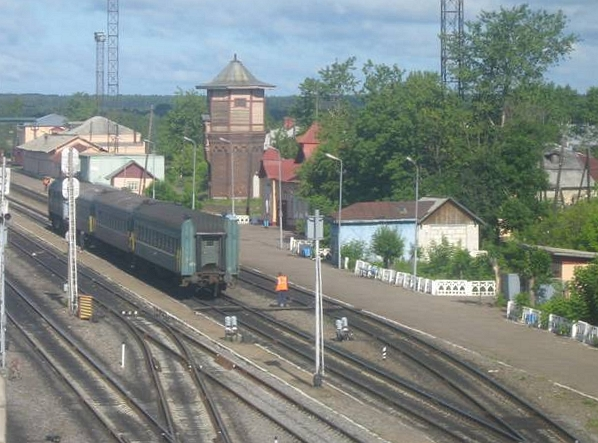

Sonkovo (Russian: Сонко́во) is a major freight and passenger railway station of the Moscow Region of the Oktyabrskaya Railway at the junction with the Northern Railway, with rail lines extending in four directions. The station is located in the urban-type settlement of Sonkovo of Tver Oblast, Russia The railway station and locomotive depot have played a key role in the development of the settlement.

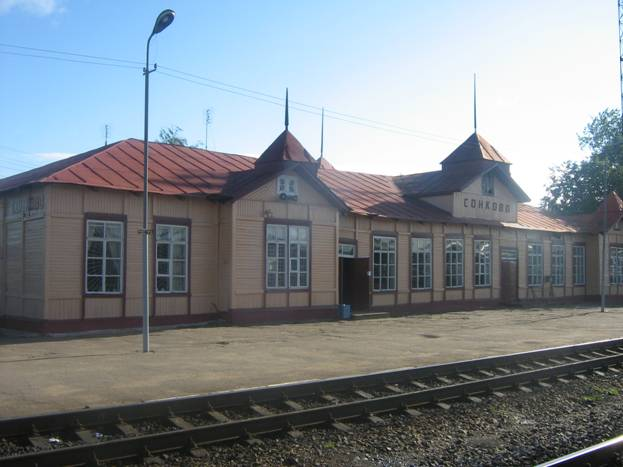
Sonkovo railway station

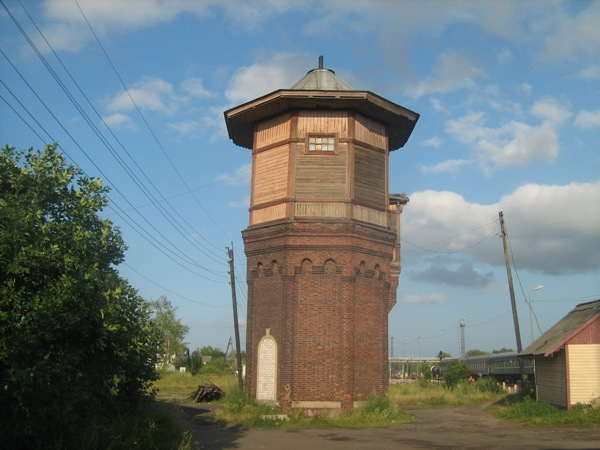
Water tower at station Sonkovo

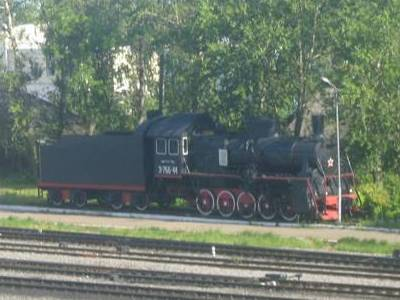
Steam locomotive Э-766-44

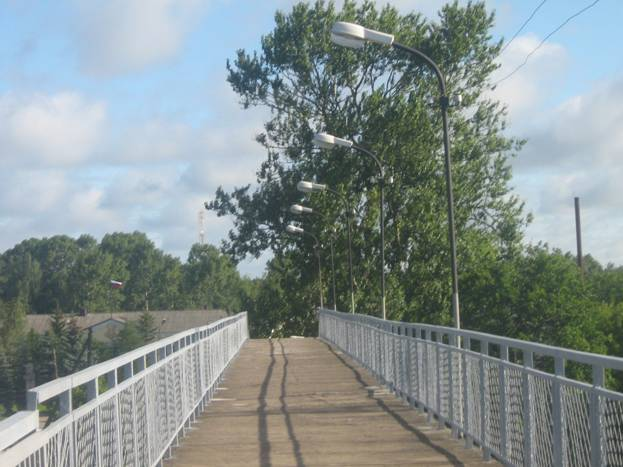
Bridge above tracks uniting northern and southern parts of Sonkovo
