= October Railway =

State-owned railway company in Russia

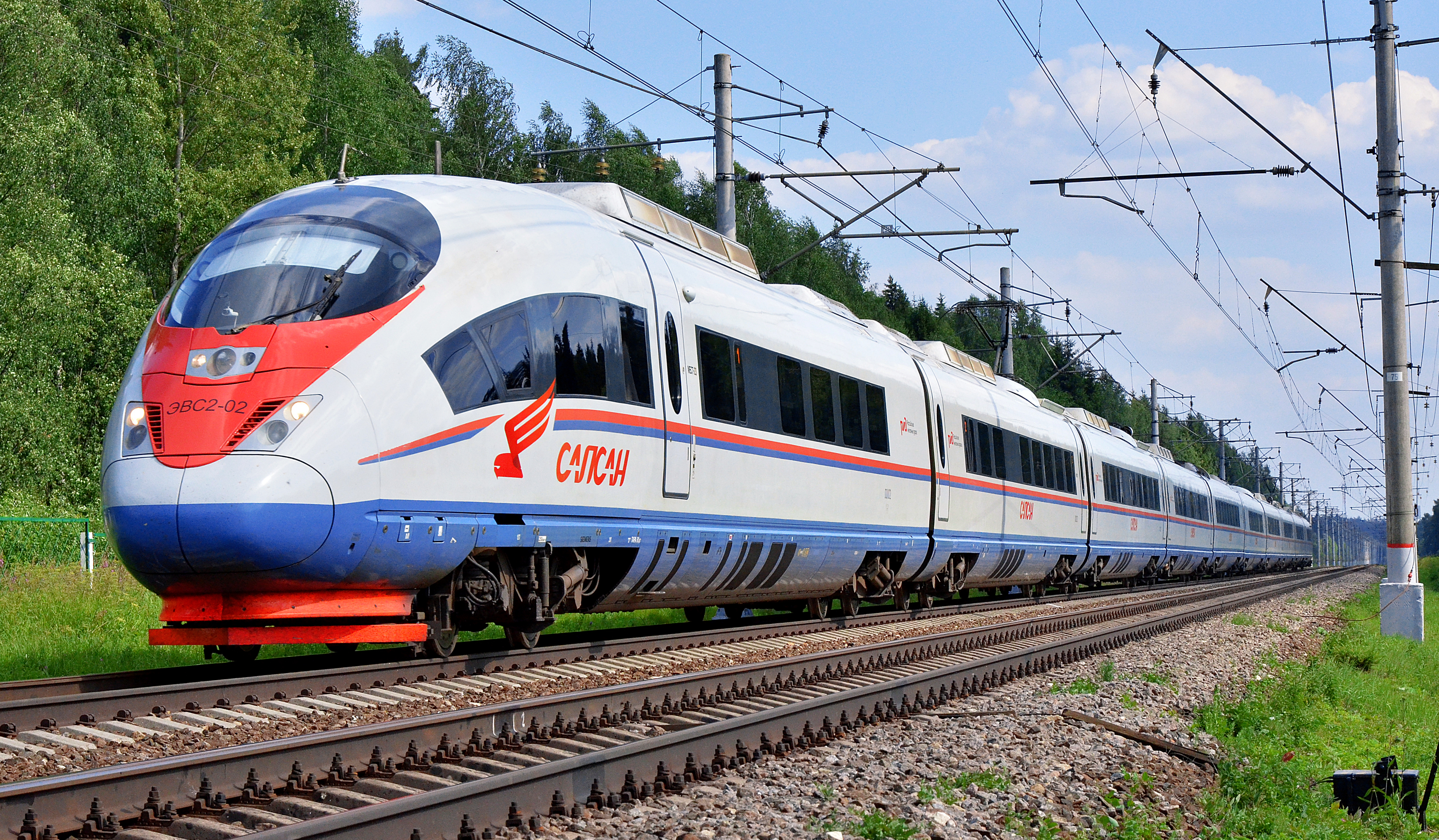
The Sapsan high speed train on the way from Moscow to St. Petersburg

Oktyabrskaya Railway or October Railway (Russian: Октябрьская железная дорога) is the subsidiary of RZD, servicing railway lines in the north-west of Russia. It stretches from Moscow's Leningrad Terminal in the south to Murmansk beyond the Arctic Circle in the north. The total length of the lines is over 10,000 km. The headquarters are located in Saint Petersburg.

The first railway in Russia connecting Saint Petersburg to Tsarskoye Selo, 27.9 km long, commissioned in 1837, is a part of the Oktyabrskaya Railway. So is the Moscow – Saint Petersburg Railway, the second oldest and one of the busiest lines in Russia, opened in 1851. Connecting Line, the first non-passenger line, is also included. The railway also includes the main line towards Tallinn (as far as the Estonian border), providing the track for GO Rail trains to Saint Petersburg.

== List of lines ==
- Moscow – Saint Petersburg Railway
- Saint Petersburg – Pavlovsk Railway
- Saint Petersburg – Vyborg Railway
- Saint Petersburg – Kuznechnoye Railway

== Description ==
The total length of the tracks is 10,378.4 km, the total length of the tracks is 13323,762 km.

The largest node is St. Petersburg, where rail administration is located.

All sections of the October Railway, with the exception of the Svir-Murmansk section and the Babaevo-Costa section, are electrified with a 3-kV direct current. The Svir-Murmansk and Babaevo-Costa sections are electrified with an alternating current of 25 kV. Transit Toksovo-Peri, Priozersk direction

The main course of the October Railway follows the historical Nikolayevskaya railway. A smaller section follows the Malaya Vishera - Burga route.

The modern October line runs north to south from Murmansk to Moscow (over 2 thousand km), with more than 900 km located beyond the Arctic Circle. In the transport system of the North-West region of Russia, the railroad accounted for 75% of freight traffic and 40% of passenger traffic. For 2009, the number of employees of the October Railway was 69,781 people. For 2010, the structure of the road includes 655 stations, 31 locomotive and motor-car depots (including repair, operational and turnover depots), 24 car depots (including repair and maintenance depots), 39 track distances, 23 signaling distances, centralization, interlocking and communications, 13 electrification and power supply distances, 11 distances of civil structures, water supply and sanitation, 3 cargo handling distances. Suburban train Vyborg - Hiytola on the Guards division - Revival

In connection with the ongoing reforms of the Russian Railways, the number of structural subdivisions and their names may change in the foreseeable future. For example, in October the Oktyabrskaya Railway Administration (8 regional communication centers) with a population of 2,702 people, the Oktyabrskaya Directorate for the repair of Path (11 track machine stations, 2 experimental track machine stations, 2 rail welding plants and Lodeinopolsky Plant of silicate products) numbering 5,098 people, enterprises for the production of materials for the upper structure of the track (Chudovskiy plant of reinforced concrete sleepers, Bologovsky sewage treatment plant, Gavrilovsky, Medvezhyegorsk and Olenegorsk Th crushed stone factories) totaling 1,058 people. Total withdrawn 8,858 people.

Head of the October Railway: Goloskokov Vladimir Nikolaevich (since January 2016).

The Oktyabrskaya railway passes through the territory of eleven constituent entities of the Russian Federation - the Leningrad, Pskov, Novgorod, Vologda, Murmansk, Tver, Moscow, Yaroslavl regions, Moscow and St. Petersburg, the Republic of Karelia, and partly through Estonia, Latvia, and Belarus.

Combined railway and water transportation of goods (including export-import) is carried out through the St. Petersburg and Murmansk seaports, the ports of the White Sea (Kandalaksha, Vitino, Kem, Belomorsk) and the White Sea-Baltic Canal (on the Medvezhyegorsk-Belomorsk line).

Suburban passenger transportations on the road range are carried out by the North-West and Moscow-Tver suburban passenger companies.

The main move of the Railways "St. Petersburg - Moscow" from the moment of construction to the present day is one of the most tense directions in Russia. In the 1980s, the leadership of the USSR decided to organize a high-speed movement on it. As a result, the route from St. Petersburg to Moscow became the first and only high-speed railway in the USSR.

== Subdivisions ==
- Moscow Railway Division
- Murmansk Railway Division
- Petrozavodsk Railway Division
- Saint Petersburg Railway Division
- Saint Petersburg-Vitebsk Railway Division
- Volkhovstroy Railway Division

The Small October Railway (Malaya Oktyabrskaya Railway) is a narrow gauge railway in Saint Petersburg which operates since 1948. Stations include Ozyornaya, Yuny and Pionerskaya. This is a children's railway.

== Business trends ==
In 2009, the October Railway transported 218.3 million tons of cargo, 181.6 million people (in the long-distance communication - 22.1 million, in the suburban transportation - 159.5 million people).

In 2011, the number of passengers transported through the October Railway infrastructure was more than 134 million 183 thousand, which is 1.4 million more than in 2010. Of these, 118.6 million passengers were transported in a suburban transportation, in the long haul - about 17 million

== See also ==
- Imperatorsky pavilyon railway station
- Upper Volga railway
- Railway transportation in the Tver region
