= Pestovo, Pestovsky District, Novgorod Oblast =

Town in Novgorod Oblast, Russia

Pestovo Пестово
- Town
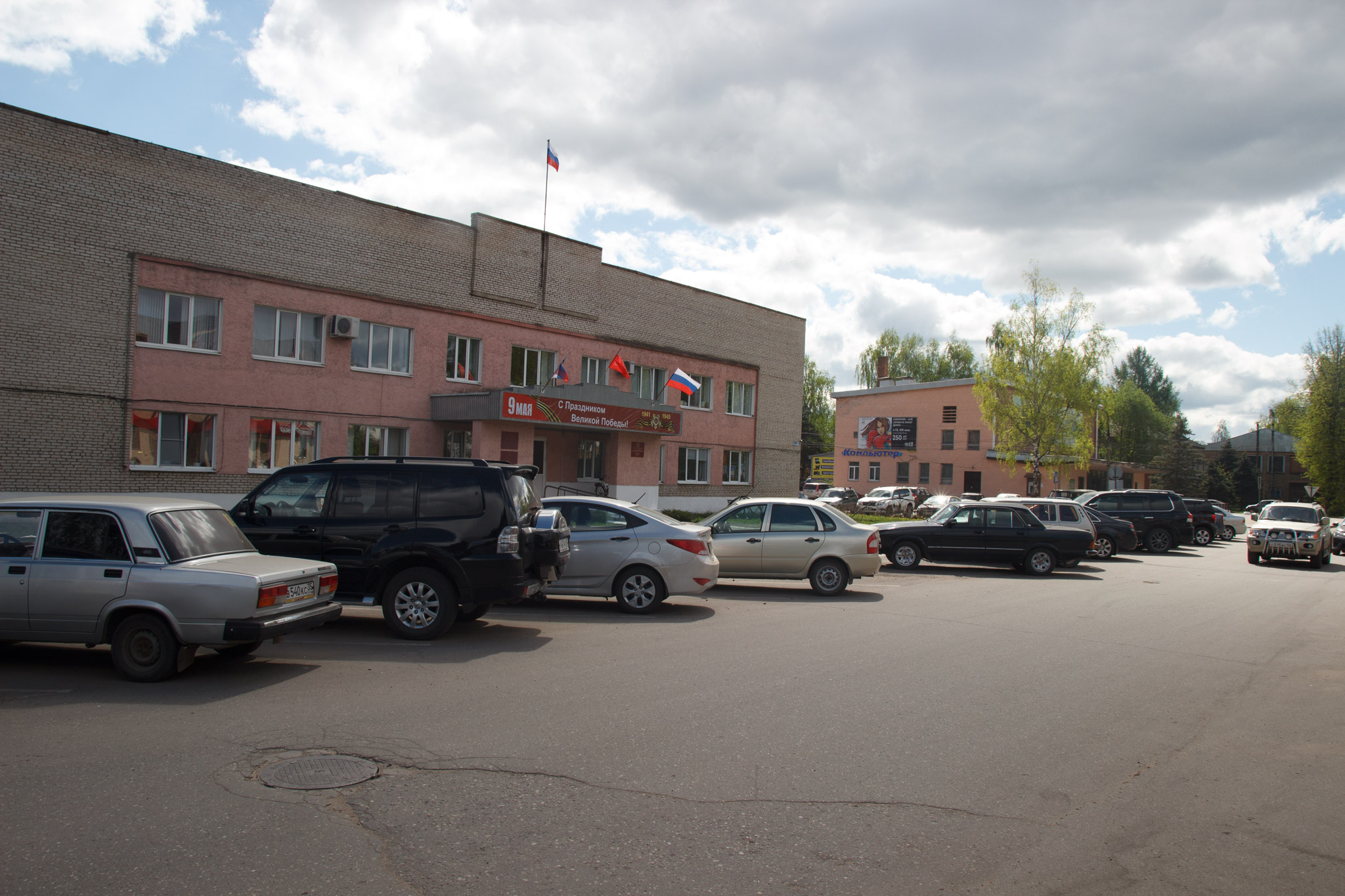
- Town hall of Pestovo

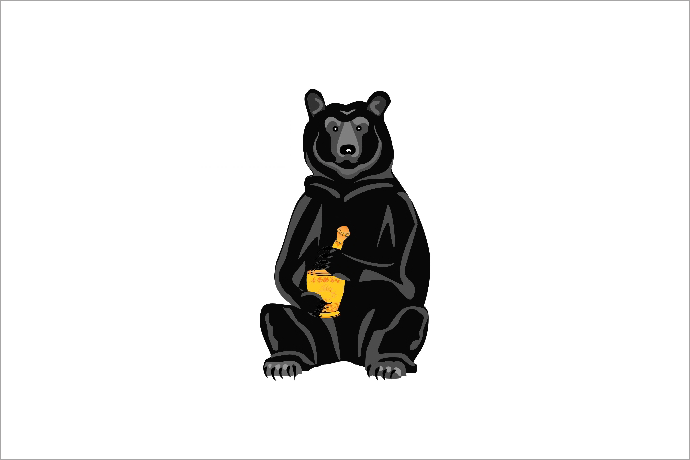
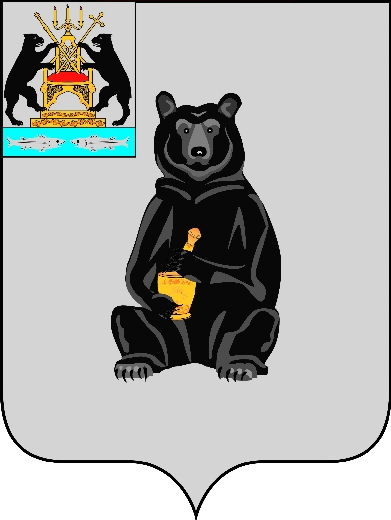
- Flag Coat of arms
- Interactive map of Pestovo
- Location of Pestovo Pestovo (Novgorod Oblast)
- Coordinates: 58°36′N 35°49′E
- Country: Russia
- Federal subject: Novgorod Oblast
- Administrative district: Pestovsky District
- Town of district significanceSelsoviet: Pestovo
- Founded: 1925
- Town status since: January 12, 1965
- Elevation: 125 m (410 ft)

Population (2010 Census)
  - Total: 15,903
  - Estimate (2021): 14,032 (−11.8%)

Administrative status
  - Capital of: Pestovsky District, town of district significance of Pestovo

Municipal status
  - Municipal district: Pestovsky Municipal District
  - Urban settlement: Pestovskoye Urban Settlement
  - Capital of: Pestovsky Municipal District, Pestovskoye Urban Settlement
- Time zone: UTC+3 (MSK)
- Postal codes: 174510, 174511
- OKTMO ID: 49632101001
- Website: pestovo-goradmin.ru

Pestovo (Russian: Песто́во) is a town and the administrative center of Pestovsky District in Novgorod Oblast, Russia, located in the Valdai Hills on the Mologa River. Population: 15,903 (2010 census); 15,990 (2002 census); 15,941 (1989 Soviet census).

== History ==
In the 1910s, a railway between Sonkovo and Mga was built. The railway station which is now located in the town of Pestovo was named after the village of Russkoye Pestovo, located 2 versts (2.1 km; 1.3 mi) from the station. The first train arrived to the station in 1915. The name of Russkoye Pestovo, and subsequently the name of Pestovo, originates from the personal Novgorodian name Pest. At the time, the area was a part of Ustyuzhensky Uyezd in Cherepovets Governorate.

In 1924, a sawmill was constructed on the bank of the Mologa close to the station. The sawmill was built by a German company and given to it as a concession. In 1925, a settlement of Pestovo, serving the sawmill, was founded.

On August 1, 1927, Cherepovets Governorate was abolished, and its territory was merged into Cherepovets Okrug of Leningrad Oblast. The uyezds were abolished as well and, effective October 1, 1927, Pestovsky District was established, with the administrative center in Pestovo. On September 19, 1927, Pestovo was granted work settlement status. On July 23, 1930 the okrugs were abolished and the districts were directly subordinated to the oblast. On July 5, 1944, Pestovsky District was transferred to newly established Novgorod Oblast. On January 12, 1965, Pestovo was granted the town status.

== Administrative and municipal status ==
Within the framework of administrative divisions, Pestovo serves as the administrative center of Pestovsky District. As an administrative division, it is incorporated within Pestovsky District as the town of district significance of Pestovo. As a municipal division, the town of district significance of Pestovo is incorporated within Pestovsky Municipal District as Pestovskoye Urban Settlement.

== Economy ==
=== Industry ===
There is a mechanical factory in Pestovo which currently mainly produces metallic containers and construction blocks. There are also enterprises of timber industry and food industry.

=== Transportation ===
The railway connecting Sonkovo and Mga, or, more generally, the northern railroad between Moscow and St. Petersburg, crosses Pestovsky District. Pestovo has a railway station. As of 2012, it was only served by local trains.

A road connecting Ustyuzhna with Borovichi runs through Pestovo.

== Culture and recreation ==
The Intercession Church located in Pestovo is protected as a cultural heritage monument of local significance. The church was built in the second half of the 19th century in the village of Pokrov-Mologa, located on the right bank of the Mologa River. The village was subsequently included in Pestovo.
