= Tver Oblast =

First-level administrative division of Russia

Tver Oblast Тверская область (Russian)
- Oblast
- Flag Coat of arms

- Coordinates: 57°09′N 34°36′E
- Country: Russia
- Federal district: Central
- Economic region: Central
- Established: January 29, 1935
- Administrative center: Tver

Government
  - Body: Legislative Assembly
  - Governor: Vitaly Korolyov (acting)

Area
  - Total: 84,201 km^{2} (32,510 sq mi)
  - Rank: 39th

Population (2021 census)
  - Total: 1,230,171
  - Estimate (2018): 1,283,873
  - Rank: 36th
  - Density: 14.610/km^{2} (37.840/sq mi)
  - Urban: 76.3%
  - Rural: 23.7%

GDP (nominal, 2024)
  - Total: ₽826 billion (US$9.69 billion)
  - Per capita: ₽690,823 (US$8,106.25)
- Time zone: UTC+3 (MSK)
- ISO 3166 code: RU-TVE
- License plates: 69
- OKTMO ID: 28000000
- Official languages: Russian
- Website: http://www.region.tver.ru

Tver Oblast (Russian: Тверская область, romanized: Tvierskaja oblastʹ) is a federal subject of Russia (an oblast). Its administrative center is the city of Tver. From 1935 to 1990, it was known as Kalinin Oblast (Russian: Калининская область). Population: 1,353,392 (2010 census).

Tver Oblast is a region of lakes, such as Seliger and Brosno. Much of the remaining area is occupied by the Valdai Hills, where the Volga, the Western Dvina, and the Dnieper have their source.

Tver Oblast is one of the tourist regions of Russia with a modern tourist infrastructure. There are many historic towns, such as Torzhok, Zubtsov, Kashin, Vyshny Volochyok, and Kalyazin. The oldest of these is Rzhev, primarily known for the Battles of Rzhev in World War II and the Rzhev Memorial. Staritsa was the seat of the last appanage principality in Russia, while Ostashkov, located on lake Seliger, is a major center of recreational and nature tourism.

== Geography ==
Tver Oblast is located in the west of the middle part of the East European Plain. It stretches for 260 km from north to south and 450 km from west to east. The area borders Yaroslavl Oblast in the east, Vologda Oblast in the northeast, Novgorod Oblast in the northwest and north, Moscow in the southeast, Smolensk Oblast in the southwest, and Pskov Oblast in the west.

The area of Tver Oblast is 84201 km^{2}, the 38th of 85 subjects. This accounts for 0.49% of the territory of Russia, and it is the largest territory (by area) of the Central Federal District.

=== Relief ===
Tver Oblast as a whole is characterized by flat terrain with alternating lowlands and highlands due to its location in the East European Plain. In the western part of the province, occupying about one-third of its area is Valdai Hills, with elevations of 200–300 m above sea level. It is surrounded by depressions, lowlands, and has a height of 100–150 m. The highest point of the area has a height of 347 m and is located on the hill Tsninsky (The top of the Valdai). The lowest point (61 m) – the extreme north-west area of the river's edge Kunya (Russian: Кунья) on the border with the Novgorod Oblast.

=== Natural resources ===
Minerals discovered and developed in the Tver Oblast are mainly deposits of ancient seas, lakes and swamps, and partly a consequence of glaciers (clastic rocks).

Minerals of industrial importance are the seams of brown coal, which form part of the Moscow coal basin. The largest deposit is Bolshoy Nelidovskiy, which gave between 1948 and 1996 about 21 million tons.

Widespread powerful peat deposits totaling 15.4 billion m³. The estimated reserves of peat are 2.051 billion tonnes, representing approximately 7% of the stock of European Russia. On an industrial scale mastered 43 peat deposits with a total area of about 300 hectares, the main exploited stocks are concentrated in five fields located in the central and southern parts of the oblast. From 1971 to 1999, has developed more than 44 million tons of peat.

Distributed limestones (near the town of Bayou several centuries developed reserves of white Staritskogo stone). Dolomitic limestones are common along rivers Vazuza, Osugi, Tsna (marble-like limestone), there are deposits of tile, brick and pottery ( refractory ) of clay and quartz sand, sapropel are numerous underground fresh water and mineral formations, and sources for the medicinal table water Kashinskaya.

=== Rivers ===
The region is a watershed of the Caspian Sea and Baltic Sea. In the south, the Belsky district has several tributaries of the upper reaches of the river Vop, the right tributary of the Dnieper River (basin of the Black Sea). Go to the Caspian Sea basin owns 70% of the region, the Baltic Sea – 29.7%.

There are more than 800 rivers in the region longer than 10 km with a total length of about 17,000 km. The main river – Volga ( 685 km within the region). Its source is in the Ostashkov area. The most important tributaries of the Volga: the Mologa (280 km), the Medveditsa (269 km), the Tvertsa (188 km). Other important rivers: the Western Dvina and its tributary the Mezha (259 km), the Msta and the Tsna (160 km).

=== Climate ===
The climate is humid continental, transitional from continental Russia to the more humid north-western regions. The area lies in a zone of comfort for living and recreation in climatic conditions. Average January temperatures range from −8 °C (18 °F) in west to −13 °C (9 °F) in northeast, and July from +17 °C (63 °F) to +19 °C (66 °F) °C. The average annual rainfall ranges from 560 to 720 mm, and the greatest amount of precipitation falls on the western slopes of the Valdai Hills. The snow cover starts in mid-November, the period with snow cover lasts 130–150 days, and snow depth is about 40–60 cm, with a maximum of 80 cm.

== History ==
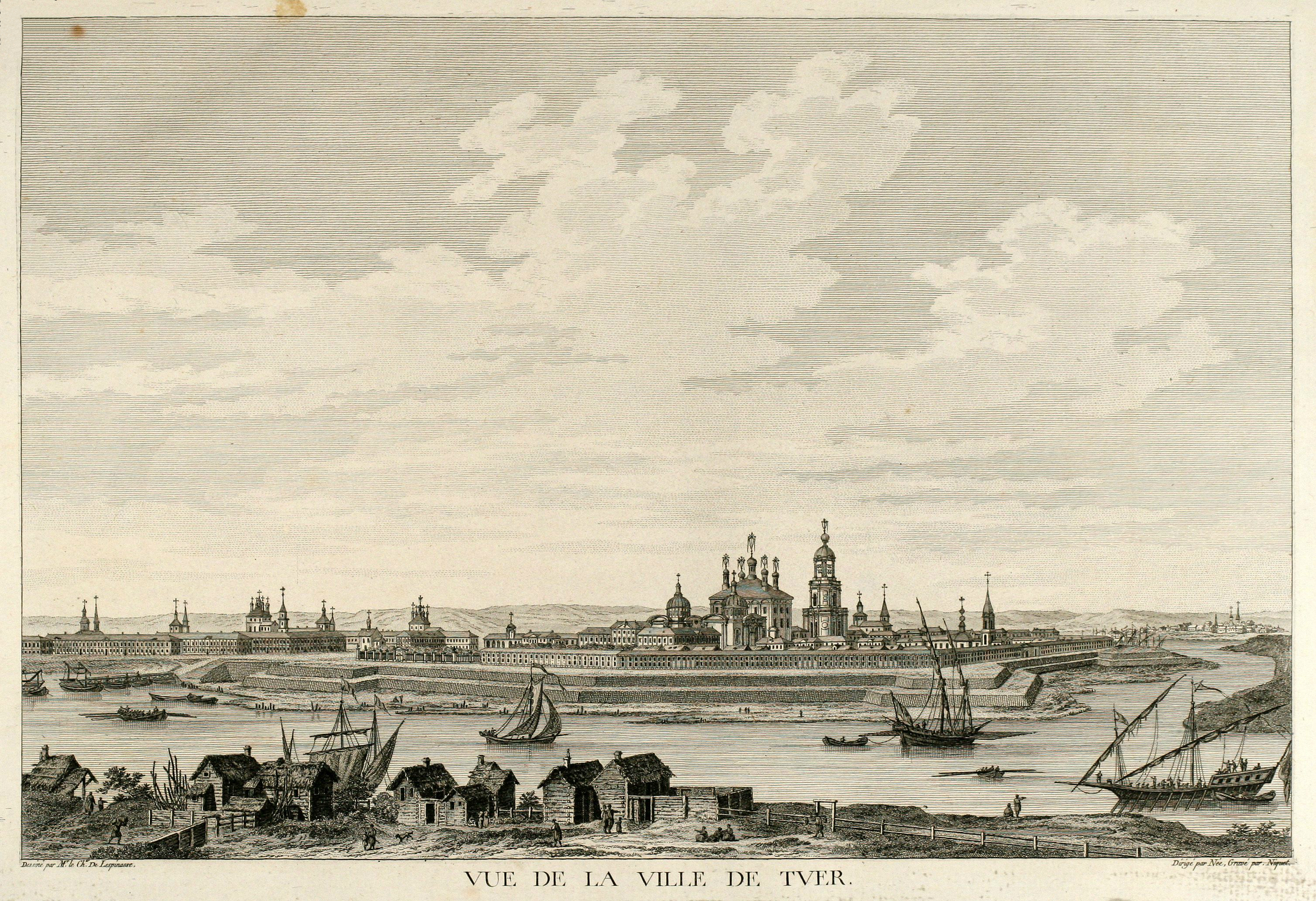
18th-century view of Tver

There was a settlement on land at the confluence of the Tmaka River and Volga Rivers in the 9th and 10th centuries. A fortress was built on the site much later, during the fighting between the Rostov-Suzdal princes and the Novgorod Republic. From the 13th to 15th centuries, the area was part of the Principality of Tver, which competed with Moscow for supremacy in Russia, except for the western outskirts with Toropets, which were part of the Principality of Smolensk and Grand Duchy of Lithuania. The south-western part with Bely formed part of the Polish–Lithuanian Commonwealth until 1654.

In the 18th century, Tver became an administrative center; at first, it was part of Saint Petersburg Governorate (1708–1727), and then, of Novgorod Governorate. In 1775, the Tver Viceroyalty was formed; in 1796, it was transformed into Tver Governorate. In September 1929, Tver became the administrative center of Tver District of Moscow Oblast in the Russian Soviet Federative Socialist Republic (Russian SFSR). In November 1931, the city of Tver was renamed Kalinin. On 29 January 1935, Kalinin Oblast was formed from parts of Western, Leningrad and Moscow Oblasts. Ostashkov housed a NKVD prisoner-of-war camp for some 7,000 Poles, taken prisoner during the invasion of Poland at the start of World War II, 6,300 of whom were murdered in 1940 in Kalinin as part of the Katyn massacre, and buried in Mednoye. Germany occupied part of this area from 1941 to 1943.

On 17 July 1990, by decree of the Presidium of the Supreme Soviet of the Russian SFSR, the Kalinin Oblast was renamed Tver Oblast. On 21 April 1992, the Congress of People's Deputies of Russia approved the decision of the presidium of the parliament to rename the region, amending Art. 71 of the Constitution of the Russian SFSR of 1978, which entered into force on May 16, 1992.

On 13 June 1996, Tver Oblast, alongside Leningrad Oblast and the city of Saint Petersburg, signed a power-sharing agreement with the federal government, granting it autonomy. This agreement would be abolished on 19 February 2002.

On August 23, 2023, a private jet carrying Yevgeny Prigozhin, the Wagner Group leader, crashed in the region.

== Politics ==
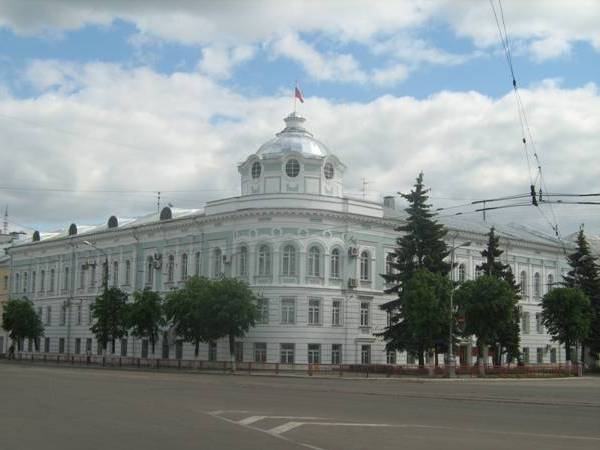
Oblast Administration building, May 2008

During the Soviet period, the high authority in the oblast was shared between three persons: The first secretary of the Tver CPSU Committee (who in reality had the biggest authority), the chairman of the oblast Soviet (legislative power), and the Chairman of the oblast Executive Committee (executive power). After the abolition of Article 6 of the Constitution of the USSR in March 1990, the CPSU lost its monopoly on power. The head of the Oblast administration, and eventually the governor was appointed/elected alongside elected regional parliament.

The Charter of Tver Oblast is the fundamental law of the region. The Legislative Assembly of Tver Oblast is the province's standing legislative (representative) body. The Legislative Assembly exercises its authority by passing laws, resolutions, and other legal acts and by supervising the implementation and observance of the laws and other legal acts passed by it. The highest executive body is the Oblast Administration, which includes territorial executive bodies such as district administrations, committees, and commissions that facilitate development and run the day-to-day matters of the province. The Oblast administration supports the activities of the Governor who is the highest official and acts as guarantor of the observance of the Oblast Charter in accordance with the Constitution of Russia.

=== Government ===
On 13 March 2011, elections to the regional legislative assembly were held. United Russia received 39.8% of the vote, the Communist Party – 24.6%, A Just Russia – 21.3%, and the Liberal Democratic Party – 11.01%. Thus, according to the party lists, the United Russia party received nine seats in the Legislative Assembly. In single-mandate constituencies, candidates from United Russia also won in 17 out of 20 constituencies, and communist candidates won in the other three. In general, United Russia received 26 mandates out of 40. The Communists received eight mandates, A Just Russia – four, and the Liberal Democratic Party – two.

Legislative power is exercised by the Legislative Assembly of the Tver Oblast, and executive power is exercised by the Government of the Tver Oblast, headed by the Governor.

== Administrative divisions ==
Administratively, Tver Oblast is divided into two urban-type settlements under the federal government management (Ozyorny and Solnechny), five cities and towns of oblast significance (Tver, Kimry, Rzhev, Torzhok, and Vyshny Volochyok), and thirty-six districts.

== Economy ==
Tver Oblast has a very strong economy due to its machinery industry in the automobile and aeronautics sectors.

=== Transportation ===
The Oblast has a well-developed infrastructure consisting of railway, river, motor vehicle, air, and pipeline transportation systems. Tver Oblast has one of the highest proportions of paved roads in the country. The region's location between Russia's two major cities, Moscow and St. Petersburg, has an obvious influence on traffic flows from Northern Europe and the Baltic countries to central Russia.

The area is crossed by two federal highways: M10 "Russia" and M9 "Baltic". Of internal roads are significant Torzhok A111 – A112 Ostashkov and Tver-Rzhev. The length of paved roads – 16,032 km.

There are three civilian airports close to Tver: Migalovo with a runway for commercial aviation, 2500m in length, airport local lines Zmeevo (now – heliport) and Orlovka Airfield (ICAO: UUTO).

The development of navigation on the Volga river port "Tver" with a cargo jetty for boats "river-sea" with a draft of up to four meters.

Four railways going from Moscow to the north, northwest and west cross the region: northwest to Saint Petersburg via Tver – Bologoye (main course of the Oktyabrskaya Railway), west across the Rzhev – Velikiye Luki (branch of Riga, Vilnius, Warsaw and Kaliningrad – Berlin. to Kimry – Sonkovo – Pestovo – St. Petersburg; to Pskov through Tver – Bologoe. The largest railway junction of Tver Oblast is located in Bologoye.

The narrow gauge railway of KSM-2 factory, Tver serves a factory of building materials No.2 in Tver.

== Demographics ==
Historical population
Year	Pop.	±%
1897	1,769,135	—
1926	2,242,350	+26.7%
1959	1,806,787	−19.4%
1970	1,717,237	−5.0%
1979	1,649,022	−4.0%
1989	1,670,117	+1.3%
2002	1,471,459	−11.9%
2010	1,353,392	−8.0%
2021	1,230,171	−9.1%
2025	1,189,685	−3.3%
Source: Census data, estimate

Population: 1,230,171 (2021 census); 1,353,392 (2010 census); 1,471,459 (2002 census); 1,670,117 (1989 Soviet census).

Vital statistics for 2024:

- Births: 8,064 (6.8 per 1,000)
- Deaths: 19,758 (16.5 per 1,000)

Total fertility rate (2024):
1.26 children per woman

Life expectancy (2021):
Total — 67.87 years (male — 62.81, female — 73.04)

Ethnic composition (2021):

- Russians – 94.2%
- Tajiks – 0.7%
- Armenians – 0.6%
- Ukrainians – 0.6%
- Azerbaijanis – 0.3%
- Tatars – 0.3%
- Karelians – 0.3%
- Others – 3%
- 144,410 people were registered from administrative databases, and could not declare an ethnicity. It is estimated that the proportion of ethnicities in this group is the same as that of the declared group.

=== Religion ===
Religion in Tver Oblast as of 2012 (Sreda Arena Atlas)
Russian Orthodoxy	30%
Other Orthodox	0.5%
Christians	9%
Islam	1%
Spiritual but not religious	34%
Atheism and irreligion	20%
Other and undeclared	5%

According to a 2012 survey, 30% of the population of Tver Oblast adheres to the Russian Orthodox Church, 9% are unaffiliated generic Christians, and 1% are Muslims. In addition, 34% of the population declares to be "spiritual but not religious", 20% is atheist, and 5% follows other religions or did not give an answer to the question.

=== Tver Karelians ===
A branch of Karelians, known as Tver Karelians, live in the oblast. They numbered 140,567 in 1926. Due to heavy casualties suffered during World War II, they vanished as a separate ethnic group from most parts of the oblast. The Tver Karelians numbered 14,633 according to the 2002 Census.

== Culture ==
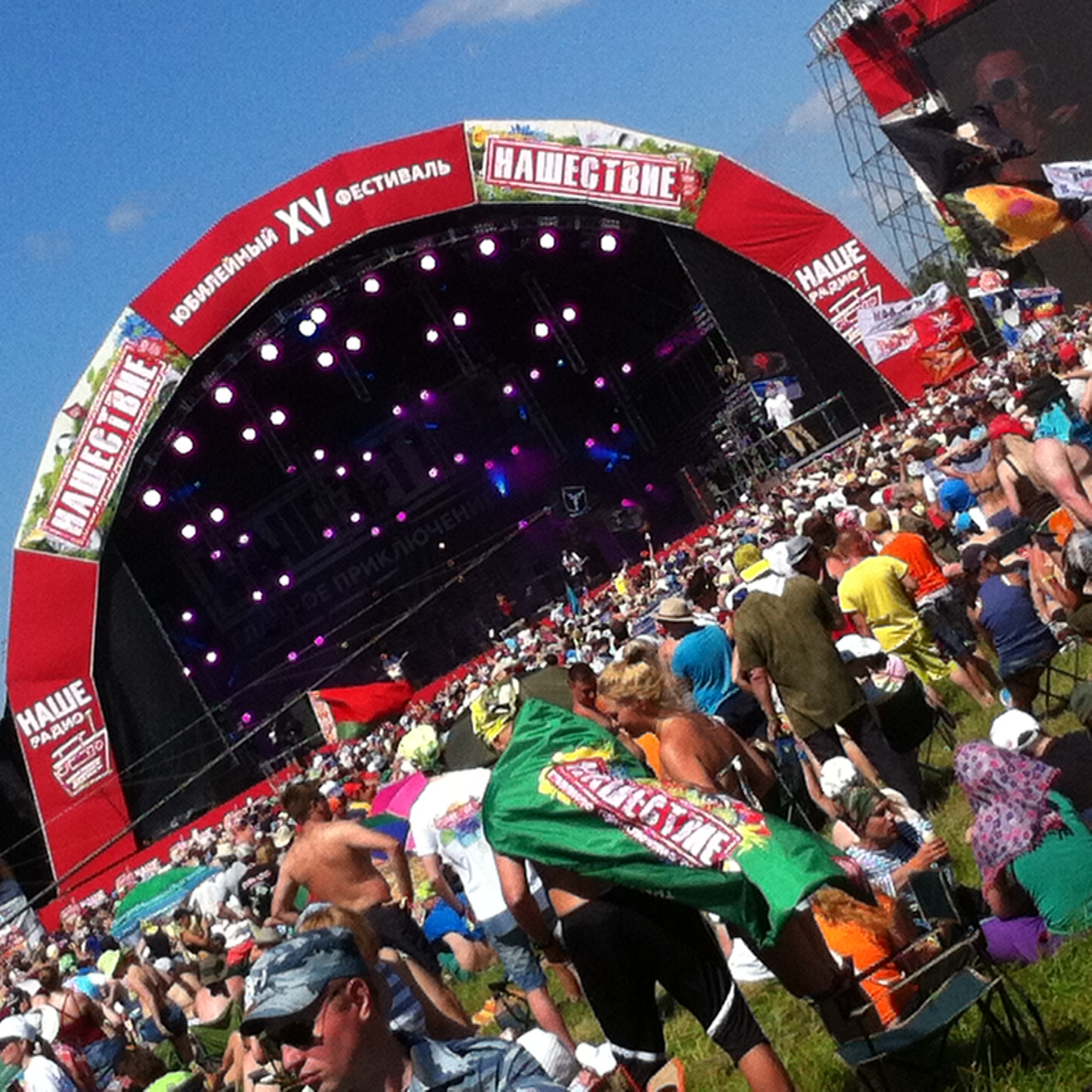
Nashestvie in 2015

Bolshoe Zavidovo in Tver Oblast hosts Nashestvie, the largest festival of Russian rock, since 2009. Previously, in 2004–2008, it was hosted in Emmaus, also in Tver Oblast.

== See also ==
- Railway transportation in the Tver region
