= List of rural localities in Tver Oblast =

Map of Russia with Tver Oblast highlighted

This is a list of rural localities in Tver Oblast. Tver Oblast (Russian: Тверска́я о́бласть, Tverskaya oblast) is a federal subject of Russia (an oblast). Its administrative center is the city of Tver. From 1935 to 1990, it was known as Kalinin Oblast (Кали́нинская о́бласть), named after Mikhail Kalinin. Population: 1,353,392 (2010 Census).

== Andreapolsky District ==
Rural localities in Andreapolsky District:

- Abakanovo

== Bezhetsky District ==
Rural localities in Bezhetsky District:

- Bormino
- Gryada
- Kulovo
- Lyubini
- Potyosy

== Bologovsky District ==
Rural localities in Bologovsky District:

- Lykoshino

== Firovsky District ==
Rural localities in Firovsky District:

- Komkino

== Kalininsky District ==
Rural localities in Kalininsky District:

- Avvakumovo
- Mednoye
- Tukhin

== Kalyazinsky District ==
Rural localities in Kalyazinsky District:

- Sknyatino

== Kashinsky District ==
Rural localities in Kashinsky District:

- Buzykovo
- Miloslavskoye
- Yurino
- Zlobino

== Konakovsky District ==
Rural localities in Konakovsky District:

- 1st May
- Zavidovo

== Krasnokholmsky District ==
Rural localities in Krasnokholmsky District:

- Mashino

== Kuvshinovsky District ==
Rural localities in Kuvshinovsky District:

- Novo

== Lesnoy District ==
Rural localities in Lesnoy District:

- Lesnoye
- Viglino

== Likhoslavlsky District ==
Rural localities in Likhoslavlsky District:

- Pervitino

== Maksatikhinsky District ==
Rural localities in Maksatikhinsky District:

- Kostretsy

== Molokovsky District ==
Rural localities in Molokovsky District:

- Kosovo

== Oleninsky District ==
Rural localities in Oleninsky District:

- Uleyki

== Ostashkovsky District ==
Rural localities in Ostashkovsky District:

- Ivanova Gora

== Penovsky District ==
Rural localities in Penovsky District:

- Moskva

== Rameshkovsky District ==
Rural localities in Rameshkovsky District:

- Lavrovo
- Vilovo

== Rzhevsky District ==
Rural localities in Rzhevsky District:

- Mologino

== Sandovsky District ==
Rural localities in Sandovsky District:

- Lvovskoye
- Ustrovka

== Torzhoksky District ==
Rural localities in Torzhoksky District:

- Ilyino

== Udomelsky District ==
Rural localities in Udomelsky District:

- Brusovo
- Ozyora
- Svirka

== Vesyegonsky District ==
Rural localities in Vesyegonsky District:

- Badachyovo
- Borshchevo
- Chistaya Dubrova
- Kesma
- Yogna

== Vyshnevolotsky District ==
Rural localities in Vyshnevolotsky District:

- Mazovo

== Zharkovsky District ==
Rural localities in Zharkovsky District:

- Kamino

== Zubtsovsky District ==
Rural localities in Zubtsovsky District:

- Pogoreloye Gorodishche

== See also ==
- Lists of rural localities in Russia
