= Abakanovo =

Abakanovo (Russian: Абаканово) is the name of several rural localities in Russia:

- Abakanovo, Tver Oblast, a village in Toropatskoye Rural Settlement of Andreapolsky District of Tver Oblast; 56°46′26″N 32°04′26″E
- Abakanovo, Cherepovetsky District, Vologda Oblast, a selo in Abakanovsky Selsoviet of Cherepovetsky District of Vologda Oblast; 59°17′13″N 37°39′34″E
- Abakanovo, Kaduysky District, Vologda Oblast, a village in Nikolskoye Rural Settlement of Kaduysky District of Vologda Oblast; 59°29′21″N 37°01′52″E
- Abakanovo, Vologodsky District, Vologda Oblast, a village in Semenkovsky Selsoviet of Vologodsky District of Vologda Oblast; 59°17′43″N 39°49′27″E
