= Borshchevo =

Borshchevo or Borshchyovo (Борщево, Борщёво) may refer to:

- Borshchevo, Moscow Oblast, a village (selo) in Moscow Oblast, Russia
- Borshchevo, Kashinsky District, Tver Oblast, a village in Kashinsky District of Tver Oblast, Russia
- Borshchevo, Vesyegonsky District, Tver Oblast, a village in Vesyegonsky District of Tver Oblast, Russia
- Borshchevo, Zubtsovsky District, Tver Oblast, a village in Zubtsovsky District of Tver Oblast, Russia
- Borshchevo, name of several other rural localities in Russia
- five sites of the Kostyonki-Borshchyovo archaeological complex, Voronezh oblast
