= Kostretsy =

Kostretsy may refer to:

- Kostretsy, Pskov Oblast, a village in Pskov Oblast, Russia
- Kostretsy, Tver Oblast, a village in Tver Oblast, Russia
