= Vilovo =

Vilovo may refer to:

- Vilovo, Russia, a rural locality (a village) in Tver Oblast, Russia
- Vilovo, Serbia, a village in the Autonomous Province of Vojvodina, Serbia
