= Mazovo =

Mazovo may refer to:

- Mazovo, Tver Oblast, a village in Tver Oblast, Russia
- Mazovo, name of several other rural localities in Russia
