= Lyubini =

Lyubini (Russian: Любини) may refer to:

- Lyubini, Bezhetsky District, Tver Oblast, a village in Bezhetsky District of Tver Oblast, Russia
- Lyubini, Torzhoksky District, Tver Oblast, a village in Torzhoksky District of Tver Oblast, Russia
