= Ozyora =

Ozyora or Ozera may refer to:

- Ozyora, Pskov Oblast, a village in Pskov Oblast, Russia
- Ozyora, Tver Oblast, a village in Tver Oblast, Russia
- Ozera, Bucha Raion, Kyiv Oblast, a village in Kyiv Oblast, Ukraine
- Ozera, Okhtyrka Raion, Sumy Oblast, a village in Sumy Oblast, Ukraine
- Ozera, Oleksandriia Raion, Kirovohrad Oblast, a village in Kirovohrad Oblast, Ukraine
- Ozera, Poltava Raion, Poltava Oblast, a village in Poltava Oblast, Ukraine
- Ozera, Zhytomyr Raion, Zhytomyr Oblast, a rural settlement in Zhytomyr Oblast, Ukraine
