= Kulovo =

Kulovo may refer to:

- Kulovo, Ryazan Oblast, a village in Ryazan Oblast, Russia
- Kulovo, Tver Oblast, a village in Tver Oblast, Russia
