= Mashino =

Mashino may refer to:

- Mashino, Sergiyevo-Posadsky District, Moscow Oblast, a village in Sergiyevo-Posadsky District of Moscow Oblast, Russia
- Mashino, Shchyolkovsky District, Moscow Oblast, a village in Shchyolkovsky District of Moscow Oblast, Russia
- Mashino, Tver Oblast, a village in Tver Oblast, Russia
- Mashino, name of several other rural localities in Russia
