= Zlobino =

Village in Kashinsky District of Tver Oblast, Russia

Coordinates: 57°27′27″N 37°29′15″E

Zlobino (Russian: Зло́бино) is a village in Kashinsky District of Tver Oblast, Russia. It is located near the villages of Yurino, Buzykovo, and Miloslavskoye.

== History ==
In 1862 the village was part of the Kashinsky Uyezd and there were 40 men and 48 women.
