= Avvakumovo =

Avvakumovo Аввакумово
- Village
- Location within Tver Oblast Location within Russia
- Coordinates: 56°52′N 36°00′E
- Country: Russia
- Region: Tver Oblast
- District: Kalininsky District
- Time zone: UTC+3:00

Avvakumovo (Russian: Авваку́мово) is a rural locality (a village) and the administrative center of Avvakumovskoye Rural Settlement of Kalininsky District, Tver Oblast, Russia. The population was 1284 as of 2017. There are 27 streets.

== Geography ==
Avvakumovo is located 8 km northeast of Tver (the district's administrative centre) by road. Zhdanovo is the nearest rural locality.
