= Vasilyevsky Mokh =

Vasilyevsky Mokh Васильевский Мох
- Work settlement
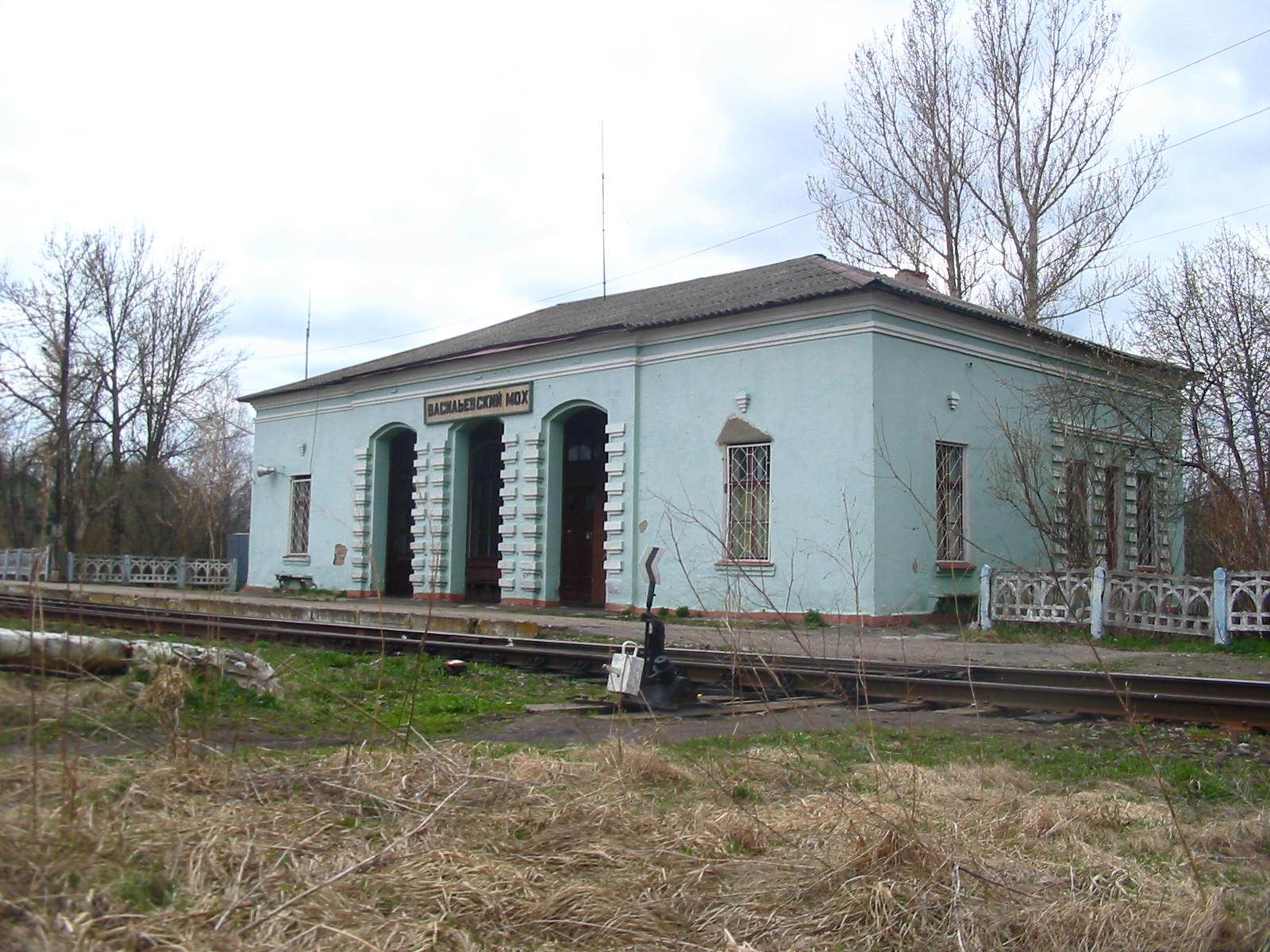
- Interactive map of Vasilyevsky Mokh
- Location of Vasilyevsky Mokh Vasilyevsky Mokh (Tver Oblast)
- Coordinates: 57°00′50″N 35°55′12″E
- Country: Russia
- Federal subject: Tver Oblast
- Administrative district: Kalininsky District
- Founded: 1920

Population (2010 Census)
  - Total: 2,122
  - Estimate (2021): 2,309 (+8.8%)

Municipal status
  - Municipal district: Kalininsky Municipal District
  - Urban settlement: Urban Settlement Vasilyevsky Mokh
  - Capital of: Urban Settlement Vasilyevsky Mokh
- Time zone: UTC+3 (MSK)
- Postal code: 170517
- OKTMO ID: 28620155051

Vasilyevsky Mokh (Russian: Васи́льевский Мох) is an urban locality (an urban-type settlement) in Kalininsky District of Tver Oblast, Russia, located about 20 kilometres (12 mi) north of the city of Tver. Population: 2,122 (2010 census); 2,578 (2002 census); 3,511 (1989 Soviet census).

== History ==
In 1928, peat extraction started in the swamps north of Tver, and Vasilyevsky Mokh was founded as an aggregation of several settlements serving the peat production enterprises in the area. The settlements were Vasilyevsky Mokh proper, Vostok, and Yany. In 1934, they were all merged into an urban-type settlelement which got the name Vasilyevsky Mokh.

In 1928, the area belonged to Tverskoy Uyezd of Tver Governorate. On July 12, 1929 the governorates and uyezds were abolished. Tverskoy District, with the administrative center in Tver, was established within Tver Okrug of Moscow Oblast, and the area was transferred to Tverskoy District. On July 23, 1930, the okrugs were abolished, and the districts were directly subordinated to the oblast. On November 20, 1931 Tver was renamed Kalinin, and consequently Tverskoy District was renamed Kalininsky District. On January 29, 1935 Kalinin Oblast was established, and Kalininsky District was transferred to Kalinin Oblast. In 1990, Kalinin Oblast was renamed Tver Oblast.

== Economy ==
=== Industry ===
Vasilyevsky Mokh has a number of peat extraction enterprises.

=== Transportation ===
There is a passenger line from Doroshikha (in the city limits of Tver) to Vasilyevsky Mokh, however, the passenger traffic to Vasilyevsky Mokh discontinued in 2013, and the line is likely to be demolished.

A road connects Vasilyevsky Mokh with Tver.
