= Pervitino local history museum =

Pervitino Local History Museum
- Первитинский краеведческий музей
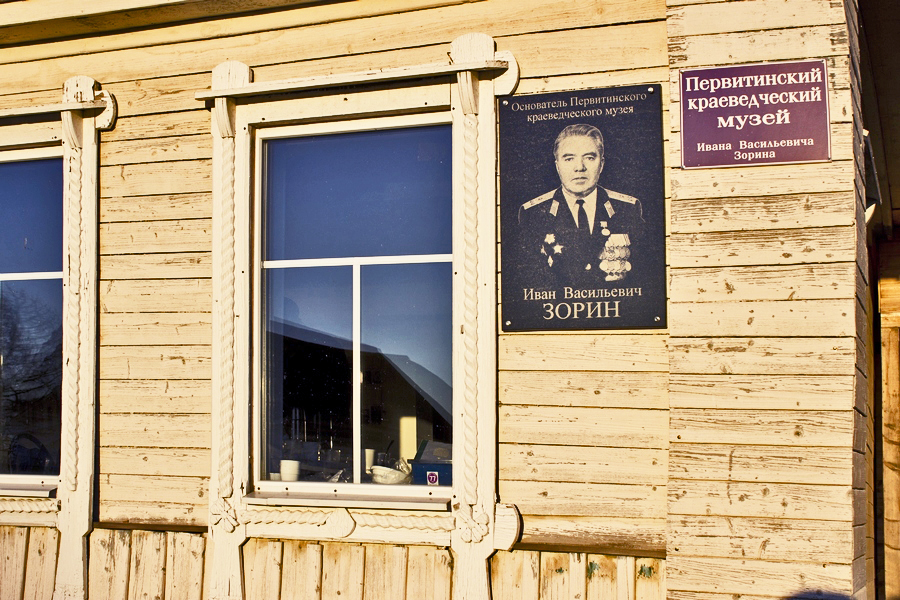
- Pervitino Local History Museum building
- Established: 1981
- Location: Sevastyanova st., 14, Pervitino village, Likhoslavlsky District, Tver Oblast
- Type: Museum of local history
- Director: Mrs. Valentina Ivanovna Kruglova (Russian: Круглова Валентина Ивановна)

Pervitino local history museum is a museum of Local Lore and History located in Pervitino village, Likhoslavlsky District, Tver Oblast in 15 kilometres from Likhoslavl and 70 kilometres from Tver, Russia.

== History and collection ==
The museum was founded in 1981 by Ivan Vasilyevich Zorin, a native of Pervitinsky Krai, the first «Honorary Citizen of Likhoslavl District». As a participant of the Great Patriotic War of 1941-1945 against nazi, with four wounds and 35 years of service in the Armed Forces of the USSR, he devoted himself to local history and preservation of historical heritage. Today the museum bears his name.

The exhibits and documents of the museum tell about the people and the three hundred year history of the village of Pervitino, as well as some of the nearby villages and estates of the Tver region. The main part of the museum is devoted to the history of the twentieth century. As early as 1904, a Social Democratic group was created in Pervitino, and peasants from the Pervitino and surrounding villages actively participated in it. The materials of the museum tell about the peasant movement of 1905-1910, about the events of the revolution of 1917, the formation of the commune in Pervitino in 1918, then the F. Dzerzhinsky collective farm in the early 1930s.

A special section of the museum is devoted to the military and labor feat of the countrymen during the Great Patriotic War of 1941-1945. Of the 500 residents of Pervitino and the surrounding villages that went to the front, 330 did not return at home.

The materials of the museum tells about the feat of the pilot Alexei Sevastyanov (1917-1942), the Hero of the Soviet Union, who committed the first night ram in the skies over Leningrad in November 1941. Today the streets in St. Petersburg and Pervitino bear his name. In 1966, a monument to A. T. Sevastyanov by sculptor Alexander Chernetsky was opened in Pervitino. The museum exhibits a genuine machine gun Sevastyanova, found in 1971, along with the remains of the pilot and his aircraft.

A large section of the exposition tells about the representatives of the Shishkov and Khvostov noble families who owned Pervitino in the XVIII - XX centuries, about the historical ensemble of the Pervitino estate, including the main house built in the first half of the XIX century, about of the Trinity Church with murals build in 1794, about the church fence and the remains of the park, which were recognized as monuments of history and culture of federal significance. All these architectural monuments are located within walking distance of the museum.

After a large-scale reconstruction, the Pervitinsky Museum opened its doors again on March 28, 2015.

== Gallery ==
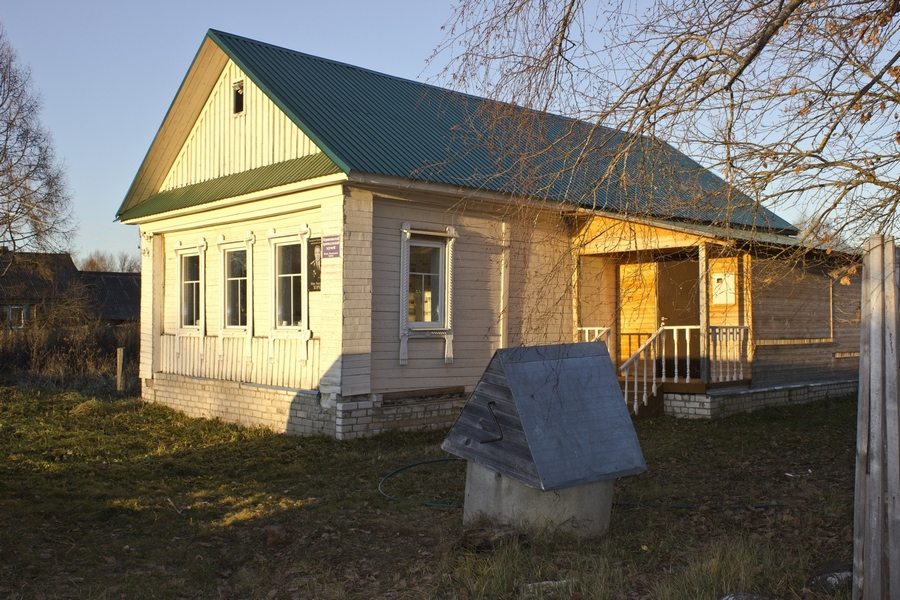
Building of the Pervitino local history museum.

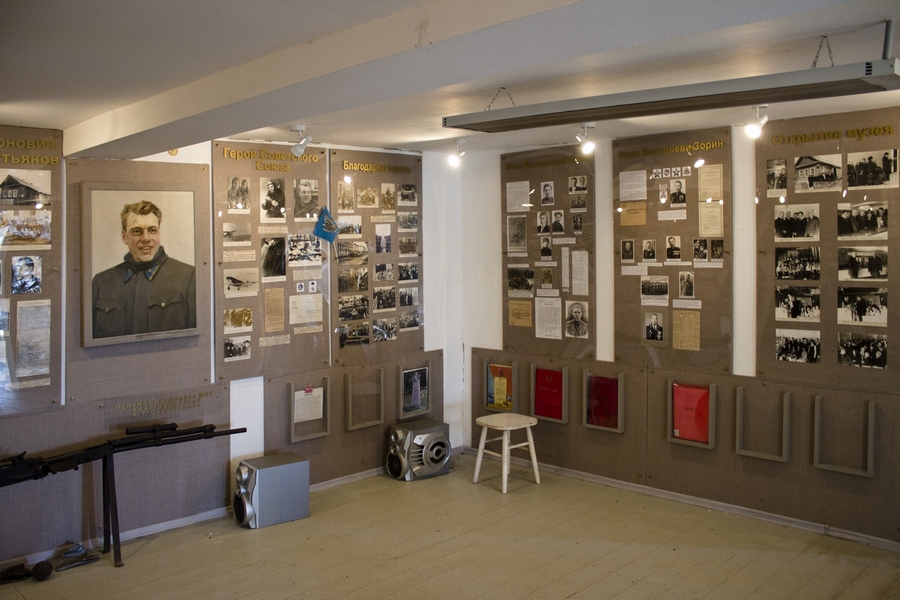
Exposition of the Pervito local history museum.

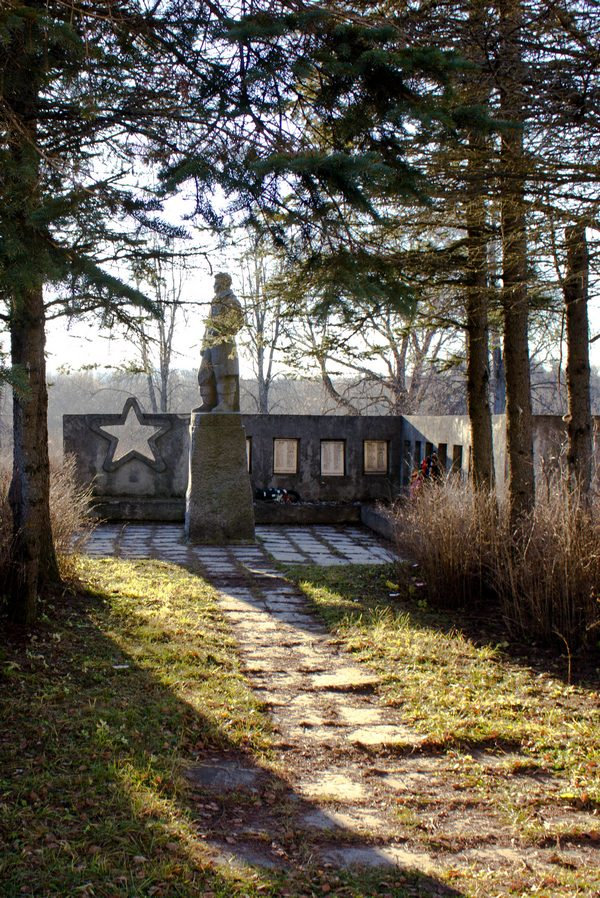
War memorial and monument to the Hero of the Soviet Union Alexei Sevastyanov (1917-1942).

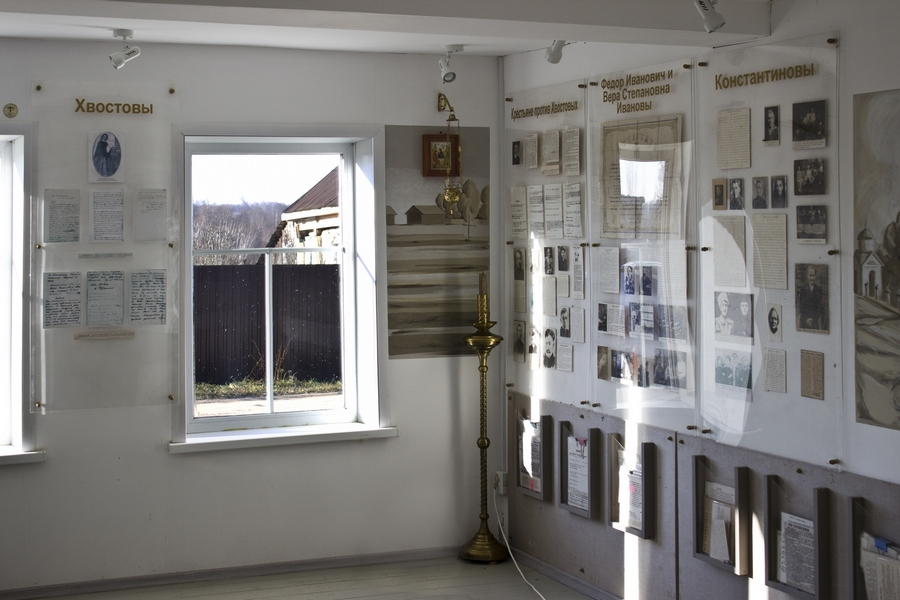
Exposition of the Pervito local history museum.

== See also ==
- Pervitino, Likhoslavlsky District, Tver Oblast
- Pervitino estate
- Trinity Church, Pervitino

== Sources ==
- Добровольский И. Тверской епархиальный статистический сборник. Тверь, 1901, №11.
- Тверская область. Энциклопедический справочник. Тверь, 1994.
- Тверской край в XX веке: Документы и материалы. Вып. 2: 1907 г. – февраль 1917 г. Тверь, 1995.
- Тверская деревня. Т.1. Лихославльский район. Энциклопедия. Тверь, 2001. C.418-419.
- Из рода Хвостовых: Жизнь одной семьи из рода Хвостовых / Сост. Г. Г. Иванова. Калининград-Лихославль, 2003.
- В забытых усадьбах. Очерки по истории тверской дворянской корпорации. Тверь, 2014.
- Судьба усадьбы — общая забота и боль // Наша жизнь, газета администрации Лихославльского района Тверской области, 21 декабря 2018.
