= Tukhin =

Rural locality in Kalininsky District, Tver Oblast, Russia

Coordinates: 56°51′16″N 35°28′05″E

Tukhin (Russian: Тухинь) is a village in Kalininsky District of Tver Oblast, Russia.
