= Pervitino estate =

Estate in Tver Oblast, Russia

Coordinates: 57°07′55.04″N 35°40′26.46″E

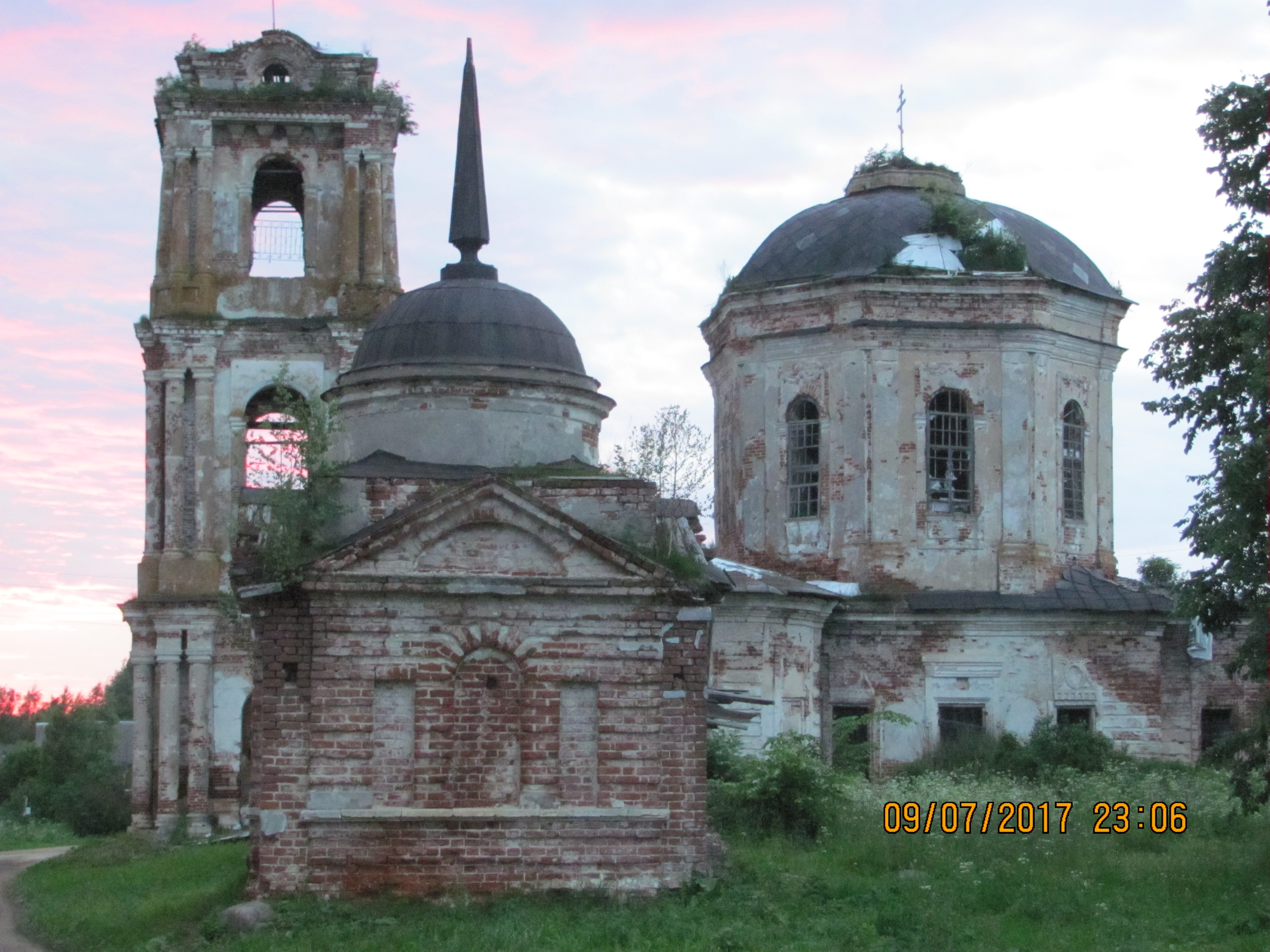
Trinity Church in the estate Pervitino

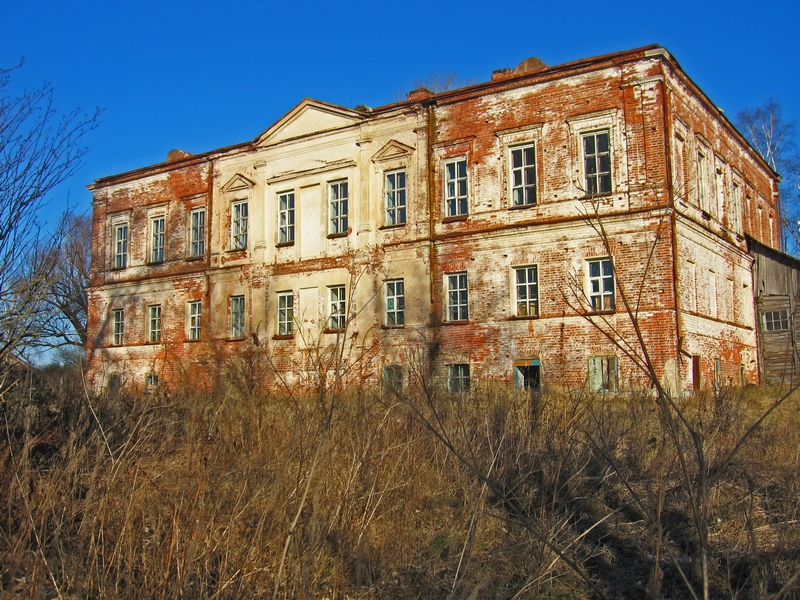
The main house of the estate Pervitino

Pervitino (Russian: Первитино) is an estate located in Pervitino village in 15 kilometres from Likhoslavl, Tver Oblast, Russia, on the left bank of the Kava river. Known since the 18th century as the ancestral estate of the nobility Shishkov, Khvostov, and Rimsky-Korsakov.

== History ==
The ensemble of the Pervitino estate includes the main building of the first half of the 19th century, the Trinity Church with a bell tower built in 1794, architectural elements of the church fence and the remains of a park. All elements as the ensemble of the estate Pervitino as a whole are protected by the Russian state as objects of the historical and cultural heritage of the peoples of the Russian Federation of federal significance. The ensemble of the Pervitino estate, including the main building of the manor and the Trinity Cathedral, is currently need of repair and reconstruction.

In the local Pervitino local history museum (village Pervitino, Sevastyanova street, 14) a rich material on the history of the estate was collected.

== See also ==
- Pervitino, Likhoslavlsky District, Tver Oblast
- Trinity Church, Pervitino
- Pervitino local history museum

== Sources ==
- Тверская область. Энциклопедический справочник. Тверь, 1994.
- Тверской край в XX веке: Документы и материалы. Вып. 2: 1907 г. – февраль 1917 г. Тверь, 1995.
- Тверская деревня. Т.1. Лихославльский район. Энциклопедия. Тверь, 2001. C.418-419.
- Из рода Хвостовых: Жизнь одной семьи из рода Хвостовых. Сост. Г. Г. Иванова. Калининград-Лихославль, 2003.
- В забытых усадьбах. Очерки по истории тверской дворянской корпорации. Тверь, 2014.

== Gallery ==
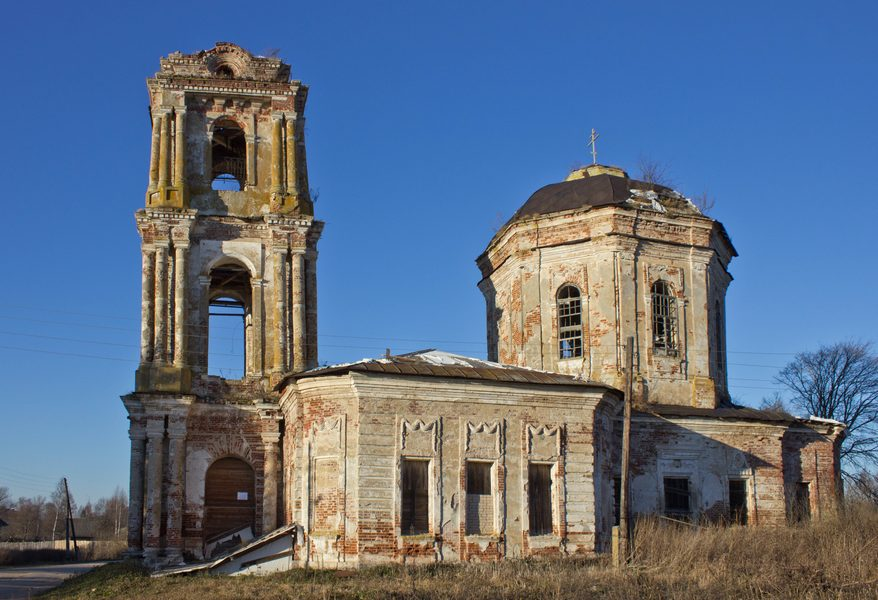
Trinity Church in Pervitino of 1794.

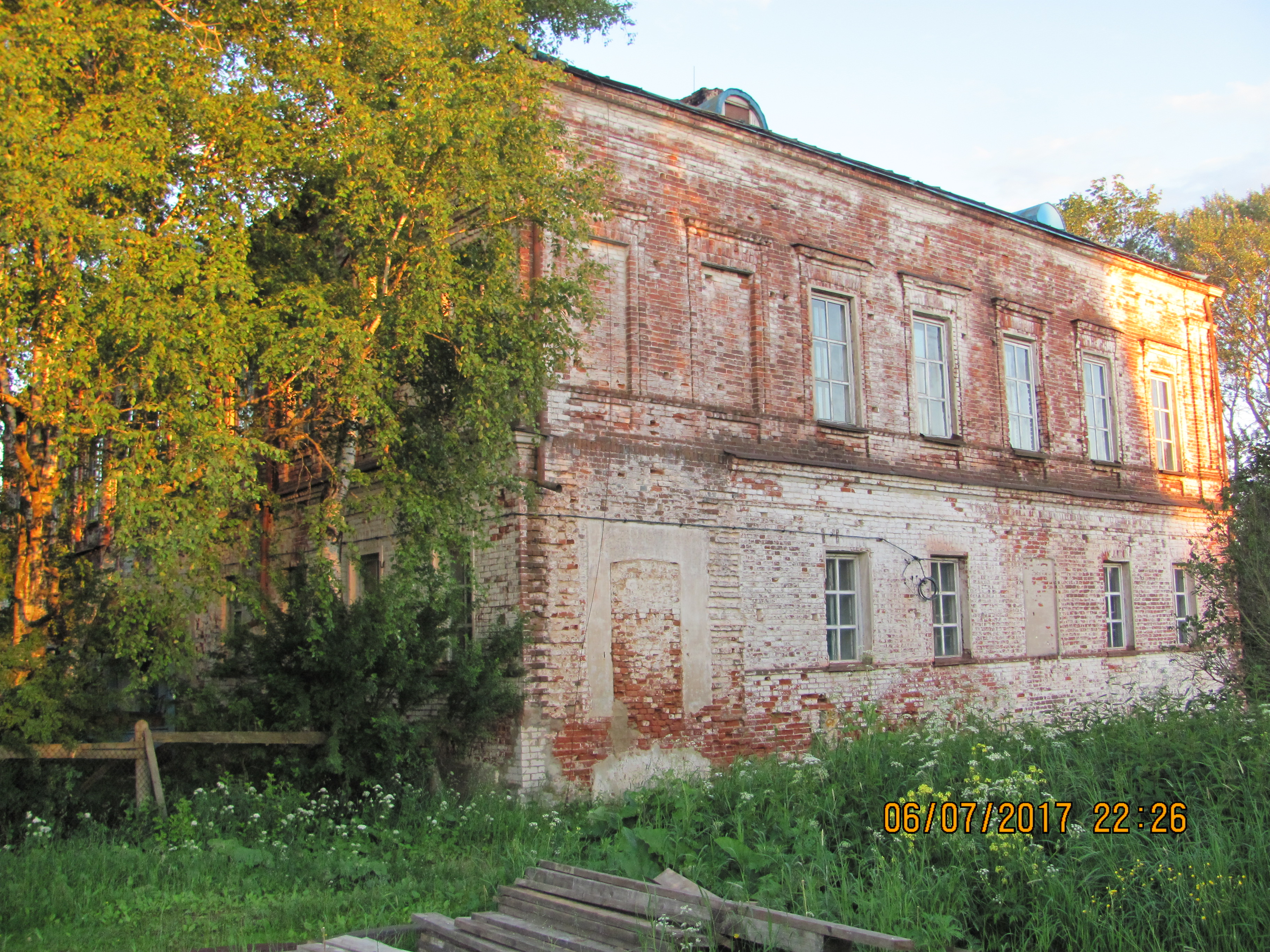
Northern side of the main house of the manor Pervitino

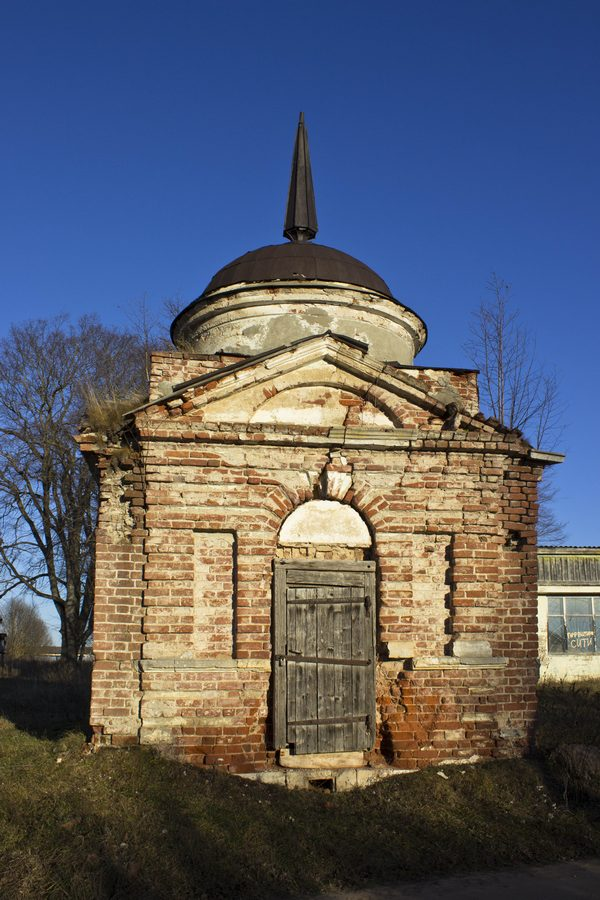
Corner tower of the church fence. First half of the 19th Century.
