= Trinity Church, Pervitino =

Trinity Church
- Церковь Троицы Живоначальной
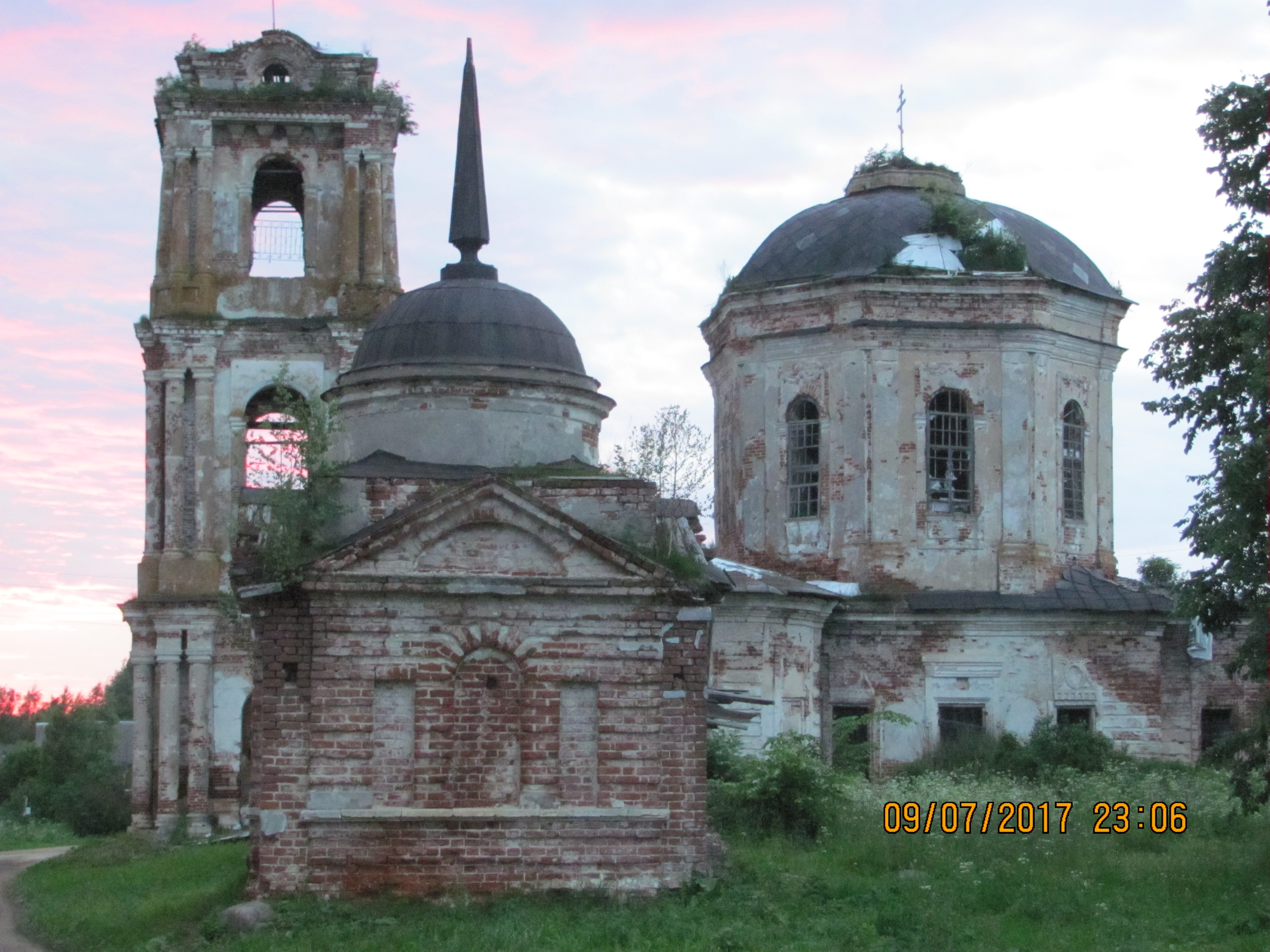
- Trinity Church
- 57°07′55″N 35°40′26″E
- Location: Pervitino estate
- Country: Russia
- Denomination: Russian Orthodox

Architecture
- Style: Russian architecture
- Groundbreaking: 1785
- Completed: 1794

Trinity Church (Russian: Церковь Троицы Живоначальной), founded by Alexander Shishkov in 1785 and consecrated in 1794, is the oldest surviving building of Pervitino estate, located in the central part of the Pervitino village in 15 kilometres from Likhoslavl, Tver Oblast, Russia, on the left bank of the Kava river. Modern address: Tver region, Likhoslavl district, village Pervitino, st. Sevastyanova, 31.

== History ==
The Trinity Church with murals was erected in 1785-1794 at the expense of the owner of the Pervitino manor Alexander Fedorovich Shishkov. Consecrated in 1794. The architectural style combines elements of late baroque and classicism. The building is a longline type of church (octagon on quadrangle), the refectory is made in connection with the bell tower. A remarkable example of provincial architecture of the XVIII century.

At the beginning of the 19th century, the Pervitino manor passed to the Khvostov family, which was closely related to the Shishkov family. Its first owner was the captain of artillery Nikolai Petrovich Khvostov. (1748-1829). He organized the purchase of new bells, as well as the construction of a stone fence around the Trinity Church.

After the 1917 revolution, the church was closed, services were not held. The building was used for economic needs of the Pervitinsk commune, then the F. Dzerzhinsky collective farm. Carved gilded iconostas of the middle of XIX century and the interior decor of the Trinity Church were lost.

Since 1974 the Trinity Church in Pervitino estate was designated by the Russian government as an architectural monument of federal significance (#691610586700006). In the same year the four corner towers of the stone fence of the Trinity Church were also included in the list of cultural heritage to be protected as monuments of national importance (#691610600190036).

In 2018, thanks to the Sergiy Srebryansky Foundation, a chapel was organized at the Trinity Church and a service was held for the first time in a hundred years.

Restoration work in the Trinity Church was not carried out. The murals of the dome and walls are partially lost due to desolation and vandalism. The object of cultural and historical heritage of federal importance needs urgent measures to prevent further destruction.

== Gallery ==
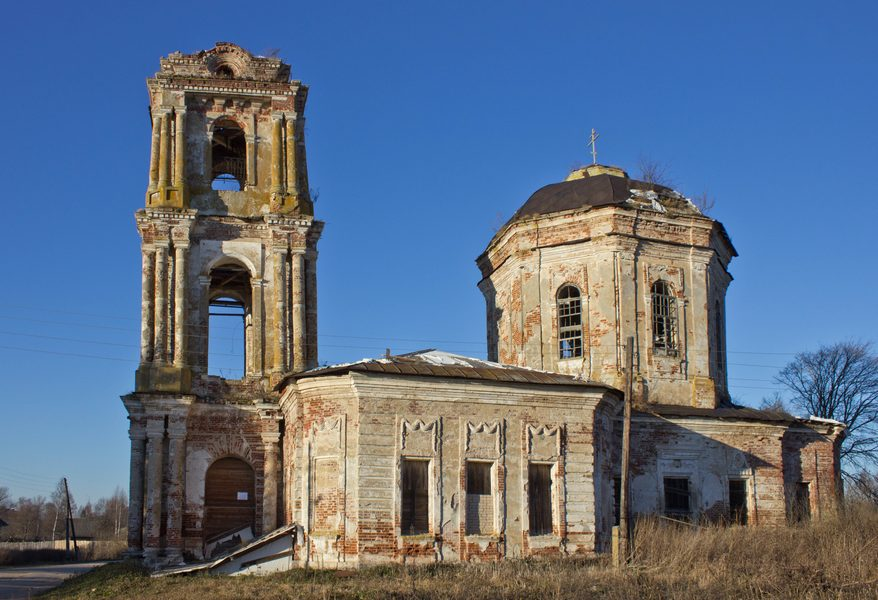
Trinity Church in Pervitino of 1794.

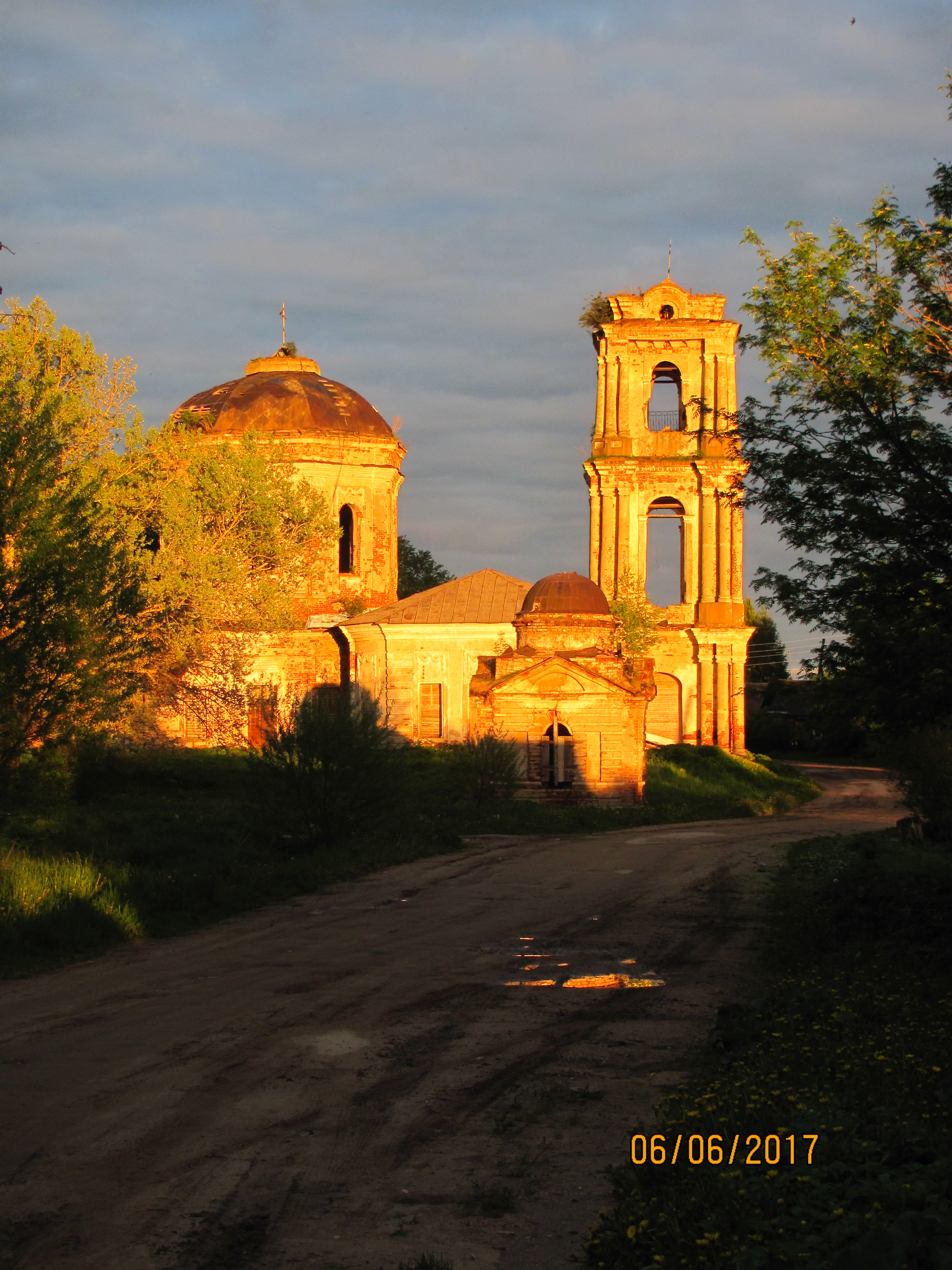
Trinity Church with bell tower and corner tower of the fence.

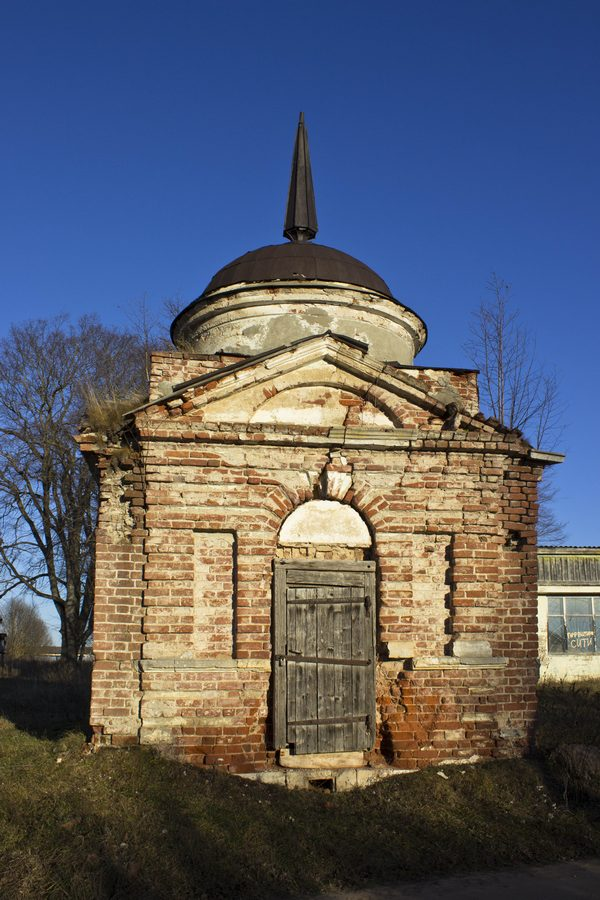
Corner tower of the church fence. First half of the 19th Century.

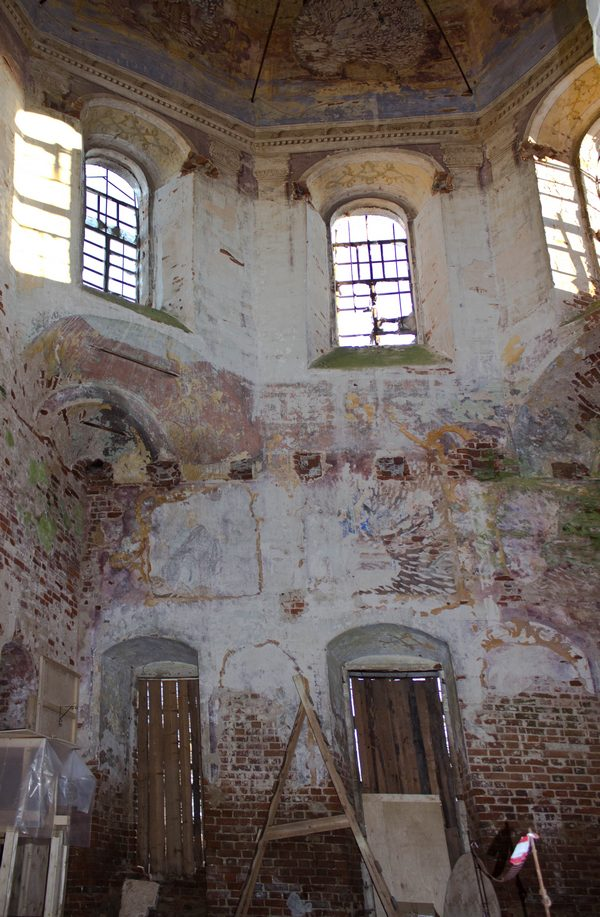
Interior view of the Trinity Church in Pervitino.

== See also ==
- Pervitino, Likhoslavlsky District, Tver Oblast
- Pervitino estate
- Pervitino local history museum

== Sources ==
- Добровольский И. Тверской епархиальный статистический сборник. Тверь, 1901, No.11.
- Постановлением Совета Министров РСФСР No. 624 от 04.12.1974 «О дополнении и частичном изменении постановления Совета Министров РСФСР от 30 августа 1960 года № 1327 «О дальнейшем улучшении дела охраны памятников культуры в РСФСР».
- Тверская область. Энциклопедический справочник. Тверь, 1994.
