= Yogna =

Rural locality in Vesyegonsky District, Tver Oblast, Russia

Coordinates: 58°41′N 36°53′E

Yogna (Russian: Ёгна) is a rural locality (a selo) in Vesyegonsky District of Tver Oblast, Russia.
