= Viglino =

Rural locality in Lesnoy District, Tver Oblast, Russia

Coordinates: 58°15′N 35°20′E

Viglino (Russian: Ви́глино) is a village in Lesnoy District of Tver Oblast, Russia.
