= Abakanovo, Vologodsky District, Vologda Oblast =

Abakanovo Абаканово
- Village
- Location within Vologda Oblast Location within Russia
- Coordinates: 59°17′N 39°49′E
- Country: Russia
- Region: Vologda Oblast
- District: Vologodsky District
- Time zone: UTC+3:00

Abakanovo (Russian: Абаканово) is a rural locality (a village) in Semyonkovskoye Rural Settlement of Vologodsky District, Russia. The population was 2 as of 2002.

== Geography ==
Abakanovo is located 12 km north of Vologda (the district's administrative centre) by road. Petrakovo is the nearest rural locality.
