= Uleyki =

Rural locality in Oleninsky District, Tver Oblast, Russia

Uleyki (Russian: Улейки) is a village in Oleninsky District of Tver Oblast, Russia.
