= Ustrovka =

Rural locality in Sandovsky District, Tver Oblast, Russia

Coordinates: 58°19′N 36°36′E

Ustrovka (Russian: Устровка) is a village in Sandovsky District of Tver Oblast, Russia.
