= Abakanovo, Kaduysky District, Vologda Oblast =

Abakanovo Абаканово
- Village
- Location within Vologda Oblast Location within Russia
- Coordinates: 59°29′N 37°01′E
- Country: Russia
- Region: Vologda Oblast
- District: Kaduysky District
- Time zone: UTC+3:00

Abakanovo (Russian: Абаканово) is a rural locality (a village) in Nikolskoye Rural Settlement of Kaduysky District, Russia. The population was 10 as of 2002.

== Geography ==
Abakanovo is located 43 km north of Kaduy (the district's administrative centre) by road. Seninskaya is the nearest rural locality.
