= Moskva, Tver Oblast =

Rural locality in Penovsky District, Tver Oblast, Russia

Coordinates: 56°55′05″N 32°09′49″E

Moskva (Russian: Москва́) is a village in Penovsky District of Tver Oblast, Russia, located on the shore of Ordonikolskoye Lake.

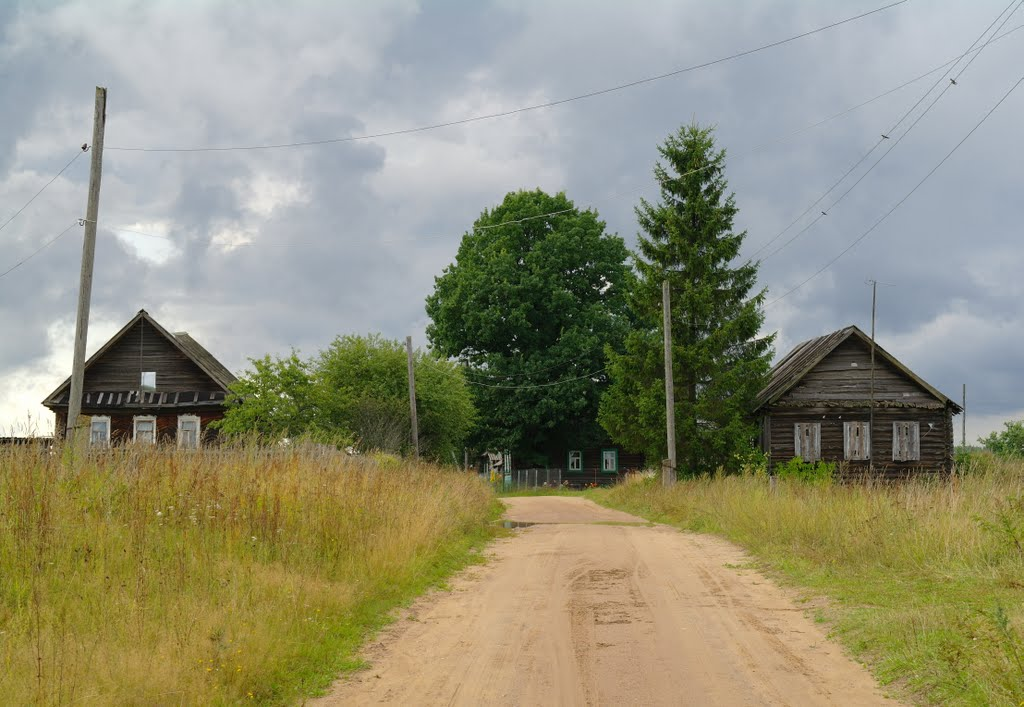
Moskva

In 1859, the village was a part of Ostashkovsky Uyezd of Tver Governorate and had a population of 48 (23 males and 25 females) comprising five households.
