= Svirka =

Svirka Свирка
- Village (selo)
- Interactive map of Svirka
- Location of Svirka Svirka (Tver Oblast)
- Coordinates: 58°01′N 34°35′E
- Country: Russia
- Federal subject: Tver Oblast
- Administrative district: Udomelsky District
- Selsoviet: Mstinsky Selsoviet
- Elevation: 171 m (561 ft)

Population
  - Estimate (2010): 13 )
- Time zone: UTC+3 (MSK)
- Postal code: 171866
- Dialing code: +7 48255
- OKTMO ID: 28751000722

Svirka (Russian: Свирка) is a village in Udomelsky District of Tver Oblast, Russia.

In the 19th century, the village was part of Vyshnevolotsky Uyezd, Tver Governorate. In 1859 the village had 19 households with 60 men and 70 women living there.
