= Bormino =

Village in Tver Oblast, Russia

Coordinates: 57°45′13″N 36°36′01″E

Bormino (Russian: Бормино) is a village in Bezhetsky District of Tver Oblast, Russia.
