= Yurino, Tver Oblast =

Rural locality in Kashinsky District, Tver Oblast, Russia

Coordinates: 57°28′37″N 37°30′39″E

Yurino (Russian: Ю́рино) is a rural locality (a village) in Kashinsky District of Tver Oblast, Russia. It is located close to the villages of Miloslavskoye, Zlobino, and Buzykovo. Situated along the banks of the Kashinka River, it is 138 meters above sea level.

== History, ==
In the 1677 Kashin census, Yurino was mentioned as belonging to the solicitor P. F. Pleshcheev. In 1781, it consisted of four households with a total of 28 residents and belonged to Dmitry Vasilyevich and Praskovya Andreevna Arsenyev. In 1851, the village had grown to 14 household with 108 inhabitants, and was recorded at peak population in 1888 with 343 people.
