= Chistaya Dubrova =

Rural locality in Vesyegonsky District, Tver Oblast, Russia

Coordinates: 58°30′N 37°17′E

Chistaya Dubrova (Russian: Чистая Дуброва) is a rural locality (a selo) in Vesyegonsky District of Tver Oblast, Russia.
