= 1st May, Tver Oblast =

1st May 1-е Мая
- Settlement
- Location within Tver Oblast Location within Russia
- Coordinates: 56.853333°N 36.690278°E
- Country: Russia
- Region: Tver Oblast
- District: Konakovsky District
- Time zone: UTC+03:00

1st May (Russian: 1-е Ма́я, romanized: Pervoye Maya) is a rural locality (a settlement) and the administrative center of Pervomayskoye Rural Settlement of Konakovsky District, Russia. The population was 694 in 2008.

== Geography ==
The settlement is located on the Soz River, 45 km north of Konakovo (the district's administrative center) by road. Karpovskoye is the nearest rural locality.

== Streets ==
- s/t Zarya Territoriya
