= Badachyovo =

Rural locality in Vesyegonsky District, Tver Oblast, Russia

Coordinates: 58°42′N 37°12′E

Badachyovo (Russian: Бадачёво) is a village in Vesyegonsky District of Tver Oblast, Russia.
