= Gryada =

Rural locality in Bezhetsky District, Tver Oblast, Russia

Gryada (Russian: Гряда́) is a village in Bezhetsky District of Tver Oblast, Russia.
