= Lvovskoye, Tver Oblast =

Rural locality in Tver Oblast, Russia

Lvovskoye (Russian: Льво́вское) is a village in Sandovsky District of Tver Oblast, Russia.
