= Mednoye, Tver Oblast =

Village in Kalininsky District, Tver Oblast, Russia

Mednoye Медное
- Selo
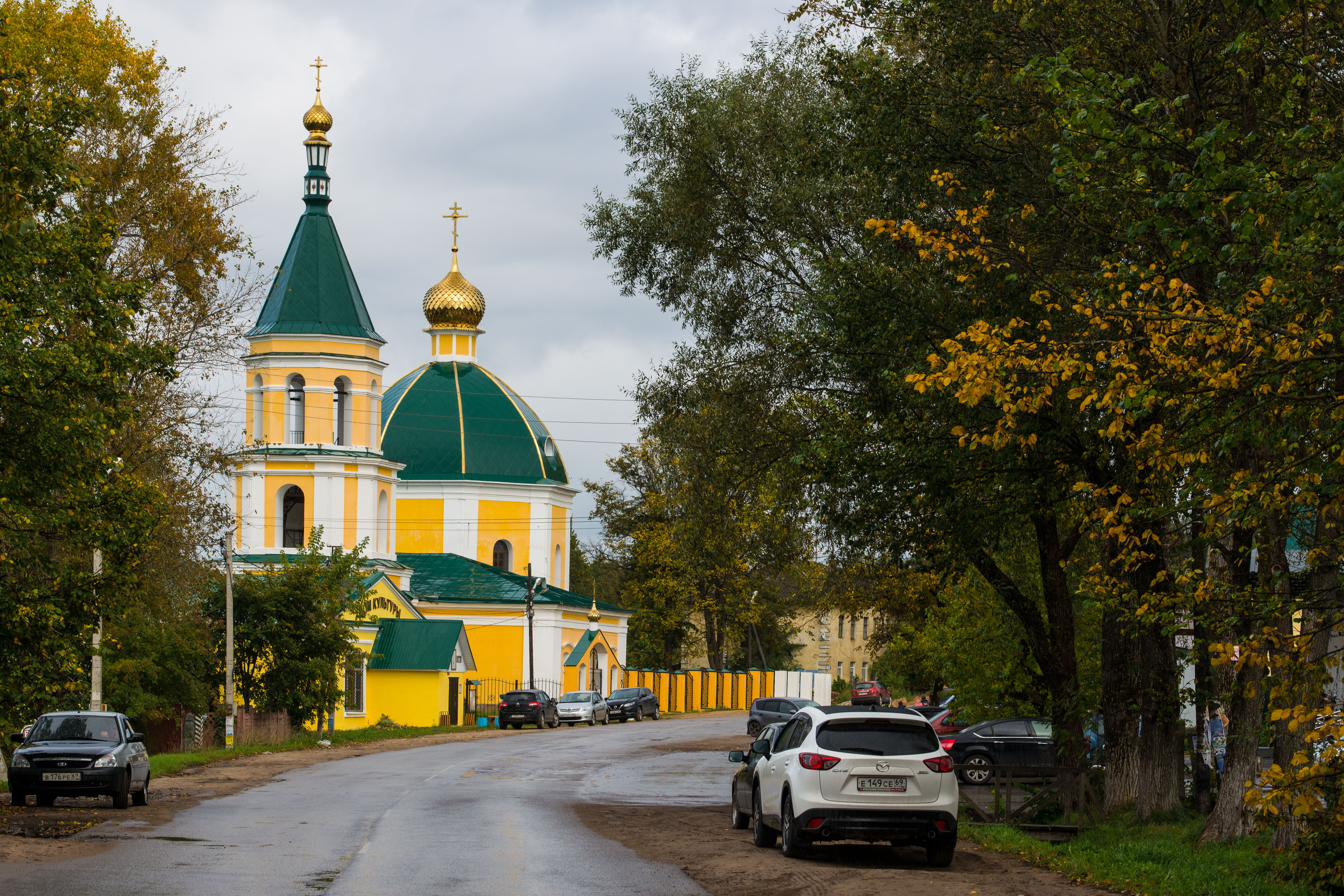
- Interactive map of Mednoye
- Location of Mednoye Mednoye (European Russia) Mednoye (Tver Oblast)
- Coordinates: 56°55′42″N 35°28′35″E
- Country: Russia
- Federal subject: Tver Oblast
- Administrative district: Kalininsky District
- First mentioned: 1340

Population (2010 Census)
  - Total: 2,645
  - Estimate (2010): 2,645 (0%)

Municipal status
  - Urban settlement: Mednovskoye Rural Settlement
- Time zone: UTC+3 (MSK)
- Postal code: 170521
- OKTMO ID: 28620438101

Mednoye (Russian: Медное) is a village in Kalininsky District of Tver Oblast, Russia, located on the Tvertsa River, 28 km west of Tver, by the Moscow–St.Petersburg highway. Population: 3,047 (1992).

== History ==
Mednoye was first mentioned as a votchina of one of Tver boyars in some documents dating from the 14th century. In the 15th and 16th centuries, the village prospered due to its location on the road leading from Tver to Torzhok and Novgorod. During the Oprichnina, there were 104 households in the village.

In the 19th century, Mednoye was a post station on the route from Moscow to St. Petersburg. One chapter of Alexander Radishchev's Journey from St. Petersburg to Moscow is dedicated specifically to this village.

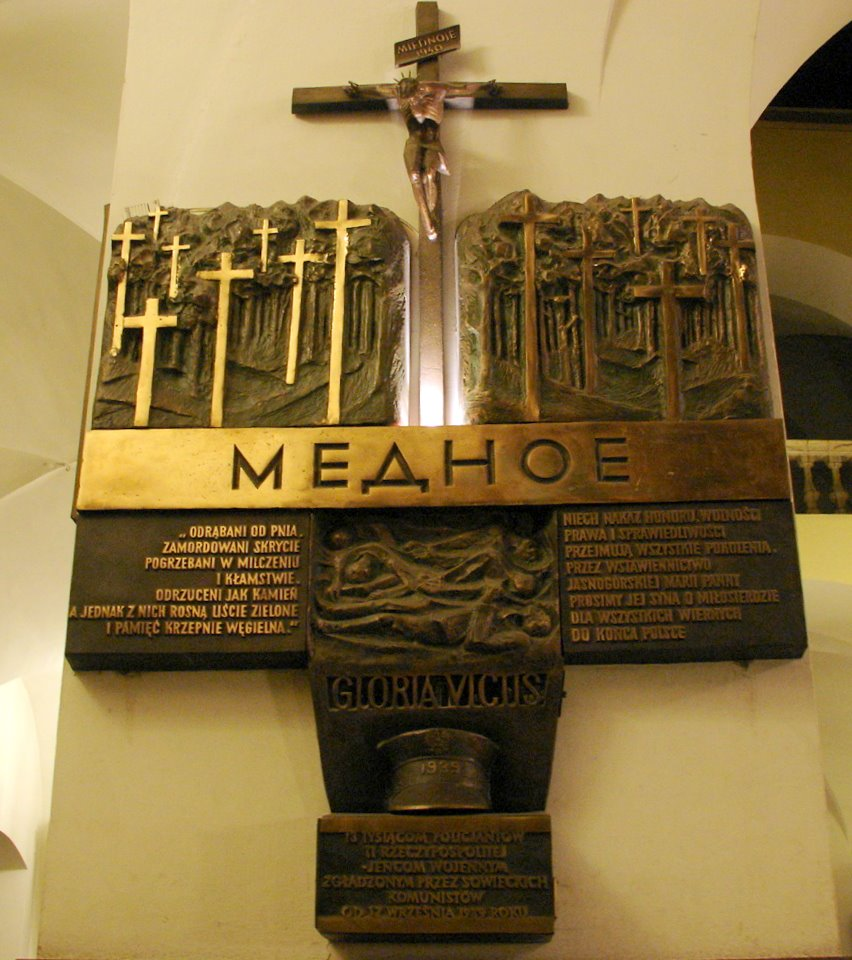
A plaque commemorating the massacre in Mednoye (Jasna Góra, Częstochowa, Poland)

During World War II Mednoye was a centre of heavy tank fighting (October 1941) which formed part of the Battle of Moscow. It also became known as a NKVD mass execution site. Between April 3 and April 19, 1940, 6,311 Polish officers from the Ostashkov POW camp were brought to the area of Mednoye and subsequently shot to death behind the village of Yamka during the Katyn massacre.

== Sights ==
Apart from the Katyn war cemetery, the landmarks of Mednoye include the Church of Our Lady of Kazan (1764), the 18th-century post station, and the memorial house of Sergey Lemeshev.
