= Pervitino, Likhoslavlsky District, Tver Oblast =

Rural locality in Tver Oblast, Russia

Coordinates: 57°07′55.04″N 35°40′26.46″E

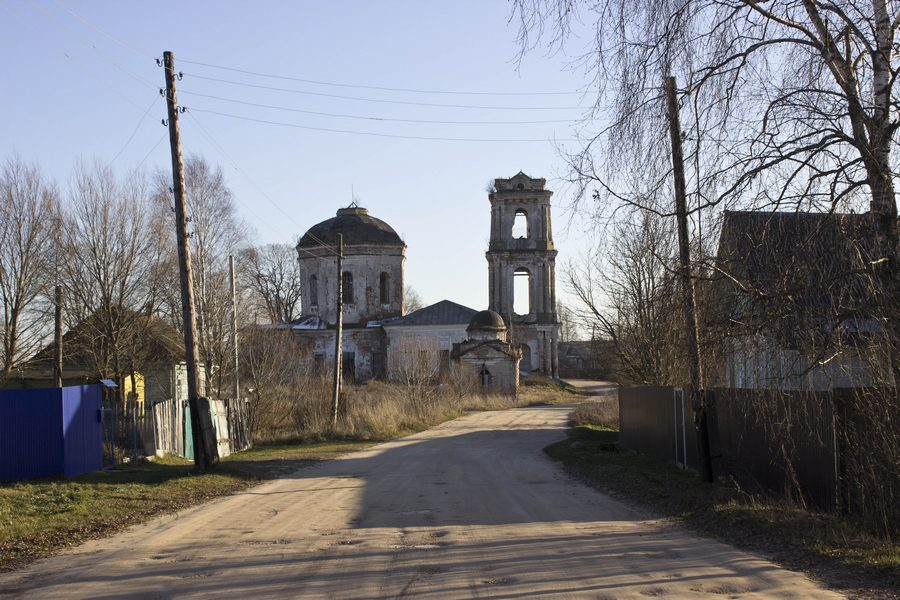
Pervitino village

Pervitino (Russian: Первитино) is a rural locality (a village) in 15 kilometres from Likhoslavl, Tver Oblast, Russia, on the left bank of the Kava river.

== History ==
Pervitino known since the 18th century as the ancestral estate of the nobility Shishkov, Khvostov, and Rimsky-Korsakov. According to the 2010 census, the population of Pervitino was 261 people.

The historical ensemble of the Pervitino includes the main estate building of the first half of the 19th century, the Trinity Church with a bell tower of 1794, architectural elements of the church fence and the remains of a park. All elements as the historical ensemble of the estate Pervitino as a whole are protected by the Russian state as objects of the historical and cultural heritage of the peoples of the Russian Federation of federal significance.

In the local Pervitino local history museum (village Pervitino, Sevastyanova street, 14) a rich material on the history of the Pervitino village was collected.

== Economy ==
The basis of the economy and employment of the population in Pervitino has traditionally been agriculture. After the revolution in 1918, an agricultural commune arose in Pervitino, which was later transformed into a collective farm named after Dzerzhinsky.

== Culture and recreation ==
- Pervitino estate of 18th-19th Century.
- Trinity Church of 1794.
- Pervitino local history museum founded in 1981.
- War Memorial and a monument to Hero of Soviet Union A. T. Sevastyanov by sculptor Alexander Chernetsky was opened in 1966.

== Notable people ==
- Arseny Nikolaevich Khvostov, the hero of the Patriotic War of 1812, holder of the orders of St. Anna 2-nd degree, of sv. Vladimir 4th degree, adjutant of field marshal Mikhail Illarionovich Kutuzov and Pyotr Mikhailovich Volkonsky.
- Fedor Ivanovich Ivanov, one of the messengers between the Tver Committee of the RSDLP (b) and the volost peasants, the organizer of the peasants movement against the landowners. In 1937 he was repressed.
- Alexei Tikhonovich Sevastyanov (1917–1942), Hero of the Soviet Union.

== Gallery ==
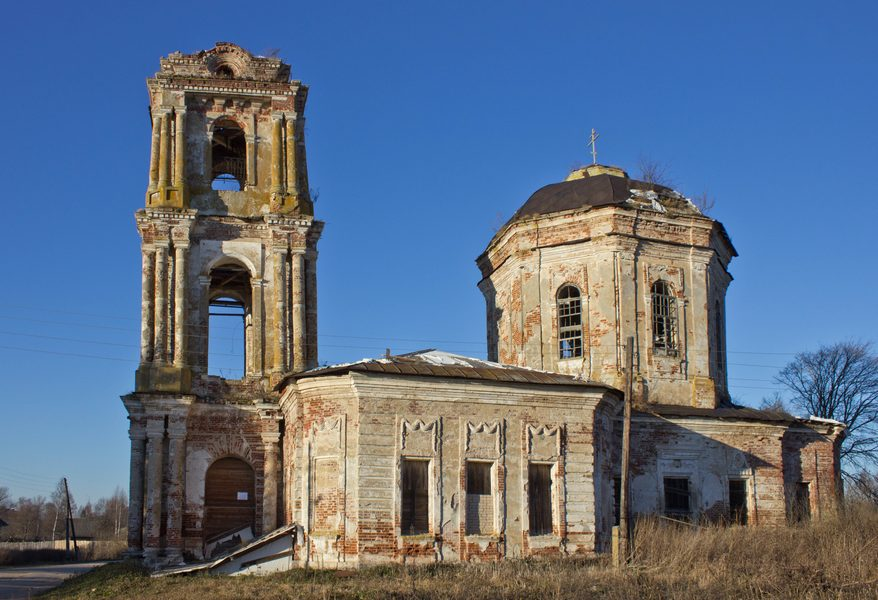
Trinity Church in Pervitino of 1794.

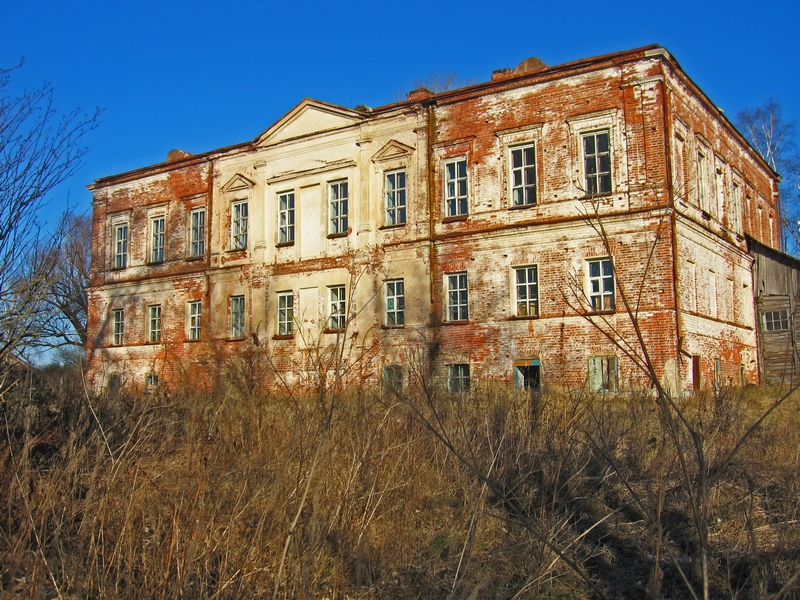
The main house of the estate Pervitino.

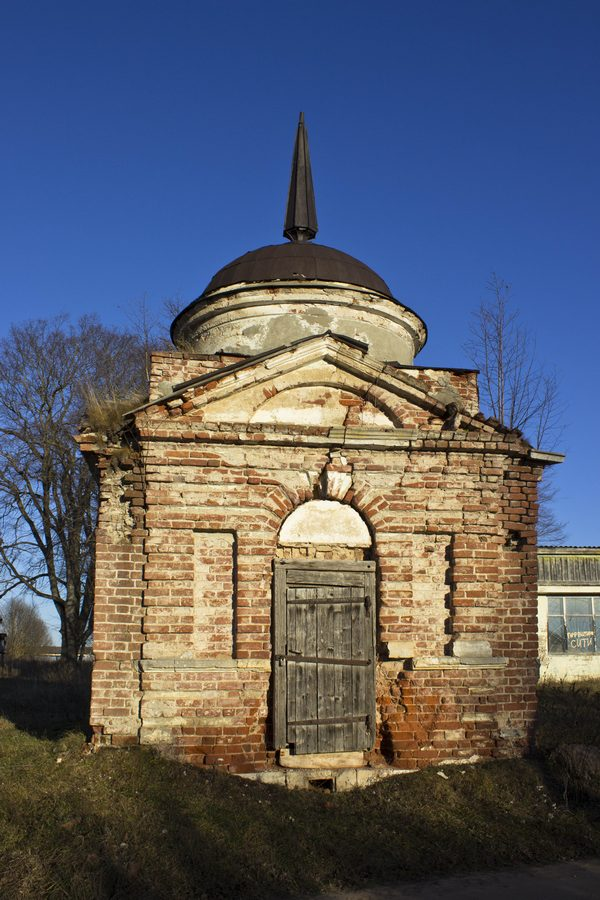
Corner tower of the church fence. First half of the 19th Century.

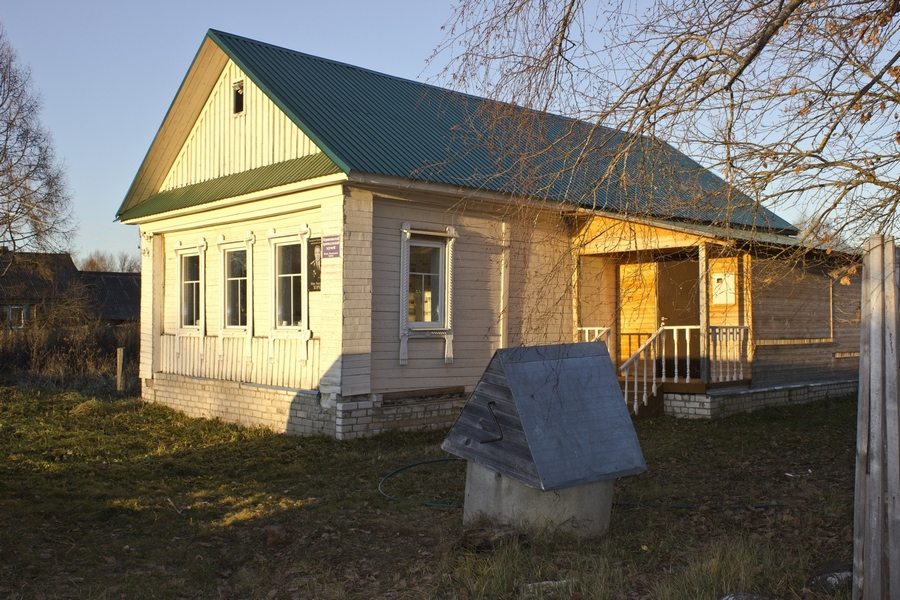
Building of the Pervitino local history museum.

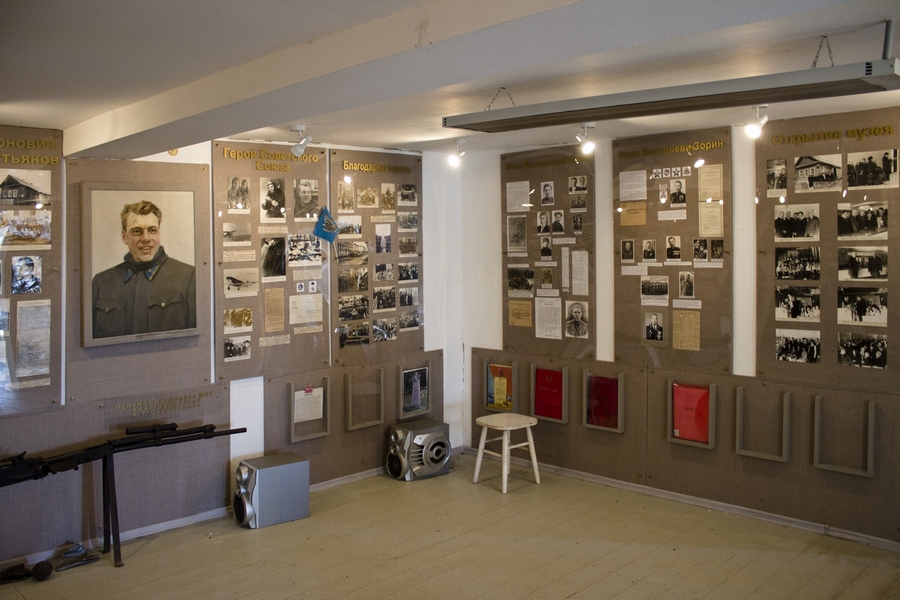
Exposition of the Pervito local history museum.

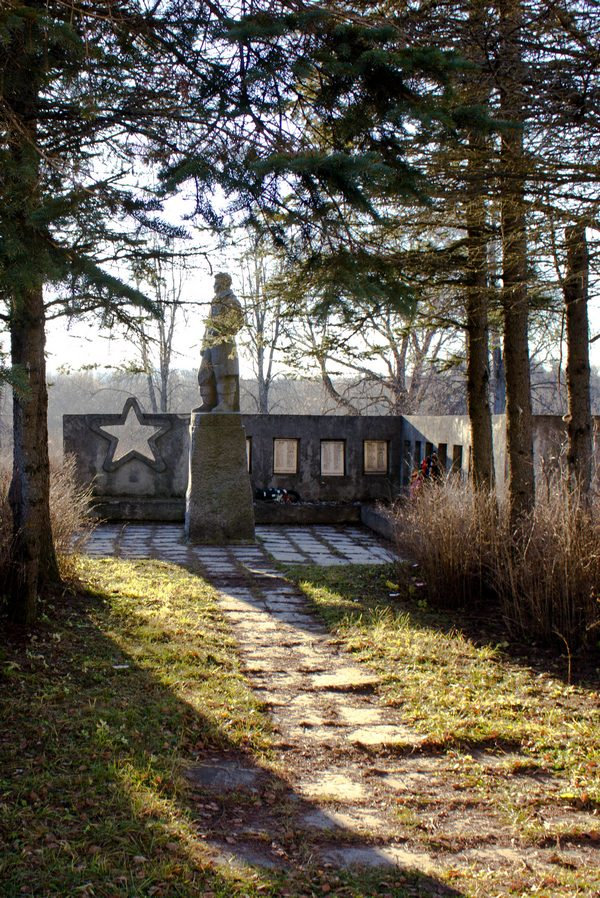
War memorial and monument to the Hero of the Soviet Union Alexei Sevastyanov (1917–1942).

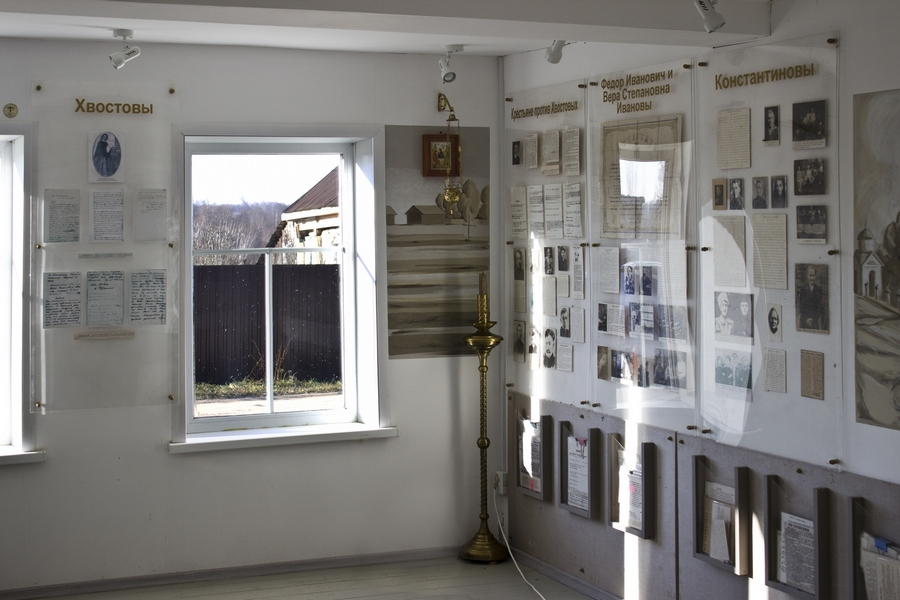
Exposition of the Pervito local history museum.

== See also ==
- Trinity Church, Pervitino
- Pervitino estate
- Pervitino local history museum

== Sources ==
- Тверская область. Энциклопедический справочник. Тверь, 1994.
- Тверской край в XX веке: Документы и материалы. Вып. 2: 1907 г. – февраль 1917 г. Тверь, 1995.
- Тверская деревня. Т.1. Лихославльский район. Энциклопедия. Тверь, 2001. C.418-419.
- Из рода Хвостовых: Жизнь одной семьи из рода Хвостовых. Сост. Г. Г. Иванова. Калининград-Лихославль, 2003.
- В забытых усадьбах. Очерки по истории тверской дворянской корпорации. Тверь, 2014.
- Судьба усадьбы — общая забота и боль // Наша жизнь, газета администрации Лихославльского района Тверской области, 21 декабря 2018 года.
