= Novo, Tver Oblast =

Rural locality in Kuvshinovsky District, Tver Oblast, Russia

Novo (Russian: Но́во) is a village in Kuvshinovsky District of Tver Oblast, Russia.
