= Potyosy =

Rural locality in Bezhetsky District, Tver Oblast, Russia

Coordinates: 57°53′N 36°33′E

Potyosy (Russian: Потёсы) is a village in Bezhetsky District of Tver Oblast, Russia.
