= Mazovo, Tver Oblast =

Rural locality in Tver Oblast, Russia

Coordinates: 57°39′01″N 35°01′46″E

Mazovo (Russian: Мазово) is a village in Vyshnevolotsky District of Tver Oblast, Russia.
