= Lyubini, Bezhetsky District, Tver Oblast =

Rural locality in Bezhetsky District, Tver Oblast, Russia

Coordinates: 57°59′N 36°23′E

Lyubini (Russian: Любини) is a rural locality (a village) located in Bezhetsky District of Tver Oblast, Russia.
