= Borshchevo, Vesyegonsky District, Tver Oblast =

Rural locality in Vesyegonsky District, Tver Oblast, Russia

Coordinates: 58°26′N 37°13′E

Borshchevo (Russian: Борщево) is a village in Vesyegonsky District of Tver Oblast, Russia.
