= Kalininsky District, Tver Oblast =

Kalininsky District Калининский район (Russian)
- District
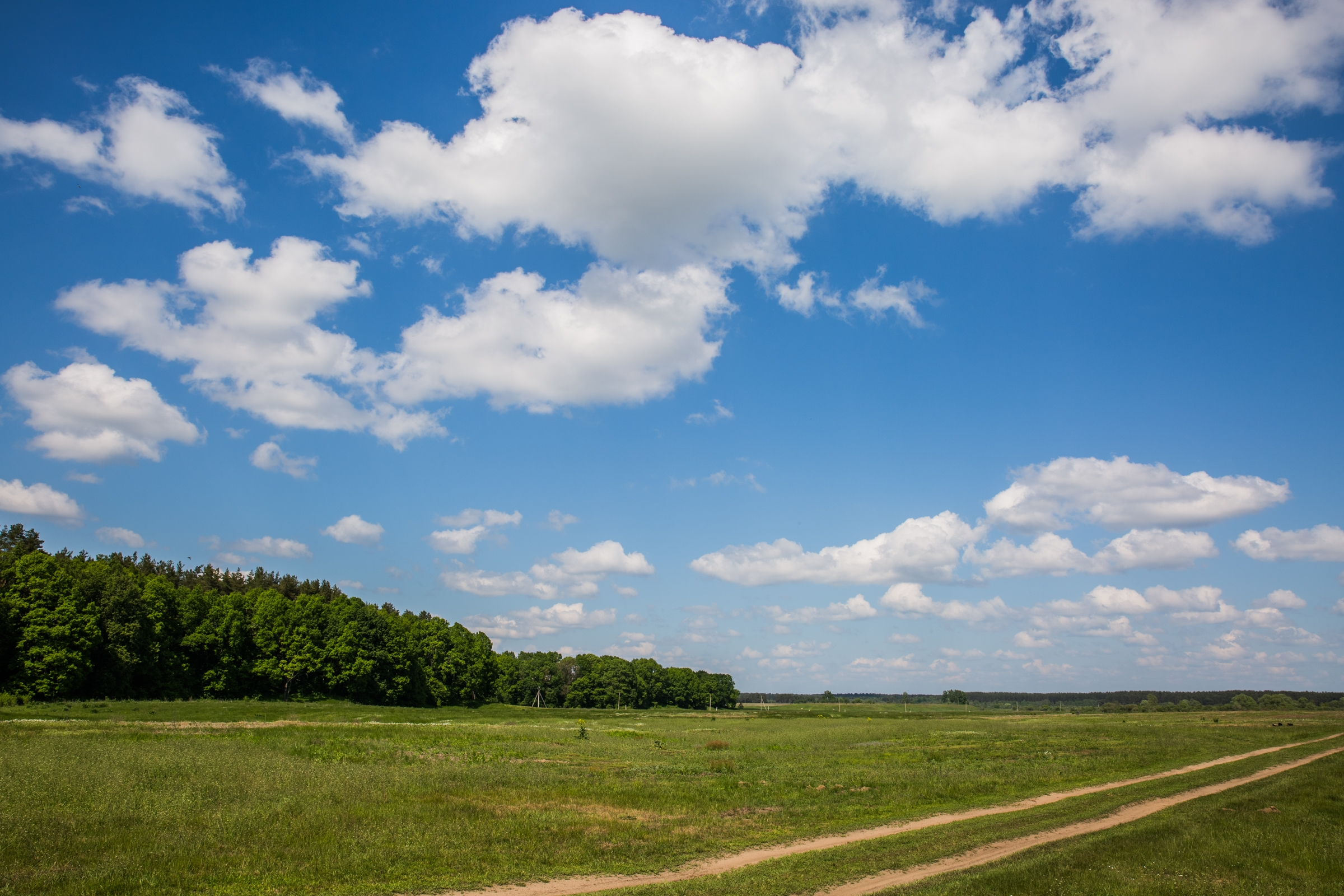
- Dudenevsky Natural Area, Kalininsky District

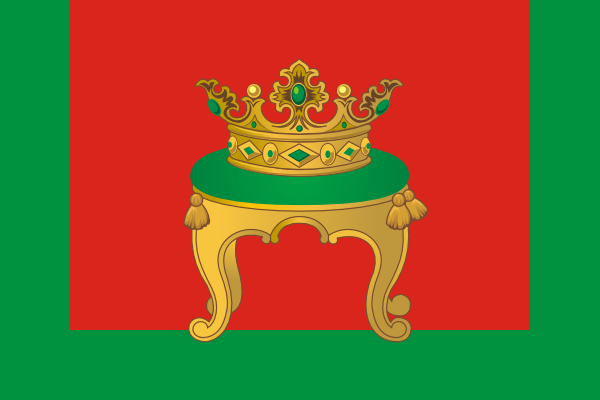
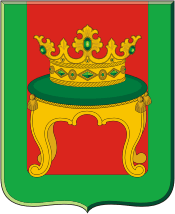
- Flag Coat of arms
- Location of Kalininsky District in Tver Oblast
- Coordinates: 56°51′28″N 35°55′19″E
- Country: Russia
- Federal subject: Tver Oblast
- Established: 1929
- Administrative center: Tver

Area
  - Total: 4,244.7 km^{2} (1,638.9 sq mi)

Population (2010 Census)
  - Total: 52,047
  - Density: 12.262/km^{2} (31.758/sq mi)
  - Urban: 9.7%
  - Rural: 90.3%

Administrative structure
  - Administrative divisions: 15 rural settlement
  - Inhabited localities: 3 urban-type settlements, 566 rural localities

Municipal structure
  - Municipally incorporated as: Kalininsky Municipal District
  - Municipal divisions: 3 urban settlements, 15 rural settlements
- Time zone: UTC+3 (MSK)
- OKTMO ID: 28620000

Kalininsky District (Russian: Кали́нинский райо́н) is an administrative and municipal district (raion), one of the thirty-six in Tver Oblast, Russia. It is located in the south of the oblast and borders with Likhoslavlsky District in the north, Rameshkovsky District in the northeast, Kimrsky District in the east, Konakovsky District in the southeast, Lotoshinsky District of Moscow Oblast in the south, Staritsky District in the southwest, and with Torzhoksky District in the west. The area of the district is 4,244.7 square kilometers (1,638.9 sq mi). Its administrative center is the city of Tver (which is not administratively a part of the district). Population: 52,047 (2010 Census); 54,857 (2002 census); 58,330 (1989 Soviet census).

== Geography ==
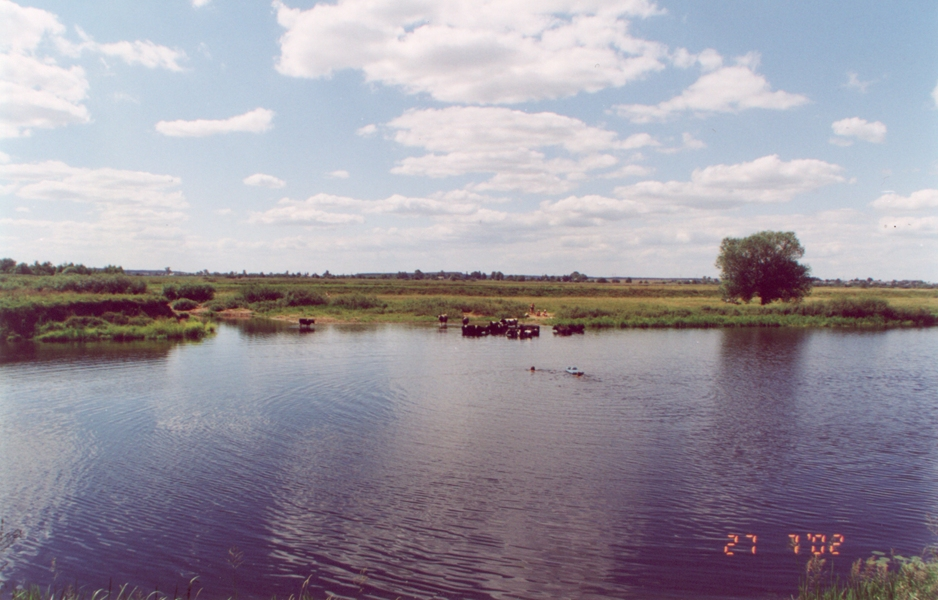
The Shosha River in Turginovo.

The whole area of the district belongs to the drainage basin of the Volga River. The Volga itself crosses the district from northwest to southeast, entering the Ivankovo Reservoir. The biggest tributaries of the Volga within the district are the Tvertsa River (left), which has its mouth in the city of Tver, the Shosha River (right), which crosses the southern part of the district, with the Lama River, a major tributary of the Shosha, forming a stretch of the border between Kalininsky and Konakovsky Districts, and the Soz River (left). The northeastern part of the district, northeast of Tver, is a swamp.

== History ==
In the Middle Ages, the area belonged to Principality of Tver, and in the 14th century was, together with the principality, annexed by the Grand Duchy of Moscow. The trade route between Moscow and Veliky Novgorod crossed the area, and, in particular, Mednoye developed as a rich merchant locality on this route.

In the course of the administrative reform carried out in 1708 by Peter the Great, the area was included into Ingermanlandia Governorate (since 1710 known as Saint Petersburg Governorate). In 1727 it was transferred to newly established Novgorod Governorate. In 1775, Tver Viceroyalty was formed from the lands which previously belonged to Moscow and Novgorod Governorates, and the whole area was transferred to Tver Viceroyalty, which in 1796 was transformed to Tver Governorate. The area belonged to Tverskoy Uyezd.

On July 12, 1929 the governorates and uyezds were abolished. Tverskoy District, with the administrative center in Tver, was established within Tver Okrug of Moscow Oblast. On July 23, 1930, the okrugs were abolished, and the districts were directly subordinated to the oblast. On November 20, 1931 Tver was renamed Kalinin, and consequently Tverskoy District was renamed Kalininsky District. On January 29, 1935 Kalinin Oblast was established, and Kalininsky District was transferred to Kalinin Oblast. During World War II, most of the area of the district was briefly occupied by German troops. By the end of December 1941, the district was back under control of the Soviet authorities. In 1990, Kalinin Oblast was renamed Tver Oblast.

Another district created on July 12, 1929 was Turginovsky District, with the center in the selo of Turginovo. It was a part of Tver Okrug of Moscow Oblast. On January 29, 1935 Turginovsky District was transferred to Kalinin Oblast. On February 1, 1963 Turginovsky District was abolished and merged into Kalininsky District.

On July 12, 1929 Yemelyanovsky District, with the center in the selo of Yemelyanovo was created as well. It was a part of Tver Okrug of Moscow Oblast. On January 29, 1935 Yemelyanovsky District was transferred to Kalinin Oblast. On July 4, 1956 Yemelyanovsky District was abolished and split between Kalininsky, Staritsky, Turginovsky, and Vysokovsky Districts.

On March 5, 1935 Kushalinsky District with the center in the selo of Kushalino was established on the areas previously belonging to Kalininsky and Rameshkovsky Districts. On July 4, 1956 it was abolished and split between Kalininsky, Goritsky, and Rameshkovsky Districts.

On March 5, 1935 Mednovsky District with the center in the selo of Mednoye was established as well on the areas previously belonging to Kalininsky, Likhoslavlsky, and Novotorzhsky Districts. On July 4, 1956 it was abolished and split between Kalininsky and Novotorzhsky Districts.

On September 8, 1937 Orshinsky District with the administrative center in the selo of Rozhdestveno was established in the area which previously belonged to Konakovsky and Zavidovsky Districts. On October 22, 1959 the district was abolished and split between Konakovsky, Kalininsky, and Goritsky Districts.

== Administrative and municipal status ==
Within the framework of administrative divisions, Kalininsky District is one of the thirty-six in the oblast. The city of Tver serves as its administrative center, despite being incorporated separately as an okrug—an administrative unit with the status equal to that of the districts.

As a municipal division, the district is incorporated as Kalininsky Municipal District. Tver Okrug is incorporated separately from the district as Tver Urban Okrug.

== Economy ==
=== Industry ===
The district has several industrial enterprises, producing plastic, copper alloys, and repairing the boat motors. Vasilyevsky Mokh is a center of peat extraction.

=== Agriculture ===
The main agricultural specializations of the district are cattle breeding with meat and milk production and potato growing.

=== Transportation ===
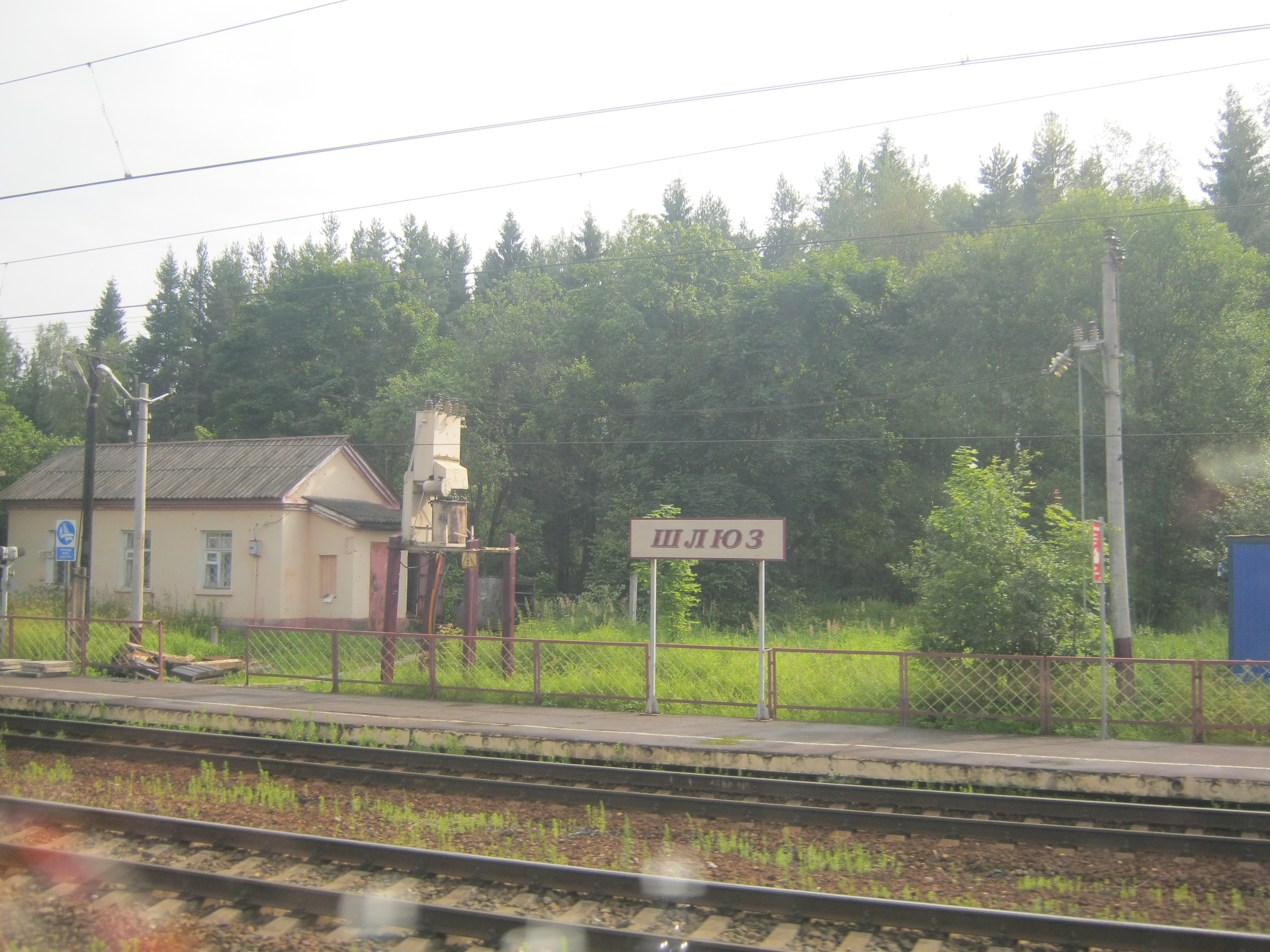
Shlyuz railway station.

The Moscow – Saint Petersburg Railway crosses the district from southeast to northwest, passing Tver. All stations and platforms south of Tver on this line within the district are on the Leningradsky suburban railway line and are connected by regular passenger suburban service with both Moscow (Moscow Leningradsky railway station) and Tver. There is also a railway line from Doroshikha to Vasilyevsky Mokh, however, the passenger traffic to Vasilyevsky Mokh discontinued in 2014, and the line is likely to be demolished.

The M10 highway, which connects Moscow and St. Petersburg, crosses the district from southeast to northwest. Tver is connected by roads with Bezhetsk via Rameshki, with Kimry, with Rzhev via Staritsa, and with Lotoshino by roads, all of which cross the district. There are local roads as well.

== Culture and recreation ==
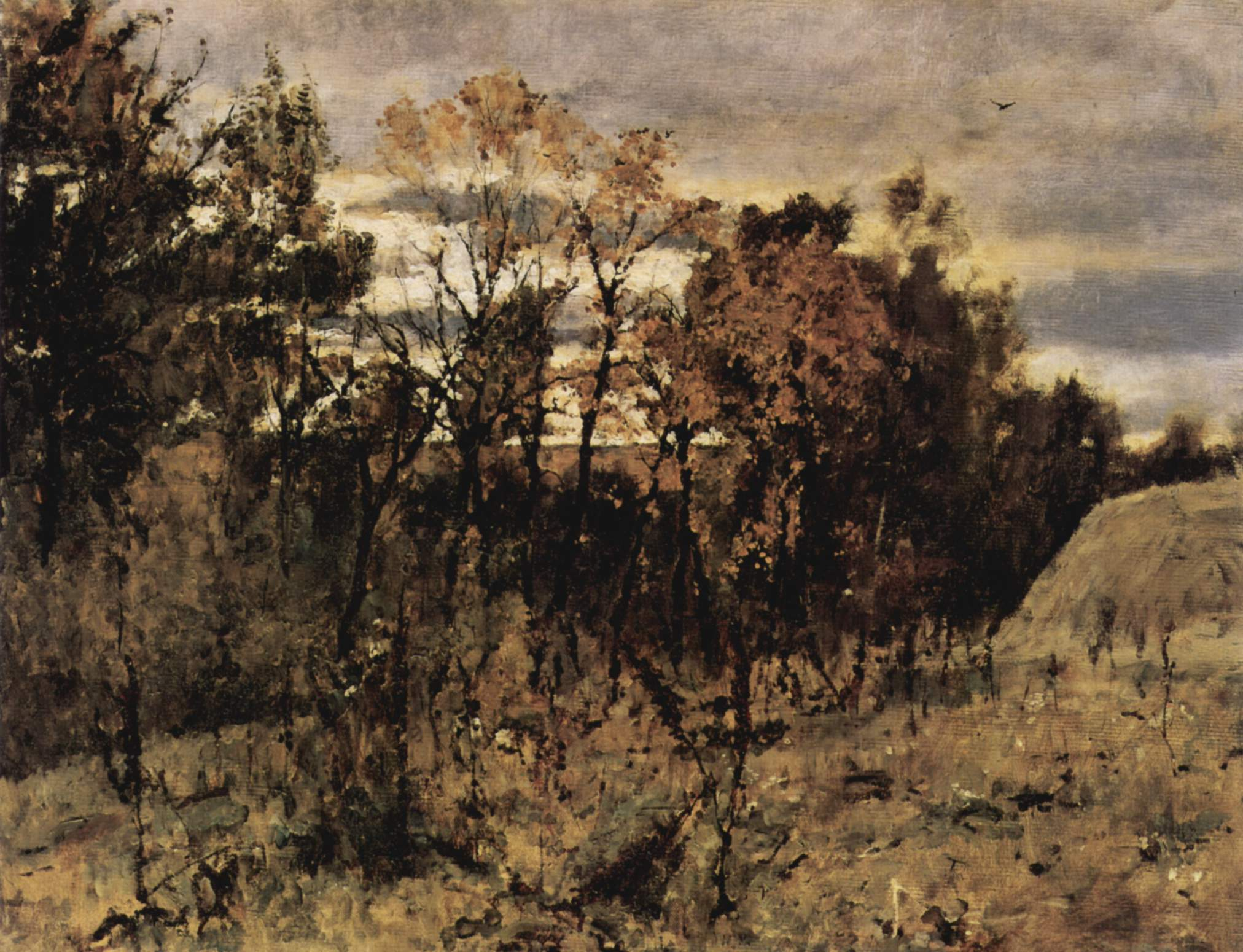
Domotkanovo, by Valentin Serov, currently in the Tretyakov Gallery, Moscow

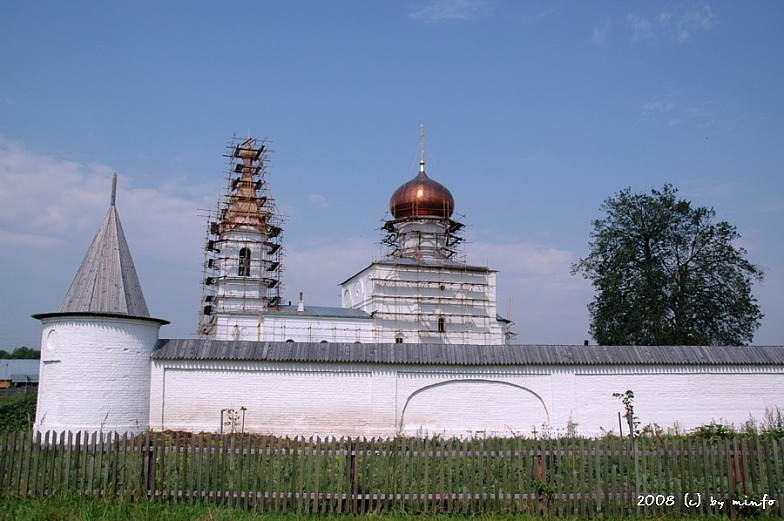
The Orsha Ascension Monastery.

The district contains 12 cultural heritage monuments of federal significance and additionally 140 objects classified as cultural and historical heritage of local significance. The federal monuments include the ensemble of the Orsha Ascension Monastery in the village of Orsha and the ensemble of churches in the selo of Ivanovskoye, as well as the Church of Our Lady of Kazan (1764) in the selo of Mednoye, several archeological sites, and a monument commemorating Polish officers who were executed in Mednoye in 1940.

There are a number of museums in the district. In Domotkanovo, in the former estate of the Derviz family, Valentin Serov, a Russian painter, stayed for extended periods, and the estate is currently a museum. In the settlement of Emmaus, the house of Soviet socialist realist artist Vladimir Serov (unrelated to Valentin Serov) is preserved as a museum. In Emmaus, there is also a museum of Kalinin Front. In Mednoye, there is a complex commemorating Polish prisoners of war who were held in the concentration cam there and executed in 1940. In the village of Knyazevo, the building of a school which the future opera tenor Sergei Lemeshev attended, is also converted into a museum. In the village of Novinki, during the Revolution of 1905, the first Soviet of Peasant Deputies in Russia was formed. The building survived and is currently a museum.
