= Ozyora, Tver Oblast =

Rural locality in Udomelsky District, Tver Oblast, Russia

Coordinates: 58°02′N 34°34′E

Ozyora (Russian: Озёра) is a village in Udomelsky District of Tver Oblast, Russia.
