= Vilovo, Russia =

Rural locality in Rameshkovsky District, Tver Oblast, Russia

Coordinates: 57°22′N 36°19′E

Vilovo (Russian: Вилово) is a rural locality (a village) in Rameshkovsky District of Tver Oblast, Russia. Municipally, it is a part of Aleshino Rural Settlement of Rameshkovsky Municipal District.
