= Buzykovo =

Rural locality in Kashinsky District, Tver Oblast, Russia

Coordinates: 57°27′19″N 37°33′12″E

Buzykovo (Russian: Бузы́ково) is a village in Kashinsky District of Tver Oblast, Russia. It is located close to the town of Kashin and the village of Yurino.

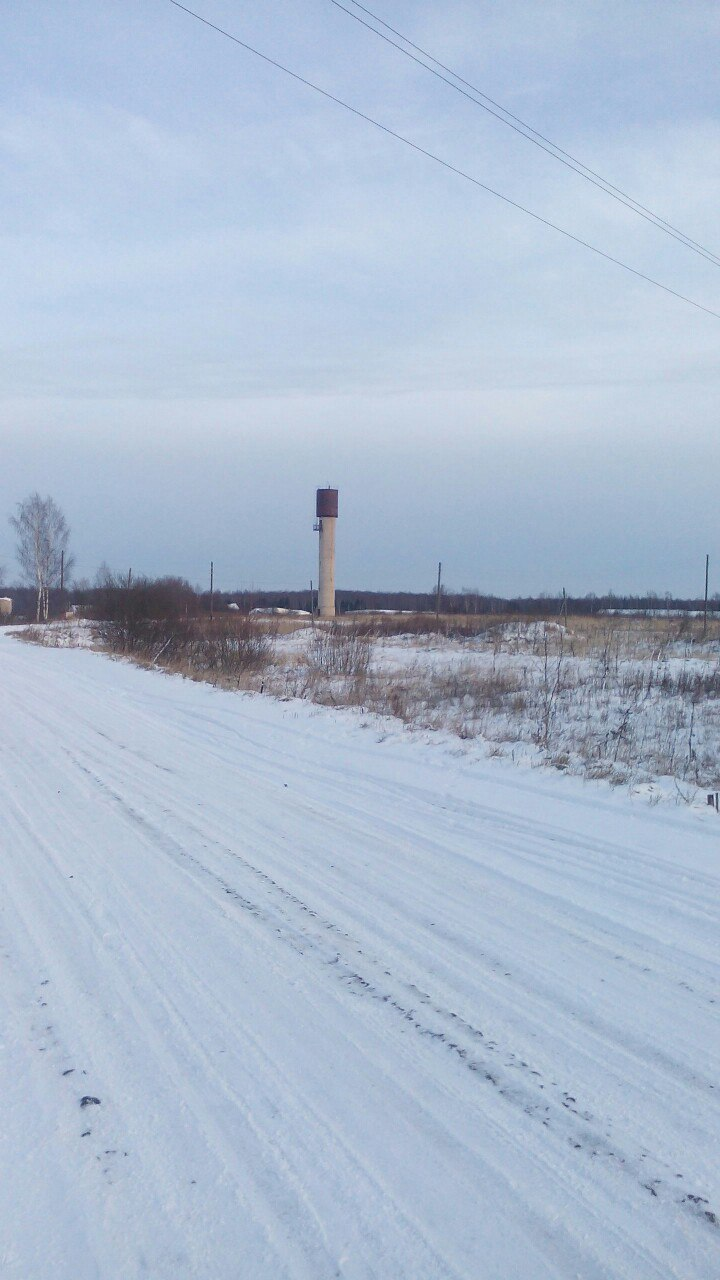
Buzykovo

== Sources ==
- Кашинан кӀоштан индексаш (in Russian)
- Климат Тверской области (in Russian)
- 2002 2010 шш. лараран микрохаамаш (in Russian)
