= Kulovo, Tver Oblast =

Rural locality in Bezhetsky District, Tver Oblast, Russia

Kulovo (Russian: Кулово) is a village in Bezhetsky District of Tver Oblast, Russia.
