= Mashino, Tver Oblast =

Rural locality in Krasnokholmsky District, Tver Oblast, Russia

Coordinates: 57°57′30″N 37°01′36″E

Mashino (Russian: Машино) is a village in Krasnokholmsky District of Tver Oblast, Russia.
