= Abakanovo, Tver Oblast =

Abakanovo Абаканово
- Village
- Location within Tver Oblast Location within Russia
- Coordinates: 56°46′N 32°04′E
- Country: Russia
- Region: Tver Oblast
- District: Andreapolsky District
- Time zone: UTC+3:00

Abakanovo (Russian: Абака́ново) is a rural locality (a village) in Toropatskoye Rural Settlement of Andreapolsky District, Russia. The population was 1 as of 2010.

== Geography ==
Abakanovo is located 23 km northwest of Andreapol (the district's administrative centre) by road. Antanovo is the nearest rural locality.
