= Kostretsy, Tver Oblast =

Rural locality in Maksatikhinsky District, Tver Oblast, Russia

Coordinates: 57°42′N 35°45′E

Kostretsy (Russian: Кострецы́) is a village in Maksatikhinsky District of Tver Oblast, Russia.
