= Administrative divisions of Pskov Oblast =

Administrative districts of Russian federal subject

Pskov Oblast Russia
- Administrative center: Pskov

Administrative structure (as of 2013)
- Districts: 24
- Cities/towns: 14
- Urban-type settlements: 14
- Selsovets: 192

Municipal structure (as of 2002)
- Rural settlements: 8,393 (inhabited); 1,073 (uninhabited)

Administratively, Pskov Oblast is divided into two cities and towns of oblast significance and twenty-four districts.

In terms of the population, the biggest administrative districts are Pskovsky District (34,323 in 2010) and Ostrovsky District (31,096), the smallest one is Usvyatsky District (5,598).

In terms of the area, the biggest administrative district is Bezhanitsky District (3,535 square kilometres (1,365 mi^{2})), the smallest one is Pushkinogorsky District (1,059 square kilometres (409 mi^{2})).

== Administrative and municipal divisions ==
Map

| Division | Structure | | OKATO | OKTMO | Urban-type settlement/ /district-level town* | Rural (volost) |
| Division | Administrative | Municipal | OKATO | OKTMO | Urban-type settlement/ /district-level town* | Rural (volost) |
|---|---|---|---|---|---|---|
| Pskov (Псков) | city | urban okrug | 58 401 | 58 701 | | |
| Velikiye Luki (Великие Луки) | city | urban okrug | 58 410 | 58 710 | | |
| Bezhanitsky (Бежаницкий) | district | | 58 204 | 58 604 | Bezhanitsy (Бежаницы); Krasny Luch (Красный Луч) | 10 |
| Velikoluksky (Великолукский) | district | | 58 206 | 58 606 | | 11 |
| Gdovsky (Гдовский) | district | | 58 208 | 58 608 | Gdov (Гдов) town* | 8 |
| Dedovichsky (Дедовичский) | district | | 58 210 | 58 610 | Dedovichi (Дедовичи) | 11 |
| Dnovsky (Дновский) | district | | 58 212 | 58 612 | Dno (Дно) town* | 5 |
| Krasnogorodsky (Красногородский) | district | | 58 214 | 58 614 | Krasnogorodsk (Красногородск) | 6 |
| Kunyinsky (Куньинский) | district | | 58 216 | 58 616 | Kunya (Кунья) | 8 |
| Loknyansky (Локнянский) | district | | 58 218 | 58 618 | Loknya (Локня) | 6 |
| Nevelsky (Невельский) | district | | 58 220 | 58 620 | Nevel (Невель) town* | 10 |
| Novorzhevsky (Новоржевский) | district | | 58 223 | 58 623 | Novorzhev (Новоржев) town* | 8 |
| Novosokolnichesky (Новосокольнический) | district | | 58 226 | 58 626 | Novosokolniki (Новосокольники) town* | 9 |
| Opochetsky (Опочецкий) | district | | 58 229 | 58 629 | Opochka (Опочка) town* | 8 |
| Ostrovsky (Островский) | district | | 58 233 | 58 633 | Ostrov (Остров) town* | 8 |
| Palkinsky (Палкинский) | district | | 58 237 | 58 637 | Palkino (Палкино) | 6 |
| Pechorsky (Печорский) | district | | 58 240 | 58 640 | Pechory (Печоры) town* | 6 |
| Plyussky (Плюсский) | district | | 58 243 | 58 643 | Plyussa (Плюсса); Zaplyusye (Заплюсье) | 3 |
| Porkhovsky (Порховский) | district | | 58 247 | 58 647 | Porkhov (Порхов) town* | 13 |
| Pskovsky (Псковский) | district | | 58 249 | 58 649 | | 17 |
| Pustoshkinsky (Пустошкинский) | district | | 58 250 | 58 650 | Pustoshka (Пустошка) town* | 5 |
| Pushkinogorsky (Пушкиногорский) | district | | 58 251 | 58 651 | Pushkinskiye Gory (Пушкинские Горы) | 5 |
| Pytalovsky (Пыталовский) | district | | 58 253 | 58 653 | Pytalovo (Пыталово) town* | 9 |
| Sebezhsky (Себежский) | district | | 58 254 | 58 654 | Sebezh (Себеж) town*; Idritsa (Идрица); Sosnovy Bor (Сосновый Бор) | 10 |
| Strugo-Krasnensky (Струго-Красненский) | district | | 58 256 | 58 656 | Strugi Krasnye (Струги Красные) | 6 |
| Usvyatsky (Усвятский) | district | | 58 258 | 58 658 | Usvyaty (Усвяты) | 4 |

== Municipal divisions ==
The municipal divisions of Pskov Oblast are identical with its administrative divisions. All of the administrative districts of Pskov Oblast are municipally incorporated as municipal districts, and the cities of oblast significance are municipally incorporated as urban okrugs.

== History ==
Historically, the whole area of the oblast was dependent on the Novgorod Republic and was annexed by the Grand Duchy of Moscow in the 15th and the 16th centuries. The southern part of the oblast was the battleground area and changed hands frequently, before landing in Poland by the end of the 16th century. December 29 [O.S. December 18], 1708 Tsar Peter the Great issued an edict which established seven governorates. The description of the borders of the governorates was not given; instead, their area was defined as a set of towns and the lands adjacent to those towns. The present area of Pskov oblast was a part of Ingermanland Governorate, which was renamed Saint Petersburg Governorate in 1710. The governorates were subdivided into uyezds, and uyezds into volosts. In 1727, a separate Novgorod Governorate was established. It was subdivided into five provinces, and the current area of Novgorod Oblast was split between two of them - Pskov and Velikiye Luki Provinces. In 1772, after the First Partition of Poland, vast areas which formerly belonged to Poland were annexed by Russia, and in order to accommodate them, Pskov Governorate, with the center in Opochka, was established, and Pskov and Velikiye Luki Provinces, with the exception of Gdovsky Uyezd, were transferred to Pskov Governorate. All current area of Pskov Oblast belonged to Pskov Governorate, with the exception of the areas currently belonging to Gdovsky, Plyussky, and Strugo-Krasnensky Districts. These belonged to Saint Petersburg Governorate. Porkhovsky Uyezd belonged to Novgorod Governorate until 1776, and then it was transferred to Pskov Governorate.

Pskov Governorate has proven to be too big to be administered properly, and in 1776, the decree of the empress, Catherine the Great, was issued. It divided the governorate into Pskov and Polotsk Governorates. Pskov was made the administrative center of Pskov Governorate. In 1777, Pskov Governorate was transformed into Pskov Viceroyalty. In 1796, the viceroyalty was abolished, and the emperor Paul I issued a decree restoring Pskov Governorate.

The south of Pskov Oblast was transferred to Polotsk Governorate, which in 1777 became Polotsk Viceroyalty. In 1796, the viceroyalty was abolished and the area was transferred to Belarus Governorate; since 1802 to Vitebsk Governorate. After 1919, Vitebsk Governorate was a part of Russian Soviet Federative Socialist Republic. In 1924, Vitebsk Governorate was abolished, and Sebezhsky, Nevelsky, and Velizhsky Uyezds were transferred to Pskov Governorate.

In 1920, the Treaty of Tartu established the border between Russia and independent Estonia, and the areas constituting now Pechorsky District, along with the town of Pechory, were transferred to Estonia. In the same year, the Treaty of Riga fixed the boundary between Russia and Latvia, with some parts of Pskov Governorate transferred to Latvia.

On August 1, 1927, Pskov and Saint Petersburg Governorates were abolished, in the course of the administrative reform, and all of the areas which currently belong to Pskov Oblast and belonged then to Soviet Union, became a part of Leningrad Oblast. The oblast was divided into okrugs, and the current area of Pskov Oblast was split between Pskov and Velikiye Luki Okrugs. On June 17, 1929, Velikiye Luki Okrug was transferred to Western Oblast, a huge administrative unit with the center in Smolensk. In 1930, the okrugs were also abolished and the districts were directly subordinated to the oblasts. In 1935, the northern part of Western Oblast was transferred to the newly established Kalinin Oblast. The areas which constitute now Usvyatsky District and the southern part of Kunyinsky District remained in Western Oblast until it was abolished in 1937, at which point they were transferred to Smolensk Oblast.

In the summer of 1941, during the World War II, the current area of Pskov Oblast was occupied by German troops. Most of it was not liberated until the summer of 1944. After the liberation, the administrative division of Soviet Union was considerably changed. On August 22, 1944, Velikiye Luki Oblast was established, with the center in Velikiye Luki, and on the following day, August 23, 1944, Pskov Oblast was established. In 1945, some areas were transferred from Estonian and Latvian Soviet Socialist Republics to Pskov Oblast and formed three districts, Pechorsky, Pytalovsky, and Kachanovsky Districts. Together, Pskov and Velikiye Luki Oblasts now contained all the areas which currently constitute Pskov Oblast. On October 2, 1957, Velikiye Luki Oblast was abolished and split between Pskov and Kalinin Oblasts. As of October 1957, Pskov Oblast also contained Kholmsky and Ploskoshsky Districts, which in July 1958 were transferred to Novgorod and Kalinin Oblasts, respectively.

In the middle of the 1960s the oblast went through the aborted Khrushchyov administrative reform, when districts were first divided into large-scale agricultural and industrial district, and several years later these were abolished, and the oblast got a district structure slightly different from that before the reform.

=== Abolished districts ===
After 1927 (with the exception of the aborted reform of 1963–1966) borders between the districts sometimes were modified, and as a result some of the districts were abolished. This list includes the districts which existed in the current area of Pskov Oblast.

- Ashevsky District (the administrative center in the selo of Chikhachyovo), Kalinin Oblast, established in 1936, since 1944 in Pskov Oblast, abolished in 1963, merged into Bezhanitsky District;
- Chikhachyovsky District (the selo of Chikhachyovo), Leningrad Oblast, established in 1927, abolished in 1932, split between Dedovichsky and Bezhanitsky Districts;
- Idritsky District (the settlement of Idritsa), Leningrad Oblast, established in 1927, since 1929 in Western Oblast, abolished in 1932, split between Sebezhsky and Pustoshkinsky Districts. Re-established in 1936, Kalinin Oblast, since 1944 in Velikiye Luki Oblast, since 1957 in Pskov Oblast, abolished in 1959, merged into Sebezhsky District;
- Kachanovsky District (the selo of Kachanovo), Pskov Oblast, established in 1945, abolished in 1958, split between Pechorsky and Palkinsky Districts;
- Karamyshevsky District (the selo of Karamyshevo), Leningrad Oblast, established in 1927, abolished in 1931, merged into Pskovsky District. Re-established in 1935, Leningrad Oblast, since 1944 in Pskov Oblast, abolished in 1963, split between Pskovsky and Porkhovsky Districts;
- Kudeversky District (the selo of Kudever), Leningrad Oblast, established in 1927, abolished in 1931, merged into Novorzhevsky District. Re-established in 1935, Kalinin Oblast, since 1944 in Velikiye Luki Oblast, since 1957 in Pskov Oblast, abolished in 1958, split between Bezhanitsky, Novorzhevsky, Opochetsky, and Pustoshkinsky Districts;
- Lovatsky District (the selo of Troitsa-Khlavitsa), established in 1927 as Troitsky District, Leningrad Oblast, renamed Lovatsky District in 1930, abolished in 1930, split between Kholmsky and Loknyansky Districts;
- Lyadsky District (the selo of Lyady), established in 1927, Leningrad Oblast, since 1944 in Pskov Oblast, abolished in 1959, split between Plyussky and Gdovsky Districts;
- Nasvinsky District (the settlement of Nasva), established in 1927, Leningrad Oblast, since 1929 in Western Oblast, abolished in 1932, split between Loknyansky, Velikoluksky, and Novosokolnichesky Districts;
- Novoselsky District (the selo of Novoselye), established in 1927, Leningrad Oblast, abolished in 1932, merged into Strugo-Krasnensky District. Re-established in 1935, since 1944 in Pskov Oblast, abolished in 1959, merged into Strugo-Krasnensky District.
- Pavsky District (the selo of Pavy), Pskov Oblast, established in 1946, abolished in 1959, split between Strugo-Krasnensky and Porkhovsky Districts;
- Podberezinsky District (the selo of Podberezye), established in 1945, Velikiye Luki Oblast, since 1957 in Pskov Oblast, abolished in 1958, split between Kholmsky, Loknyansky, Velikoluksky, and Ploskoshsky Districts;
- Polnovsky District (the selo of Polna), established in 1927, Leningrad Oblast, since 1944 in Pskov Oblast, abolished in 1958, merged into Gdovsky District;
- Porechyevsky District (the selo of Porechye), established in 1927, Leningrad Oblast, since 1929 in Western Oblast, abolished in 1930, split between Velikoluksky, Nevelsky, and Usvyatsky Districts. Re-established in 1945as Porechensky District, Velikiye Luki Oblast, since 1957 in Pskov Oblast, abolished in 1959, merged into Velikoluksky District.
- Pozherevitsky District (the village of Pozherevitsy), established in 1939, Leningrad Oblast, since 1944 in Pskov Oblast, abolished in 1958, split between Dedovichsky and Ashevsky Districts;
- Rudnensky District (the selo of Rudno, since 1930 in the village of Vyskatka), established in 1927, Leningrad Oblast, abolished in 1933, split between Gdovsky and Osminsky Districts;
- Rykovsky District (the selo of Skokovo), established in 1927, Leningrad Oblast, since 1929 in Western Oblast, abolished in 1930, split between Nasvinsky, Loknyansky, Novosokolnichesky, and Pustoshkinsky Districts;
- Seryodkinsky District (the selo of Seryodka), established in 1927, Leningrad Oblast, since 1944 in Pskov Oblast, abolished in 1958, split between Gdovsky and Pskovsky Districts;
- Slavkovsky District (the selo of Slavkovichi), established in 1927, Leningrad Oblast, since 1944 in Pskov Oblast, abolished in 1959, merged into Karamyshevsky District;
- Soshikhinsky District (the selo of Vorontsovo), established in 1935, Leningrad Oblast, since 1944 in Pskov Oblast, abolished in 1959, split between Ostrovsky and Novorzhevsky Districts;
- Usmynsky District (the selo of Usmyn), established in 1927, Leningrad Oblast, since 1929 in Western Oblast Oblast, abolished in 1930, split between Velizhsky and Usvyatsky Districts. Re-established in 1945 as Prikhabsky District, Velikiye Luki Oblast, with the administrative center in the selo of Prikhaby. In 1949, renamed Usmynsky, the administrative center moved to Usmyn, since 1957 in Pskov Oblast. Abolished in 1957, merged into Kunyinsky District;
- Ust-Dolyssky District (the selo of Ust-Dolyssy), established in 1928, Leningrad Oblast, since 1929 in Western Oblast Oblast, abolished in 1930, split between Nevelsky and Pustoshkinsky Districts. Re-established in 1952, Velikiye Luki Oblast, with the administrative center in the selo of Prikhaby. In 1949, renamed Usmynsky, the administrative center moved to Usmyn, since 1957 in Pskov Oblast. Abolished in 1959, split between Nevelsky and Pustoshkinsky Districts;
- Vyborsky District (the village of Vybor), established in 1927, Leningrad Oblast, abolished in 1932, split between Slavkovsky and Novorzhevsky Districts.

The area of Lovatsky District is currently split between Pskov and Novgorod Oblasts. The area of Podberezinsky Districts is split between Pskov, Tver, and Novgorod Oblasts. The area of Rudnensky District is split between Pskov and Leningrad Oblasts.

=== Renamed districts ===
In 1937, Pushkinsky District was renamed Pushkinogorsky District.
