= Bezhanitsky District =

Bezhanitsky District Бежаницкий район (Russian)
- District
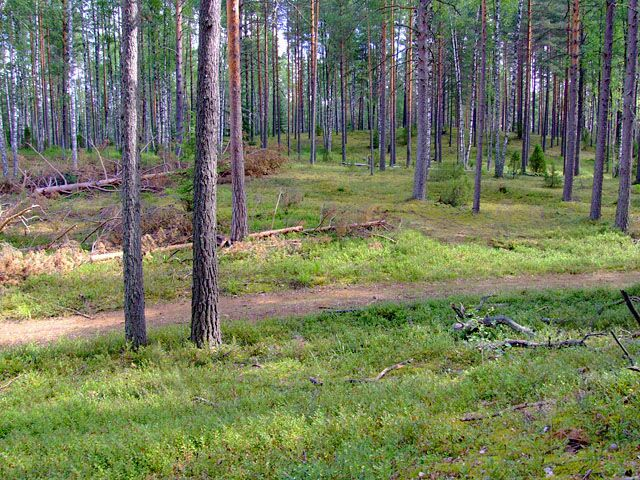
- Bezhanitskaya Upland in Bezhanitsky District

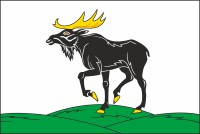
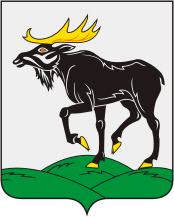
- Flag Coat of arms
- Location of Bezhanitsky District in Pskov Oblast
- Coordinates: 56°58′N 29°53′E
- Country: Russia
- Federal subject: Pskov Oblast
- Established: 1927
- Administrative center: Bezhanitsy

Area
  - Total: 3,535 km^{2} (1,365 sq mi)

Population (2010 Census)
  - Total: 13,264
  - Density: 3.752/km^{2} (9.718/sq mi)
  - Urban: 40.4%
  - Rural: 59.6%

Administrative structure
  - Inhabited localities: 2 urban-type settlements, 466 rural localities

Municipal structure
  - Municipally incorporated as: Bezhanitsky Municipal District
  - Municipal divisions: 1 urban settlements, 8 rural settlements
- Time zone: UTC+3 (MSK)
- OKTMO ID: 58604000
- Website: http://bezhanicy.reg60.ru/

Bezhanitsky District (Russian: Бежа́ницкий райо́н) is an administrative and municipal district (raion), one of the twenty-four in Pskov Oblast, Russia. It is located in the central and eastern parts of the oblast and borders with Dedovichsky District in the north, Poddorsky and Kholmsky Districts of Novgorod Oblast in the east, Loknyansky District in the south, Novosokolnichesky, Pustoshkinsky, and Opochetsky Districts in the southwest, and with Novorzhevsky District in the west. The area of the district is 3,535 square kilometers (1,365 sq mi). Its administrative center is the urban locality (a work settlement) of Bezhanitsy. Population: 13,264 (2010 census); 17,547 (2002 Census); 22,784 (1989 Soviet census). The population of Bezhanitsy accounts for 32.7% of the district's total population.

== Geography ==
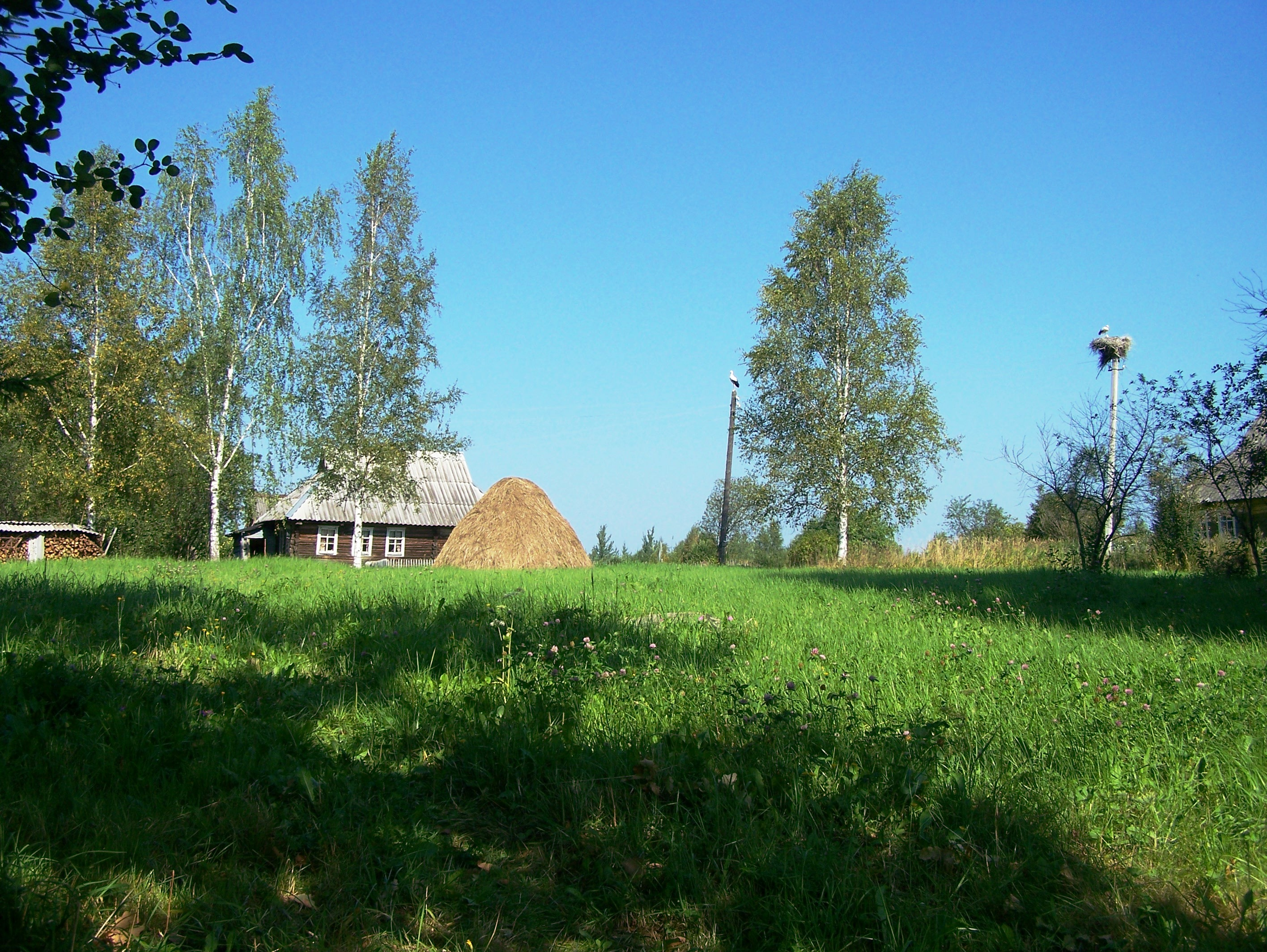
The village of Feshkovo

The district is elongated from southeast to northwest. The divide between the basins of the Narva and Neva Rivers crosses the district from south to north. The northwestern part of the district lies the basin of the Polist River, with both the Polist and its major right tributary, the Porusya, having their sources within the district. The Polist flows into the Lovat River and thus belongs to the basin of the Neva. The Loknya, a left tributary of the Lovat, makes up a stretch of the border with Loknyansky District. Some areas in the south of the district are in the basin of the Loknya. The western part of the district belongs to the basin of the Velikaya River. The rivers in the northwest of the district drain into the Sorot, a major right tributary of the Velikaya, and into the Lsta, a left tributary of the Sorot. The southwest of the district belongs to the basin of the Alolya River, another right tributary of the Velikaya.

There are many lakes in the district, with the largest ones being Lakes Polisto, Alyo, Tsevlo, Kamennoye, and Dubets. 27.6% of the district's territory is covered by forests, predominantly deciduous. Further 44% is occupied by agricultural lands.

The Polistovsky Nature Reserve, located mostly in the drainage basin of the Polist in the northwest of the district, is one of the first wetland preserves in Russia, founded in 1994. It was created to protect the raised bog landscapes of the Polist-Lovat Swamp System.

== History ==
In the course of the administrative reform carried out in 1708 by Peter the Great, the area was included into Ingermanland Governorate (known since 1710 as Saint Petersburg Governorate). In 1727, separate Novgorod Governorate was split off, and in 1772, Pskov Governorate (which between 1777 and 1796 existed as Pskov Viceroyalty) was established. The area was a part of Pustorzhevsky Uyezd, which in 1777 was renamed Novorzhevsky Uyezd of Pskov Viceroyalty. In 1796, when the viceroyalty was abolished, the uyezd was abolished as well; however, it was re-established in 1802. In the mid-18th century, Bezhanitsy, which was located on the road connecting Porkhov and Velikiye Luki, quickly developed as a center of yam (state-sponsored transportation).

On August 1, 1927, the uyezds were abolished, and Bezhanitsky District was established, with the administrative center in the selo of Bezhanitsy. It included parts of former Novorzhevsky Uyezd. The governorates were abolished as well, and the district became a part of Pskov Okrug of Leningrad Oblast. On July 23, 1930, the okrugs were also abolished, and the districts were directly subordinated to the oblast. On January 29, 1935, the district was transferred to Kalinin Oblast, and on February 5 of the same year, Bezhanitsky District became a part of Velikiye Luki Okrug of Kalinin Oblast, one of the okrugs abutting the state boundaries of the Soviet Union. On May 11, 1937, the district was transferred to Opochka Okrug. On May 4, 1938, the district was directly subordinated to Kalinin Oblast. Between 1941 and 1944, Bezhanitsky District was occupied by German troops. On August 22, 1944, the district was transferred to newly established Velikiye Luki Oblast. On October 2, 1957, Velikiye Luki Oblast was abolished, and the district was transferred to Pskov Oblast.

On August 28, 1958, Krasny Luch was granted work settlement status, and on August 7, 1961, Bezhanitsy followed.

On August 1, 1927, Chikhachyovsky District was established as well, with the administrative center in the selo of Chikhachyovo. It included parts of former Novorzhevsky and Porkhovsky Uyezds. The district was a part of Pskov Okrug of Leningrad Oblast. On January 1, 1932, the district was abolished and split between Dedovichsky and Bezhanitsky Districts.

Another district established on August 1, 1927 was Kudeversky District with the administrative center in the selo of Kudever. It included parts of former Novorzhevsky Uyezd. The district was a part of Pskov Okrug of Leningrad Oblast. On September 20, 1931, Kudeversky District was abolished and merged into Novorzhevsky District. On March 5, 1935, it was re-established as a part of Velikiye Luki Okrug of Kalinin Oblast; on May 11, 1937, the district was transferred to Opochka Okrug. On August 22, 1944, the district was transferred to Velikiye Luki Oblast. On October 2, 1957, Velikiye Luki Oblast was abolished, and Kudeversky District was transferred to Pskov Oblast. On January 14, 1958, Kudeversky District was abolished and split between Bezhanitsky, Novorzhevsky, Opochetsky, and Pustoshkinsky Districts.

On June 1, 1936, Ashevsky District with the administrative center in the selo of Chikhachyovo was established. It included parts of Bezhanitsky and Loknyansky Districts. The district was a part of Velikiye Luki Okrug of Kalinin Oblast. On May 11, 1937, the district was transferred to Opochka Okrug. On May 4, 1938, the district was directly subordinated to Kalinin Oblast. Between 1941 and 1944, Ashevsky District was occupied by German troops. On August 23, 1944, it was included into newly established Pskov Oblast. On February 1, 1963, the district was abolished and merged into Bezhanitsky District.

== Economy ==
=== Industry ===
The largest industrial enterprise of the district is Krasny Luch Glass-Works, which is one of the oldest glass-works. The works produces light glass, consumer goods, and decorative glass items. It is located in the urban-type settlement of Krasny Luch.

=== Agriculture ===
Agriculture forms the basis of the district's economy and employs over 22% of the population. The main product is dairy, with growing and processing of flax also being important.

=== Transportation ===
The railway connecting St. Petersburg and Vitebsk crosses the district from north to south.

Bezhanitsy is connected by road with Porkhov, Velikiye Luki (via Loknya), and Novorzhev. There are also local roads with bus traffic originating from Bezhanitsy.

== Culture and recreation ==
The district contains four cultural heritage monuments of federal significance and additionally twenty-two objects classified as cultural and historical heritage of local significance. The federally protected monuments are two churches and two archeological sites.

The major places of interest in the district are:

- Philosophovs Historical and Cultural Center, placed in the noble family estate of the Philosophovs (late 19th century)
- St. Nicholas Church, 1822, in the village of Dvortsy
- Church of the Tikhvin Mother of God, 1799–1807, in the village of Dobryvichi;
- an ancient settlement site, first half of the 2d millennium AD, the village of Gorodok, northeast of Lake Tsevlo
- an ancient settlement site, 10-15th centuries, southeast of the village of Podorzhevka
