= Borovichi (inhabited locality) =

Borovichi (Russian: Боровичи) is the name of several inhabited localities in Russia.

Urban localities

- Borovichi, a town of oblast significance in Novgorod Oblast

Rural localities

- Borovichi, Kurgan Oblast, a selo in Bakharevsky Selsoviet of Safakulevsky District of Kurgan Oblast
- Borovichi, Bezhanitsky District, Pskov Oblast, a village in Bezhanitsky District, Pskov Oblast
- Borovichi, Bezhanitsky District, Pskov Oblast, a village in Bezhanitsky District, Pskov Oblast
- Borovichi, Novorzhevsky District, Pskov Oblast, a village in Novorzhevsky District, Pskov Oblast
- Borovichi (Tugotinskaya Rural Settlement), Porkhovsky District, Pskov Oblast, a village in Porkhovsky District, Pskov Oblast; municipally, a part of Tugotinskaya Rural Settlement of that district
- Borovichi (Dubrovenskaya Rural Settlement), Porkhovsky District, Pskov Oblast, a village in Porkhovsky District, Pskov Oblast; municipally, a part of Dubrovenskaya Rural Settlement of that district
