= Dnovsky District =

Dnovsky District Дновский район (Russian)
- District
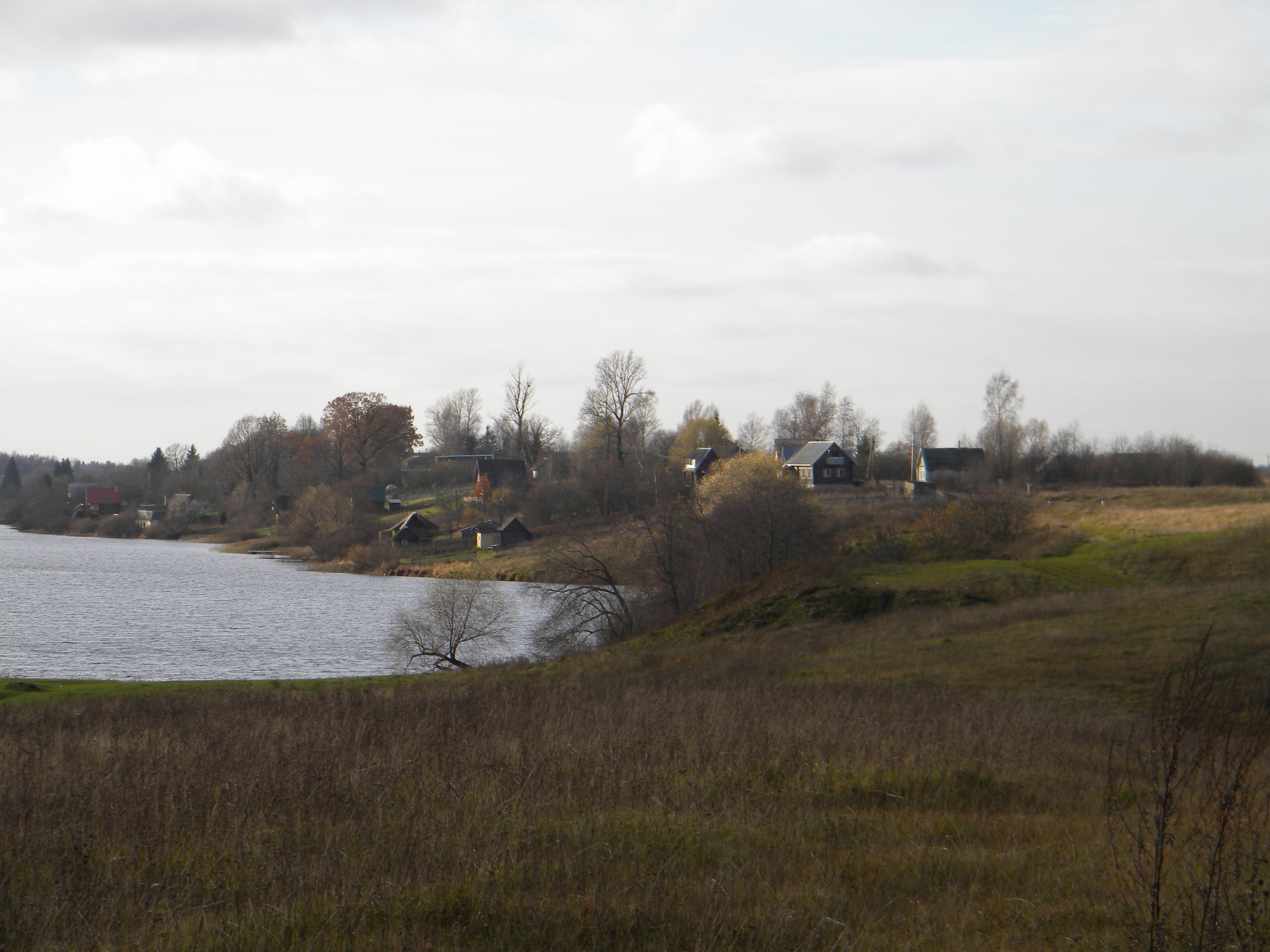

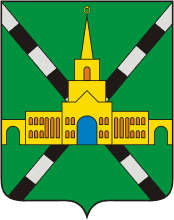
- Flag Coat of arms
- Location of Dnovsky District in Pskov Oblast
- Coordinates: 57°49′N 29°58′E
- Country: Russia
- Federal subject: Pskov Oblast
- Established: 1 August 1927
- Administrative center: Dno

Area
  - Total: 1,194 km^{2} (461 sq mi)

Population (2010 Census)
  - Total: 13,341
  - Density: 11.17/km^{2} (28.94/sq mi)
  - Urban: 67.9%
  - Rural: 32.1%

Administrative structure
  - Inhabited localities: 1 cities/towns, 146 rural localities

Municipal structure
  - Municipally incorporated as: Dnovsky Municipal District
  - Municipal divisions: 1 urban settlements, 5 rural settlements
- Time zone: UTC+3 (MSK)
- OKTMO ID: 58612000
- Website: http://dno.reg60.ru/

Dnovsky District (Russian: Дно́вский райо́н) is an administrative and municipal district (raion), one of the twenty-four in Pskov Oblast, Russia. It is located in the east of the oblast and borders with Soletsky District of Novgorod Oblast in the northeast, Volotovsky District, also of Novgorod Oblast, in the east, Dedovichsky District in the south, and with Porkhovsky District in the west. The area of the district is 1,194 square kilometers (461 sq mi). Its administrative center is the town of Dno. Population: 13,341 (2010 census); 16,048 (2002 Census); 20,110 (1989 Soviet census). The population of Dno accounts for 67.9% of the district's total population.

== Geography ==
Being a part of the Ilmen Depression, the district's landscape is essentially flat. The district lies in the basin of the Shelon River. The biggest rivers in the district, all of them being right tributaries of the Shelon, are the Dubyanka, the Polonka, and the Lyuta. A part of the Shelon itself flows through the district as well.

== History ==
In the past, the area belonged to the Novgorod Republic. Two villages with the name of Dno (Bolshoye Dno and Maloye Dno) were first mentioned in chronicles in the 15th century. After the fall of the Novgorod Republic in 1478, the area was, together will the rest of Novgorod lands, annexed by the Grand Duchy of Moscow. It belonged to Shelonskaya Pyatina, one of the five pyatinas into which Novgorod lands were divided. In the 16th century, state-sponsored roads were built, and the area became one of the centers of yam, the road messenger system. In the course of the administrative reform carried out in 1708 by Peter the Great, the area was included into Ingermanland Governorate (known since 1710 as Saint Petersburg Governorate). In 1727, separate Novgorod Governorate was split off, and in 1772, Pskov Governorate (which between 1777 and 1796 existed as Pskov Viceroyalty) was established. In 1776, Porkhovsky Uyezd was transferred from Novgorod Governorate to Pskov Governorate. The area was a part of Porkhovsky Uyezd, and Dno was the seat of Dnovskaya Volost.

On August 1, 1927, the uyezds were abolished, and Dnovsky District was established, with the administrative center in the town of Dno. It included parts of former Porkhovsky Uyezd. The governorates were abolished as well, and the district became a part of Pskov Okrug of Leningrad Oblast. On July 23, 1930, the okrugs were also abolished, and the districts were directly subordinated to the oblast. Between August 1941 and February 1944, Dnovsky District was occupied by German troops. On August 23, 1944, the district was transferred to newly established Pskov Oblast.

== Economy ==
=== Industry ===
The industrial enterprises in the district include two metalworking plants, a ceramic production plant, and a bakery.

=== Agriculture ===
The main agricultural specialization in the district is cattle breeding with meat and milk production. As of 2012, eight large- and mid-scale farms were operating in the district.

=== Transportation ===
Dno is an important railway station where two railways cross. One connects Bologoye and Pskov via Staraya Russa and runs from east to west. Another one connects St. Petersburg and Vitebsk and runs from north to south.

Dno is connected by roads with Soltsy, Porkhov, and Dedovichi. There are also local roads with bus traffic.

== Culture and recreation ==
The district contains three cultural heritage monuments of federal significance and additionally twenty-six objects classified as cultural and historical heritage of local significance. The federally protected monuments are archeological sites.
