= Listvenka =

Listvenka (Russian: Лиственка) is the name of several rural localities in Russia:

- Listvenka, Leningrad Oblast, a village in Zaboryevskoye Settlement Municipal Formation of Boksitogorsky District of Leningrad Oblast
- Listvenka, Opochetsky District, Pskov Oblast, a village in Opochetsky District of Pskov Oblast
- Listvenka, Pskovsky District, Pskov Oblast, a village in Pskovsky District of Pskov Oblast
- Listvenka, Vologda Oblast, a village in Roslyatinsky Selsoviet of Babushkinsky District of Vologda Oblast
