= Sorot =

Sorot Russian: Сороть
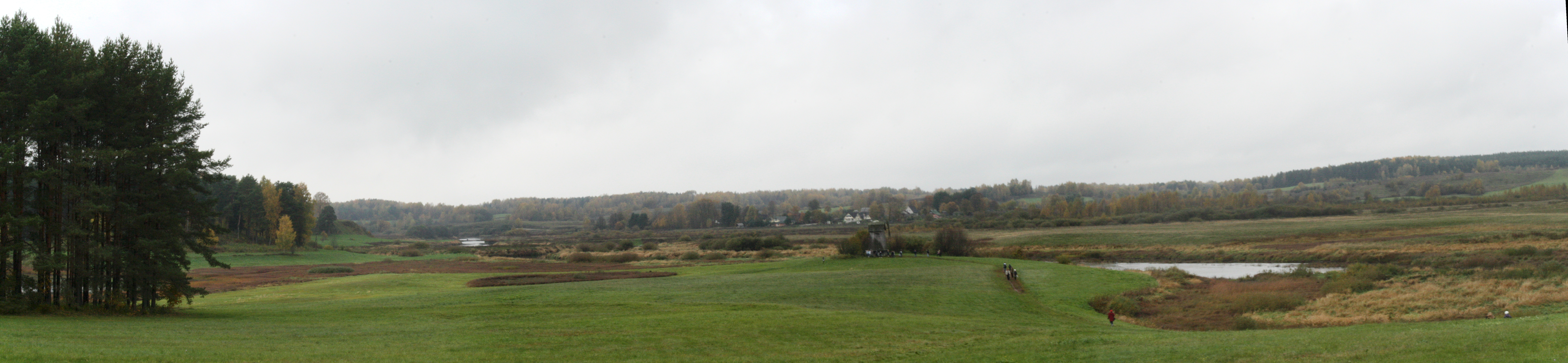
- The Sorot seen from the former village of Mikhaylovskoye

Location
- Country: Russia

Physical characteristics
- Source
  - location: Lake Mikhalkinskoye
- Mouth: Velikaya
  - coordinates: 57°03′57″N 28°48′57″E
- Length: 80 km (50 mi)
- Basin size: 3,910 km^{2} (1,510 sq mi)

Basin features
- Progression: Velikaya→ Lake Peipus→ Narva→ Gulf of Finland

The Sorot (Russian: Сороть) is a river in Novorzhevsky, Bezhanitsky, and Pushkinogorsky Districts of Pskov Oblast in Russia. It is a right tributary of the Velikaya. It is 80 kilometres (50 mi) long, and the area of its basin 3,910 square kilometres (1,510 sq mi). The main tributary of the Sorot is the Lsta (left).

The source of the Sorot is Lake Mikhalkinskoye in the eastern part of Novorzhevsky District. The river flows to the east, reaches the boundary between Novorzhevsky and Bezhanitsky Districts and turns north such that a stretch of it forms the boundary. Further north, it turns west, accepts the Lsta from the left, crosses Novorzhevsky and Pushkinogorsky Districts, and joins the Velikaya downstream of the village of Selikhnovo. In the lower course, the Sorot flows through the Mikhaylovskoye Museum Reserve. The town of Novorzhev is located on the banks of the Sorot.

The Sorot flows through a number of lakes, the biggest of which are Lake Beloguli and Lake Posadnikovskoye.

The drainage basin of the Sorot is large and includes Novorzhevsky District, the northeastern part of Pushkinogorsky District, the western part of Bezhanitsky District, as well as minor areas in Dedovichsky and Porkhovsky Districts.
