= Posadnikovo =

Posadnikovo (Russian: Посадниково) is the name of several rural localities (settlements and villages) in Russia:

- Posadnikovo, Leningrad Oblast^{[ru]}, a settlement of the crossing in Kusinskoye Settlement Municipal Formation of Kirishsky District of Leningrad Oblast
- Posadnikovo, Novorzhevsky District, Pskov Oblast^{[ru]}, a village in Novorzhevsky District, Pskov Oblast
- Posadnikovo, Opochetsky District, Pskov Oblast^{[ru]}, a village in Opochetsky District, Pskov Oblast
- Posadnikovo, Vologda Oblast^{[ru]}, a village in Rostilovsky Selsoviet of Gryazovetsky District of Vologda Oblast
