= Porkhovsky =

Porkhovsky (masculine), Porkhovskaya (feminine), or Porkhovskoye (neuter) may refer to:

- Porkhovsky District, a district of Pskov Oblast, Russia
- Porkhovsky (family), a princely family of Rurikid stock
- Porkhovskoye, a rural locality (a settlement) in Kaliningrad Oblast, Russia
