= Krasny Luch, Pskov Oblast =

Krasny Luch Красный Луч
- Work settlement
- Interactive map of Krasny Luch
- Location of Krasny Luch Krasny Luch (Pskov Oblast)
- Coordinates: 57°04′06″N 30°05′43″E
- Country: Russia
- Federal subject: Pskov Oblast
- Administrative district: Bezhanitsky District
- First mentioned: 1905
- Urban-type settlement status since: 1958

Population (2010 Census)
  - Total: 1,020
  - Estimate (2021): 724 (−29%)

Municipal status
  - Municipal district: Bezhanitsky Municipal District
  - Rural settlement: Polistovskoye Rural Settlement
  - Capital of: Polistovskoye Rural Settlement
- Time zone: UTC+3 (MSK)
- Postal code: 182847
- OKTMO ID: 58604472051

Krasny Luch (Russian: Кра́сный Луч) is an urban locality (a work settlement) in Bezhanitsky District of Pskov Oblast, Russia. Municipally, it is a part of Polistovskoye Rural Settlement. Population: 1,020 (2010 census); 1,494 (2002 census); 2,105 (1989 Soviet census).

== History ==
The former Lezavichi estate was bought by Gurevich, an entrepreneur from Vitebsk, in 1902. Gurevich first built there a sawmill, and eventually the glass-making factory, which was opened in 1904. After the revolution, the factory was renamed The Krasny Luch Glass-Works, and the settlement around the factory, founded in 1905, became known as Krasny Luch. At the time, Krasny Luch was located in Novorzhevsky Uyezd of Pskov Governorate. On August 1, 1927, the uyezds were abolished, Krasny Luch became a part of Bezhanitsky District, which belonged to Pskov Okrug of Leningrad Oblast. On July 23, 1930, the okrugs were also abolished, and the districts were directly subordinated to the oblast. On January 29, 1935 the district was transferred to Kalinin Oblast, and on February 5 Bezhanitsky District became a part of Velikiye Luki Okrug of Kalinin Oblast, one of the okrugs abutting the state boundaries of the Soviet Union. On May 11, 1937 the district was transferred to Opochka Okrug. On May 4, 1938 the district was directly subordinated to Kalinin Oblast.

During World War II the factory was badly damaged, but after the war it was restored. On August 22, 1944, Bezhanitsky District was transferred to newly established Velikiye Luki Oblast. On October 2, 1957 Velikiye Luki Oblast was abolished, and the district was transferred to Pskov Oblast. On August 28, 1958 Krasny Luch was granted urban-type settlement status.

== Economy ==
=== Industry ===
The largest industrial enterprise of Bezhanitsky District is Krasny Luch Glass-Works, which is one of the oldest glass-works. The works produces light glass, consumer goods, and decorative glass items.

=== Transportation ===
Krasny Luch is connected by a paved road with Tsevlo and Bezhanitsy. The closest railway station, Sushchyovo, on the railway connecting St. Petersburg and Vitebsk, is located about a dozen kilometers west of Krasny Luch.
