= Alolya =

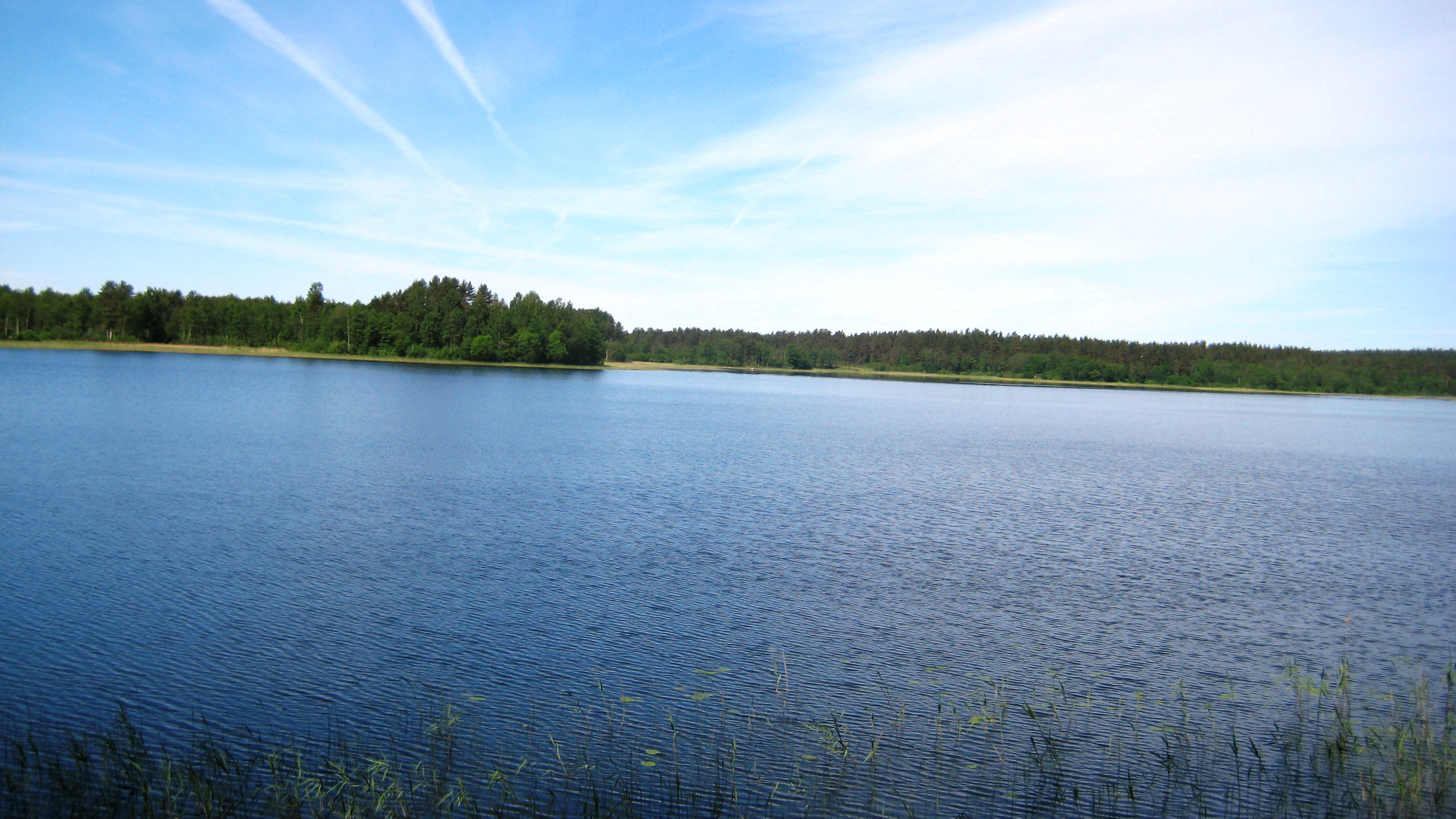
- Native name: Алоля (Russian)

Location
- Country: Russia

Physical characteristics
- Source: Lake Arno
- Mouth: Velikaya
  - coordinates: 56.4365°N 29.0893°E
- Length: 105 km (65 mi)
- Basin size: 860 km^{2} (330 sq mi)

Basin features
- Progression: Velikaya→ Lake Peipus→ Narva→ Gulf of Finland

The Alolya (Russian: Алоля, the Alol, Russian: Алоль) is a river in Opochetsky, Novorzhevsky, Bezhanitsky, and Pustoshkinsky Districts of Pskov Oblast in Russia. It is a right tributary of the Velikaya. It is 105 kilometres (65 mi) long, and the area of its basin 860 square kilometres (330 sq mi).

The source of the Alolya is Lake Arno on the Bezhanitsy Hills in Opochetsky District. It flows east, forming the border between Opochetsky and Novrozhevsky Districts, then downstream forms the border between Opochetsky and Bezhanitsky Districts and departs east from the border. The Alolya flows through Lake Kudeverskoye and turns southwest, where it again forms the border between Opochetsky and Bezhanitsky Districts, and downstream - between Opochetsky and Pustoshkinsky Districts. It accepts the Tsipilyanka from the left and departs from the border south into Pustoshkinsky District. The mouth of the Alolya is close to the village of Verbilovo.

The drainage basin of the Alolya includes many lakes, the biggest of which is Lake Kamennoye.
