= Novorzhevsky District =

Novorzhevsky District Новоржевский район (Russian)
- District
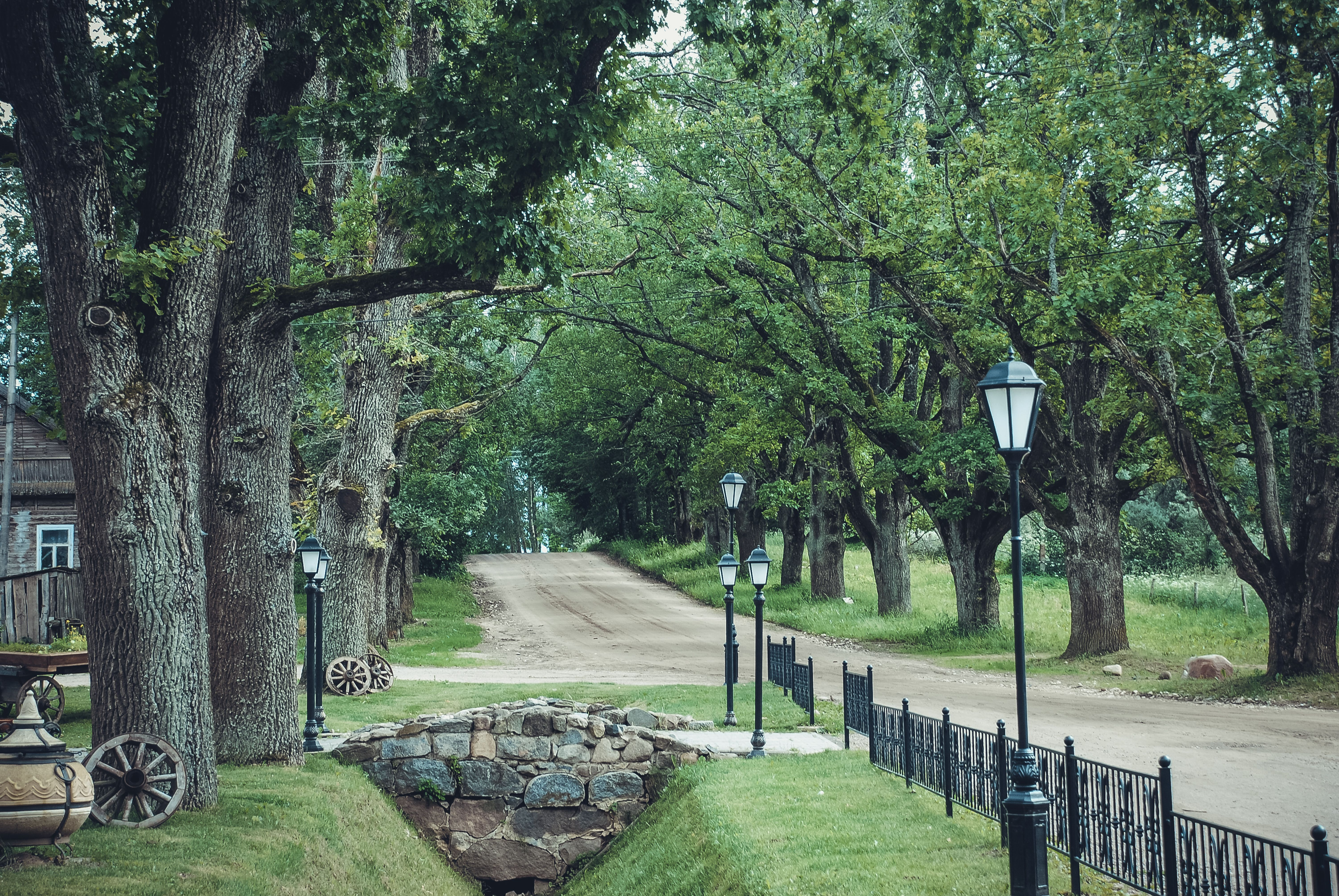
- Park in Altun, Novorzhevsky District

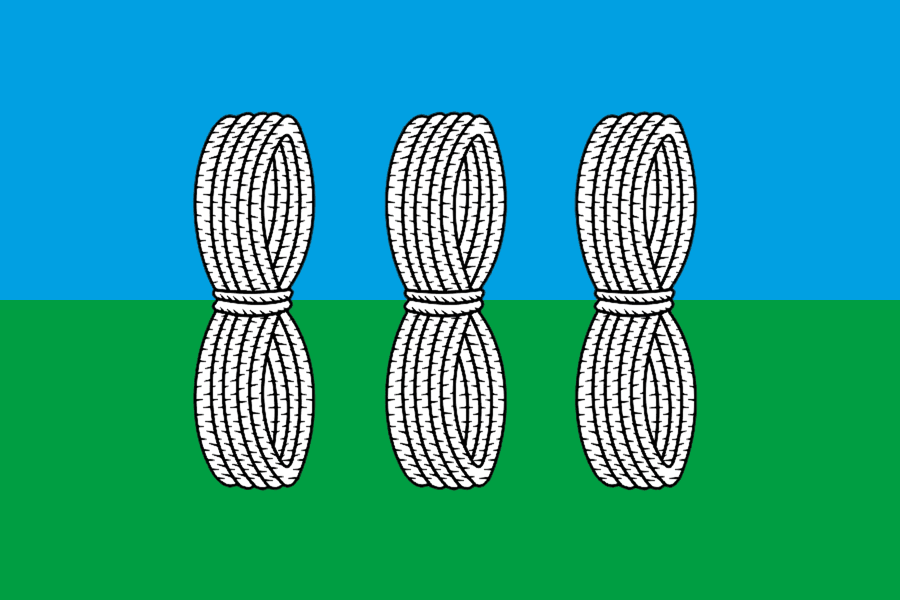
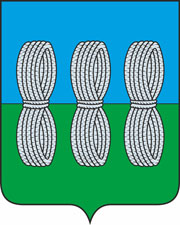
- Flag Coat of arms
- Location of Novorzhevsky District in Pskov Oblast
- Coordinates: 57°02′N 29°20′E
- Country: Russia
- Federal subject: Pskov Oblast
- Established: 1 August 1927
- Administrative center: Novorzhev

Area
  - Total: 1,683 km^{2} (650 sq mi)

Population (2010 Census)
  - Total: 9,334
  - Density: 5.546/km^{2} (14.36/sq mi)
  - Urban: 39.6%
  - Rural: 60.4%

Administrative structure
  - Inhabited localities: 1 cities/towns, 437 rural localities

Municipal structure
  - Municipally incorporated as: Novorzhevsky Municipal District
  - Municipal divisions: 1 urban settlements, 8 rural settlements
- Time zone: UTC+3 (MSK)
- OKTMO ID: 58623000
- Website: http://novorzhev.reg60.ru/

Novorzhevsky District (Russian: Новорже́вский райо́н) is an administrative and municipal district (raion), one of the twenty-four in Pskov Oblast, Russia. It is located in the center of the oblast and borders with Porkhovsky District in the north, Dedovichsky District in the northeast, Bezhanitsky District in the east, Opochetsky District in the south, Pushkinogorsky District in the west, and with Ostrovsky District in the northwest. The area of the district is 1,683 square kilometers (650 sq mi). Its administrative center is the town of Novorzhev. Population: 9,334 (2010 census); 12,217 (2002 Census); 15,477 (1989 Soviet census). The population of Novorzhev accounts for 39.6% of the district's total population.

== Geography ==
The district lies in the basin of the Velikaya River and thus of the Narva River. The rivers in the northern and the central parts of the district drain into the Sorot River, a right tributary of the Velikaya, and into its main tributary, the Lsta River. Some areas in the south of the district belong to the basin of the Shest River, and some areas in the northern part belong to the basin of the Cheryokha River; the Shest and the Cheryokha are two other right tributaries of the Velikaya. There are over a hundred lakes in the district.

The north and the south of the district are hilly; the middle part, which includes the valley of the Sorot, is flat, with many lakes and swamps. Mount Stepulikha, with the height of 328 meters (1,076 ft), is located in the south of the district and is the highest point of Pskov Oblast.

== History ==
In the medieval times, the area belonged to the Novgorod Republic and was known as Rzheva Pustaya. In the end of the 15th century, together with Novgorod, it was annexed by the Grand Duchy of Moscow. In the course of the administrative reform carried out in 1708 by Peter the Great, the area was included into Ingermanland Governorate (known since 1710 as Saint Petersburg Governorate). Rzheva Pustaya and Zavolochye are mentioned among towns the governorate consisted of. In 1727, separate Novgorod Governorate was split off, and in 1772, Pskov Governorate (which between 1777 and 1796 existed as Pskov Viceroyalty) was established. In 1777, Novorzhev was founded and became a town and the seat of Novorzhevsky Uyezd of Pskov Viceroyalty. In 1796, when the viceroyalty was abolished, the uyezd was abolished as well; however, it was re-established in 1802.

On August 1, 1927, the uyezds were abolished and Novorzhevsky District was established, with the administrative center in the town of Novorzhev. It included parts of former Novorzhevsky Uyezd. The governorates were abolished as well, and the district became a part of Pskov Okrug of Leningrad Oblast. On July 23, 1930, the okrugs were also abolished, and the districts were directly subordinated to the oblast. On January 29, 1935, the district was transferred to Kalinin Oblast, and on February 5 of the same year, Novorzhevsky District became a part of Velikiye Luki Okrug of Kalinin Oblast, one of the okrugs abutting the state boundaries of the Soviet Union. On May 11, 1937, the district was transferred to Opochka Okrug. On February 5, 1941, the okrug was abolished. Between July 1941 and February 1944, Novorzhevsky District was occupied by German troops. On August 23, 1944, the district was transferred to newly established Pskov Oblast.

On August 1, 1927, Vyborsky District was also established, with the administrative center in the village of Vybor. It included parts of former Ostrovsky Uyezd. The district was a part of Pskov Okrug of Leningrad Oblast. On January 1, 1932, Vyborsky District was abolished and split between Slavkovsky and Novorzhevsky Districts.

Another district established on August 1, 1927 was Kudeversky District with the administrative center in the selo of Kudever. It included parts of former Novorzhevsky Uyezd. The district was a part of Pskov Okrug of Leningrad Oblast. On September 20, 1931, Kudeversky District was abolished and merged into Novorzhevsky District. On March 5, 1935, it was re-established as a part of Velikiye Luki Okrug of Kalinin Oblast; on May 11, 1937, it was transferred to Opochka Okrug. On August 22, 1944, the district was transferred to newly established Velikiye Luki Oblast. On October 2, 1957, Velikiye Luki Oblast was abolished and Kudeversky District was transferred to Pskov Oblast. On January 14, 1958, Kudeversky District was abolished and split between Bezhanitsky, Novorzhevsky, Opochetsky, and Pustoshkinsky Districts.

== Economy ==
=== Industry ===
There is a factory producing electric equipment and a textile factory in Novorzhev.

=== Agriculture ===
The main specializations of the agriculture in the district are cattle breeding with meat and milk production, and crops and flax growing.

=== Transportation ===
Novorzhev is connected by roads with Ostrov, Opochka, Pushkinskiye Gory, and Bezhanitsy. There are also local roads.

== Culture and recreation ==
The district contains six cultural heritage monuments of federal significance and additionally forty-nine objects classified as cultural and historical heritage of local significance. The federally protected monuments are the Intercession Church in the village of Baruta, the Transfiguration Church in the village of Vekhno, the Kazan Church in the village of Posadnikovo, the Baruzdin Estate in the village of Ladino, as well as two archeological sites.

The only state museum of the district is the Novorzhev History Museum, located in Novorzhev.
