= Porkhovsky District =

Porkhovsky District Порховский район (Russian)
- District
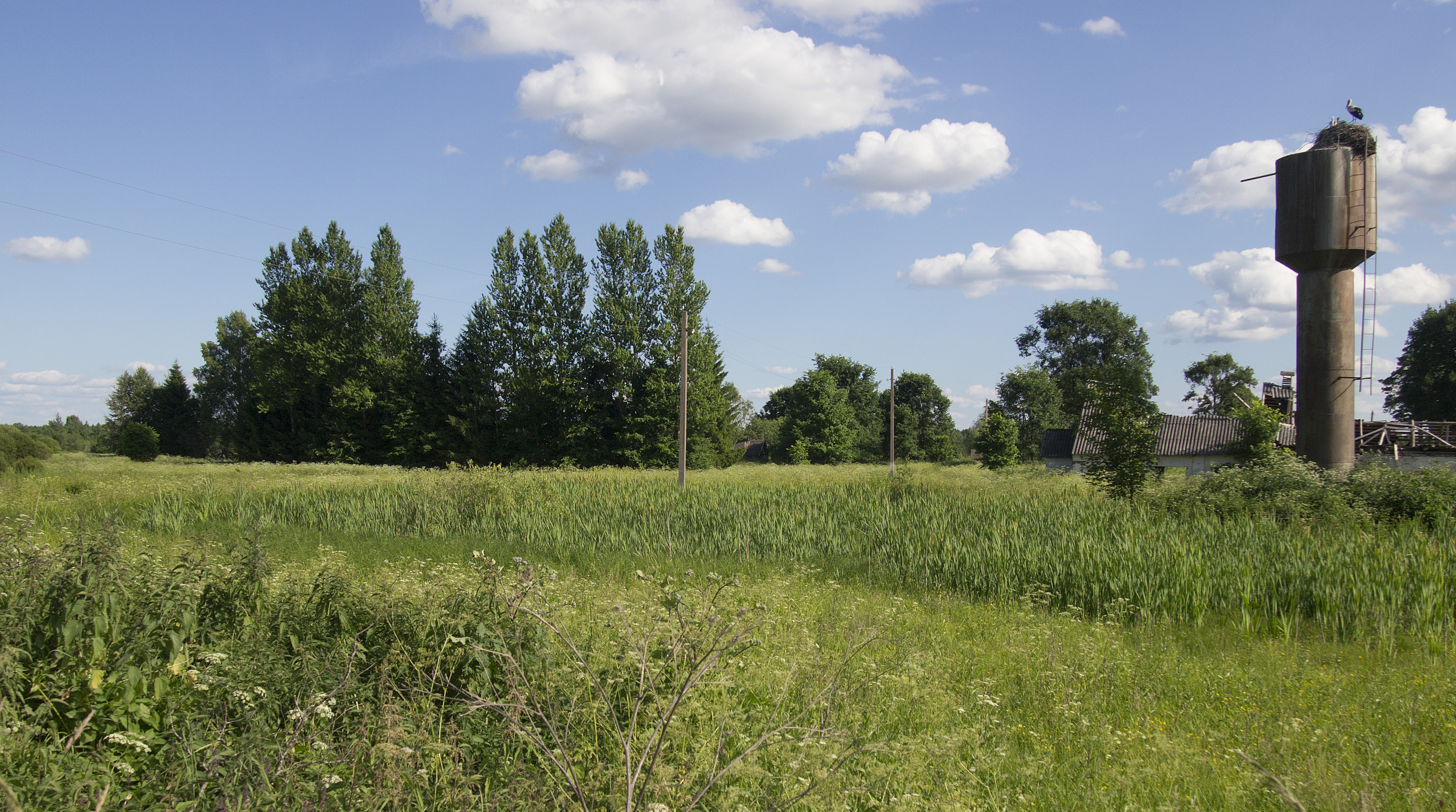
- Landscape in Porkhovsky District

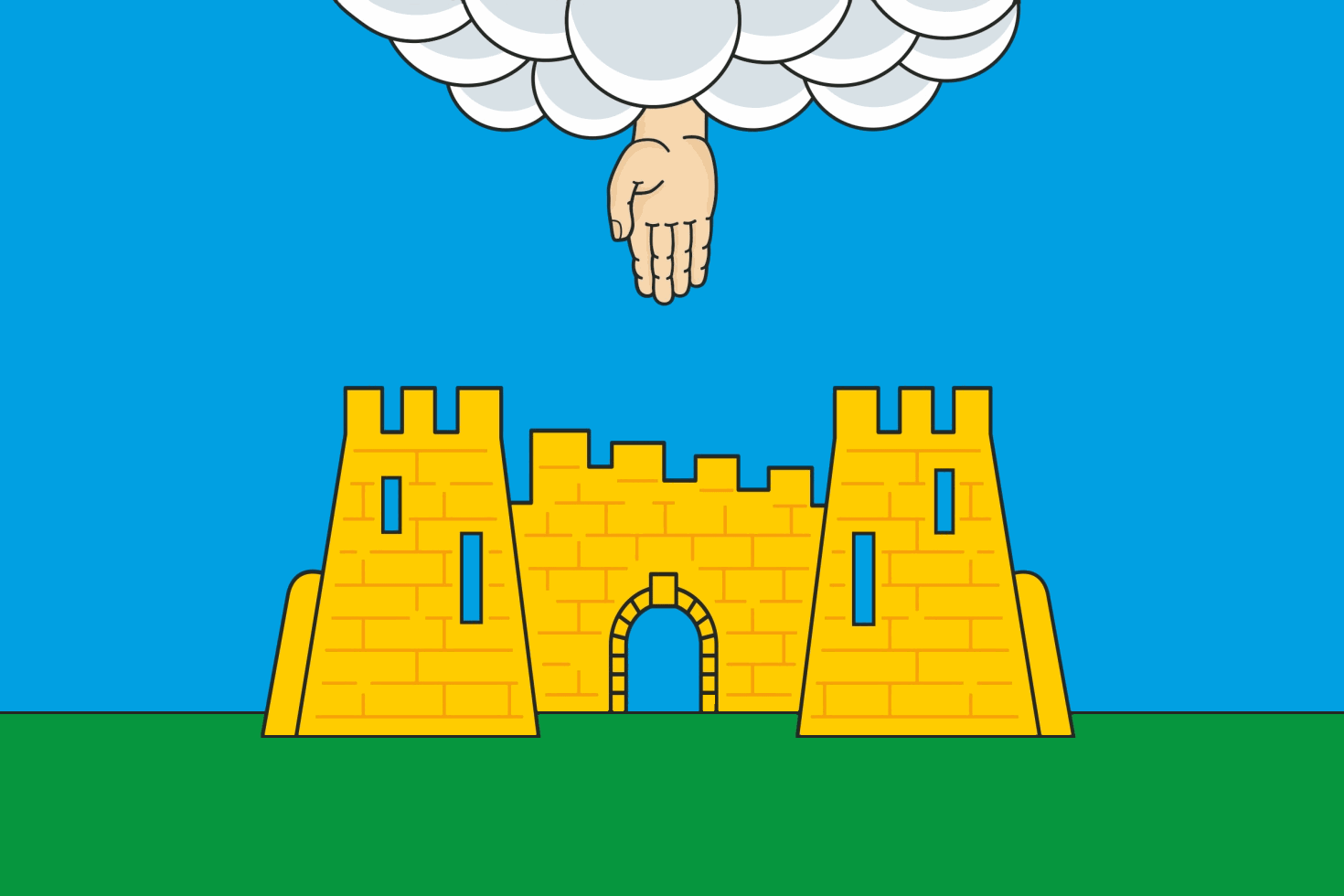
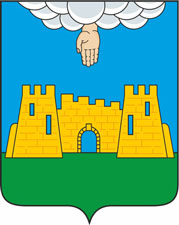
- Flag Coat of arms
- Location of Porkhovsky District in Pskov Oblast
- Coordinates: 57°46′N 29°34′E
- Country: Russia
- Federal subject: Pskov Oblast
- Established: 1927
- Administrative center: Porkhov

Area
  - Total: 3,190 km^{2} (1,230 sq mi)

Population (2010 Census)
  - Total: 21,568
  - Density: 6.76/km^{2} (17.5/sq mi)
  - Urban: 49.2%
  - Rural: 50.8%

Administrative structure
  - Inhabited localities: 1 cities/towns, 560 rural localities

Municipal structure
  - Municipally incorporated as: Porkhovsky Municipal District
  - Municipal divisions: 1 urban settlements, 8 rural settlements
- Time zone: UTC+3 (MSK)
- OKTMO ID: 58647000
- Website: http://porhov.reg60.ru/

Porkhovsky District (Russian: По́рховский райо́н) is an administrative and municipal district (raion), one of the twenty-four in Pskov Oblast, Russia. It is located in the central and northeastern parts of the oblast and borders with Strugo-Krasnensky District in the north, Soletsky District of Novgorod Oblast in the northeast, Dnovsky District in the east, Dedovichsky District in the southeast, Novorzhevsky District in the south, Ostrovsky District in the southwest, and with Pskovsky District in the west. The area of the district is 3,190 square kilometers (1,230 sq mi). Its administrative center is the town of Porkhov. Population: 21,568 (2010 census); 28,470 (2002 Census); 35,015 (1989 Soviet census). The population of Porkhov accounts for 49.2% of the district's total population.

== Geography ==
The district is located on the divide between the basins of the Narva and Neva Rivers. The southern part of the district belongs to the basin of the Velikaya River; itself in the basin of the Narva. The Cheryokha River, one of the principal tributaries of the Velikaya, flows through the district. The rivers in the north of the district drain into the Shelon, a tributary of Lake Ilmen in the Neva River basin. The Shelon also crosses the district, and, in particular, the town of Porkhov is located on the Shelon.

Lakes in the district include Lake Radilovskoye in the north and Lake Luchno in the south.

== History ==
Porkhov was founded in 1239 by Alexander Nevsky, who at the time was the Prince of Novgorod, as a fortress to strengthen the borders of Novgorod Lands. In 1346, it was besieged by Lithuanian army of Algirdas, but not conquered. In 1387, the fortress burned down and was rebuilt in stone. In 1428, it was besieged by Vytautas who again failed to conquer the fortress. After the fall of Novgorod Republic in 1478, it was, together with all Novgorod lands, annexed by the Grand Duchy of Moscow. It was a part of Shelonskaya Pyatina, one of the five pyatinas into which Novgorod lands were divided. In the course of the administrative reform carried out in 1708 by Peter the Great, the area was included into Ingermanland Governorate (known since 1710 as Saint Petersburg Governorate). Porkhov is mentioned as one of the towns into which the governorate was divided. In 1727, separate Novgorod Governorate was split off, and in 1772, Pskov Governorate (which between 1777 and 1796 existed as Pskov Viceroyalty) was established. In 1776, Porkhovsky Uyezd was transferred from Novgorod Governorate to Pskov Governorate. The area was a part of Porkhovsky, Pskovsky, and Ostrovsky Uyezds of Pskov Governorate.

On August 1, 1927, the uyezds were abolished, and Porkhovsky District was established, with the administrative center in the town of Porkhov. It included parts of former Porkhovsky Uyezd. The governorates were abolished as well, and the district became a part of Pskov Okrug of Leningrad Oblast. On July 23, 1930, the okrugs were also abolished, and the districts were directly subordinated to the oblast. Between August 1941 and February 1944, Porkhovsky District was occupied by German troops. On August 23, 1944, the district was transferred to newly established Pskov Oblast.

On August 1, 1927, Slavkovsky District was established as well, with the administrative center in the selo of Slavkovichi. It included parts of former Pskovsky and Ostrovsky Uyezds. The district was a part of Pskov Okrug of Leningrad Oblast. Between March 22, 1935 and September 19, 1940, Slavkovsky District was a part of Pskov Okrug of Leningrad Oblast, one of the okrugs abutting the state boundaries of the Soviet Union. Between August 1941 and February 1944, Slavkovsky District was occupied by German troops. On August 23, 1944, the district was transferred to Pskov Oblast. In 1959, Slavkovsky District was abolished and merged into Karamyshevsky District.

Another district established on August 1, 1927 was Karamyshevsky District, with the administrative center in the settlement of Karamyshevo. It included parts of former Pskovsky Uyezd. The district was a part of Pskov Okrug of Leningrad Oblast. On September 20, 1931, Karamyshevsky District was abolished and merged into Pskovsky District. On February 15, 1935, it was re-established. Between August 1941 and February 1944, Karamyshevsky District was occupied by German troops. On August 23, 1944, the district was transferred to Pskov Oblast. On February 1, 1963, in the course of Khrushchev's abortive administrative reform, Karamyshevsky District was abolished, and after a number of administrative transformations its territory was eventually split between Pskovsky and Porkhovsky Districts.

On August 1, 1927, Vyborsky District was also established, with the administrative center in the village of Vybor. It included parts of former Ostrovsky Uyezd. The district was a part of Pskov Okrug of Leningrad Oblast. On January 1, 1932, Vyborsky District was abolished and split between Slavkovsky and Novorzhevsky Districts.

In April 1946, Pavsky District with the administrative center in the selo of Pavy was established. It included territories formerly belonging to Strugo-Krasnensky and Porkhovsky Districts. In October 1959, Pavsky District was abolished and split between Strugo-Krasnensky and Porkhovsky Districts.

== Economy ==
=== Industry ===
The economy of the district is based on food industry and peat production.

=== Agriculture ===
The main agricultural specializations in the district are milk and meat production (cattle and swine breeding) as well as growing of crops, flax, potatoes, and vegetables.

=== Transportation ===
A railway connecting Bologoye and Pskov via Staraya Russa crosses the district from east to west. Porkhov is the principal railway station within the district.

The main roads within the district connect Porkhov with Pskov, with Ludoni (providing access to M20 highway), with Bezhanitsy, and with Veliky Novgorod via Soltsy. There are also local roads with bus traffic originating from Porkhov.

== Culture and recreation ==
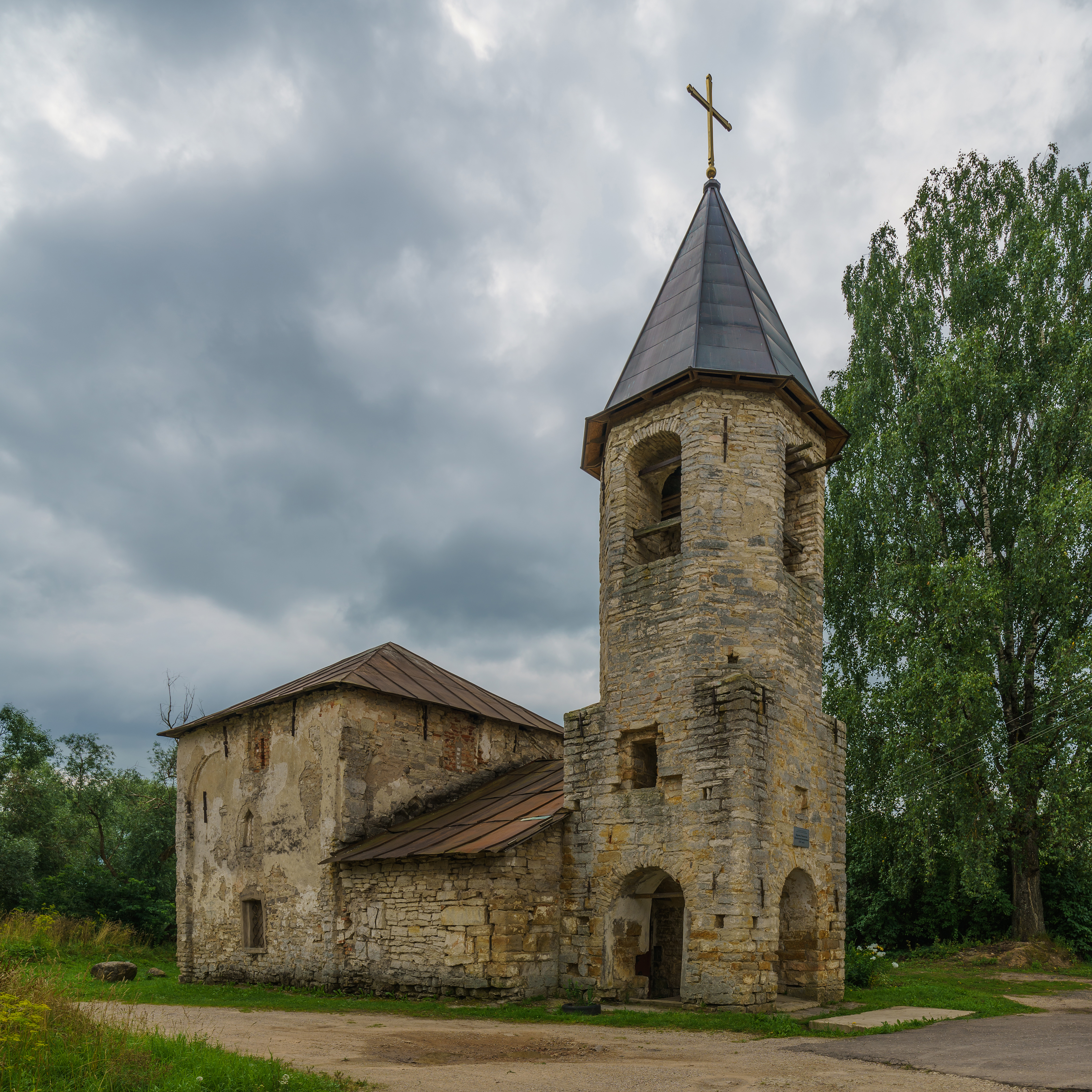
The church of the Nativity of the Theotokos in Porkhov

The district contains 24 cultural heritage monuments of federal significance and additionally 115 objects classified as cultural and historical heritage of local significance. The federally protected monuments include the Porkhov Fortress, three archeological sites, and a number of churches.

Porkhov hosts the Porkhovsky District Museum, the only state museum in the district.

Within 17 kilometers (11 mi) from Porkhov, on the bank of the Shelon River, is the Neoclassical manor of Princes Gagarin located in the village of Kholomki. In the early 1920s, Kholomki hosted an art colony that was frequented by Korney Chukovsky, Vladislav Khodasevich, Yevgeny Zamyatin, and Mstislav Dobuzhinsky. The village of Volyshevo, home to the former manor of the Stroganovs, is close at hand.
