= Opochetsky District =

Opochetsky District Опочецкий район (Russian)
- District
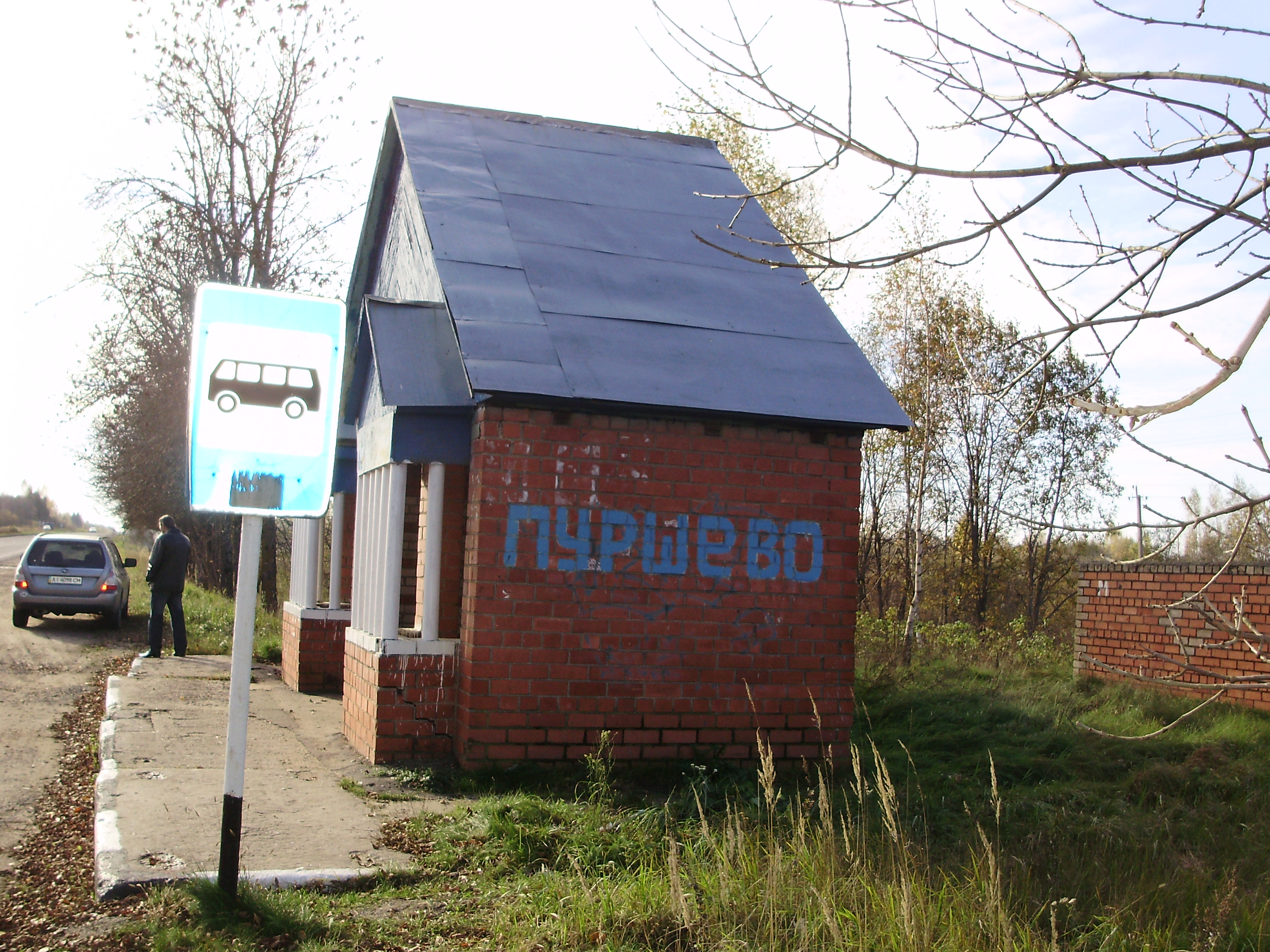
- A bus stop in the village of Purshevo in Opochetsky District

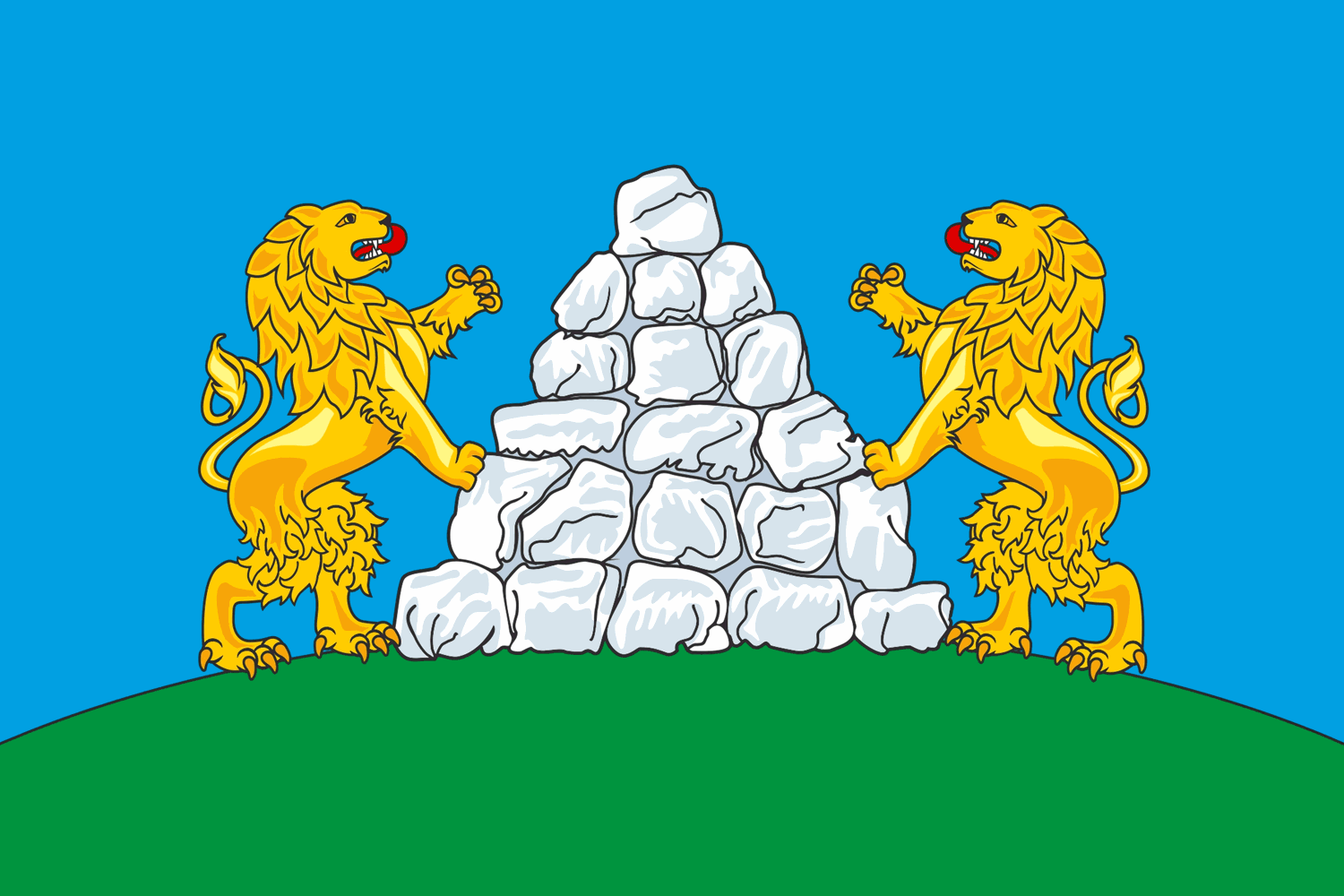
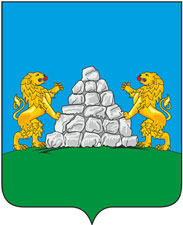
- Flag Coat of arms
- Location of Opochetsky District in Pskov Oblast
- Coordinates: 56°43′N 28°39′E
- Country: Russia
- Federal subject: Pskov Oblast
- Established: 1 August 1927
- Administrative center: Opochka

Area
  - Total: 2,028.9 km^{2} (783.4 sq mi)

Population (2010 Census)
  - Total: 18,673
  - Density: 9.2035/km^{2} (23.837/sq mi)
  - Urban: 62.1%
  - Rural: 37.9%

Administrative structure
  - Inhabited localities: 1 cities/towns, 519 rural localities

Municipal structure
  - Municipally incorporated as: Opochetsky Municipal District
  - Municipal divisions: 1 urban settlements, 7 rural settlements
- Time zone: UTC+3 (MSK)
- OKTMO ID: 58629000
- Website: http://opochka.reg60.ru/

Opochetsky District (Russian: Опо́чецкий райо́н) is an administrative and municipal district (raion), one of the twenty-four in Pskov Oblast, Russia. It is located in the southwest of the oblast and borders with Pushkinogorsky District in the north, Novorzhevsky District in the northeast, Bezhanitsky District in the east, Pustoshkinsky District in the southeast, Sebezhsky District in the south, and with Krasnogorodsky District in the west. The area of the district is 2,028.9 square kilometers (783.4 sq mi). Its administrative center is the town of Opochka. Population: 18,673 (2010 census); 23,973 (2002 Census); 28,877 (1989 Soviet census). The population of Opochka accounts for 62.1% of the district's total population.

== Geography ==
The whole of the district lies in the basin of the Velikaya River, and, consequently, of the Narva River. The Velikaya crosses the district from south to north, and the town of Opochka is located on its banks. The biggest tributaries of the Velikaya within the district are the Issa (left), the Alolya (right), and the Shest (right).

The western part of the district is flat and swampy, and the eastern part is hilly. In the southeast there are many lakes of glacial origin, the biggest of which are Lakes Velye and Kamennoye.

== History ==
Opochka was first mentioned in 1414. At the time, it was a fortress subordinate to Pskov and protecting it from the south. In the course of the administrative reform carried out in 1708 by Peter the Great, the area was included into Ingermanland Governorate (known since 1710 as Saint Petersburg Governorate). Opochka is specifically mentioned as one of the towns making up the governorate. In 1727, separate Novgorod Governorate was split off, and in 1772, Pskov Governorate (which between 1777 and 1796 existed as Pskov Viceroyalty) was established. Between 1772 and 1776, Opochka was the seat of the governorate. In 1776, the borders of the governorate were considerably altered, its seat was relocated to Pskov, and Opochka became the seat of Opochetsky Uyezd.

On August 1, 1927, the uyezds were abolished, and Opochetsky District was established, with the administrative center in the town of Opochka. It included parts of former Opochetsky Uyezd. The governorates were abolished as well, and the district became a part of Pskov Okrug of Leningrad Oblast. On July 23, 1930, the okrugs were also abolished, and the districts were directly subordinated to the oblast. On January 1, 1932, parts of abolished Krasnogorodsky District were merged into Opochetsky District. On January 29, 1935, the district was transferred to Kalinin Oblast, and on February 5 of the same year, Opochetsky District became a part of Velikiye Luki Okrug of Kalinin Oblast, one of the okrugs abutting the state boundaries of the Soviet Union. On March 5, 1935, Krasnogorodsky District was re-established. On May 11, 1937, Opochka Okrug with the seat in Opochka was established, and the district was transferred to the okrug. On February 5, 1941, the okrug was abolished. Between 1941 and 1944, Opochetsky District was occupied by German troops. On August 22, 1944, the district was transferred to newly established Velikiye Luki Oblast. On October 2, 1957, Velikiye Luki Oblast was abolished and Opochetsky District was transferred to Pskov Oblast.

On August 1, 1927, Kudeversky District with the administrative center in the selo of Kudever was also established. It included parts of former Novorzhevsky Uyezd. The district was a part of Pskov Okrug of Leningrad Oblast. On September 20, 1931, Kudeversky District was abolished and merged into Novorzhevsky District. On March 5, 1935, it was re-established as a part of Velikiye Luki Okrug of Kalinin Oblast; on May 11, 1937, the district was transferred to Opochka Okrug. On August 22, 1944, the district was transferred to Velikiye Luki Oblast. On October 2, 1957, Velikiye Luki Oblast was abolished and Kudeversky District was transferred to Pskov Oblast. On January 14, 1958, Kudeversky District was abolished and split between Bezhanitsky, Novorzhevsky, Opochetsky, and Pustoshkinsky Districts.

== Economy ==
=== Industry ===
There are enterprises of food and textile industries in Opochka.

=== Transportation ===
The M20 Highway which connects St. Petersburg and Vitebsk via Pskov crosses the district from north to south, passing Opochka. Another road connects Opochka with Sebezh and further with Polotsk. The whole stretch between Opochka and Polotsk has been a toll road since 2002. There are also local roads.

None of the rivers within the district are navigable.

== Culture and recreation ==
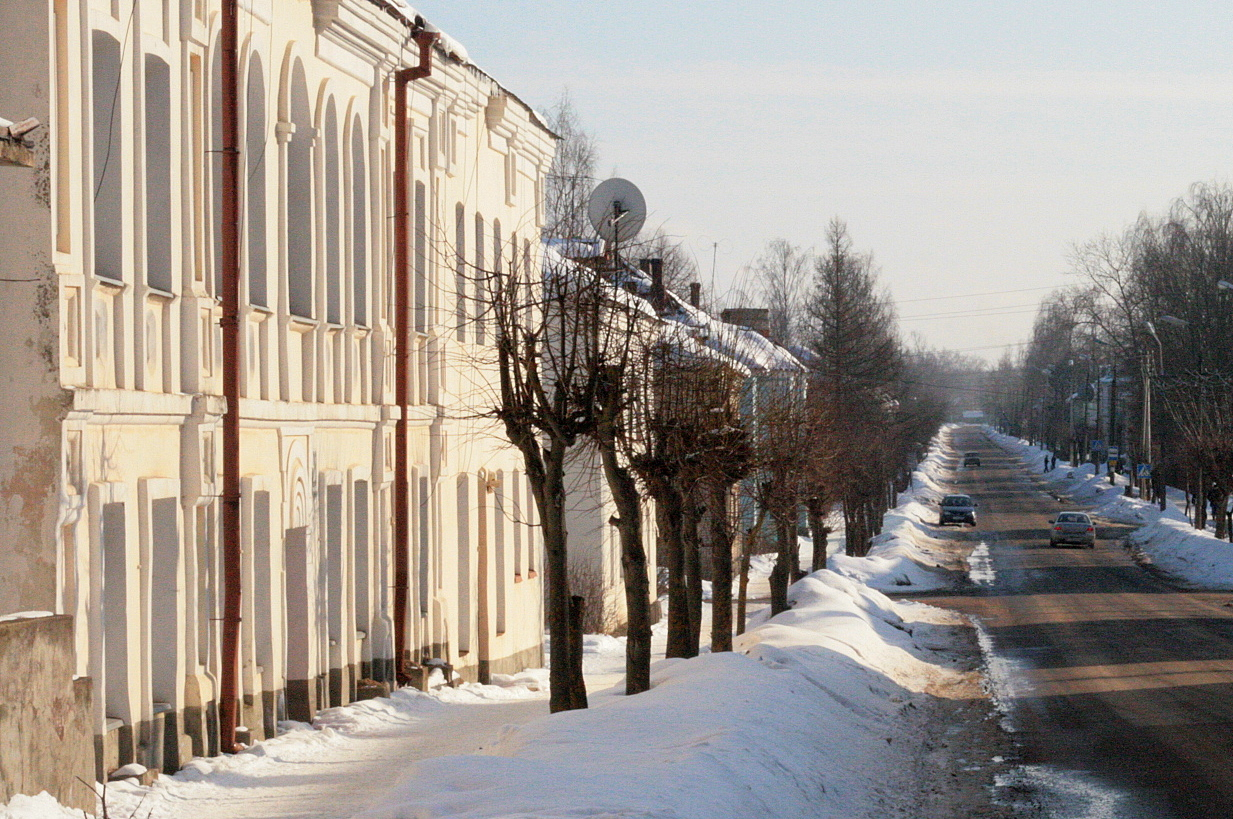
The central part of Opochka

The district contains eight cultural heritage monuments of federal significance and additionally ninety-two objects classified as cultural and historical heritage of local significance. The federally protected monuments are the Intercession Church, the postal station, the Kukolkin House, and the Chernyshyov House, all in Opochka, as well as four archeological sites.
