= Pskovsky District =

Pskovsky District Псковский район (Russian)
- District
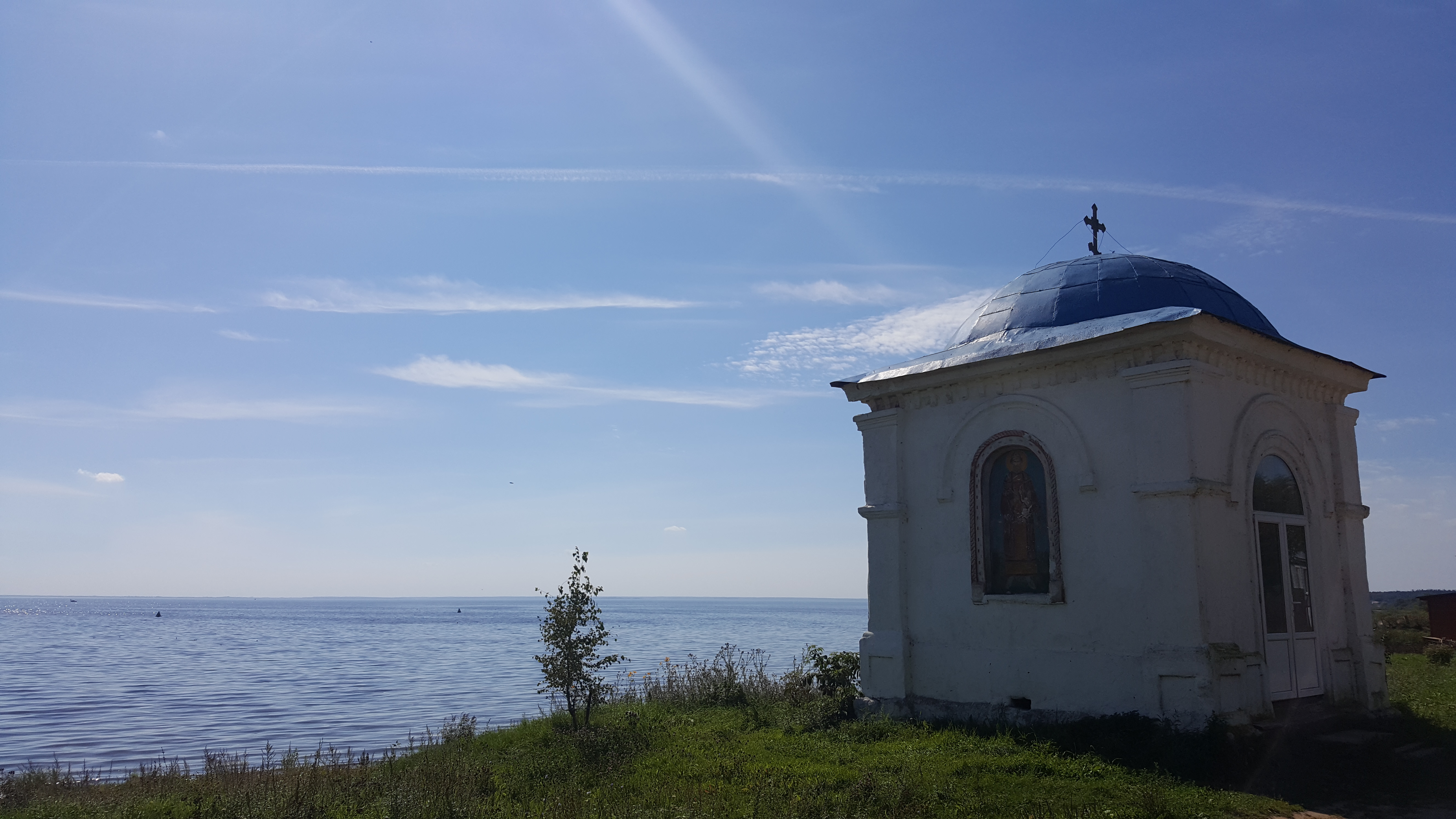
- Lakeside in Pskovsky District

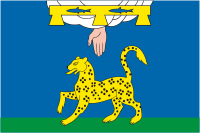
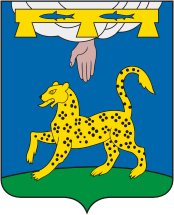
- Flag Coat of arms
- Location of Pskovsky District in Pskov Oblast
- Coordinates: 57°51′31″N 28°09′10″E
- Country: Russia
- Federal subject: Pskov Oblast
- Established: 1 August 1927
- Administrative center: Pskov

Area
  - Total: 3,600 km^{2} (1,400 sq mi)

Population (2010 Census)
  - Total: 34,323
  - Density: 9.5/km^{2} (25/sq mi)
  - Urban: 0%
  - Rural: 100%

Administrative structure
  - Inhabited localities: 627 rural localities

Municipal structure
  - Municipally incorporated as: Pskovsky Municipal District
  - Municipal divisions: 0 urban settlements, 10 rural settlements
- Time zone: UTC+3 (MSK)
- OKTMO ID: 58649000
- Website: http://pskovrajon.reg60.ru

Pskovsky District (Russian: Пско́вский райо́н) is an administrative and municipal district (raion), one of the twenty-four in Pskov Oblast, Russia. It is located in the northwest of the oblast and borders with Gdovsky District in the north, Strugo-Krasnensky District in the northeast, Porkhovsky District in the east, Ostrovsky District in the south, and with Palkinsky and Pechorsky Districts in the southwest. Lake Peipus forms the border with Estonia in the west. The area of the district is 3,600 square kilometers (1,400 sq mi). Its administrative center is the city of Pskov (which is not administratively a part of the district). Population: 34,323 (2010 census); 37,216 (2002 Census); 37,557 (1989 Soviet census).

== Geography ==
The district is located east and southeast of Lake Peipus, into which the rivers in the north of the district flow directly. The central and the southern parts of the district lie in the basin of the Velikaya River, a major tributary of Lake Peipus. The two biggest tributaries of the Velikaya within the district are the Pskova and the Cheryokha Rivers (both right). Minor areas in the east of the district lie in the basin of the Shelon River.

36% of the district's territory is covered by forests.

Remdovsky Zakaznik in the north of the district is one of three federally protected nature reserves in Pskov Oblast; it was established to protect lowlands adjacent to Lake Peipus.

== History ==
The history of the area is essentially a part of the history of Pskov. According to the tradition, Saint Olga, wife of Prince Igor and one of the most important persons in the history of Kievan Rus', was born in the village of Vybuty, located within modern borders of the district. Until the 14th century, the area, together with Pskov, was dependent on Novgorod, then became independent, and in 1510 was annexed by the Grand Duchy of Moscow.

In the course of the administrative reform carried out in 1708 by Peter the Great, the area was included into Ingermanland Governorate (known since 1710 as Saint Petersburg Governorate). In 1727, separate Novgorod Governorate was split off, and in 1772, Pskov Governorate (which between 1777 and 1796 existed as Pskov Viceroyalty) was established. The area was a part of Pskovsky Uyezd of Pskov Governorate.

On August 1, 1927, the uyezds were abolished, and Pskovsky District was established, with the administrative center in the city of Pskov (which was not a part of the district). It included parts of former Pskovsky Uyezd. The governorates were abolished as well, and the district became a part of Pskov Okrug of Leningrad Oblast. On July 23, 1930, the okrugs were also abolished, and the districts were directly subordinated to the oblast. On February 15, 1935, parts of Pskovsky District were transferred to newly established Karamyshevsky and Palkinsky Districts. Between March 22, 1935 and September 19, 1940, Pskovsky District was a part of Pskov Okrug of Leningrad Oblast, one of the okrugs abutting the state boundaries of the Soviet Union. Between August 1941 and July 1944, Pskovsky District was occupied by German troops. On August 23, 1944, the district was transferred to newly established Pskov Oblast.

On August 1, 1927, Seryodkinsky District was established as well, with the administrative center in the selo of Seryodka. It included parts of former Gdovsky Uyezd of Saint Petersburg Governorate. The district was a part of Pskov Okrug of Leningrad Oblast. In 1935, a part of the district's territory was transferred to Polnovsky District. Between August 1941 and February 1944, Seryodkinsky District was occupied by German troops. On August 23, 1944, the district was transferred to Pskov Oblast. On February 15, 1958, Seryodkinsky District was abolished and split between Gdovsky and Pskovsky Districts.

Another district established on August 1, 1927 was Karamyshevsky District, with the administrative center in the settlement of Karamyshevo. It included parts of former Pskovsky Uyezd. The district was a part of Pskov Okrug of Leningrad Oblast. On September 20, 1931, Karamyshevsky District was abolished and merged into Pskovsky District. On February 15, 1935, it was re-established. Between August 1941 and February 1944, Karamyshevsky District was occupied by German troops. On August 23, 1944, the district was transferred to Pskov Oblast. On February 1, 1963, in the course of Khrushchev's abortive administrative reform, Karamyshevsky District was abolished, and after a number of administrative transformations its territory was eventually split between Pskovsky and Porkhovsky Districts.

== Administrative and municipal status ==
Within the framework of administrative divisions, Pskovsky District is one of the twenty-four in the oblast. The city of Pskov serves as its administrative center, despite being incorporated separately as an administrative unit with the status equal to that of the districts.

As a municipal division, the district is incorporated as Pskovsky Municipal District. The City of Pskov is incorporated separately from the district as Pskov Urban Okrug.

== Restricted access ==
The western part of the district is included into a border security zone, intended to protect the borders of Russia from unwanted activity. In particular, the whole shore of Lake Peipus within the district is included into this restricted area. In order to visit the zone, a permit issued by the local Federal Security Service department is required.

== Economy ==
=== Industry ===
Pskovsky District is essentially an agricultural area, although some food industry is present. There is one plant producing reinforced concrete.

=== Agriculture ===
The main agricultural specializations in the district are swine and cattle breeding, as well as growing of crops, potatoes, and vegetables.

=== Transportation ===
Pskov is an important transport hub and, as it is completely surrounded by Pskovsky District, all communications leading to Pskov pass through the district. In particular, Pskov is connected by railroads with St. Petersburg, with Bologoye via Dno and Staraya Russa, with Tartu via Pechory, and with Riga via Ostrov and Pytalovo. All these railways cross the district. There is passenger traffic along all these railways.

The M20 highway which connects St. Petersburg and Vitebsk via Pskov crosses the district from north to south. There is a road connection from Pskov north to Gdov and further to Slantsy, another one from Pskov to Veliky Novgorod via Porkhov, and yet another one west to Riga via Izborsk, which is a part of European route E77. Pskov is the eastern terminus of this route. There are also local roads.

The lower course of the Velikaya River is navigable.

== Culture and recreation ==
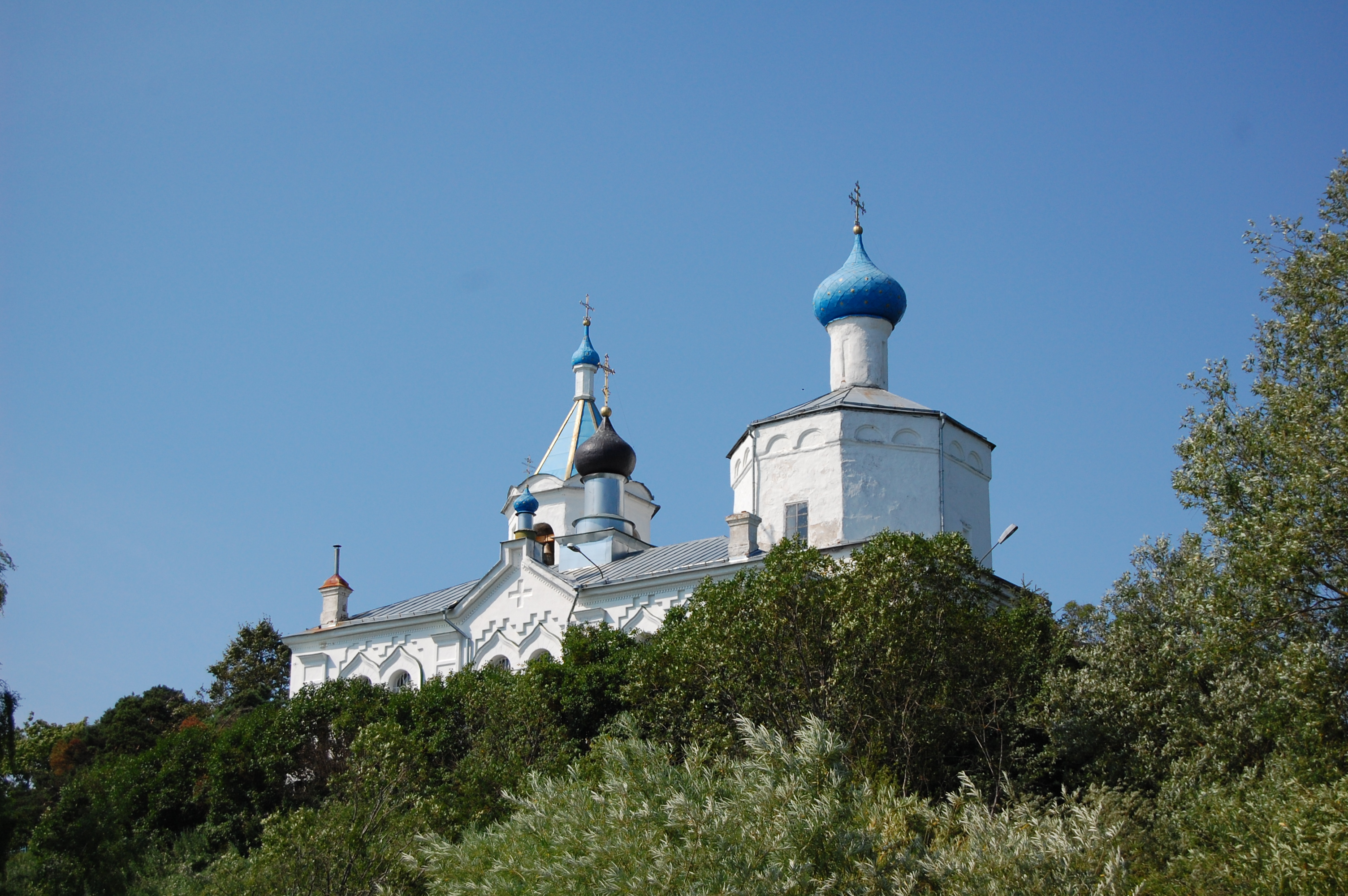
The Church of St. Matthew in the village of Piskovichi

The district contains 32 cultural heritage monuments of federal significance and additionally 111 objects classified as cultural and historical heritage of local significance. The federally protected monuments include the ensembles of Krypetsky and Yelizarov monasteries, the 15th century Church of Iliya the Prophet in the pogost of Vybuty, the Intercession Church in the pogost of Znakhlitsy, the Assumption Church in the selo of Melyotovo, the St. Nicholas Church in the selo of Ustye, and the St. George Church in the selo of Kamno, as well as a number of archeological sites and younger churches.
