= Selikhnovo =

Selikhnovo (Russian: Селихново) is the name of several rural localities (villages) in Pskov Oblast, Russia:

- Selikhnovo, Pskovsky District, Pskov Oblast, a village in Pskovsky District
- Selikhnovo, Pushkinogorsky District, Pskov Oblast, a village in Pushkinogorsky District
