= Cheryokha =

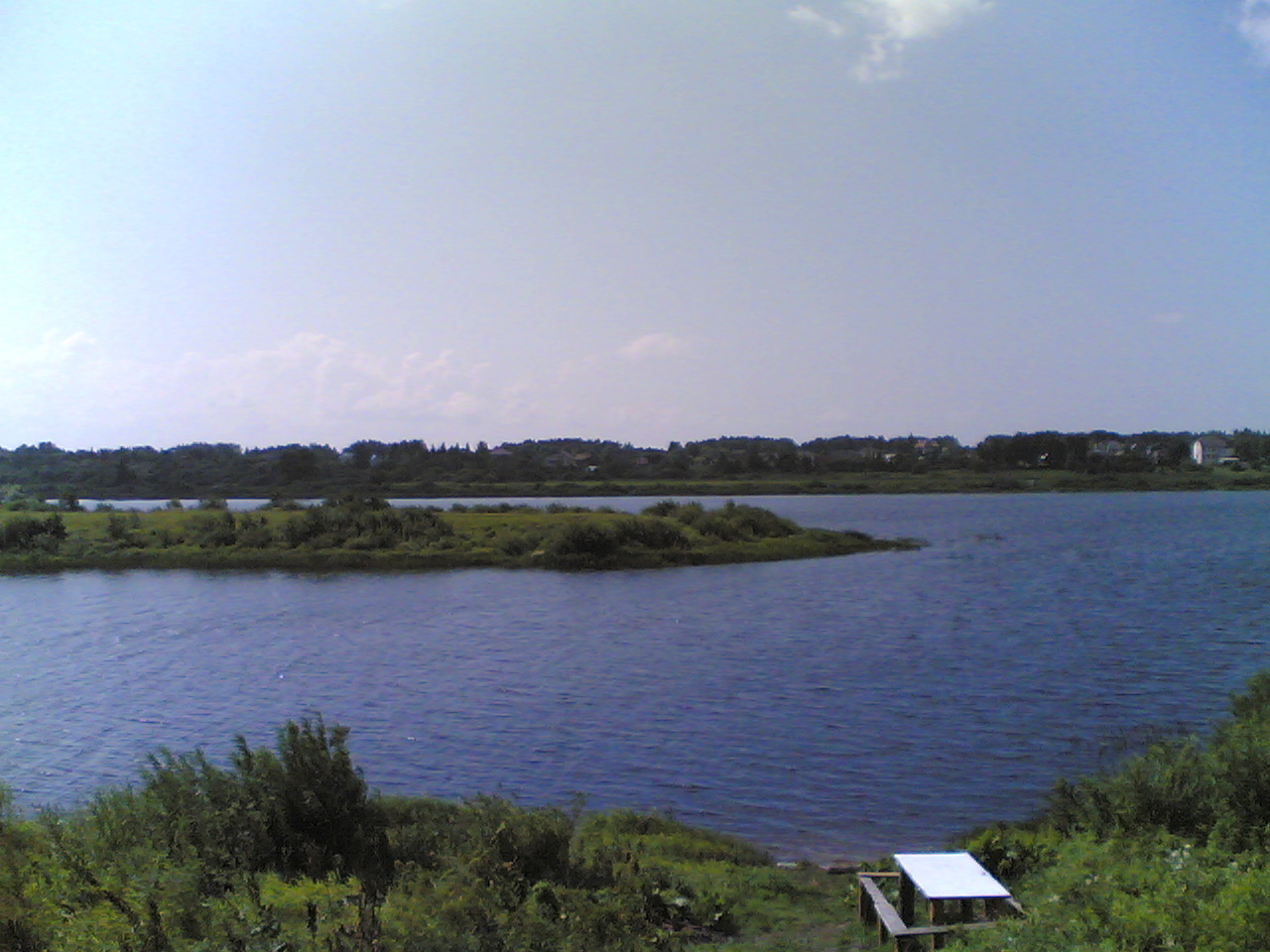
- The mouth of the Cheryokha
- Native name: Черёха (Russian)

Location
- Country: Russia

Physical characteristics
- Mouth: Velikaya
  - coordinates: 57°46′11″N 28°21′35″E
- Length: 145 km (90 mi)
- Basin size: 3,230 km^{2} (1,250 sq mi)
- Discharge
  - average: 16.3 cubic metres per second (580 cu ft/s)

Basin features
- Progression: Velikaya→ Lake Peipus→ Narva→ Gulf of Finland

The Cheryokha (Russian: Черёха) is a river in Ostrovsky, Porkhovsky, and Pskovsky Districts, and in the city of Pskov of Pskov Oblast in Russia. It is a right tributary of the Velikaya and belongs to the basin of the Narva. It is 145 kilometres (90 mi) long, and the area of its basin 3,230 square kilometres (1,250 sq mi). The main tributary is the Keb (right).

The source of the Cheryokha is Lake Chereshno, located in a swampy area southeast of the town of Ostrov. The river flows northwest, enters Porkhovsky District, and close to the border with Pskovsky District sharply turns west. On a short stretch it makes the border between Porkhovsky and Pskovsky Districts. In 8.7 kilometres (5.4 mi) upstream from the mouth the Cheryokha accepts the Keb, its biggest tributary, from the right. The last stretch of Cheryokha constitutes the border between the city of Pskov (north) and Pskovsky District (south). The Cheryokha joins the Velikaya in the southern end of the city of Pskov.

The drainage basin of the Cheryokha includes the eastern part of Ostrovsky District, the western part of Porkhovsky District, the southwestern part of Strugo-Krasnensky District, as well as the eastern part of Pskovsky District.

The last 2 kilometres (1.2 mi) of the course of the river are listed in the State Water Register of Russia as navigable.
