= Bezhanitsy =

Bezhanitsy Бежаницы
- Work settlement
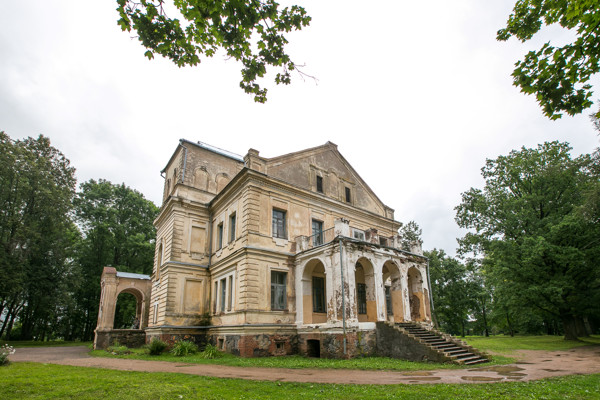

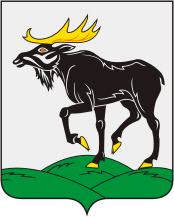
- Coat of arms
- Interactive map of Bezhanitsy
- Location of Bezhanitsy Bezhanitsy (Pskov Oblast)
- Coordinates: 56°58′N 29°53′E
- Country: Russia
- Federal subject: Pskov Oblast
- Administrative district: Bezhanitsky District
- First mentioned: 1581
- Urban-type settlement status since: 1961
- Elevation: 117 m (384 ft)

Population (2010 Census)
  - Total: 4,333
  - Estimate (2021): 3,731 (−13.9%)

Administrative status
  - Capital of: Bezhanitsky District

Municipal status
  - Municipal district: Bezhanitsky Municipal District
  - Urban settlement: Bezhanitsy Urban Settlement
  - Capital of: Bezhanitsky Municipal District, Bezhanitsy Urban Settlement
- Time zone: UTC+3 (MSK)
- Postal code: 182840
- OKTMO ID: 58604151051

Bezhanitsy (Russian: Бежаницы) is an urban locality (a work settlement) and the administrative center of Bezhanitsky District of Pskov Oblast, Russia. It is one of the two urban-type settlements in the district. Population: 4,333 (2010 census); 4,846 (2002 census); 6,789 (1989 Soviet census).

== History ==
Historical affiliations

Tsardom of Russia 1581–1721
Russian Empire 1721–1917
Russian Republic 1917
Soviet Russia 1917–1922
Soviet Union 1922–1991
Russian Federation 1991–present

Bezhanitsy was founded in the 16th century and was first mentioned in 1581. In the course of the administrative reform carried out in 1708 by Peter the Great, the area was included into Ingermanland Governorate (known since 1710 as Saint Petersburg Governorate). In 1727, separate Novgorod Governorate was split off, and in 1772, Pskov Governorate (which between 1777 and 1796 existed as Pskov Viceroyalty) was established. Bezhanitsy was a part of Pustorzhevsky Uyezd, which in 1777 was renamed Novorzhevsky Uyezd of Pskov Viceroyalty. In 1796, when the viceroyalty was abolished, the uyezd was abolished as well, however, it was re-established in 1802. In the middle of the 18th century Bezhanitsy, which was located on the road connecting Porkhov and Velikiye Luki, quickly developed as a center of yam, the state-sponsored transportation.

On August 1, 1927, the uyezds were abolished, and Bezhanitsky District was established, with the administrative center in the selo of Bezhanitsy. The governorates were abolished as well, and the district became a part of Pskov Okrug of Leningrad Oblast. On July 23, 1930, the okrugs were also abolished, and the districts were directly subordinated to the oblast. On January 29, 1935 the district was transferred to Kalinin Oblast, and on February 5 Bezhanitsky District became a part of Velikiye Luki Okrug of Kalinin Oblast, one of the okrugs abutting the state boundaries of the Soviet Union. On May 11, 1937 the district was transferred to Opochka Okrug. On May 4, 1938 the district was directly subordinated to Kalinin Oblast. Between 1941 and 1944, Bezhanitsy was occupied by German troops. On August 22, 1944, the district was transferred to newly established Velikiye Luki Oblast. On October 2, 1957 Velikiye Luki Oblast was abolished, and the district was transferred to Pskov Oblast.

On August 7, 1961 Bezhanitsy was granted urban-type settlement status.

== Economy ==
=== Industry ===
Bezhanitsy has a number of enterprises in the construction industry.

=== Transportation ===
Bezhanitsy is connected by road with Porkhov, Velikiye Luki (via Loknya), and Novorzhev. There are also local roads with bus traffic originating from Bezhanitsy.

== Culture and recreation ==
In 1908, the funeral chapel of Dmitry Filosofov, the minister of trade and industry, was built in Bezhanitsy.
