= Novorzhev =

Town in Pskov Oblast, Russia

Novorzhev Новоржев
- Town
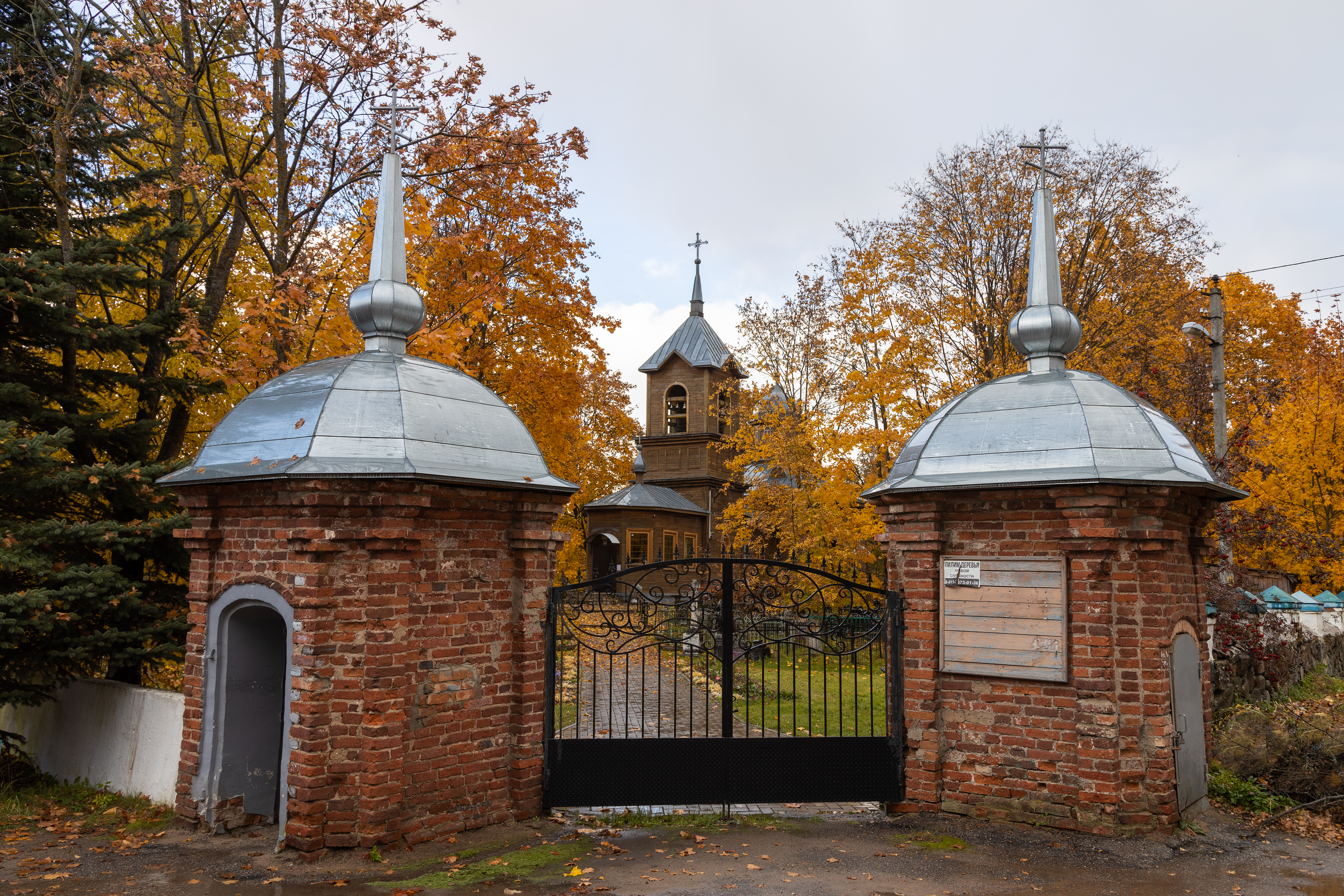

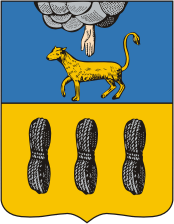
- Coat of arms
- Interactive map of Novorzhev
- Location of Novorzhev Novorzhev (Pskov Oblast)
- Coordinates: 57°02′N 29°21′E
- Country: Russia
- Federal subject: Pskov Oblast
- Administrative district: Novorzhevsky District
- Founded: 1777
- Town status since: 1777
- Elevation: 75 m (246 ft)

Population (2010 Census)
  - Total: 3,695
  - Estimate (2021): 3,222 (−12.8%)

Administrative status
  - Capital of: Novorzhevsky District

Municipal status
  - Municipal district: Novorzhevsky Municipal District
  - Urban settlement: Novorzhev Urban Settlement
  - Capital of: Novorzhevsky Municipal District, Novorzhev Urban Settlement
- Time zone: UTC+3 (MSK)
- Postal code: 182440
- OKTMO ID: 58623101001
- Website: gorodnovorzhev.ru

Novorzhev (Russian: Новорже́в) is a town and the administrative center of Novorzhevsky District in Pskov Oblast, Russia, located on the Sorot River 144 kilometers (89 mi) southeast of Pskov, the administrative center of the oblast. Population: 3,695 (2010 census); 4,125 (2002 census); 5,050 (1989 Soviet census).

== History ==
It was founded in 1777 during Catherine the Great's municipal reform as a town and the seat of newly created Novorzhevsky Uyezd in Pskov Viceroyalty. In 1796, when the viceroyalty was abolished and transformed into Pskov Governorate, the uyezd was abolished as well; however, it was re-established in 1802.

On August 1, 1927, the uyezds and governorates were abolished and Novorzhevsky District, with the administrative center in Novorzhev, was established as a part of Pskov Okrug of Leningrad Oblast. It included parts of former Novorzhevsky Uyezd. On July 23, 1930, the okrugs were also abolished and the districts were directly subordinated to the oblast. On January 29, 1935, the district was transferred to Kalinin Oblast, and on February 5, Novorzhevsky District became a part of Velikiye Luki Okrug of Kalinin Oblast, one of the okrugs abutting the state boundaries of the Soviet Union. On May 11, 1937, the district was transferred to Opochka Okrug. On February 5, 1941, the okrug was abolished. During World War II, Novorzhev was under German occupation from 17 July 1941 until 29 February 1944. In 1944, the town was completely destroyed but it was rebuilt after the war. On August 23, 1944, the district was transferred to newly established Pskov Oblast.

== Administrative and municipal status ==
Within the framework of administrative divisions, Novorzhev serves as the administrative center of Novorzhevsky District, to which it is directly subordinated. As a municipal division, the town of Novorzhev is incorporated within Novorzhevsky Municipal District as Novorzhev Urban Settlement.

== Economy ==
=== Industry ===
A factory producing electric equipment and a textile factory operate in Novorzhev.

=== Transportation ===
The town is connected by roads with Ostrov, Opochka, Pushkinskiye Gory, and Bezhanitsy. There are also local roads.

== Culture and recreation ==
Novorzhev contains six cultural heritage monuments classified as cultural and historical heritage of local significance. Most of them are monuments to soldiers fallen in World War II.

The town hosts the Novorzhev History Museum. This contains the art collection of the University of Tartu Museum which was transferred to it temporarily for safe keeping during World War I
