= Porkhovsky Uyezd =

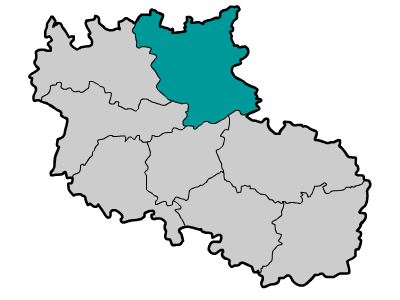

Porkhovsky Uyezd (По́рховский уе́зд) was one of the subdivisions of the Pskov Governorate of the Russian Empire. It was situated in the northern part of the governorate. Its administrative centre was Porkhov.

== Demographics ==
At the time of the Russian Empire Census of 1897, Porkhovsky Uyezd had a population of 175,853. Of these, 97.8% spoke Russian, 0.7% Belarusian, 0.5% Estonian, 0.3% Latvian, 0.3% Yiddish, 0.2% German, 0.1% Polish and 0.1% Finnish as their native language.
