= Pskov Viceroyalty =

1777–1796 unit of Russia

Coordinates: 57°49′N 28°20′E

Pskov Viceroyalty Псковское наместничество
- Viceroyalty of the Russian Empire
- 1777–1796
- Capital: Pskov
- History
  - Established: 4 September [O.S. 23 August] 1777
  - Disestablished: 23 December [O.S. 12 December] 1796

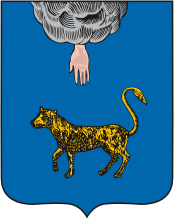
Pskov, coat of arms (1781)

Pskov Viceroyalty (Russian: Псковское наместничество, romanized: Pskovskoye namestnichestvo) was an administrative-territorial unit (namestnichestvo) of the Russian Empire, which existed in 1777–1796. The seat of the Viceroyalty was located in Pskov. Both the predecessor and the successor of the viceroyalty was Pskov Governorate. In terms of modern administrative division of Russia, the area of the viceroyalty is currently split between Pskov, Leningrad, Tver, and Novgorod Oblasts.

== History ==
Pskov Governorate with the seat in the town of Opochka was established in 1772 to accommodate vast areas transferred to the Russian Empire as the result of the First Partition of Poland. The governorate was too big for practical governance, and in 1776, it was divided into Pskov (with the seat in Pskov) and Polotsk Governorates. According to the general line of the administrative reforms by Catherine the Great, on 23 August 1777 the governorate was transformed into viceroyalty. Simultaneously, Luga (newly founded), Kholm, and Novorzhev (formerly Arshansky Stan) obtained the town status, and Izborsk, though retained the town status, ceased to be the center of an uyezd. The vice-royalty was subdivided into ten uyezds,

- Pskovsky Uyezd (with the administrative center located in Pskov);
- Gdovsky Uyezd (Gdov);
- Kholmsky Uyezd (Kholm);
- Luzhsky Uyezd (Luga);
- Novorzhevsky Uyezd (Novorzhev);
- Opochetsky Uyezd (Opochka);
- Ostrovsky Uyezd (Ostrov);
- Porkhovsky Uyezd (Porkhov);
- Toropetsky Uyezd (Toropets);
- Velikoluksky Uyezd (Velikiye Luki).

On 11 November 1777 Gdovsky and Luzhsky Uyezds were transferred to Saint Petersburg Governorate, and on 7 June 1782 Pechorsky Uyezd, with the administrative center in Pechory, was established by splitting Pskovsky Uyezd.

In 1796, Paul I performed a new administrative reform. Kholmsky, Novorzhevsky, and Pechorsky Uyezds were abolished, and the viceroyalty was transformed into Pskov Governorate in the same borders.

== Governors ==
The administration of the viceroyalty was performed by a namestnik (vice-roy) and controlled by a governor general. The governors of Pskov Viceroyalty were

- 1777 Khristophor Romanovich Nolken;
- 1778-1781 Pavel Dmitriyevich Mansurov;
- 1781-1785 Alexey Nikitovich Kozhin;
- 1785-1788 Ivan Alfyorovich Pol;
- 1788-1796 Khariton Lukich Zuyev.

The namestniks were

- 1778-1781 Yakov Yefimovich Sivers (Jacob Sievers);
- 1792-1793 Ivan Andreyevich (Otto Heinrich) Igelstrom;
- 1793-1795 Grigory Mikhaylovich Osipov.
