= Novorzhevsky Uyezd =

Historical administrative subdivision in the Russian Empire

Novorzhevsky Uyezd (Новоржевский уезд) was one of the subdivisions of the Pskov Governorate of the Russian Empire. It was situated in the central part of the governorate. Its administrative centre was Novorzhev.

== Demographics ==
At the time of the Russian Empire Census of 1897, Novorzhevsky Uyezd had a population of 113,769. Of these, 97.9% spoke Russian, 0.7% Latvian, 0.4% Yiddish, 0.4% Estonian, 0.2% Finnish, 0.1% German, 0.1% Polish and 0.1% Romani as their native language.
