= Porkhov =

Town in Pskov Oblast, Russia

Porkhov Порхов
- Town
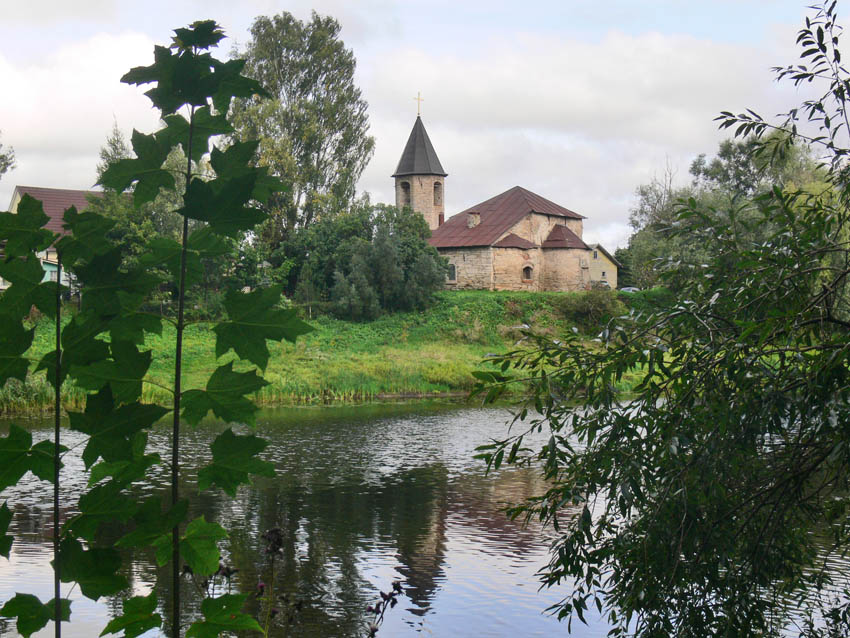
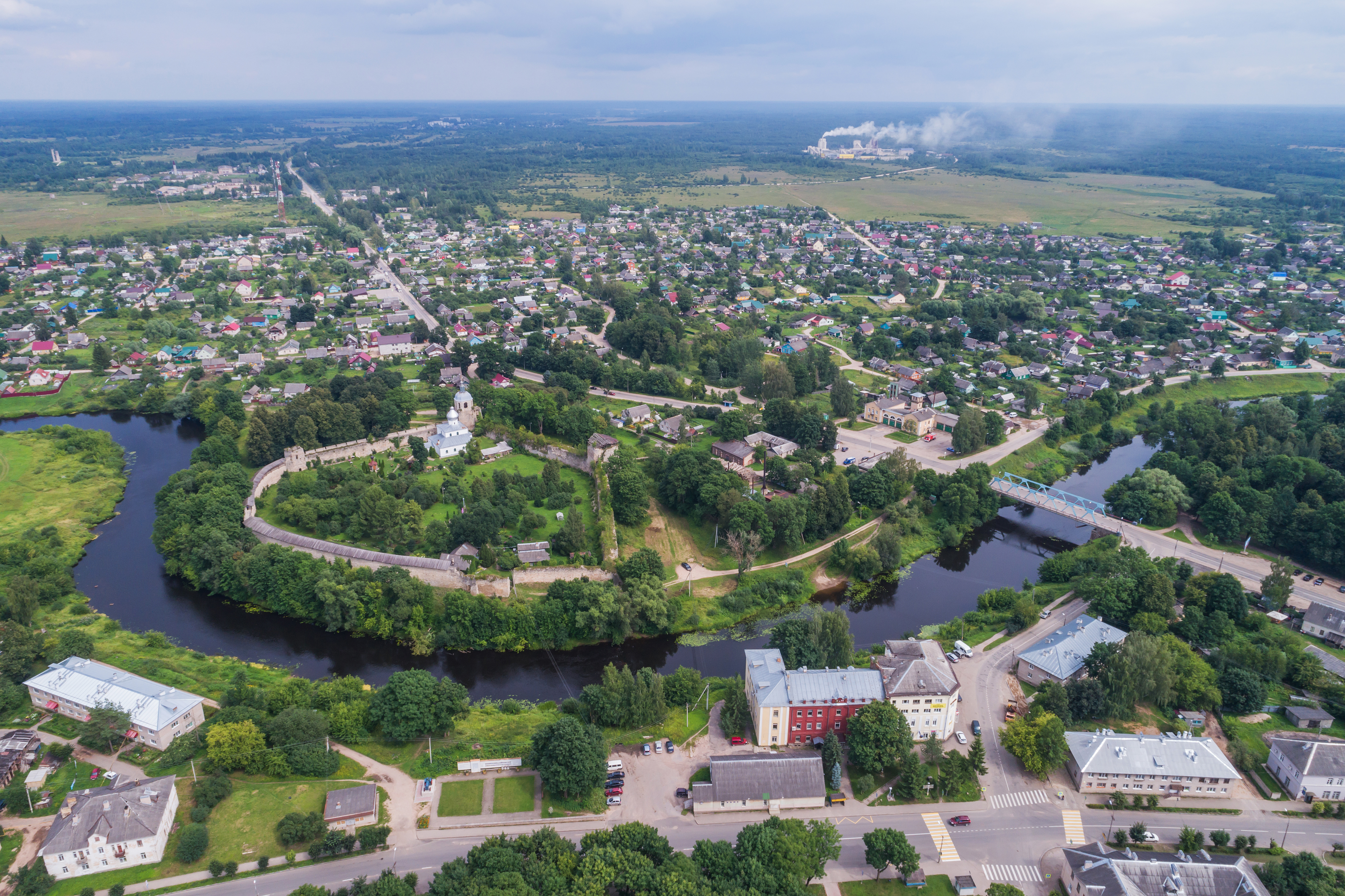
- From bottom to top: Church of the Nativity of the Blessed Virgin Mary • Porkhov Fortress

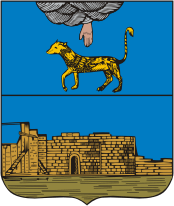
- Coat of arms
- Interactive map of Porkhov
- Location of Porkhov Porkhov (Pskov Oblast)
- Coordinates: 57°47′N 29°34′E
- Country: Russia
- Federal subject: Pskov Oblast
- Administrative district: Porkhovsky District
- Founded: 1239
- Elevation: 55 m (180 ft)

Population (2010 Census)
  - Total: 10,608
  - Estimate (2021): 7,309 (−31.1%)

Administrative status
  - Capital of: Porkhovsky District

Municipal status
  - Municipal district: Porkhovsky Municipal District
  - Urban settlement: Porkhov Urban Settlement
  - Capital of: Porkhovsky Municipal District, Porkhov Urban Settlement
- Time zone: UTC+3 (MSK)
- Postal codes: 182620, 182629
- OKTMO ID: 58647101001

Porkhov (Russian: По́рхов) is a town and the administrative center of Porkhovsky District in Pskov Oblast, Russia, located on the Shelon River, 75 kilometers (47 mi) east of Pskov, the administrative center of the oblast. Population: 10,608 (2010 census); 12,263 (2002 census); 14,170 (1989 Soviet census).

== History ==
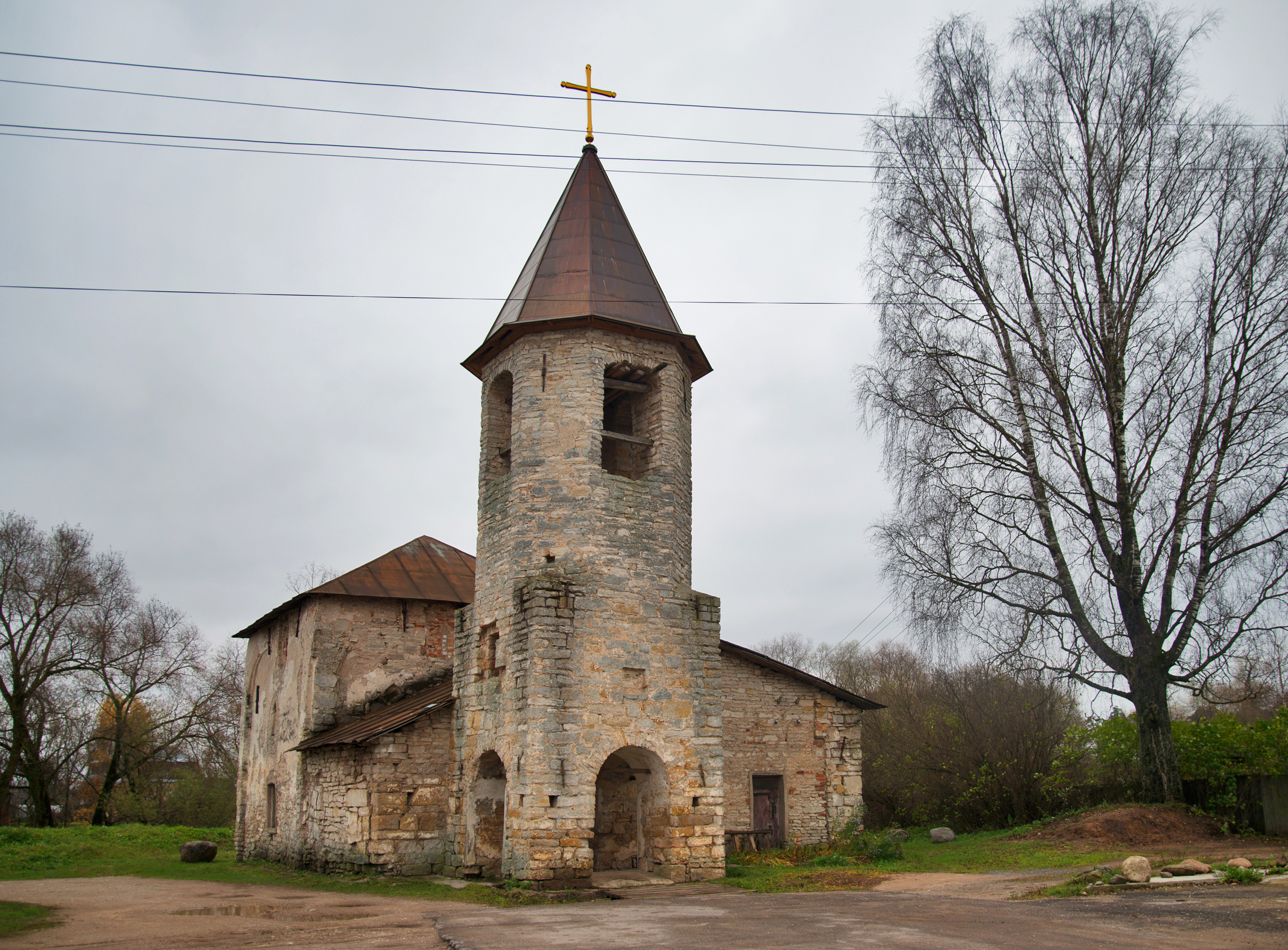
Nativity church

The fortress of Porkhov is believed to have been founded in 1239 by Alexander Nevsky. The timber fortress was sacked by Algirdas (Olgierd) in 1356 and fell in flames in 1387. The Novgorod Republic immediately rebuilt its fortifications in limestone 1.3 kilometers (0.81 mi) downstream. In 1428, Grand Duke of Lithuania Vytautas destroyed the western wall by artillery fire and entered Porkhov. Two years later, the Novgorodians augmented the fortress and rebuilt its walls. After the fall of Novgorod to the Muscovites in 1478, the fortress lost its military importance.

Porkhov was the second most important town of Shelon Pyatina, after Russa. It was not, however, a significant economical center—there were only seventy-six homesteads there in the 15th century and almost all of them were peasant ones.

In 1606, it was captured by Sweden. In the late 19th century, sizeable trade in linen and grain was conducted there.

During World War II, Porkhov was occupied by German troops from July 11, 1941 to February 26, 1944 and was a place of a concentration camp Dulag 100.

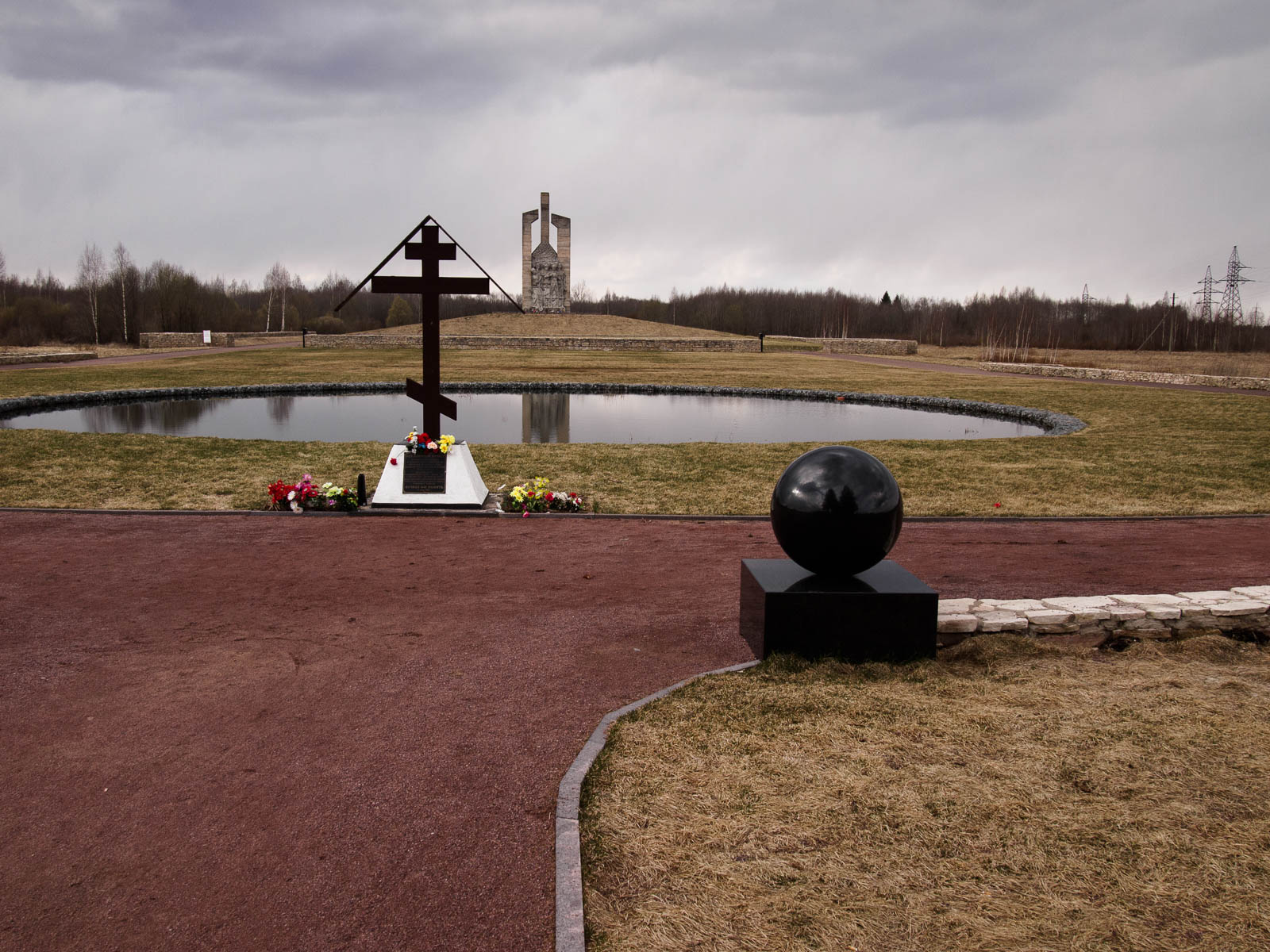
Monument to the victims of the German concentration camp Dulag 100 near Porkhov

The town of Porkhov, together with Porkhovsky District, was transferred to newly established Pskov Oblast from Leningrad Oblast on August 23, 1944.

== Administrative and municipal status ==
Within the framework of administrative divisions, Porkhov serves as the administrative center of Porkhovsky District, to which it is directly subordinated. As a municipal division, the town of Porkhov is incorporated within Porkhovsky Municipal District as Porkhov Urban Settlement.

== Architecture ==
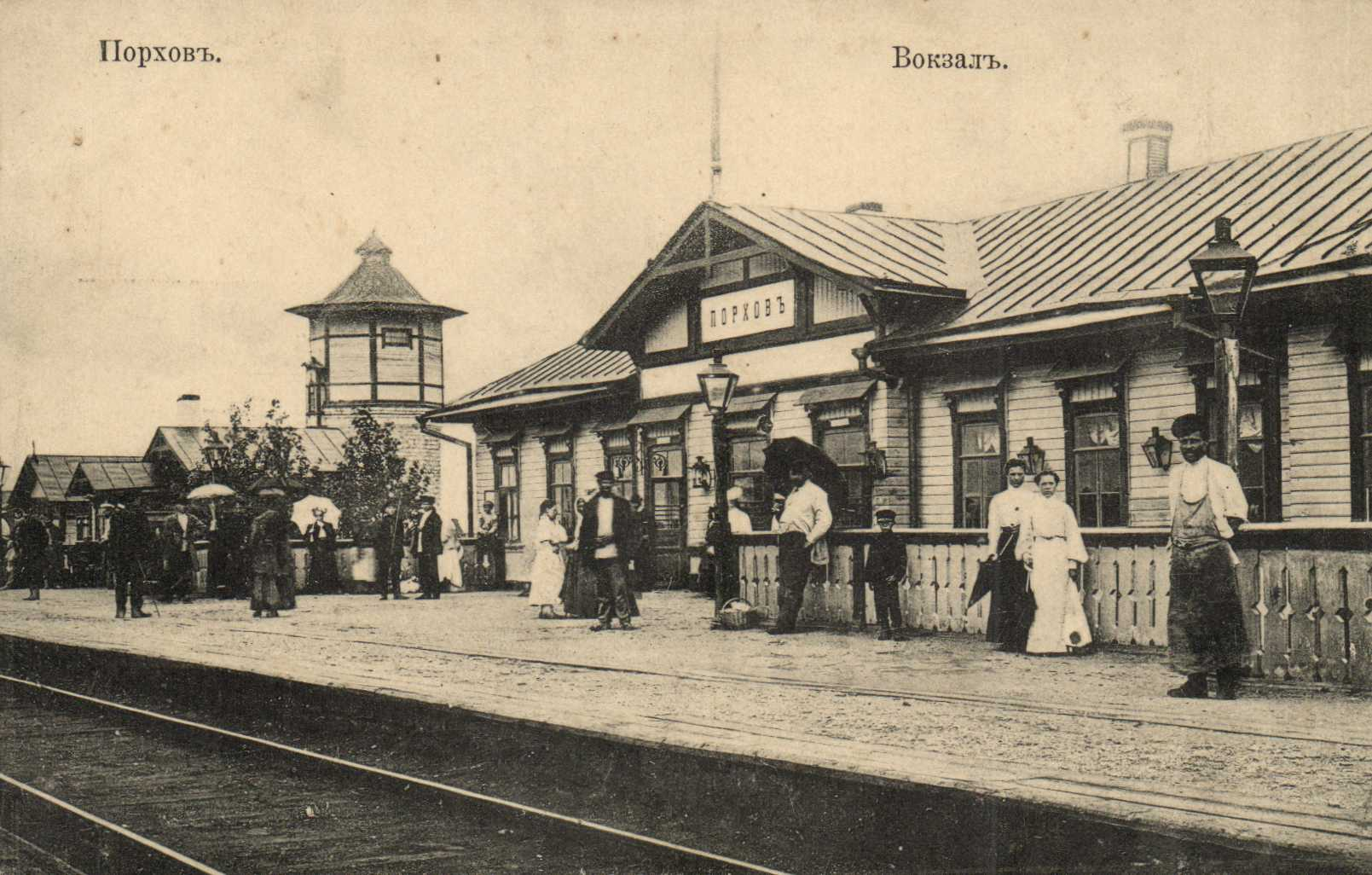
Porkhov railway station

The fortress consists of a well-preserved encircling wall; two towers, one of which is half-ruined; a diminutive church from 1412, and a museum of local history. Inside the fortress there are a great many trees and plants. The church of the Virgin's Nativity, a remarkable monumental erection of the 14th century, was disfigured during the Soviet period (picture). Another church of note in Porkhov is the Savior church (1670).
