= Zilupe (disambiguation) =

Zilupe may refer to:

- Zilupe, a town in Latvia
- Zilupe Municipality, Latvia
- Zilupe, the Latvian name for the Sinyaya, a river in Latvia, Belarus and Russia
