= Sosnovy Bor, Sebezhsky District, Pskov Oblast =

Sosnovy Bor Сосновый Бор
- Work settlement
- Interactive map of Sosnovy Bor
- Location of Sosnovy Bor Sosnovy Bor (Pskov Oblast)
- Coordinates: 56°14′25″N 28°19′03″E
- Country: Russia
- Federal subject: Pskov Oblast
- Administrative district: Sebezhsky District
- Founded: 1959

Population (2010 Census)
  - Total: 2,877
  - Estimate (2021): 1,888 (−34.4%)

Municipal status
  - Municipal district: Sebezhsky Municipal District
  - Urban settlement: Sosnovy Bor Urban Settlement
  - Capital of: Sosnovy Bor Urban Settlement
- Time zone: UTC+3 (MSK)
- Postal code: 182251
- OKTMO ID: 58654158051

Sosnovy Bor (Russian: Сосно́вый Бор) is an urban locality (a work settlement) in Sebezhsky District of Pskov Oblast, Russia, located southwest of the town of Sebezh and immediately west of Sebezhsky National Park. Municipally, it is incorporated as Sosnovy Bor Urban Settlement, one of the three urban settlements in the district. Population: 2,877 (2010 Census); 1,860 (2002 Census).

== History ==
Sosnovy Bor was founded in 1959 as Sebezh-5. It was a settlement serving a secret military installation. On September 1, 1997, the installation was abolished in accordance with the START II treaty. On December 18, 1997, Sebezh-5 was renamed Sosnovy Bor and transformed into a work settlement. The military facilities were transferred to the Ministry of Internal Affairs to be used as a prison.

In 2006, Sosnovy Bor was included into a border security zone, intended to protect the borders of Russia from unwanted activity, but in 2007 it was removed from the zone.

== Economy ==
Sosnovy Bor is a location of a large prison and provides the corresponding infrastructure.

=== Transportation ===
Sosnovy Bor is connected by a road with Sebezh. It is the terminal point of the road.
