= Sinyaya =

River in Latvia and Belarus

Sinyaya Russian: Синяя Latvian: Zilupe Belarusian: Сінюха
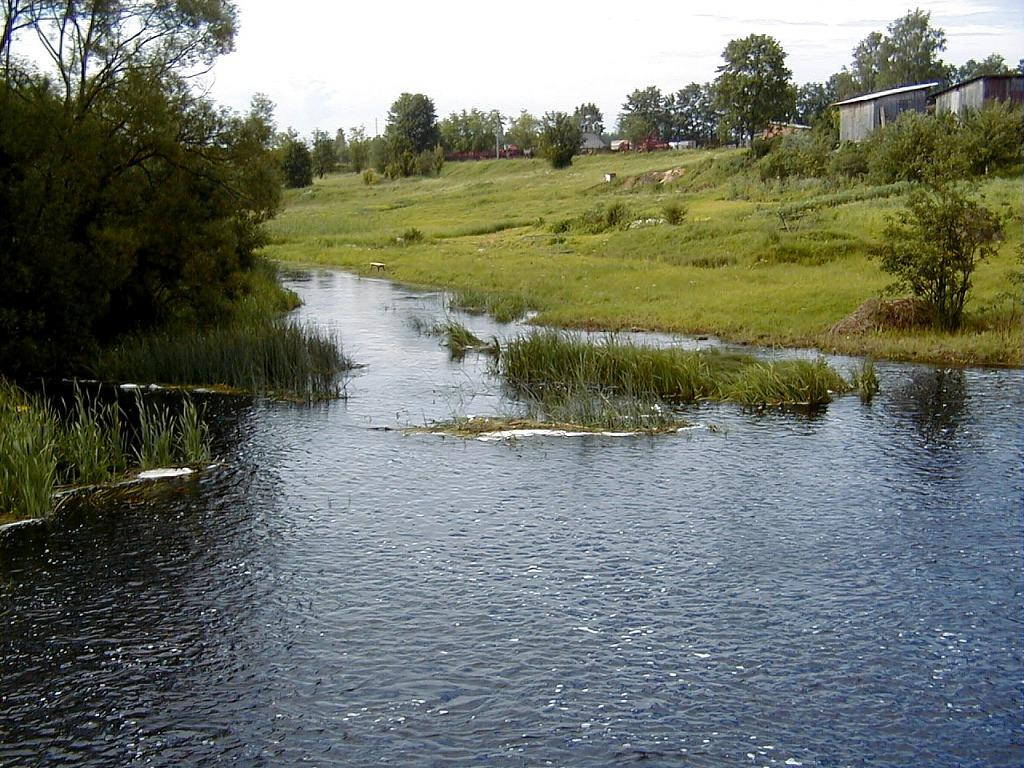
- Zilupe (Sinyaya) near Zilupe, Latvia

Location
- Country: Belarus, Latvia, Russia

Physical characteristics
- Source
  - location: Lake Osveya
- Mouth: Velikaya
  - coordinates: 57°09′46″N 28°30′39″E
- Length: 195 km (121 mi)
- Basin size: 2,040 km^{2} (790 sq mi)

Basin features
- Progression: Velikaya→ Lake Peipus→ Narva→ Gulf of Finland

The Sinyaya (Russian: Синяя, Belarusian: Сінюха, Latvian: Zilupe) is a river in Verkhnyadzvinsk Raion of Vitebsk Region of Belarus, in Zilupe, Ludza, and Cibla municipalities of Latvia, and in Sebezhsky, Krasnogorodsky, and Ostrovsky Districts of Pskov Oblast in Russia, part of the Baltic Sea basin. It is a left tributary of the Velikaya River. It is 195 kilometres (121 mi) long, and the area of its basin 2,040 square kilometres (790 sq mi).

Its source of the Sinyaya is Lake Osveya, Belarus, close to the place where the borders of Belarus, Latvia and Russia meet. After a short stretch it flows along the Belarus-Latvia border, then turns north and makes the Latvia-Russia border. It further departs from the border into the Latvian side, and flows through the town of Zilupe. North of Zilupe, it returns to the border. Even further north, the river turns northeast and enters Russia. It flows through the urban-type settlement of Krasnogorodsk and turns east in the selo of Venyavino. The mouth of the Sinyaya is in the village of Ustye.
