= Sebezhsky =

Sebezhsky (masculine), Sebezhskaya (feminine), or Sebezhskoye (neuter) may refer to:

- Sebezhsky District, a district of Pskov Oblast, Russia
- Sebezhskoye, a rural locality (a settlement) in Kaliningrad Oblast, Russia
