= Krasnogorodsky District =

Krasnogorodsky District Красногородский район (Russian)
- District
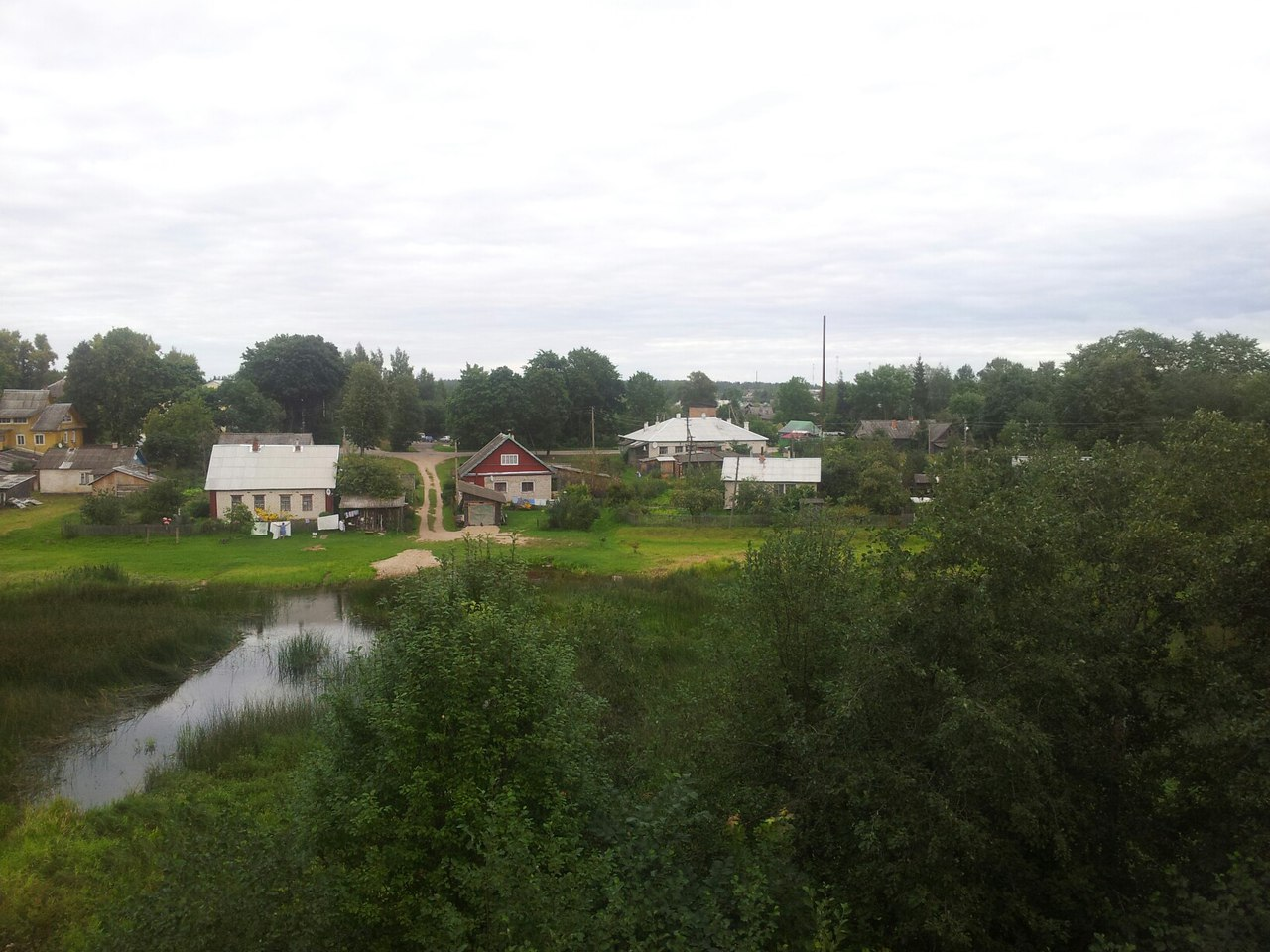
- View of Krasnogorodsk

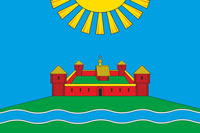
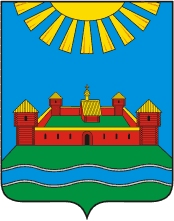
- Flag Coat of arms
- Location of Krasnogorodsky District in Pskov Oblast
- Coordinates: 56°49′44″N 28°16′51″E
- Country: Russia
- Federal subject: Pskov Oblast
- Established: 1927
- Administrative center: Krasnogorodsk

Area
  - Total: 1,320.42 km^{2} (509.82 sq mi)

Population (2010 Census)
  - Total: 7,328
  - Density: 5.550/km^{2} (14.37/sq mi)
  - Urban: 52.8%
  - Rural: 47.2%

Administrative structure
  - Inhabited localities: 1 urban-type settlements, 220 rural localities

Municipal structure
  - Municipally incorporated as: Krasnogorodsky Municipal District
  - Municipal divisions: 1 urban settlements, 3 rural settlements
- Time zone: UTC+3 (MSK)
- OKTMO ID: 58614000
- Website: http://krasnogorodsk.reg60.ru/

Krasnogorodsky District (Russian: Красногоро́дский райо́н) is an administrative and municipal district (raion), one of the twenty-four in Pskov Oblast, Russia. It is located in the west of the oblast and borders with Ostrovsky District in the north, Pushkinogorsky District in the northeast, Opochetsky District in the southeast, Sebezhsky District in the south, Cibla and Kārsava municipalities of Latvia in the southwest, and with Pytalovsky District in the west. The area of the district is 1,320.42 square kilometers (509.82 sq mi). Its administrative center is the urban locality (a work settlement) of Krasnogorodsk. Population: 7,328 (2010 census); 9,800 (2002 Census); 11,886 (1989 Soviet census). The population of Krasnogorodsk accounts for 52.8% of the district's total population.

== Geography ==
The district lies in the basin of the Velikaya River and thus of the Narva River. The most significant rivers in the district are the Sinyaya and the Lzha, both originating in Latvia. The Sinyaya, a tributary of the Velikaya, crosses the district from south to north. In particular, the settlement of Krasnogorodsk is located on the banks of the Sinyaya. The Lzha, a tributary of the Utroya, forms a stretch of the state border between Russia and Latvia and proceeds to form the border between Krasnogorodsky and Pytalovsky Districts. A number of lakes are located in the district. The biggest ones are Lakes Velye (shared with Ostrovsky District), Pitel (shared with Latvia), and Vysokoye.

Over half of the district's territory is occupied by forests.

== History ==
In the medieval times, the area belonged to Pskov. Krasnogorodsk was founded in 1464 as Krasny Gorodets and was a fortress protecting Pskov from the southwest—one of the directions the Livonian Order was likely to advance from. In the beginning of the 15th century, together with Pskov, the area was annexed by the Grand Duchy of Moscow. In 1581, Krasny Gorodets was conquered by the Polish Army and burned down. In 1607, it was again conquered by Lithuanians. In 1634, peace between Russia and Poland was concluded, and the area was transferred to the Polish–Lithuanian Commonwealth. It was returned to Russia under one of the provisions of the Truce of Andrusovo in 1667.

In the course of the administrative reform carried out in 1708 by Peter the Great, the area was included into Ingermanland Governorate (known since 1710 as Saint Petersburg Governorate). In 1727, separate Novgorod Governorate was split off, and in 1772, Pskov Governorate (which between 1777 and 1796 existed as Pskov Viceroyalty) was established. The area was a part of Opochetsky Uyezd of Pskov Governorate.

On August 1, 1927, the uyezds were abolished, and Krasnogorodsky District was established, with the administrative center in the settlement of Krasnogorodskoye (currently Krasnogorodsk). It included parts of former Opochetsky Uyezd. The governorates were abolished as well, and the district became a part of Pskov Okrug of Leningrad Oblast. On July 23, 1930, the okrugs were also abolished, and the districts were directly subordinated to the oblast. On January 1, 1932, the district was abolished and split between Pushkinsky, Ostrovsky, and Opochetsky Districts. On March 5, 1935, the district was re-established from parts of the territories of Pushkinsky and Opochetsky Districts. Between May 11, 1935 and February 5, 1941, Krasnogorodsky District was a part of Opochka Okrug of Leningrad Oblast, one of the okrugs abutting the state boundaries of the Soviet Union. Between 1941 and 1944, the district was occupied by German troops. On August 22, 1944, the district was transferred to newly established Velikiye Luki Oblast. On October 2, 1957, the oblast was abolished and Krasnogorodsky District was transferred to Pskov Oblast. On February 1, 1963, the district was abolished and merged into Opochetsky District; on December 30, 1966 it was re-established. In 1967, Krasnogorodskoye was granted urban-type settlement status, and in 1995 it was renamed Krasnogorodsk.

== Restricted access ==
The part of the district along the state border is included into a border security zone, intended to protect the borders of Russia from unwanted activity. In order to visit the zone, a permit issued by the local Federal Security Service department is required.

== Economy ==
=== Industry ===
The industry in the district is represented by food and textile production.

=== Transportation ===
Krasnogorodsk is connected by roads with Opochka and with Kārsava in Latvia, and has access to the European route E262, running from Ostrov to Kaunas via Rēzekne and Daugavpils. The stretch between Ostrov and Latvian border has been a toll road since 2002. There are also local roads.

== Culture and recreation ==
The district contains one cultural heritage monument of federal significance and additionally thirty objects classified as cultural and historical heritage of local significance. The federally protected monument is an archeological site.
