= Proshki =

Village in Vitebsk Region, Belarus

Proshki Прошкі (Belarusian) Прошки (Russian)
- Village
- Location within Belarus
- Coordinates: 56°8′15″N 28°8′40″E
- Country: Belarus
- Region: Vitebsk Region
- District: Vyerkhnyadzvinsk District
- Time zone: UTC+3 (MSK)
- Area code: +375 2151

Proshki (Belarusian: Прошкі, romanized: Proški; Russian: Прошки) is a village in Vyerkhnyadzvinsk District, Vitebsk Region, Belarus. Since 2013, it has been part of Asvyeya selsoviet. The village is the northernmost settlement in the country.

== See also ==
- List of countries by northernmost point
