= Sebezhsky National Park =

National park in the Pskov region

- IUCN category II (national park)
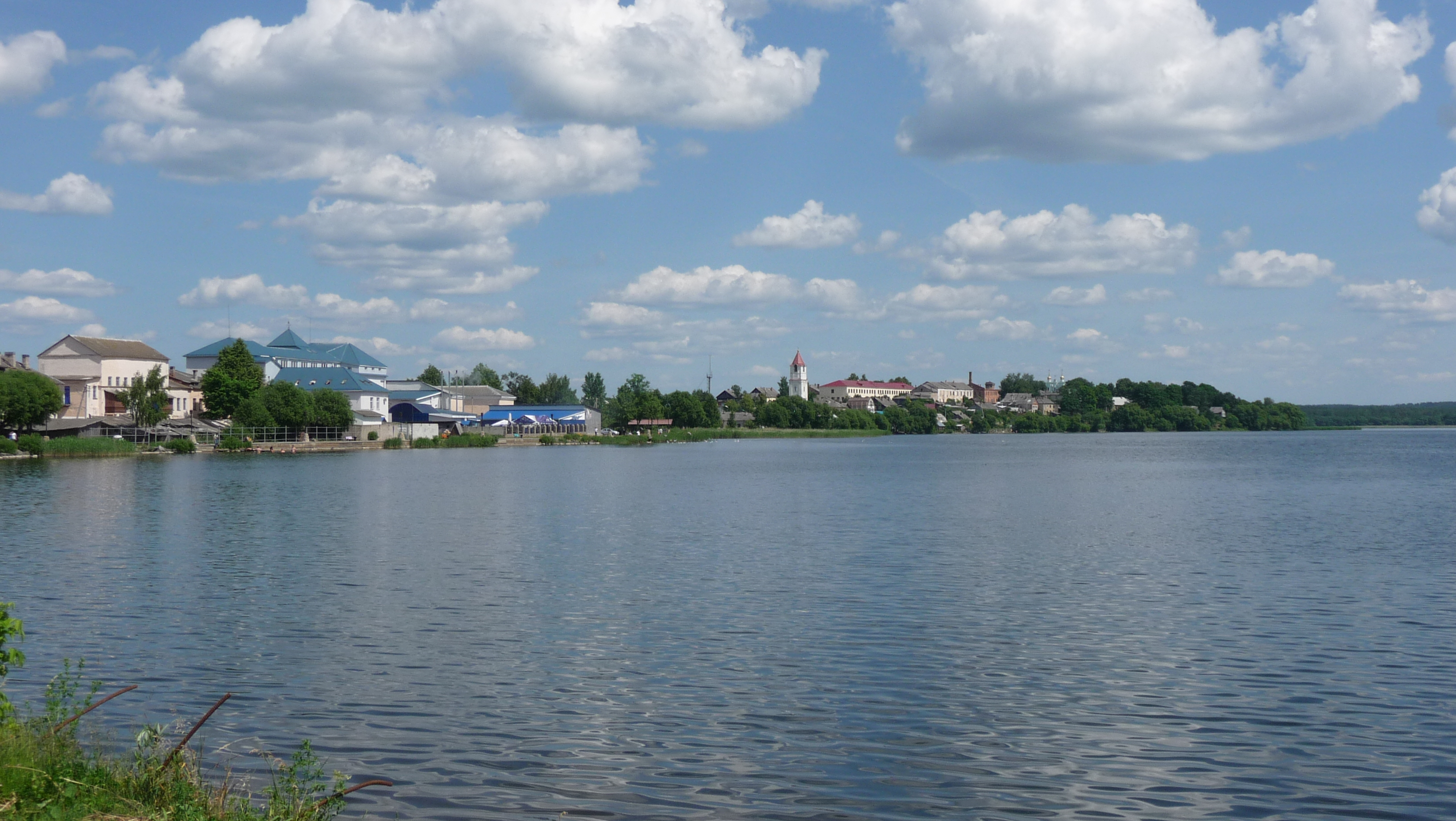
- Lake Sebezhskoye and the town of Sebezh

- Location within Russia
- Location: Russia
- Nearest city: Sebezh
- Coordinates: 56°16′N 28°30′E
- Area: 500.21 square kilometres (193.13 mi^{2})
- Established: 1996
- Governing body: Department of Forestry of Pskov Oblast

Sebezhsky National Park (Russian: Себежский национальный парк) is a national park in the northwest of Russia, located in Sebezhsky District of Pskov Oblast. It was established on January 8, 1996. The national park was created to protect the landscapes of the lake district in the southwest of Pskov Oblast.

The park covers 500.21 square kilometres (193.13 mi^{2}).

== Geography ==
The southwestern part of Sebezhsky District, where the national park is located, is essentially hilly landscape of glacial origin with many lakes. The area is forested, with pine, spruce, mixed, and alder forests. The park occupies the southwestern corner of the district and borders with Latvia and Belarus. The center of the town of Sebezh lies immediately north of the park, and the southern part of the town is located in the park. Most of the area of the park belongs to the river basin of the Velikaya, and some areas in the south belong to the basin of the Daugava. The largest lakes within the park are Lake Necheritsa, Lake Sebezhskoye, and Lake Orono.

== History ==
The area was populated since antiquity. In the medieval times, it was subordinated to the city of Pskov. People initially settled at lakeshores, and eventually also populated spaces between the lakes. Since the 15th century, the area was disputed between the Grand Duchy of Moscow and Grand Duchy of Lithuania, finally moving to Russia in 1772, during the First Partition of Poland. Already by the 15th century the lands were extensively used for agriculture. In the end of the 17th century, the agriculture was in crisis, partially related to the Livonian War, and partially to the old methods used; it was slowly recovering from the 17th century. In the 19th century, timber production considerably reduced forested areas; fishery on the lakes was common. In the 1950s, many swamps were drained and converted into agricultural lands. In the beginning of the 1990s, the agriculture was again in deep crisis, and it was decided to convert the area in the national park, protecting cultural and natural landscapes.

== Fauna ==
The park contains 291 species of vertebrates, including two species of lamprey, thirty species of fish, eight species of amphibians, five species of reptiles, 202 species of birds, and 49 species of mammals. Big mammals include brown bear, lynx, gray wolf, wild boar, moose, and roe deer.

== Tourism and infrastructure ==
In the park, there are a number of huts. Recreational hunting and fishery are permitted.

The part of the park along the state border with Latvia is included into a border security zone, intended to protect the borders of the Russian Federation from unwanted activity. In order to visit the zone, a permit issued by the local Federal Security Service department is required.
