= Ludza (river) =

River in Latvia and Russia

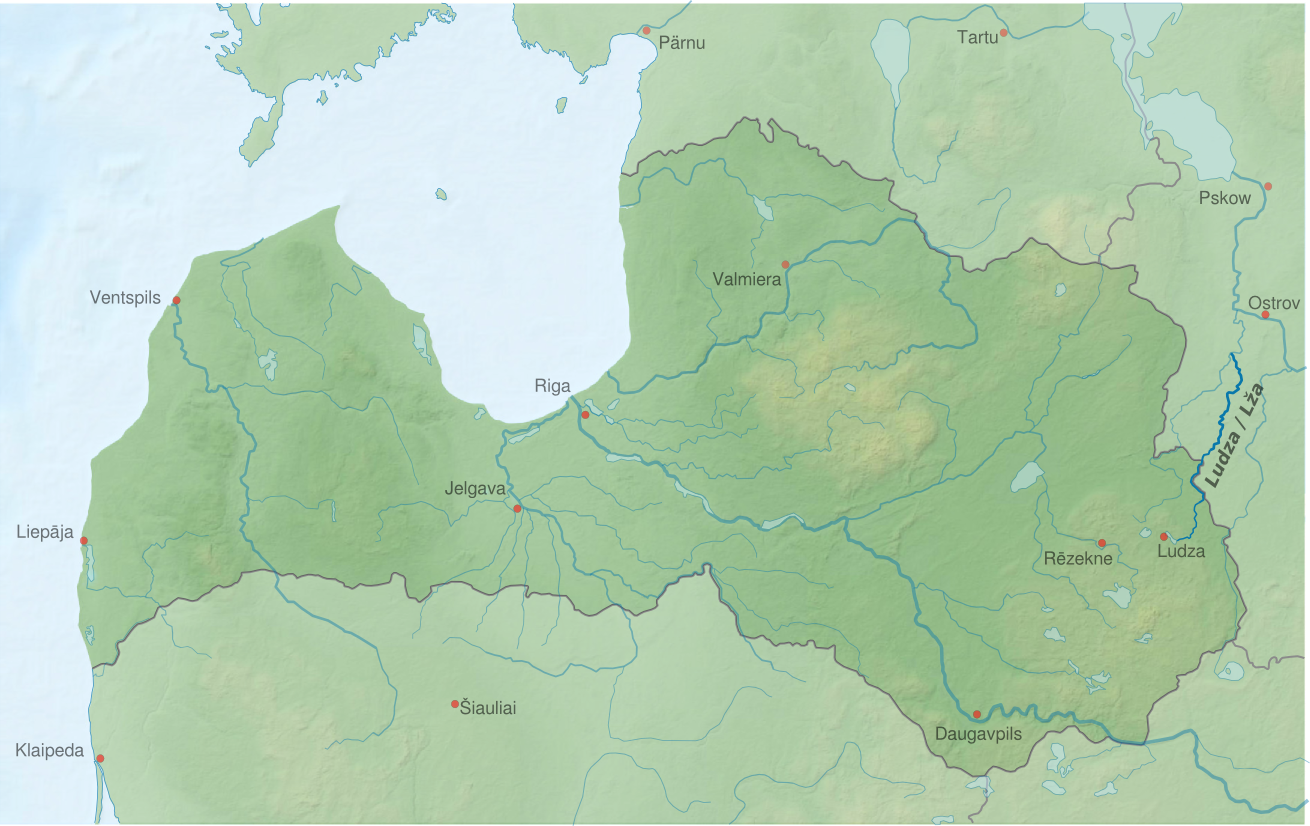

Location
- Country: Latvia, Russia

Physical characteristics
- Source: Greater Ludza Lake
  - coordinates: 56°31′47″N 27°48′14″E
- Mouth: Utroya
  - coordinates: 57°12′51″N 28°8′19″E
- Length: 156 km (97 mi)
- Basin size: 1,540 km^{2} (590 sq mi)
- Discharge
  - average: 0.26 km^{2} (0.10 sq mi)

Basin features
- Progression: Utroya→ Velikaya→ Lake Peipus→ Narva→ Gulf of Finland

The Ludza (Latvian: Ludza, Russian: Лжа, Lzha) is a 156 kilometres (97 mi) long river in Ludza, Cibla, and Kārsava municipalities of Latvia and in Krasnogorodsky and Pytalovsky Districts of Pskov Oblast of Russia. It is a right tributary of the Utroya.

The source of the Ludza is Greater Ludza Lake near the town of Ludza, Latvia. The river flows east, turns north and a part of it forms part of the Latvia–Russia border. Further north, it turns northeast and departs to the Russian side, forming the border between Krasnogorosdky and Pytalovsky Districts of Pskov Oblast. In Russia, the Ludza is known as the Lzha. Even further north, the Lzha turns north and joins the Utroya close to the village of Khudyaki.
