= Dzyornavichy, Vitebsk region =

Dzyornavichy Дзёрнавічы (Belarusian)
- Location in Belarus
- Coordinates: 55°43′4″N 28°26′23″E
- Country: Belarus
- Region: Vitebsk Region
- District: Vyerkhnyadzvinsk District

Area
  - Total: 0.53 sq mi (1.38 km^{2})
  - Land: 0.53 sq mi (1.38 km^{2})
- Elevation: 410 ft (125 m)

Population (2012)
  - Total: 313
  - Density: 260/sq mi (101/km^{2})
- Time zone: UTC+3 (MSK)
- Postal code: 211631
- Area code: +375

Dzyornavichy (Note: BGN/PCGN romanization of Belarusian.) or Dernovichi (Belarusian: Дзёрнавічы, romanized: Dziornavičy; (Note: Official transliteration.) Russian: Дерновичи) is a village in Vyerkhnyadzvinsk District, Vitebsk Region, Belarus. It is located near the village of Iskra.
