= Krasnogorodsk =

Krasnogorodsk Красногородск
- Work settlement
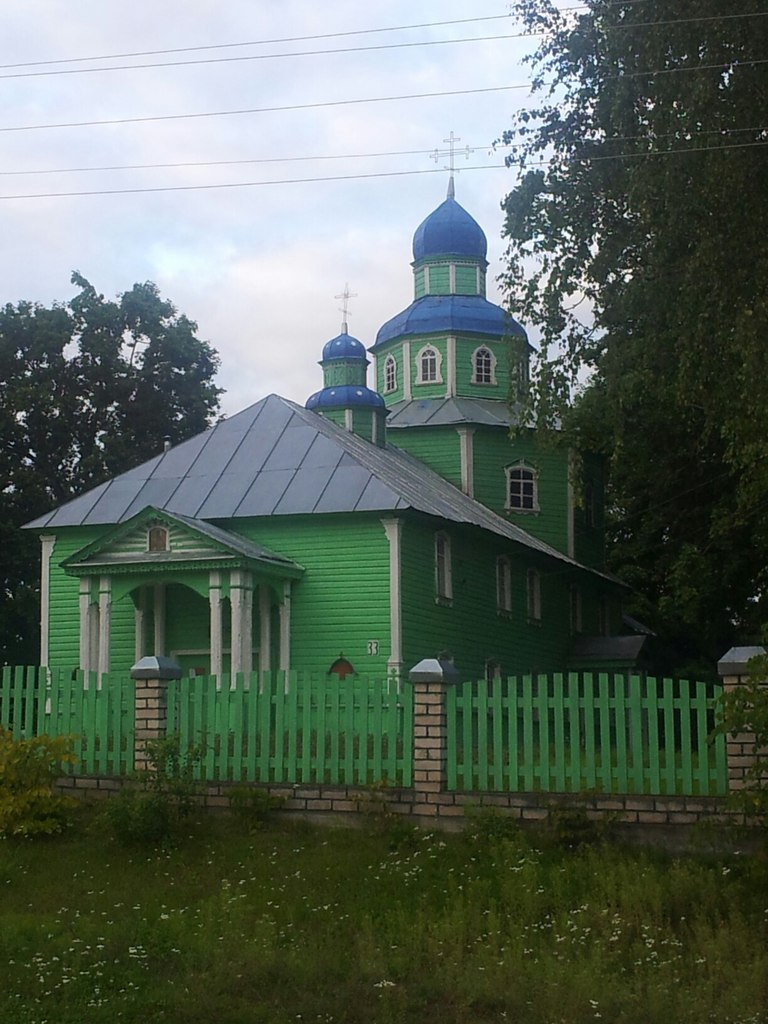
- The St. Nicholas Church

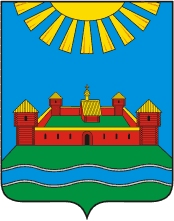
- Coat of arms
- Interactive map of Krasnogorodsk
- Location of Krasnogorodsk Krasnogorodsk (Pskov Oblast)
- Coordinates: 56°49′44″N 28°16′51″E
- Country: Russia
- Federal subject: Pskov Oblast
- Administrative district: Krasnogorodsky District
- settlement: 1464
- Urban-type settlement status since: 1967

Population (2010 Census)
  - Total: 3,870
  - Estimate (2021): 3,521 (−9%)

Administrative status
  - Capital of: Krasnogorodsky District

Municipal status
  - Municipal district: Krasnogorodsky Municipal District
  - Urban settlement: Krasnogorodsk Urban Settlement
  - Capital of: Krasnogorodsky Municipal District, Krasnogorodsk Urban Settlement
- Time zone: UTC+3 (MSK)
- Postal code: 182370
- OKTMO ID: 58614151051

Krasnogorodsk (Russian: Красногородск; Estonian: Kraasna) is an urban locality (a work settlement) and the administrative center of Krasnogorodsky District of Pskov Oblast, Russia, located on the Sinyaya River south of Pskov. Municipally, it is incorporated as Krasnogorodsk Urban Settlement, the only urban settlement in the district. Population: 3,870 (2010 census); 4,694 (2002 census); 5,295 (1989 Soviet census).

== History ==
Krasnogorodsk was founded in 1464 as Krasny Gorodets and was a fortress protecting Pskov from the southwest - one of the directions the Livonian Order was likely to advance from. In the beginning of the 15th century, together with Pskov, it was transferred to the Grand Duchy of Moscow. In 1581, Krasny Gorodets was conquered by the Polish Army and burned down. In 1607, it was again conquered by Lithuanians. In 1634 a peace between Russia and Poland was concluded, and the Krasny Gorodets was transferred to the Polish–Lithuanian Commonwealth. It was returned to Russia under one of the provisions of the Truce of Andrusovo in 1667. By the end of the 19th century, the name of the settlement was Krasnogorodskoye and it was a part of Opochetsky Uyezd of Pskov Governorate.

On August 1, 1927, the uyezds were abolished, and Krasnogorodsky District was established, with the administrative center in Krasnogorodskoye. The governorates were abolished as well, and the district became a part of Pskov Okrug of Leningrad Oblast. On July 23, 1930, the okrugs were also abolished, and the districts were directly subordinated to the oblast. On January 1, 1932 the district was abolished and split between Pushkinsky, Ostrovsky, and Opochetsky Districts. On March 5, 1935 the district was re-established on the areas belonging to Pushkinsky and Opochetsky Districts. Between May 11, 1935 and February 5, 1941, Krasnogorodsky District was a part of Opochka Okrug of Leningrad Oblast, one of the okrugs abutting the state boundaries of the Soviet Union. Between 1941 and 1944, the district was occupied by German troops. On August 22, 1944, the district was transferred to newly established Velikiye Luki Oblast. On October 2, 1957, the oblast was abolished, and Krasnogorodsky District was transferred into Pskov Oblast. On February 1, 1963, the district was abolished and merged into Opochetsky District; on December 30, 1966, it was re-established. On April 26, 1967, Krasnogorodskoye was granted urban-type settlement status, and on January 26, 1995, it was renamed Krasnogorodsk.

== Economy ==
=== Industry ===
The industry in Krasnogorodsk is represented by food and textile production.

=== Transportation ===
Krasnogorodsk is connected by roads with Opochka and with Kārsava in Latvia, and has access to the European route E262, running from Ostrov to Kaunas via Rēzekne and Daugavpils. There are also local roads.

== Culture and recreation ==
Krasnogorodsk contains one cultural heritage monument classified as cultural and historical heritage of local significance. The monument, which is the site of the former Krasny Gorodets fortress, in protected at the federal level.
