= Museum reserve =

Museum type

In Russia and former Soviet Union, a museum reserve, museum preserve or museum zapovednik (Russian: музей-заповедник) is an official type of open-air museums, which, in addition to the items of exhibition, includes a territory with architectural, historical, and natural monuments, and other places of interest which have a protected status of zapovednik (preserve). The term "museum zapovednik" as an official status was introduced in the Soviet Union in 1958–1959. Their official status in post-Soviet Russia was put in law in 2011.

A similar concept exists in some other post-Soviet states.

For the first time the term "zapovednik" was used in the name "Государственный заповедник 'Пушкинский уголок'", established in 1922, now Mikhaylovskoye Museum Reserve.

== See also ==
- List of museum preserves in Russia
- ru:Категория:Музеи-заповедники России
