= Vyerkhnyadzvinsk =

Vyerkhnyadzvinsk Верхнядзвінск (Belarusian) Верхнедвинск (Russian)
- Town
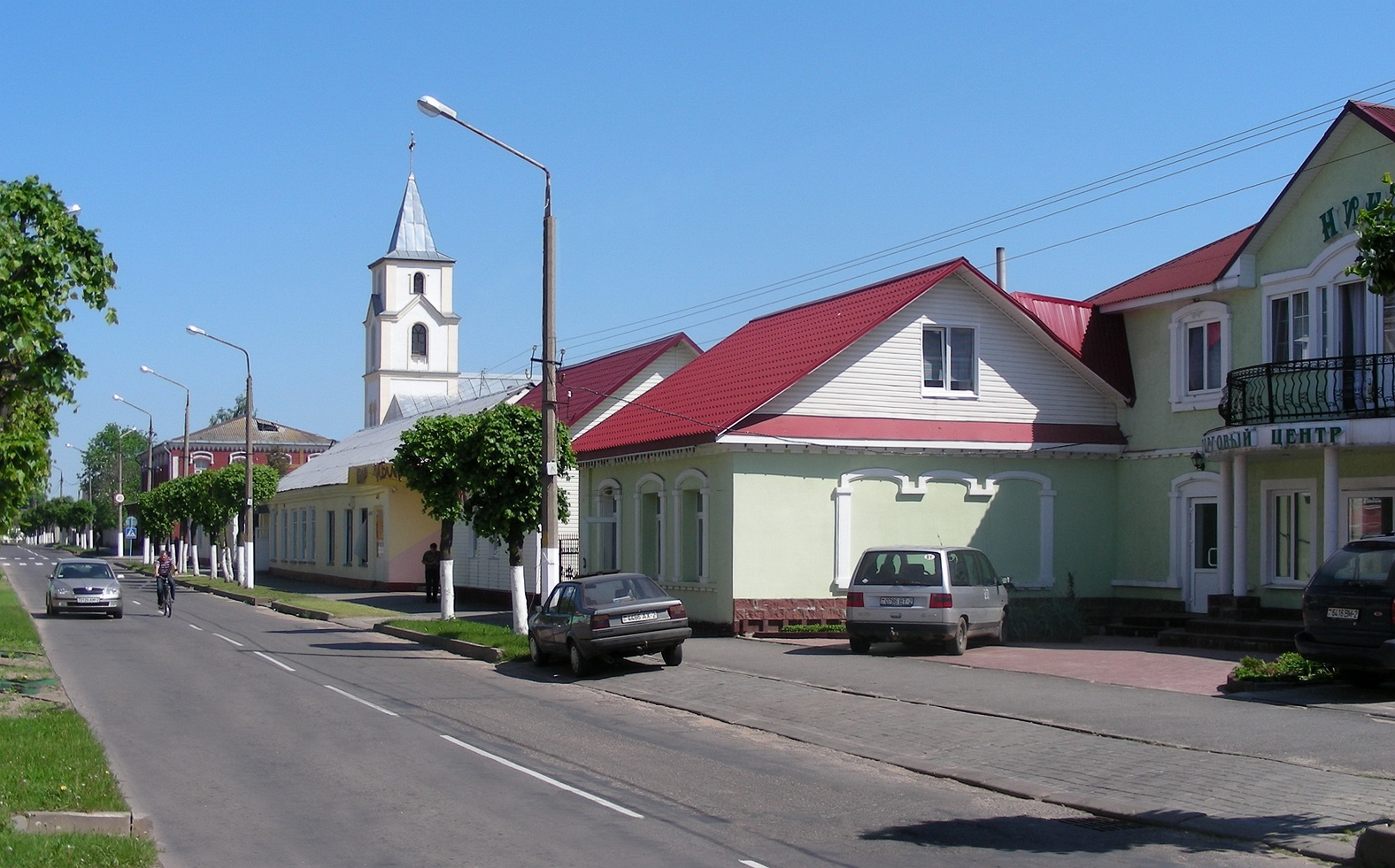

- Flag Coat of arms

- Location within Belarus
- Coordinates: 55°47′N 27°57′E
- Country: Belarus
- Region: Vitebsk Region
- District: Vyerkhnyadzvinsk District
- First mentioned: 1386
- Administrative center: 1924

Population (2025)
  - Total: 6,771
- Postal code: 211631
- Area code: +375 2151
- License plate: 2

Vyerkhnyadzvinsk or Verkhnedvinsk (Belarusian: Верхнядзвінск, romanized: Vierchniadzvinsk; (Note: Official transliteration.) Russian: Верхнедвинск), previously known as Drysa or Drissa (Note: Belarusian: Дрыса; Russian: Дрисса) until 1962, is a town in Vitebsk Region, in northern Belarus. It serves as the administrative center of Vyerkhnyadzvinsk District. It is located at the confluence of the Drysa River and the Daugava River. Its population in 2009 was 7,600. As of 2025, it has a population of 6,771.

== History ==
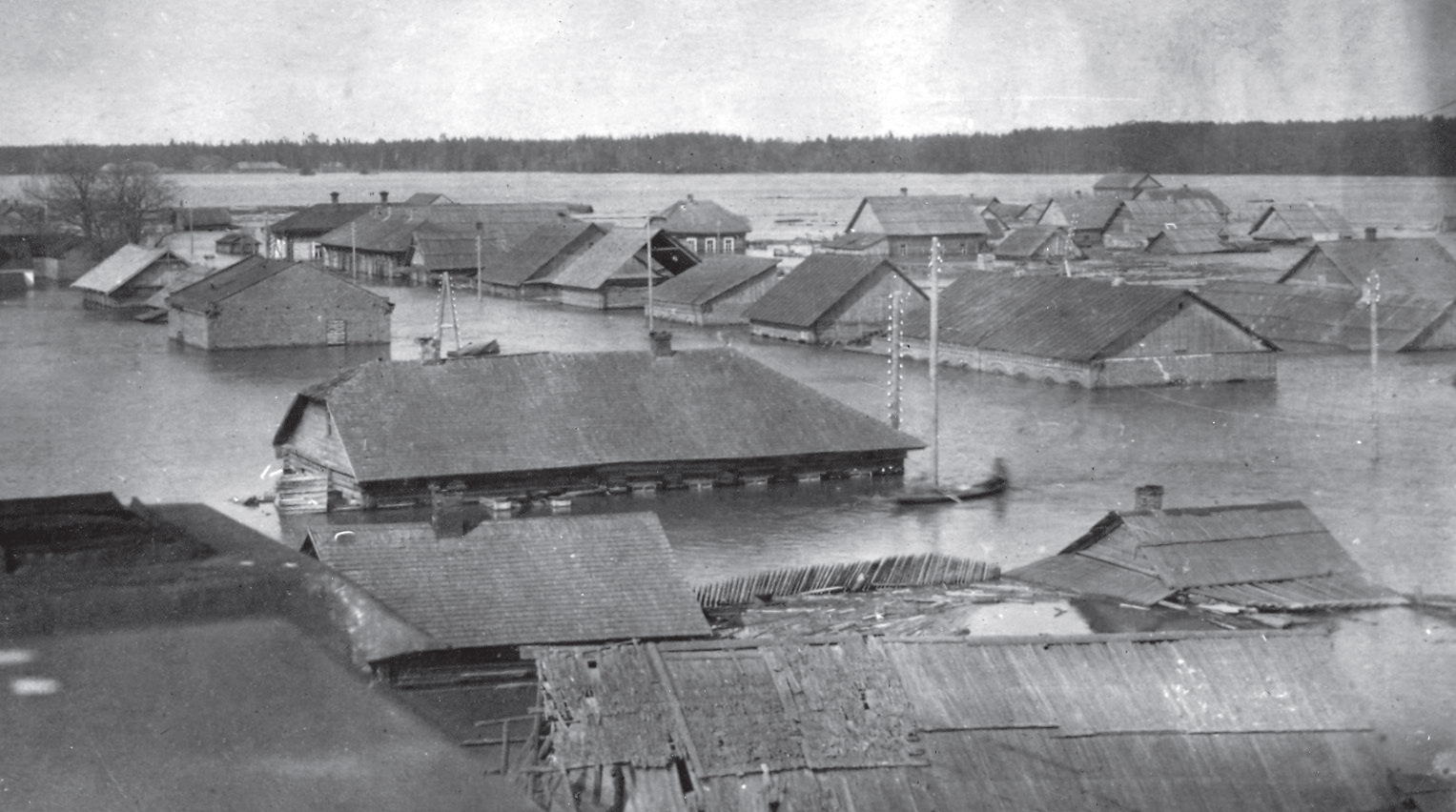
Flood in 1929

Drissa is first mentioned in a chronicle of the year 1386. During the medieval period it formed part of the Principality of Polotsk, the Grand Duchy of Lithuania, and the Polish–Lithuanian Commonwealth. From 1801 it was the center of the Drissa uyezd of the Vitebsk Governorate, and during the War of 1812 it was the site of a fortified camp described by Leo Tolstoy in Book Three of War and Peace.

It became a raion center in 1924. During the Second World War, it was occupied by Germany and most of the local population was massacred.

== Climate ==
Climate data for Vyerkhnyadzvinsk (1991–2020)
Month	Jan	Feb	Mar	Apr	May	Jun	Jul	Aug	Sep	Oct	Nov	Dec	Year
Record high °C (°F)	4.2 (39.6)	4.7 (40.5)	11.2 (52.2)	21.8 (71.2)	26.0 (78.8)	28.1 (82.6)	29.9 (85.8)	29.1 (84.4)	24.4 (75.9)	17.4 (63.3)	10.2 (50.4)	5.6 (42.1)	29.9 (85.8)
Mean daily maximum °C (°F)	−2.1 (28.2)	−1.5 (29.3)	3.8 (38.8)	12.0 (53.6)	18.2 (64.8)	21.5 (70.7)	23.6 (74.5)	22.4 (72.3)	16.9 (62.4)	9.7 (49.5)	3.2 (37.8)	−0.6 (30.9)	10.6 (51.1)
Daily mean °C (°F)	−4.5 (23.9)	−4.5 (23.9)	−0.1 (31.8)	6.8 (44.2)	12.5 (54.5)	16.1 (61.0)	18.3 (64.9)	17.0 (62.6)	12.0 (53.6)	6.2 (43.2)	1.1 (34.0)	−2.6 (27.3)	6.5 (43.7)
Mean daily minimum °C (°F)	−7.1 (19.2)	−7.4 (18.7)	−3.7 (25.3)	2.0 (35.6)	7.0 (44.6)	10.9 (51.6)	13.1 (55.6)	12.0 (53.6)	7.8 (46.0)	3.2 (37.8)	−1.0 (30.2)	−4.8 (23.4)	2.7 (36.9)
Record low °C (°F)	−21.5 (−6.7)	−20.1 (−4.2)	−13.0 (8.6)	−4.5 (23.9)	−0.2 (31.6)	4.8 (40.6)	8.1 (46.6)	6.0 (42.8)	0.9 (33.6)	−4.8 (23.4)	−10.0 (14.0)	−14.7 (5.5)	−21.5 (−6.7)
Average precipitation mm (inches)	43.5 (1.71)	40.1 (1.58)	35.7 (1.41)	36.6 (1.44)	60.8 (2.39)	84.5 (3.33)	78.8 (3.10)	68.5 (2.70)	59.1 (2.33)	57.7 (2.27)	50.3 (1.98)	45.0 (1.77)	660.6 (26.01)
Average precipitation days (≥ 1.0 mm)	11.2	10.0	8.7	7.4	9.4	10.6	10.3	9.1	8.4	10.2	10.2	10.5	116.0
Mean monthly sunshine hours	33.2	62.5	139.8	194.0	276.6	285.4	288.9	255.3	161.8	86.3	29.8	23.2	1,836.8
Source: NOAA
