= Mikhaylovskoye Museum Reserve =

Museum in Pskov Oblast, Russia

Coordinates: 57°03′N 28°56′E

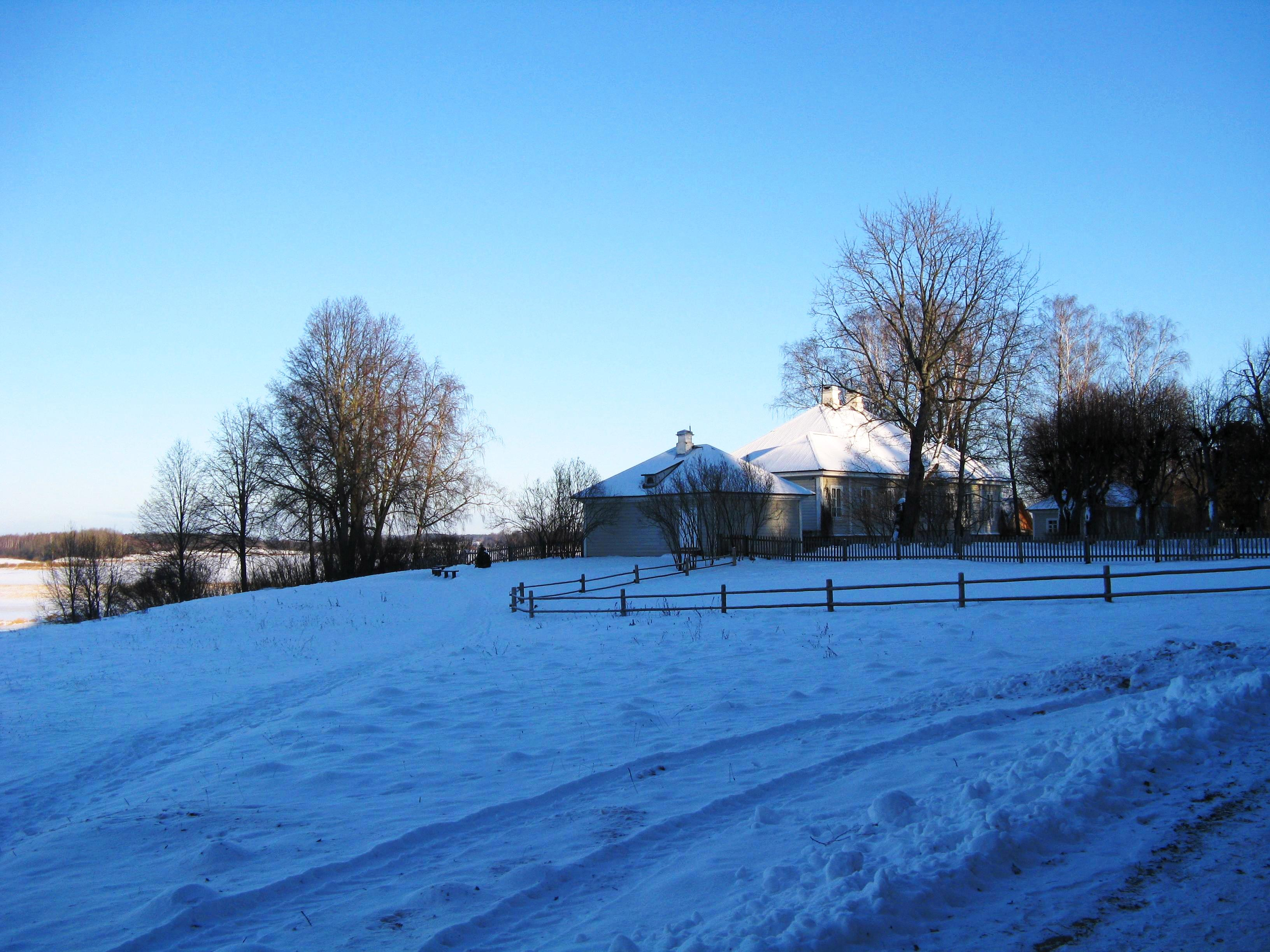
The Pushkin estate in Mikhaylovskoye

Mikhaylovskoye Museum Reserve (Russian: Музей-заповедник Михайловское, officially The State museum-reserve of Alexander Pushkin «Mikhailovskoye») is a museum reserve complex dedicated to Russian poet Alexander Pushkin, the founder of modern Russian literature. The museum is located in Pushkinogorsky District of Pskov Oblast in Northwestern Russia, in the areas around the settlement of Pushkinskiye Gory and in the surrounding villages including Mikhaylovskoye, where Pushkin had a family estate.

== History ==
In 1742, the land around the village of Mikhaylovskoye was granted to Abram Petrovich Gannibal by empress Elizabeth. Pushkin's mother, Nadezhda Osipovna Pushkina (Gannibal), was a granddaughter of Abram Gannibal. Pushkin visited the estate on a regular basis, and was also exiled there between 1824 and 1826. He was killed in a duel in January 1837 in Saint Petersburg, and buried in Svyatogorsky Monastery in what is now Pushkinskiye Gory. The estate remained in the family until 1899, when the state bought it from the poet's son Grigory Pushkin.

An unsuccessful attempt to open a small-scale museum was made in 1911, and subsequently during the October Revolution in 1917 the estate was burnt down. On March 17, 1922 Mikhaylovskoye, Trigorskoye, and the tomb of Pushkin in Svyatogorsky Monastery were declared a state monument and opened as a museum (the Pushkin Museum Reserve). In 1936, the whole Svyatogorsky Monastery was added, as well as the estate of Petrovskoye, which formerly belonged to Pushkin's uncle, and adjacent areas. The museum was looted and badly damaged during World War II; after the war, extensive restoration work was undertaken.

In 1992, the monastery was transferred to the property of Russian Orthodox Church, and in 1995, the museum was expanded, and renamed Mikhaylovskoye Museum Reserve.

== Collections ==
The museum includes several areas,

- Mikhaylovskoye, the former estate by Pushkin, where the main house, several service buildings, and a landscape park were preserved.
- Trigorskoye, the former estate by Praskovya Osipova, a close friend of Pushkin. The main estate house, the bath, and the park were preserved.
- Petrovskoye was granted to Abram Gannibal together with Mikhaylovskoye. In Pushkin's times, it was owned by his mother's cousin, Veniamin Gannibal. The estate with the park was preserved.
- Bugrovo, the village where a water mill was restored.
- The archeological sites of Savkina Gorka, Voronich, and Velye.
