= Utroya =

River in Latvia and Russia

Utroya Russian: Утроя Latvian: Rītupe
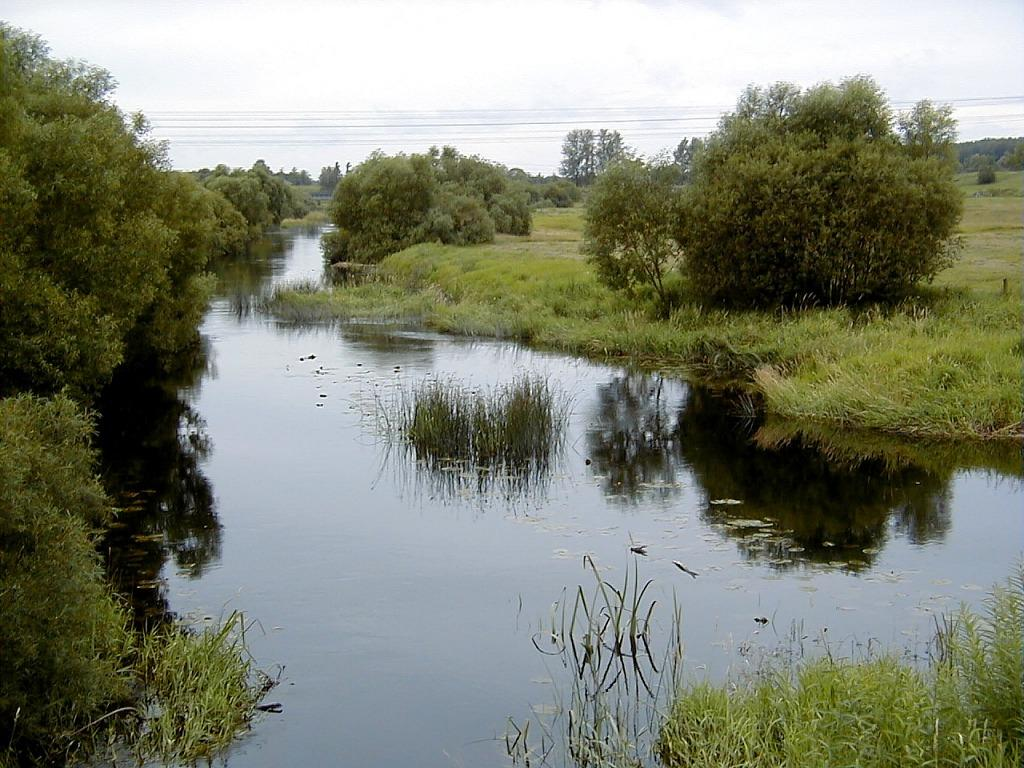

Location
- Country: Latvia, Russia

Physical characteristics
- Source
  - location: Lake Meirāni
- Mouth: Velikaya
  - coordinates: 57°22′27″N 28°11′20″E
  - elevation: 138 m (453 ft)
- Length: 176 km (109 mi)
- Basin size: 3,000 km^{2} (1,200 sq mi)
- Discharge
  - average: 17.2 m^{3}/s (610 cu ft/s)

Basin features
- Progression: Velikaya→ Lake Peipus→ Narva→ Gulf of Finland

The Utroya (Russian: Утроя, in Latvian the Rītupe) is a river of Latvia and Pytalovsky and Ostrovsky Districts of Pskov Oblast of Russia, a left tributary of the Velikaya. It is 176 kilometres (109 mi) long, and the area of its basin 3,000 square kilometres (1,200 sq mi). Its average discharge at 11 km from its mouth is 17.2 m^{3}/s (610 cu ft/s). The principal tributary is the Ludza (Russian: Lzha, right). The towns of Kārsava and Pytalovo are located on the banks of the Rītupe/Utroya.

The source of the Rītupe is Lake Meirānu in the lake district south of the town of Kārsava. The river flows north, passes 2 kilometres (1.2 mi) from the center of Karsava, at a short stretch makes the state border between Latvia and Russia, and crosses into the Russian territory, to Pytalovsky District of Pskov Oblast. The official name of the river in Russia is the Utroya. The river further flows northwest, passes the town of Pytalovo, crosses into Ostrovsky District, accepts the Lzha from the right, and turns north. The mouth of the Utroya is in the village of Larino.

The drainage basin of the Utroya includes areas in the northeastern Latvia, as well as almost whole Pytalovsky District, the western part of Ostrovsky District, as well as minor areas in the western part of Krasnogorodsky District of Pskov Oblast in Russia.
