= Sebezhsky District =

Sebezhsky District Себежский район (Russian)
- District
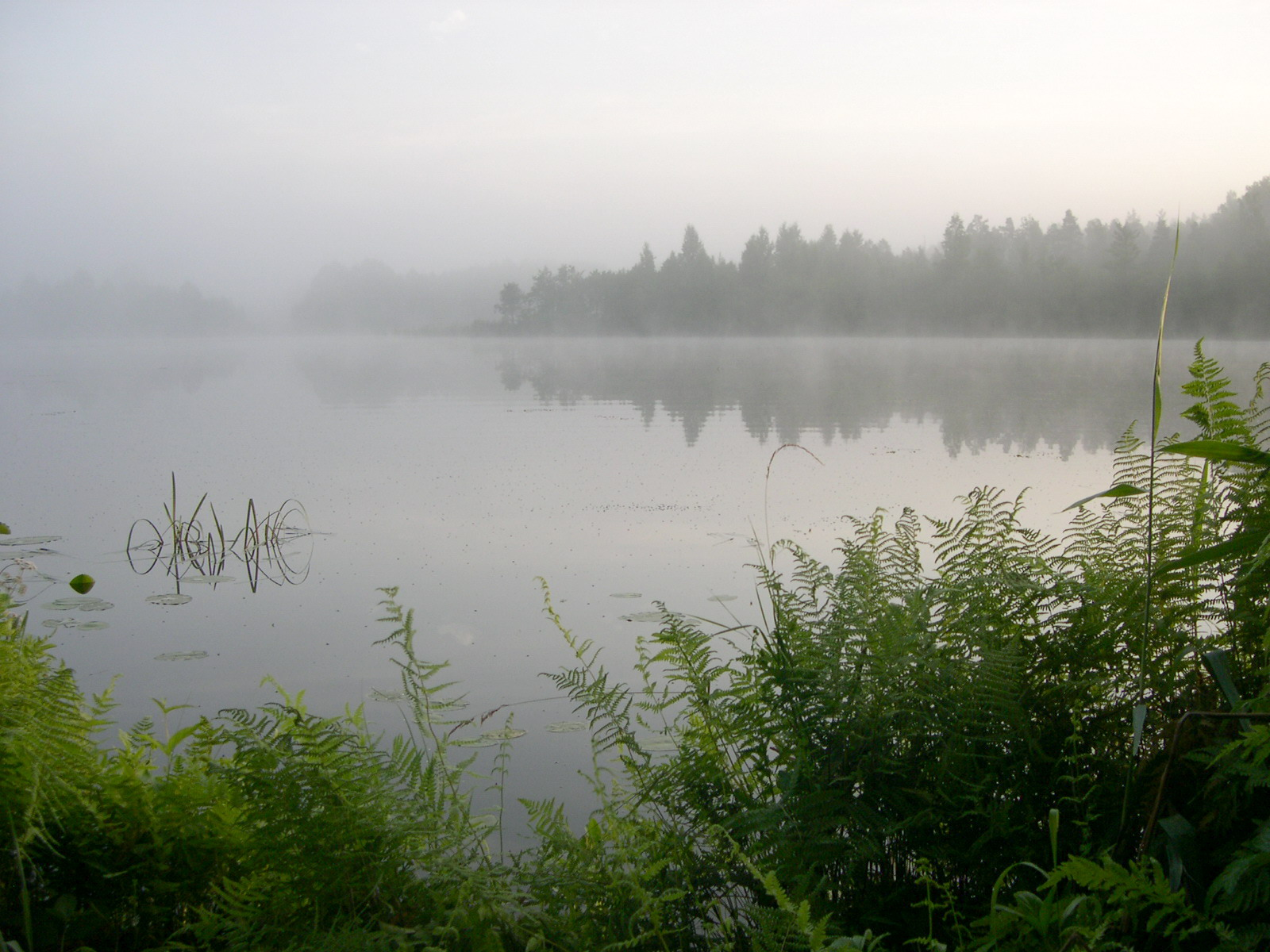

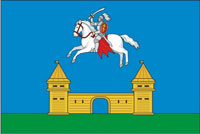
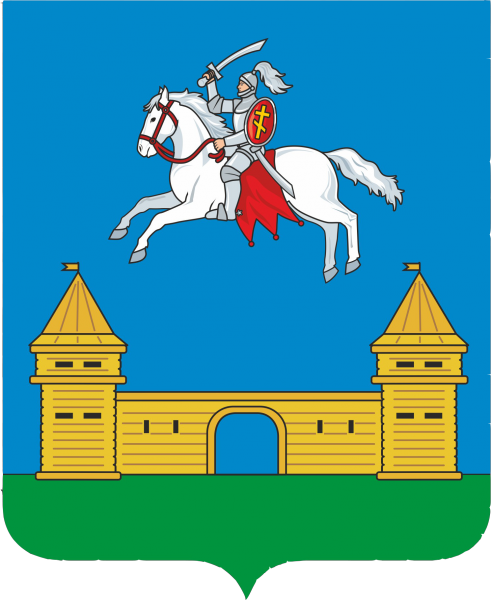
- Flag Coat of arms
- Location of Sebezhsky District in Pskov Oblast
- Coordinates: 56°17′N 28°29′E
- Country: Russia
- Federal subject: Pskov Oblast
- Established: 1 August 1927
- Administrative center: Sebezh

Area
  - Total: 3,100 km^{2} (1,200 sq mi)

Population (2010 Census)
  - Total: 21,674
  - Density: 7.0/km^{2} (18/sq mi)
  - Urban: 65.7%
  - Rural: 34.3%

Administrative structure
  - Inhabited localities: 1 cities/towns, 2 urban-type settlements, 424 rural localities

Municipal structure
  - Municipally incorporated as: Sebezhsky Municipal District
  - Municipal divisions: 3 urban settlements, 6 rural settlements
- Time zone: UTC+3 (MSK)
- OKTMO ID: 58654000
- Website: http://sebezh.reg60.ru/

Sebezhsky District (Russian: Се́бежский райо́н) is an administrative and municipal district (raion), one of the twenty-four in Pskov Oblast, Russia. It is located in the southwest of the oblast and borders Rasony and Verkhnyadzvinsk Districts of Vitebsk Oblast, Belarus to the south; Zilupe, Ludza, and Cibla municipalities of Latvia to the west; Krasnogorodsky and Opochetsky Districts to the north; and Pustoshkinsky and Nevelsky Districts to the east. The area of the district is 3,100 square kilometers (1,200 sq mi). Its administrative center is the town of Sebezh.

As of the 2010 Census, the population of Sebezh was 21,674, down from 25,473 in 2002 and 26,926 in 1989. Sebezh accounts for 29.4% of the district's total population.

== Geography ==
A major part of the district lies within the basin of the Velikaya River, which crosses the northeastern part of the district. The largest tributary of the Velikaya in the district is the Issa (on the left). Rivers in some areas of the southern district drain into Belarus and the Daugava River.

The landscape of the district is a hilly plain of glacial origin. Some of the largest lakes in the district include Sebezhskoye, Orono, Necheritsa, and Sviblo. To protect these lakes and the surrounding landscape, Sebezhsky National Park was established in the southwest of the district.

The district is also known for its production of sand, clay, and peat.

== History ==
Sebezh was first mentioned in 1414 as a fortress protecting Pskov from the south, which was later conquered by Polish troops. It is unclear whether this fortress was identical to the current Sebezh, as it was also reported that a fortress was founded by the Russians in 1535 at the present location of the town. The area was situated on the border between Russia and the Grand Duchy of Lithuania, changing hands several times. In the 18th century, Sebezh was part of Poland until 1772, when, during the First Partition of Poland, the area was transferred to the Russian Empire. To accommodate the newly acquired territories, Pskov Governorate was established in 1772. In 1773, Sebezh was chartered and became the seat of Sebezhsky Uyezd in Polotsk Province of Pskov Governorate. In 1777, it was transferred to Polotsk Viceroyalty. In 1796, the viceroyalty was abolished, and Sebezh became part of Belarus Governorate; in 1802, it was transferred to Vitebsk Governorate. After 1919, Vitebsk Governorate became part of the Russian Soviet Federative Socialist Republic. In 1924, Sebezhsky Uyezd was transferred to Pskov Governorate.

On August 1, 1927, the uyezds were abolished, and Sebezhsky District was established with Sebezh as its administrative centre. The district included parts of the former Sebezhsky Uyezd. The governorates were abolished, and the district became part of Velikiye Luki Okrug within Leningrad Oblast. On June 17, 1929, the district was transferred to Western Oblast. On July 23, 1930, the okrugs were also abolished, and the districts became directly subordinated to the oblast. On January 29, 1935, the district was transferred to Kalinin Oblast, and on February 5 of the same year, Sebezhsky District became part of Velikiye Luki Okrug of Kalinin Oblast, one of the okrugs bordering the Soviet Union. On May 4, 1938, the district was transferred to Opochka Okrug. On February 5, 1941, the okrug was abolished. Between 1941 and 1944, Sebezhsky District was occupied by German troops. On August 22, 1944, the district was transferred to the newly established Velikiye Luki Oblast. On October 2, 1957, Velikiye Luki Oblast was abolished, and Sebezhsky District was transferred to Pskov Oblast.

On August 1, 1927, Idritsky District was also established with the administrative centre in the settlement of Idritsa, including parts of the former Sebezhsky Uyezd. The district was part of Velikiye Luki Okrug of Leningrad Oblast. On June 17, 1929, it was transferred to Western Oblast. On July 23, 1930, the okrugs were abolished, and the districts were directly subordinated to the oblast. On January 1, 1932, Idritsky District was abolished and split between Sebezhsky and Pustoshkinsky Districts. On June 1, 1936, it was re-established as part of Velikiye Luki Okrug in Kalinin Oblast. On May 4, 1938, the district was transferred to Opochka Okrug. On August 22, 1944, it was transferred to Velikiye Luki Oblast. On October 2, 1957, when Velikiye Luki Oblast was abolished, Idritsky District was transferred to Pskov Oblast. On October 3, 1959, Idritsky District was abolished and merged into Sebezhsky District.

== Restricted access ==
The part of the district bordering Latvia is included in a border security zone, designed to protect Russia's borders from unwanted activity. A permit issued by the local Federal Security Service department is required to enter the zone.

== Economy ==
=== Industry ===
In the district, there are enterprises in the electrotechnical (capacitor production), construction, timber, textile, and food industries.

=== Agriculture ===
The primary agricultural specialisations in the district are cattle breeding for meat and milk production, as well as potato and vegetable cultivation.

=== Transportation ===
The M9 Highway, which connects Moscow and Riga, crosses the district from east to west, passing through Sebezh. Another road links Sebezh with Opochka and Polotsk, and the entire stretch between Opochka and Polotsk has been a toll road since 2002. Local roads also serve the area.

The railway connecting Moscow and Riga also traverses the district, with Sebezh serving as the main station.

== Culture and recreation ==
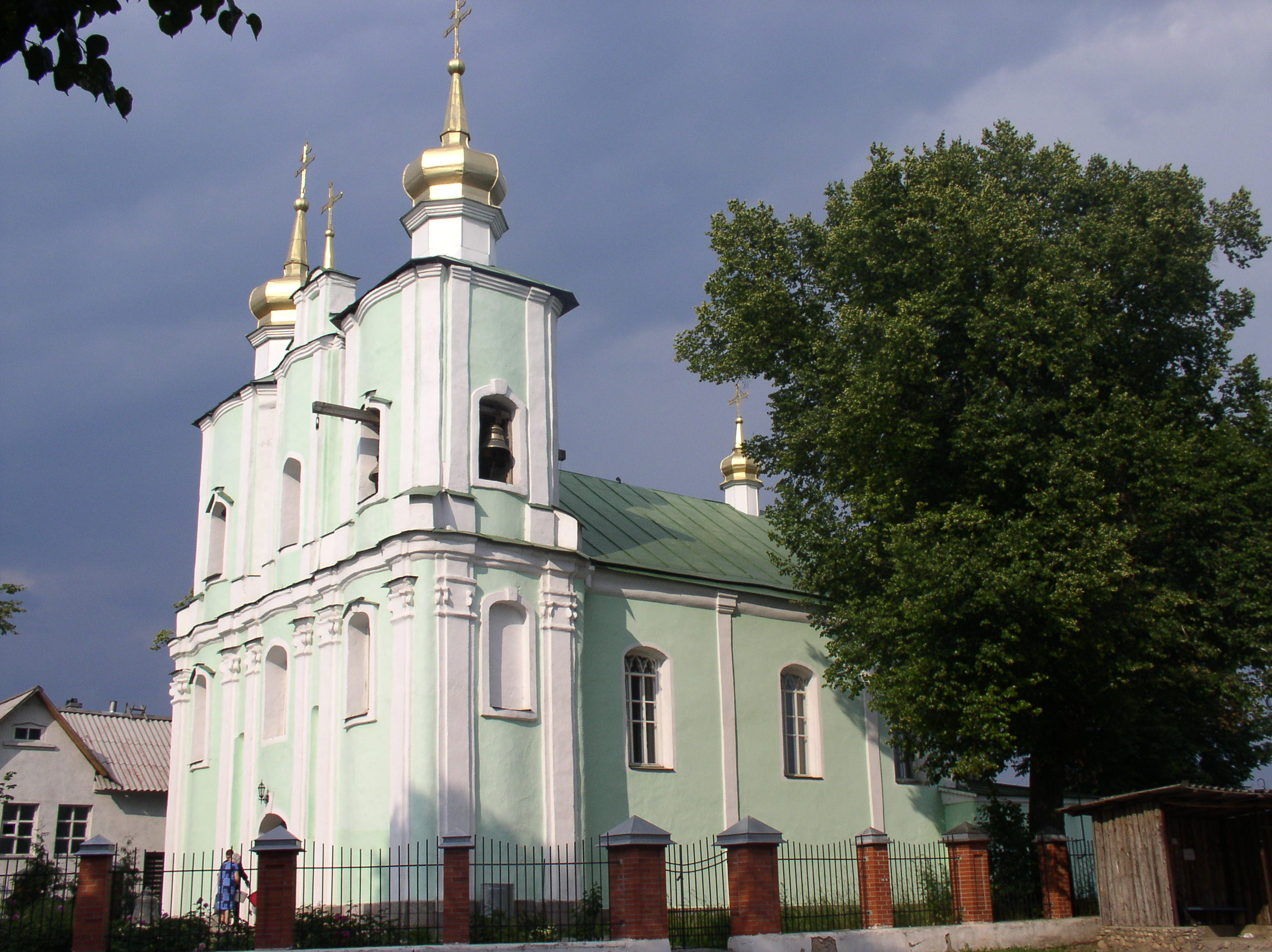
The Trinity Church in Sebezh

The listed buildings in the district include the Trinity Church (formerly a Catholic church) in Sebezh.

Sebezh is home to the Sebezh District Museum, founded in 1927, which displays collections of local interest.
