= Pushkinskiye Gory =

Pushkinskiye Gory Пушкинские Горы
- Work settlement
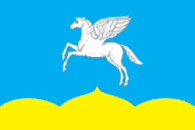
- Flag
- Interactive map of Pushkinskiye Gory
- Location of Pushkinskiye Gory Pushkinskiye Gory (Pskov Oblast)
- Coordinates: 57°01′N 28°55′E
- Country: Russia
- Federal subject: Pskov Oblast
- Administrative district: Pushkinogorsky District
- Urban-type settlement status since: 1960

Population (2010 Census)
  - Total: 5,222
  - Estimate (2021): 4,373 (−16.3%)

Administrative status
  - Capital of: Pushkinogorsky District

Municipal status
  - Municipal district: Pushkinogorsky Municipal District
  - Urban settlement: Pushkinogorye Urban Settlement
  - Capital of: Pushkinogorsky Municipal District, Pushkinogorye Urban Settlement
- Time zone: UTC+3 (MSK)
- Postal code: 181370
- OKTMO ID: 58651152051

Pushkinskiye Gory (Russian: Пушкинские Горы) is an urban locality (a work settlement) and the administrative center of Pushkinogorsky District of Pskov Oblast, Russia. Municipally, it is incorporated as Pushkinogorye Urban Settlement, the only urban settlement in the district. Population: 5,222 (2010 census); 6,089 (2002 census); 7,067 (1989 Soviet census).

== History ==
In 1569, Tsar Ivan the Terrible ordered to found the Svyatogorsky Monastery. The monastery was located close to the fortress of Voronich, which was protecting Pskov from the south and was later destroyed during the Livonian War. The settlement around the monastery was known as Tobolenets. In the course of the administrative reform carried out in 1708 by Peter the Great, the area was included into Ingermanland Governorate (known since 1710 as Saint Petersburg Governorate). In 1727, separate Novgorod Governorate was split off, and in 1772, Pskov Governorate (which between 1777 and 1796 existed as Pskov Viceroyalty) was established. The area was a part of Opochetsky Uyezd of Pskov Governorate. In 1924, the hills around the monastery, which had been known as Sviatye Gory (Holy Mountains), were renamed to Pushkinskiye Gory. In 1925, Tobolenets was renamed Pushkinskiye Gory.

On August 1, 1927, the uyezds were abolished, and Pushkinsky District was established, with the administrative center in the selo of Pushkinskiye Gory. It included parts of former Opochetsky Uyezd. The governorates were abolished as well, and the district became a part of Pskov Okrug of Leningrad Oblast. On July 23, 1930, the okrugs were also abolished, and the districts were directly subordinated to the oblast. On January 1, 1932 parts of abolished Krasnogorodsky District were merged into Pushkinsky District. On January 29, 1935 the district was transferred to Kalinin Oblast, and on February 5 Pushkinsky District became a part of Velikiye Luki Okrug of Kalinin Oblast, one of the okrugs abutting the state boundaries of the Soviet Union. On May 11, 1937 the district was transferred to Opochka Okrug and renamed Pushkinogorsky District. On February 5, 1941 the okrug was abolished. Between July 1941 and July 1944, Pushkinskiye Gory was occupied by German troops. On August 23, 1944, the district was transferred to newly established Pskov Oblast. On February 29, 1960 Pushkinskiye Gory was granted urban-type settlement status.

On February 1, 1963 the district was abolished and split between Novorzhevsky and Opochetsky District as a part of abortive Khrushchev's administrative reform. On December 30, 1966, it was re-established.

== Economy ==
=== Industry ===
In Pushkinskiye Gory, there are enterprises of food and timber industry.

=== Transportation ===
Pushkinskiye Gory is located on the highway between Novgorodka and Novorzhev. In Novgorodka, it has access to the M20 highway which connects St. Petersburg and Vitebsk via Pskov. There are also local roads.

== Culture and recreation ==
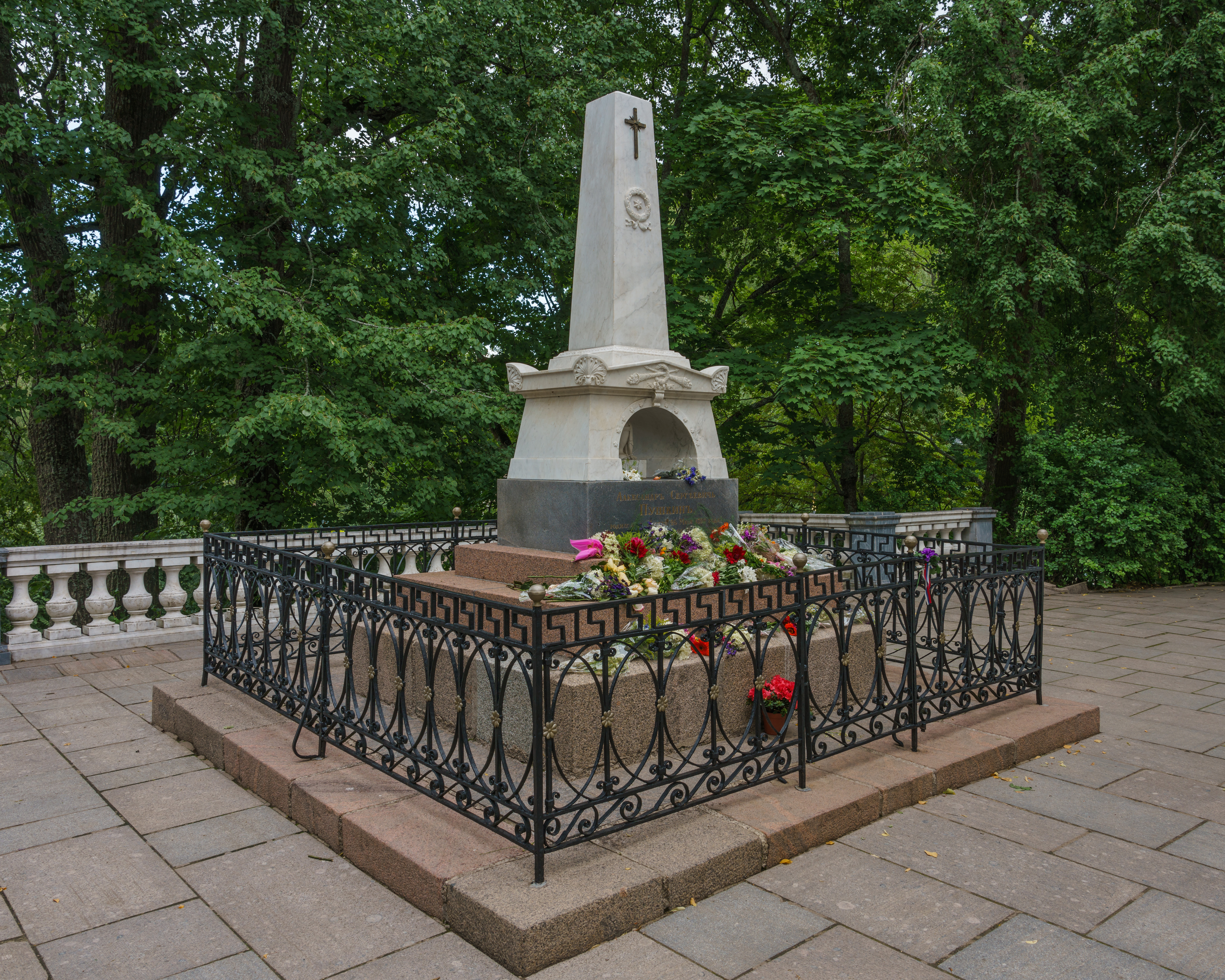
The tomb of Alexander Pushkin

Pushkinskiye Gory contains ten cultural heritage monuments of federal significance and additionally six objects classified as cultural and historical heritage of local significance. The federally protected monuments are grouped in and around the Mikhaylovskoye Museum Reserve, a large museum complex located in Pushkinskiye Gory and the surrounding villages. The complex is devoted to Alexander Pushkin, a Russian 19th century national poet, who owned an estate in the village of Mikhaylovskoye and spent there considerable periods of his life. In particular, the buildings of Svyatogorsky Monastery, with the tomb of Pushkin, are located in Pushkinskiye Gory.

== Climate ==
Climate data for Pushkinskiye Gory
Month	Jan	Feb	Mar	Apr	May	Jun	Jul	Aug	Sep	Oct	Nov	Dec	Year
Record high °C (°F)	10.0 (50.0)	10.6 (51.1)	22.3 (72.1)	26.8 (80.2)	32.5 (90.5)	33.6 (92.5)	34.5 (94.1)	36.3 (97.3)	28.4 (83.1)	23.5 (74.3)	15.2 (59.4)	11.1 (52.0)	36.3 (97.3)
Mean daily maximum °C (°F)	−2.6 (27.3)	−1.9 (28.6)	3.5 (38.3)	11.7 (53.1)	17.9 (64.2)	21.3 (70.3)	23.5 (74.3)	22.0 (71.6)	16.3 (61.3)	9.0 (48.2)	2.7 (36.9)	−1.0 (30.2)	10.2 (50.4)
Daily mean °C (°F)	−4.9 (23.2)	−4.8 (23.4)	−0.3 (31.5)	6.6 (43.9)	12.3 (54.1)	16.0 (60.8)	18.3 (64.9)	16.8 (62.2)	11.7 (53.1)	5.9 (42.6)	0.6 (33.1)	−2.9 (26.8)	6.3 (43.3)
Mean daily minimum °C (°F)	−7.3 (18.9)	−7.6 (18.3)	−3.7 (25.3)	2.1 (35.8)	7.0 (44.6)	11.0 (51.8)	13.5 (56.3)	12.3 (54.1)	7.9 (46.2)	3.2 (37.8)	−1.4 (29.5)	−5.1 (22.8)	2.7 (36.8)
Record low °C (°F)	−35.9 (−32.6)	−31.9 (−25.4)	−30.0 (−22.0)	−16.1 (3.0)	−5.9 (21.4)	0.4 (32.7)	4.1 (39.4)	0.1 (32.2)	−4.5 (23.9)	−11.0 (12.2)	−22.6 (−8.7)	−40.4 (−40.7)	−40.4 (−40.7)
Average precipitation mm (inches)	49.6 (1.95)	40.1 (1.58)	36.6 (1.44)	41.0 (1.61)	61.4 (2.42)	83.0 (3.27)	71.2 (2.80)	80.7 (3.18)	59.6 (2.35)	67.8 (2.67)	56.6 (2.23)	45.6 (1.80)	693.2 (27.3)
Source: Pogodaiklimat.ru
