= Sebezh =

Town in Pskov Oblast, Russia

Sebezh Себеж
- Town
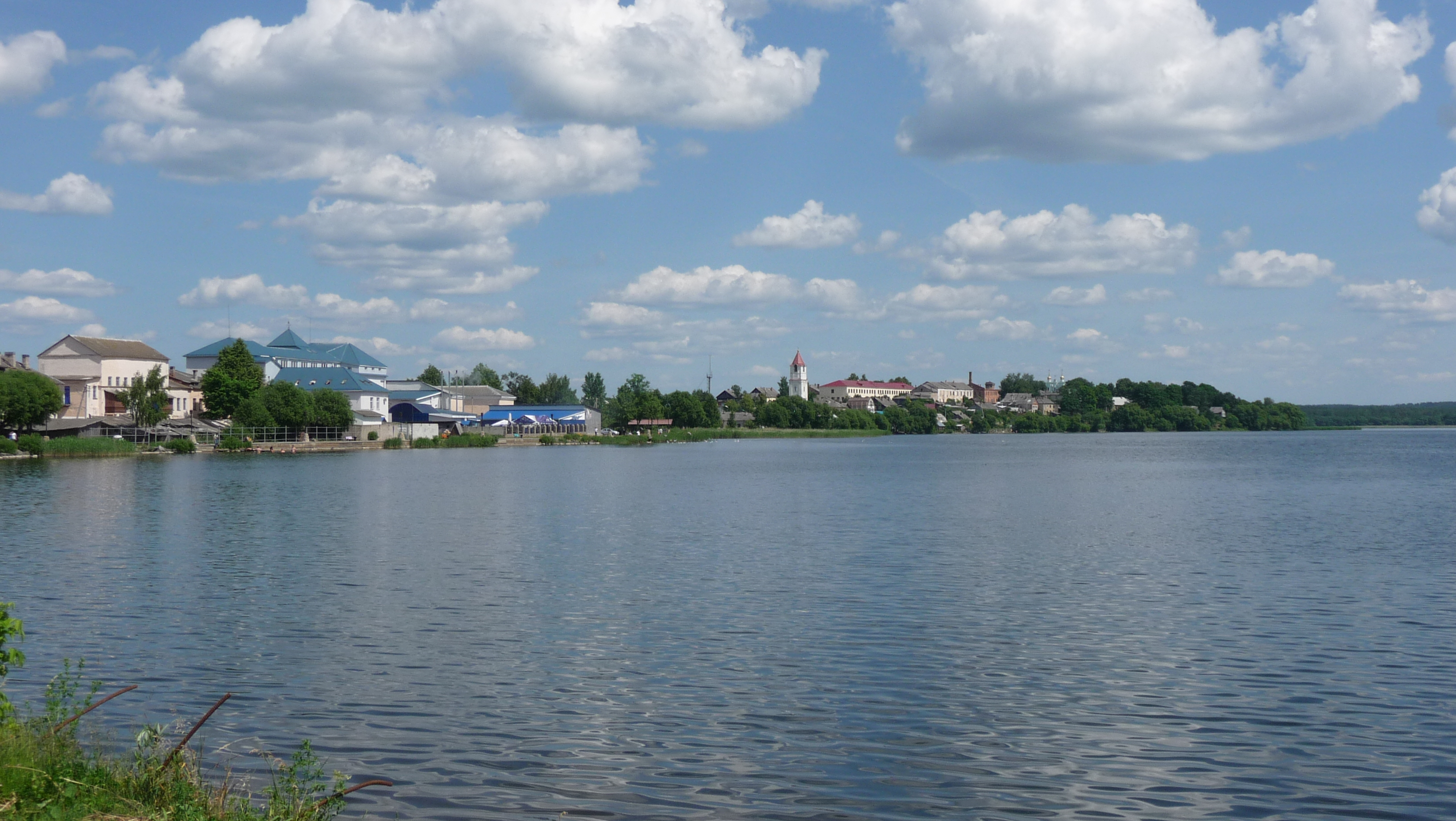
- Panorama of Sebezh

- Coat of arms
- Interactive map of Sebezh
- Location of Sebezh Sebezh (Pskov Oblast)
- Coordinates: 56°16′N 28°29′E
- Country: Russia
- Federal subject: Pskov Oblast
- Administrative district: Sebezhsky District
- First mentioned: 1414
- Town status since: 1772
- Elevation: 130 m (430 ft)

Population (2010 Census)
  - Total: 6,375
  - Estimate (2021): 6,246 (−2%)

Administrative status
  - Capital of: Sebezhsky District

Municipal status
  - Municipal district: Sebezhsky Municipal District
  - Urban settlement: Sebezh Urban Settlement
  - Capital of: Sebezhsky Municipal District, Sebezh Urban Settlement
- Time zone: UTC+3 (MSK)
- Postal codes: 182250, 182251, 182299
- Dialing code: +7 81140
- OKTMO ID: 58654101001

Sebezh (Russian: Се́беж) is a town and the administrative center of Sebezhsky District in Pskov Oblast, Russia, located in a picturesque setting between Lakes Sebezhskoye and Orono 189 kilometers (117 mi) south of Pskov, the administrative center of the oblast. Population: 6,375 (2010 census); 7,138 (2002 census); 9,497 (1989 Soviet census).

== History ==
Historical affiliations

Grand Duchy of Lithuania 1414–1535
Grand Duchy of Moscow 1535–1547
Tsardom of Russia 1547–1618
Polish–Lithuanian Commonwealth 1618–1772
Russian Empire 1772–1917
Russian Republic 1917
Soviet Russia 1917–1922
Soviet Union 1922–1991
Russian Federation 1991–present

It was first mentioned in 1414 as a fortress protecting Pskov from the south, when Vytautas of Lithuania sacked it. In 1535 it was captured by Muscovy. Prince Ivan Shuysky built a wooden fortress there in 1535. In the 16th century, the fortress defended the Western approaches to the Grand Duchy of Moscow. In 1581, King Stephen Báthory of Poland demanded the restoration of Siebież from Muscovy to the Polish-Lithuanian Commonwealth, but to no avail, however Lithuanian and Polish troops recaptured it during the Polish–Muscovite War of 1605–1618 and held it until the First Partition of Poland. The fortifications of Sebezh, now dismantled, were reinforced at the behest of Peter the Great during the Great Northern War. The castle hill is still dominated by the Roman Catholic Church, built in 1625-1648 and reconsecrated as a Russian Orthodox Church in 1989.

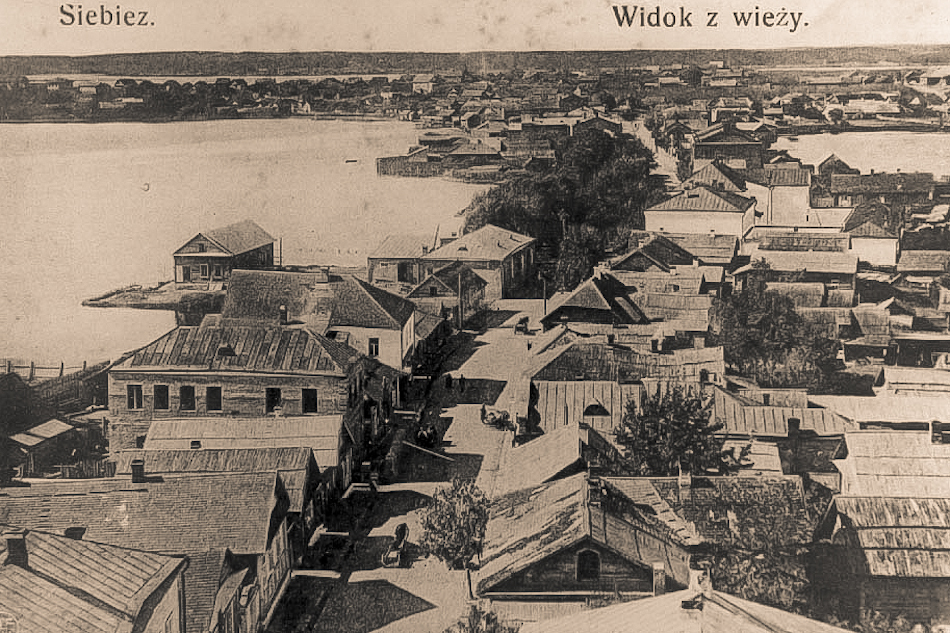
Sebezh before 1918

From 1802 to 1924, Sebezh was the seat of Sebezhsky Uyezd of Vitebsk Governorate. In 1897, the ethnic make-up, by mother tongue, was 59.3% Jewish, 22.8% Belarusian, 14.3% Russian, and 2.8% Polish. On August 1, 1927, the uyezds and governorates were abolished and Sebezhsky District, with the administrative center in Sebezh, was established as a part of Velikiye Luki Okrug of Leningrad Oblast. It included parts of former Sebezhsky Uyezd. On June 3, 1929, Sebezhsky District was transferred to Western Oblast. On July 23, 1930, the okrugs were also abolished and the districts were directly subordinated to the oblast. On January 29, 1935, Western Oblast was abolished and the district was transferred to Kalinin Oblast, and on February 5 of the same year, Sebezhsky District became a part of Velikiye Luki Okrug of Kalinin Oblast, one of the okrugs abutting the state boundaries of the Soviet Union. On May 4, 1938, the district was transferred to Opochka Okrug. On February 5, 1941, the okrug was abolished. Between July 9, 1941 and July 17, 1944, Sebezh was occupied by German troops. On August 22, 1944, the district was transferred to newly established Velikiye Luki Oblast. On October 2, 1957, Velikiye Luki Oblast was abolished and Sebezhsky District was transferred to Pskov Oblast.

Historical population
Year	Pop.	±%
1867	2,909	—
1886	4,051	+39.3%
1897	4,326	+6.8%
1989	9,497	+119.5%
2002	7,138	−24.8%
2010	6,375	−10.7%

According to the 1939 population census, there were 845 Jews living in Sebezh. The SS Division “Totenkopf” arrived in the town on July 7, 1941. Many Jews managed to escape during this period, via a cattle car sent by Major Solomon Zharzhavsky to evacuate the city. During the entire occupation, which lasted from July 1941 to July 1944, there was an Ortskommandantur in the town. There was an Ordnungsdienst, too. A ghetto was created in September 1941 and existed until March 1942. After that, it was liquidated. During the liquidation, more than 100 Jews were shot in pits. The perpetrators of the shooting were local Russian policemen.

== Administrative and municipal status ==
Within the framework of administrative divisions, Sebezh serves as the administrative center of Sebezhsky District, to which it is directly subordinated. As a municipal division, the town of Sebezh, together with sixty-eight rural localities, is incorporated within Sebezhsky Municipal District as Sebezh Urban Settlement.

== Economy ==
=== Transportation ===
The M9 Highway, which connects Moscow and Riga, passes Sebezh. Another road connects Sebezh with Opochka. There are also local roads.

The railway connecting Moscow and Riga also passes Sebezh.

== Culture and recreation ==
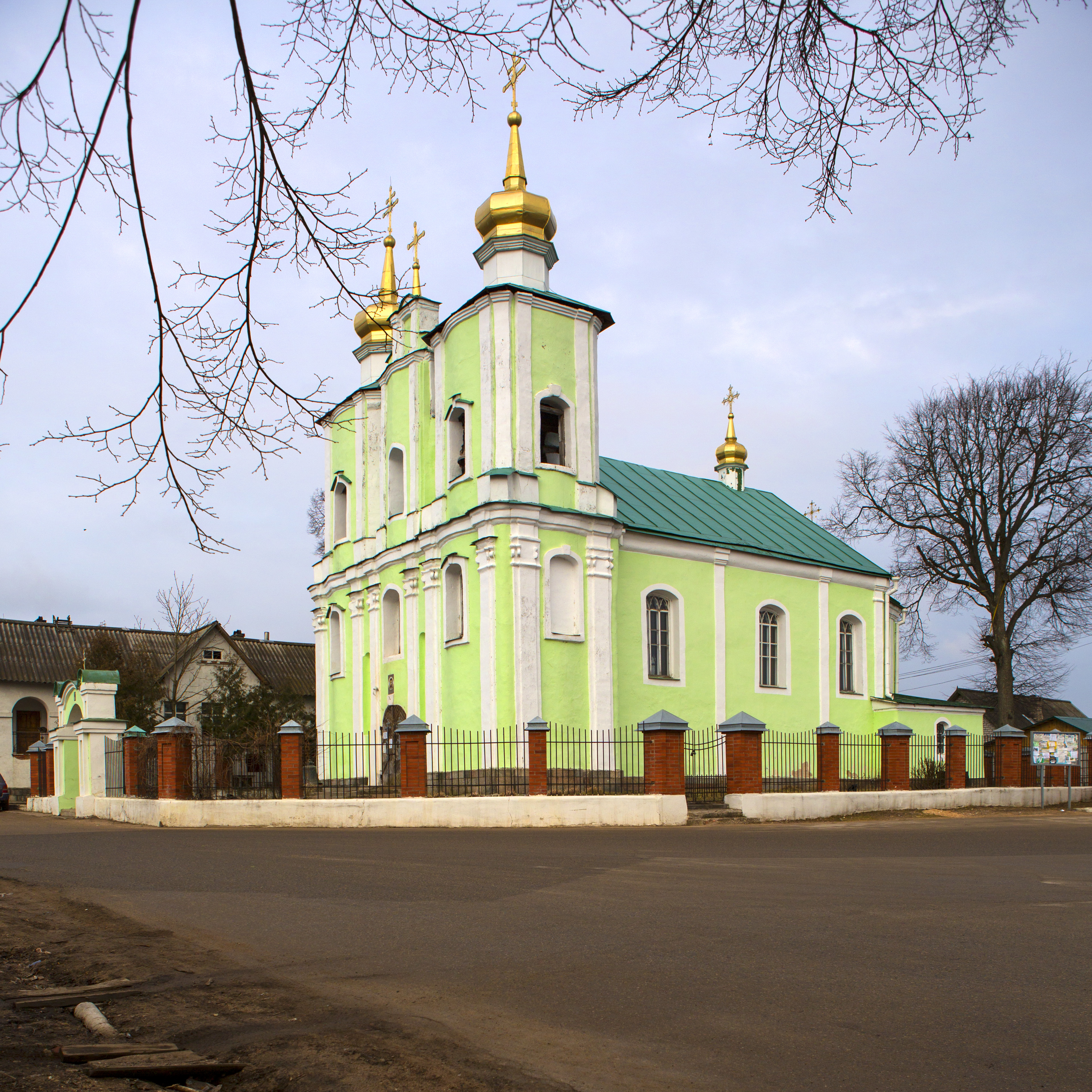
Holy Trinity Church

Sebezh contains one cultural heritage monument of federal significance and additionally fifteen objects classified as cultural and historical heritage of local significance. The federally protected monument is the Trinity Church, a formerly Catholic church consecrated in 1648, when Sebezh was still part of the Polish–Lithuanian Commonwealth. It is probably the oldest baroque structure in Russia. As of 2013, the church is closed to the public because of reconstruction.

Sebezh is home to the Sebezh District Museum, founded in 1927 and displaying collections of local interest.

== Notable people ==
- Semyon Dimanstein, Jewish Soviet state activist, publisher
- Zinovy Gerdt, Russian Soviet actor
- Witold Rudziński, Polish composer
