= Zilupe =

Town in Ludza Municipality, Latvia

Zilupe Sīnuoja, Rosenau, Розеново
- Town
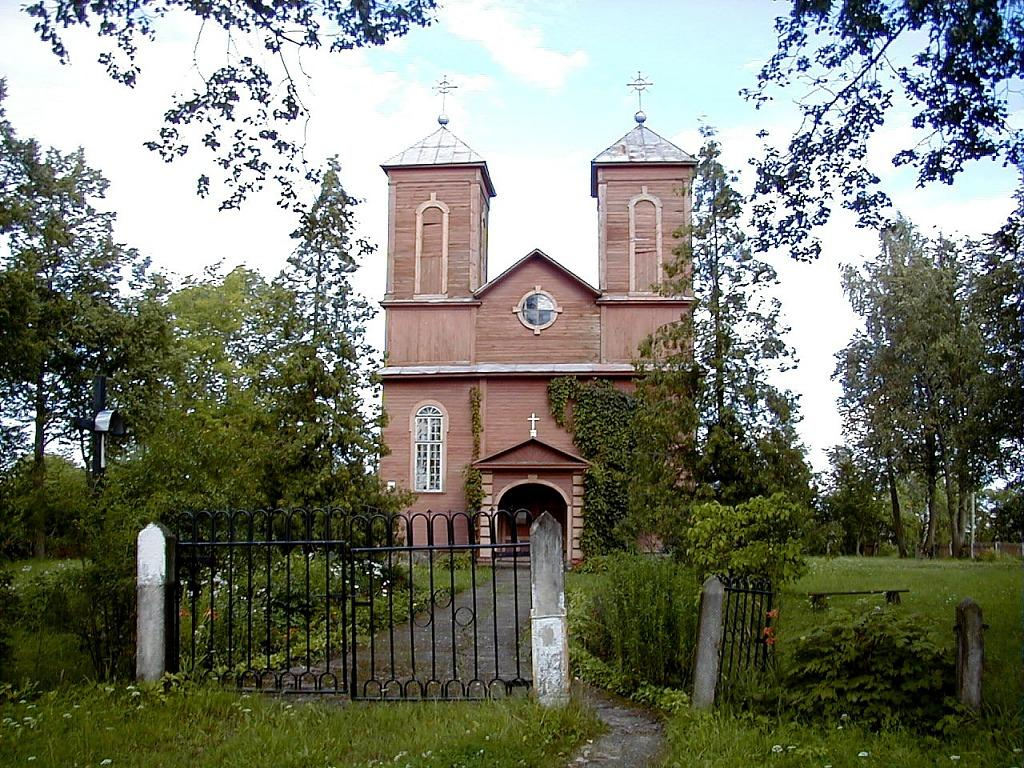
- Roman Catholic church in Zilupe

- Coat of arms

- Location in Latvia
- Coordinates: 56°23′N 28°07′E
- Country: Latvia
- Municipality: Ludza Municipality
- Town rights: 1931

Area
  - Total: 4.69 km^{2} (1.81 sq mi)
  - Land: 4.55 km^{2} (1.76 sq mi)
  - Water: 0.14 km^{2} (0.054 sq mi)

Population (2026)
  - Total: 1,163
  - Density: 256/km^{2} (662/sq mi)
- Time zone: UTC+2 (EET)
  - Summer (DST): UTC+3 (EEST)
- Calling code: +371 657
- Website: http://www.zilupe.junik.lv/i.htm

Zilupe (Latgalian: Sīnuoja, from sīna 'border'; German: Rosenau; Russian: Розеново) is a town in Ludza Municipality, in the Latgale region of Latvia, by the Zilupe River, on the border with Russia. The population in 2020 was 1,343. Zilupe's railway station is the final station for the Riga-Zilupe train route, which is one of the longest passenger rail routes in Latvia. The town first began to take shape during construction of the Ventspils-Moscow railway line in 1900, the station taking the name Rozenova, after the former landowner. Near the station, a small settlement of merchants and railroad workers formed. In 1908 there was already a police department, school and post office in Rozenova.

Further development of settlement was interrupted by the First World War. In 1918 the railway bridge over Zilupe River was destroyed. From 1918 until 1920 Rozenova like all of Eastern Latvia was under Soviet rule. In January 1920 Rozenova was liberated by the Latvian army in the final stage of the Latvian War of Independence.

After becoming part of the Republic of Latvia the settlement was renamed after the river Zilupe. In the interwar period Zilupe was an important centre in the region. In 1925 it was granted status of the village and in 1931, town rights. Inhabitants of Zilupe were mainly involved in trade and agriculture. In the 1930s there was a water mill and sawmill in Zilupe and also a small hospital and around 120 shops.

During World War II, Zilupe was occupied by the German Army from 6 July 1941 until 18 July 1944 and administered as part of Reichskommissariat Ostland.

After World War II several large enterprises opened their divisions in Zilupe. These included a metal fabricating workshop, small textile factory and bakery.

The town is near the A12 road, that after the border crossing into Russia turns into the M9, both of which are part of European route E22.

== See also ==
- List of cities and towns in Latvia
