= Pushkinogorsky District =

Pushkinogorsky District Пушкиногорский район (Russian)
- District
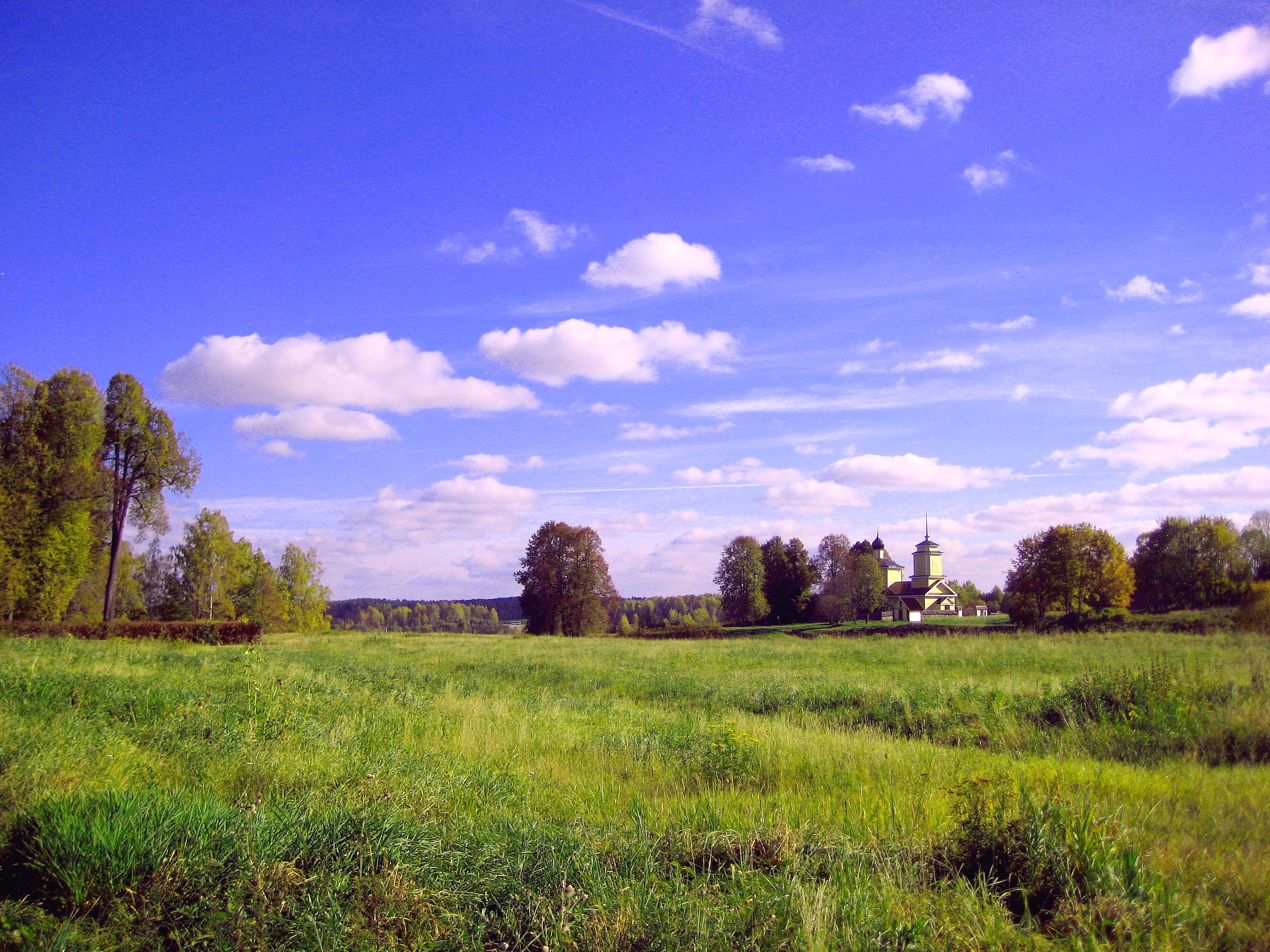
- Landscape in Pushkinogorsky District

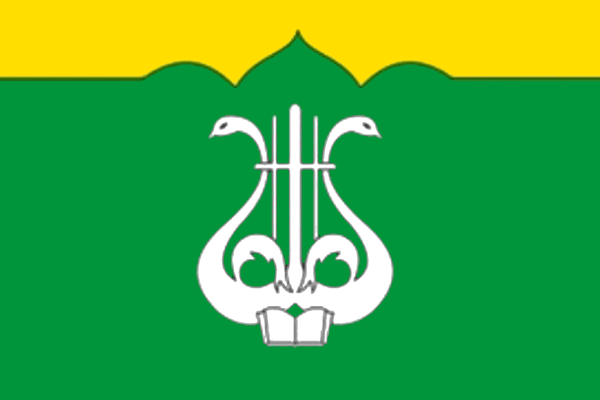
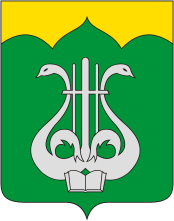
- Flag Coat of arms
- Location of Pushkinogorsky District in Pskov Oblast
- Coordinates: 57°01′N 28°55′E
- Country: Russia
- Federal subject: Pskov Oblast
- Established: 1927
- Administrative center: Pushkinskiye Gory

Area
  - Total: 1,059 km^{2} (409 sq mi)

Population (2010 Census)
  - Total: 9,253
  - Density: 8.737/km^{2} (22.63/sq mi)
  - Urban: 56.4%
  - Rural: 43.6%

Administrative structure
  - Inhabited localities: 1 urban-type settlements, 326 rural localities

Municipal structure
  - Municipally incorporated as: Pushkinogorsky Municipal District
  - Municipal divisions: 1 urban settlements, 3 rural settlements
- Time zone: UTC+3 (MSK)
- OKTMO ID: 58651000
- Website: http://pushgory.reg60.ru

Pushkinogorsky District (Russian: Пушкиного́рский райо́н) is an administrative and municipal district (raion), one of the twenty-four in Pskov Oblast, Russia. It is located in the center of the oblast and borders with Ostrovsky District in the north, Novorzhevsky District in the east, Opochetsky District in the south, and with Krasnogorodsky District in the west. The area of the district is 1,059 square kilometers (409 sq mi). Its administrative center is the urban locality (a work settlement) of Pushkinskiye Gory. Population: 9,253 (2010 census); 11,694 (2002 Census); 13,566 (1989 Soviet census). The population of Pushkinskiye Gory accounts for 56.4% of the district's total population.

== Geography ==
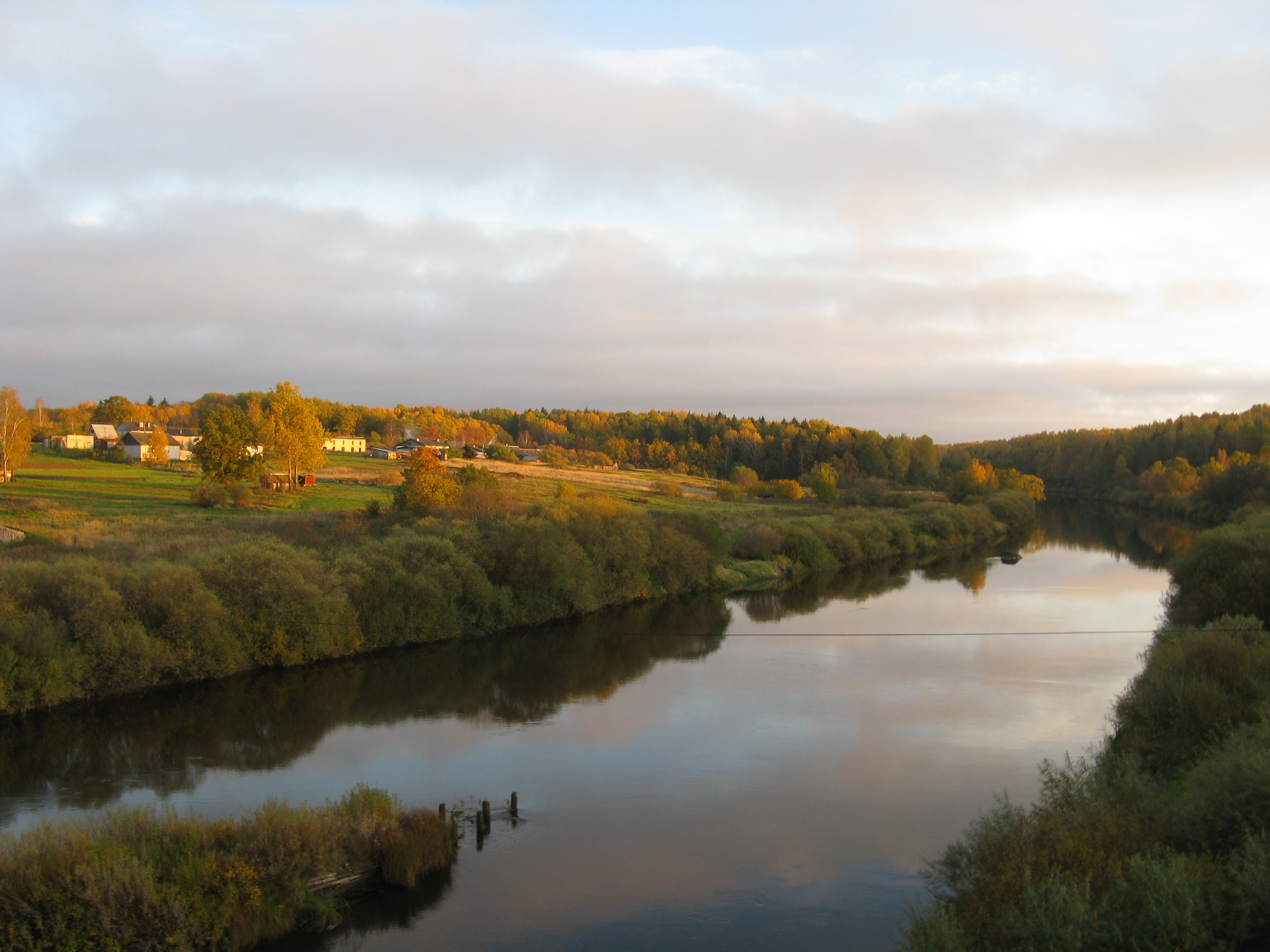
The Velikaya River in the village of Selikhnovo

The whole of the district lies in the basin of the Velikaya River, and thus of the Narva River. The Velikaya crosses the district from south to north dividing it into two approximately equal parts. The biggest tributaries of the Velikaya within the limits of the district are the Issa River (left) and the Sorot River (right). There are many lakes in the district, the biggest of which are Lakes Velye (shared with Krasnogorodsky District), Kuchane, and Beloguli.

The western and the northwestern parts of the district, and especially the part west of the Velikaya, are flat; the rest is hilly. Swamps occupy considerable areas in the district, especially in the west. There are peat deposits.

== History ==
The area has been populated since at least the 10th century and was subordinate to Pskov. The fortress of Voronich was founded in 1349 and was one of the most important fortifications protecting Pskov from the south. In the beginning of the 16th century, the area together with the rest of the Pskov lands was transferred to the Grand Duchy of Moscow. Voronich was destroyed during the Livonian War in the end of the 16th century.

In the course of the administrative reform carried out in 1708 by Peter the Great, the area was included into Ingermanland Governorate (known since 1710 as Saint Petersburg Governorate). In 1727, separate Novgorod Governorate was split off, and in 1772, Pskov Governorate (which between 1777 and 1796 existed as Pskov Viceroyalty) was established. The area was a part of Opochetsky Uyezd of Pskov Governorate.

On August 1, 1927, the uyezds were abolished, and Pushkinsky District was established, with the administrative center in the selo of Pushkinskiye Gory. It included parts of former Opochetsky Uyezd. The governorates were abolished as well, and the district became a part of Pskov Okrug of Leningrad Oblast. On July 23, 1930, the okrugs were also abolished and the districts were directly subordinated to the oblast. On January 1, 1932, parts of abolished Krasnogorodsky District were merged into Pushkinsky District. On January 29, 1935, the district was transferred to Kalinin Oblast and on February 5 of the same year, Pushkinsky District became a part of Velikiye Luki Okrug of Kalinin Oblast, one of the okrugs abutting the state boundaries of the Soviet Union. On March 5, 1935, Krasnogorodsky District was re-established. On May 11, 1937, the district was transferred to Opochka Okrug and renamed Pushkinogorsky District. On February 5, 1941, the okrug was abolished. Between July 1941 and July 1944, Pushkinogorsky District was occupied by German troops. On August 23, 1944, the district was transferred to newly established Pskov Oblast. On February 29, 1960, Pushkinskiye Gory was granted urban-type settlement status.

On February 1, 1963, the district was abolished and split between Novorzhevsky and Opochetsky District as a part of abortive Khrushchev's administrative reform. On December 30, 1966, it was re-established.

== Economy ==
=== Industry ===
In the district, there are enterprises of food and timber industry.

=== Agriculture ===
The main specializations of agriculture in the district are cattle breeding with meat and milk production, egg production, as well as crops, potatoes, and vegetables growing.

=== Transportation ===
Pushkinskiye Gory is located on the highway between Novgorodka and Novorzhev. In Novgorodka, it has access to the M20 highway which connects St. Petersburg and Vitebsk via Pskov. The M20 highway crosses the western part of the district from north to south. There are also local roads.

== Culture and recreation ==
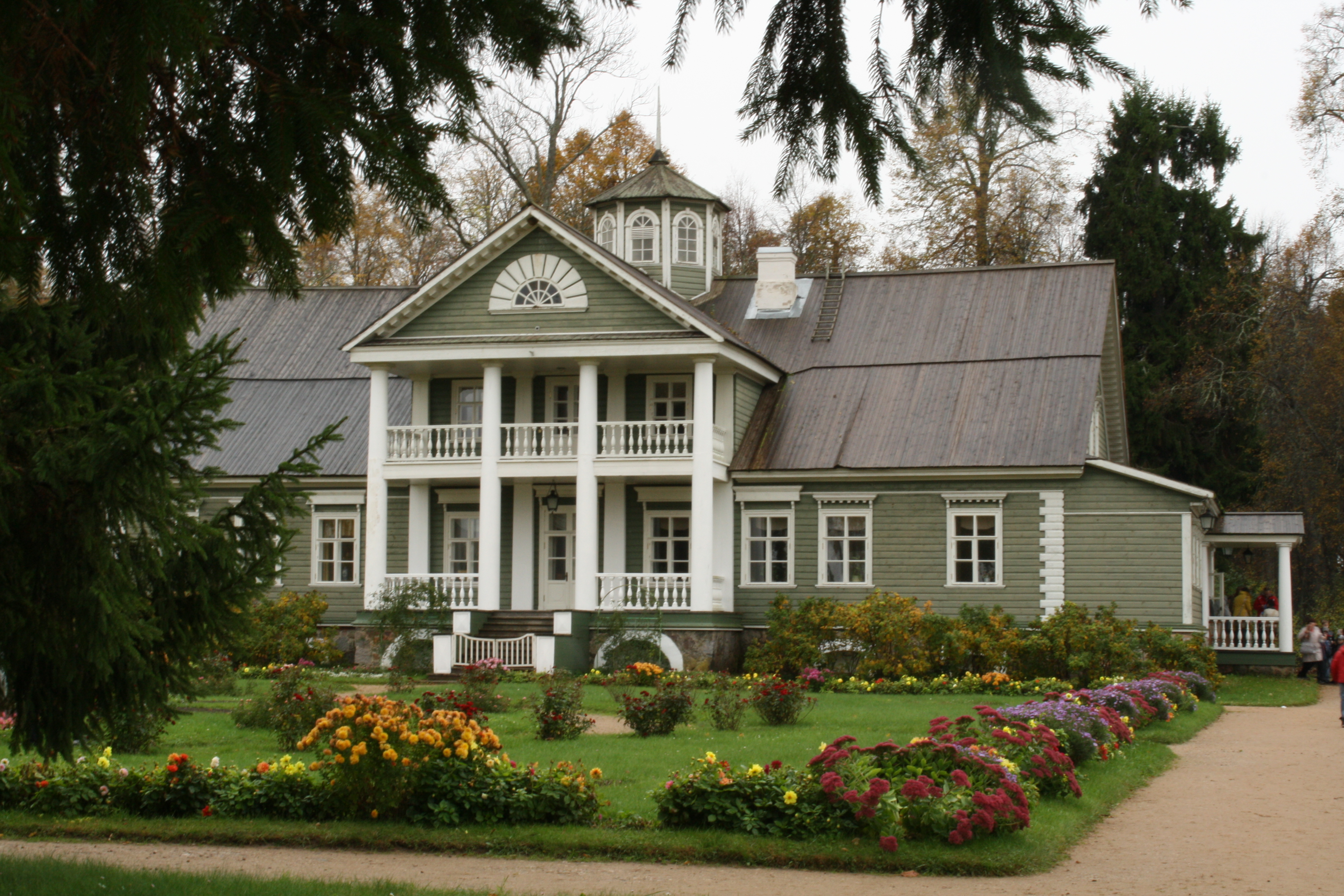
Pyotr Gannibal estate in the village of Petrovskoye

The district contains thirty-two cultural heritage monuments of federal significance and additionally forty-two objects classified as cultural and historical heritage of local significance. The majority of the federally protected monuments are grouped in and around the Mikhaylovskoye Museum Reserve, a large museum complex located in Pushkinskiye Gory and the surrounding villages. The complex is devoted to Alexander Pushkin, a Russian 19th century national poet, who owned an estate in the village of Mikhaylovskoye and spent there considerable periods of his life. He was buried in Svyatogorsky Monastery in what is currently Pushkinskiye Gory. Other monuments are archeological sites.
