= Lake Sebezhskoye =

- Sebezh
- Себежское озеро (Russian)
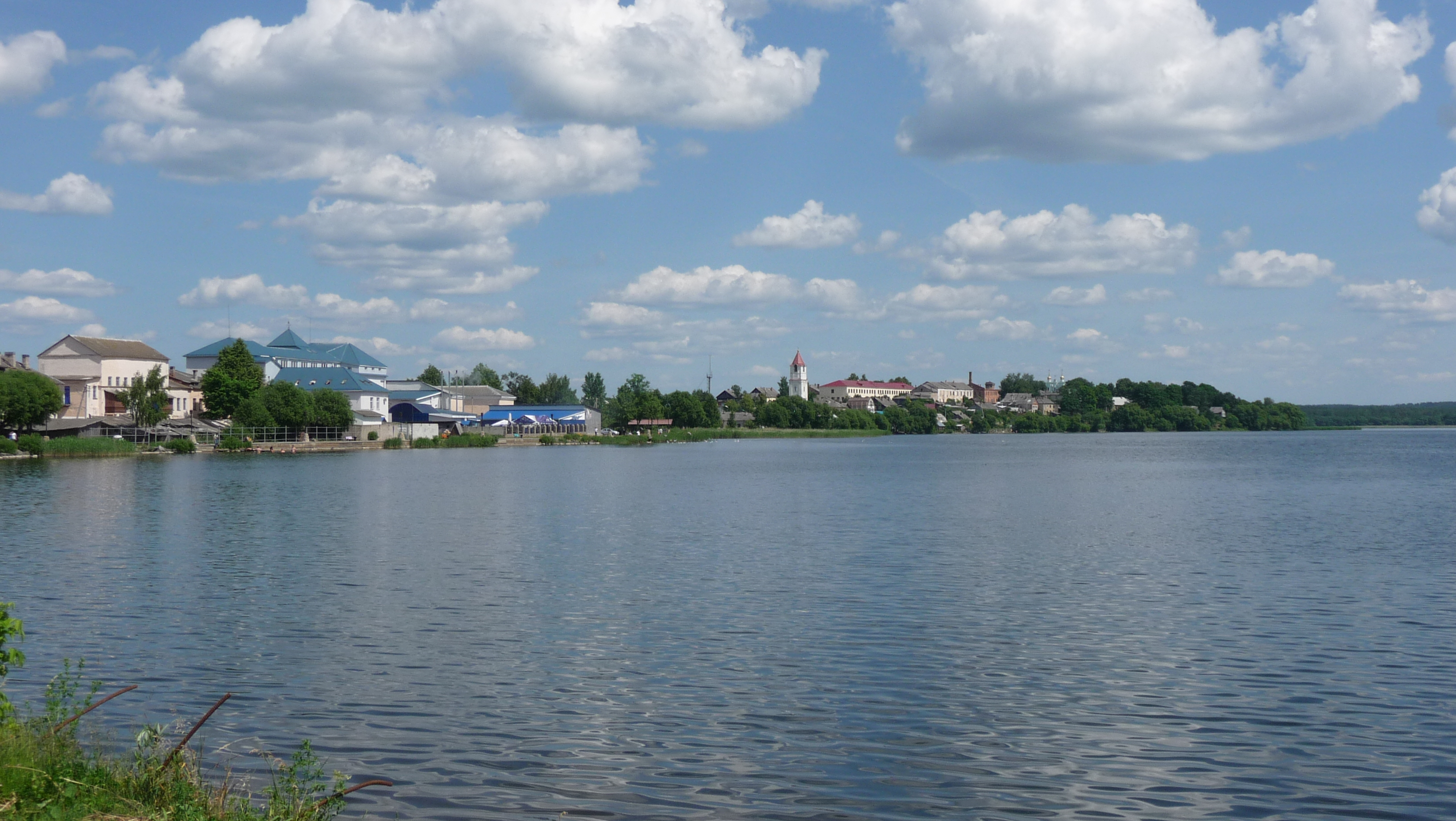
- Lake Sebezh

- Location within Russia
- Location: Pskov Oblast, Russia
- Coordinates: 56.266667°N 28.5°E
- Type: lake
- Surface area: 15.8 square kilometres (6.1 mi^{2})
- Max. depth: 10 m (33 ft)
- Surface elevation: 126 m (413 ft)

Sebezhskoye or Sebezh (Себежское озеро) is a freshwater lake in the southwest of Pskov Oblast in Russia, close to the borders with Latvia and Belarus. It has a surface area of 15.8 square kilometres (6.1 mi^{2}). The lake takes its name from Sebezh, a town sitting on a low-lying promontory jutting out into the lake.

The lake surface lies 126 metres (413 ft) above sea level. Its maximum depth is 10 metres (33 ft). In 1996, the lake basin with a cluster of similar lakes was designated the Sebezhsky National Park.

The biggest tributary of the lake is the Cherneya River, which drains into Lake Sebezhskoye from the east. The outflow of the lake is the Ugarinka River which flows to the west and crosses a narrow, several hundred meters wide, stretch of land separating Lake Sebezhskoye and Lake Orono, another big lake in the area. Both lakes belong to the drainage basin of the Daugava.
