= Lake Osveya =

Lake in Vitebsk Region, Belarus

- Lake Asvieja; Asviejskaje voziera
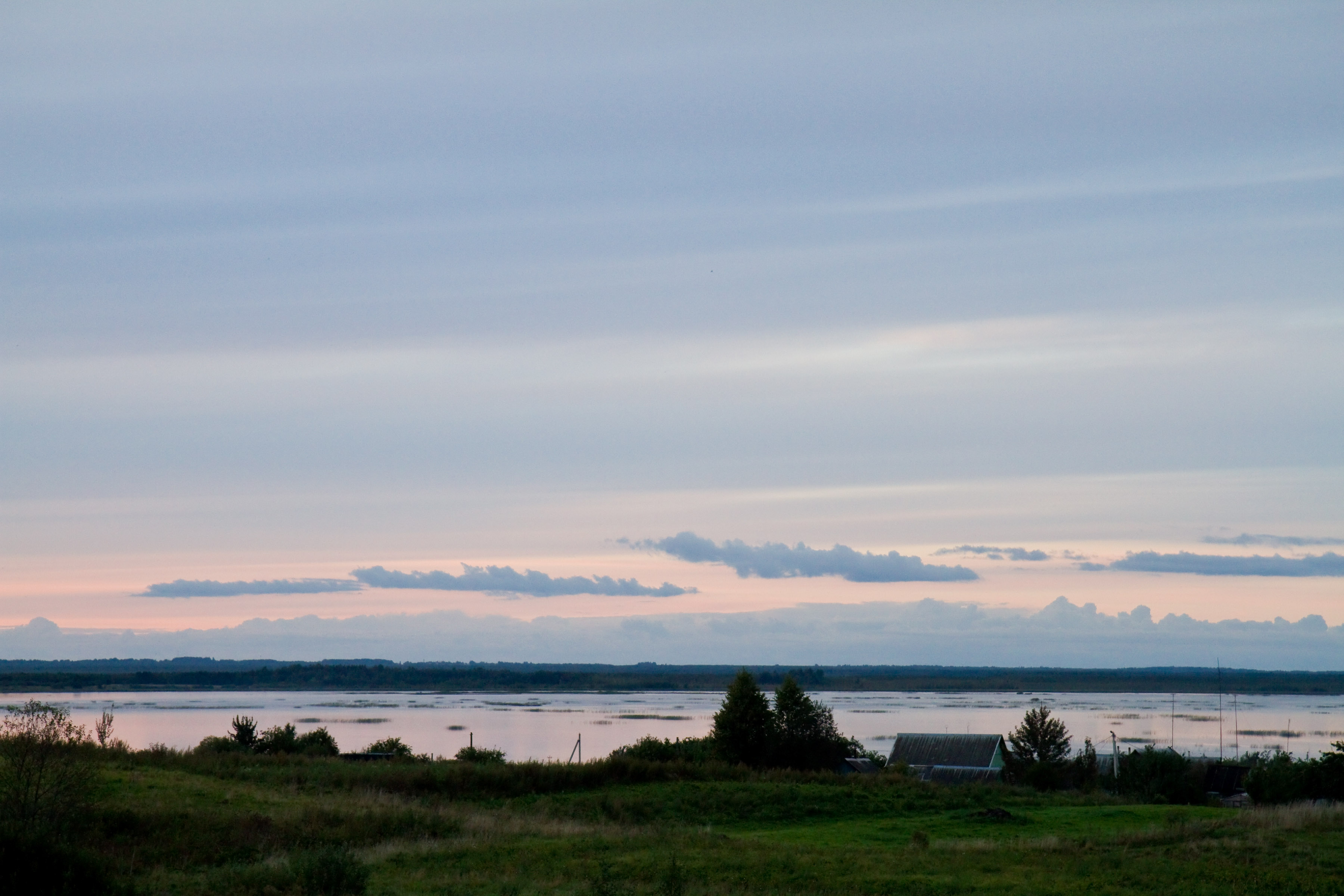

- Location within Belarus
- Location: Belarus
- Coordinates: 56°02′N 28°10′E
- Lake type: freshwater
- Catchment area: 259 km^{2} (100 sq mi)
- Surface area: 52.8 km^{2} (20.4 sq mi)
- Average depth: 2 m (6.6 ft)
- Max. depth: 7.5 m (25 ft)
- Shore length^{1}: 33.4 km (20.8 mi)
- Surface elevation: 129.8 m (426 ft)
- ^{1} Shore length is not a well-defined measure.

Lake Osveya or Lake Osveyskoye (Russian: озеро Осве́я, Осве́йское озеро, romanized: ozero Osveya, Osveyskoye ozero), also known as Lake Asvyeya (Belarusian: Асвейскае возера, romanized: Asviejskaje voziera), is a large freshwater lake in the Vitebsk Region, in northern Belarus, near the borders with Latvia and Russia. It has an area of 52.8 km^{2} (20 sq mi), making it the second largest lake in the country. The most extreme northern point in Belarus is situated only a few minutes further north of the lake.

The lake's sole island, Du, is the largest island in Belarus. Inhabited by a village and a kolkhoz until the 1970s, it is now a part of the Asviejski Landscape Reserve.
