= Velikaya =

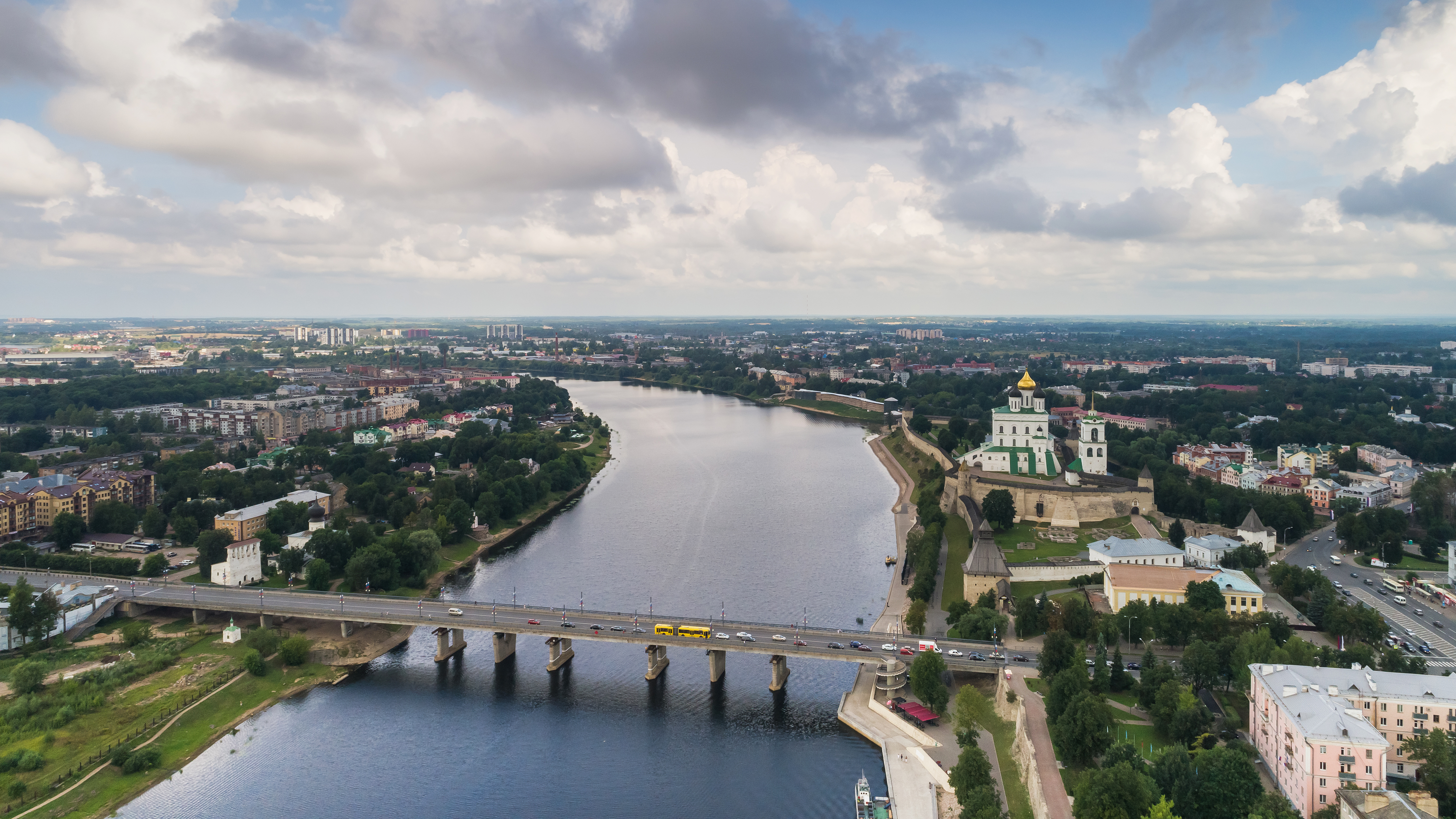
- The Velikaya in the city of Pskov

Location
- Country: Russia

Physical characteristics
- Mouth: Lake Peipus
  - coordinates: 57°51′30″N 28°9′10″E
- Length: 430 km (270 mi)
- Basin size: 25,200 km^{2} (9,700 sq mi)
- Discharge
  - average: 134 m^{3}/s (4,700 cu ft/s)

Basin features
- Progression: Lake Peipus→ Narva→ Gulf of Finland
- Max. depth: 7 m (23 ft)

The Velikaya (Russian: Вели́кая) is a river in Novosokolnichesky, Pustoshkinsky, Sebezhsky, Opochetsky, Pushkinogorsky, Ostrovsky, Palkinsky, and Pskovsky Districts of Pskov Oblast, as well as in the city of Pskov in Russia. It is the largest tributary of Lake Peipus and belongs to the drainage basin of the Narva. It is 430 kilometres (270 mi) long, and the area of its basin 25,200 square kilometres (9,700 sq mi). The name of the river literally means "Grand" or "Great" in Russian. The towns of Opochka, Ostrov and Pskov are located on the banks of the Velikaya. The principal tributaries of the Velikaya are the Alolya (right), the Issa (left), the Sorot (right), the Sinyaya (left), the Utroya (left), the Kukhva (left), the Cheryokha (right), and the Pskova (right).

The source of the Velikaya is located in the Bezhanitsy Hills in the northwest of Novosokolnichesky District. The river flows south through a system of lakes to Lake Veryato, where it turns west. It accepts the Alolya from the right and gradually turns north, passing through the town of Opochka. Northwest of the urban-type settlement of Pushkinskiye Gory it turns west, accepts the Sinyaya from the left and turns north. In the city of Pskov the Velikaya accepts the Pskova from the right and turns northwest, forming a river delta as it enters Lake Peipus.

The drainage basin of the Velikaya comprises vast areas in the west and southwest of Pskov Oblast, as well as in the east of Latvia and in the north of the Vitebsk Region of Belarus.

The river has a significant historic importance. Pskov was founded in 903, and the Velikaya provided it with access to the sea, via Lake Peipus and the Narva River.

The Velikaya is navigable in its lower course of length 34 kilometres (21 mi).

== Gallery ==
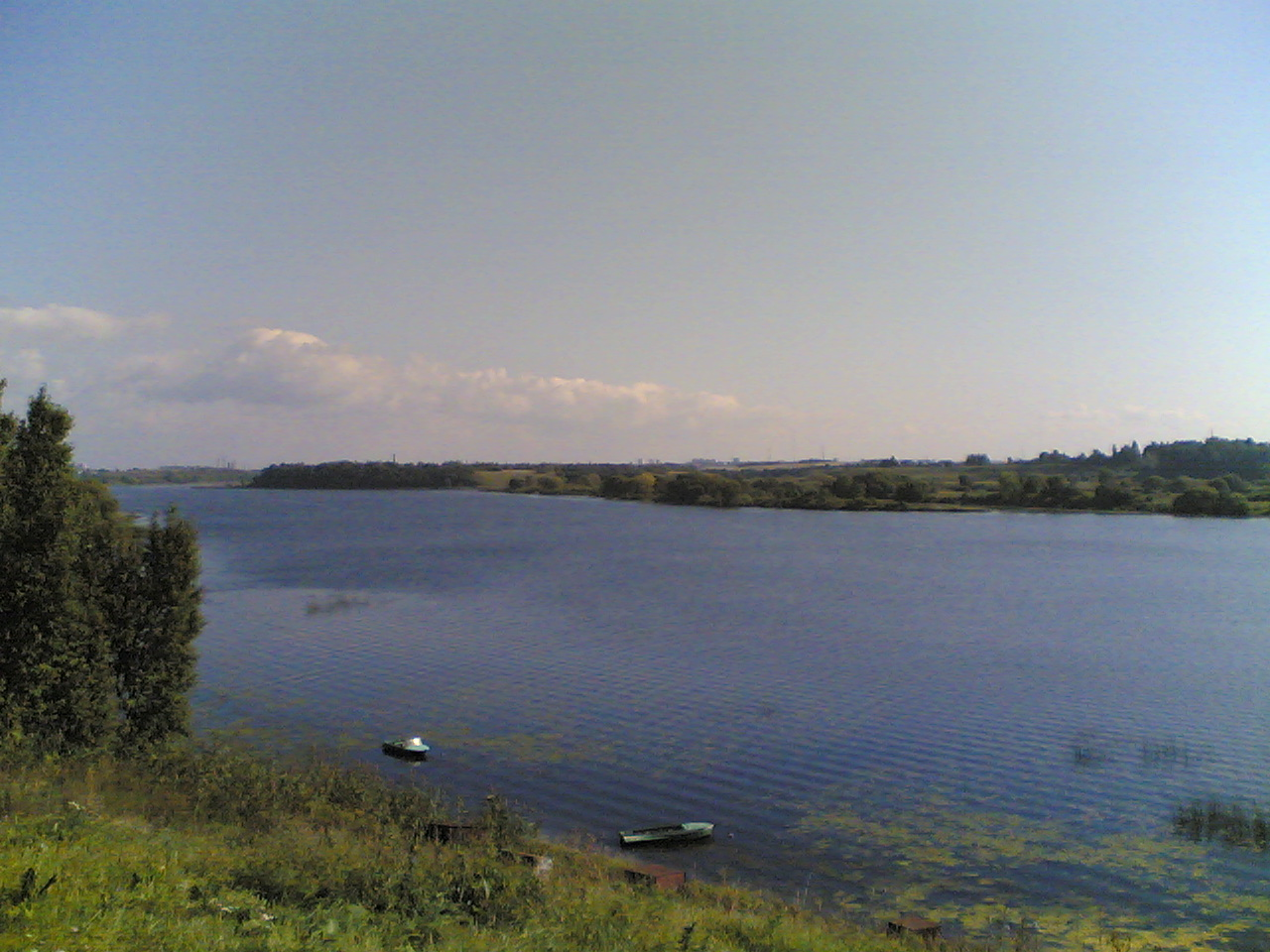
The Velikaya in Piskovichi, Pskovsky district

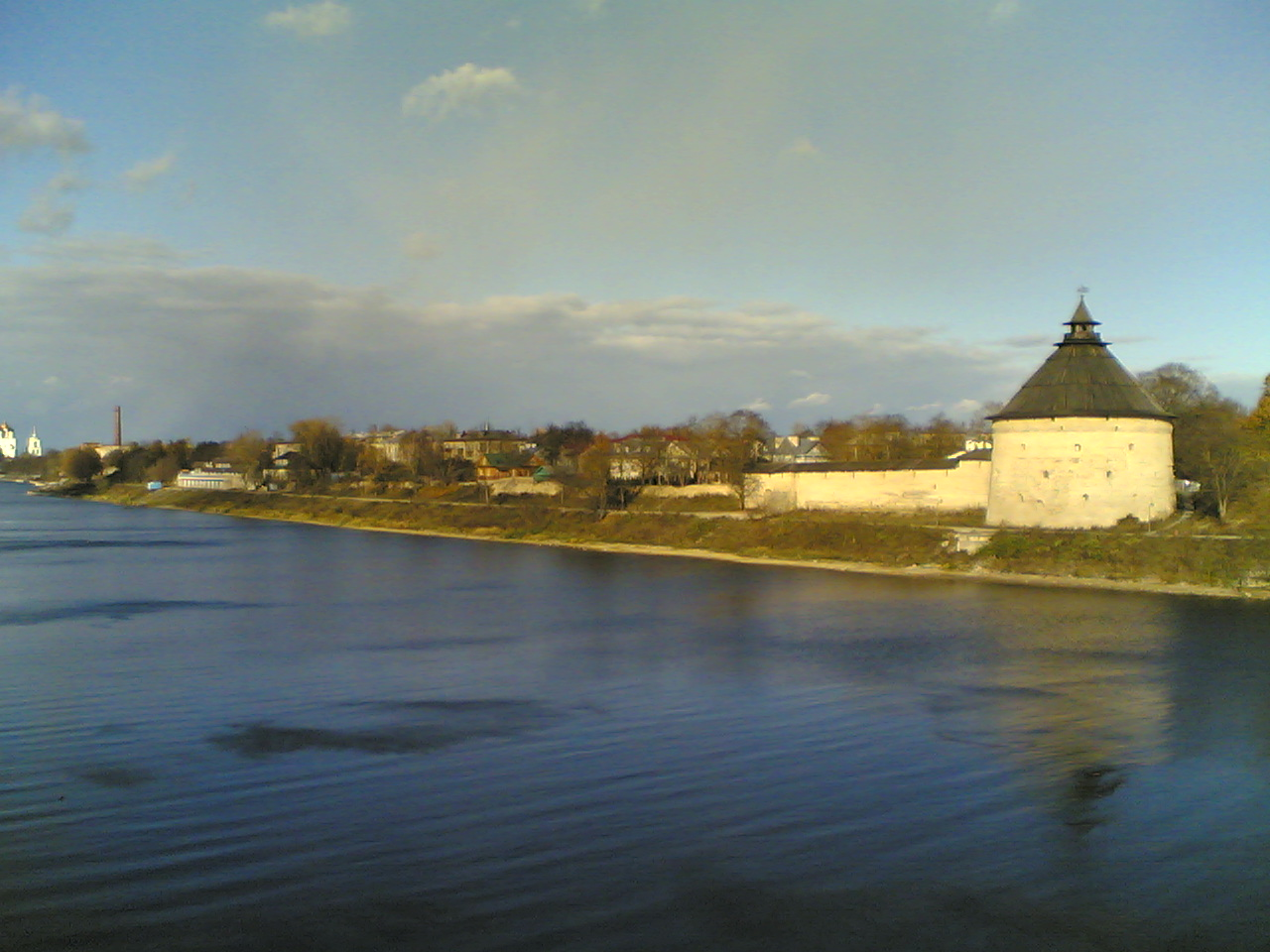
The Velikaya in the city of Pskov, near Pskov Krom

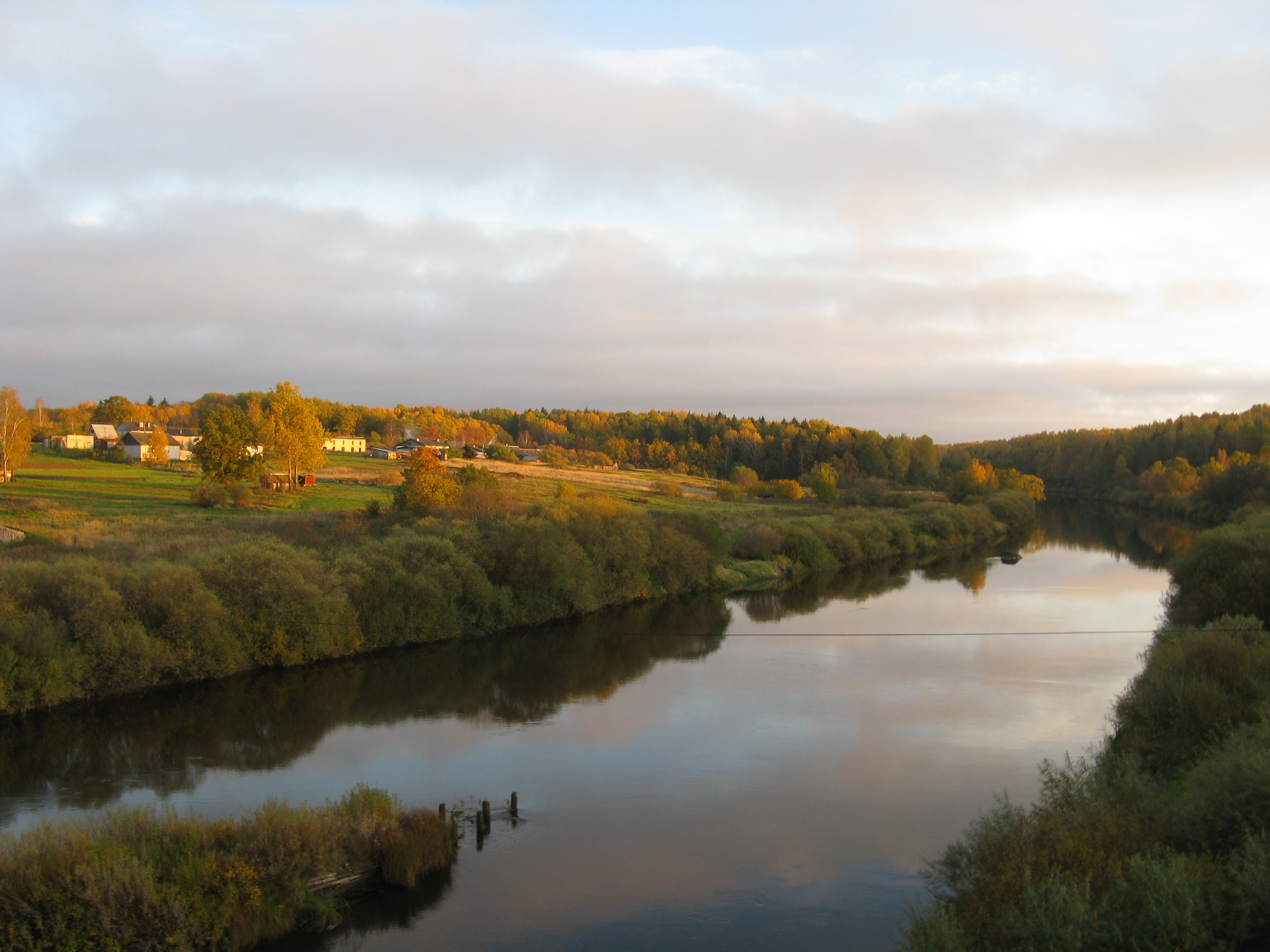
The Velikaya in Selikhnovo, Pushkinogorsky district
