= Vyerkhnyadzvinsk district =

District of Vitebsk region, Belarus

Verkhnyadzvinsk district Верхнядзвінскі раён (Belarusian)
- District
- Flag Coat of arms

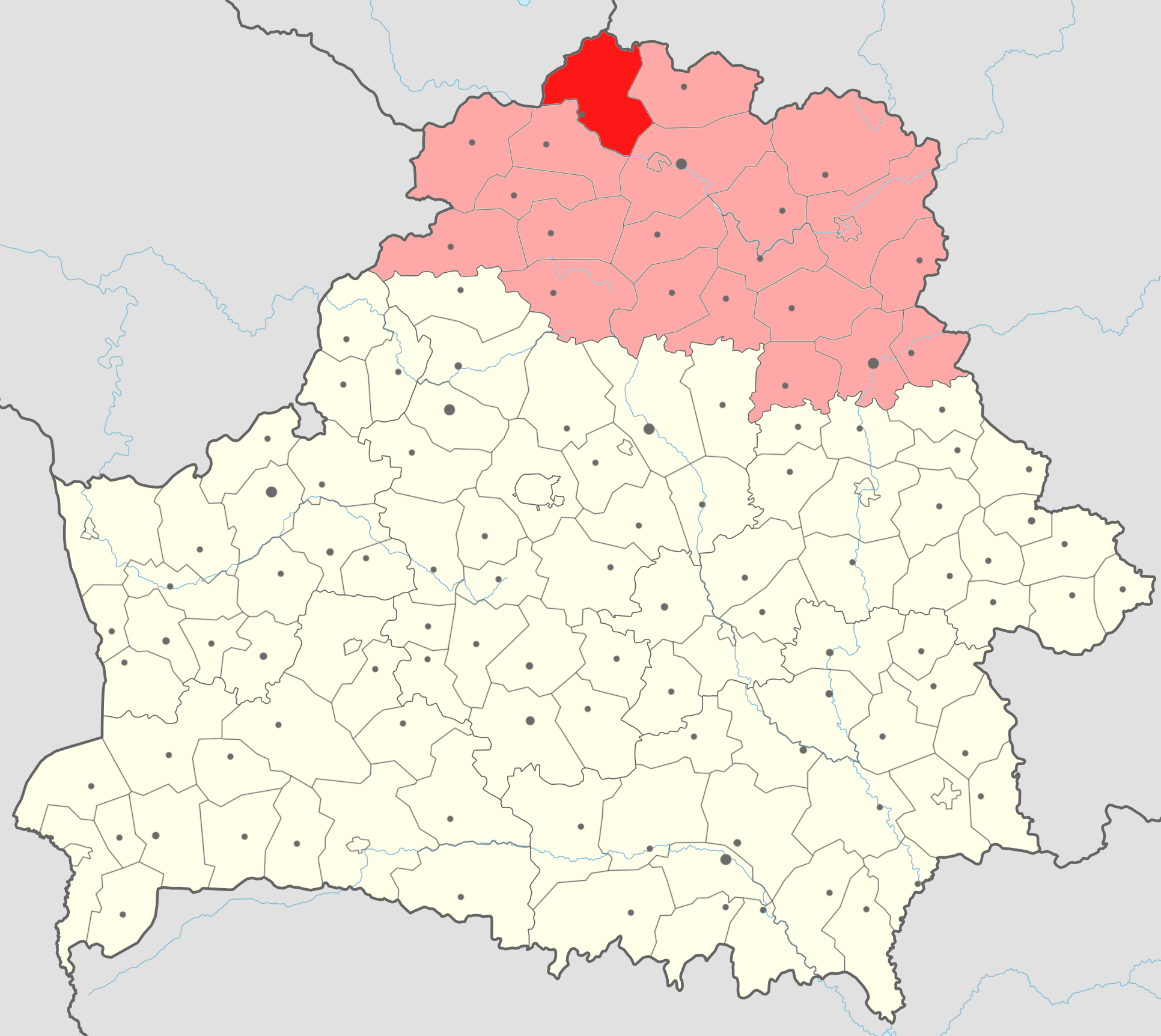
- Coordinates: 55°46′N 27°56′E
- Country: Belarus
- Region: Vitebsk region
- Administrative center: Vyerkhnyadzvinsk

Area
  - Total: 2,140.76 km^{2} (826.55 sq mi)
- Elevation: 191.8 m (629 ft)

Population (2023)
  - Total: 19,032
  - Density: 8.8903/km^{2} (23.026/sq mi)
- Time zone: UTC+3 (MSK)

Vyerkhnyadzvinsk district (Belarusian: Верхнядзьвінскі раён; Russian: Верхнедвинский район) is a district (raion) of Vitebsk region in Belarus. Its administrative center is Vyerkhnyadzvinsk.

In this district is the northernmost point of Belarus, situated to the north of Osveya Lake. Osveya Lake is the second largest lake in the country. Another large lake in Verkhnyadzvinsk district is Lisno, which is the twelfth-largest in Belarus.
