= Estonian national road 63 =

Road in Estonia

- Tugimaantee 63

Route information
- Length: 17.8 km (11.1 mi)

Major junctions
- From: Karisilla ( T45)
- To: Koidula border crossing

Location
- Country: Estonia

Highway system
- Transport in Estonia
← T62	→ T64

Tugimaantee 63 (ofcl. abbr. T63), also called the Karisilla–Petseri highway (Estonian: Karisilla–Petseri maantee), is a 17.8-kilometre-long national basic road in southeastern Estonia. The highway begins at Karisilla on national road 45 and ends at the Koidula border crossing on the Russian border north of Pechory.

== See also ==
- Transport in Estonia
