= Estonia–Russia border =

International border

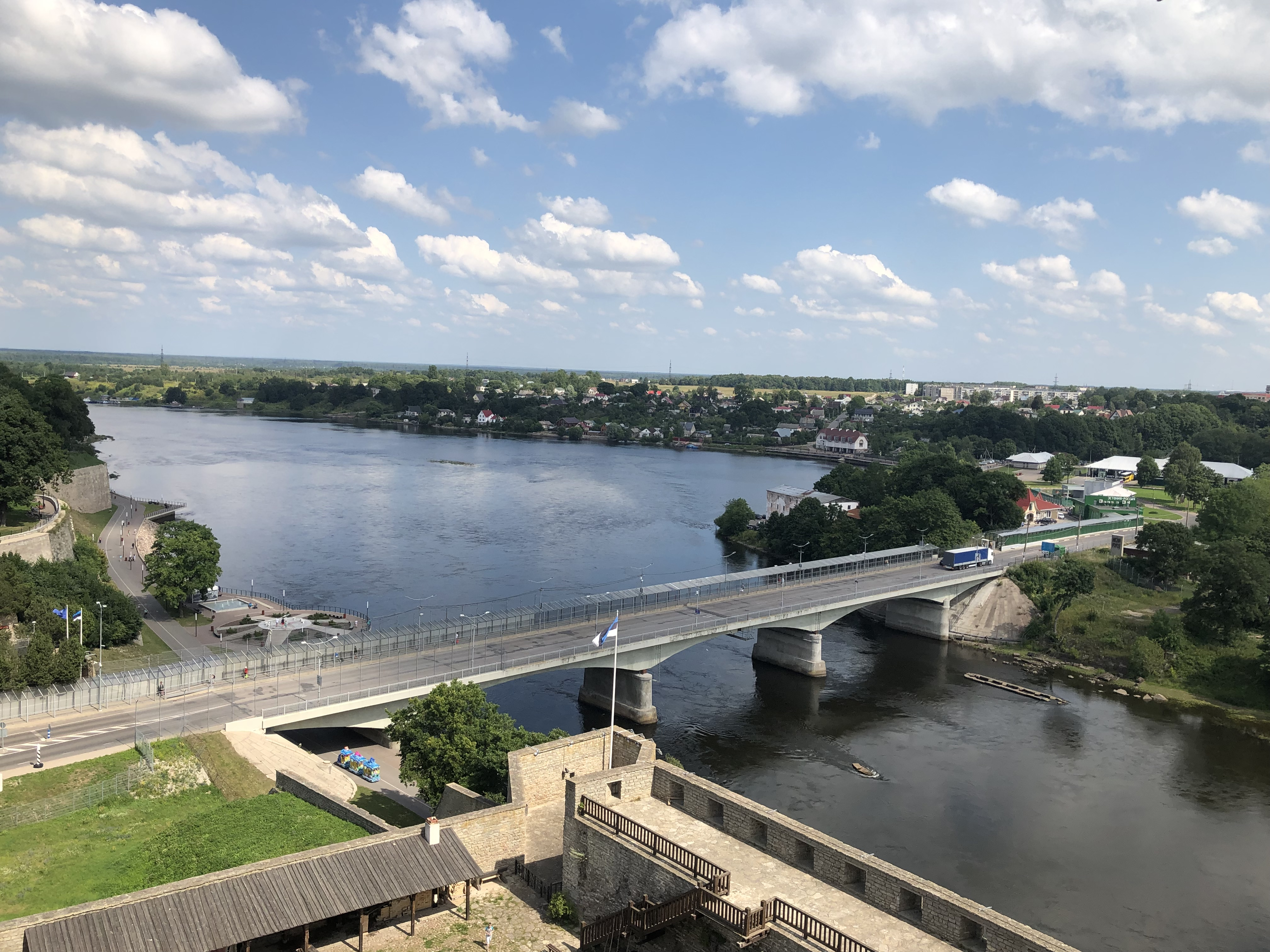
- Bridge over the Narva river view from Narva, on the Estonian side of the border

Characteristics
- Entities: Estonia; Russia
- Length: 294 km (183 mi)

History
- Established: 1918
- Treaties: Treaty of Tartu (1920)

Estonian and Russian boundary markers

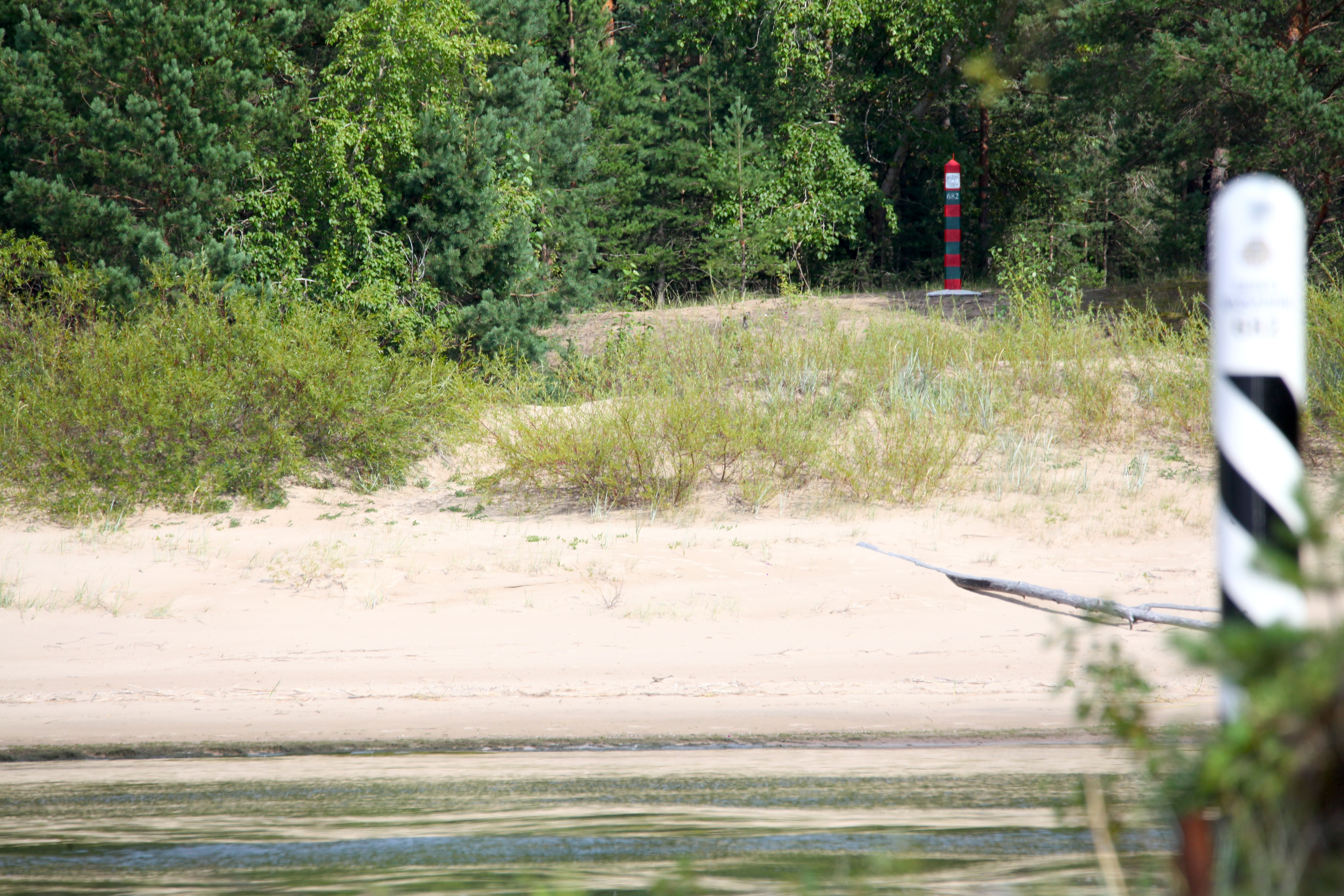
Border posts of Estonia (foreground) and Russia (background) in Narva-Jõesuu by the Narva river and the Baltic Sea (August 2024)

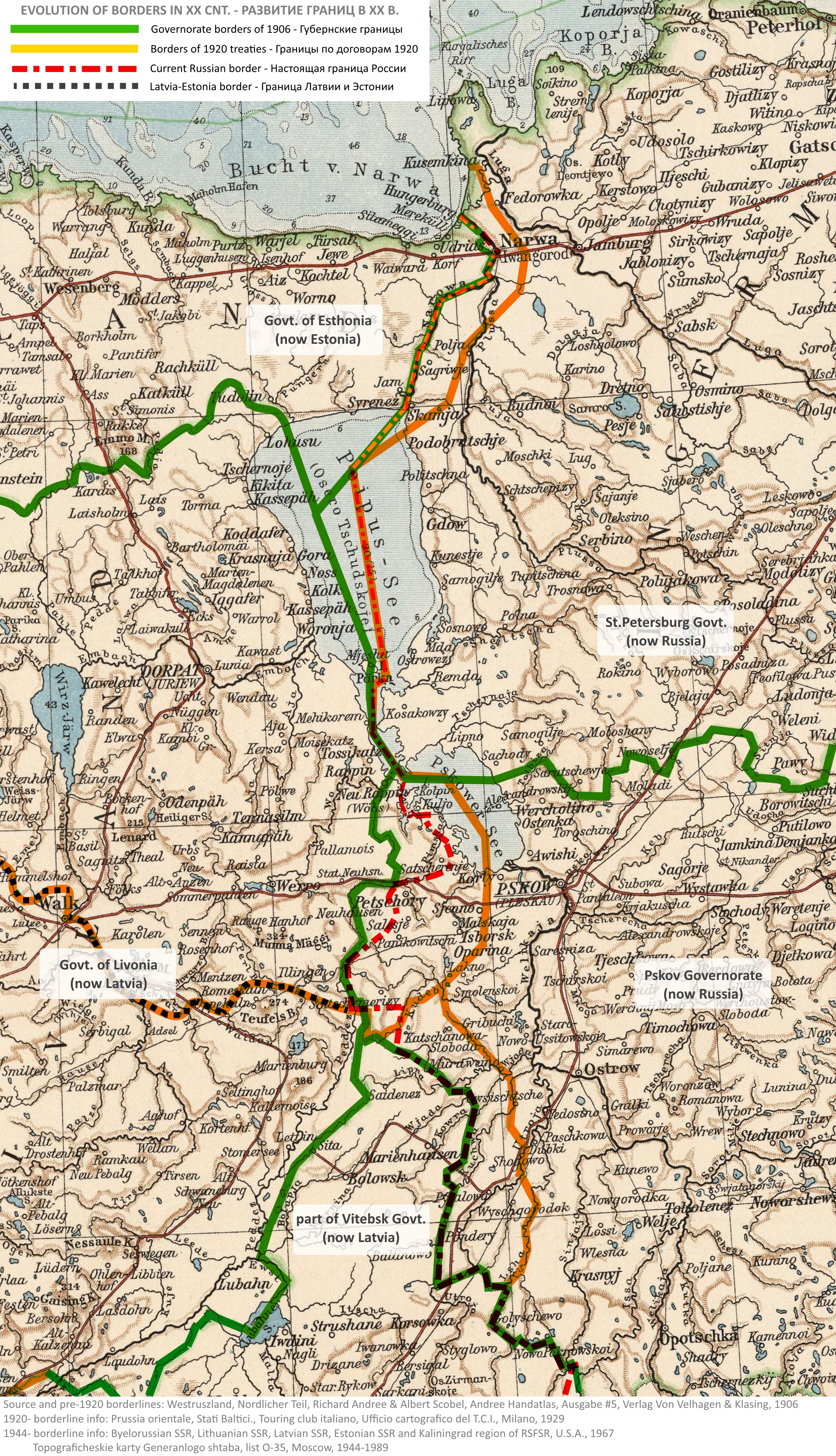
Evolution of borders between Russia, Latvia, and Estonia in the 20th century

The Estonia–Russia border, known in Estonia as the "temporary line of control" (Estonian: Ajutine kontrolljoon) is the disputed border between the Republic of Estonia (EU and NATO member) and the Russian Federation (CIS and CSTO member). The border is 294 kilometres (183 mi) long. It emerged during World War I, in 1918, as Estonia declared its independence from the then warring Russian and German Empires. The border goes mostly along the national, administrative and ethnic boundaries that have gradually formed since the 13th century. The border is a subject of Estonian–Russian dispute that was supposed to be resolved with the signing of the Border Agreement, but neither Russia nor Estonia has ratified it. It is an external border of the European Union.

In September 2022, Estonia closed its borders to most Russian citizens in response to the February 2022 Russian invasion of Ukraine. On 13 September 2023, Estonia banned vehicles with vehicle registration plates of Russia from entering its territory, in accordance with a decision by the European Union. In 2025 Estonia closed access to the Saatse boot followed the sighting of armed Russian soldiers in the disputed territory.

== History ==
=== Origins of the border ===
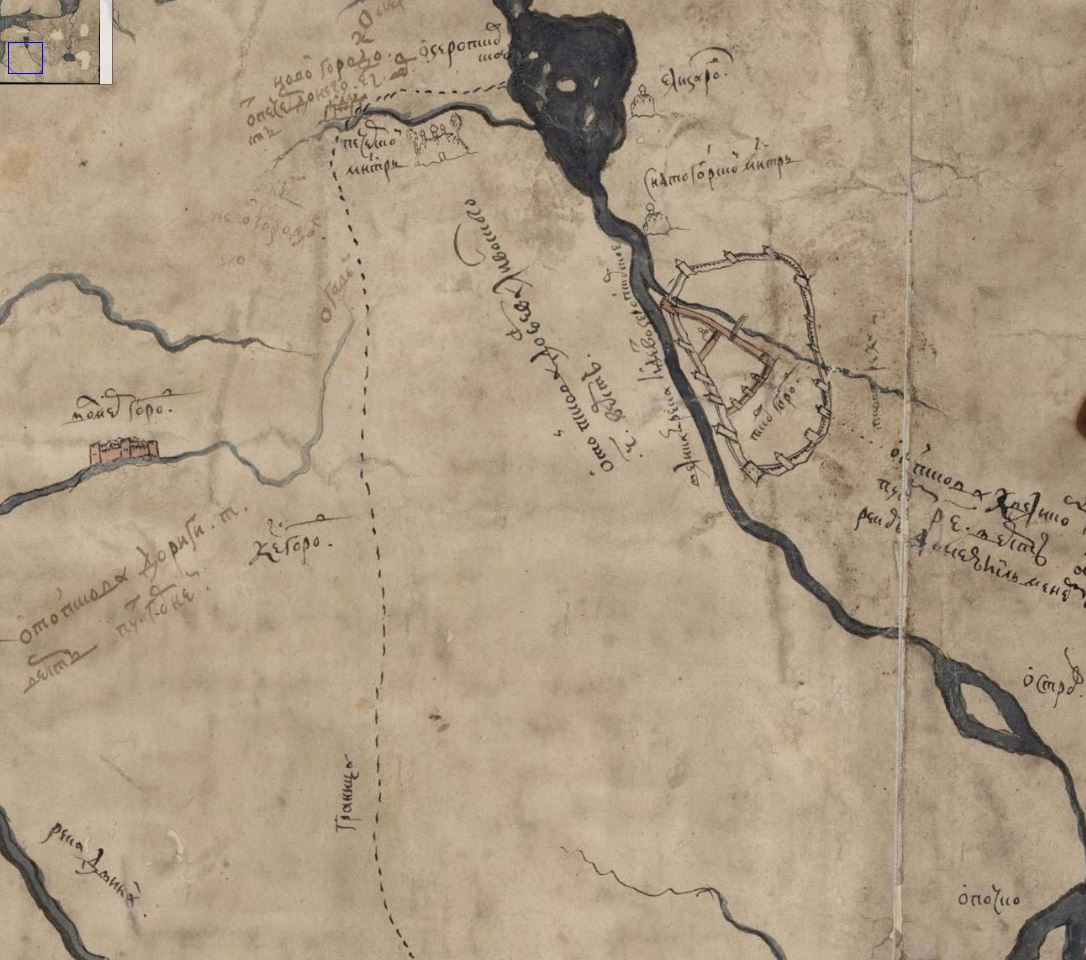
Fragment of the "Drawing of Russian and Swedish towns" (mid-17th century) showing the borderline south from Peipus (Source: РГАДА, vol. XVI, file 387)

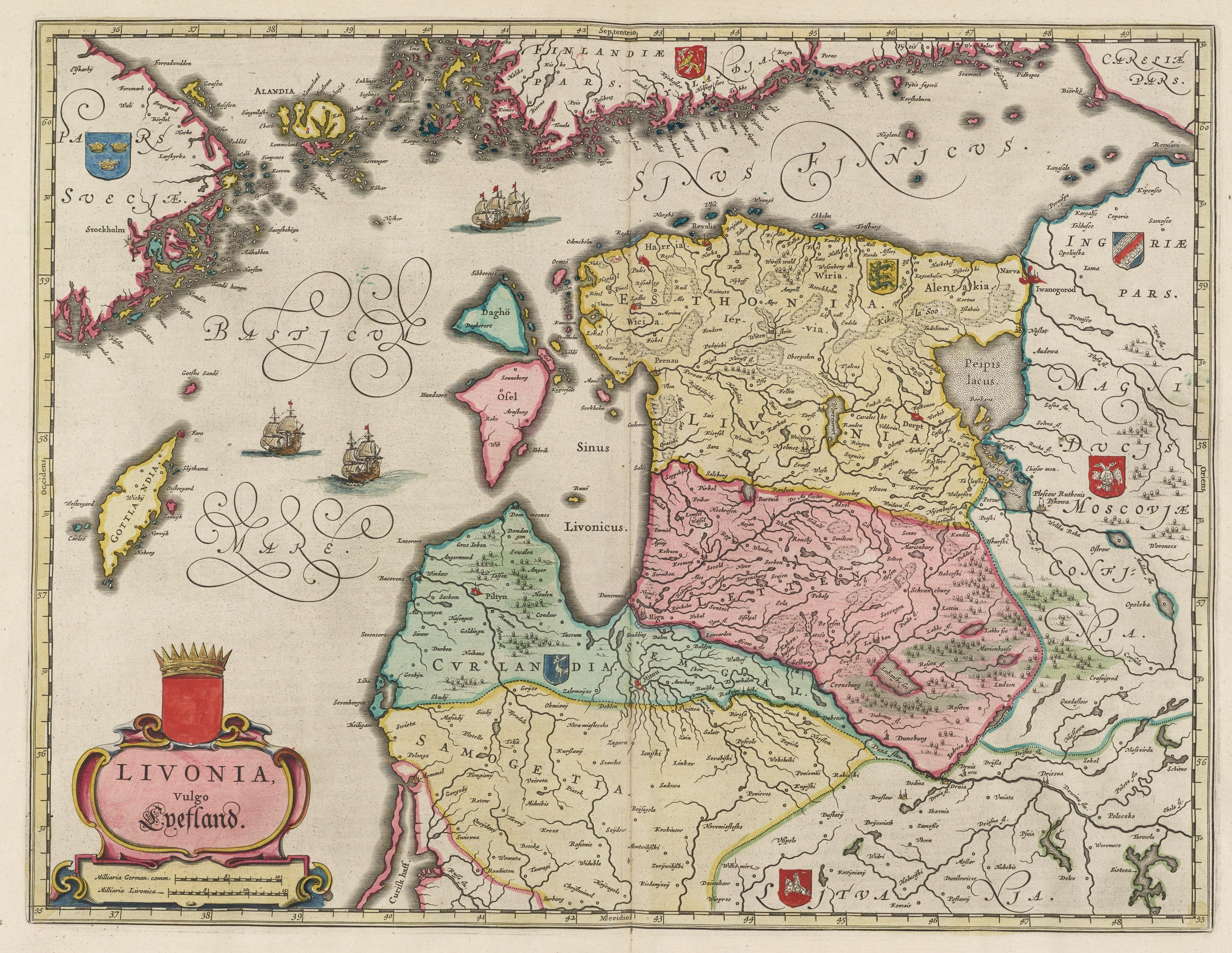
Livonia and adjacent countries, 1645

Until the 13th century no strict borders existed between the Slavic and Finnic peoples that populated northeastern Europe. Their mutual relationships relied on the military and dynastic alliances, tributes and religious proselytism, occasionally interrupted by military raids. Major powers in the region were the Teutonic Order and Novgorod Republic that encompassed Pskov, Karelia and Izhora that conducted trade i.a. via Estonian lands seeing them as tributaries. Yaroslav the Wise briefly conquered Jurjev (Tartu) in the 11th century but Estonians soon reconquered the fort. The present-day borderline between Russia and Estonia may be traced back to the 13th century when the Livonian Crusade halted on the border with Pskovian lands east of Pskovo-Chudskoye or Peipus lake basin, the Narva River and minor rivers to the south from the lake. Further campaigns of either sides have not brought any sustainable gains so Denmark, Sweden and Livonian Confederation on the western side, and Novgorod, Pskov and later Muscovy on the east established fortresses in the strategic points of the borderland which they were able to support. Examples are Vastseliina and Narva on Estonian side with Ivangorod, Yamburg and Izborsk on the Russian side. Peace treaties mostly confirmed the basic borderline along the Narva River and the lake, such as the Treaty of Teusina (1595), which left the town of Narva with Sweden. Despite the extensive cross-border trade and mixed populations of the borderlands, the law, language, religion of Russian principalities went a different way compared to their western neighbors. Livonia and Sweden used the border as means of containment of the rising tsardom, preventing craftsmen and arms supplies from western Europe from entering Russia.

=== Administrative border in Kingdom of Sweden and Russian Empire ===
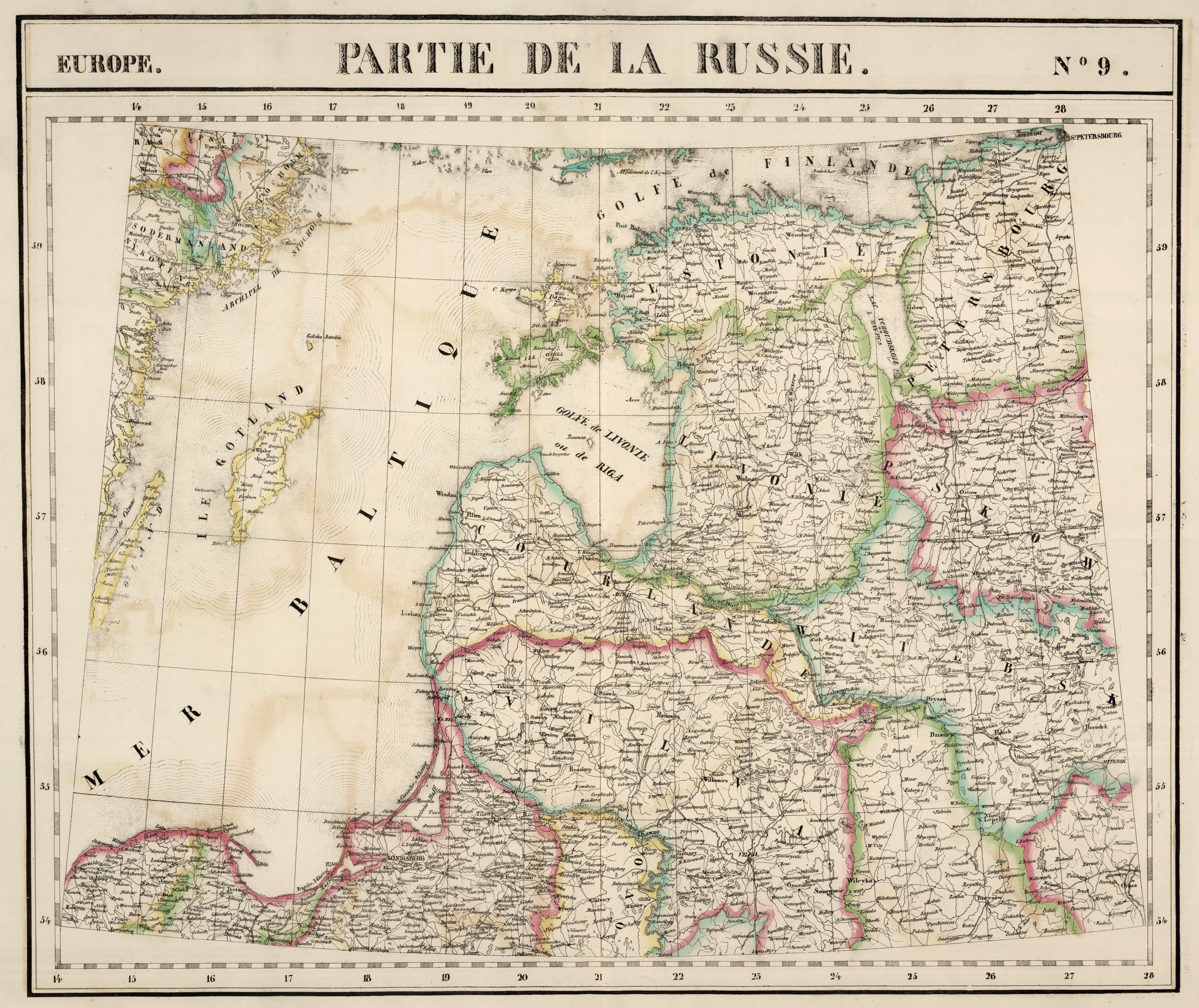
Russia. Universal atlas of the physical and political geography, statistics and mineralology, by Philipp Van Der Mellen, 1827

During the early 16th century turmoil in Russia, the Kingdom of Sweden conquered the whole Novgorodian coastline of the eastern Baltics and formed Swedish Ingria. Its border with Swedish Estonia went along the Narva River, leaving the town of Narva part of Ingria. The Livonian–Russian border south of the lake was restored. After the Great Northern War Russia regained the lost territory in the Baltics and further expanded, conquering Swedish Estonia which was incorporated as a Governorate of Estonia. However, during the two centuries of Russian rule, the eastern borders of the Estonian and Livonian governorates remained mostly intact. Like Sweden, Russia did not manage to harmonize its possessions east and west of the borderline formed in the late Middle Ages, although the migration process continued for two centuries under the Russian Empire: Russian Old Believers resettled to eastern Estonia and poor Estonian peasants to the western parts of Pskov and Saint Petersburg governorates.

=== International border between Estonia and Soviet Russia ===
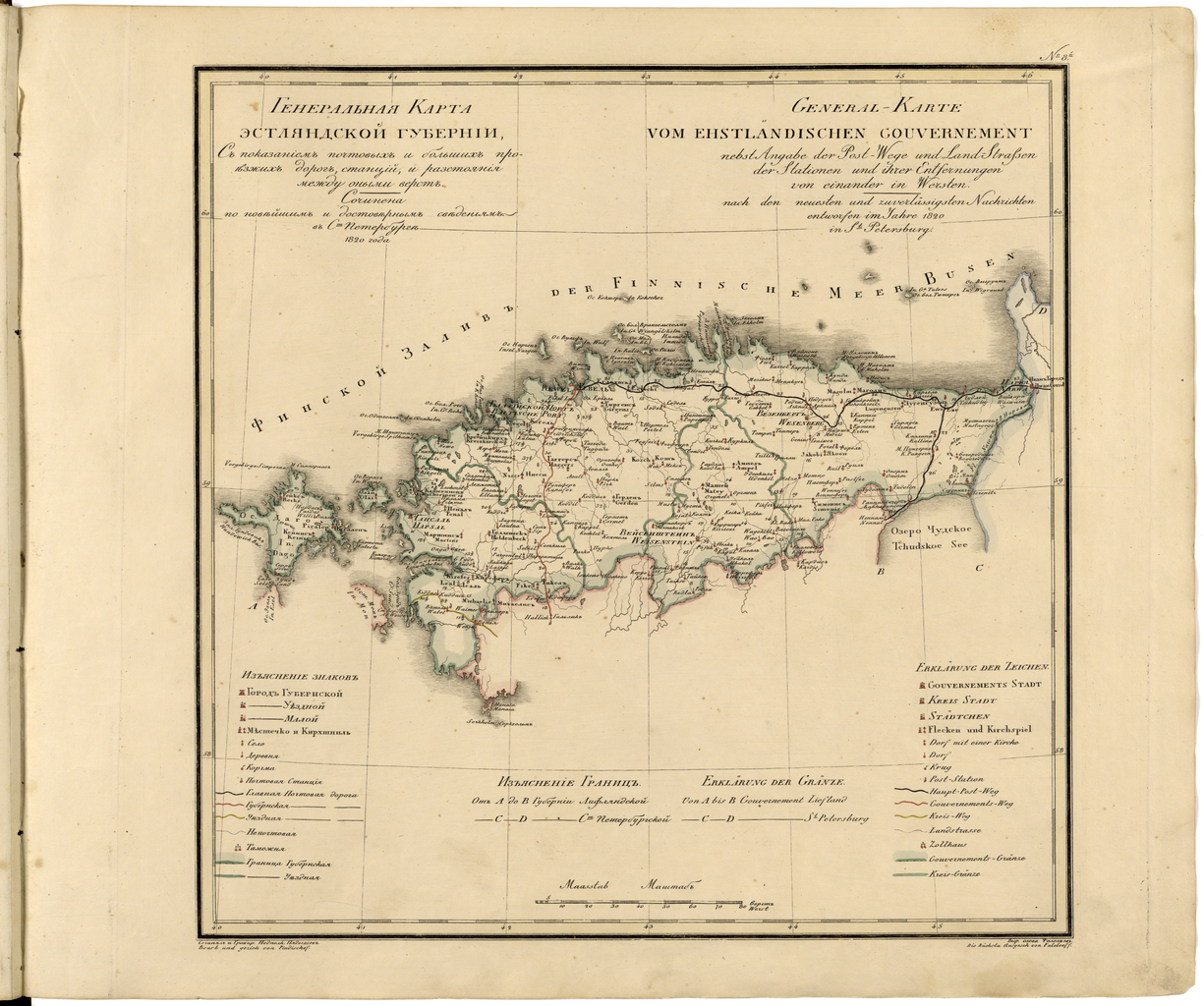
General Map of Estland Province, 1820

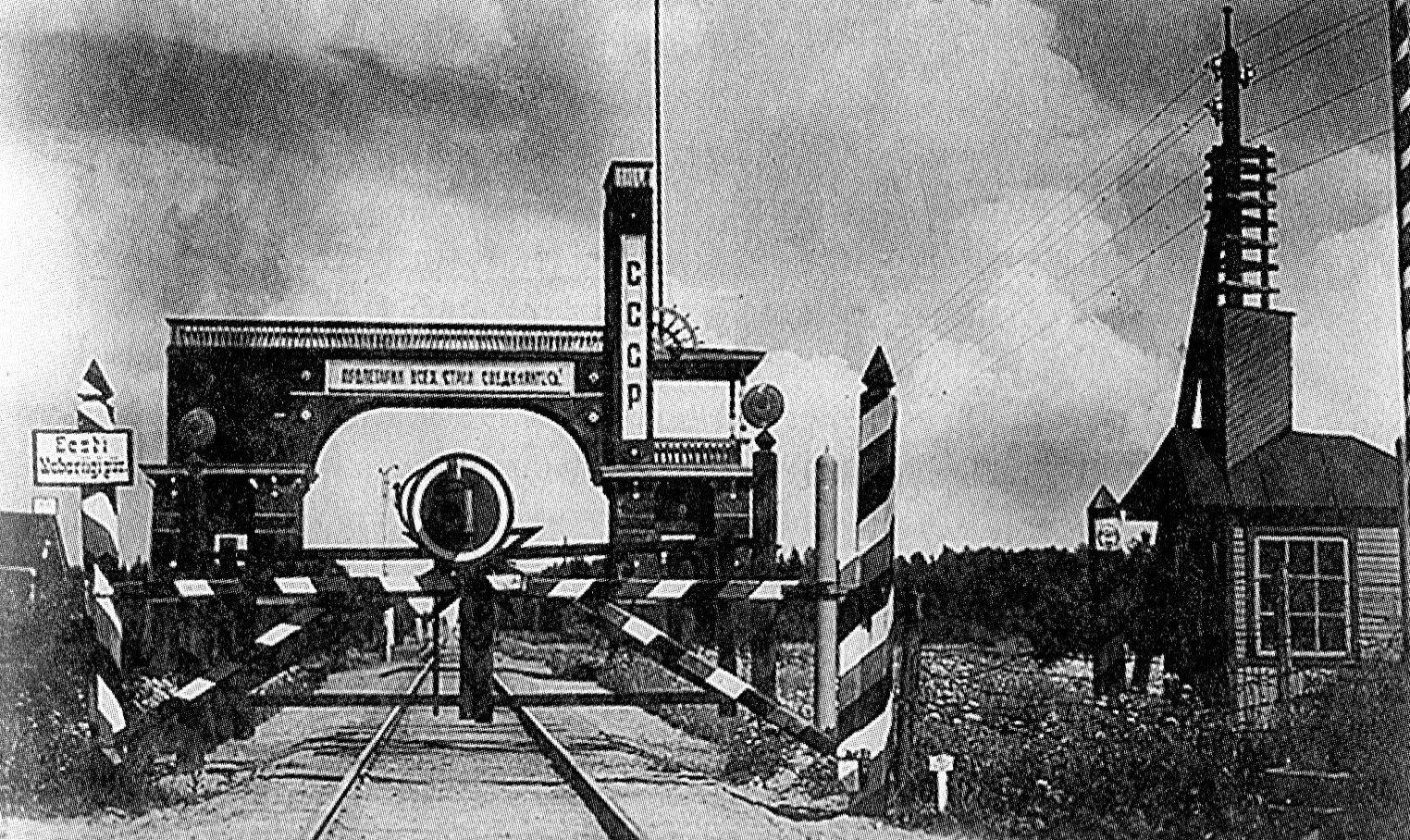
The border crossing between the Estonia (Tartu) and Soviet Union (village of Komarovka) in 1930s

On 24 February 1918, the Estonian National Council (Maapäev) declared the independence of Estonia. It listed the Estonian regions to form the Republic and declared that the "Final determination of the boundaries of the Republic in the areas bordering on Latvia and Russia will be carried out by plebiscite after the conclusion of the present World War". The plebiscite was carried out only in the town of Narva on 10 December 1917, where the majority voted for Estonian administration. The Russian Bolshevik government accepted the results and by decree of 21 December, the town of Narva was transferred from the Russian Republic to the Autonomous Governorate of Estonia.

According to the Treaty of Brest-Litovsk (1918) between Soviet Russia and German Empire, which controlled all of the Estonian territory by that time, Russia relinquished its claims to Estonia and determined that the border between the Grand Duchy of Livonia and Russia should have followed the Narva River. In late 1918, a war broke out between Soviet Russia and Estonia supported by the White Russian Northwestern Army and the British Navy. By February 1919, Estonians repelled the Red Army back to Russia and, in April 1919, the Bolshevik government initiated peace talks with Estonia. The British government, however, pressed to continue the war and in May and October 1919 Estonian and White Russian troops attempted two major offensives towards Petrograd. As both of them failed, peace talks continued and the issue of the border was brought up on 8 December 1919. The Estonian party proposed Russian counterpart to cede about 10,000 km^{2} (3,900 sq mi) from the Petrograd and Pskov Governorates to the east of the prewar borders. The next day, the Russians reacted likewise, offering Estonia to cede its northeastern part. In December 1919, it was agreed that the boundary line would go along the actual frontline between the belligerents.

The Treaty of Tartu was signed on 2 February 1920 and Estonia gained a narrow land strip east of the Narva River (Narvataguse) including Ivangorod as well as Pechorsky uezd with Pechory town and lands southwest of Lake Peipus, including the town of Izborsk. Petseri County was inhabited predominantly by Russians as well as Setos and, unlike other regions in Estonia proper, its municipal self-governance was subject to veto power by a special officer appointed from Tallinn.

Russia and Estonia agreed to demilitarize the near borderland and the whole lake basin, leaving armed only the required border guard. Border trespassing by the local population split between two countries was a common issue, raising concerns of smuggling and espionage on both sides. Soviet illegal immigrants who were ethnic Estonians were offered refugee status in Estonia to avoid their expulsion back to the USSR.

=== Post-World War II Soviet administrative boundary until 1991 ===
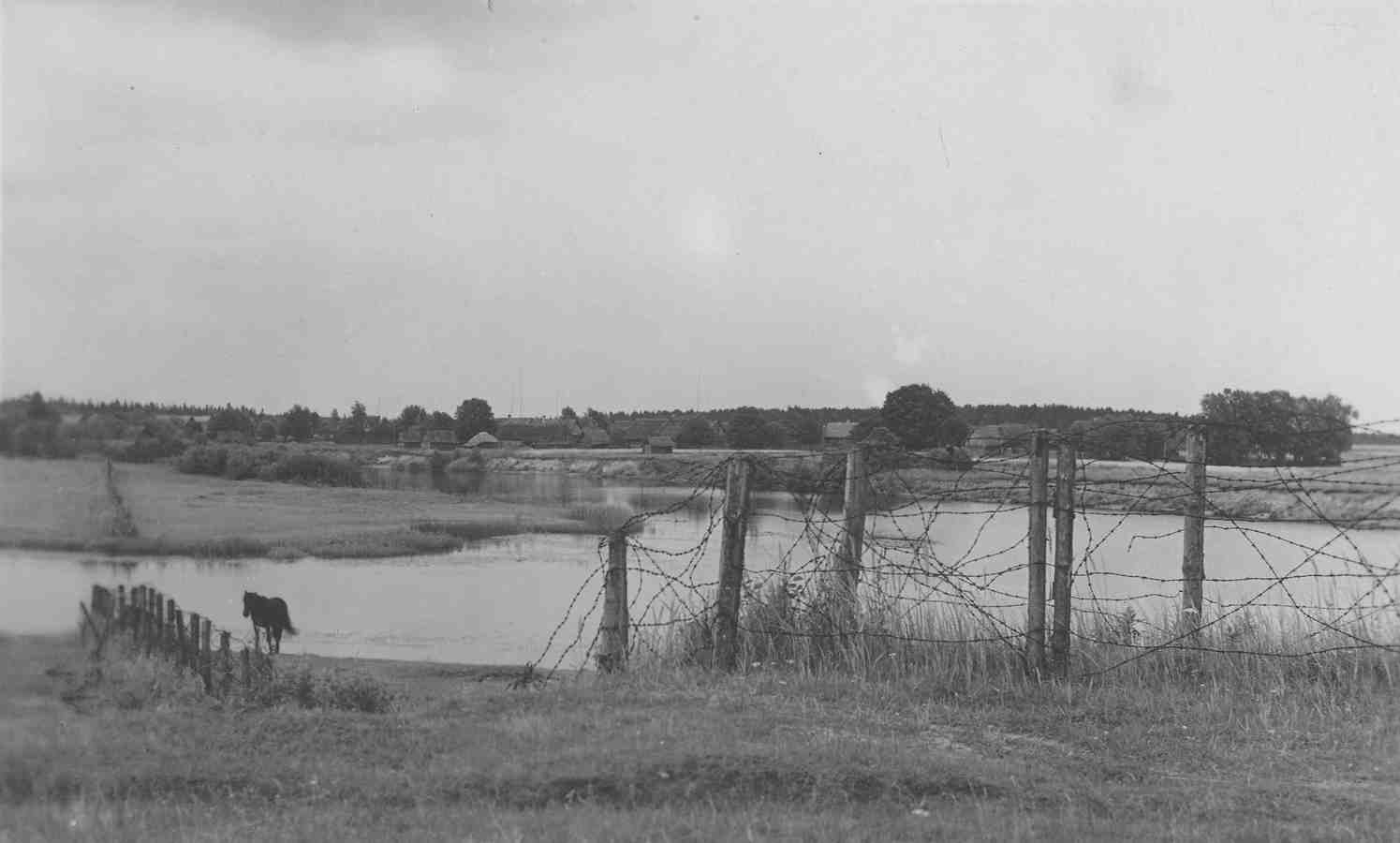
Novaya Arsiya village on the bank of Narva, 1936

Following the Soviet occupation of Estonia in 1940, the international border was converted to the administrative demarcation line of the Estonian Soviet Socialist Republic and the Russian Soviet Federative Socialist Republic. According to the Internal Affairs People's Commissariat decree No. 867 of 6 December 1940, the Barrage Zone was created along the former borderline to prevent "…intrusion of spies, terrorists and anti-revolutionary elements" into the USSR mainland. Border guards were assigned to allow restricted passage through the borderline only of the persons owning the required permission.

After the 1941 Nazi German invasion of the Soviet Union the occupied territory of the Republic of Estonia was in 1941–1944 administratively organized into Generalbezirk Estland of the Reichskommissariat Ostland. The previous Soviet-Estonian international border acted as the eastern border of Generalbezirk Estland with the German military administration area of Leningrad, where Reichsgau Ingermanland was planned, but never established.

In 1944 the Nazi German forces were driven out of, and the Soviet Union reinvaded and occupied, Estonia. On 23 August 1944, the Soviet government formally annexed the large majority of borderland areas that had been ceded to Estonia by the 1920 treaty (including Pechory, Izborsk, and area east of the Narva River) into the Russian SFSR. Other smaller Estonian gains of 1920, including the Piirissaar island in Lake Peipus, were unaffected by the Soviet administrative border changes. The city of Narva, situated on both sides of the Narva River, was administratively split into western (Narva) and eastern (Ivangorod) parts, thus replicating the border as it existed in the 16th century.

In 1957 the Supreme Soviet of the Soviet Union authorized a small exchange of territories in the administrative border area south of Lake Peipus, forming the now Russian semi-exclave of Dubki and the Estonian so-called "Saatse Boot". By that time the borders of the Soviet republics became fully transparent and no border control was enforced. Schools for Russian- and Estonian-speaking populations existed on the both sides of the administrative border. Estonian and Russian borderland areas were connected by extensive bus, rail and ferry services.

=== International border of Estonia and Russia, current state ===
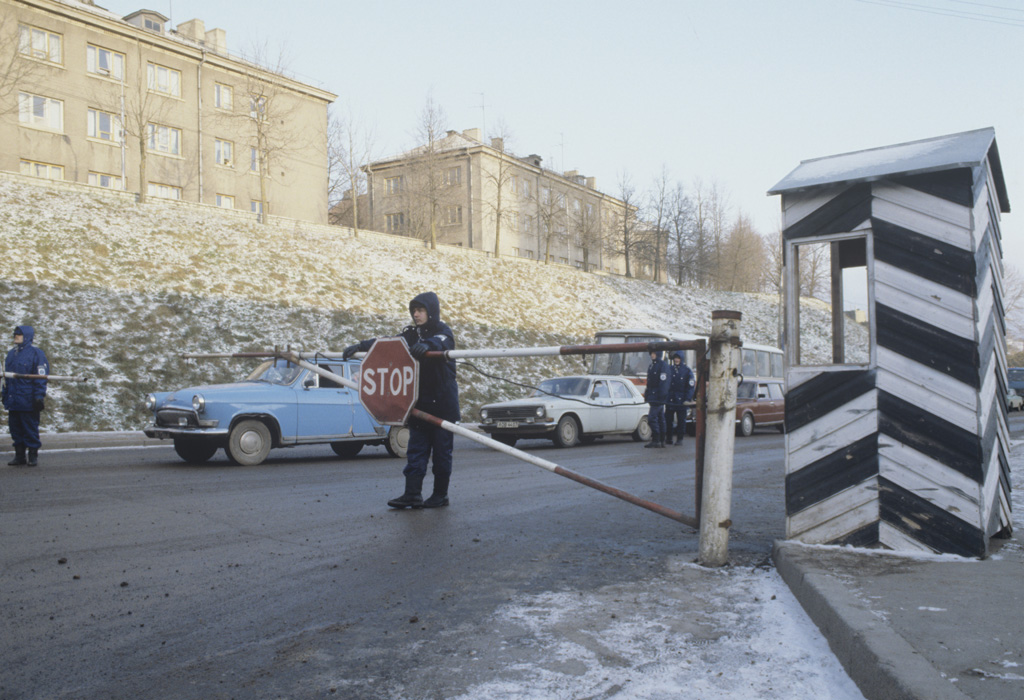
Traffic at the newly installed customs office in Narva, December 1991

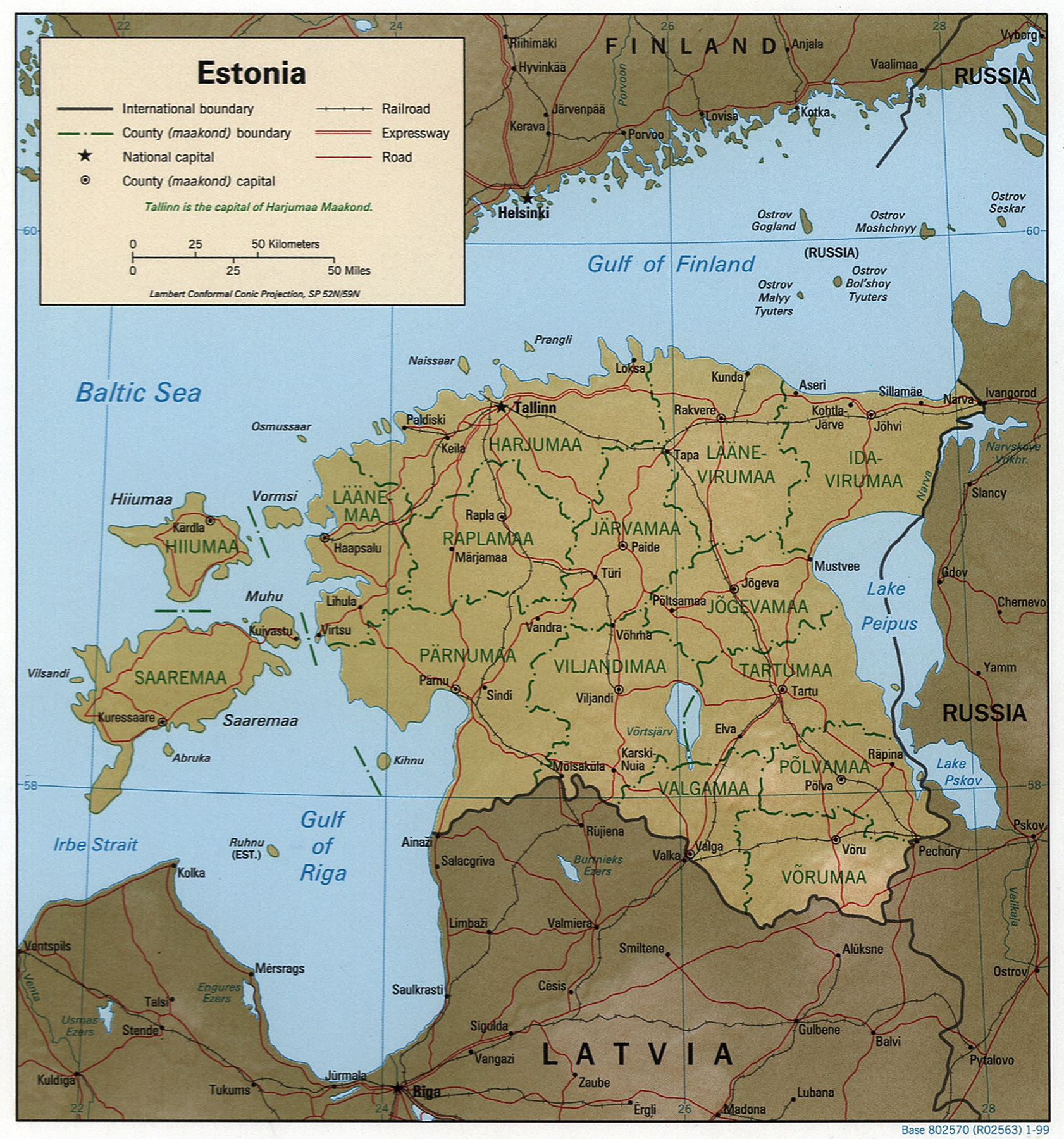
Map of Estonia, CIA, 1999

In 1991, Estonia restored its independence and the administrative boundary became the de facto international border between Estonia and Russia. However, it required formal recognition, delimitation and establishment of crossing points. Negotiations began in 1992 and Estonia argued that the border should be restored as stipulated by the Treaty of Tartu (1920). However, the Russians did not accept the references to the treaty, which was not acceptable for Estonians as that could imply that the treaty was legally void. In 1994, the border was unilaterally demarcated by the Russian authorities. By 1995 the existing border running mostly along the former Soviet administrative boundary was agreed upon. An exception was the border on the lake running closer to the 1920 border and minor territorial exchanges of 128.6 hectares (318 acres) on the land and 11.4 square kilometres (4.4 sq mi) on the lake. Inter alia, the notorious Saatse Boot was supposed to be exchanged for Marinova and Suursoo plots of land in the areas near Meremäe and Värska. In 1999 the terms of the border agreement were finalized and in 2005 it was signed by both parties. In 2005, the Parliament of Estonia ratified the agreement with the reference to the 1920 Treaty, which Russia interpreted as opening the possibility for territorial dispute and refused to ratify.

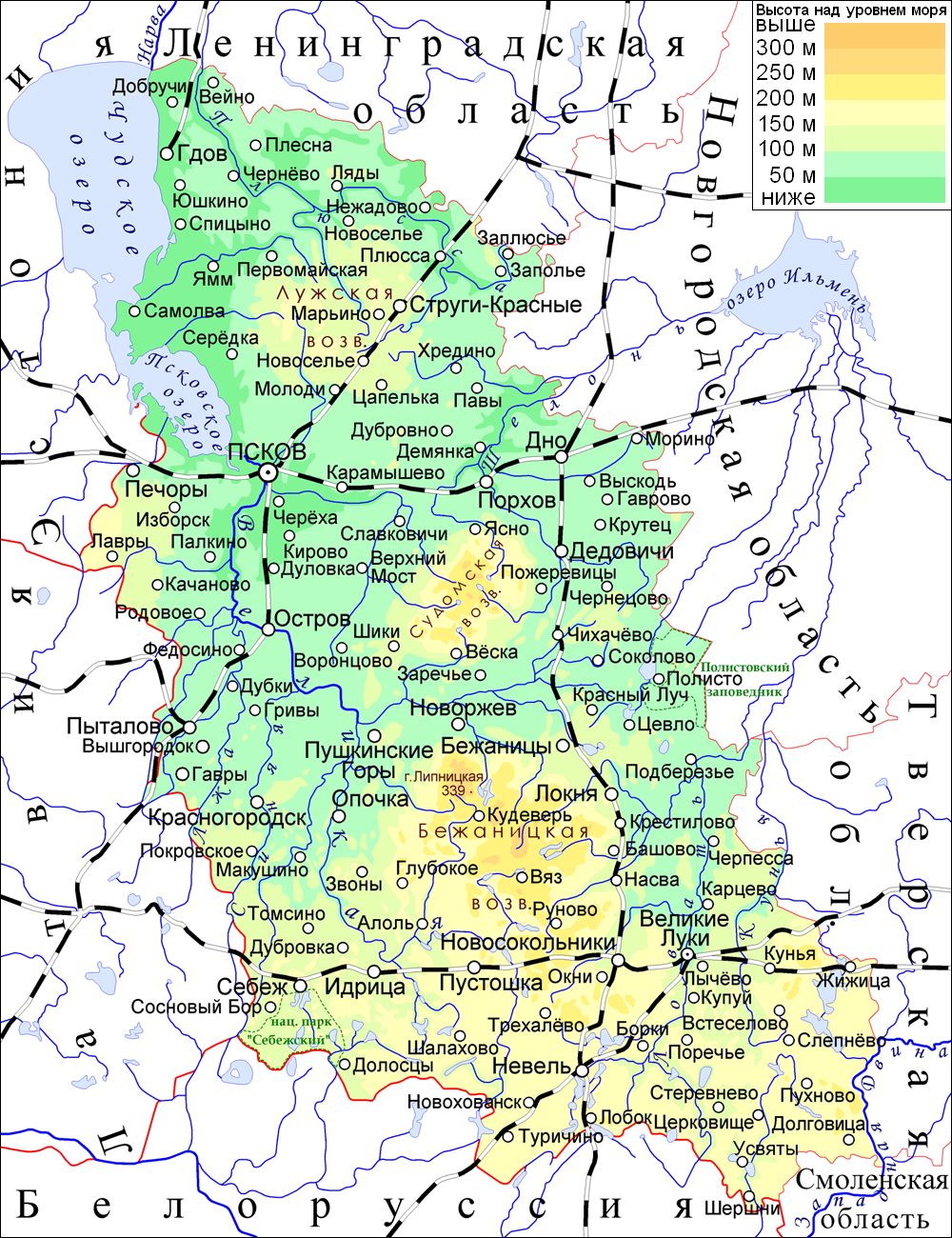
Map of Pskov Oblast (Russia)

The negotiations were reopened in 2012, and in 2014 the foreign ministers of Estonia and Russia signed the new border agreement without the disputed preamble. The treaty of the sea border across the Narva bay and the Gulf of Finland was also agreed upon. Both agreements were submitted for parliamentary ratification in Estonia and Russia; however, little progress has been made due to strained political relations. In 2017 Russian foreign minister Sergey Lavrov commented that Russia will consider ratification once bilateral relations constructively improve. In 2015, the Conservative People's Party of Estonia (EKRE) proposed to again reference the 1920 Treaty in the border agreement. In 2019, Estonian Prime Minister Jüri Ratas said he was willing to discuss ratification of the border treaty if the Russians were willing to do so, but said that Estonian coalition government must have realistic expectations, referencing differences between his Center Party and its coalition partners, EKRE and Isamaa.

As of May 2021, the treaty had not been ratified by either party. Consequently, their maritime boundary and the position of the Estonia-Finland-Russia maritime tripoint is not agreed.

=== Security increases ===
In the 2010s, smuggling (of cigarettes, migrants, and weapons) was a persistent problem along the border. Estonian and Russian border officials engaged in a measure of cooperation on border security issues, but relations were greatly harmed by the 2014 Russian invasion of Ukraine.

In 2014, the Russian government abducted Estonian Internal Security Service officer Eston Kohver while on Estonian territory near Luhamaa, and imprisoned him in Moscow's notorious Lefortovo prison. At the time, Kohver was investigating cross-border smuggling. Kohver was seized at gunpoint by a team of Russian operatives who crossed the border. Russia's claim that Kohver was arrested on Russian territory were contradicted by evidence. The incident increased Russian-Estonian tensions. Estonia, as well as other Baltic countries, Nordic countries, and European Union, expressed outrage over Russia's detention of Kohver and demanded his release. In August 2015, after being tried in a Russian court in the Pskov region, the Russians sentenced Kohver to 15 years on espionage charges; Estonia and the EU denounced Kohver's detention. The next month, Kohver was freed in a prisoner exchange, in which he was swapped for Aleksei Dressen.

After increasing tensions, Estonia increased its border security measures. In 2018, Estonia began planning for the constructing of a permanent steel fence along the 135 km land border with Russia. The first section a 23.5 km section that includes the Luhamaa border checkpoint was built between 2020 and 2022. A second section 39.5 km section was completed earlier than planned, in December 2023. Estonia also fortified its coastal defenses, announcing plans in 2020 for additional sea mines and anti-ship missiles to deter Russian aggression.

In 2021, Estonia reported five violations of Estonian airspace by Russian military and civilian aircraft. In June 2022, Estonia said that a Russian border guard MI-8 helicopter violated Estonian airspace.

In September 2022, the Baltic countries (Estonia, Latvia and Lithuania) closed their borders to most Russians in response to the Russia's invasion of Ukraine, launched in February 2022. Exceptions to the ban allowed for entry of Russian dissidents, Russians who held residence permits or long-term visas from a Schengen Area country, transportation workers and active diplomats, and Russian family members of European Union citizens. Entry for humanitarian reasons was also allowed.

On 13 September 2023, Estonia banned vehicles with Russian license plates from entering their territory, in accordance with a decision by the European Union.

On 23 May 2024, Russia removed buoys marking the border on the Narva River.

== Transit ==
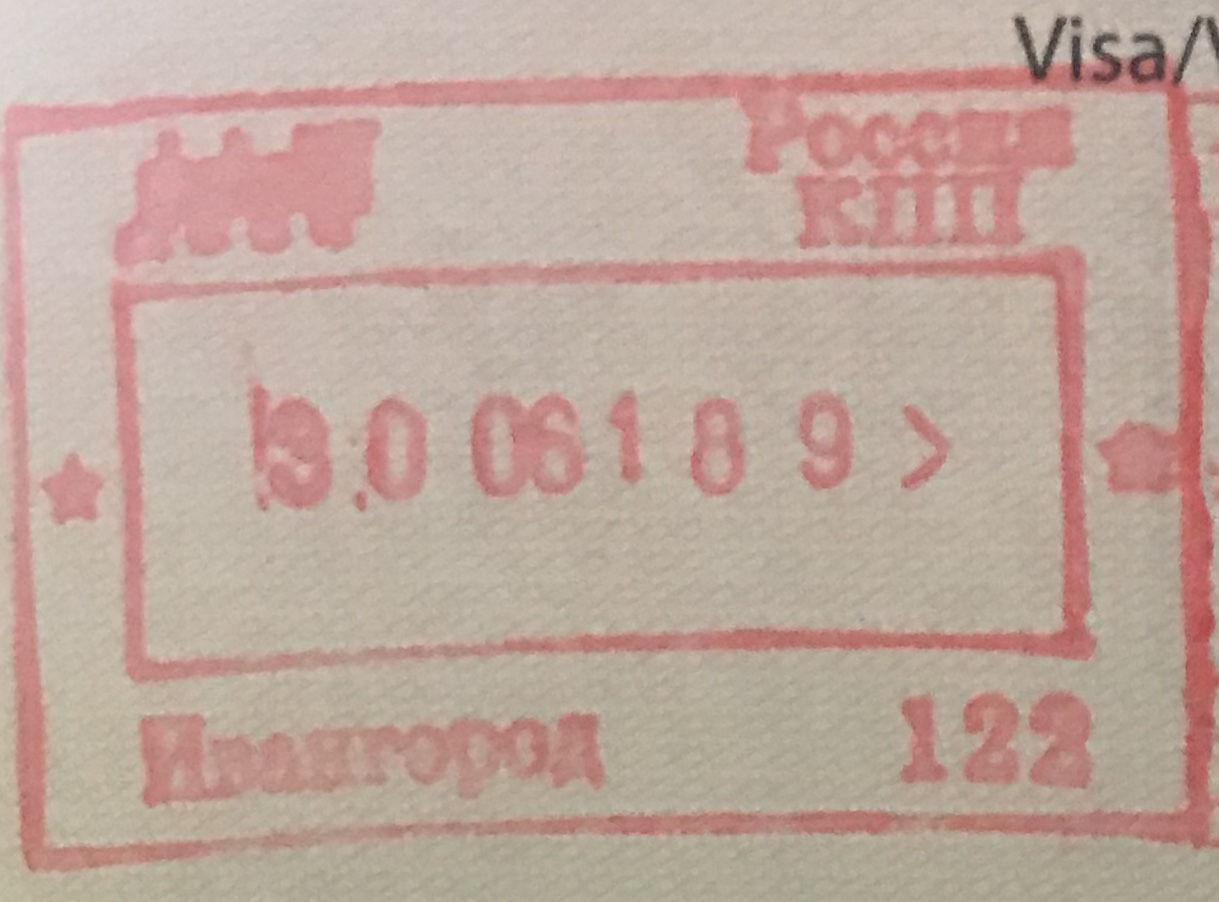
Russian exit stamp (Ivangorod railway checkpoint)

Russia has established a border security zone regime along its western borders. The 5-kilometre (3.1 mi) area adjacent to the border may be visited by the non-local population if a permit is obtained for tourist, business or private reasons. Internal checkpoints exist on the roads. Russian fishermen on the Lake Peipus and Narva River are required to give notice each time they plan to sail and to return to the harbour before sunset.

Transit to the border crossing points requires no permit. For many years, it was possible to freely cross the Saatse Boot from and to Estonia with no checks as long as no stops were made while in transit. The road was permanently closed in October 2025 after Russian soldiers were seen standing on the road, causing security concerns.

To address the issue of long border queues of passenger cars and lorries, since 2011 the Estonian side has required outbound travellers to reserve an appointment at the border checkpoint electronically or by phone. Russia planned to set up a similar system, but it did not proceed beyond testing.

In the early 1990s there was a stable arms smuggling channel from Estonia to Russia through the barely controlled border, causing severe incidents. The volume of Russian-European transit via Estonia, once essential for Russian exporters, has been declining since 2007 partly because of political tensions and partly because of the construction of the Ust-Luga sea port.

== Border crossings ==
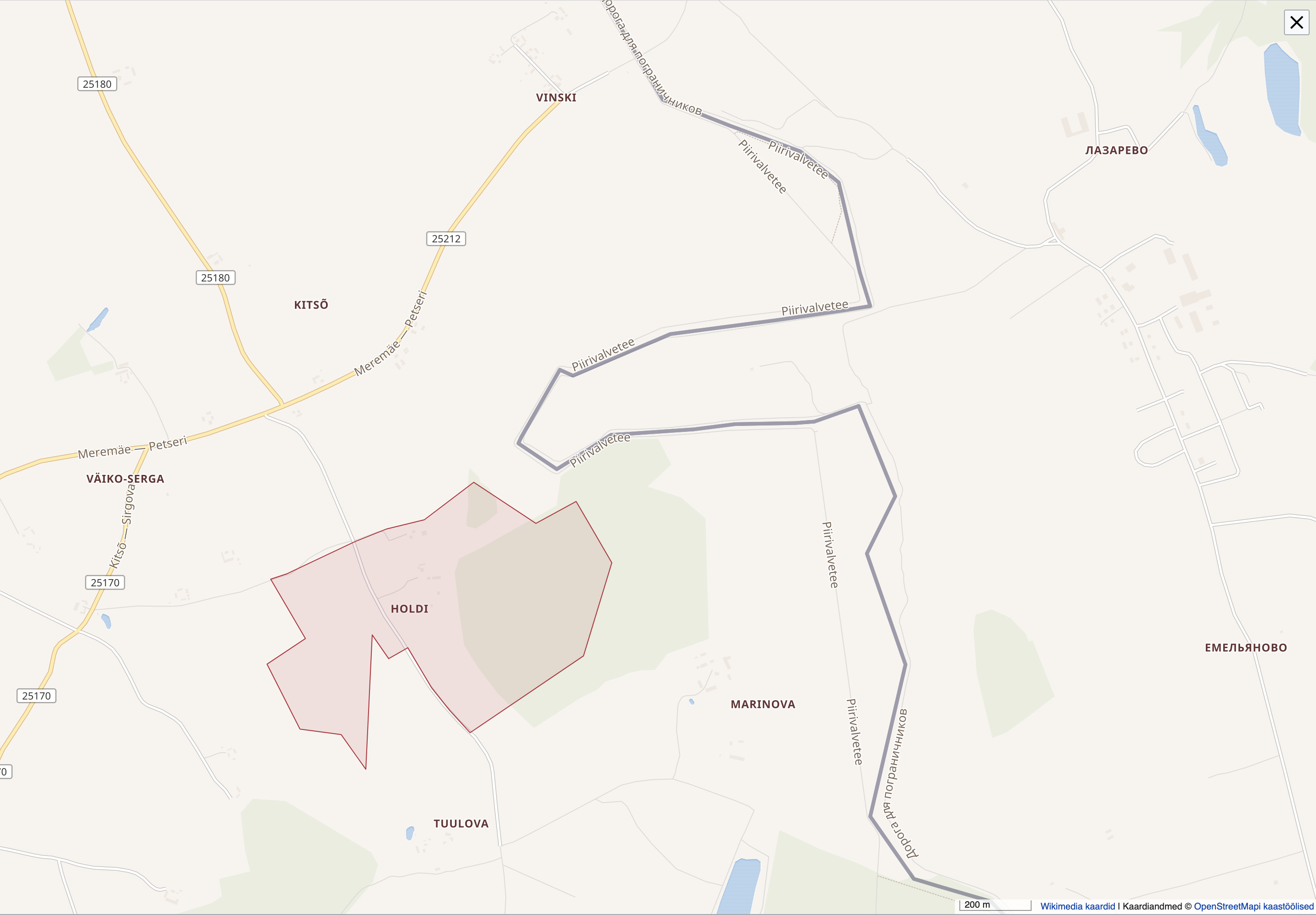
Border of Estonia and Russia in Southern Estonia, Setomaa (2025)

Crossing the border is allowed only at border controls. Most people need a visa on one or both sides of the border. Listed from the north:

- Narva–Ivangorod on road E20 / 1 / M11 between Narva and Ivangorod (for automobiles and pedestrians of any nations; closed for automobile traffic since February 2024 until mid-2026 due to the reconstruction of the border crossing station on the Russian side)
- Narva–Ivangorod on the Tallinn–Narva–St. Petersburg railway, at Narva and Ivangorod (for railway passengers; not used as of 2024 due to the absence of cross-border railway traffic)
- Narva 2–Parusinka on a local road in Narva (only for citizens or residents of Estonia and Russia; closed indefinitely in November 2022)
- Saatse–Krupp, on road 106 at Saatse (unstaffed pedestrian crossing, only for citizens or residents of Estonia and Russia)
- Koidula–Pechory on the Valga-Pechory railway at Koidula (not used as of 2024 due to the absence of cross-border railway traffic)
- Koidula–Kunichina Gora on road 63 at Koidula, near Pechory town (for automobiles and pedestrians of any nations)
- Luhamaa–Shumilkino on road E77 / 7 / A212 between Riga and Pskov, near Luhamaa village (for automobiles and pedestrians of any nations)

A checkpoint that existed in the 1990s near Pechory and checkpoints on the lake harbours are now closed.

== See also ==
- Baltic Defence Line
- Territorial issues between Estonia and Russia
- Treaty of Tartu
