= Estonian–Russian territorial dispute =

Border dispute in Europe

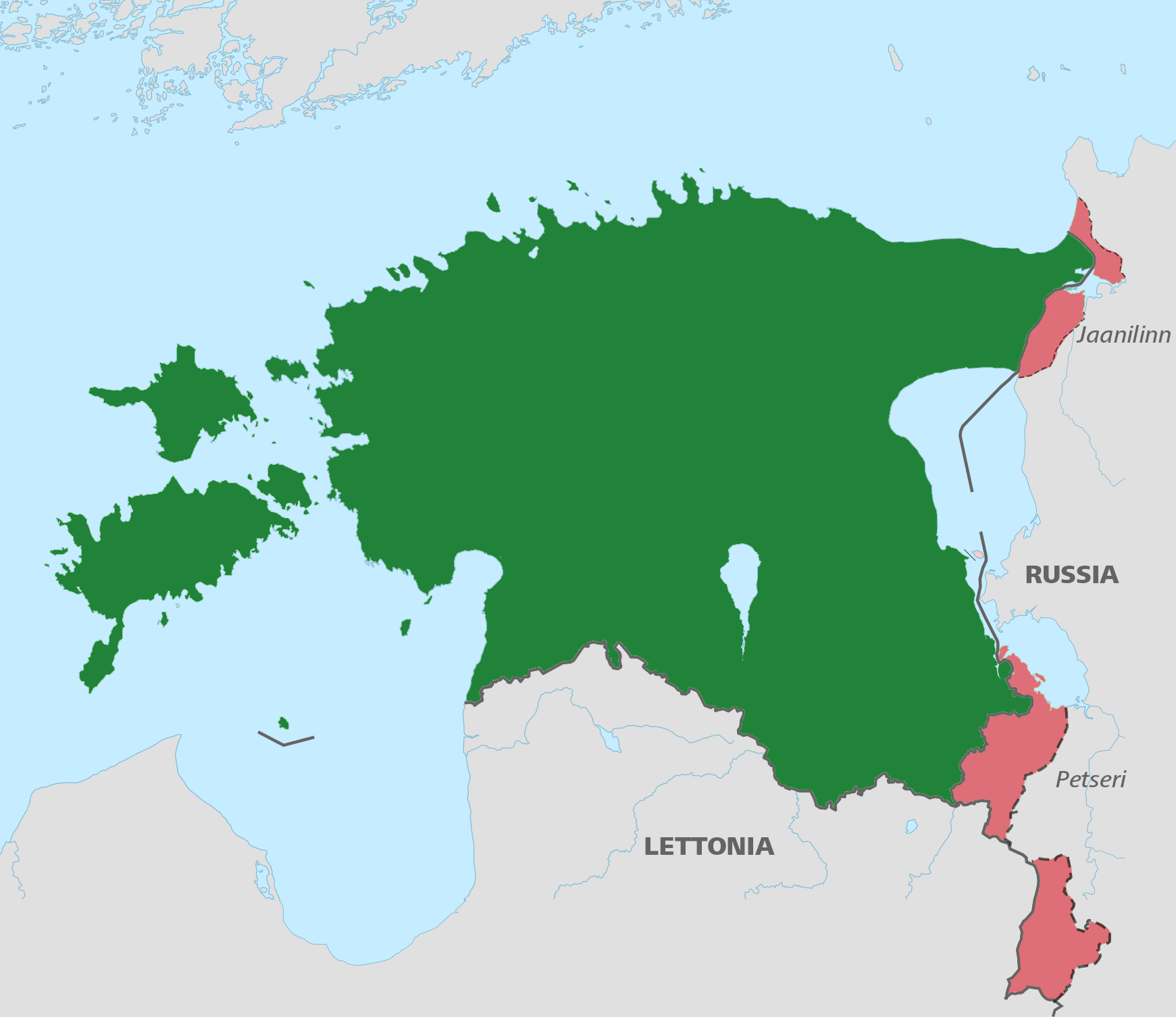
Current borders of Estonia (green). The disputed territory is marked red.

Estonian–Russian territorial disputes have clouded Estonia–Russia relations. After the dissolution of the Soviet Union, Estonia had hoped for the return of more than 2,000 square kilometers (770 sq mi) of territory annexed by Russia after World War II in 1945. The annexed land with Russian majority had been within the borders Estonia and Russia agreed on in the 1920 Tartu Peace Treaty. However, the Boris Yeltsin government disavowed any responsibility for acts committed by the Soviet Union.

== History ==
After the collapse of the Russian Empire due to the October Revolution, territorial delineation between Soviet Russia and the newly independent Estonia was determined by the 1920 Tartu peace treaty. On the onset of World War II, Estonia was annexed by the Soviet Union in the form of the Estonian SSR, as part of the overall occupation of the Baltic States. Soon it was overtaken by Nazi Germany and re-occupied by the Soviet Union for the period of 1944–1991.

== Post-Soviet times ==
After Estonia regained its independence from the Soviet Union following the Singing Revolution, Estonian and Russian negotiators reached a technical agreement on the Estonia–Russia border in December 1996, with the border remaining substantially the same as the one drawn by Joseph Stalin, with some minor adjustments. The border treaty was initialed in 1999. On 18 May 2005 Estonian Foreign Minister Urmas Paet and his Russian colleague Sergei Lavrov signed in Moscow the “Treaty between the Government of the Republic of Estonia and the Government of the Russian Federation on the Estonian-Russian border” and the “Treaty between the Government of the Republic of Estonia and the Government of the Russian Federation on the Delimitation of the Maritime Zones in the Gulf of Finland and the Gulf of Narva”.

The Riigikogu (Estonian Parliament) ratified the treaties on 20 June 2005, with a reference to the 1920 Tartu Peace Treaty in the preamble of the ratification law, placing the new border treaty in context of internal Estonian law as amending the original 1920 border, objected by Russia. The President of Estonia, Arnold Rüütel proclaimed the treaties on 22 June 2005. As the preamble of the ratification act mentioned the 1920 Tartu peace treaty, Russia interpreted this as in theory giving Estonia a right to claim some territories of Pskov and Leningrad Oblast of Russia later.

As proposed by the Russian Government on 13 August 2005, on 31 August 2005 Russian President Vladimir Putin gave a written order to the Russian Foreign Ministry to notify the Estonian side of “Russia’s intention not to participate in the border treaties between the Russian Federation and the Republic of Estonia”. On 6 September 2005, the Foreign Ministry of the Russian Federation sent Estonia a note, in which Russia informed that it did not intend to become a party to the border treaties between Estonia and Russia and did not consider itself bound by the circumstances concerning the object and the purposes of the treaties.

Negotiations were reopened in 2012 and the Treaty was signed in February 2014. Ratification is pending on both sides, with some Estonian MPs and officials opposing the ratification of the treaty. Their position is that this treaty contradicts the 1920 treaty and all decisions of the Estonian SSR were declared invalid in 1991.

The Conservative People's Party of Estonia (EKRE) strongly advocate reclamation of the areas in eastern Estonia (Jaanilinn and Petseri) that became part of Russia after the 1920 treaty.

In 2024, following Russia's forced removal of Estonian buoys in the Narva river, the Russian Federation demanded the ratification of the 2014 treaty as a pre-condition, which Estonian rejected. In the following year, the Estonian Police and Border Guard began registering citizens from Russian–controlled Setomaa as being born in Petseri county, Estonia.

As of 2025, Estonia continues to recognize the areas of Petseri and Jaanilinn as Estonian, and the border as the temporary control line.

== See also ==
- Estonia–Russia border
- Saatse Boot
- Russian-occupied territories

== Sources ==
- This section contains material from the Library of Congress Country Studies, which are United States government publications in the public domain.
