= T63 =

T63 may refer to:

- Allison T63, a turboshaft engine
- Estonian national road 63
- INS Tarasa (T63), a patrol boat of the Indian Navy
- T63 (classification), an IPC para-athletics classification for athletes with limb differences
