= Petseri County =

County of Estonia

Coordinates: 57°49′N 27°36′E

Petseri County Petserimaa
- County of Estonia
- 1920–1944 (de facto)
- Flag Coat of arms

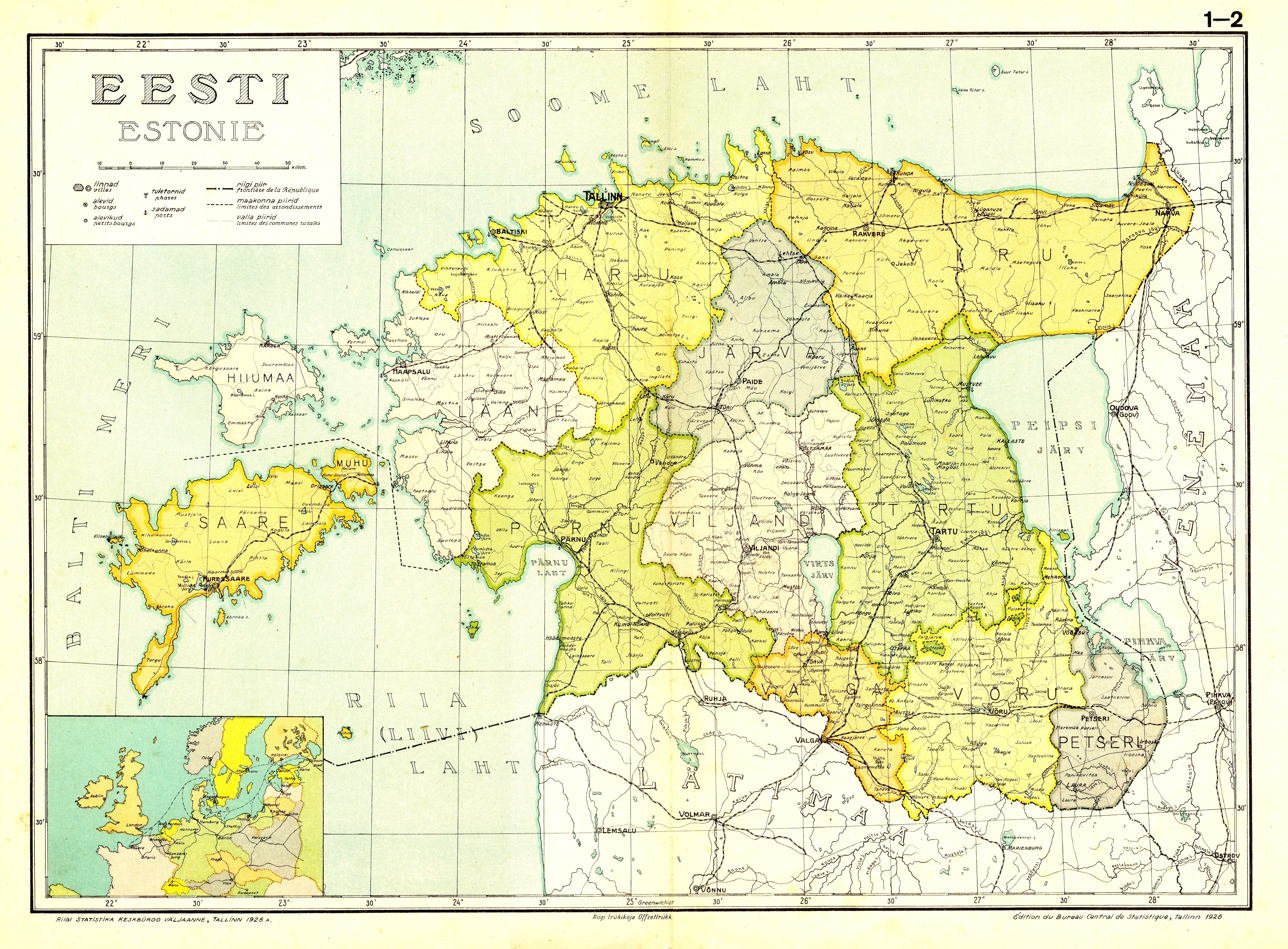
- Petseri County within Estonia in 1925 (bottom right)
- Capital: Petseri
- Area
  - 1934: 1,582 km^{2} (611 sq mi)
  - 2010: 1,251 km^{2} (483 sq mi)
- Population
  - 1934: 64,712
  - 2010: 22,123
- History
  - Established: 1920
  - Disestablished: 1944 (de facto)

Petseri County (Estonian: Petserimaa) is a de jure county of Estonia established in 1918. Since 1944, the county has been administered as part of Pechorsky District of Pskov Oblast, first by the Russian SFSR and then, from 1991, by Russia. From the perspective of legal continuity, the county was never officially disestablished by a legal Estonian government, therefore it remains a de jure county. Estonia no longer controls any territory within the disputed county, as its remainders were officially reconstituted in 2017 as Setomaa Parish and transferred to Võru County.

== Municipalities ==
There were 12 municipalities functioning in Petseri County after the 1939 territorial reform. While they were never legally disestablished, and under the principle of legal continuity, remain in existence, they are dormant in practice. The units were ignored in the 2017 local government reforms.

Rank	Municipality	Type	Population (1934)	Area km^{2}
1	Petseri	Rural	7,042	-
2	Petseri	Urban	4,274	-
3	Lõuna	Rural	-	~100
4	Roodva	Rural	-	-
5	Linnuse	Rural	-	-
6	Vilo	Rural	-	-
7	Meremäe	Rural	-	-
8	Senno	Rural	-	-
9	Saatse	Rural	-	-
10	Järvesuu	Rural	-	-
11	Kalda	Rural	-	-
12	Mäe	Rural	-	-

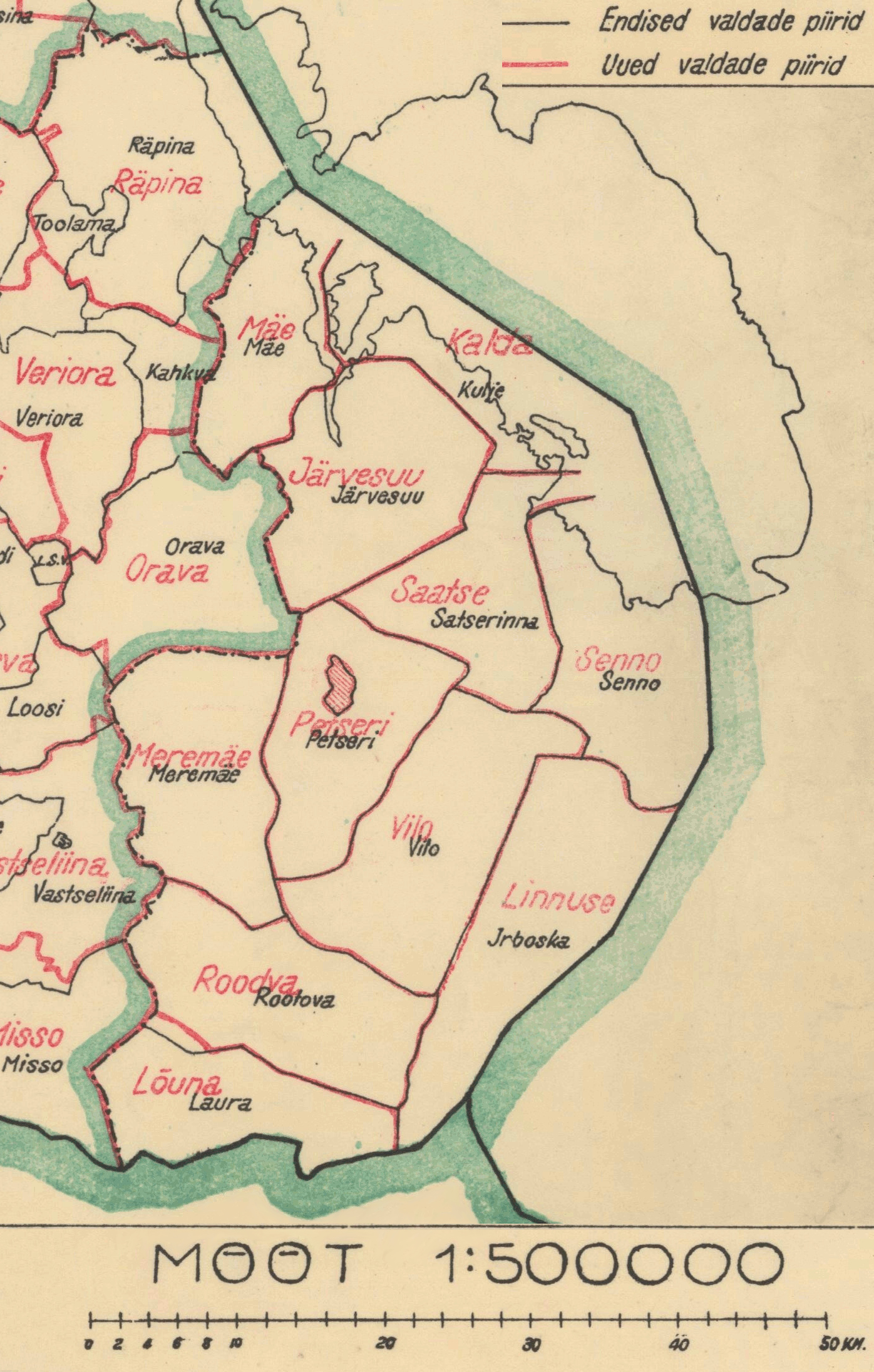
Municipalities in Petseri County (1939 reform)

Before the 1939 reform, the county was organized into four municipalities (1920-1922) and into 12 different municipalities (1922-1939).

The parishes between 1920 and 1922 were:

- Irboska
- Pankjavitsa (Panikovitschi)
- Petseri
- Lobotka (Slobodka)

The parishes between 1922 and 1939 were:

- Petseri (urban)
- Irboska
- Laura
- Kulje
- Satserinna
- Pankjavitsa (renamed Rootova in 1923)
- Mikitamäe (renamed Mäe in 1923)
- Obinitsa (renamed Meremäe in 1923)
- Järvesuu
- Petseri (rural)
- Senno
- Vilo

== History ==
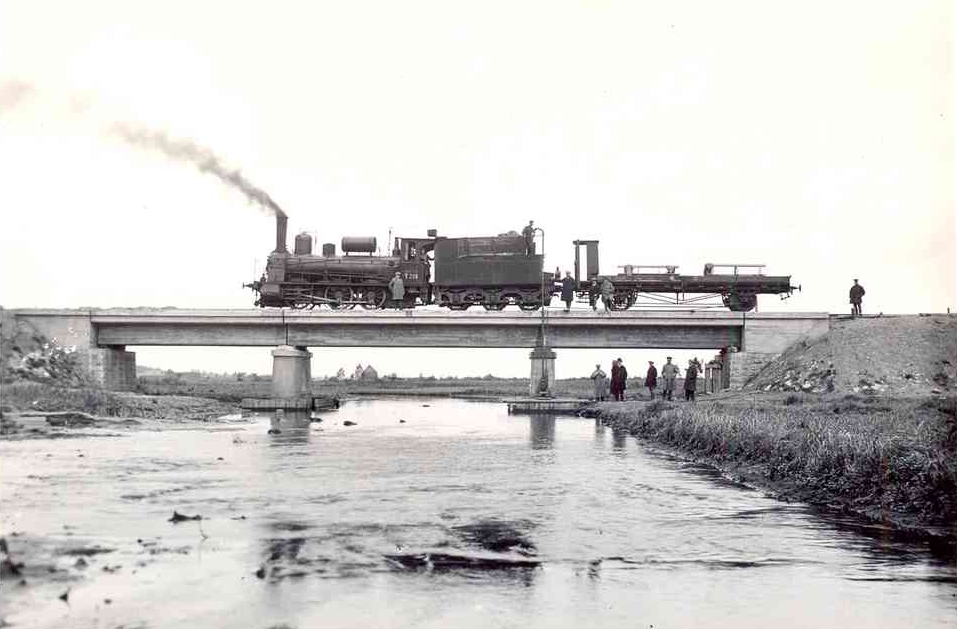
Former Tartu-Petseri railway line.

The territorial composition of the whole historic province of Petseri County (Petserimaa) is regarded as the homeland of the Setos, a Balto-Finnic people related to Estonians. The Russian inhabitants of Petseri district were mainly Old Believers who spoke a transitional dialect between Russian and the Belarusian language. In the mid-15th century one of the most important Russian Orthodox monasteries, the Pskovo-Pechersky Monastery, was founded in the area.

During the last year of World War I, from February to December 1918, the county's capital, Pechory, was occupied by German forces. (As such, the county including the town and the territory surrounding it was devised to be part of the Baltic Duchy.) The town was then captured by Estonian forces on March 29, 1919, during the Estonian War of Independence. The Treaty of Tartu of 1920 subsequently assigned Pechory and its surrounding territory, the Setomaa region, to Estonia. Pechory was renamed Petseri and the area became Petseri County. Saint Peter's Lutheran Church was built in 1926 at Petseri.

During World War II, the county was occupied by Soviet forces in 1940, by the German army between August 1941 and August 11, 1944, and again by the Soviet forces during their advance toward Nazi Germany. Soviet authorities transferred most of Petseri county from the Estonian SSR to the Russian SFSR in 1944.

After Estonia regained independence from the Soviet Union in August 1991, Estonia raised the question of a return to the borders under the Treaty of Tartu: In 1995, the country approved a technical border treaty, which separated modern Estonian territory from the disputed borders set by the Treaty of Tartu. Estonia and Russia signed the Estonian–Russian Border Treaty on May 18, 2005: the preamble noted that the international border had partly changed, in accordance with Article 122 of the Estonian Constitution.

Officially, the Estonian government maintains that the technical border treaty was merely allowing a technical modification of the de facto border lines while keeping the legal continuity of the Tartu Treaty intact. Russia, conversely, views the 1920 treaty as entirely defunct.

== Demographics ==
Modern Pechorsky District within Pskov Oblast, Russia (corresponding to the modern claimed borders of Petseri county)

In 1934, the borders of the original Petseri county had a population of 64,712 people. In 2010, the territory of Pechorsky District (corresponding to the remainder of Estonia's claim on Petseri county, excluding the Setomaa parish) was 22,123 people.

== See also ==
- Estonia–Russia border
- Estonian–Russian territorial dispute
- Pechory
- Pechorsky District
- Setos, Setomaa
