= Koidula, Setomaa Parish =

Village in Estonia

Koidula
- village
- Location in Estonia
- Coordinates: 57°50′18″N 27°35′40″E
- Country: Estonia
- County: Võru County
- Municipality: Setomaa Parish

Population (01.01.2011)
  - Total: 1

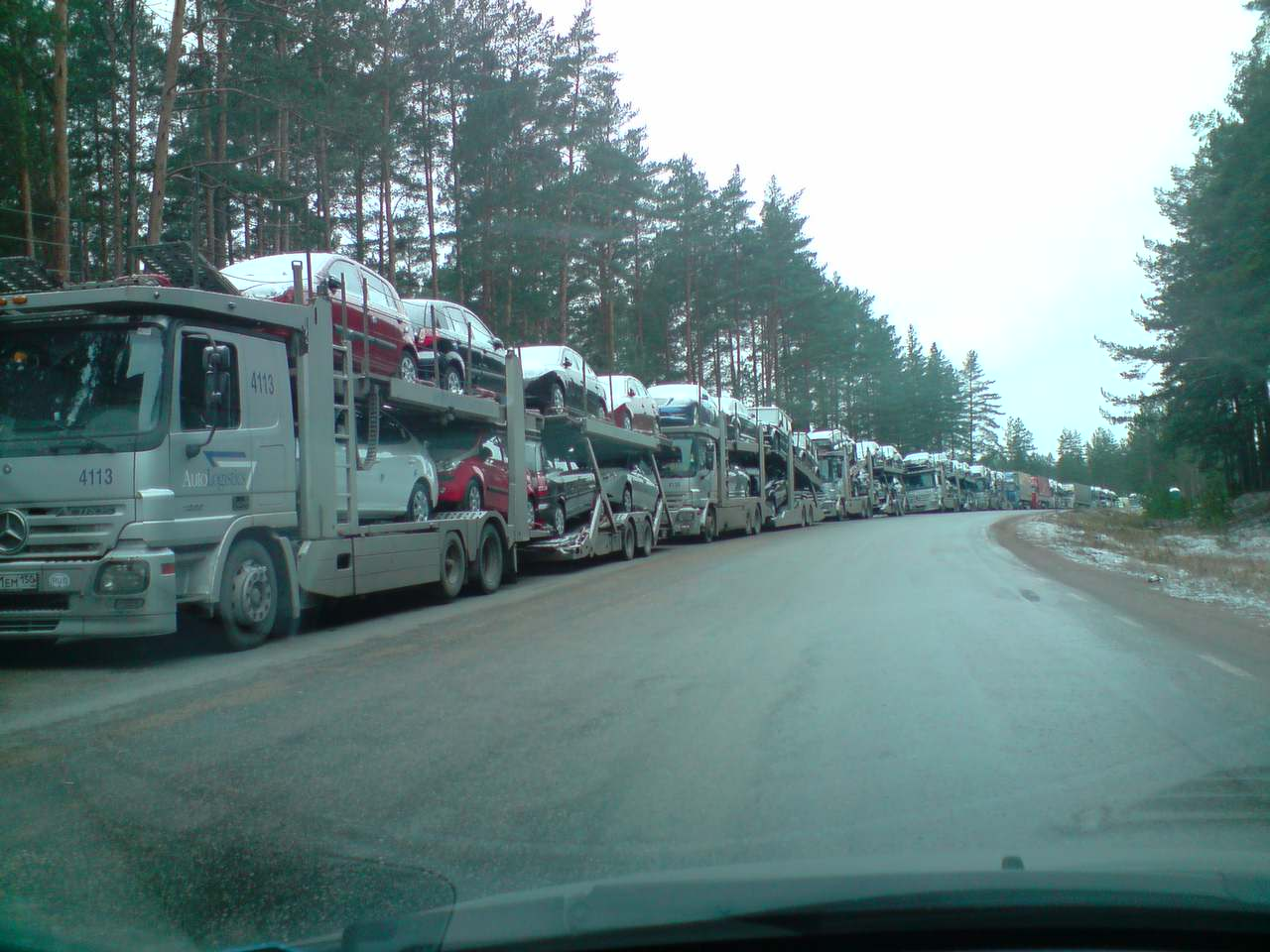
Border queue in Koidula

Koidula is a village in Setomaa Parish, Võru County, in southeastern Estonia, on the border with Russia. It is located a few kilometers northwest of the Russian town of Pechory. Koidula is the border crossing point for road no. 63 from Karisilla to Pechory, and for the Tartu–Pechory and Valga–Pechory railways. Currently only the Tartu–Pechory line is open to freight traffic, and the Valga–Pechory line is inactive. In 2011, a new railway station was built in the neighbouring village of Matsuri. This made traffic possible between the Tartu–Pechory and Valga–Pechory lines without crossing the Russian border. It is also theoretically possible to use it for traffic between Saint Petersburg and Riga.

Prior to the administrative reform of 2017, Koidula was part of Värska Parish in Põlva County.

Koidula has only 1 inhabitant (as of 1 January 2011).
