= Alfred Hirv =

Estonian painter

- Born: Pechory, Russia
- Died: Pskov, Russia

Alfred Hirv (26 March 1880 – 26 May 1918) was an Estonian painter, known especially for his still lifes. For a time he studied with Julius von Klever in Saint Petersburg; further studies took him to Rome and Munich, where he studied at the school of Anton Ažbe. His paintings are reminiscent of the style of the Dutch Golden Age. Works by Hirv can be found in the Art Museum of Estonia.

== Gallery ==
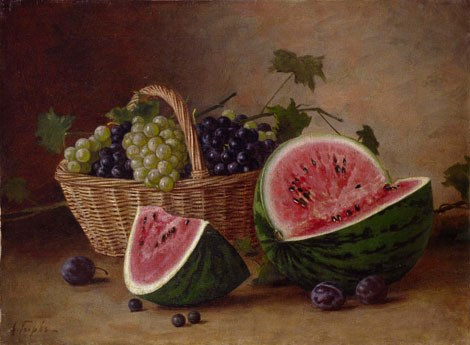
Still life (1910s)

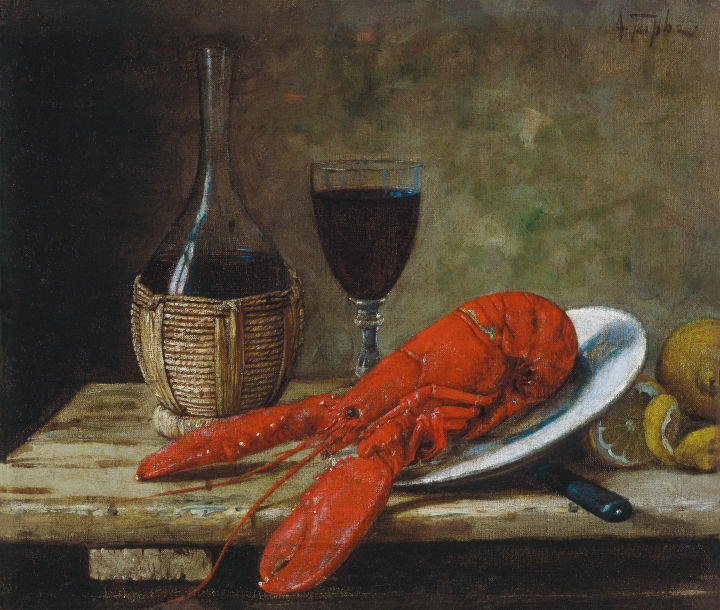
Still life with crayfish (1910s)

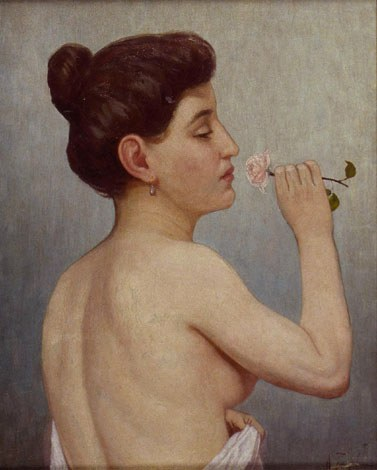
Nude with a rose (1900s)

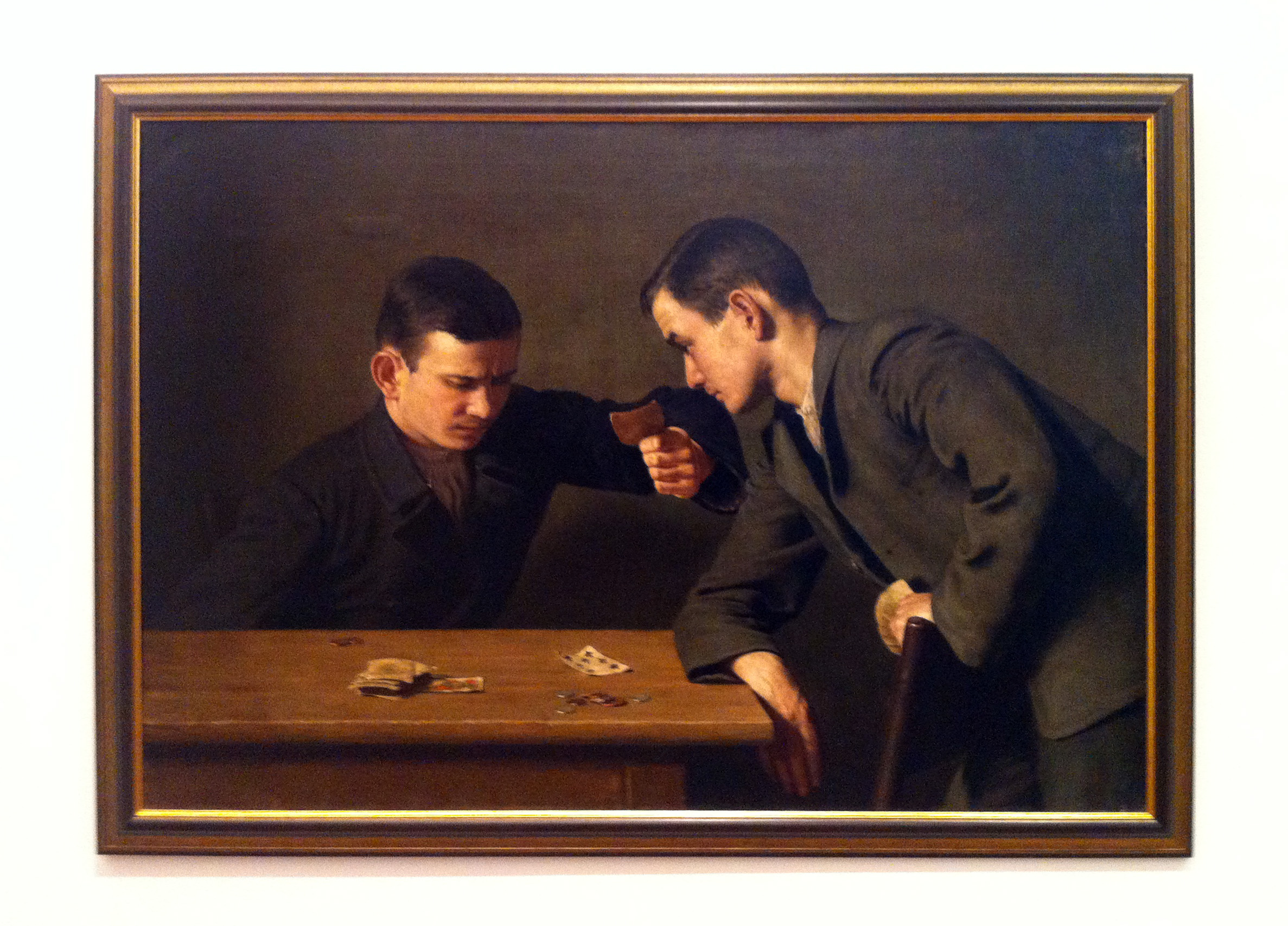
Card-players (Salary) (1910)
