= Pechory =

Town in Pskov Oblast, Russia

Pechory Печоры Petseri (Estonian)
- Town
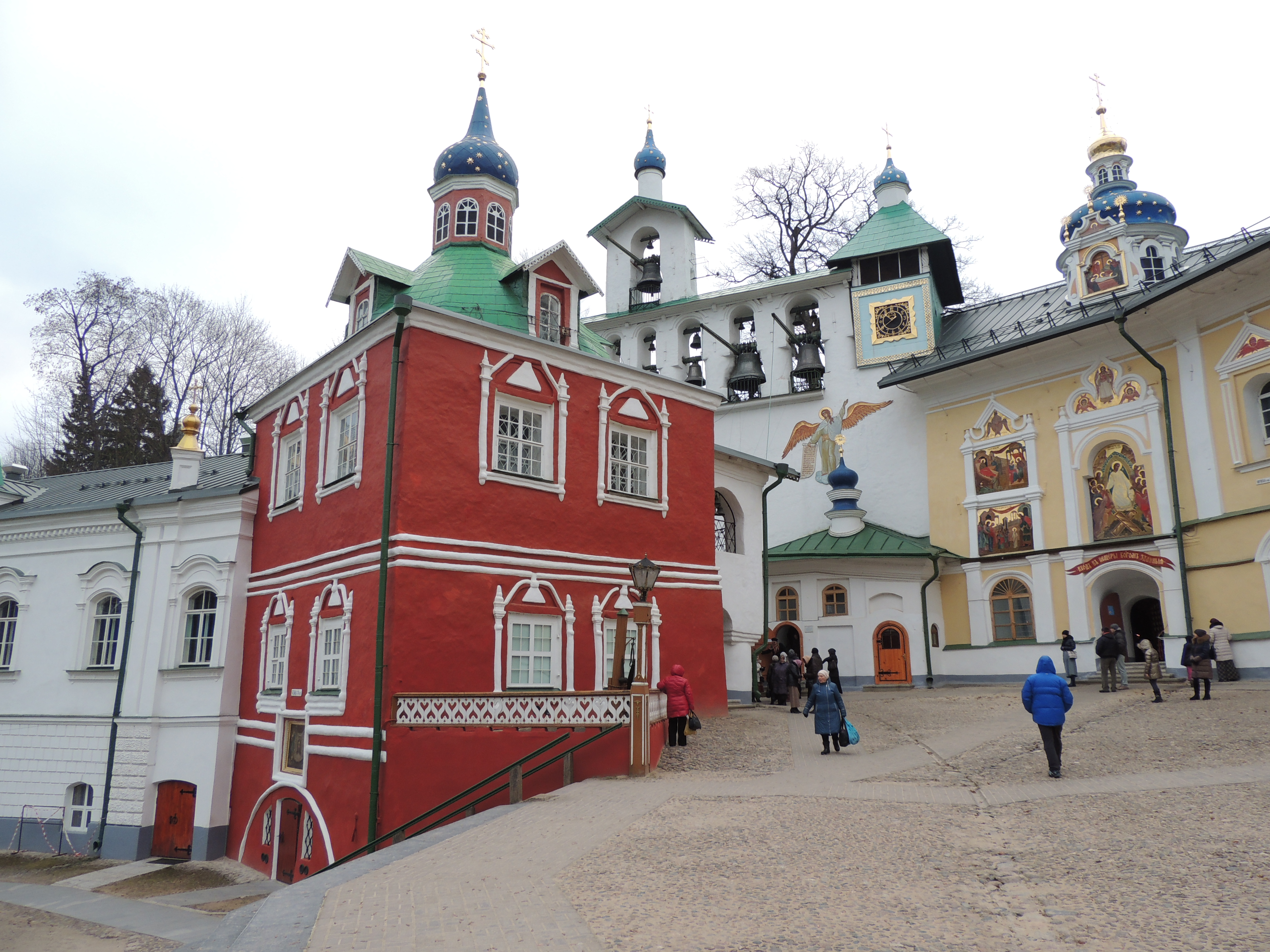
- Pechory Monastery

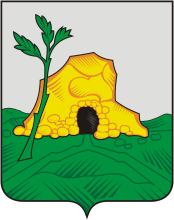
- Coat of arms
- Interactive map of Pechory
- Location of Pechory Pechory (Pskov Oblast)
- Coordinates: 57°49′N 27°37′E
- Country: Russia
- Federal subject: Pskov Oblast
- Administrative district: Pechorsky District
- Founded: 16th century
- Town status since: 1776
- Elevation: 85 m (279 ft)

Population (2010 Census)
  - Total: 11,195
  - Estimate (1 January 2023): 9,808 (−12.4%)

Administrative status
  - Capital of: Pechorsky District

Municipal status
  - Municipal district: Pechorsky Municipal District
  - Urban settlement: Pechory Urban Settlement
  - Capital of: Pechorsky Municipal District, Pechory Urban Settlement
- Time zone: UTC+3 (MSK)
- Postal codes: 181500, 181502
- OKTMO ID: 58640101001

Pechory (Russian: Печоры; Estonian and Seto: Petseri) is a town and the administrative centre of Pechorsky District in the Pskov Oblast, Russia. Its population in the 2010 Census was 11,195, having fallen from 13,056 recorded in the 2002 Census and 11,935 in the 1989 Census.

== History ==
Pechory was founded as a posad in the 16th century near the Pskov-Caves Monastery established in 1473 by the Orthodox priest Jonah, who fled Dorpat (now Tartu) for the Pskov Republic. Its name, Pechory, or earlier Pechery derives from the word peshchery (пещеры), Russian for caves. The site soon developed into an important trading post and border stronghold. During the campaign of oprichnina introduced by Ivan the Terrible, Pechory remained within zemschina, or regular municipal lands subject to the rule of the government. It was besieged numerous times by Russia's enemies: Stephen Báthory's forces sacked the settlement during the Siege of Pskov in 1581–1582, and the Swedes or Polish stormed Pechory in 1592, 1611, 1615, and 1630, and from 1655 to 1657. The fortification of Pechory was besieged by Swedes in the course of the Great Northern War in 1701 and 1703. In 1701, after an unsuccessful Swedish assault led by Shlippenbach, Boris Sheremetev began his campaign of advancing into Swedish Estonia from Pechory. After the war the Russian border was shifted westwards so Pechory lost its military significance.

In the course of the administrative reform carried out in 1708 by Peter the Great, the area was included into the Ingermanland Governorate (known since 1710 as the Saint Petersburg Governorate). In 1727, the separate Novgorod Governorate was split off and in 1772, the Pskov Governorate was established; it existed as Pskov Viceroyalty between 1777 and 1796. In 1776, Pechory was granted town rights and the Pechorsky Uyezd was established. However, in 1797, the uyezd was abolished and the territory became a part o f the Pskovsky Uyezd of the Pskov Governorate. From then on, Pechory was formally considered as a suburb of Pskov, however retaining its former rights of self-administration.

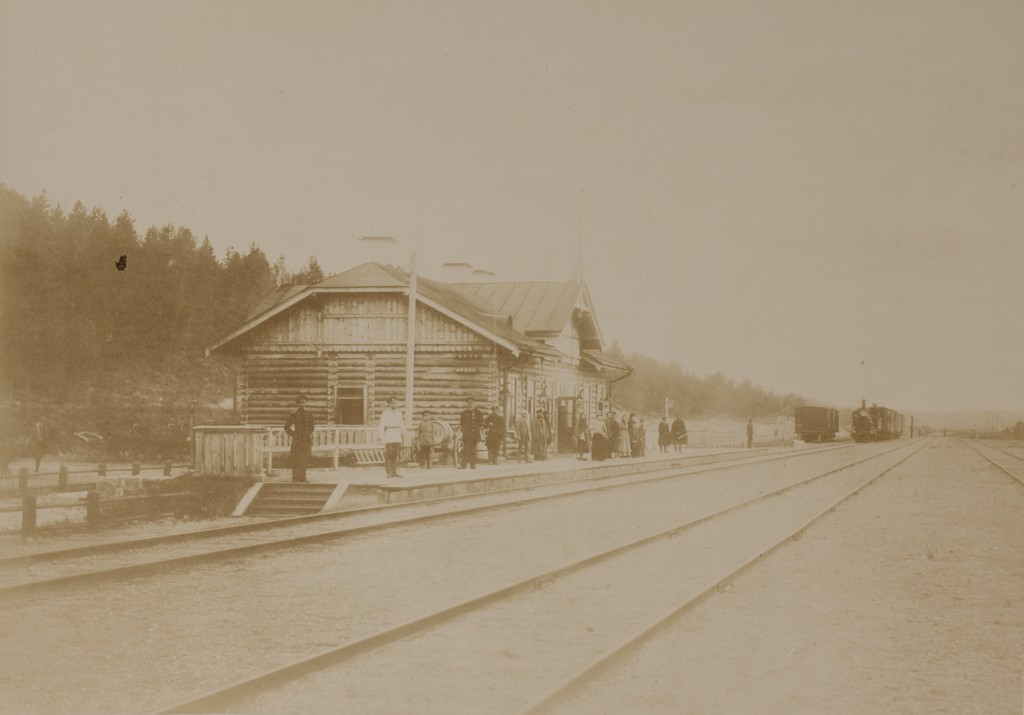
Train station in 1889

In 1820 it had a population of 1,312, including 1,258 Russians and 27 Estonians, living in 228 predominantly wooden houses. By 1914 the population grew to 2,240, residing along eleven streets and five squares. The streets were equipped with 31 kerosene street lights. In 1889, the Pskov-Riga railroad that went through the northern outskirts of Pechory was commissioned. The Pechory railway station (now Pechory-Pskovskiye) was opened in 1899. There were leather and malt factories in the town, a postal and telegraph station, four schools including one maintained by the monastery, and a hospital. Pechory was known for its flax trade, that was further expanded during the consequent Estonian period of the town's history.

From 25 February to 30 November 1918, Pechory was occupied by the Germans. During the Estonian War of Independence and, simultaneously, the Russian Civil War, the town was occupied by the Estonian army on March 29, 1919. The centre of the Governorate, Pskov, was occupied by the anti-Bolshevik Russian Northwestern Army, that was later in August 1919 repelled back by the Red Army. Under the terms of the 1920 Tartu Peace Treaty that stipulated the border along the actual front line between the Soviet Russian and Estonian armies, so Pechory and the adjacent parts of Setomaa were ceded to Estonia.

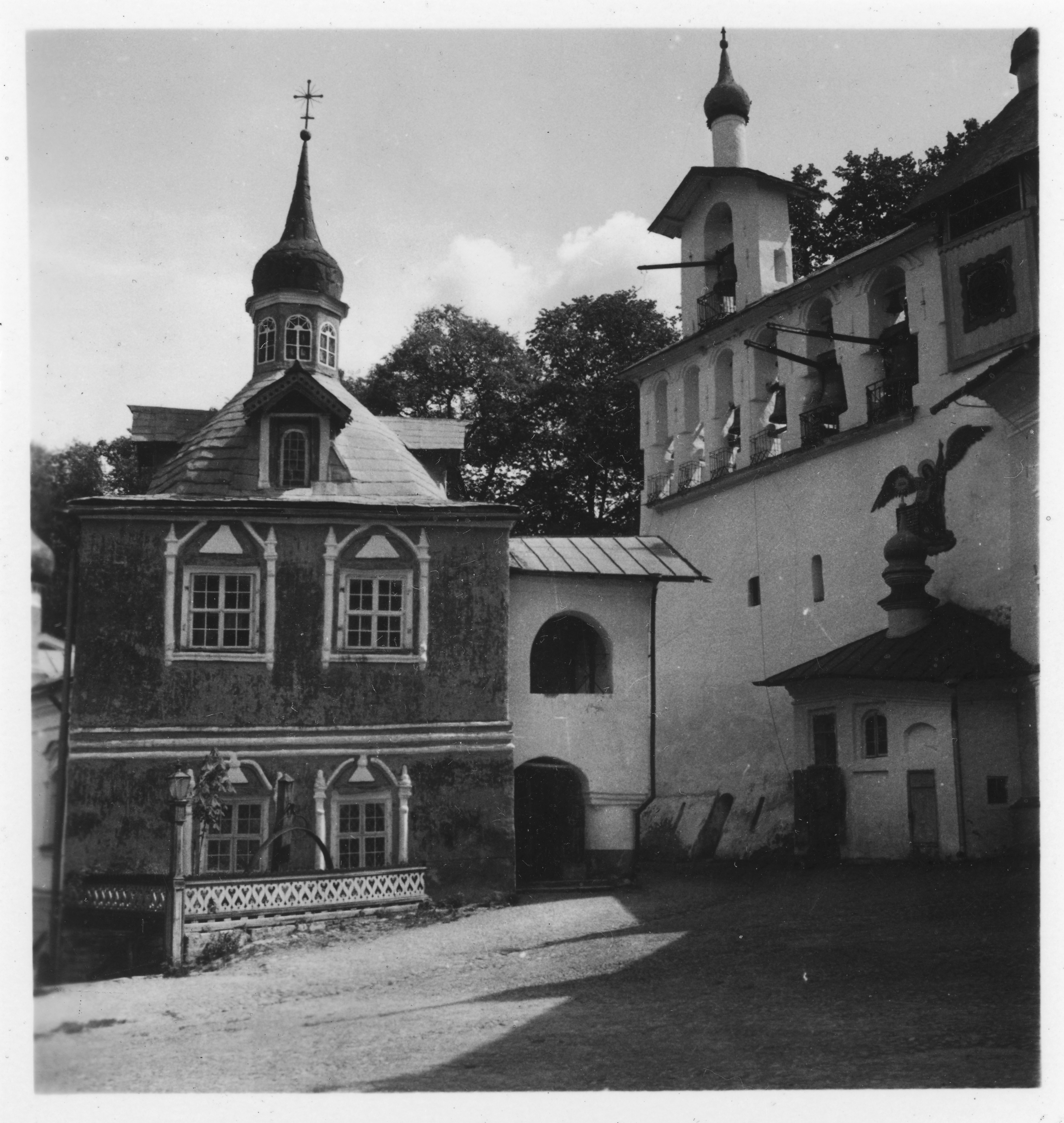
Monastery in the interbellum

In the interbellum, Petseri, as it was called at that time, was the centre of Petseri County, one of the eleven counties that made up the Republic of Estonia. Under Estonian rule, the town's population more than doubled, predominantly due to the arrival of ethnic Estonians. Tuition at the municipal primary schools was conducted in both Russian and Estonian, with more bias toward the latter following the Schools Reform of 1934. In May 1925, most of the land owned by the Pskov-Caves Monastery was confiscated by the Estonian government and provided to new settlers. St. Peter's Lutheran Church was built in 1926. In 1939, a huge fire broke out in the town, destroying 212 wooden buildings and killing many inhabitants.

During World War II, after the occupation of Estonia by the Soviet Union in 1940, the town initially remained part of the Estonian SSR. The town was occupied by the German Army from July 10, 1941 until August 11, 1944 and administered as part of the Generalbezirk Estland of Reichskommissariat Ostland. In 1943–1944, the Germans operated a forced labour camp for Jews in the town.

According to a decree of USSR Supreme Soviet dated 23 August 1944 and a decree dated January 16, 1945, Pechory and the eastern part of Petseri County were transferred to the Pskov Oblast of the Russian SFSR, and the Pechorsky District was established. During the Soviet period, bilingual schooling continued, and in 1956, Pechory Secondary School No. 2 was opened for Estonian-speaking students.

In 1976, the town's boundaries were further expanded to encompass the railway station and a few adjacent villages, including Kunichina Gora, which now hosts a border crossing point.

After Estonian independence was re-established in 1991, the town and the territory around it were claimed by Estonia because of the terms of the Tartu Peace Treaty, in which the Soviet Union had relinquished further claims to Estonian territory. Estonia was reported to have dropped this claim in November 1995. A new Estonian-Russian Border Treaty was signed by Estonia on May 18, 2005, reflecting the later border changes, but was rejected and cancelled by Russia on June 27, 2005, because references to "Soviet occupation" were added by the Estonians. A series of inter-governmental consultations took place in the decade that followed, and on February 18, 2014, the new version of the Border Treaty was signed by both countries. The latest version leaves the agreed border intact with a few minor exemptions not affecting the town of Pechory. Its parliamentary ratification by both sides is pending.

== Administrative and municipal status ==
Within the framework of administrative divisions, Pechory serves as the administrative center of the Pechorsky District, to which it is directly subordinated. As a municipal division, the town of Pechory, together with forty-two rural localities, is incorporated within the Pechorsky Municipal District as the Pechory Urban Settlement.

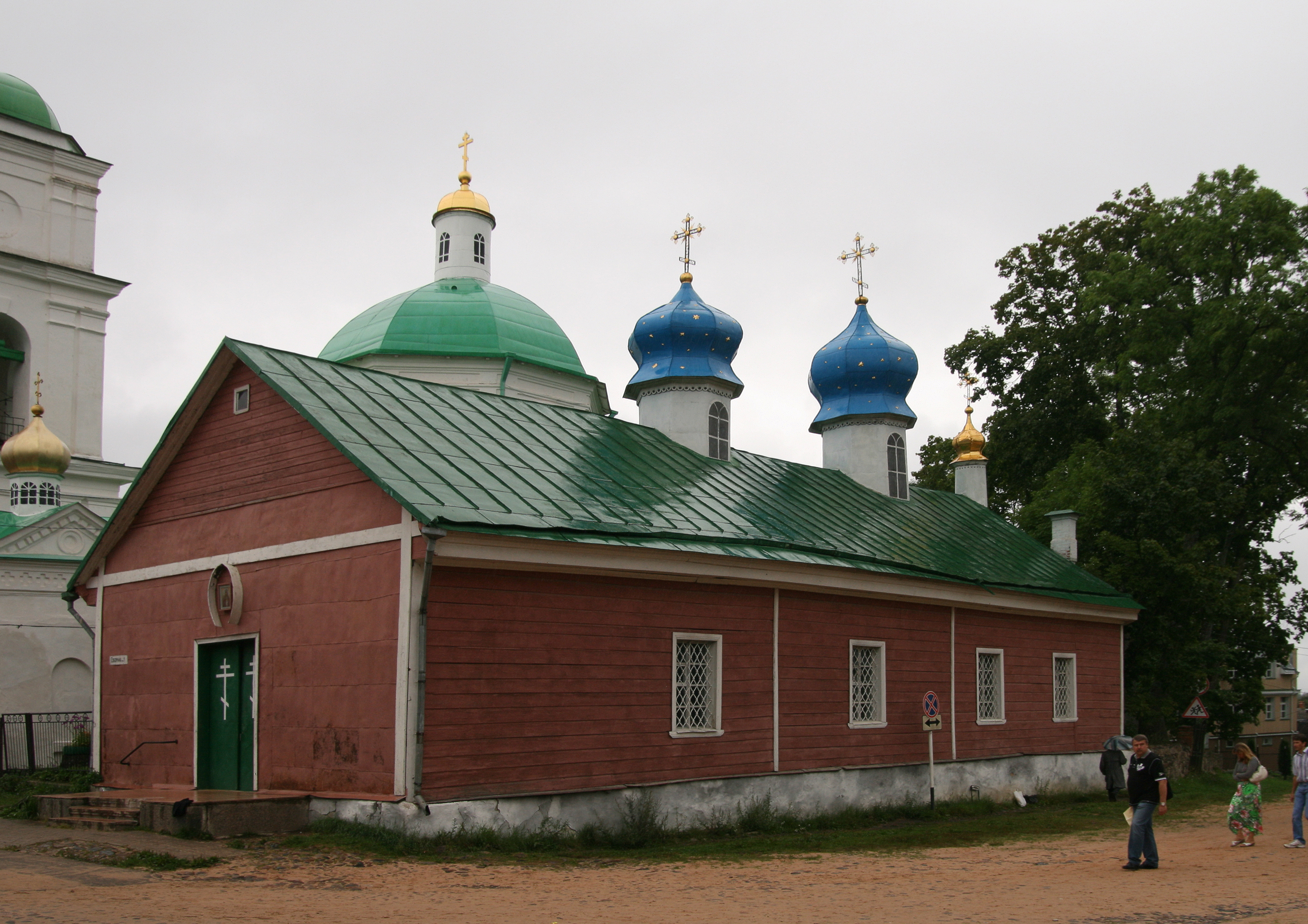
Saint Barbara Church

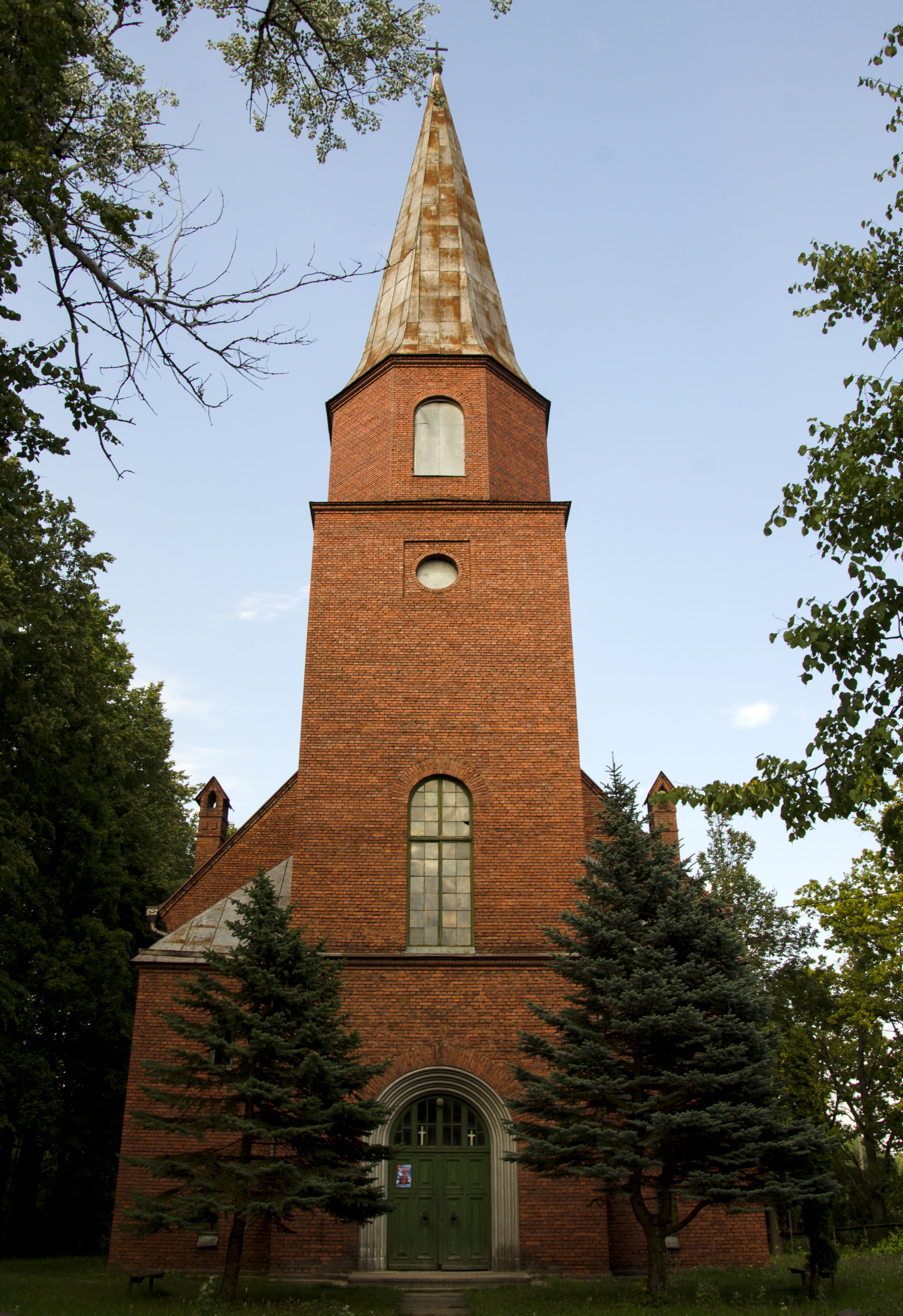
Saint Peter Church

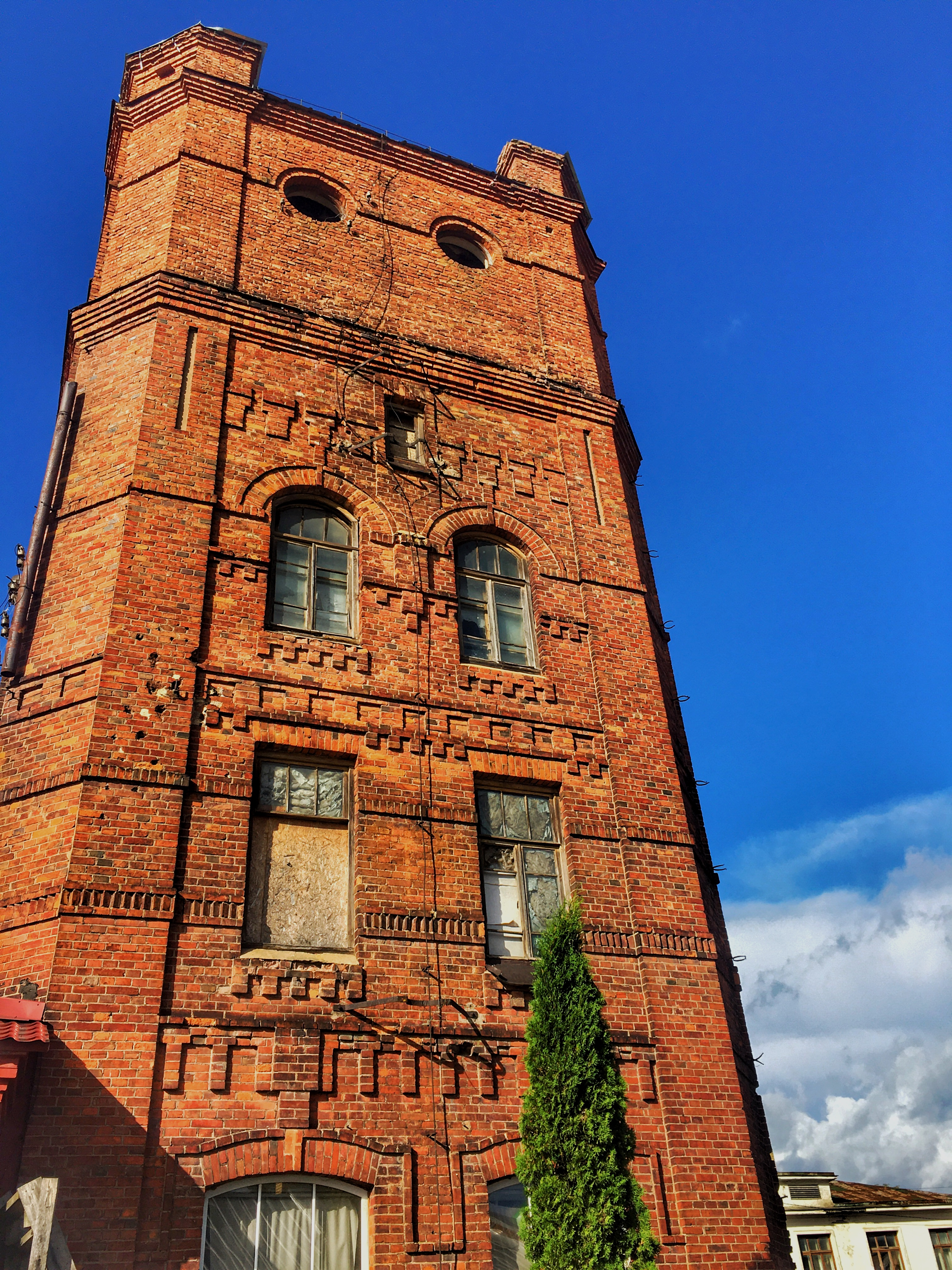
Water tower

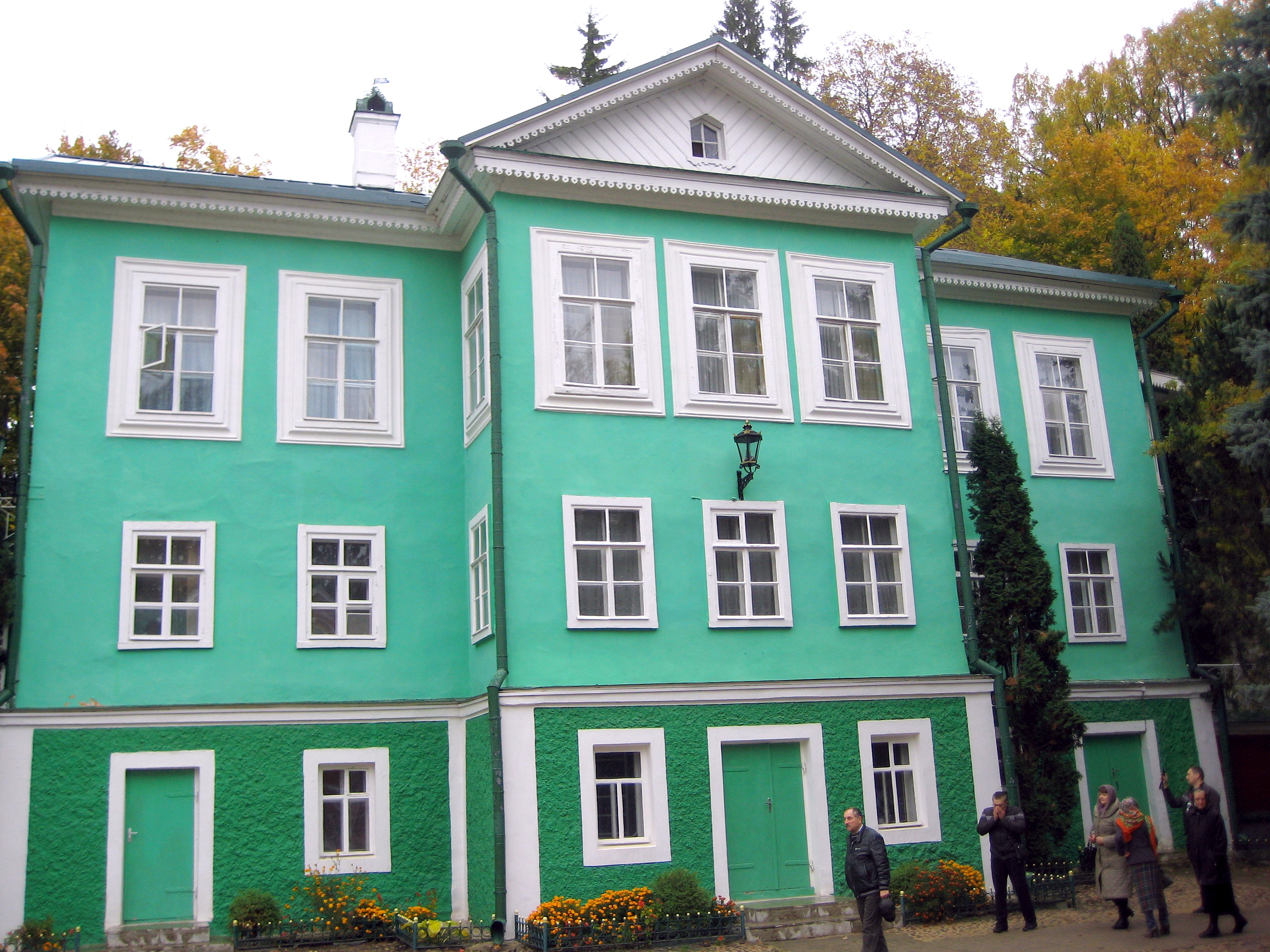
Abbot's House

== Demographics ==
Historical population

Year	Pop.	±%
1897	1,269	—
1939	4,962	+291.0%
1959	6,837	+37.8%
1970	7,194	+5.2%
1979	9,894	+37.5%

Year	Pop.	±%
1989	11,956	+20.8%
2002	13,056	+9.2%
2010	11,195	−14.3%
2021	10,247	−8.5%

Source: Census data

== Religion ==
Pechory is famous for the Russian Orthodox Pskov-Caves Monastery. St. Peter's Evangelical Lutheran Church is also situated in the town. It is famous for its historic organ.

== Culture ==
During the 1930s Russian song festivals inspired by similar Estonian events were held in the town.

Pechory hosts a museum, two libraries, cultural centre and an arts school for children. Apart from the official and religious events, festivals on Maslenitsa and Ivan Kupala are held there. The Seto Estate Museum is located near the town.

== Notable people ==
- Alfred Hirv, Estonian painter
- Heino Kostabi, Estonian politician
- Lilli Promet, Estonian writer
- Jaanus Sirel, Estonian footballer
- Johannes Kert, Estonian military officer and politician
- John Krestiankin, a prominent Russian Orthodox monk (archimandrite)
- Endel Tulving, Estonian-Canadian psychologist and neuroscientist

== Sources ==
- Псковское областное Собрание депутатов. Закон №833-оз от 5 февраля 2009 г. «Об административно-территориальном устройстве Псковской области». Вступил в силу со дня официального опубликования. Опубликован: "Псковская правда", №20, 10 февраля 2009 г. (Pskov Oblast Council of Deputies. Law #833-oz of February 5, 2009 On the Administrative-Territorial Structure of Pskov Oblast. Effective as of the official publication date.).
- Псковское областное Собрание депутатов. Закон №420-оз от 28 февраля 2005 г. «Об установлении границ и статусе вновь образуемых муниципальных образований на территории Псковской области», в ред. Закона №1542-ОЗ от 5 июня 2015 г. «О внесении изменений в Закон Псковской области "Об установлении границ и статусе вновь образуемых муниципальных образований на территории Псковской области"». Вступил в силу со дня официального опубликования. Опубликован: "Псковская правда", №41–43, №44–46, №49–51, 4 марта 2005 г., 5 марта 2005 г., 11 марта 2005 г. (Pskov Oblast Council of Deputies. Law #420-oz of February 28, 2005 On Establishing the Borders and the Status of the Newly Formed Municipal Formations on the Territory of Pskov Oblast, as amended by the Law #1542-OZ of June 5, 2015 On Amending the Law of Pskov Oblast "On Establishing the Borders and the Status of the Newly Formed Municipal Formations on the Territory of Pskov Oblast". Effective as of the official publication date.).
- Архивный отдел Псковского облисполкома. Государственный архив Псковской области. "Административно-территориальное деление Псковской области (1917–1988 гг.). Справочник". (Administrative-Territorial Structure of Pskov Oblast (1917–1988). Reference.) Книга I. Лениздат, 1988
