= Setomaa =

Region in SE Estonia

Coordinates: 57°49′N 27°36′E

Flag of Setomaa

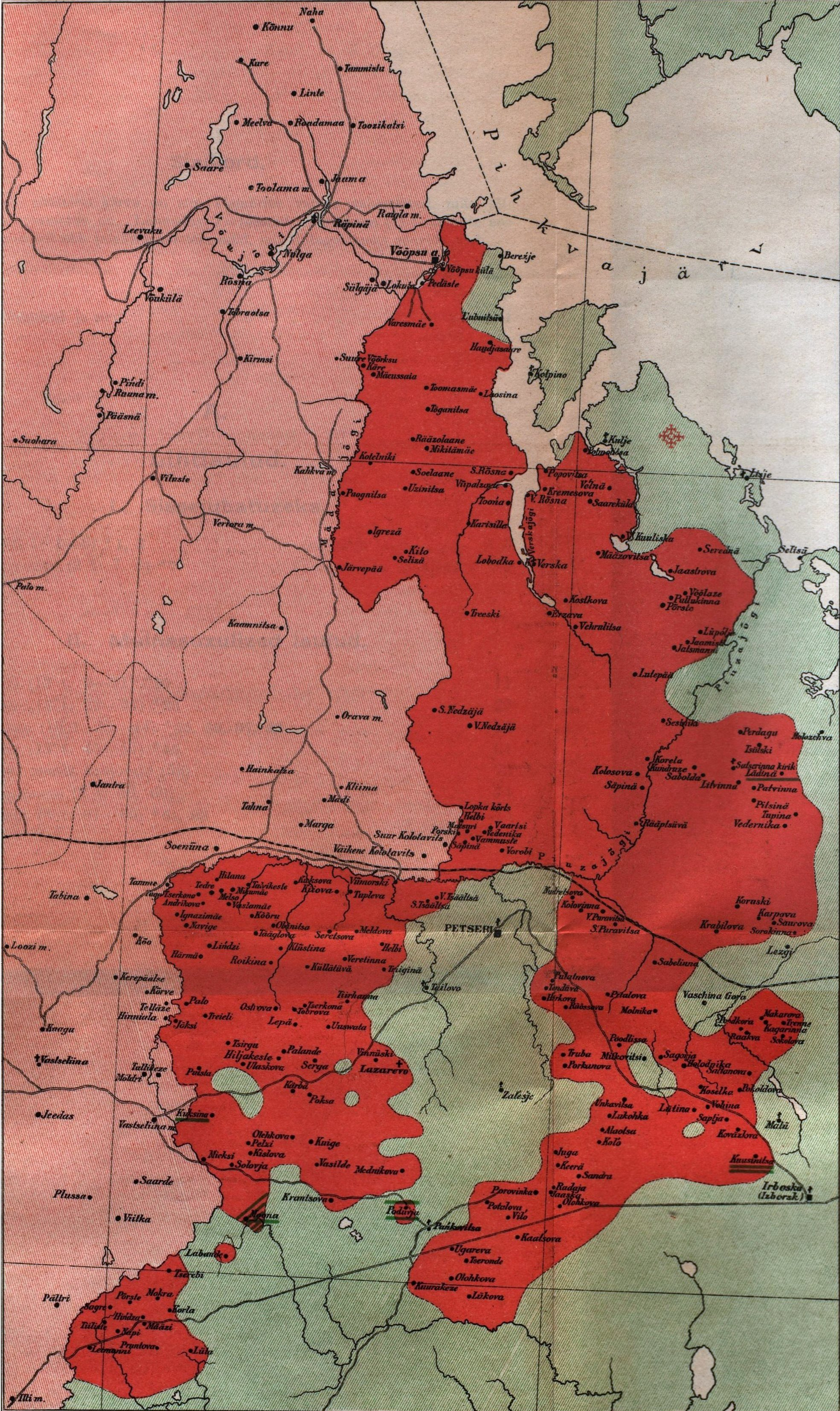
Map of Setomaa from 1902. Regions then inhabited by Seto people in red, Russian-speaking areas in green, and (non-Seto) Estonian-speaking areas in pink.

Setomaa (Estonian: Setumaa; Russian: Сетумаа, Seto: Setomaa) is a region south of Lake Peipus and traditionally inhabited by the Seto people. The Seto dialect is a variety of South Estonian. The historic range of Setomaa is located in the territories of present-day Estonia and Russia. Estonian Setomaa presently consists of lands in Võru County located in southeastern Estonia and bordering Russia. Petseri (Russian: Pechory) has been the historic and cultural centre for the Setos.

== Current subdivision ==
Estonian Setomaa consists of:

- In Võrumaa county:
  - Setomaa Parish (municipality)

The Russian part consists of Pechorsky District, part of Pskov Oblast. Between 1918 and 1944, the area was part of Estonia, administered as Petseri County. After Estonia regained its independence from the Soviet Union in 1991, there was a dispute between Estonia and Russia over the possession of this territory until Estonia dropped its territorial claims to these areas in 1995.
