= Treaty of Tartu (Estonia–Russia) =

1920 treaty between Estonia and the Soviet Union

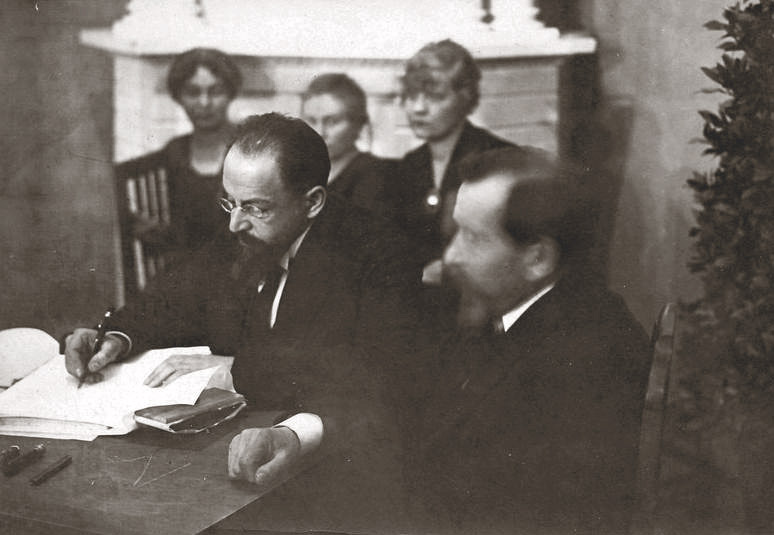
- Adolph Joffe (Soviet Russia, left) signing the Treaty of Tartu
- Type: Peace treaty
- Signed: 2 February 1920
- Location: Tartu, Estonia
- Parties: Soviet Russia; Estonia

The Treaty of Tartu (Estonian: Tartu rahuleping, lit. 'Tartu peace', Russian: Юрьевский (Тартуский) договор) is a peace treaty that was signed in Tartu on 2 February 1920 between the Republic of Estonia and Soviet Russia, ending the 1918–1920 Estonian War of Independence. In the treaty, Bolshevik Russia recognized the independence of the newly established state of Estonia.

The terms of the treaty stated: "In consequence of the right of all peoples to self-determination, to the point of seceding completely from the State of which they form part, a right proclaimed by the Socialist and Federal Russian Republic of the Soviets, Russia unreservedly recognizes the independence and sovereignty of the State of Estonia, and renounces voluntarily and forever all sovereign rights possessed by Russia over the Estonian people and territory whether these rights be based on the juridical position that formerly existed in public law, or in the international treaties which, in the sense here indicated, lose their validity in future." Ratifications of the treaty were exchanged in Moscow on 30 March 1920. It was registered in League of Nations Treaty Series on 12 July 1922.

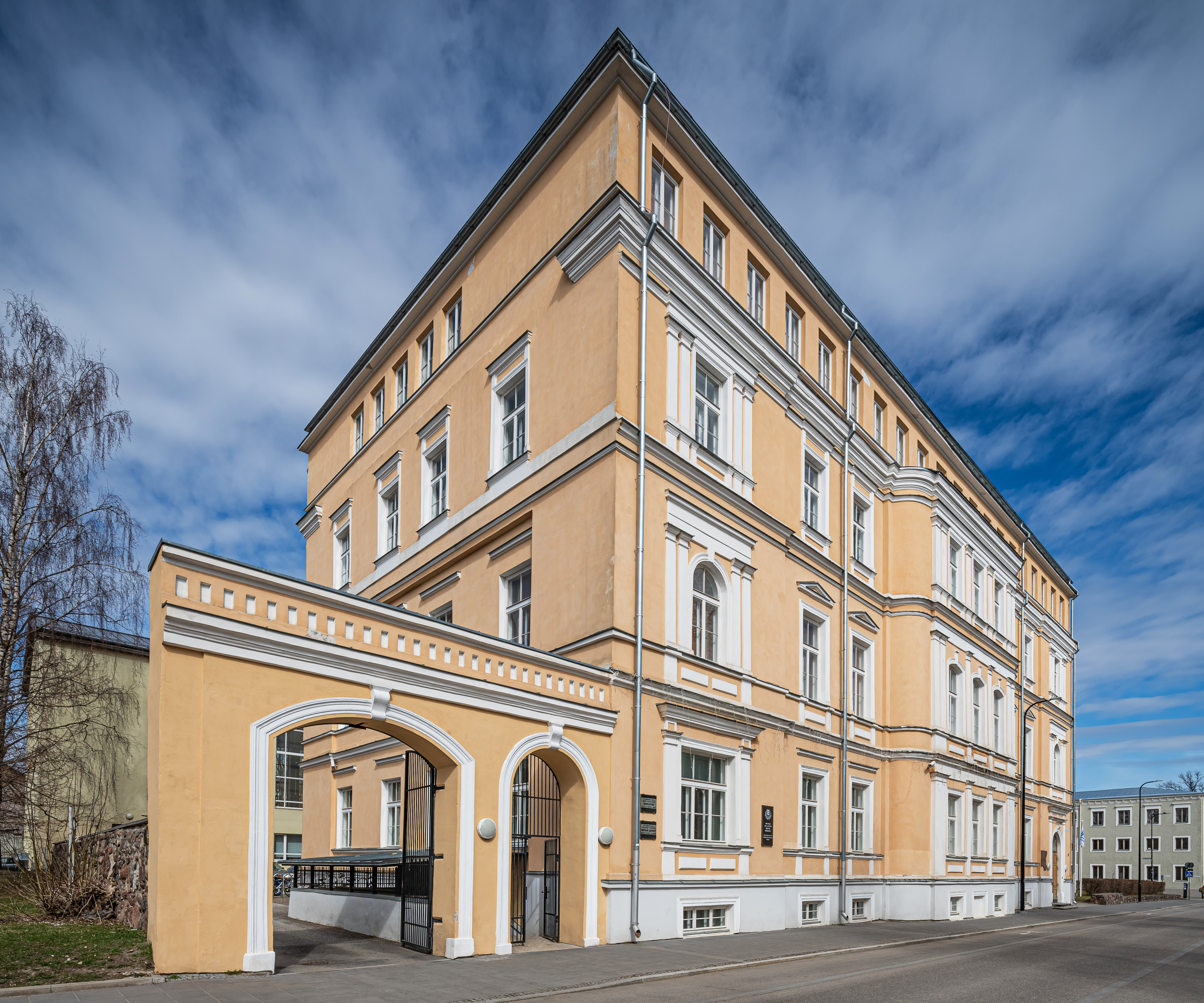
The building in Tartu where the treaty was signed

== Estonia before the treaty ==
Estonia had been a province of Imperial Russia since 1721. In 1917, three years into World War I, the Russian Empire fell into revolution and civil war. As a part of this larger conflict, the Estonians declared independence from the then warring Russian and German Empires, and won their freedom during the Estonian War of Independence. The new Bolshevik Russian government acknowledged Estonia's freedom in the 1920 Treaty of Tartu.

== Treaty provisions ==
The treaty established the border between Estonia and Russia, affirmed the right of Estonian people to return to Estonia and Russian people to return to Russia and required that Estonian movable property evacuated to Russia in World War I be returned to Estonia. The Russian Soviet Federative Socialist Republic also agreed to absolve all Russian Imperial debt and to pay Estonia 15 million gold rubles, a share from the gold reserves of the former Russian Empire. Additionally the RSFSR agreed to grant concessions to exploit one million hectares of Russian forest land and to build a railway line from the Estonian border to Moscow.

== Signatories ==
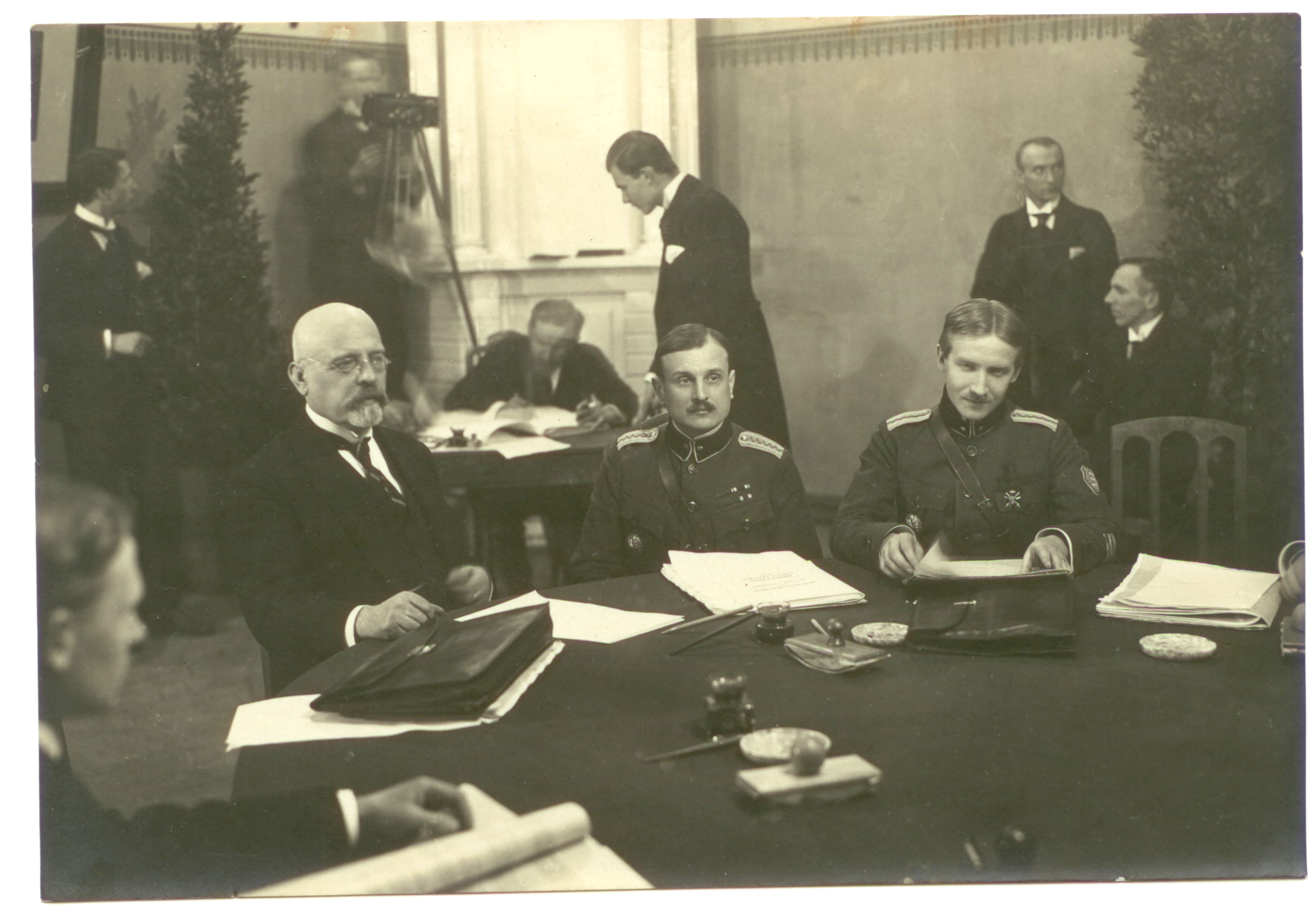
Part of the Estonian delegation at the Treaty of Tartu (left to right): Jaan Poska, Jaan Soots and Victor Mutt

The treaty was signed by Jaan Poska on the Estonian side and Adolf Joffe for Soviet Russia, as well as by other representatives of both parties.

== Significance ==
The Tartu Peace Treaty has been regarded as the birth certificate of the Republic of Estonia because it was the first de jure recognition of the state. The treaty was also of utmost importance to the diplomatically isolated Soviet Russia, with Lenin expressing satisfaction with the treaty as "an incomparable victory over Western imperialism". Some members of the Entente opposed the treaty with the intention to keep Soviet Russia in international isolation.

== Aftermath ==
After the signing, Soviet Russia did not fulfill several points of the treaty. For example, the museological collections of the University of Tartu have not been returned to this day from Voronezh and the migration of Estonians was obstructed.

In 1940–1941 and 1944–1991 Estonia was occupied by the Soviet Union. The Soviet occupation between 1942–1944 was interrupted by the Soviet-German war, during which it was occupied by the Germans.

The Estonia–Russia border today leaves some land granted to Estonia by the Treaty of Tartu under Russian control.

== See also ==
- Latvian–Soviet Peace Treaty
- Soviet–Lithuanian Peace Treaty
- Treaty of Tartu (Finland–Russia)
- Peace of Riga (Poland, Soviet Russia and Soviet Ukraine)
