= Palkino =

Set index of articles associated with the same name

Palkino (Russian: Палкино) is the name of several inhabited localities in Russia.

== Arkhangelsk Oblast ==
As of 2010, one rural locality in Arkhangelsk Oblast bears this name:

- Palkino, Arkhangelsk Oblast, a village in Lipovsky Selsoviet of Velsky District

== Ivanovo Oblast ==
As of 2010, two rural localities in Ivanovo Oblast bear this name:

- Palkino, Lukhsky District, Ivanovo Oblast, a village in Lukhsky District
- Palkino, Shuysky District, Ivanovo Oblast, a village in Shuysky District

== Kirov Oblast ==
As of 2010, three rural localities in Kirov Oblast bear this name:

- Palkino, Lebyazhsky District, Kirov Oblast, a village in Lazhsky Rural Okrug of Lebyazhsky District
- Palkino, Podosinovsky District, Kirov Oblast, a village under the administrative jurisdiction of the urban-type settlement of Podosinovets, Podosinovsky District
- Palkino, Uninsky District, Kirov Oblast, a village in Sardyksky Rural Okrug of Uninsky District

== Kostroma Oblast ==
As of 2010, three rural localities in Kostroma Oblast bear this name:

- Palkino, Antropovsky District, Kostroma Oblast, a selo in Palkinskoye Settlement of Antropovsky District
- Palkino, Kostromskoy District, Kostroma Oblast, a village in Baksheyevskoye Settlement of Kostromskoy District
- Palkino, Neysky District, Kostroma Oblast, a village in Fufayevskoye Settlement of Neysky District

== Moscow Oblast ==
As of 2010, one rural locality in Moscow Oblast bears this name:

- Palkino, Moscow Oblast, a village in Mikulinskoye Rural Settlement of Lotoshinsky District

== Nizhny Novgorod Oblast ==
As of 2010, one rural locality in Nizhny Novgorod Oblast bears this name:

- Palkino, Nizhny Novgorod Oblast, a village in Belovsko-Novinsky Selsoviet of Chkalovsky District

== Pskov Oblast ==
As of 2010, four inhabited localities in Pskov Oblast bear this name.

Urban localities

- Palkino, Palkinsky District, Pskov Oblast, a work settlement in Palkinsky District

Rural localities

- Palkino, Bezhanitsky District, Pskov Oblast, a village in Bezhanitsky District
- Palkino, Nevelsky District, Pskov Oblast, a village in Nevelsky District
- Palkino, Pskovsky District, Pskov Oblast, a village in Pskovsky District

== Smolensk Oblast ==
As of 2010, two rural localities in Smolensk Oblast bear this name:

- Palkino, Krasninsky District, Smolensk Oblast, a village in Maleyevskoye Rural Settlement of Krasninsky District
- Palkino, Vyazemsky District, Smolensk Oblast, a village in Tumanovskoye Rural Settlement of Vyazemsky District

== Tver Oblast ==
As of 2010, two rural localities in Tver Oblast bear this name:

- Palkino, Kalininsky District, Tver Oblast, a village in Kalininsky District
- Palkino, Sonkovsky District, Tver Oblast, a village in Sonkovsky District

== Vladimir Oblast ==
As of 2010, one rural locality in Vladimir Oblast bears this name:

- Palkino, Vladimir Oblast, a village in Vyaznikovsky District

== Vologda Oblast ==
As of 2010, three rural localities in Vologda Oblast bear this name:

- Palkino, Belozersky District, Vologda Oblast, a village in Bechevinsky Selsoviet of Belozersky District
- Palkino, Gryazovetsky District, Vologda Oblast, a village in Pertsevsky Selsoviet of Gryazovetsky District
- Palkino, Vologodsky District, Vologda Oblast, a village in Votchinsky Selsoviet of Vologodsky District

== Yaroslavl Oblast ==
As of 2010, three rural localities in Yaroslavl Oblast bear this name:

- Palkino, Myshkinsky District, Yaroslavl Oblast, a village in Povodnevsky Rural Okrug of Myshkinsky District
- Palkino, Lomovsky Rural Okrug, Rybinsky District, Yaroslavl Oblast, a village in Lomovsky Rural Okrug of Rybinsky District
- Palkino, Pogorelsky Rural Okrug, Rybinsky District, Yaroslavl Oblast, a village in Pogorelsky Rural Okrug of Rybinsky District
