= Ostrovsky District, Pskov Oblast =

Ostrovsky District Островский район (Russian)
- District
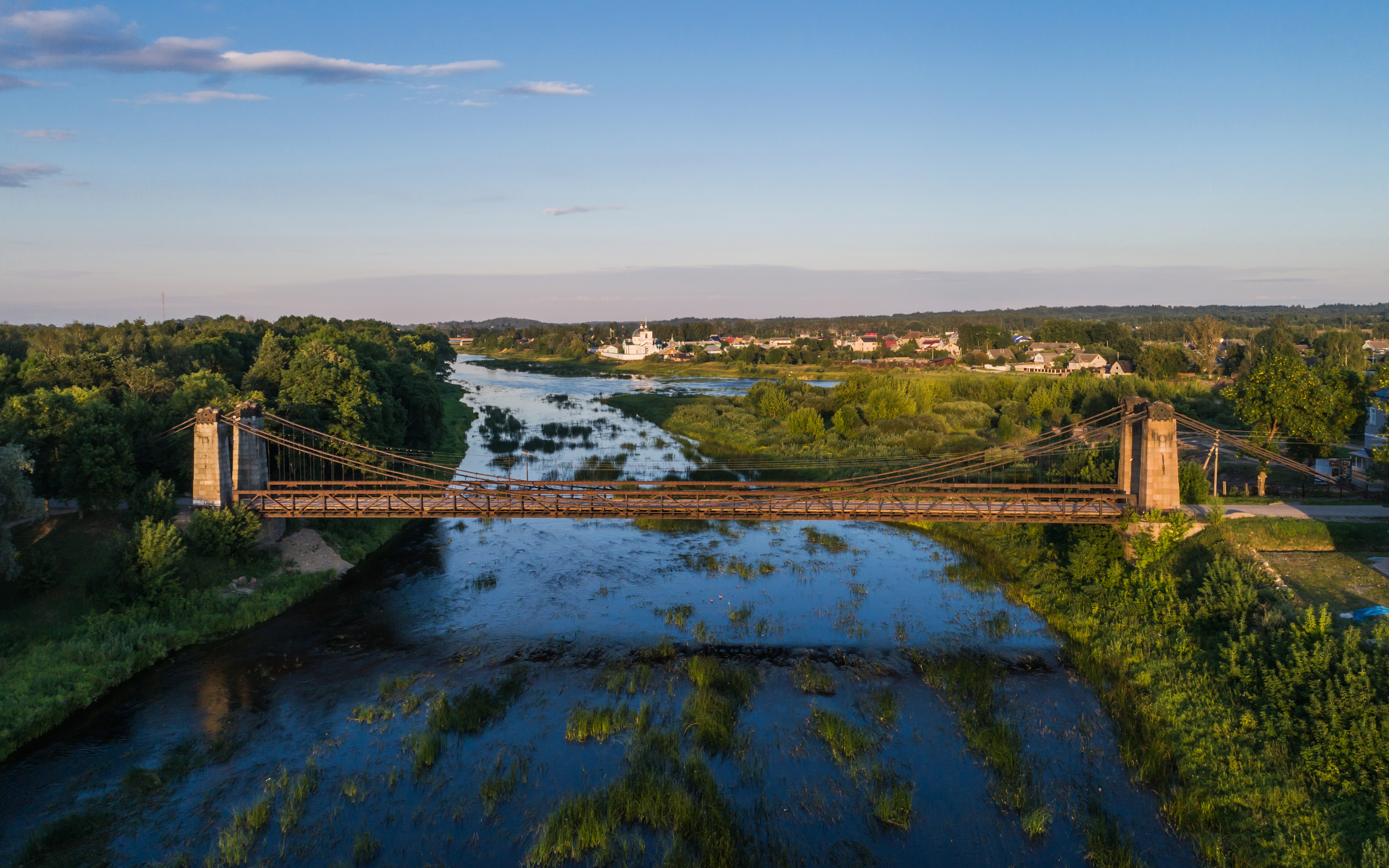
- The chain bridge in Ostrov

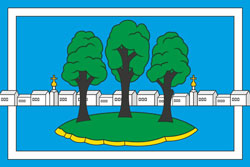
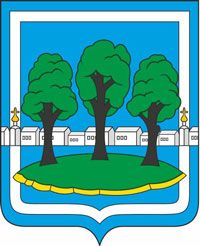
- Flag Coat of arms
- Location of Ostrovsky District in Pskov Oblast
- Coordinates: 57°20′N 28°21′E
- Country: Russia
- Federal subject: Pskov Oblast
- Established: 1 August 1927
- Administrative center: Ostrov

Area
  - Total: 2,400 km^{2} (930 sq mi)

Population (2010 Census)
  - Total: 31,096
  - Density: 13/km^{2} (34/sq mi)
  - Urban: 69.7%
  - Rural: 30.3%

Administrative structure
  - Inhabited localities: 1 cities/towns, 460 rural localities

Municipal structure
  - Municipally incorporated as: Ostrovsky Municipal District
  - Municipal divisions: 1 urban settlements, 6 rural settlements
- Time zone: UTC+3 (MSK)
- OKTMO ID: 58633000
- Website: http://ostrov.reg60.ru/

Ostrovsky District (Russian: О́стровский райо́н) is an administrative and municipal district (raion), one of the twenty-four in Pskov Oblast, Russia. It is located in the west of the oblast and borders with Pskovsky District in the north, Porkhovsky District in the northeast, Novorzhevsky District in the southeast, Pushkinogorsky and Krasnogorodsky Districts in the south, Pytalovsky District in the west, and with Palkinsky District in the northwest. The area of the district is 2,400 square kilometers (930 sq mi). Its administrative center is the town of Ostrov. Population: 31,096 (2010 census); 36,685 (2002 Census); 14,199 (1989 Soviet census). The population of Ostrov accounts for 69.7% of the district's total population.

== Geography ==
The entire district lies in the basin of the Velikaya River, a major tributary of Lake Peipus. The Velikaya crosses the district from southeast to northwest; the town of Ostrov is located on its banks. The major tributaries of the Velikaya within the district are the Sinyaya, the Utroya, and the Kukhva (all left). The rivers in the east of the district drain into the Cheryokha, which has its source in the district, flows north, and beyond the district limits joins the Velikaya from the right.

== History ==
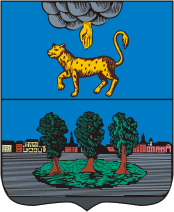
Coat of arms of Ostrov, as of 1781

Ostrov was first mentioned in 1342. At the time, it was a fortress subordinate to Pskov and protecting it from the south. Already in the end of the 14th century the fortress was built in stone. In 1406, the Livonian Order besieged Ostrov but failed to conquer it. The fortress was first conquered by the Order in 1501, and the town was devastated. In the 18th century, the state border was moved further to the west, and the area lost its military importance.

In the course of the administrative reform carried out in 1708 by Peter the Great, the area was included into Ingermanland Governorate (known since 1710 as Saint Petersburg Governorate). Ostrov is specifically mentioned as one of the towns making up the governorate. In 1727, separate Novgorod Governorate was split off, and in 1772, Pskov Governorate (which between 1777 and 1796 existed as Pskov Viceroyalty) was established. The area was a part of Ostrovsky Uyezd of Pskov Governorate.

On August 1, 1927, the uyezds were abolished, and Ostrovsky District was established, with the administrative center in the town of Ostrov. It included parts of former Ostrovsky and Pskovsky Uyezds. The governorates were abolished as well, and the district became a part of Pskov Okrug of Leningrad Oblast. On July 23, 1930, the okrugs were also abolished, and the districts were directly subordinated to the oblast. Between March 22, 1935 and September 19, 1940, Ostrovsky District was a part of Pskov Okrug of Leningrad Oblast, one of the okrugs abutting the state boundaries of the Soviet Union. Between August 1941 and July 1944, Ostrovsky District was occupied by German troops. An underground resistance group was active in Ostrov during the war. On August 23, 1944, the district was transferred to newly established Pskov Oblast.

On August 1, 1927, Palkinsky District was also established, with the administrative center in the selo of Palkino. It included parts of former Pskovsky and Ostrovsky Uyezds and was a part of Pskov Okrug of Leningrad Oblast. On September 20, 1931, Palkinsky District was abolished and merged into Ostrovsky District. On February 15, 1935, the district was re-established on the territory which formerly constituted parts of Pskovsky and Ostrovsky Districts.

On February 15, 1935, Soshikhinsky District was established on the parts of Ostrovsky and Slavkovsky Districts. The administrative center of the district was located in the selo of Vorontsovo. Between March 22, 1935 and September 19, 1940, Soshikhinsky District was a part of Pskov Okrug of Leningrad Oblast. Between August 1941 and July 1944, Soshikhinsky District was occupied by German troops. On August 23, 1944, the district was transferred to newly established Pskov Oblast. On October 3, 1959 the district was abolished and split between Ostrovsky and Novorzhevsky Districts. After the administrative reforms of the 1960s, the whole of the former Soshikhinsky District was transferred to Ostrovsky District.

Between 1959 and 1965, parts of Pytalovsky District were temporarily transferred to Ostrovsky District. Between 1961 and 1966, parts of Palkinsky District were temporarily transferred to Ostrovsky District.

== Economy ==
=== Industry ===
The economy of the district is based on food industry (45.8% of the gross product in 2009), electronic industry (28.2%), and textile industry (5.4%).

=== Agriculture ===
The main agricultural specializations of the district are cattle (with meat and milk production) and poultry breeding.

=== Transportation ===
A railway from St. Petersburg via Pskov to Pytalovo and further to Rēzekne in Latvia crosses the district from north to south. In Latvia, it provides access to Riga and Vilnius (via Daugavpils). As of 2012, there was passenger traffic on the railway.

The M20 highway, which connects St. Petersburg and Vitebsk via Pskov, crosses the district from north to south. Ostrov is the northern terminus of the European route E262, which proceeds to Kaunas via Rēzekne and Daugavpils. The stretch between Ostrov and Latvian border has been a toll road since 2002. There are also road connections from Ostrov northwest to Pechory via Palkino, northeast to Porkhov, and southeast to Novorzhev, as well as local roads. The stretch between Ostrov and Pechory is a toll road as well.

None of the rivers within the district are navigable.

== Culture and recreation ==
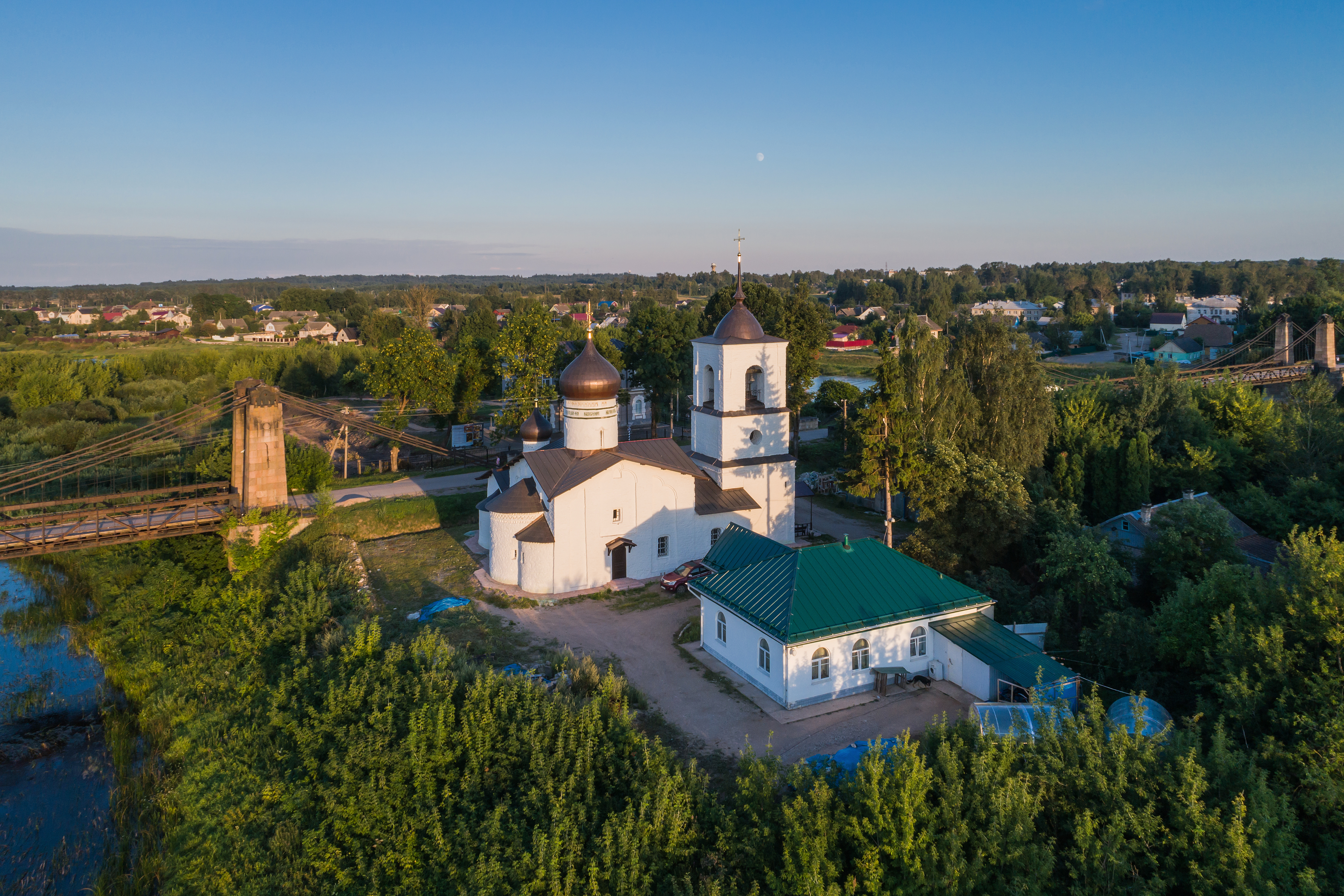
The St. Nicholas Church in Ostrov

The district contains six cultural heritage monuments of federal significance (all of them in the town of Ostrov) and additionally ninety-nine objects classified as cultural and historical heritage of local significance (fifty-one of them in Ostrov). The federally protected monuments are the St. Nicholas Church, the Trinity Church, the trading arcades, the bridge, the monument to Klavdiya Nazarova, an organizer of the underground during World War II, and the site of the former Ostrov fortress.

Ostrov hosts the Ostrov District Museum, the only museum in the district.
