= Abrene =

Abrene may refer to:

- Abrene, the name which the town Pytalovo in Pskov Oblast, Russia bore in 1938–1945 when it was a part of Latvia
- Abrene County, a historical district in Latvia
- Abrene, general Latvian name for the territory of Pytalovsky District in Pskov Oblast, Russia
