= Pechorsky District =

Pechorsky District Печорский район (Russian)
- District
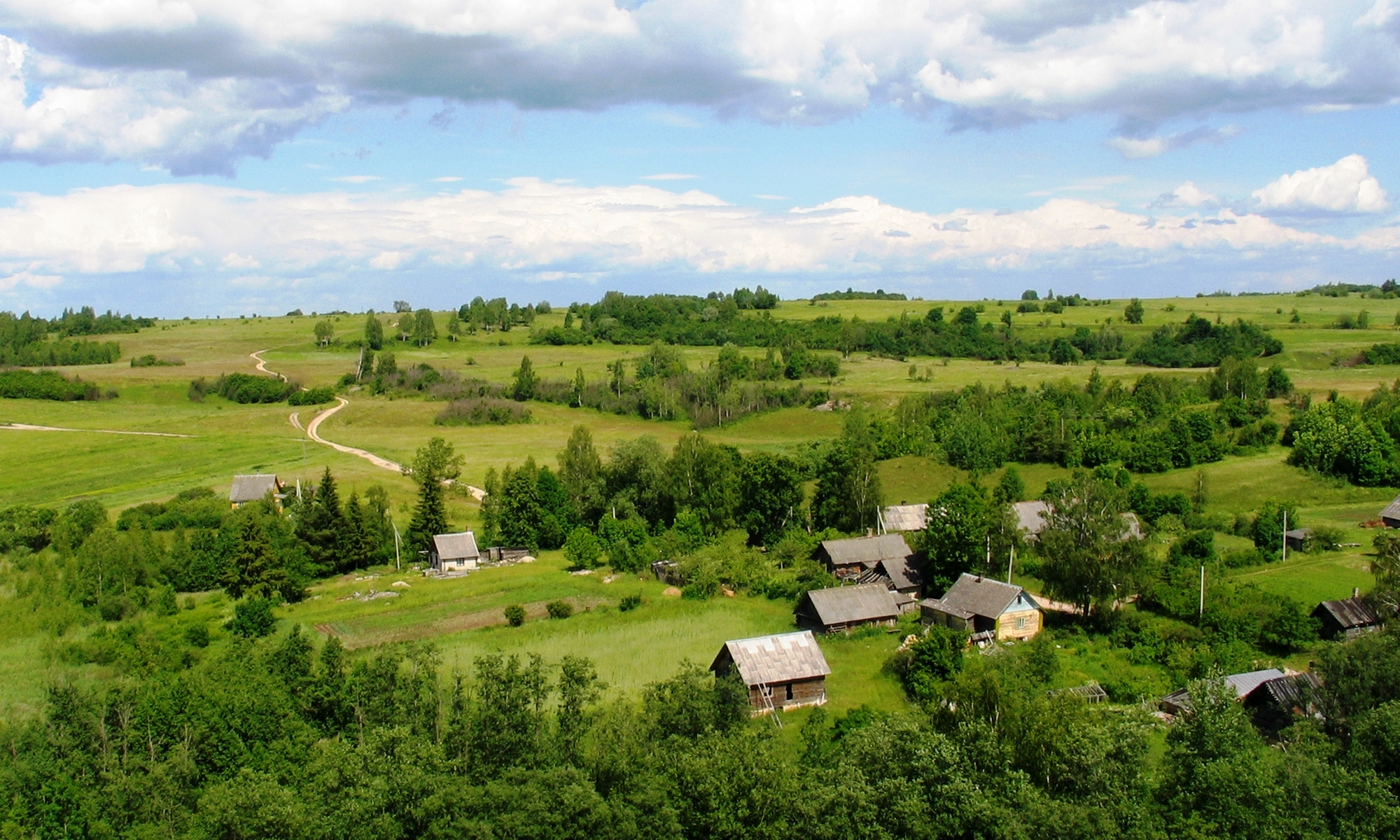
- Izborsk, Pechorsky District

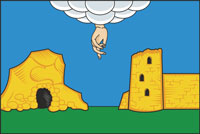
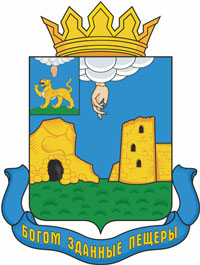
- Flag Coat of arms
- Location of Pechorsky District in Pskov Oblast
- Coordinates: 57°49′N 27°36′E
- Country: Russia
- Federal subject: Pskov Oblast
- Established: January 16, 1945
- Administrative center: Pechory

Area
  - Total: 1,251 km^{2} (483 sq mi)

Population (2010 Census)
  - Total: 22,123
  - Density: 17.68/km^{2} (45.80/sq mi)
  - Urban: 50.6%
  - Rural: 49.4%

Administrative structure
  - Inhabited localities: 1 cities/towns, 386 rural localities

Municipal structure
  - Municipally incorporated as: Pechorsky Municipal District
  - Municipal divisions: 1 urban settlements, 6 rural settlements
- Time zone: UTC+3 (MSK)
- OKTMO ID: 58640000
- Website: http://pechory.reg60.ru/

Pechorsky District (Russian: Печо́рский райо́н) is an administrative and municipal district (raion), one of the twenty-four in Pskov Oblast, Russia. It is located in the northwest of the oblast and borders with Pskovsky District in the northwest, Palkinsky District in the southeast, Alūksne municipality of Latvia in the southwest, and with Võru and Põlva Counties of Estonia in the northwest. Lake Peipus limits the district from the north. The area of the district is 1,251 square kilometers (483 sq mi). Its administrative center is the town of Pechory. Population: 22,123 (2010 census); 25,300 (2002 Census); 27,199 (1989 Soviet census). The population of Pechory accounts for 50.6% of the district's total population.

== Geography ==
Almost the whole of the district lies in the basin of Lake Peipus. The rivers in the east flow into the Velikaya River, whereas the rivers in the northwest, including the Piusa River, flow into Lake Peipus directly. Minor areas in the southwest of the district belong to the basin of the Pededze River and thus to the basin of the Daugava. A number of islands on Lake Peipus are also under the district's jurisdiction. In particular, Kolpina Island, the largest island of Lake Peipus, with an area of 11.02 square kilometers (4.25 sq mi), is a part of Pechorsky District.

The westernmost point of the Russian Federation's coterminous territory lies on the district's border with Estonia southwest of Pechory, opposite to the settlement of Ritsiko.

== History ==
Historically, the area was first mentioned in the Primary Chronicle, which describes that in 862 Truvor, a legendary brother of Rurik, the first prince of Rus', became the prince of Izborsk in 862. The current scholarly interpretation denies the existence of Truvor, but in any case the area was already a part of the Russian Lands in the 9th century. Later, it was dependent on Pskov, and in 1510 together with Pskov it was included into the Grand Duchy of Moscow. The Pskov-Caves Monastery was founded in the 15th century. In the course of the administrative reform carried out in 1708 by Peter the Great, the area was included into Ingermanland Governorate (known since 1710 as Saint Petersburg Governorate). In 1727, separate Novgorod Governorate was split off, and in 1772, Pskov Governorate (which existed as Pskov Viceroyalty between 1777 and 1796) was established. In 1776, Pechory was granted town status and Pechorsky Uyezd was established, but in 1797, Pechorsky Uyezd was abolished, and the area became a part of Pskovsky Uyezd of Pskov Governorate.

During the last year of World War I, from February to December 1918, the town of Pechory was occupied by German forces. The town was subsequently captured by Estonian forces on March 29, 1919, during the Estonian War of Independence. The Treaty of Tartu, signed on February 2, 1920, assigned Pechory and its surrounding territory, the Setomaa region, to Estonia. Pechory was renamed Petseri and the area became Petseri County (Petserimaa). In 1940, Estonia was annexed by the Soviet Union, and the area became a part of the Estonian Soviet Socialist Republic (Estonian SSR). Between August 1941 and August 1944, the area was occupied by German troops. On January 16, 1945, the greater part of Petserimaa was transferred from the Estonian SSR to Pskov Oblast, and Pechorsky District with the administrative center in Pechory was created.

On January 16, 1945, Kachanovsky District, with the administrative center in the selo of Kachanovo, was created on the territories transferred from the Latvian Soviet Socialist Republic to Pskov Oblast. On January 14, 1958, Kachanovsky District was abolished and split between Pechorsky and Palkinsky Districts.

After Estonian independence was re-established in 1991, the district was claimed by Estonia because of the Treaty of Tartu, in which the Soviet Union had relinquished further claims to Estonian territory. In November 1995, Estonia reportedly dropped this claim. A newer Estonian-Russian Border Treaty was signed by Estonia on May 18, 2005, reflecting the later border changes, but was rejected and cancelled by Russia on June 27, 2005 because references to Soviet occupation were added.

== Demographics ==
In 2010, 19,443 inhabitants of the district were ethnic Russians, 174 Estonians and 115 Setos, a Finnic minority endemic to the region of Setomaa, of which Pechory is the cultural capital.

In 2013, the district had a low unemployment rate of 2.54%.

== Restricted access ==
The part of the district along the state border is included into a border security zone, intended to protect the borders of Russia from unwanted activity. In order to visit the zone, a permit issued by the local Federal Security Service department is required.

== Economy ==
=== Industry ===
In the district, there are enterprises of timber and food industry, as well as production of construction materials, particularly ceramics.

=== Agriculture ===
As of 2011, there were ten large- and mid-scale farms acting in the district. They mainly specialize in meat and milk production, as well as in crops growing.

=== Transportation ===
A railroad connecting Pskov and Tartu crosses the district from east to west. The main stations inside the district are Pechory and Novoizborsk. A railway line to Võru and Valga branches off in Pechory. There is passenger rail traffic between Pskov and Pechory; however, all passenger traffic between Pechory and Estonia has been discontinued.

Pechoty is connected by a highway with Ostrov via Palkino. The whole stretch between Pechory and Ostrov has been a toll road since 2002. The stretch of European route E77 between Pskov and Estonian border crosses the district from east to west. There are also local roads.

== Culture and recreation ==
The district contains eighty-three cultural heritage monuments of federal significance and additionally sixty-three objects classified as cultural and historical heritage of local significance. The federal monuments include, among others, the ensemble of the Pskov-Caves Monastery, founded in the 15th century, and the fortress of Izborsk, which in its current state was built in the 14th century. The district contains a large number of archeological sites as well.
