= Palkinsky District =

Palkinsky District Палкинский район (Russian)
- District
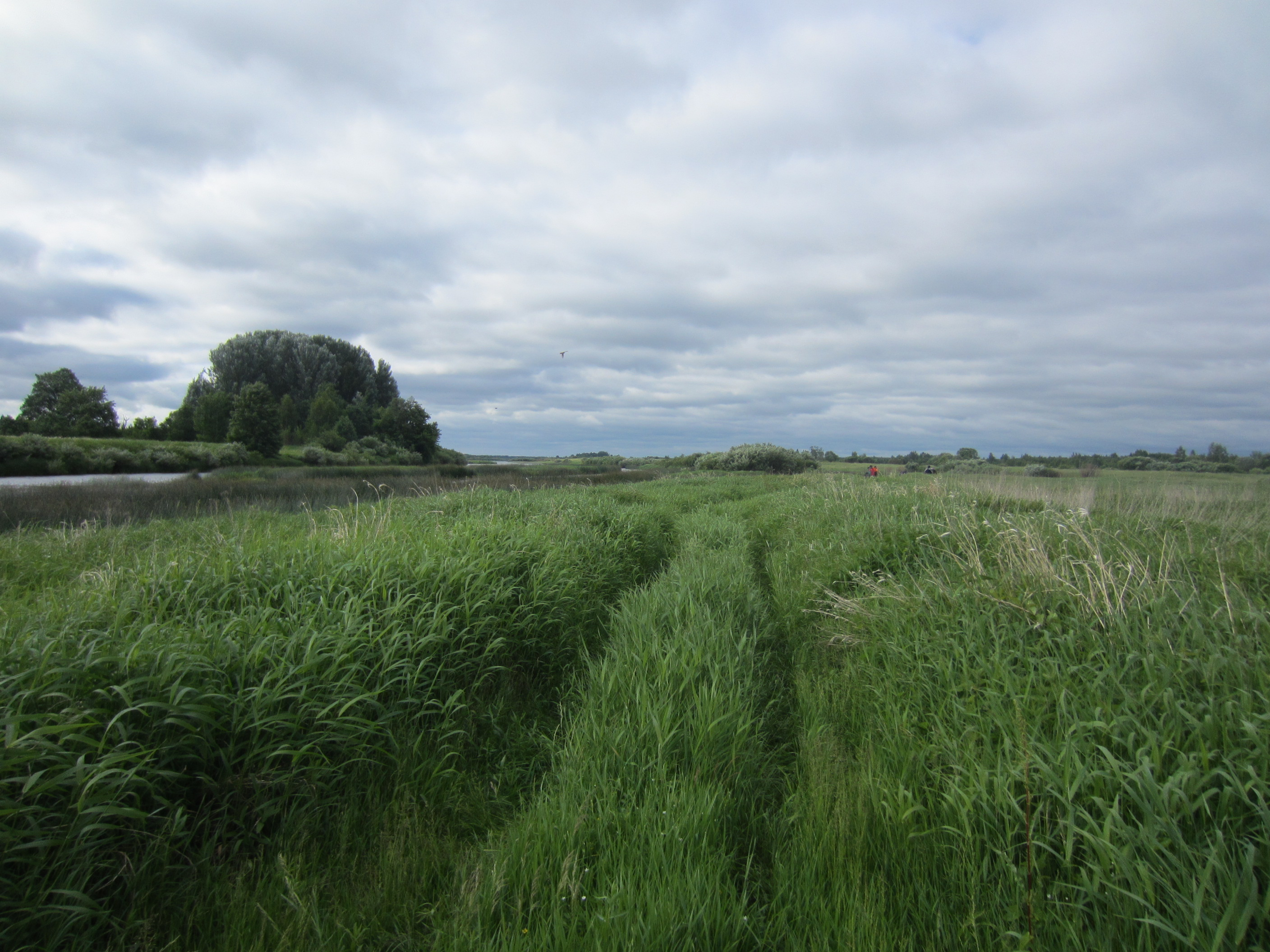
- Landscape in Palkinsky District

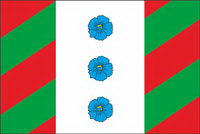
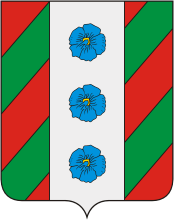
- Flag Coat of arms
- Location of Palkinsky District in Pskov Oblast
- Coordinates: 57°32′N 28°01′E
- Country: Russia
- Federal subject: Pskov Oblast
- Established: 1927
- Administrative center: Palkino

Area
  - Total: 1,191.2 km^{2} (459.9 sq mi)

Population (2010 Census)
  - Total: 8,826
  - Density: 7.409/km^{2} (19.19/sq mi)
  - Urban: 33.1%
  - Rural: 66.9%

Administrative structure
  - Inhabited localities: 1 urban-type settlements, 375 rural localities

Municipal structure
  - Municipally incorporated as: Palkinsky Municipal District
  - Municipal divisions: 1 urban settlements, 6 rural settlements
- Time zone: UTC+3 (MSK)
- OKTMO ID: 58637000
- Website: http://palkino.reg60.ru

Palkinsky District (Russian: Па́лкинский райо́н) is an administrative and municipal district (raion), one of the twenty-four in Pskov Oblast, Russia. It is located in the west of the oblast and borders with Pskovsky District in the northwest, Ostrovsky District in the southeast, Pytalovsky District in the south, Viļaka and Alūksne Municipalities of Latvia in the southwest, and with Pechorsky District in the northwest. The area of the district is 1,191.2 square kilometers (459.9 sq mi). Its administrative center is the urban locality (a work settlement) of Palkino. Population: 8,826 (2010 census); 10,520 (2002 Census); 12,392 (1989 Soviet census). The population of Palkino accounts for 33.1% of the district's total population.

== Geography ==
The district lies in the basin of the Velikaya River. The Velikaya itself crosses the district from south to north. The principal tributary of the Velikaya in the limits of the district is the Vyada, which forms the border with Ostrovsky District. The largest lake, Lake Belaya Struga, has an area of 5.5 square kilometers (2.1 sq mi). About 5% of the district's territory is occupied by swamps. The eastern part of the district is flat; the western part is hilly.

== History ==
Until the 14th century, the area, together with Pskov, was dependent on Novgorod, then became independent, and in 1510 was included into the Grand Duchy of Moscow. In the course of the administrative reform carried out in 1708 by Peter the Great, the area was included into Ingermanland Governorate (known since 1710 as Saint Petersburg Governorate). In 1727, separate Novgorod Governorate was split off, and in 1772, Pskov Governorate (which between 1777 and 1796 existed as Pskov Viceroyalty) was established.

On August 1, 1927, the uyezds were abolished and Palkinsky District was established, with the administrative center in the selo of Palkino. It included parts of former Pskovsky and Ostrovsky Uyezds. The governorates were abolished as well, and the district became a part of Pskov Okrug of Leningrad Oblast. On July 23, 1930, the okrugs were also abolished, and the districts were directly subordinated to the oblast. On September 20, 1931, Palkinsky District was abolished and merged into Ostrovsky District. On February 15, 1935, the district was re-established on the territory which formerly constituted parts of Pskovsky and Ostrovsky Districts. Between March 22, 1935 and September 19, 1940, Palkinsky District was a part of Pskov Okrug of Leningrad Oblast, one of the okrugs abutting the state boundaries of the Soviet Union. Between August 1941 and July 1944, the district was occupied by German troops. On August 23, 1944, the district was transferred to newly established Pskov Oblast. On October 15, 1985, Palkino was granted urban-type settlement status.

On January 16, 1945, Kachanovsky District, with the administrative center in the selo of Kachanovo, was established on the territories transferred from the Latvian Soviet Socialist Republic to Pskov Oblast. On January 14, 1958, Kachanovsky District was abolished and split between Pechorsky and Palkinsky Districts.

== Restricted access ==
The part of the district along the state border is included into a border security zone, intended to protect the borders of Russia from unwanted activity. In order to visit the zone, a permit issued by the local Federal Security Service department is required.

== Economy ==
=== Agriculture ===
The main agricultural specializations in the district are meat and milk production, as well as potato growing. As of 2011, seven large- and mid-scale farms were active in the district.

=== Transportation ===
The railway connecting St. Petersburg and Vitebsk via Pskov crosses the eastern part of the district.

The M20 highway, which also connects St. Petersburg and Vitebsk via Pskov, runs parallel to the railway and crosses the eastern part of the district as well. Palkino is connected by roads to Pskov, to Ostrov, and to the highway connecting Pskov and Riga. There are also local roads. The stretch between Pechory and Ostrov has been a toll road since 2002.

== Culture and recreation ==
The district contains two cultural heritage monuments of federal significance and additionally seventy objects classified as cultural and historical heritage of local significance. The federal monuments are an archeological site and the Church of the Nativity of the Theotokos in the village of Novaya Usitva.
