= Territorial changes of the Baltic states =

Territorial changes of the Baltic states refers to the redrawing of borders of Lithuania, Latvia and Estonia after 1940. The three republics, formerly autonomous regions within the former Russian Empire and before that of former Polish–Lithuanian Commonwealth and as provinces of the Swedish Empire, gained independence in the aftermath of World War I and the Russian Revolution of 1917. After a two-front independence war fought against both Bolshevist Russian and Baltic German nationalist forces, the countries concluded peace and border treaties with Soviet Russia in 1920. However, with World War II and the occupation and annexation of these republics into the Soviet Union twenty years after their independence, certain territorial changes were made in favour of the Russian SFSR. This has been the source of political tensions after they regained their independence with the dissolution of the Soviet Union. Some of the disputes remain unresolved.

The main issues are the territories which were part of Lithuania, Latvia and Estonia in the interwar period, but which became incorporated into the Russian SFSR, Byelorussian SSR and Poland after World War II. In addition, some territories that were not controlled by the independent Baltic republics were also annexed during the Soviet era. The most notable case is Vilnius taken from Poland by the USSR to become the capital of Lithuania.

After the dissolution of the Soviet Union, the issue of these territories was raised by the Estonian and Latvian governments. Lithuania has never officially raised the question of its borders and has border treaties with all its neighbors. Only marginal political groups use the "issue of borders" in their political rhetoric.

== Actual territorial changes after World War II ==
Territorial changes of the Baltic states in 1939–1945

This is a list of actual territorial changes that happened when Lithuania, Latvia and Estonia were incorporated into the Soviet Union and became the Baltic Soviet Socialist Republics. All the boundaries established by these changes exist up to modern days (now they are delimiting the boundaries of independent Baltic states). The modern Russian, Belarusian or Polish official names of locations mentioned in this section are given in the first place, while, where applicable, the official interwar names (Lithuanian, Latvian or Estonian) are given in parentheses.

=== Estonia ===
In January 1945, some territories of Estonian SSR were ceded to the Russian SFSR: the Russian–Estonian boundary in the north of Lake Peipus was moved westwards by about 12 kilometers from its interwar location (which was delimited by the Treaty of Tartu); the new boundary (which exists up until these days) runs along Narva river. The Russian-Estonian boundary that used to run in the middle of Lake Peipus did not change, while the boundary south of Lake Peipus was also moved westwards (by about 25 kilometers). Overall, about 2,210 km^{2} of land changed hands, including Ivangorod (Jaanilinn, then eastern suburb of Narva), the town of Pechory (Petseri), and areas in and around Izborsk (Irboska), Lavry (Laura), and Rotovo (Roodva), and the Kolpina Island (Kulkna) in southern Lake Peipus.

=== Latvia ===
In January 1945, a territory in northeastern Latvian SSR of about 1,300 square kilometers was ceded to Russian SFSR. This area includes towns of Pytalovo (until 1938 Jaunlatgale, since 1938 – Abrene) and four rural districts. All these areas during the interwar constituted the eastern part of the Abrene County of Latvia, while during the Russian Empire they were part of Ostrovsky Uyezd of Pskov Governorate. According to the 1935 Latvian census, Russians were 85.8% of the population of the ceded territory, while Latvians were 12.5%. They were added to Pskov Oblast of Russian SFSR. Russian-Latvian boundary in the southeastern Latvia did not change. Although Poland moved westwards after the war, and now resides over 320 km from the borders of Latvia, traces of its influence continue to remain in Latgale.

=== Lithuania ===
After the annexation of Lithuania into the Soviet Union in 1940, a new eastern boundary of Lithuania (Lithuanian SSR) was delimited. The boundary which was delimited in 1920 by Soviet–Lithuanian Peace Treaty had not been the eastern and southern boundary of Lithuania during most of the period because the Vilnius region became part of Poland in early 1920s. Lithuania, however, continued to claim the 1920 border as official and the Soviets continued to recognise these areas as part of Lithuania rather than Poland as well. In 1940, when Lithuania was incorporated into the Soviet Union, a new boundary was drawn, enlarging the de facto Lithuanian territory, though not to the full extent of the republic's claim. The notable gain was the city of Vilnius, which again became Lithuania's capital. The control of the Vilnius region was partitioned between the Lithuanian SSR (including the towns of Švenčionys, Druskininkai and the village of Dieveniškės), the Belarusian SSR and Nazi Germany (the latter territory was returned to Poland after World War II). Main cities that were recognised by Soviets as a part of Lithuania by the 1920 treaty but were not added to Lithuanian SSR include Grodno (Gardinas), Lida (Lyda), Smarhonʹ (Smurgainys), Pastavy (Pastovys), Ashmyany (Ašmena), Braslaw (Breslauja), Suwałki (Suvalkai).

== Reasons for the territorial changes ==
The redistribution of lands after World War II was based on the ethnicity of local populations – some of the territories that had a clear non-Baltic majority were attached to other republics; this, however, also happened to some territories which had a clear Baltic majority (many of them were enclaves in areas without a Baltic majority). In Latvia and Estonia, parts of territories which had not belonged to the Governorate of Estonia, the Riga Governorate, Vitebsk Governorate or the Courland Governorate within the Russian Empire were detached, but there is no evidence that this was a reason for the transfer of territory. In Lithuania's case, the detaching did not have any historical foundation.

== History of the territories after resumption of independence ==
Under the Soviet rule the territories that were added to the Russian SFSR and the Byelorussian SSR were largely Russified, due to insufficient support for Lithuanian, Latvian and Estonian languages, characterized by too few schools with curricula in these languages. They saw a significant migration of Russian-speaking people. In some of the territories that became part of Poland, Lithuanian language schools existed and still exist.

The territories were not returned to the Baltic states after they regained independence and remain parts of Russia, Belarus and Poland. In general, the official government policy of Latvia and Estonia is not to push the issue, but the territories' return is supported by some, usually marginal, organizations inside these countries, such as the Abreniešu apvienība (Abrenian Union) in Latvia.

=== Estonia ===
The Estonia-Russia border treaty had been signed in Moscow on 18 May 2005 and ratified by Estonia, but was not ratified by Russia — official reason for this was that Estonia's internal treaty ratification legislation passed by parliament mentioned the 1920 Treaty of Tartu (the treaty under which these territories were originally recognised as Estonian).

On 6 September 2005, the Russian Ministry of Foreign Affairs summoned Anne Härmaste, Chargé d'Affaires ad interim of Estonia in Russia, and handed her a note containing a notice of the intention of the Russian Federation to withdraw its signature and not to become a party to the Treaty Between the Russian Federation and the Republic of Estonia on the Russian-Estonian State Border and to the Treaty Between the Russian Federation and the Republic of Estonia on the Delimitation of the Sea Areas in the Narva Estuary and Gulf of Finland.

The Treaty of Tartu is considered to be a historical document of no legal power by Russia, while in Estonia the situation is different, as officially Estonia considers itself the continuation state of the interwar Estonia.

=== Latvia ===
It was assumed that the Russian-Latvian border treaty would be signed in 2005. In Latvia the opposition, primarily the organization Abreniešu apvienība consisting of people deported from Pytalovo and surroundings, lobbied for nationwide referendum on such treaty as they saw it as violating the constitution of Latvia (principle of territorial unity). The government ruled out a possibility of referendum, however the negotiations for border treaty were suspended by Russia after the Latvian parliament issued a declaration stating that Latvia was occupied by the Soviet Union and claiming material compensation from Russia for the period of occupation.

In an interview with Komsomolskaya Pravda in May 2005, President Vladimir Putin addressed the issue of Pytalovo, when he stated that Russia would not hold any negotiations with Latvia which involved territorial losses for Russia.

=== Lithuania ===
Lithuania immediately after independence recognised the borders established in 1940 as the borders of Lithuania and signed border agreements with Belarus and Poland. Relations with neighbouring Russia have been strained since then but maintain diplomatic alliance with Poland and Belarus.

== See also ==
- Baltic Russians
- Estonian War of Independence
- Latvian War of Independence
- Lithuanian Wars of Independence
- Reunification
- Territorial changes of Russia
