= Kachanovo =

Kachanovo (Russian: Качаново) is the name of several rural localities in Russia:

- Kachanovo, Ostrovsky District, Pskov Oblast, a village in Ostrovsky District, Pskov Oblast
- Kachanovo, Palkinsky District, Pskov Oblast, a selo in Palkinsky District, Pskov Oblast
- Kachanovo, Ryazan Oblast, a village in Pionersky Rural Okrug of Rybnovsky District of Ryazan Oblast
- Kachanovo, Tver Oblast, a village in Kuvshinovsky District of Tver Oblast
