= Pytalovsky District =

Pytalovsky District Пыталовский район (Russian)
- District
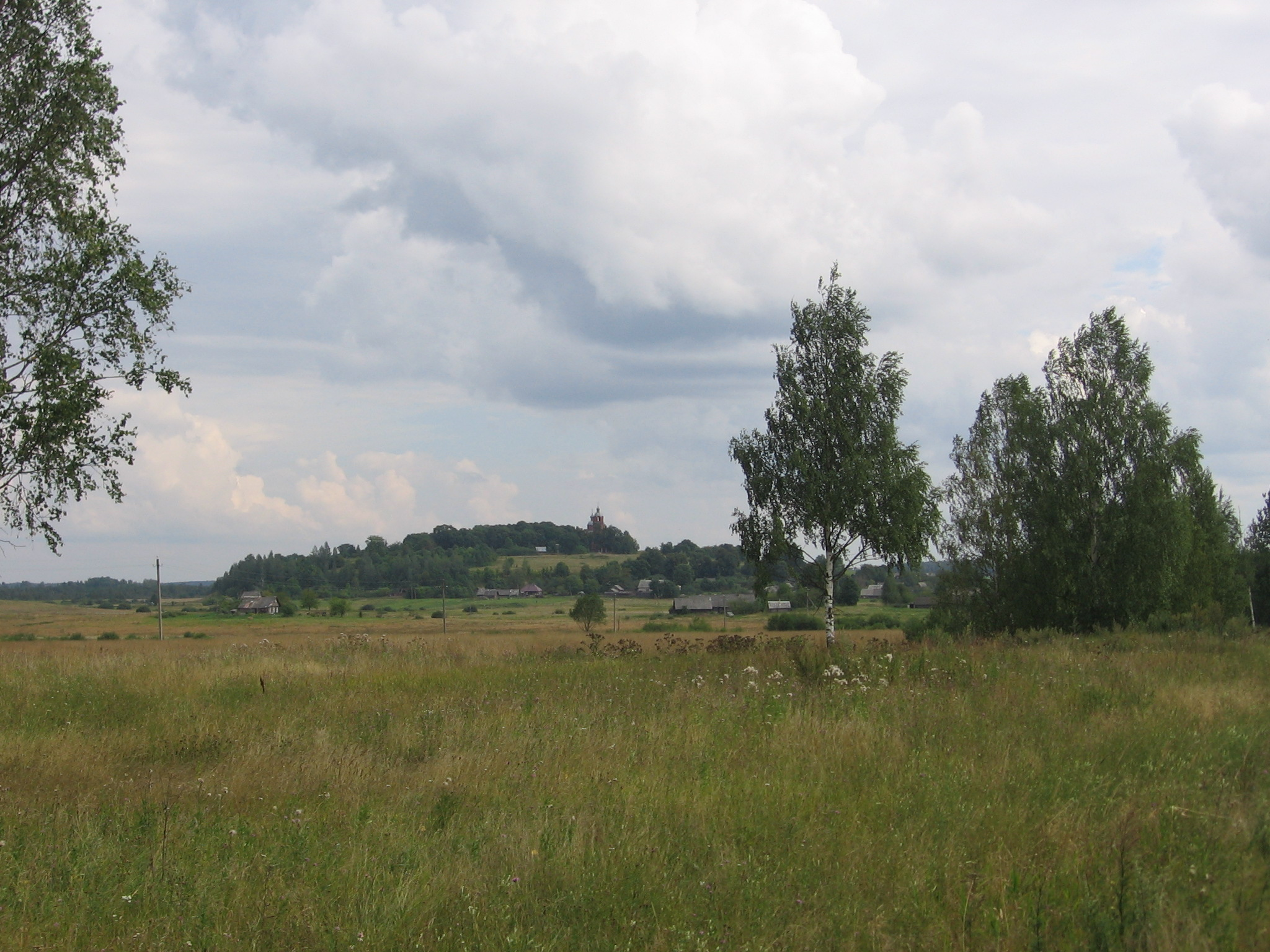
- Vyshgorodok, Pytalovsky District

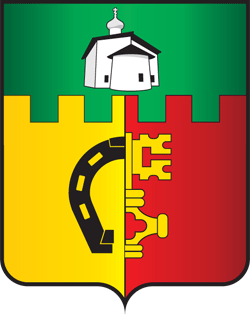
- Flag Coat of arms
- Location of Pytalovsky District in Pskov Oblast
- Coordinates: 57°04′N 27°54′E
- Country: Russia
- Federal subject: Pskov Oblast
- Established: 1945
- Administrative center: Pytalovo

Area
  - Total: 1,111 km^{2} (429 sq mi)

Population (2010 Census)
  - Total: 12,083
  - Density: 10.88/km^{2} (28.17/sq mi)
  - Urban: 48.2%
  - Rural: 51.8%

Administrative structure
  - Inhabited localities: 1 cities/towns, 327 rural localities

Municipal structure
  - Municipally incorporated as: Pytalovsky Municipal District
  - Municipal divisions: 1 urban settlements, 7 rural settlements
- Time zone: UTC+3 (MSK)
- OKTMO ID: 58653000
- Website: http://pytalovo.reg60.ru/

Pytalovsky District (Russian: Пыта́ловский райо́н; Latvian: Pitalovas rajons) is an administrative and municipal district (raion), one of the twenty-four in Pskov Oblast, Russia. It is located in the west of the oblast and borders with Palkinsky District in the north, Ostrovsky District in the east, Krasnogorodsky District in the south, and with Kārsava, Baltinava, and Viļaka municipalities of Latvia in the west. The area of the district is 1,111 square kilometers (429 sq mi). Its administrative center is the town of Pytalovo. Population: 12,083 (2010 census); 14,853 (2002 Census); 16,167 (1989 Soviet census). The population of Pytalovo accounts for 48.2% of the district's total population.

== Geography ==
The district is elongated in the meridional direction and lies in the basin of the Velikaya River and thus of the Narva River. Two of the main left tributaries of the Velikaya flow through the district, originating in Latvia. The Kukhva River crosses the northern part of the district and a stretch of it makes up a state border between Latvia and Russia. The Utroya River crosses the district from north to south, and the town of Pytalovo is located on the banks of the river. A major right tributary of the Utroya, the Lzha River, forms the border with Krasnogorodsky District.

== History ==
Pytalovo (the alternative name of which was Novo-Dmitrovskoye) was known as a village in Vyshgorodok volost, Ostrovsky Uyezd, Pskov Governorate since the end of the 18th century. In the course of World War I, in February 1918 the German Army advances on Pskov and Petrograd capturing western part of Pskov Governorate until November when the Red Army retook it. In January 1920 the western part of Ostrovsky uyezd was attacked by advancing Latvian republican units and the frontline as of noon 1 February 1920 was stipulated as the border demarcation line between the Latvian Republic and Russian Soviet Federative Socialist Republic.

According to the Treaty of Riga, signed on August 11, 1920, Russian SFR ceded Kachanovskaya, Tolkovskaya and Vyshgorodetskaya volosts (latter included Pytalovo) to Latvia. Annexed Pskovian municipalities were first merged into Ludza District of Latvia, but later with some northern-eastern Latvian municipalities (Balvi) separated into the newly established Abrene District. From 1925, Pytalovo was known as Jaunlatgale. In 1933, it was granted town status, and in 1938 renamed Abrene. In 1940, Latvia was occupied by Soviet Union, and the eastern part of Abrene District became a part of the Latvian Soviet Socialist Republic. Between August 1941 and August 1944, the area was occupied by German troops. After second Soviet occupation on January 16, 1945, the area that had been ceded to Latvia in 1920 was transferred from the Latvian Soviet Socialist Republic to Pskov Oblast, Abrene was renamed back to Pytalovo and Pytalovsky District with the administrative center in Pytalovo was created. In 1959, the district was abolished and split between Ostrovsky and Krasnogorodsky Districts; in 1965, it was re-established. After Latvia regained independence in 1991, it laid territorial claims on Pytalovsky District. In 2007, the treaty between Latvia and Russia recognized the existing border.

== Restricted access ==
The part of the district along the state border is included into a border security zone, intended to protect the borders of Russia from unwanted activity. In order to visit the zone, a permit issued by the local Federal Security Service department is required.

== Economy ==
=== Industry ===
As of 2003, only two industrial enterprises survived in the district—a textile factory and a printing house. A milk factory and a flax production factory, previously the biggest enterprises in the district, were defunct.

=== Agriculture ===
The main specializations of agriculture in the district are meat, milk, and egg production. Agriculture in the district experiences a deep crisis, with salaries below the poverty line and the production on a sharp decline.

=== Transportation ===
A railway from St. Petersburg via Pskov to Rēzekne in Latvia and further to Vilnius crosses the district from northwest to southeast. The main station within the district is Pytalovo. In Pytalovo, another railroad to Gulbene and Riga branches off west. As of 2012, there was passenger traffic on the railway.

The European route E262, from Ostrov to Kaunas via Rēzekne and Daugavpils crosses the district from northwest to southeast. Pytalovo is not on the road but is easily accessible from it. There are also local roads.

== Culture and recreation ==
The district contains three cultural heritage monuments of federal significance and additionally twenty-six objects classified as cultural and historical heritage of local significance. The federally protected monuments are the churches in the villages of Korovsk and Pustoye Voskresenye, as well as an archeological site.

Vyshgorodok, formerly a borderline castle and the municipal centre, is the oldest locality of the Pytalovo District mentioned in the written sources (1476 AD).

Pytalovo hosts an ethnographic museum focusing on Russian and Latgalian culture.
