= Abrene county =

Former county of Latvia

Abrene county Abrenes apriņķis
- County of Latvia
- 1924–1945
- Coat of arms

- Map in 1940
- Capital: Abrene
- History
  - Established: 1924
  - Disestablished: 1945
Preceded by	Succeeded by
Ludzas apriņķis	Pskov Oblast, Russian SFSR; Balvi district

Abrene county (Latvian: Abrenes apriņķis) was a county in the Republic of Latvia with an area of 4,292 square kilometers (1,657 sq mi) that was formed in 1925 from the northern part of the Ludza county as Jaunlatgale county (New Latgale county, Jaunlatgales apriņķis), but was renamed Abrenes apriņķis in 1938.

The district included the towns of Balvi and Abrene and 14 villages, and the civil parishes (Latvian: pagasti) of the district were reorganized thrice (there were 12 in 1929, 13 in 1935 and 15 in 1940).

During World War II, six eastern civil parishes – Purvmalas (Bakovo), Linavas (Linovo), Kacēnu (Kachanovo), Upmalas (Upmala), Gauru (Gavry) and Augšpils (Vyshgorodok), as well as the town of Abrene (a total area of 1293.6 square kilometers with 35,524 inhabitants) – were annexed to the Russian Soviet Federative Socialist Republic in 1944. That part of the former Abrene district is now part of Russia as the Pytalovsky district of Pskov Oblast and borders Latvia. "Abrene region" in current usage often treats the area joined to Russia as though it had comprised the entire district, which can be misleading since nearly three quarters of the former district are in Latvia, but multiple treatments of the transfer of the eastern pagasti by citing interbellum demographic statistics for the whole region, rather than by civil parish.

== History ==
The Abrene region was long a point of contact and friction between the Finno-Ugric, Baltic, and Slavic languages, cultures, tribes, and countries. The Russian name for the town and region, Pytalovo, probably derives from the Finno-Ugric tulva, "tributary, flood"; the region was part of Tolowa (or Tholowa; Latvian: Tālava), a kingdom of the northern Latgalians, which for a period paid tribute to Mstislav the Brave of Smolensk (from ca. 1180); the area became part of Livonia in 1224.

In the 1270s the area became a part of Livonia. The Balts east of a slight ridge at Viļaka were gradually russified from the 15–16th centuries, but the philologists August Johann Gottfried Bielenstein and Kārlis Mīlenbahs, conducting linguistic field research in the area in the late 19th and early 20th century, found that multiple people, called "Russian Latvians" by the local Russians, still spoke the High Latvian dialect.

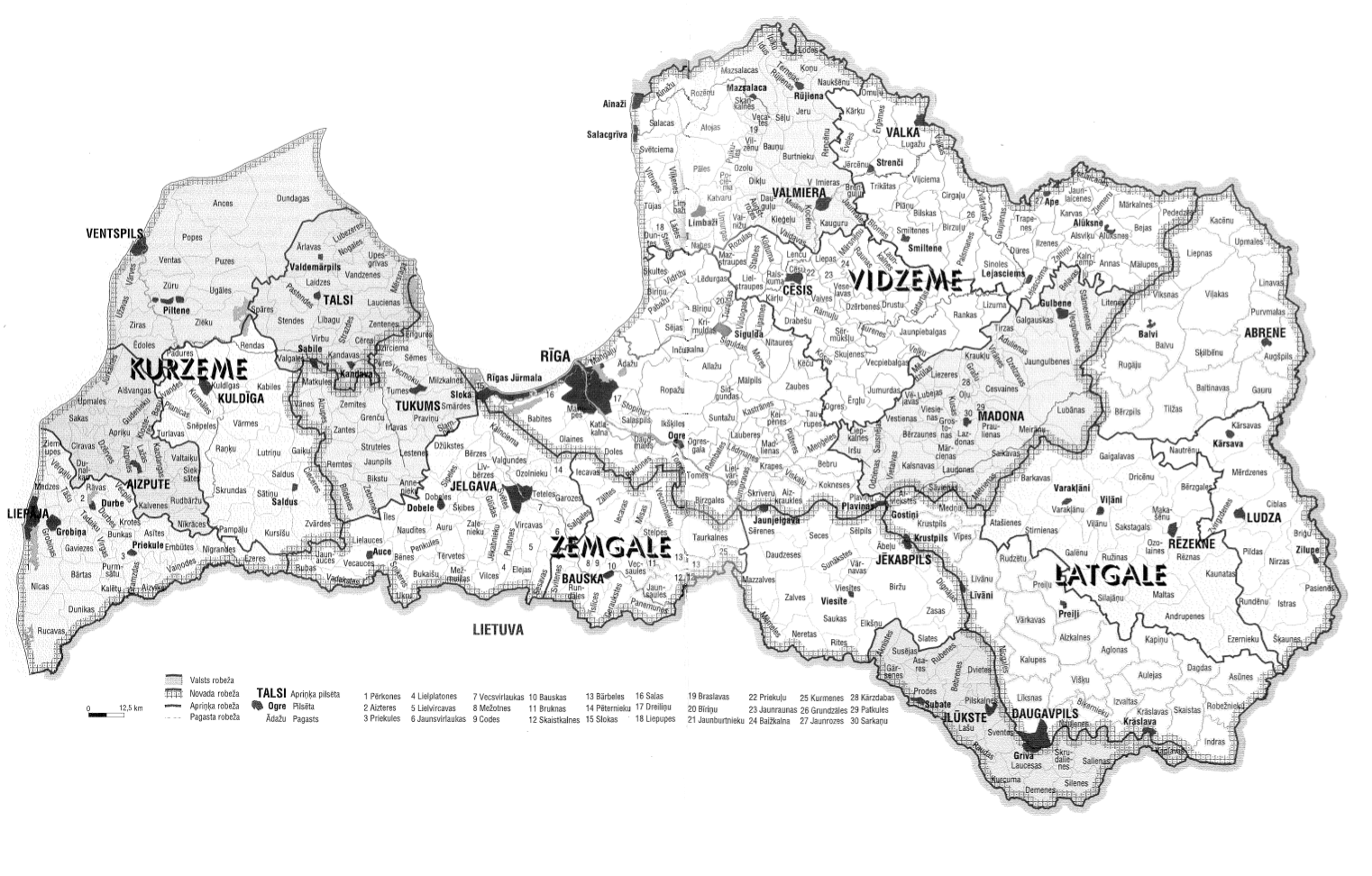
Abrenes apriņķis on the map of Latvia (1938)

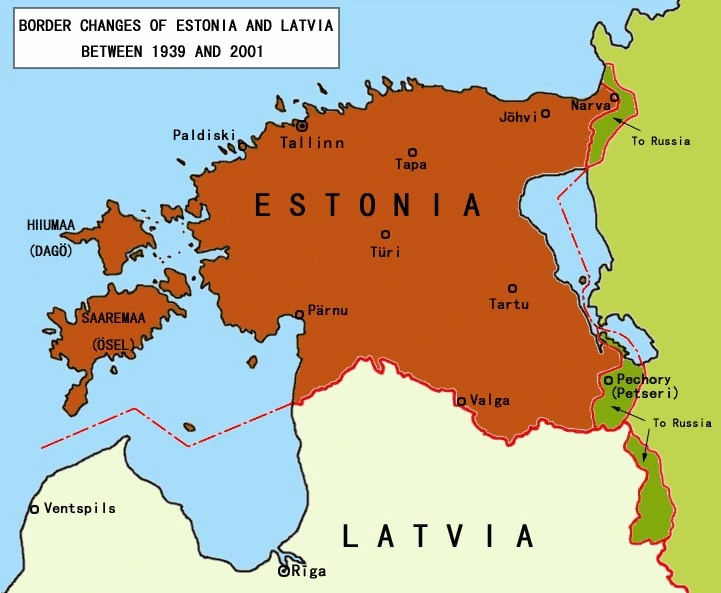
Border changes of Estonia and Latvia in 1944

After the Bolsheviks were driven from what is now Latvia and Soviet Russia recognized Latvia's independence, in August 1920, the border was not drawn alongside ethnographic lines: once the frontier was negotiated (the border was not finalized until 7 April 1923) large Russian and Belarusian communities were left on the Latvian side. Strategic concerns also played a part, because of an important railway junction within the Abrene region. The historian Edgars Andersons explains (in Latvijas vēsture 1914–1920 [Stockholm: Daugava, 1976]):

"Especially in the north, the Russians had agreed to the Latvians' strategic demands, not complaining about the ethnographic principle having been disregarded. Several civil parishes were completely Russian."

The population of the entire district in the census of 1935, divided by ethnicity, was as follows: 60,145 Latvians, 45,885 Russians, 1,558 Jews and 648 Belarusians. The demographics differed sharply on either side of the Viļaka ridge, which bisects the district – the eastern civil parishes had small ethnic Latvian minorities: 17% in Kacēnu pagasts, 5% in Linavas pagasts, 32% in Purvmalas pagasts, 5% in Augšpils pagasts, and 4% in Gauru pagasts. The civil parishes immediately to the west had strong Latvian majorities, ranging from 71% in Šķilbēnu pagasts to 91% in Viļakas pagasts. The town of Abrene itself, which developed around the Pytalovo railroad station, had 1,242 inhabitants, 484 of them ethnic Latvians.

The inhabitants held Latvian citizenship regardless of ethnicity. Parliamentary Latvia pursued a liberal policy of multiculturalism, guaranteeing education in minority languages from 1919. Modern schools providing bilingual instruction in Latvian, Russian, Belarusian, Yiddish and Latgalian were constructed (by 1936 there were 162 primary schools and 3 secondary schools in the district). The Latvianization policies of the authoritarian president Kārlis Ulmanis resulted in curtailing multiculturalism after 1934. A number of minority schools were closed. The Abrene district as a whole differed from most of Latvia by religion, too – it was 48% Orthodox, 38% Catholic, and 12% Lutheran.

With the Soviet occupation in 1940, the German invasion in 1941, the Holocaust, the return of Soviet forces in 1944, and the illegal mobilization of Latvian citizens by both occupying powers, severe demographic changes took place. The transfer of the eastern part of the district to the RSFSR was decided by a decree from the Presidium of the Supreme Soviet of the USSR, based on a request by the Presidium of the Supreme Soviet of the Latvian SSR, in violation of even Soviet law (the 1936 constitution then in force required that changes in internal borders be confirmed by the Supreme Soviet of the USSR, not the Presidium). Though the official documents transfer 1075.31 square kilometers, 1293.6 square kilometers were actually transferred.

The transfer was not formally finalized until 1946. The territory was subjected to forcible collectivization, accompanied by rampant robbery and destruction, including the demolition of farmsteads and mass mortality among livestock. Kulaks, nationalists, and "bandits" (often those accused of being Forest Brothers) were deported with their families (2728 persons in early 1949 and 1563 persons in May 1950), primarily to Krasnoyarsk. Officials from Russia proper replaced local administrators even at the village level, and even some who had fought for the Soviets were mistreated. In these circumstances, large numbers of people left for the Latvian SSR. Today there are substantial communities of former residents and their descendants in Balvi and Rīga. The former civil parishes joined to Russia are almost totally delatvianized.

== Border agreement ==
The Latvian constitution stipulates that the borders of the Republic are set by international treaties, and the government considers the 1920 Treaty of Rīga to be still in force. The 4 May 1990 declaration of independence (reinstating the 1920 constitution subject to a transitional period) by the Supreme Soviet of the Latvian SSR affirmed that the restored Republic of Latvia would base its relations with the Russian Federation on the treaty principle. In January 1991, the Russian Federation (while still in the USSR) and Latvia signed a document regulating their bilateral relations. The Latvian delegation attempted to include a reference to the 1920 treaty but the Russian delegation objected. In essence, Russia views Latvia as a newly independent country and consistently refuses to acknowledge that Latvia was occupied and illegally incorporated into the USSR, while Latvia insists upon the legal continuity of Latvian state occupied in 1940. Key players in post-war politics in the West never recognised or at least questioned the legality of the incorporation of Latvia into the USSR, but there is pressure on both countries to resolve the issue. This can be seen on the example of their attitude towards events from the beginning of the 20th century in Latvia. Thus, the European Community, for example, did not use the term "recognition" but referred to "the restoration of sovereignty and independence" when restoring diplomatic relations in 1991; the US to "the culmination of the USA’s 52 year refusal to accept the forcible incorporation of the independent Baltic States by the USSR". (See, for example, Roland Rich's paper for the Symposium on Recent Developments in State Recognition.).

The Latvian Foreign Ministry has reiterated "that Latvia has no territorial claims to the Russian Federation", however, and though there is some opposition (particularly among right wing parties) to formally ceding the Abrene region, surveys show that most Latvians do not believe that the transferred territory will ever again be administered by Latvia. Some in Latvia – especially the former residents of the areas now in Russia – are interested in seeking compensation from the Russian Federation, though. Currently, the Republic of Latvia compensates those who lost property. The former residents also complain of the difficulty of visiting their family graves, asking that the Latvian and Russian governments facilitate border procedures. Despite Latvia's assurances that it makes no territorial claims, Russian president Vladimir Putin claimed that Latvian wishes to get control of the area and that such claims are against the spirit of Europe. On 29 April 2005, Latvia announced that it would sign an interpretative declaration in conjunction with the proposed border agreement with Russia, noting that the border agreement would in no way affect "the legal rights of the Latvian state and its citizens" under the 1920 treaty. As a consequence, Russia scrapped the border agreement, as it saw this as attempt to prolong debate on Abrene.

In January 2007, the Latvian Parliament agreed to sign the treaty, making no open references to the 1920 treaty. By the end of 2007, the border treaty was ratified by both parties.

== See also ==
- Territorial changes of the Baltic states
- Masļenki border incident
