= Palkino, Palkinsky District, Pskov Oblast =

Palkino Палкино
- Work settlement
- Interactive map of Palkino
- Location of Palkino Palkino (Pskov Oblast)
- Coordinates: 57°32′30″N 28°00′30″E
- Country: Russia
- Federal subject: Pskov Oblast
- Administrative district: Palkinsky District
- Urban-type settlement status since: 1985

Population (2010 Census)
  - Total: 2,924
  - Estimate (2021): 2,870 (−1.8%)

Municipal status
  - Municipal district: Palkinsky Municipal District
  - Urban settlement: Palkino Urban Settlement
  - Capital of: Palkinsky Municipal District, Palkino Urban Settlement
- Time zone: UTC+3 (MSK)
- Postal codes: 182270, 181270
- OKTMO ID: 58637151051

Palkino (Russian: Палкино) is an urban locality (a work settlement) and the administrative center of Palkinsky District of Pskov Oblast, Russia, located 36 kilometers (22 mi) southwest of Pskov. Municipally, it is incorporated as Palkino Urban Settlement, the only urban settlement in the district. Population: 2,924 (2010 census); 3,201 (2002 census); 3,406 (1989 Soviet census).

== History ==
In the 19th century, Palkino was a selo, a seat of Palkinskaya Volost of Pskovsky Uyezd in Pskov Governorate. On August 1, 1927, the uyezds were abolished, and Palkinsky District was established, with the administrative center in Palkino. The governorates were abolished as well, and the district became a part of Pskov Okrug of Leningrad Oblast. On July 23, 1930, the okrugs were also abolished, and the districts were directly subordinated to the oblast. On September 20, 1931 Palkinsky District was abolished and merged into Ostrovsky District. On February 15, 1935, the district was re-established. Between March 22, 1935 and September 19, 1940, Palkinsky District was a part of Pskov Okrug of Leningrad Oblast, one of the okrugs abutting the state boundaries of the Soviet Union. Between August 1941 and July 1944, the district was occupied by German troops. On August 23, 1944, the district was transferred to newly established Pskov Oblast. On October 15, 1985 Palkino was granted status of an urban-type settlement.

== Economy ==
=== Transportation ===
Palkino is connected by roads to Pskov, to Ostrov, and to the highway connecting Pskov and Riga. The connection to Ostrov provides access to the M20 highway which connects St. Petersburg and Vitebsk via Pskov. There are also local roads.
