= Vyshgorodok =

Vyshgorodok Вышгородок
- Village
- Interactive map of Vyshgorodok
- Location of Vyshgorodok Vyshgorodok (Pskov Oblast)
- Coordinates: 57°01′57″N 28°00′10″E
- Country: Russia
- Federal subject: Pskov Oblast
- Administrative district: Pytalovsky District
- Founded: 1476

Population
  - Estimate (2000): 534 )
- Time zone: UTC+3 (MSK)
- Postal code: 181420
- OKTMO ID: 58653410168

Historical affiliations

Pskov Republic 1414–1510
Grand Duchy of Moscow 1510–1547
Tsardom of Russia 1547–1721
Russian Empire 1721–1917
Russian Republic 1917
Soviet Russia 1917–1920
(Latvia) Latvian Republic 1920–1940
Soviet Union 1940–1991
Russian Federation 1991–present

Vyshgorodok (Russian: Вышгородок; Latvian: Višgorodoka or Augšpils) is a selo ('village') in Gavry volost, Pytalovsky District of Pskov Oblast, Russia, founded in the 15th century as a borderline fortress.

== History ==
=== Pskov Republic ===
Between the 13th and 15th centuries, the Pskov Republic was engaged in border conflicts with the Livonian Order, Archbishopric of Riga and the Great Duchy of Lithuania. One of these resulted from the Orderial claims for the territories west of the Krasny Gorodok. With the truce of 1476, the Master of the Livonian Order Bernd von der Borch abandoned these claims.

The inhabitants of the Kokshiono parish, however, requested the veche (council) and the Prince of Pskov to secure the border through military means to save them from Livonian raids. In 1476 a wooden fortress was founded on the Lada river by two posadniks of Pskov – Alexey Vassilievich and Moisey Fyodorovich. Construction was completed in 1478. It had a limestone basement, two wooden watchtowers and gates on the edges facing Pskov and Livonia. The Germans, in turn, maintained their border castle of Marienhausen (now Viļaka) some 25 km (16 mi) to the west (since 1294).

In 1479 Livonian knights attacked Vyshgorodok, burning down the fortress and the church and killing the villagers. The next year, 1480, Livonians repeated their raid. Pskov called Muscovy for help and in 1482 joint forces responded with intrusion into the Livonian lands.

The fortress of Vyshgorodok was never restored, but the settlement developed and expanded into a town of Vyshgorodok, hosting the Pskovian garrison that watched the border. The town was ruled by the vicegerent appointed from Pskov and was an administrative center of the county consisting of eight parishes: Borisoglebskaya, Grivskaya, Kokshinskaya, Lebetskaya, Korovskaya Ovsitskaya, Yolkinskaya and Kukhovskaya.

=== Grand Duchy of Moscow, Tsardom of Russia, Russian Empire ===
In 1510 Pskov came under the rule of Muscovy. Part of its aristocracy suspected of disloyalty was moved to Vyshgorodok. To watch the border, the town had to maintain a garrison of local militia at its own expense.

In 1581 Polonian units led by King Stephen Báthory passed through Vyshdorodok to besiege Pskov.

In the late 17th century Vyshgorodok hosted two annual trade fairs.

In 1690 the settlement suffered a fire which destroyed much of the housing along the Kovno road.

In 1708 Vyshgorodok was listed in the newly established Saint Petersburg Governorate.

In 1719 Vyshgorodok was transferred to the Pskov Governorate.

Despite Vyshgorodok's name (literally 'town on the hill'), maps and plans of the 18th century list Vyshgorodok as a village.

In 1844 the first municipal school was opened in Vyshgorodok.

In 1897 another school opened by the church.

In 1846 a hospital was founded by the Ministry of the Interior.

In 1860 the Saint Petersburg–Warsaw Railway was built, passing 6 km (3.7 mi) north-west of Vyshgorodok, where a station was built in the village of Pytalovo. As result, Pytalovo gradually became the principal settlement of the county at the expense of Vyshgorodok.

In 1911 a library run by the local teacher Olga Levkovich was opened.

=== During World War I and the Russian Civil War ===
After the Bolshevik Government failed to finalize the Treaty of Brest-Litovsk with the Central Powers, the latter resumed their advance eastwards on Pskov and Petrograd, resulting in the village coming under German control.

Shortly after the October Revolution, the Soviets seized control over most of the Pskovian municipalities, including Vyshgorodok. Peasants seized plots of land from local landlords.

In the autumn of 1918 Vyshgorodok was recaptured by the Red Army.

In January 1920 Vyshgorodok was attacked by advancing Latvian republican units and the frontline as of noon 1 February 1920 was stipulated as the border demarcation line by the Latvian–Soviet Peace Treaty between the Latvian Republic and Russian Soviet Federative Socialist Republic, which left Vyshgorodok with Latvia.

=== Latvian Republic and Latvian SSR ===
From 1920 to 1924 Vyshgorodok belonged to Ludza county. In 1925 it was renamed Augšpils (a Latvian translation of the original name) and made part of Pytalovo (1925–1938 Jaunlatgale, 1938–1944 Abrene) county which also contained other territories of the Pskov Governorate annexed to Latvia by the Treaty of 1920.

In 1927 the municipal school of Vyshgorodok was reconstructed to accommodate two schools for Russian and Latvian speakers.

In 1940 the Soviet Union annexed the Latvian Republic and established the Latvian Soviet Socialist Republic (LSSR) within its existing borders as of 1920, so Vyshgorodok belonged to Soviet Latvia.

From July 1941 until June 1944, Vyshgorodok was part of the Nazi occupation zone covered by the Reichskommissariat Ostland, Generalbezirk Lettland, Gebietskommissariat Dünaburg.

=== Russian SFR and Russian Federation ===
In January 1945 the border between the Russian SFR and Latvian SSR was redrawn to resemble the historical border between the imperial Governorates of Pskov, Livonia and Vitebsk. Vyshgorodok was made part of the Pytalovo district of the Pskov oblast. The district of Pytalovo was briefly (1959–1965) discontinued, leaving Vyshgorodok in the district of Ostrov.

Agrarian reform carried out during the late 1940s and 1950s converted local private farming into a state-owned collective farm (sovkhoz Leninskiy) headquartered in Vyshgorodok. It leased the required machinery from the MTS in Pytalovo up to the 1960s, as the MTS system was abandoned and machines were distributed among local collective farms.

Soon after the USSR collapsed in 1991, the collective farm was privatized and later closed.

== Pustoshniki ==
During the second half of the 19th and early 20th centuries, the western part of the Pskov Governorate including Vyshgorodok experienced major inbound migration from the Baltic provinces, where the serfdom was abandoned half a century earlier than across the rest of Russia. Latvian and Estonian peasantry with no means to buy enough land from their landlords were forced to seek cheaper options available right across the Eastern border of the Governorate of Livonia.

According to the 1911 statistical reference book for the Ostrov county of the Pskov Governorate, Vysgorodok parish accommodated 1,800 immigrants who either purchased (pustoshniki) or leased plots of land, 300 of whom were from Livonia and Estonia.

== Facilities and transport ==
The village hosts a school, kindergarten, post office and paramedical office.

Vyshgorodok is located at the intersection of the 58K-306 road connecting Ostrov to the border with Latvia and roads to Pytalovo and Kokshino. Regular bus service to Ostrov, Pytalovo and Pskov is available.

== Boris and Gleb Church ==
Initially constructed in the 15th century, it was destroyed by Livonian knights in 1479. In 1690 the church was rebuilt as two adjacent log houses. By the late 19th century it had deteriorated and in 1891 a new red brick church building was completed, having inherited the old altar. Funds to complete the construction of the church were given by Ostrovian landlord Vladimir Izyetdinov, and later by the Rukavishnikov family. The church has survived throughout the period of Latvian governance and during the communist rule.

== Gallery ==
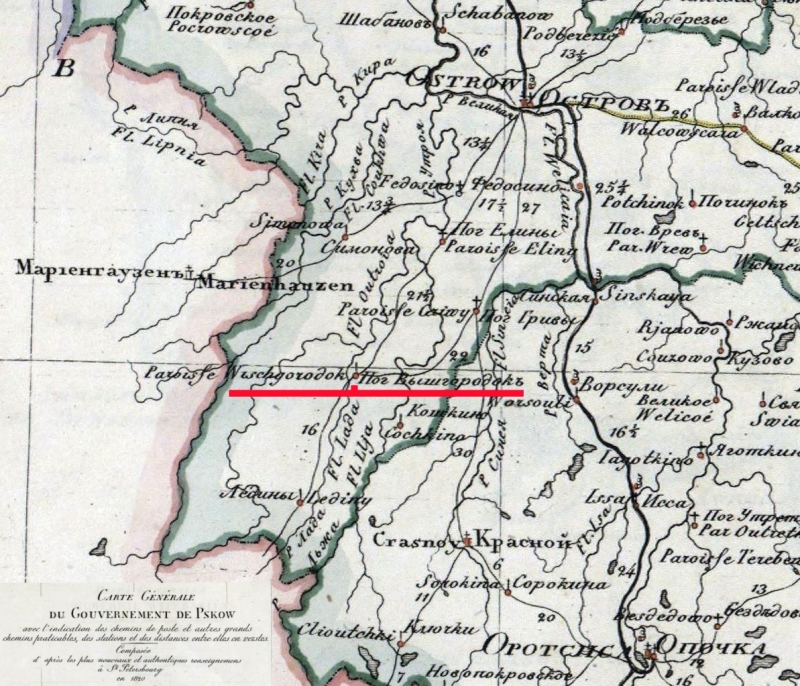
Vyshgorodok on the Pskov Governorate map, 1820

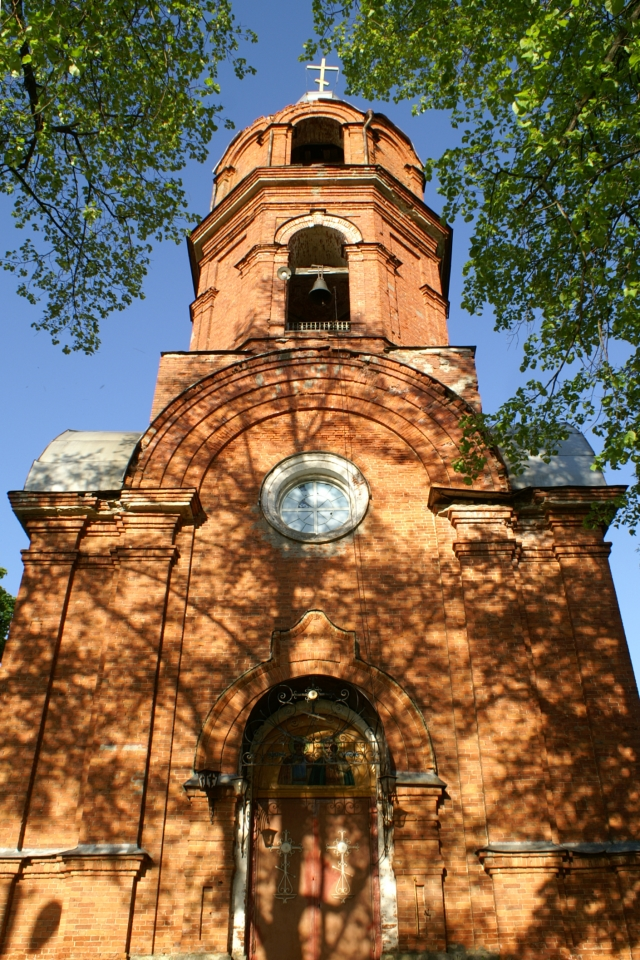
Russian Orthodox church in Vyshgorodok, Pskov Oblast'

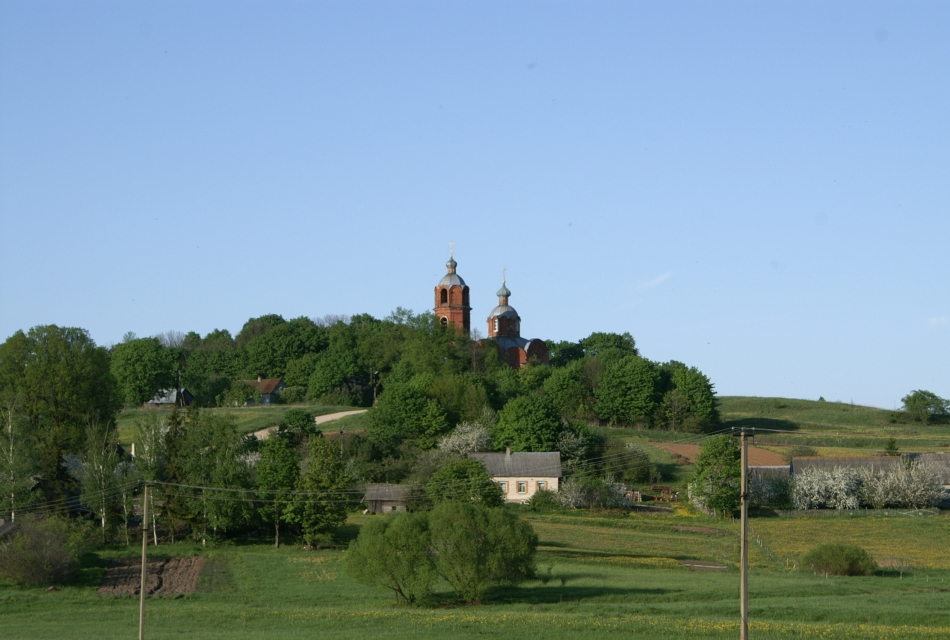
Hill fort of Vyshgorodok and its posad

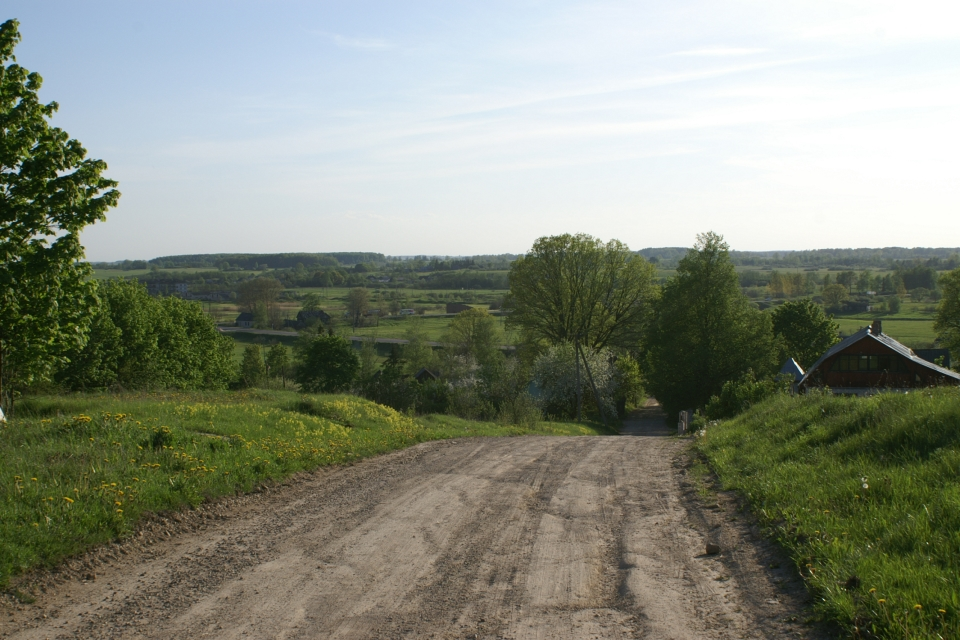
Westward view from the Vyshgorodok hill fort

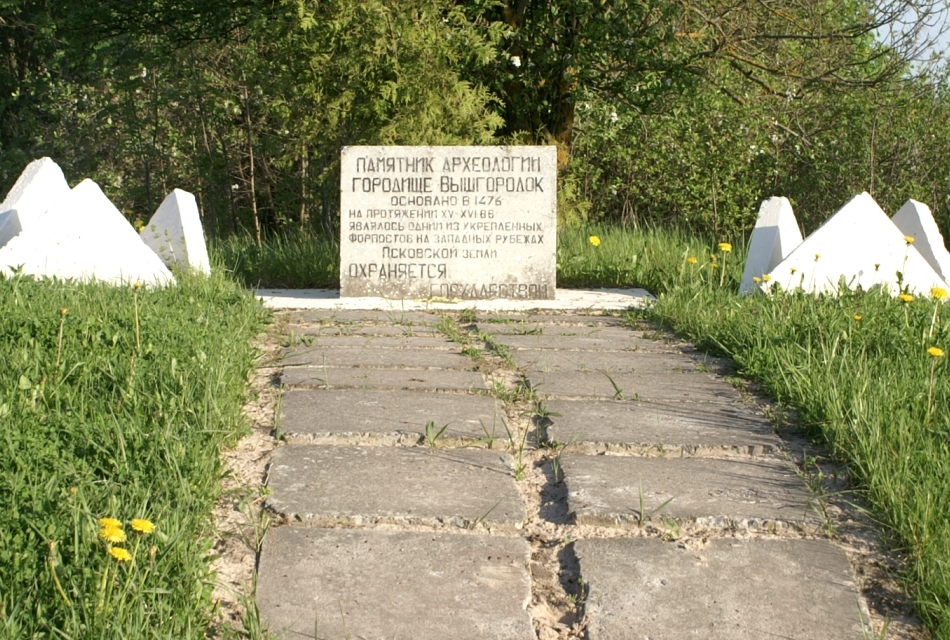
A memorial stone of the Vyshgorodok hill fort that reads "An archeological monument – Vyshgorodok hill fort. Founded in 1476. During the 15th–16th centuries it was one of the fortifications on the westernmost frontier of the Pskovian Land. Preserved by the Government."
