= Klavdiya Nazarova =

Soviet partisan (1920–1942)

Klavdiya Ivanovna Nazarova
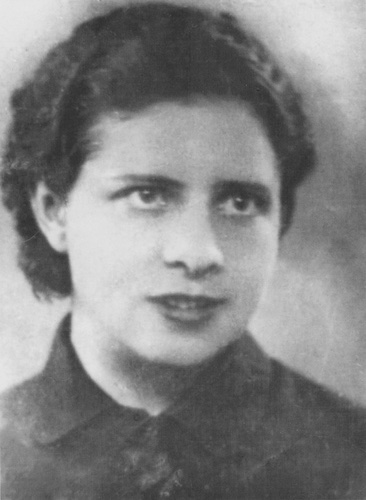
- Native name: Клавдия Ивановна Назарова
- Born: 1 October 1920; Ostrov, Russian SFSR
- Died: 12 December 1942 (aged 22) Ostrov, Russian SFSR
- Allegiance: Soviet Union
- Awards: Hero of the Soviet Union

Klavdiya Ivanovna Nazarova (Russian: Кла́вдия Ива́новна Наза́рова; 1 October 1920 – 12 December 1942) was an organizer of an underground Komsomol partisan unit in Ostrov during the Second World War who was posthumously awarded the title Hero of the Soviet Union on 20 August 1945 after she was executed by the Germans.

== Civilian life ==
Nazarova was born on 1 October 1920 to a Russian peasant family in Ostrov city of Pskov Governorate. Her father died from complications of a wound sustained in World War I when Klavdiya was at a young age. In addition to completing ten grades of school she attended the Lesgaft National State University of Physical Education, Sport and Health of Leningrad for one year and was a senior leader of a Young Pioneer detachment at a local school. She was a member of the Komsomol. In her later years she worked as a seamstress.

== Partisan activities ==
Shortly after the German invasion of the Soviet Union in 1941 Nazarova signed up for training to become a nurse but was soon appointed by the District Party Committee as the deputy commander of a youth paramilitary battalion assigned to tracking down and capturing Axis paratroopers entering the city. However the group was overrun by numerically superior forces and most members of the unit fled Ostrov after the German occupation began. In July 1941 Nazarova hosted a group of resistance members in her apartment, and the group decided that she should be the official leader of the partisan detachment they had formed. Initially they gathered weapons for Soviet prisoners of war and partisans and helped injured Red Army soldiers find their way to Soviet-controlled territory by providing them with maps, compasses, weapons, and provisions while they were in a hospital where Nazarova worked as a nurse. Later they managed to get their hands on blank passports and provided the prisoners with forged versions of documents they were required to carry by German authorities. The group began engaging in reconnaissance activities after one of the partisans began working at a German mess hall, and even took the risk of posting leaflets listing atrocities committed by the German military at a local Wehrmacht headquarters. The unit's sabotage operations included cutting telephone cables, setting fire to office buildings and barracks, derailing trains, and even causing regular power outages after one of the partisans began working at a power plant. The group's most crucial activities consisted of stealing a map of plans for the Leningrad blockade and providing the Soviet Airforce with information of the location of a fuel depot for bombing.

A group of several people loyal to the partisans were caught while trying to cross the border into Soviet-controlled territory. One killed herself by swallowing poison but two of the Red Army soldiers that were captured revealed the names of the partisans under torture. The partisans were arrested and on 12 December 1942 Nazarova was publicly executed by the Germans in the Ostrov city square. After she was hanged her lifeless corpse was left on the gallows for three days before she was buried. On 20 August 1945 she was posthumously declared a Hero of the Soviet Union.

== See also ==
- List of female Heroes of the Soviet Union
- Soviet partisans
