= Kukhva =

River in Latvia and Russia

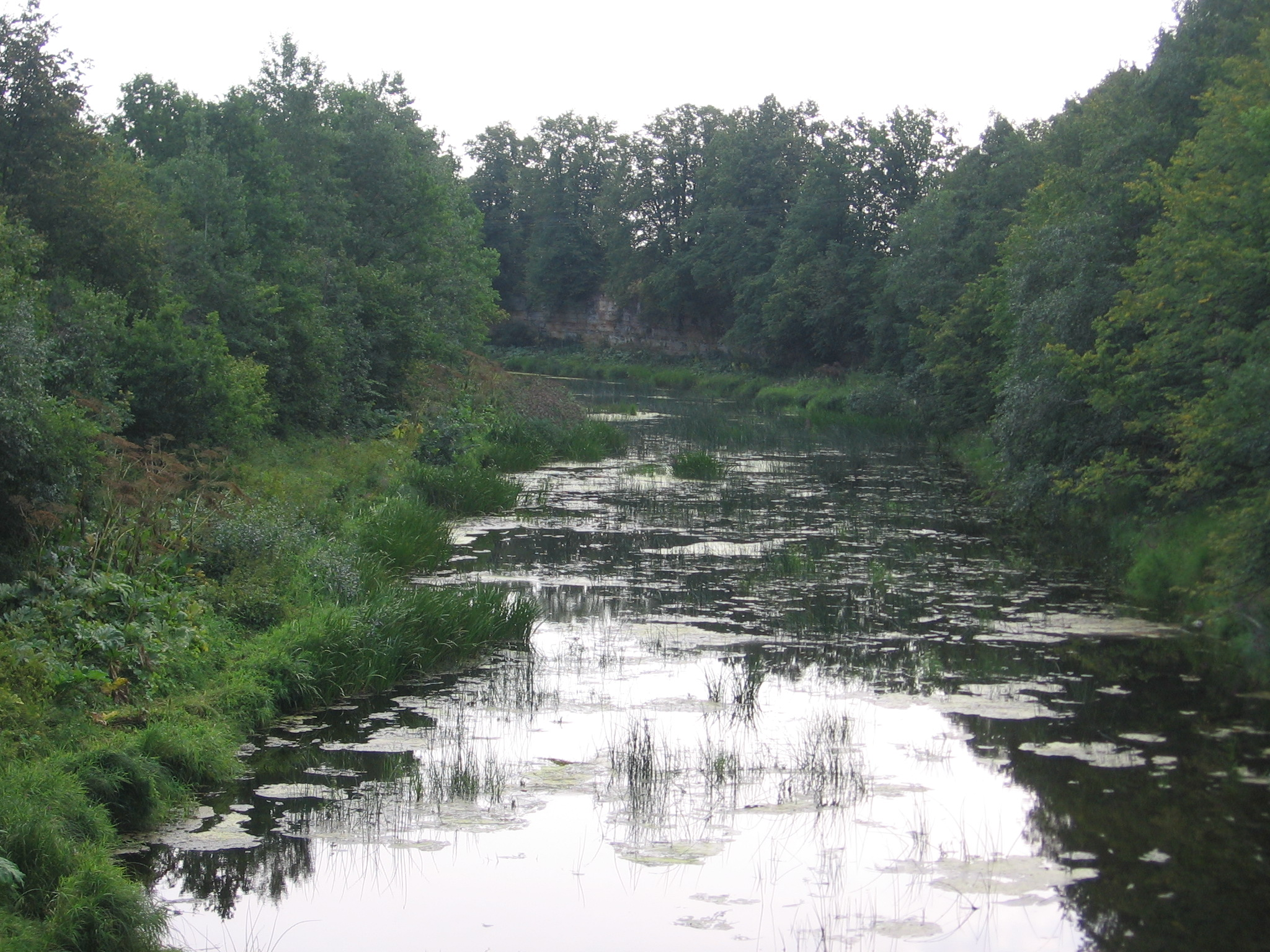
- The Kukhva in the Pytalovsky District
- Native name: Кухва (Russian); Kūkova (Latvian)

Location
- Country: Latvia, Russia

Physical characteristics
- Source
  - location: Lake Numerne
  - elevation: 107 m (351 ft)
- Mouth: Velikaya
  - coordinates: 57°22′28″N 28°09′47″E
- Length: 106 km (66 mi)
- Basin size: 828 km^{2} (320 sq mi)

Basin features
- Progression: Velikaya→ Lake Peipus→ Narva→ Gulf of Finland

The Kukhva (Latvian: Kūkova, Russian: Кухва) is a river in Kārsava, Baltinava, and Viļaka municipalities of Latvia and in Pytalovsky and Ostrovsky Districts of Pskov Oblast in Russia. It is a left tributary of the Velikaya. It is 106 kilometres (66 mi) long, and the area of its basin 828 square kilometres (320 sq mi).

The source of the Kukhva is Lake Numerne in eastern Latvia. The river flows north, and a stretch of it forms part of the international border between Latvia and Russia. The Kukhva further north departs from the border, crosses the northern part of Pytalovsky District of Pskov Oblast, forms the border between Ostrovsky and Pytalovsky District, turns east and crossing Ostrovsky District where it joins the Velikaya from the left. The mouth of the Kukhva is in the village of Trushki.

The drainage basin of the Kukhva comprises areas in northeastern Latvia, as well as in the north of Pytalovsky District and in the west of Ostrovsky District of Pskov Oblast in Russia.
