= Palkino, Gryazovetsky District, Vologda Oblast =

Palkino Палкино
- Village
- Location within Vologda Oblast Location within Russia
- Coordinates: 59°00′N 40°08′E
- Country: Russia
- Region: Vologda Oblast
- District: Gryazovetsky District
- Time zone: UTC+3:00

Palkino (Russian: Палкино) is a rural locality (a village) in Pertsevskoye Rural Settlement, Gryazovetsky District, Vologda Oblast, Russia. The population was 186 as of 2002. There are five streets.

== Geography ==
Palkino is located 20 km north of Gryazovets (the district's administrative centre) by road. Baksheyka is the nearest rural locality.
