= Palkino, Vladimir Oblast =

Palkino Палкино
- Village
- Location within Vladimir Oblast Location within Russia
- Coordinates: 56°19′N 42°06′E
- Country: Russia
- Region: Vladimir Oblast
- District: Vyaznikovsky District
- Time zone: UTC+3:00

Palkino (Russian: Палкино) is a rural locality (a village) in Gorod Vyazniki, Vyaznikovsky District, Vladimir Oblast, Russia. The population was 164 as of 2010.

== Geography ==
Palkino is located 13 kilometres (8.1 mi) north of Vyazniki (the district's administrative centre) by road. Kozlovo is the nearest rural locality.
