= Pytalovo =

Town in Pskov Oblast, Russia

Pytalovo Пыталово
- Town
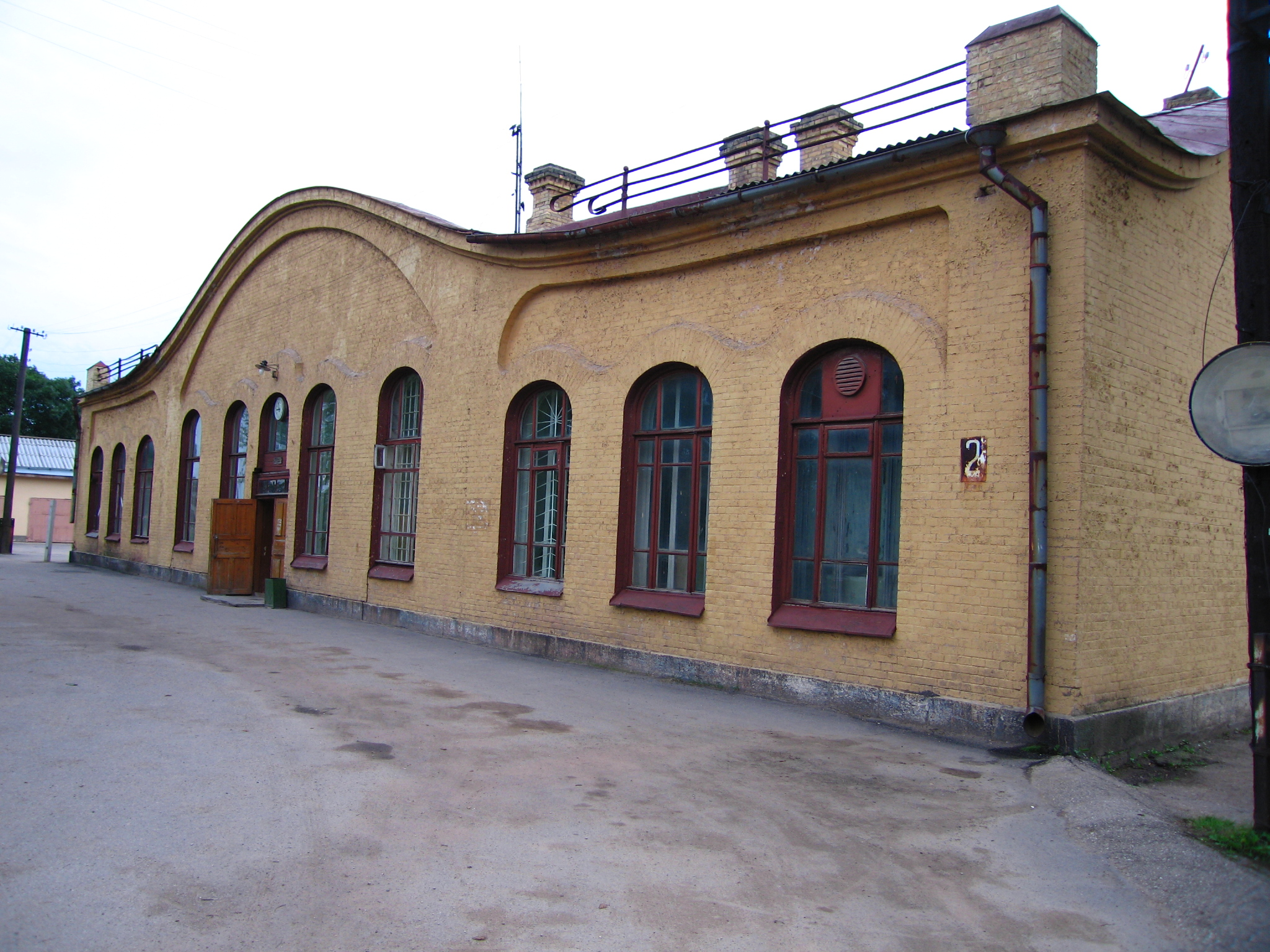
- Railway station

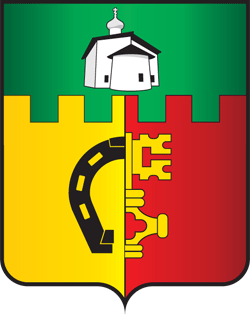
- Coat of arms
- Interactive map of Pytalovo
- Location of Pytalovo Pytalovo (Pskov Oblast)
- Coordinates: 57°04′N 27°55′E
- Country: Russia
- Federal subject: Pskov Oblast
- Administrative district: Pytalovsky District
- Known since: the end of the 18th century
- Town status since: 1933
- Elevation: 80 m (260 ft)

Population (2010 Census)
  - Total: 5,826
  - Estimate (2021): 5,263 (−9.7%)

Administrative status
  - Capital of: Pytalovsky District

Municipal status
  - Municipal district: Pytalovsky Municipal District
  - Urban settlement: Pytalovo Urban Settlement
  - Capital of: Pytalovsky Municipal District, Pytalovo Urban Settlement
- Time zone: UTC+3 (MSK)
- Postal code: 181410
- Dialing code: +7 81147
- OKTMO ID: 58653101001

Pytalovo (Russian: Пыта́лово; Latvian: Pitalova or Abrene) is a town and the administrative center of Pytalovsky District in Pskov Oblast, Russia, located on the Utroya River (a tributary of the Velikaya), 102 kilometers (63 mi) southwest of Pskov, the administrative center of the oblast. Population: 5,826 (2010 census); 6,806 (2002 census); 7,166 (1989 Soviet census).

It was previously known as Pytalovo or Novo-Dmitrovskoye (until 1925), Jaunlatgale (until 1938), Abrene (until 1945).

== Etymology ==
The main theory is that Pytalovo is Russified form of the Latvian toponym "Pietālava" (Latvian "pie Tālavas", or Latgalian "pī Tuolavas"), meaning "near Tālava", with Tālava being the name of an ancient Latvian feudal state, dating back to 13th century. Russophones comprised the majority of the population in a number of parishes during Latvia's initial independence, with further Russification ongoing. Nevertheless, the older generation testified to their Latvian heritage. Historian Carl von Stern wrote of a cultural awakening amongst the region's inhabitants in the 1930s despite generations of Russification. Two thousand inhabitants from across Pskov gathered in September 1934 and proclaimed: "We are not Russian, but, indeed, Latvian. We are returning to our Latvian heritage. Latvians, lend us your helping hand, support and hasten our return!" A more concrete testament to Pytalovo's Latvian heritage is that the Latvian folk costumes of the region are the only ones which still preserve the most ancient tradition of white dress, once used in both daily life and for festive occasions.

Other theories about the origin of the town's name are offered by the unofficial Russian Pytalovo website. One is that it was named after Lieutenant Pytalov, a guard to Catherine the Great, who received the lands in 1766 for reasons unknown, that estate subsequently being sold off by his descendants. The other is that the name is derived from the Russian verb "пытать" (meaning "to torture"), named after a church courtyard with a large iron cross used to torture and execute people.

== History ==
Historical affiliations

Tālava 901-1240
Teutonic Order 1240–1558
Kingdom of Livonia 1558–1583
Polish-Lithuanian Commonwealth 1583-1626
(yes) Swedish Empire 1626-1710
Tsardom of Russia 1710–1721
Russian Empire 1721–1917
Latvian Provisional National Council 1917-1918
Russian Republic 1918-1918
German Empire 1918–1918
Russian Soviet Federative Socialist Republic 1918–1920
Republic of Latvia 1920–1940
Latvian SSR 1940-1941
Nazi Germany 1941-1944
Latvian SSR 1944-1945
Russian Soviet Federative Socialist Republic 1945–1991
Russian Federation 1991–present

Pytalovo, alternatively known as Novo-Dmitrovskoye (Ново-Дмитровское), a rural locality in Vyshgorodok volost, Ostrovsky Uyezd, Pskov Governorate, had been known since the end of the 18th century. In the last quarter of the 19th century, it had a population of 59. It grew significantly after gaining a railway station by a newly constructed railway branch.

In February 1918 the German Army advances on Pskov and Petrograd capturing Pytalovo until fall 1918, when the Red Army retakes it. In January 1920 Pytalovo was attacked by advancing Latvian republican units and the frontline as of noon 1 February 1920 was stipulated as the border demarcation line by the Latvian–Soviet Peace Treaty between the Latvian Republic and Russian Soviet Federative Socialist Republic. By the Latvian–Soviet Peace Treaty of 1920, the western part of Ostrovsky Uyezd, including Pytalovo, was passed to Latvia.

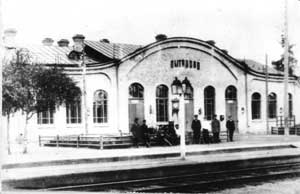
Early 20th-century view of the railway station

In 1925, Latvians renamed it Jaunlatgale, which it was known as until 1938, when the name was changed to Abrene. In 1933, it was granted town status. During the interwar period, it was the administrative center of Abrene District. After the annexation of Latvia by the Soviet Union in 1940, the town originally remained a part of the Latvian SSR. During World War II, the town was occupied by the German Army from July 5, 1941 until July 22, 1944 and administered as part of the Generalbezirk Lettland of Reichskommissariat Ostland. On January 16, 1945, the town and the surrounding areas were transferred to Pskov Oblast of the Russian SFSR and Pytalovsky District was established. At the same time, the town's original name (Pytalovo) was restored.

Whether the region is historically Russian or Latvian became a highly politicized issue after Latvia restored its independence in 1991 and a border dispute erupted with Russia over the region. The Abrene District, constituting roughly 2% of Latvia's territory, was transferred to the Russian SFSR in 1945, but it had originally been a part of Russia and ceded to Latvia only a quarter century earlier, in 1920. Russian President Vladimir Putin infamously proclaimed in 2005 that Latvia "will get the ears of a dead donkey but not Pytalovo [Abrene]". The border dispute was not resolved until 2007, when a treaty between Latvia and Russia recognizing the existing border was signed.

== Administrative and municipal status ==
Within the framework of administrative divisions, Pytalovo serves as the administrative center of Pytalovsky District, to which it is directly subordinated. As a municipal division, the town of Pytalovo is incorporated within Pytalovsky Municipal District as Pytalovo Urban Settlement.

== Economy ==
=== Industry ===
As of 2003, only two industrial enterprises survived in Pytalovo—a textile factory and a printing house. A milk factory and a flax production factory, previously the biggest enterprises in the district, were defunct.

=== Transportation ===
Pytalovo is an important railway station on the railway from St. Petersburg via Pskov to Rēzekne in Latvia and further to Vilnius. In Pytalovo, another railway to Gulbene and Riga branches off west. As of 2012, there was passenger traffic on the railway.

Pytalovo has an easy access to the European route E262, from Ostrov to Kaunas via Rēzekne and Daugavpils.

== Culture ==
Among places of interest in town Pytalovo there is a railway station building built in the modernist style in the early 20th century, the wooden building of the functioning St. Nicholas Church built in 1931, the post office building (early 20th century), and the house of merchant Ilyin (built in the 1920s).

Pytalovo is home to an ethnographic museum focusing on Russian and Latgalian cultures.

== Sources ==
- Псковское областное Собрание депутатов. Закон №833-оз от 5 февраля 2009 г. «Об административно-территориальном устройстве Псковской области». Вступил в силу со дня официального опубликования. Опубликован: "Псковская правда", №20, 10 февраля 2009 г. (Pskov Oblast Council of Deputies. Law #833-oz of February 5, 2009 On the Administrative-Territorial Structure of Pskov Oblast. Effective as of the official publication date.).
- Псковское областное Собрание депутатов. Закон №420-оз от 28 февраля 2005 г. «Об установлении границ и статусе вновь образуемых муниципальных образований на территории Псковской области», в ред. Закона №1542-ОЗ от 5 июня 2015 г. «О внесении изменений в Закон Псковской области "Об установлении границ и статусе вновь образуемых муниципальных образований на территории Псковской области"». Вступил в силу со дня официального опубликования. Опубликован: "Псковская правда", №41–43, №44–46, №49–51, 4 марта 2005 г., 5 марта 2005 г., 11 марта 2005 г. (Pskov Oblast Council of Deputies. Law #420-oz of February 28, 2005 On Establishing the Borders and the Status of the Newly Formed Municipal Formations on the Territory of Pskov Oblast, as amended by the Law #1542-OZ of June 5, 2015 On Amending the Law of Pskov Oblast "On Establishing the Borders and the Status of the Newly Formed Municipal Formations on the Territory of Pskov Oblast". Effective as of the official publication date.).
- Архивный отдел Псковского облисполкома. Государственный архив Псковской области. "Административно-территориальное деление Псковской области (1917–1988 гг.). Справочник". (Administrative-Territorial Structure of Pskov Oblast (1917–1988). Reference.) Книга I. Лениздат, 1988
