= Palkino, Arkhangelsk Oblast =

Palkino Малая Липовка
- Village
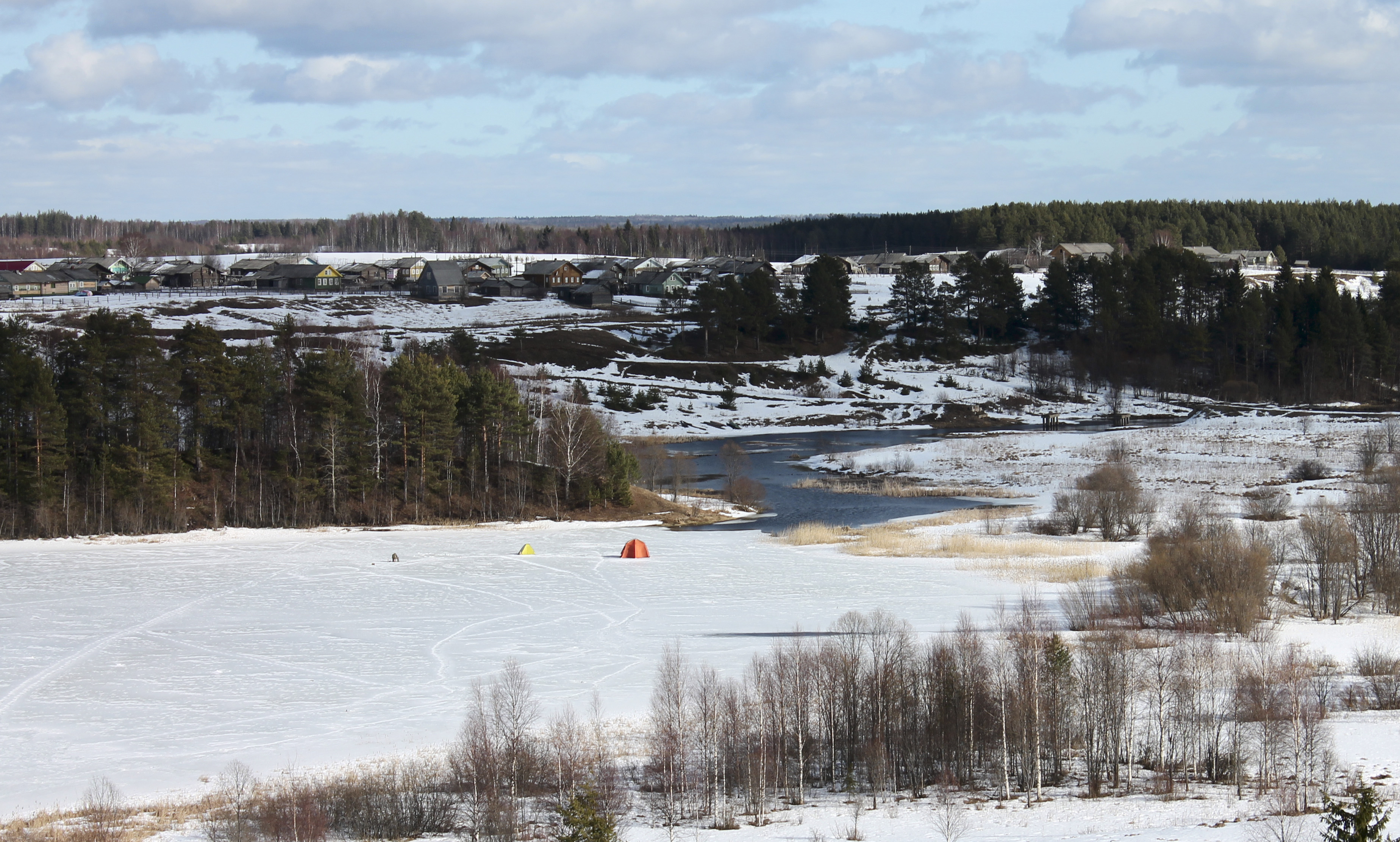

- Location within Arkhangelsk Oblast Location within Russia
- Coordinates: 61°29′N 41°38′E
- Country: Russia
- Region: Arkhangelsk Oblast
- District: Velsky District
- Time zone: UTC+3:00

Palkino (Russian: Палкино) is a rural locality (a village) in Lipovskoye Rural Settlement of Velsky District, Arkhangelsk Oblast, Russia. The population was 25 as of 2014. There are 3 streets.

== Geography ==
Palkino is located 111 km northwest of Velsk (the district's administrative centre) by road. Tuymino is the nearest rural locality.
