= Ostrov, Ostrovsky District, Pskov Oblast =

Town in Pskov Oblast, Russia

Ostrov Остров
- Town
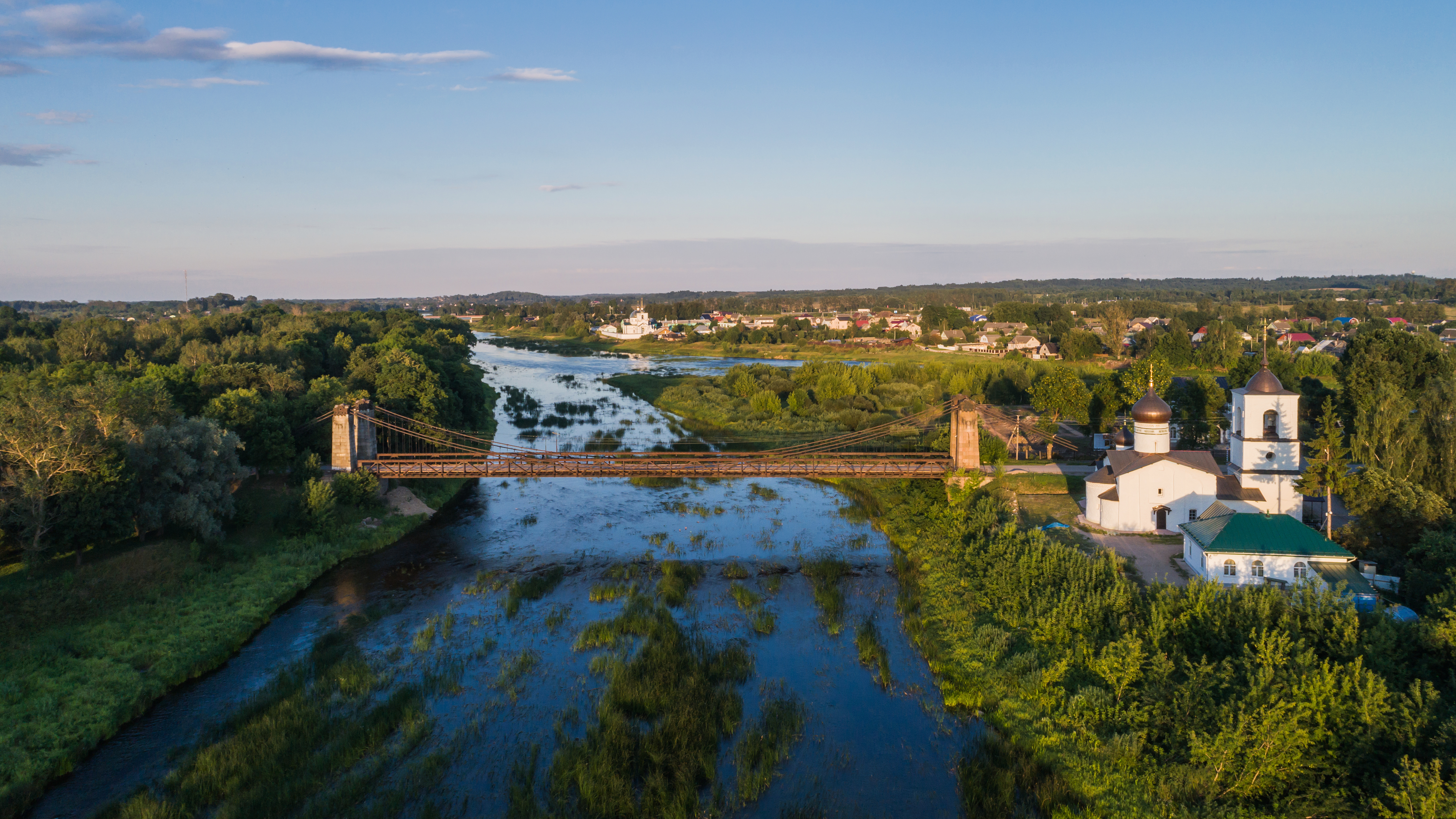

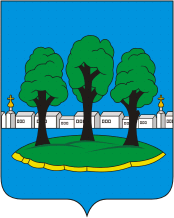
- Coat of arms
- Interactive map of Ostrov
- Location of Ostrov Ostrov (European Russia) Ostrov (Russia)
- Coordinates: 57°21′N 28°21′E
- Country: Russia
- Federal subject: Pskov Oblast
- Administrative district: Ostrovsky District
- Founded: 1341 (Julian)
- Elevation: 60 m (200 ft)

Population (2010 Census)
  - Total: 21,668
  - Estimate (2021): 20,923 (−3.4%)

Administrative status
  - Capital of: Ostrovsky District

Municipal status
  - Municipal district: Ostrovsky Municipal District
  - Urban settlement: Ostrov Urban Settlement
  - Capital of: Ostrovsky Municipal District, Ostrov Urban Settlement
- Time zone: UTC+3 (MSK)
- Postal codes: 181350, 181352, 181353, 181359
- OKTMO ID: 58633101001

Ostrov (Russian: О́стров, lit. island) is a town and the administrative center of Ostrovsky District in Pskov Oblast, Russia, located on the Velikaya River, 55 kilometers (34 mi) south of Pskov, the administrative center of the oblast. Population: 21,668 (2010 census); 25,078 (2002 census); 29,060 (1989 Soviet census); 27,000 (1974).

== Etymology ==
The name of the town, which means "island" in Russian, originates from the island on the Velikaya, on which the Ostrov fortress was originally built.

== History ==
It was founded as a fortress in the end of the 13th century and first mentioned in 1342. It had been an important military outpost throughout the 15th-16th centuries. In 1501 it was conquered by the Livonian Order after the Battle of the Siritsa River. In 1582 it was captured by Polish forces of Jan Zamoyski.

In the course of the administrative reform carried out in 1708 by Peter the Great, it was included into Ingermanland Governorate (known since 1710 as Saint Petersburg Governorate). Ostrov is specifically mentioned as one of the towns making the governorate. In 1727, separate Novgorod Governorate was split off and in 1772, Pskov Governorate (which between 1777 and 1796 existed as Pskov Viceroyalty) was established. Catherine the Great incorporated it as a town in 1777. In 1897, the ethnic make-up, by mother tongue, was 80.1% Russian, 11.8% Jewish, 2.5% German, 2.0% Polish, 1.7% Latvian.

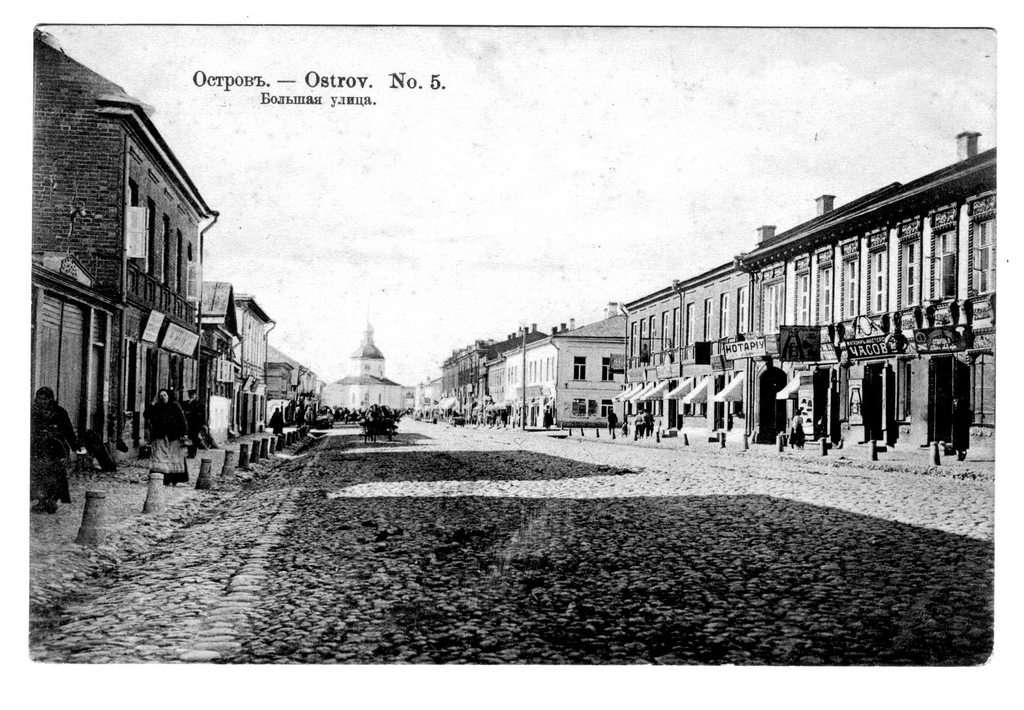
Bolshaya Street in 1917

On August 1, 1927, the uyezds and governorates were abolished and Ostrovsky District, with the administrative center in Ostrov, was established as a part of Pskov Okrug of Leningrad Oblast. It included parts of former Ostrovsky, Opochetsky, and Pskovsky Uyezds. On July 23, 1930, the okrugs were also abolished and the districts were directly subordinated to the oblast. Between March 22, 1935 and September 19, 1940, Ostrovsky District was a part of the restored Pskov Okrug of Leningrad Oblast, one of the okrugs abutting the state boundaries of the Soviet Union. Between July 6, 1941 and July 21, 1944, Ostrov was occupied by German troops. An underground resistance group was active in Ostrov during the war. On August 23, 1944, the district was transferred to newly established Pskov Oblast.

== Administrative and municipal status ==
Historical population
Year	Pop.	±%
1897	6,268	—
1989	29,060	+363.6%
2002	25,078	−13.7%
2010	21,668	−13.6%

Within the framework of administrative divisions, Ostrov serves as the administrative center of Ostrovsky District, to which it is directly subordinated. As a municipal division, the town of Ostrov is incorporated within Ostrovsky Municipal District as Ostrov Urban Settlement.

== Economy ==
=== Industry ===
The economy of Ostrov is based on food, electronic, and textile industries (5.4%).

=== Transportation ===
A railway from St. Petersburg via Pskov to Pytalovo and further to Rēzekne in Latvia passes Ostrov. In Latvia, it provides access to Riga and Vilnius (via Daugavpils). As of 2012, there was passenger traffic on the railway.

The M20 Highway, which connects St. Petersburg and Vitebsk via Pskov, passes Ostrov as well. Ostrov is the northern terminus of the European route E262, which proceeds to Kaunas via Rēzekne and Daugavpils. There are also road connections from Ostrov northwest to Pechory via Palkino, northeast to Porkhov, and southeast to Novorzhev, as well as local roads.

== Military ==
The town was home to Ostrov air base, a major medium-range bomber base during the Cold War. In addition, a unit of the Strategic Rocket Forces (RVSN) included a main base in the town, a nearby fixed field site for training, and three operational missile launch areas 10–30 km away. This military unit also supported reserve officer training of students of several institutes, including Moscow Institute of Physics and Technology.

== Culture and recreation ==
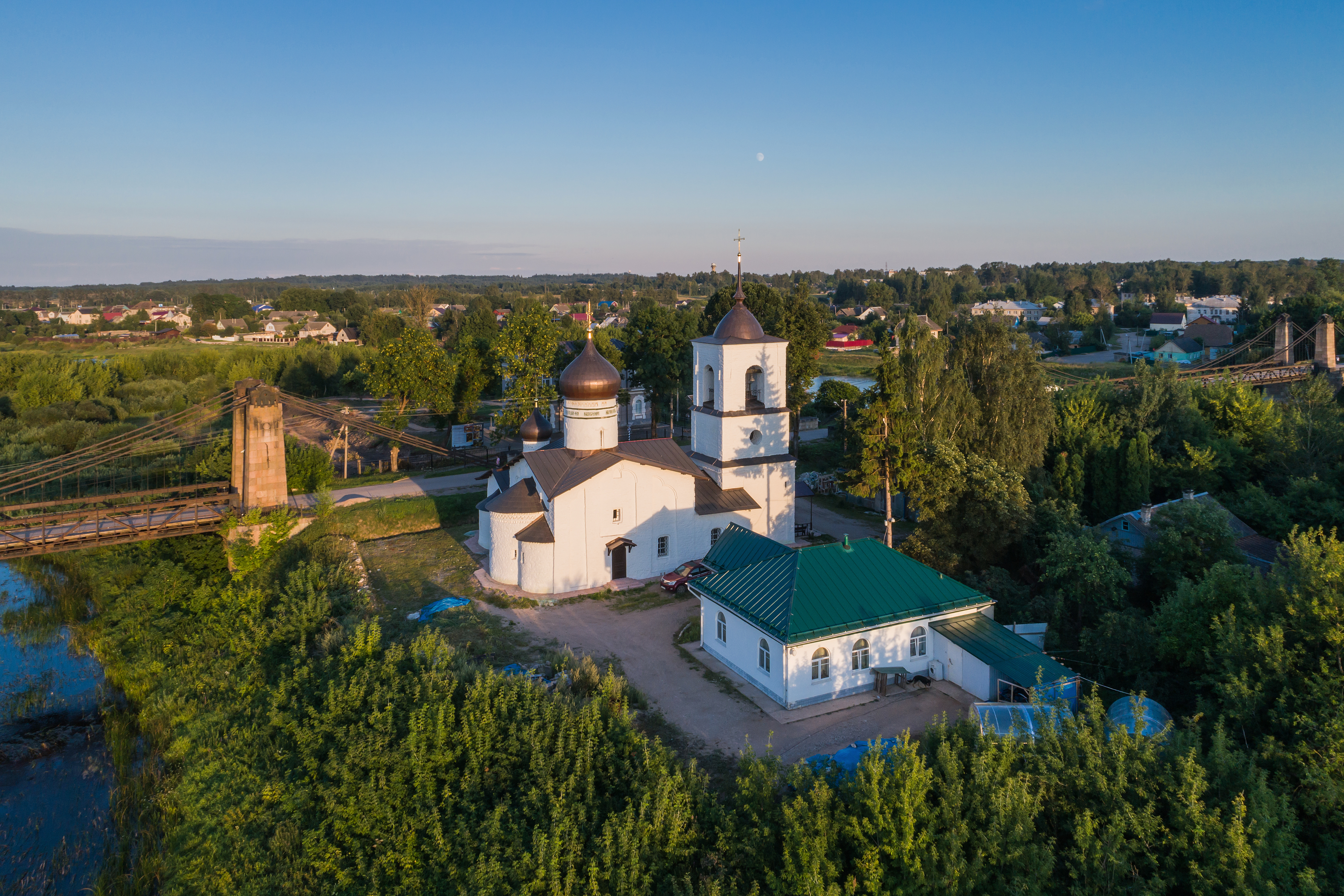
St. Nicholas Church in Ostrov

The town possesses a Neoclassical cathedral from 1790 and a typical Pskovian church from 1543. Close at hand is a historical suspension bridge, opened in 1853 (winter view, summer view).

Ostrov hosts the Ostrov District Museum, the only museum in the district.
