= Ostrovsky Uyezd =

Ostrovsky Uyezd (Островский уезд) was one of the subdivisions of the Pskov Governorate of the Russian Empire. It was situated in the northwestern part of the governorate. Its administrative centre was Ostrov.

== Demographics ==
At the time of the Russian Empire Census of 1897, Ostrovsky Uyezd had a population of 161,877. Of these, 96.5% spoke Russian, 1.8% Latvian, 0.6% Polish, 0.5% Yiddish, 0.2% German, 0.2% Estonian, 0.1% Romani and 0.1% Finnish as their native language.
