= Latvian–Soviet Peace Treaty =

1920 treaty ending the Latvian War of Independence

Treaty of Riga
Latvian-Soviet Peace Treaty
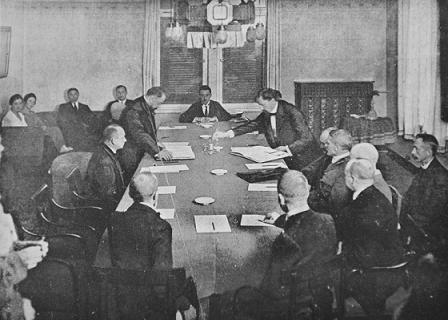
- Type: Peace treaty
- Signed: 11 August 1920; 105 years ago
- Location: Riga, Latvia
- Expiry: 1940 (beginning of the Occupation of Latvia)
- Parties: Latvia; Russian SFSR

The Latvian–Soviet Peace Treaty, also known as the Treaty of Riga, was signed on 11 August 1920 by representatives of the Republic of Latvia and Soviet Russia. It officially ended the Latvian War of Independence.

In Article II of the treaty, Soviet Russia recognised the independence of Latvia as inviolable "for all future time".

== Timeline ==
- 11 November 1918: The end of World War I
- 18 November 1918: Republic of Latvia is proclaimed
- 1 December 1918: The Red Army invades Latvia
- 17 December 1918: The Latvian Socialist Soviet Republic is formed
- 13 January 1920: Government of the Latvian Socialist Soviet Republic resigns
- 1 February 1920: A ceasefire between Russia and Latvia is signed
- 11 August 1920: The Latvian–Soviet Peace Treaty is signed
- 4 October 1920: Ratifications are exchanged in Moscow and the treaty goes into effect.

== Background ==
After World War I, Soviet Russia wanted to regain Latvia, since it had once been a part of the Russian Empire. The Red Army invaded Latvia in 1918 after the Latvian prime minister, Karlis Ulmanis, declared its independence. The Red Army was able to capture the capital, Riga, and a Soviet Government replaced Ulmanis. Germany sent troops to help Latvia oust the Bolshevik troops, but after this was accomplished the Germans refused to leave, in violation of the Treaty of Versailles. After the Estonian Army 3rd Division expelled the German troops, the Soviet troops once again advanced onto Riga. These troops were pushed out of Latvia by early 1920. A Latvian–Soviet Peace Treaty then formally ended Latvia's War for Independence.

== Provisions ==
The treaty had twenty-three articles and dealt with the sovereignty of the state of Latvia. The first article stated that "The state of war existing between the Parties shall be ended as of the effective date of this Peace Treaty." Article 2 declared the independence and sovereignty of Latvia and Article 3 set the borders of the State of Latvia, while also creating deadlines by which foreign troops should leave. Articles 4–6 dealt with military affairs and war damage, Article 7 with provisions for the return of prisoners of war, should they desire to return. Articles 8 through 9 concerned citizenship, repatriation of refugees, and property claims. Adults aged 18 or older were free to choose either Latvian or Russian citizenship, the default being that individuals were citizens of the state in which they resided at the time the treaty was signed. Articles 11 through 16 dealt with reparations Russia was to make to the Latvian state and its citizens. Articles 17 and 18 dealt with commercial, transit, postal and navigation arrangements and Article 19 with diplomatic relations. Article 20 address nationality issues and Article 21 established a commission to handle issues of mutual interest. Articles 22 and 23 deal with treaty technicalities such as language and ratification.

== Effects ==
While the treaty included provisions for reparations, Latvia had no practical recourse for recovering its industrial infrastructure, much of which had been taken to Russia. Agriculture and the requisite land reform became the focus for economic development in the new state.

== See also ==
- Latvian War of Independence
- History of Latvia Independence
- Soviet–Lithuanian Peace Treaty
- Treaty of Tartu (Estonia–Russia)
- Treaty of Tartu (Finland–Russia)
- Peace of Riga (Poland, Soviet Russia and Soviet Ukraine)

== Bibliography ==
- Embassy of Latvia (American). N.p., n.d. Web. 1 February 2010.
- Kohn, George Childs. “Treaty of Riga (1920).” Dictionary of Historic Documents. Revised ed. Modern World History Online. Web. 27 January 2010.
- Laserson, Max. “The Recognition of Latvia.” The American Journal of International Law 37.2 (1943): 233–247.JSTOR. Web. 1 February 2010.<https://www.jstor.org/‌stable/‌2192414?seq=3&Search=yes&term=treaty&term=peace&term=soviet&term=Latvia&list=hide&searchUri=%2Faction%2FdoBasicSearch%3FQuery%3Dlatvia%2Bsoviet%2Bpeace%2Btreaty%26gw%3Djtx%26prq%3Dlatvian-soviet%2Bpeace%2B&cookieSet=1>.
- Latvian Institute Website. Latvian Institute, n.d. Web. 1 February 2010.<http://www.li.lv/>.
- “Peace Treaty between Latvia and Russia.” Ministry of Foreign Affairs Website. Ministry of Foreign Affairs of the Republic of Latvia, n.d. Web. 1 February 2010.<http://www.mfa.gov.lv/‌en/‌policy/‌peace-treaty/>.
- Phillips, Charles, and Alan Axelrod. “Latvian War of Independence.” Encyclopedia of Wars. Vol. 2. Modern World History Online. Web. 27 January 2010.<http://www.fofweb.com/‌NuHistory/‌default.asp?ItemID=WE53&NewItemID=True>.
- Rislakki, Jukka. “Was Independence a Present?” The Case for Latvia: Disinformation Campaigns Against a Small Nation: Fourteen Hard Questions and Straight Answers about a Baltic Country. N.p.: Rodopi, n.d. 87–94. Google Books. Web. 1 February 2010.<https://books.google.com/‌books?id=yXANj6Y_7goC&printsec=frontcover&source=gbs_navlinks_s#v=onepage&q=&f=false>.
