= R23 highway (Russia) =

Federal highway in Russia

Federal Highway R23
- Федеральная автомобильная дорога Р23
- Psykov Highway; Kiev Highway

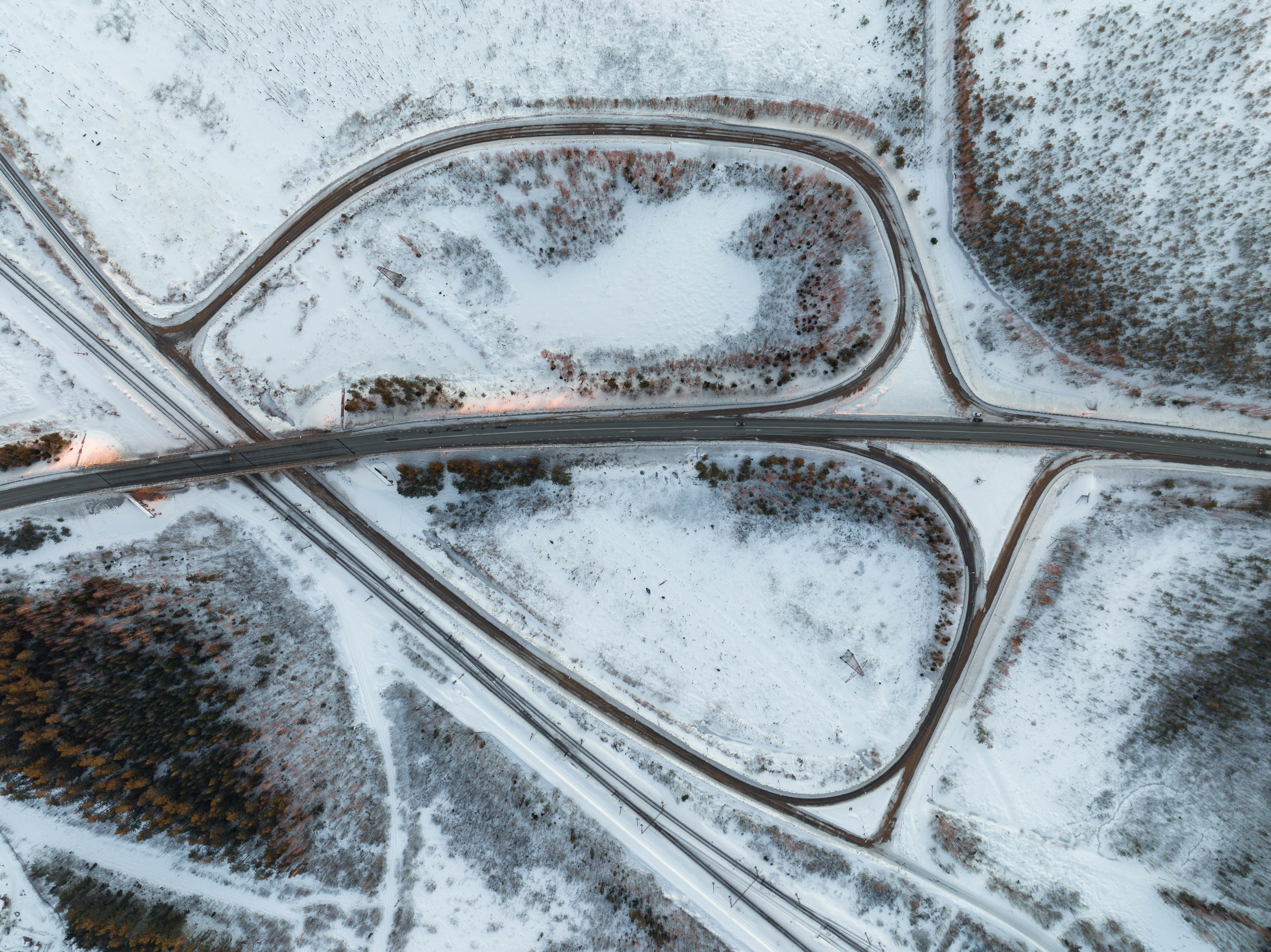

Route information
- Part of E95

Major junctions
- North end: A 118 in Saint Petersburg
- South end: Belarusian border south of Lobok

Location
- Country: Russia

Highway system
- Russian Federal Highways

Russian route R23 or Pskov Highway Russian: Федера́льная автомоби́льная доро́га Р23 «Псков» is a Russian federal motorway that runs from Saint Petersburg through Pskov until the border with Belarus. It is part of European route E95. Before 2018 the route was designated as M20. Since Soviet times it has sometimes been called "Kiev Highway".
