= Pskovsky Uyezd =

Subdivision of the Pskov Governorate

Pskovsky Uyezd (Псковский уезд) was one of the subdivisions of the Pskov Governorate of the Russian Empire. It was situated in the northwestern part of the governorate. Its administrative centre was Pskov.

== Demographics ==
At the time of the Russian Empire Census of 1897, Pskovsky Uyezd had a population of 103,300. Of these, 87.5% spoke Russian, 7.8% Estonian, 1.7% Latvian, 0.9% Polish, 0.9% German, 0.7% Yiddish, 0.3% Finnish, 0.1% Romani and 0.1% Belarusian as their native language.
