= Staraya Toropa =

Staraya Toropa Старая Торопа
- Work settlement
- Interactive map of Staraya Toropa
- Location of Staraya Toropa Staraya Toropa (Tver Oblast)
- Coordinates: 56°16′42″N 31°40′6″E
- Country: Russia
- Federal subject: Tver Oblast
- Administrative district: Zapadnodvinsky District

Population (2010 Census)
  - Total: 1,995
  - Estimate (2021): 1,603 (−19.6%)

Municipal status
  - Municipal district: Zapadnodvinsky Municipal District
  - Urban settlement: Staraya Toropa Urban Settlement
  - Capital of: Staraya Toropa Urban Settlement
- Time zone: UTC+3 (MSK)
- Postal code: 172630
- OKTMO ID: 28616153051

Staraya Toropa (Russian: Ста́рая Торо́па) is an urban-type settlement in Zapadnodvinsky District of Tver Oblast, Russia. It is located on the right bank of the Toropa River. Population: 1,995 (2010 census); 2,306 (2002 census); 2,802 (1989 Soviet census).

== History ==
Staraya Toropa was founded in 1901 as a settlement serving a railway station on the railway connecting Moscow and Ventspils. In 1906, Toropets railway station was opened on the railway connecting Bologoye and Velikiye Luki, and to avoid confusion, Toropa was renamed Staraya Toropa. It belonged to Toropetsky Uyezd of Pskov Governorate.

On August 1, 1927, the uyezds were abolished, and Oktyabrsky District was established, with the administrative center in Staraya Toropa. Pskov Governorate was abolished as well, and the district became a part of Velikiye Luki Okrug of Leningrad Oblast. The district center was subsequently moved to the settlement of Zapadnaya Dvina. On June 17, 1929, the district was transferred to Western Oblast. On July 23, 1930, the okrugs were also abolished and the districts were directly subordinated to the oblast. On January 29, 1935 Kalinin Oblast was established, and Oktyabrsky District was transferred to Kalinin Oblast. Between October 1941 and January 1942, Staraya Toropa was occupied by German troops. On August 22, 1944, the district was transferred to newly established Velikiye Luki Oblast. On October 2, 1957, Velikiye Luki Oblast was abolished, and Oktyabrsky District was transferred back to Kalinin Oblast. On February 13, 1963 it was merged with a part of Nelidovsky District to form Zapadnodvinsky District, with the administrative center in Zapadnaya Dvina. In 1990, Kalinin Oblast was renamed Tver Oblast.

== Economy ==
=== Industry ===
In Staraya Toropa, there is a factory which produces cheese and butter.

=== Transportation ===
The railway which connects Moscow and Riga via Rzhev, passes Staraya Toropa. There is infrequent passenger traffic. In 1942, narrow-gauge railways from Staraya Toropa to Toropets and to Nivy were constructed, to facilitate transport to the military units during World War II. They were subsequently demolished.

The M9 highway connecting Moscow with Riga passes just north of Staraya Toropa. There is also access to Toropets in the north. The road which connects Staraya Toropa with the M9 continues south to Ilyino.

== Culture and recreation ==
Staraya Toropa contains eight cultural heritage monuments of local significance. These are monuments to soldiers fallen in World War II as well as an archaeological site.

There is a local museum in Staraya Toropa.
