= Olenino, Tver Oblast =

Work settlement in Tver Oblast, Russia

Olenino Оленино
- Work settlement
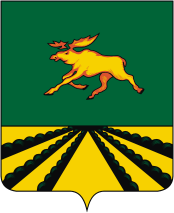
- Coat of arms
- Interactive map of Olenino
- Location of Olenino Olenino (Tver Oblast)
- Coordinates: 56°12′15″N 33°28′39″E
- Country: Russia
- Federal subject: Tver Oblast
- Administrative district: Oleninsky District
- railway station: 1898

Population (2010 Census)
  - Total: 2,433
  - Estimate (2021): 4,704 (+93.3%)

Administrative status
  - Capital of: Firovsky District

Municipal status
  - Municipal district: Oleninsky Municipal District
  - Urban settlement: Urban Settlement Olenino
  - Capital of: Oleninsky Municipal District, Urban Settlement Olenino
- Time zone: UTC+3 (MSK)
- Postal code: 172400
- OKTMO ID: 28644151051

Olenino (Russian: Оле́нино) is an urban locality (an urban-type settlement) and the administrative center of Oleninsky District of Tver Oblast, Russia, located 178 kilometers (111 mi) southwest of Tver on the federal "Baltic" highway (Moscow–Riga). Population: 4,918 (2010 census); 5,247 (2002 census); 5,881 (1989 Soviet census).

== History ==
Olenino was founded on October 22 (October 9 Old Style) 1898 as a settlement serving the railway station. At the time, it belonged to Rzhevsky Uyezd of Tver Governorate.

On 12 July 1929, governorates and uyezds were abolished, and Oleninsky District with the administrative center in the settlement of Olenino was established. It belonged to Rzhev Okrug of Western Oblast. On August 1, 1930, the okrugs were abolished, and the districts were subordinated directly to the oblast. On 29 January 1935 Kalinin Oblast was established, and Oleninsky District was transferred to Kalinin Oblast. During World War II, from October 10, 1941 to March 4, 1943, Olenino was occupied by German troops. On 13 February 1963, Oleninsky District was abolished and merged into Nelidovsky District; on 4 March 1964, it was reestablished. In 1990, Kalinin Oblast was renamed Tver Oblast.

== Economy ==
=== Industry ===
There are enterprises of food and timber industries.

=== Transportation ===
The railway which connects Moscow and Riga via Rzhev, runs through Olenino. There is passenger railway traffic. Olenino is the biggest railway station in Oleninsky district.

The M9 highway connecting Moscow with Riga also passes Olenino. There are also local roads with bus traffic originating from Olenino.

== Culture and recreation ==
There is a local museum in Olenino.
