= Nelidovo, Nelidovsky District, Tver Oblast =

Town in Tver Oblast, Russia

Nelidovo Нелидово
- Town
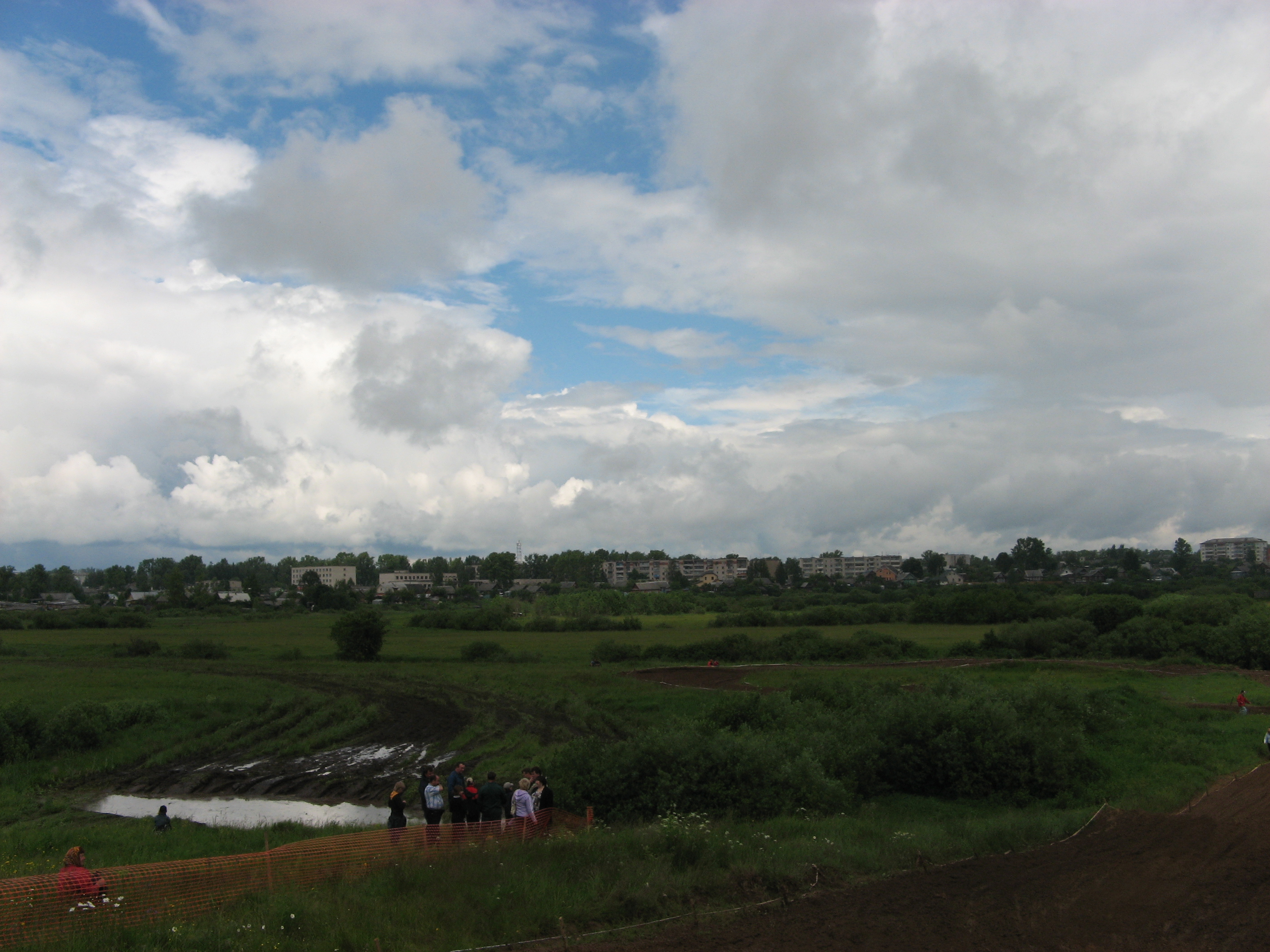
- View of Nelidovo

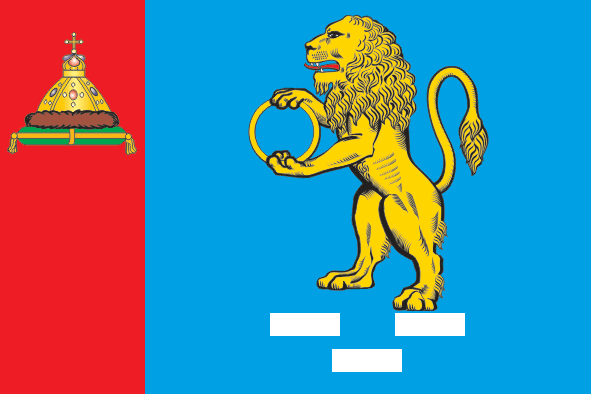
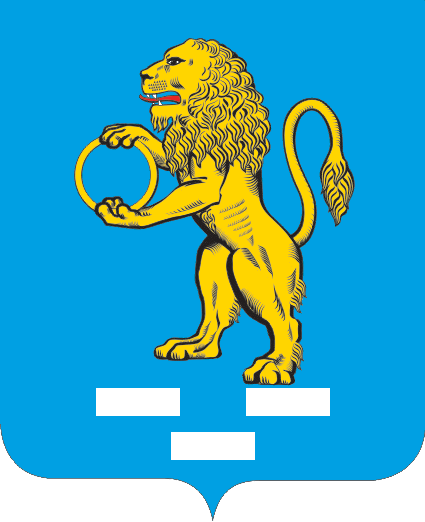
- Flag Coat of arms
- Interactive map of Nelidovo
- Location of Nelidovo Nelidovo (Tver Oblast)
- Coordinates: 56°13′N 32°48′E
- Country: Russia
- Federal subject: Tver Oblast
- Administrative district: Nelidovsky District
- Urban settlementSelsoviet: Nelidovo
- Founded: 1900
- Town status since: 1949
- Elevation: 200 m (660 ft)

Population (2010 Census)
  - Total: 22,896
  - Estimate (2021): 18,603 (−18.8%)

Administrative status
  - Capital of: Nelidovsky District, Nelidovo Urban Settlement

Municipal status
  - Municipal district: Nelidovsky Municipal District
  - Urban settlement: Nelidovo Urban Settlement
  - Capital of: Nelidovsky Municipal District, Nelidovo Urban Settlement
- Time zone: UTC+3 (MSK)
- Postal codes: 172520–172524, 172527
- OKTMO ID: 28643101001

Nelidovo (Russian: Нели́дово) is a town and the administrative center of Nelidovsky District in Tver Oblast, Russia, located in the Valdai Hills area on the Mezha River (Western Dvina's tributary), 276 kilometers (171 mi) southwest of Tver, the administrative center of the oblast. Population: 17,840 (2024 estimate); 22,896 (2010 census); 26,154 (2002 census); 30,044 (1989 Soviet census).

== History ==
Nelidovo was founded in 1898 near a railway station of the same name on the private Moscow-Vindava-Rybinsk Railway, 334 kilometers (208 mi) from Moscow's Rizhsky railway station. It belonged to Belsky Uyezd of Smolensk Governorate.

On 12 July 1929, governorates and uyezds were abolished, and Nelidovsky District with the administrative center in the settlement of Nelidovo was established. It belonged to Rzhev Okrug of Western Oblast. On August 1, 1930, the okrugs were abolished, and the districts were subordinated directly to the oblast. On 29 January 1935 Kalinin Oblast was established, and Nelidovsky District was transferred to Kalinin Oblast. During World War II, in 1941–1942, Nelidovo was occupied by German troops. On August 22, 1944, the district was transferred to newly established Velikiye Luki Oblast. Nelidovo was granted town status in 1949. On October 2, 1957, Velikiye Luki Oblast was abolished, and Nelidovsky District was transferred back to Kalinin Oblast. In 1990, Kalinin Oblast was renamed Tver Oblast.

== Administrative and municipal status ==
Within the framework of administrative divisions, Nelidovo serves as the administrative center of Nelidovsky District. As an administrative division, it is incorporated within Nelidovsky District as Nelidovo Urban Settlement. As a municipal division, this administrative unit also has urban settlement status and is a part of Nelidovsky Municipal District.

== Economy ==
=== Industry ===
Originally, Nelidovo was built to serve lignite deposits. The lignite mines are still active. Additionally, there are enterprises of timber, textile, and chemical industries in Nelidovo.

=== Transportation ===
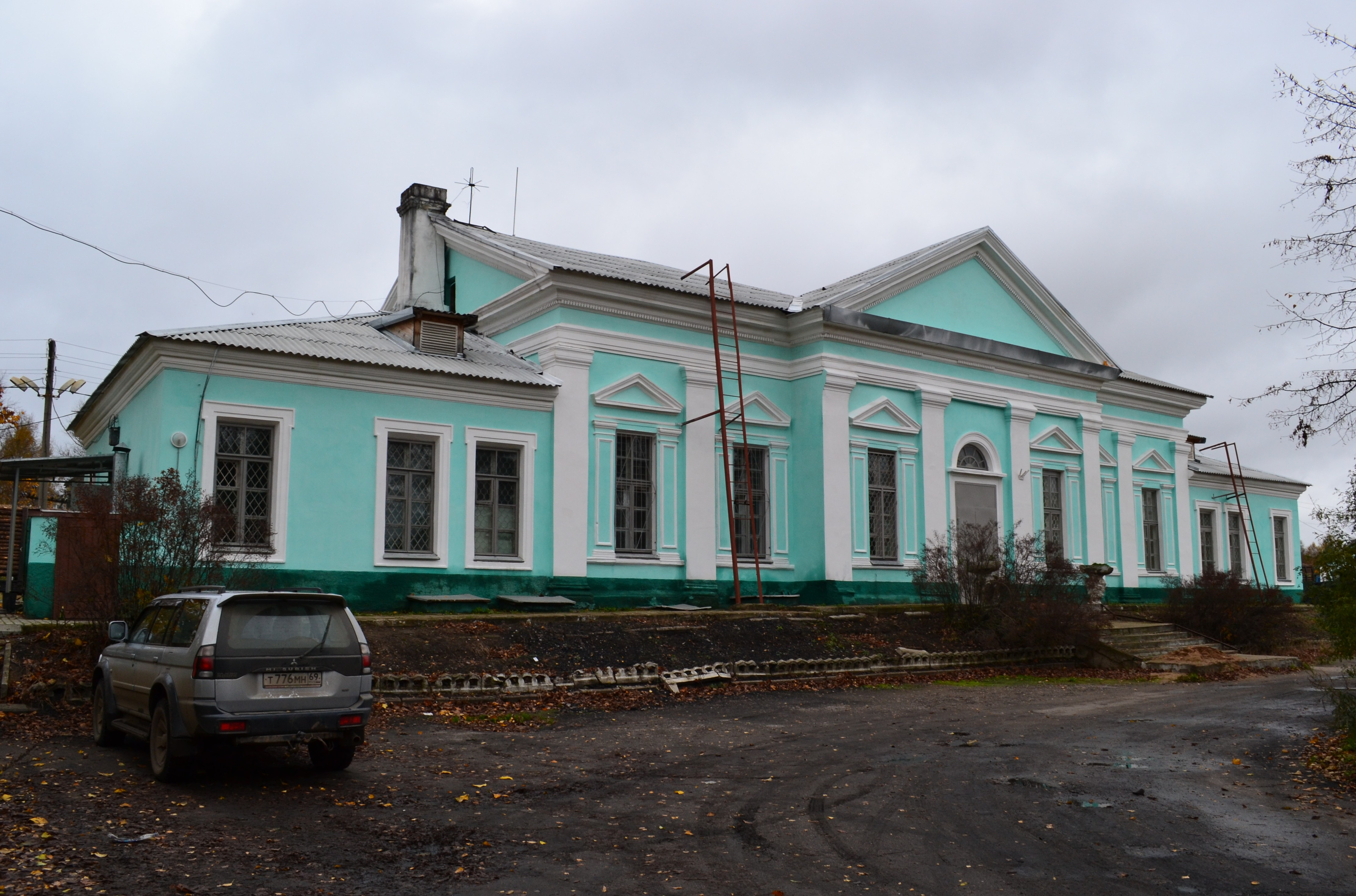
Nelidovo railway station

The railway which connects Moscow and Riga via Rzhev, crosses the district from east to west. There is passenger railway traffic.

The M9 highway connecting Moscow with Riga passes just north of Nelidovo. Another paved road connects Nelidovo with Dukhovshchina via Bely. There are also local roads with bus traffic originating from Nelidovo.

== Culture and recreation ==
Nelidovo has four cultural heritage monuments of local significance, which are graves of soldiers fallen in the World War II.

In 2009, the mining museum was opened in Nelidovo.
