= Zapadnodvinsky District =

Zapadnodvinsky District Западнодвинский район (Russian)
- District
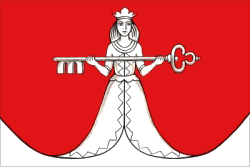
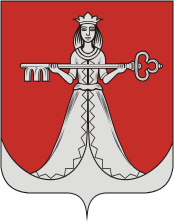
- Flag Coat of arms
- Location of Zapadnodvinsky District in Tver Oblast
- Coordinates: 56°16′N 32°05′E
- Country: Russia
- Federal subject: Tver Oblast
- Established: 1927
- Administrative center: Zapadnaya Dvina

Area
  - Total: 2,816 km^{2} (1,087 sq mi)

Population (2010 Census)
  - Total: 16,018
  - Density: 5.688/km^{2} (14.73/sq mi)
  - Urban: 71.0%
  - Rural: 29.0%

Administrative structure
  - Administrative divisions: 1 Urban settlements (towns), 1 Urban settlements (urban-type settlements), 5 Rural settlements
  - Inhabited localities: 1 cities/towns, 1 urban-type settlements, 267 rural localities

Municipal structure
  - Municipally incorporated as: Zapadnodvinsky Municipal District
  - Municipal divisions: 2 urban settlements, 5 rural settlements
- Time zone: UTC+3 (MSK)
- OKTMO ID: 28616000
- Website: http://www.zapdvina.ru/

Zapadnodvinsky District (Russian: Западнодви́нский райо́н) is an administrative and municipal district (raion), one of the thirty-six in Tver Oblast, Russia. It is located in the west of the oblast and borders with Toropetsky District in the north, Andreapolsky District in the northeast, Nelidovsky District in the east, Zharkovsky District in the southeast, Velizhsky District of Smolensk Oblast in the south, and with Kunyinsky District of Pskov Oblast in the west. The area of the district is 2,816 square kilometers (1,087 sq mi). Its administrative center is the town of Zapadnaya Dvina. Population: 16,018 (2010 Census); 19,707 (2002 Census); 24,585 (1989 Soviet census). The population of Zapadnaya Dvina accounts for 58.6% of the district's total population.

== Geography ==
The whole area in the district belongs to the drainage basin of the Daugava, known in Russia as the Western Dvina. The Westerd Dvina itself crosses the district from the northwest to the southeast, and a stretch of it makes the border to Pskov Oblast. The major tributaries of the Western Dvina within the district are the Velesa (left), the Toropa (right), and the Mezha (left). The Mezha makes the border to Zharkovsky District. 64% of the area of the district is forested.

== History ==
The Western Dvina was one of the most important Eastern European waterways, and the area of the district was populated since prehistory, as indicated by archaeological evidence. In the beginning of the 14th century, it was included into the Grand Duchy of Lithuania and remained there for around 150 years. In the 16th century, it went to the Grand Duchy of Moscow. In 1581, in the course of the Livonian War, it was transferred to Poland, and stayed here until 1678, when the northern part of the area was transferred to Russia. The southern part remained in Poland until the First Partition of Poland in 1772.

In the course of the administrative reform carried out in 1708 by Peter the Great, the north of the area (the right bank of the Western Dvina) was included into Ingermanland Governorate (known since 1710 as Saint Petersburg Governorate). In 1727, separate Novgorod Governorate was split off, and in 1772, Pskov Governorate (which between 1777 and 1796 existed as Pskov Viceroyalty) was established. The northern part of the contemporary Zapadnodvinsky District was included into Toropetsky Uyezd of Pskov Governorate. Zapadnaya Dvina was founded in 1900 as a station on the railway connecting Moscow and Riga.

The left bank of the Western Dvina in 1708 was included into Belsky Uyezd of Smolensk Governorate and remained there until 1929, with the exception of the brief periods between 1713 and 1726, when it belonged to Riga Governorate, and between 1775 and 1796, when Smolensk Governorate was transformed into Smolensk Viceroyalty.

The southern part of the area in 1772 was included into newly established Pskov Governorate. In 1777, it was transferred to Polotsk Viceroyalty. In 1796, the viceroyalty was abolished and the area was transferred to Belarus Governorate; since 1802 to Vitebsk Governorate. It belonged to Velizhsky Uyezd. After 1919, Vitebsk Governorate was a part of Russian Soviet Federative Socialist Republic. In 1924, Vitebsk Governorate was abolished, and Velizhsky Uyezd was transferred to Pskov Governorate.

On August 1, 1927, the uyezds were abolished, and Oktyabrsky District was established, with the administrative center in the selo of Staraya Toropa. Pskov Governorate was abolished as well, and the district became a part of Velikiye Luki Okrug of Leningrad Oblast. The district center was subsequently moved to the settlement of Zapadnaya Dvina. On June 17, 1929, the district was transferred to Western Oblast. On July 23, 1930, the okrugs were also abolished and the districts were directly subordinated to the oblast. On January 29, 1935 Kalinin Oblast was established, and Oktyabrsky District was transferred to Kalinin Oblast. In 1937, Zapadnaya Dvina was granted town status. Between September 1941 and January 1942, Oktyabrsky District was occupied by German troops. On August 22, 1944, the district was transferred to newly established Velikiye Luki Oblast. On October 2, 1957, Velikiye Luki Oblast was abolished, and Oktyabrsky District was transferred to Kalinin Oblast. On February 13, 1963 it was merged with a part of Nelidovsky District to form Zapadnodvinsky District, with the administrative center in Zapadnaya Dvina. In 1990, Kalinin Oblast was renamed Tver Oblast.

On August 1, 1927 Ilyinsky District with the administrative center located in the selo of Ilyino was established as well. The district was a part of Velikiye Luki Okrug of Leningrad Oblast, and on June 17, 1929 with the rest of the okrug it was transferred to Western Oblast. On January 29, 1935 the district was transferred to Kalinin Oblast, on August 22, 1944 to Velikiye Luki Oblast, and on October 2, 1957 back to Kalinin Oblast. On January 12, 1960 Ilyinsky District was abolished and merged into Oktyabrsky District.

== Economy ==
=== Industry ===
90% of the economy of the district is related to timber production.

=== Agriculture ===
The main agricultural specialization of the district is cattle breeding with meat and milk production.

=== Transportation ===
The railway which connects Moscow and Riga via Rzhev, crosses the district from east to west. There is passenger railway traffic. Zapadnaya Dvina is the biggest railway station in the district.

The M9 highway connecting Moscow with Riga also crosses the district, passing just north of Zapadnaya Dvina. Paved roads to Zharkovsky, Ostashkov via Andreapol, and Toropets branch off. There are also local roads with bus traffic originating from Zapadnaya Dvina.

== Culture and recreation ==
The district contains nine cultural heritage monuments of federal significance and additionally fifty-four objects classified as cultural and historical heritage of local significance. The federal monuments are the Saint Saviour Church in the selo of Kochevitsy, the Transfiguration Church in the village of Pesno, the Trinity Church in the selo of Pyatiusovo, the Church of Saint Sergius of Radonezh in the selo of Sopot, as well as two archaeological sites.

In the urban-type settlement of Staraya Toropa, there is a local museum.
