= Nelidovsky District =

Nelidovsky District Нелидовский район (Russian)
- District
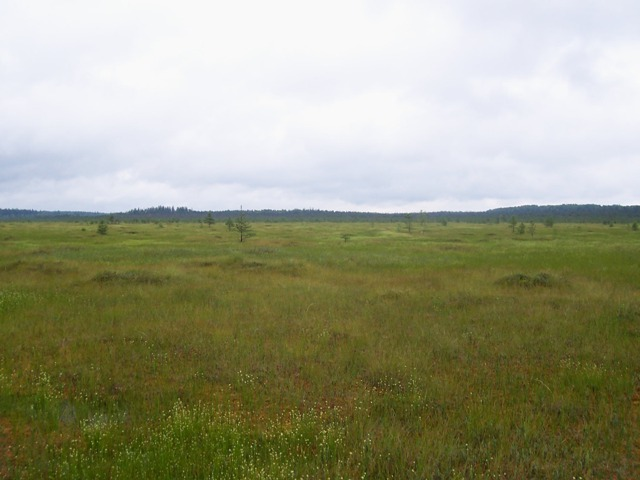
- Staroselsky Mokh swamp, Central Forest Nature Reserve

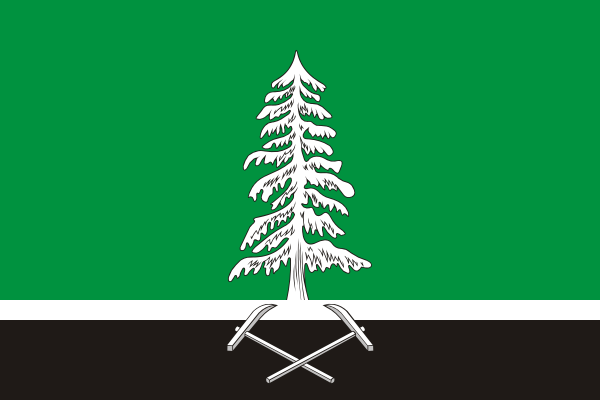
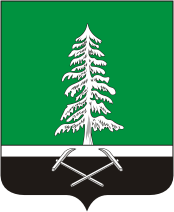
- Flag Coat of arms
- Location of Nelidovsky District in Tver Oblast
- Coordinates: 56°13′N 32°47′E
- Country: Russia
- Federal subject: Tver Oblast
- Established: 1929
- Administrative center: Nelidovo

Area
  - Total: 2,632 km^{2} (1,016 sq mi)

Population (2010 Census)
  - Total: 30,731
  - Density: 11.68/km^{2} (30.24/sq mi)
  - Urban: 74.5%
  - Rural: 25.5%

Administrative structure
  - Administrative divisions: 1 Urban settlements, 5 Rural settlements
  - Inhabited localities: 1 cities/towns, 169 rural localities

Municipal structure
  - Municipally incorporated as: Nelidovsky Municipal District
  - Municipal divisions: 1 urban settlements, 5 rural settlements
- Time zone: UTC+3 (MSK)
- OKTMO ID: 28643000
- Website: http://www.nelidovo.su/

Nelidovsky District (Russian: Нели́довский райо́н) is an administrative and municipal district (raion), one of the thirty-six in Tver Oblast, Russia. It is located in the southwest of the oblast and borders with Andreapolsky District in the north, Selizharovsky District in the northeast, Oleninsky District in the east, Belsky District in the south, Zharkovsky District in the southwest, and with Zapadnodvinsky District in the west. The area of the district is 2,632 square kilometers (1,016 sq mi). Its administrative center is the town of Nelidovo. Population: 30,731 (2010 Census); 9,144 (2002 census); 11,829 (1989 Soviet census). The population of Nelidovo accounts for 74.5% of the district's total population.

== Geography ==
Almost the whole area of the district belongs to the drainage basin of the Western Dvina. Its major left tributary, the Mezha, has its source in the district and crosses the district from north to south. Other tributaries of the Wester Dvina which flow through the district include the Belesa and the Turosna. The northern part of the district belongs to the drainage basins of the Zhukopa and the Tudovka, right tributaries of the Volga. Thus, the district is crossed by the divide between the basins of the Atlantic and of the Caspian Sea.

The northern part of the district belongs to the Central Forest Nature Reserve, a protected area created to preserve conifer forest with the corresponding plants and animals, including the Eurasian brown bear, in the upper course of the Western Dvina.

Forest and bush occupy 75.6% of the area of the district.

== History ==
The area belonged to Principality of Smolensk since the 12th century. Later, Principality of Toropets split off, and the area was a part of it. In the 14th century, it was included into the Grand Duchy of Lithuania. In the 16th century, it went to the Grand Duchy of Moscow.

In the course of the administrative reform carried out in 1708 by Peter the Great, the area was included into Belsky Uyezd of Smolensk Governorate and remained there until 1929, with the exception of the brief periods between 1713 and 1726, when it belonged to Riga Governorate, and between 1775 and 1796, when Smolensk Governorate was transformed into Smolensk Viceroyalty.

On 12 July 1929, governorates and uyezds were abolished, and Nelidovsky District with the administrative center in the settlement of Nelidovo was established. It belonged to Rzhev Okrug of Western Oblast. On August 1, 1930 the okrugs were abolished, and the districts were subordinated directly to the oblast. On 29 January 1935 Kalinin Oblast was established, and Nelidovsky District was transferred to Kalinin Oblast. During World War II, in 1941—1943, the district was occupied by German troops. On 22 August 1944, the district was transferred to newly established Velikiye Luki Oblast. On October 2, 1957, Velikiye Luki Oblast was abolished, and Nelidovsky District was transferred back to Kalinin Oblast. On February 1, 1963, during the abortive Khrushchyov administrative reform, Oleninsky and Belsky Districts were merged into Nelidovsky District, and a part of Nelidovsky District was transferred to Zapadnodvinsky District. In 1964-65 Oleninsky and Belsky Districts were re-established. In 1990, Kalinin Oblast was renamed Tver Oblast.

== Economy ==
=== Industry ===
Originally, Nelidovo was built to serve lignite deposits. The lignite mines are still active. Additionally, there are enterprises of timber, textile, and chemical industries in the district.

=== Agriculture ===
The main agricultural specialization of the district is cattle breeding with meat and milk production.

=== Transportation ===
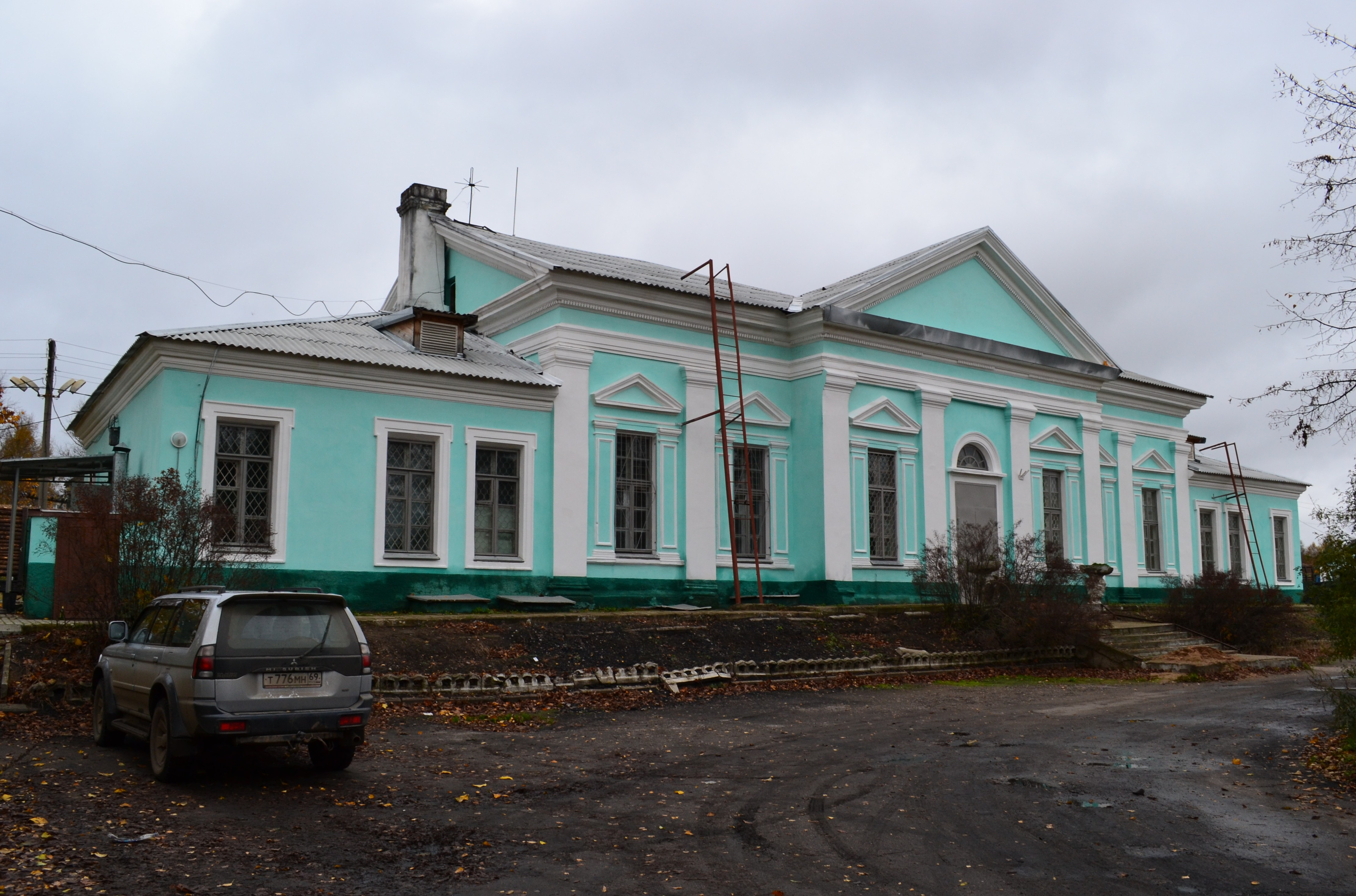
Nelidovo railway station

The railway which connects Moscow and Riga via Rzhev, crosses the district from east to west. There is passenger railway traffic. Nelidovo is the biggest railway station in the district. A side railroad connects the station of Zemtsy with Zharkovsky railway station. There is infrequent passenger traffic, two times per week as of 2015. The branch is not electrified.

The M9 highway connecting Moscow with Riga also crosses the district, passing just north of Nelidovo. Another paved road connects Nelidovo with Dukhovshchina via Bely. There are also local roads with bus traffic originating from Nelidovo.

== Culture and recreation ==
The district contains fifty-five cultural heritage monuments of local significance (four of them in Nelidovo). The vast majority of these monuments are graves of soldiers fallen in the World War II, there are also several 18th-century churches.

In 2009, the mining museum was opened in Nelidovo.
