= Belsky District, Tver Oblast =

Belsky District Бельский район (Russian)
- District
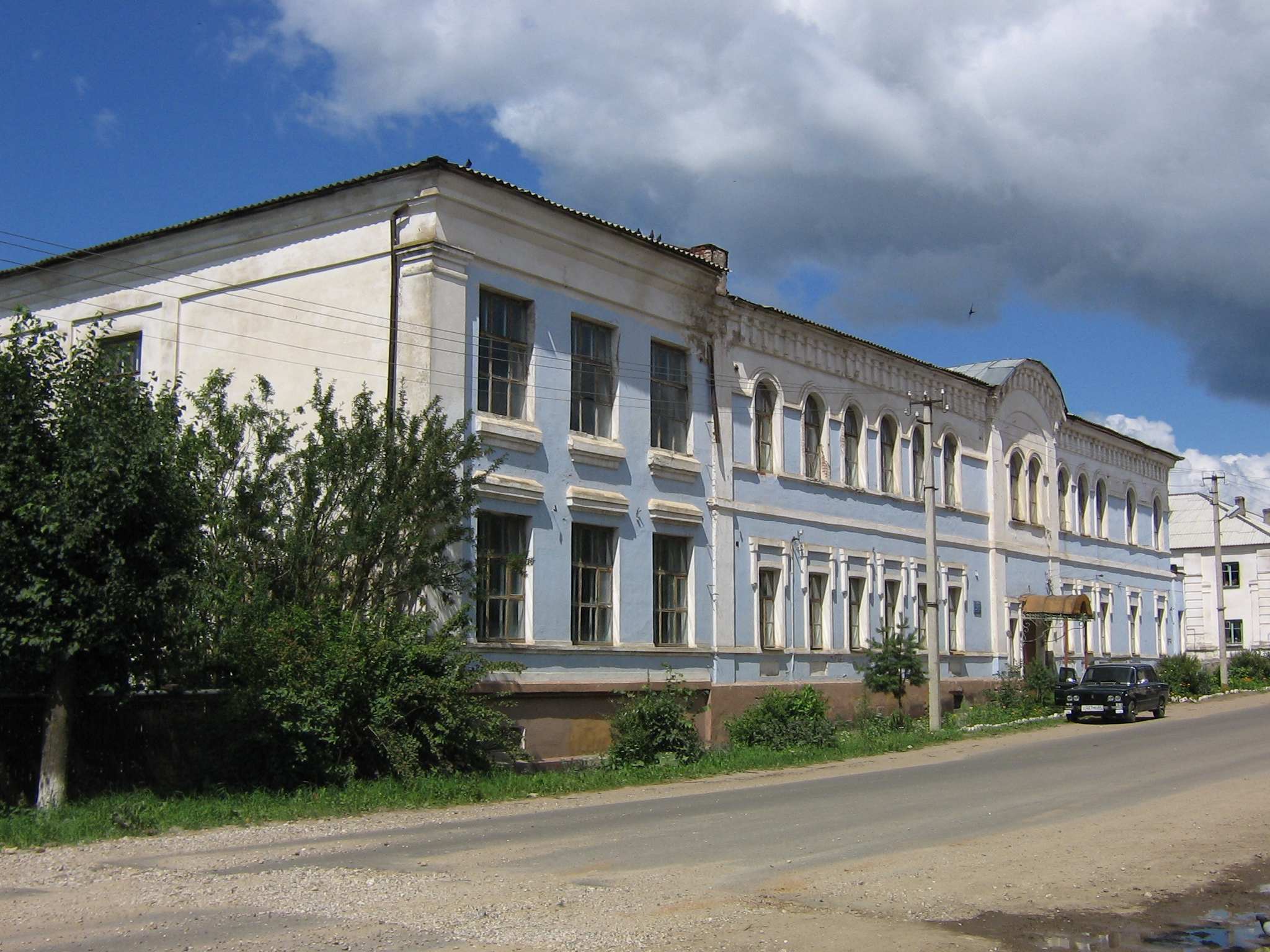
- Women's College, Bely

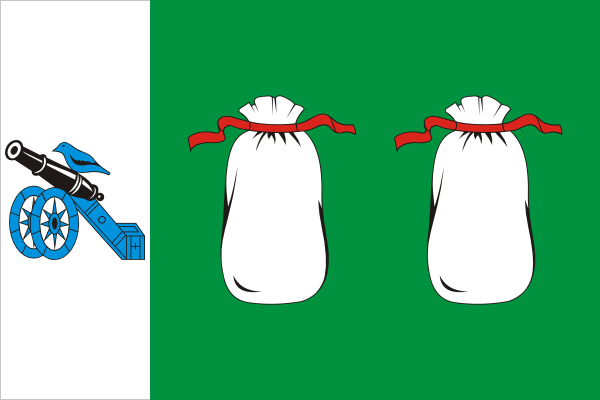
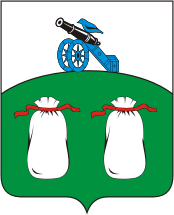
- Flag Coat of arms
- Location of Belsky District in Tver Oblast
- Coordinates: 55°50′N 32°56′E
- Country: Russia
- Federal subject: Tver Oblast
- Established: 1 October 1929
- Administrative center: Bely

Area
  - Total: 2,135 km^{2} (824 sq mi)

Population (2010 Census)
  - Total: 6,582
  - Density: 3.083/km^{2} (7.985/sq mi)
  - Urban: 57.3%
  - Rural: 42.7%

Administrative structure
  - Administrative divisions: 6 rural settlement
  - Inhabited localities: 1 cities/towns, 140 rural localities

Municipal structure
  - Municipally incorporated as: Belsky Municipal District
  - Municipal divisions: 1 urban settlements, 6 rural settlements
- Time zone: UTC+3 (MSK)
- OKTMO ID: 28606000
- Website: http://www.belej.ru/

Belsky District (Russian: Бе́льский райо́н) is an administrative and municipal district (raion), one of the thirty-six in Tver Oblast, Russia. It is located in the southwest of the oblast and borders with Nelidovsky District in the north, Oleninsky District in the northeast, Sychyovsky District of Smolensk Oblast in the east, Novoduginsky District of Smolensk Oblast in the southeast, Kholm-Zhirkovsky District of Smolensk Oblast in the south, Dukhovshchinsky District of Smolensk Oblast in the southwest, and with Zharkovsky District in the west. The area of the district is 2,135 square kilometers (824 sq mi). Its administrative center is the town of Bely. Population: 6,582 (2010 Census); 8,125 (2002 census); 10,005 (1989 Soviet census). The population of Bely accounts for 57.3% of the district's total population.

== Geography ==
The area of the district is divided between the drainage basins of the Western Dvina and the Dnieper Rivers. The rivers in the northern and the central part of the district drain into the Mezha, a left tributary of the Western Dvina. The biggest tributary of the Mezha within the district is the Obsha. Small areas in the south of the district belong to the drainage basin of the Vop, a right tributary of the Dnieper. Over 65% of the area of the district is occupied by forest.

== History ==
The fortress of Bely is first mentioned in a chronicle in 1350, since it was conquered by the Grand Duchy of Lithuania. It was located on the border between Lithuanian and Russian lands, and intermittently changed affiliation between Lithuania (later Poland) and the Grand Duchy of Moscow, until in 1654 it finally went to Moscow.

In the course of the administrative reform carried out in 1708 by Peter the Great, the area was included into Belsky Uyezd of Smolensk Governorate and remained there until 1929, with the exception of the brief periods between 1713 and 1726, when it belonged to Riga Governorate, and between 1775 and 1796, when Smolensk Governorate was transformed into Smolensk Viceroyalty.

On 12 July 1929, governorates and uyezds were abolished, and Belsky District with the administrative center in the town of Bely was established. It belonged to Rzhev Okrug of Western Oblast. On August 1, 1930 the okrugs were abolished, and the districts were subordinated directly to the oblast. On 27 September 1937 Western Oblast was abolished and split between Smolensk and Oryol Oblasts. Belsky District was transferred to Smolensk Oblast. During World War II, in 1941—1943, the district was occupied by German troops. On August 22, 1944, the district was transferred to newly established Velikiye Luki Oblast. On October 2, 1957, Velikiye Luki Oblast was abolished, and Belsky District was transferred to Kalinin Oblast. On February 13, 1963 the district was abolished and merged into Nelidovsky District; on November 3, 1965 it was re-established. In 1990, Kalinin Oblast was renamed Tver Oblast.

== Economy ==
=== Industry ===
There are enterprises of timber and food industries, located in Bely.

=== Agriculture ===
The main agricultural specialization of the district is cattle breeding with meat and milk production.

=== Transportation ===
A paved road connecting Nelidovo and Smolensk via Dukhovshchina crosses the district from north to south, passing Bely. There are local roads. There are no railways in the district; the closest railway stations are in Nelidovo (on the railway connecting Moscow and Riga via Velikiye Luki) and Vladimirsky Tupik (the terminus of a railway which branches off in Safonovo from the line connecting Moscow and Smolensk.

== Culture and recreation ==
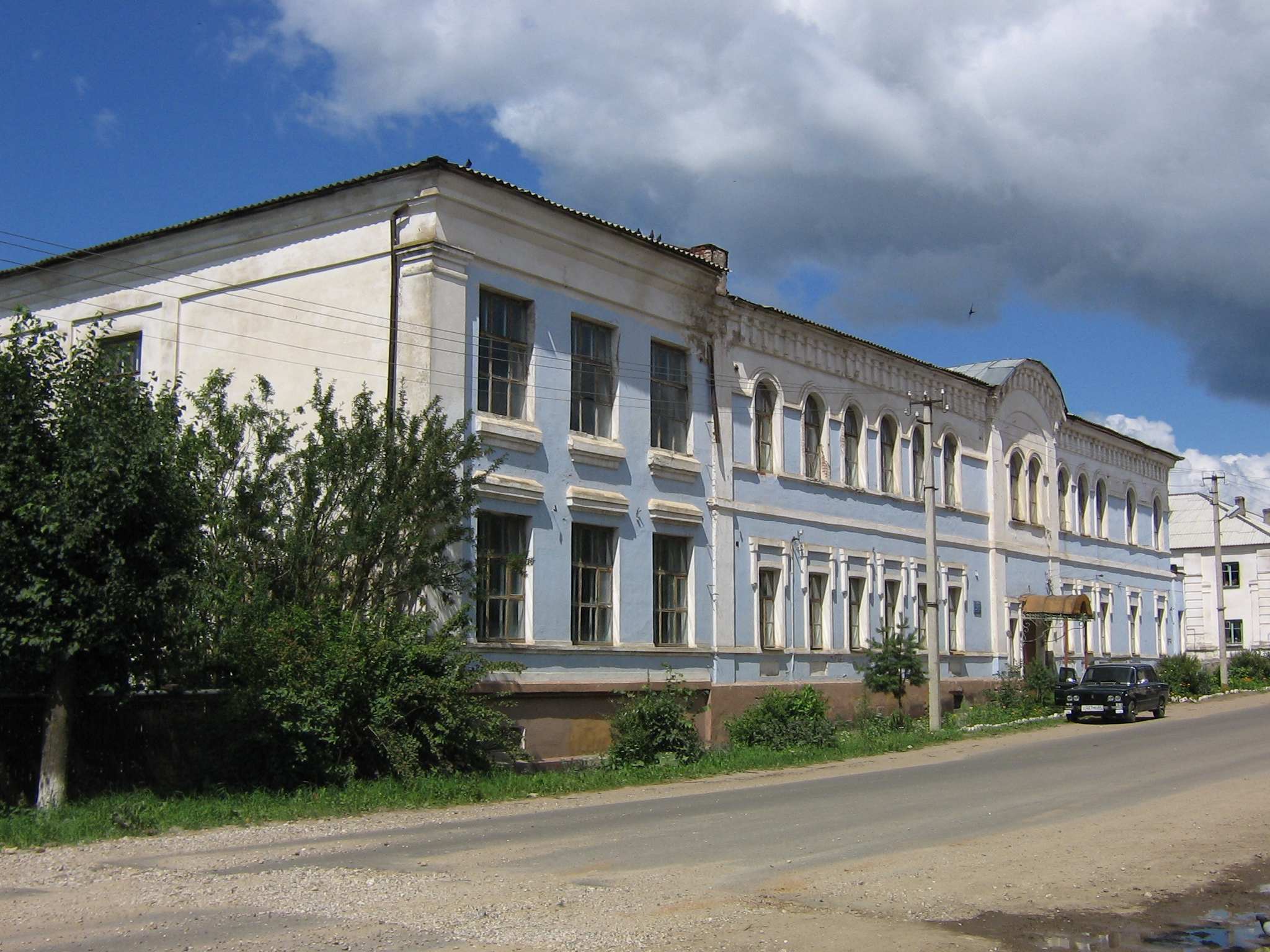
The building of the former high school for girls, Bely

The district contains eleven cultural heritage monuments of federal significance (five of them in Bely) and additionally ninety-two objects (sixty-five of them in Bely) classified as cultural and historical heritage of local significance. The federally protected monuments are the Saint Mitrophan Church in the village of Dunayevo, the Saint Nicholas Church in the village of Chichaty, as well as archeological sites related to the old town of Bely and several monuments to the soldiers fallen in the World War II.

There is a local museum in Bely, founded in 1925.
