= Zharkovsky =

Zharkovsky (masculine), Zharkovskaya (feminine), or Zharkovskoye (neuter) may refer to:

- Zharkovsky District, a district of Tver Oblast, Russia
- Zharkovsky (urban-type settlement), an urban locality (an urban-type settlement) in Tver Oblast, Russia
