= Zapadnaya Dvina =

Town in Tver Oblast, Russia

Zapadnaya Dvina Западная Двина
- Town
- Interactive map of Zapadnaya Dvina
- Location of Zapadnaya Dvina Zapadnaya Dvina (Tver Oblast)
- Coordinates: 56°16′N 32°04′E
- Country: Russia
- Federal subject: Tver Oblast
- Administrative district: Zapadnodvinsky District
- Urban settlementSelsoviet: Zapadnaya Dvina
- Founded: 1900
- Town status since: 1937
- Elevation: 185 m (607 ft)

Population (2010 Census)
  - Total: 9,378
  - Estimate (2021): 7,869 (−16.1%)

Administrative status
  - Capital of: Zapadnodvinsky District, Zapadnaya Dvina Urban Settlement

Municipal status
  - Municipal district: Zapadnodvinsky Municipal District
  - Urban settlement: Zapadnaya Dvina Urban Settlement
  - Capital of: Zapadnodvinsky Municipal District, Zapadnaya Dvina Urban Settlement
- Time zone: UTC+3 (MSK)
- Postal codes: 172610, 172611, 172649
- OKTMO ID: 28616101001

Zapadnaya Dvina (Russian: За́падная Двина́) is a town and the administrative center of Zapadnodvinsky District in Tver Oblast, Russia, located on the right bank of the Daugava River, 321 kilometers (199 mi) southwest of Tver, the administrative center of the oblast. Population: 9,378 (2010 census); 10,212 (2002 census); 11,556 (1989 Soviet census).

== History ==
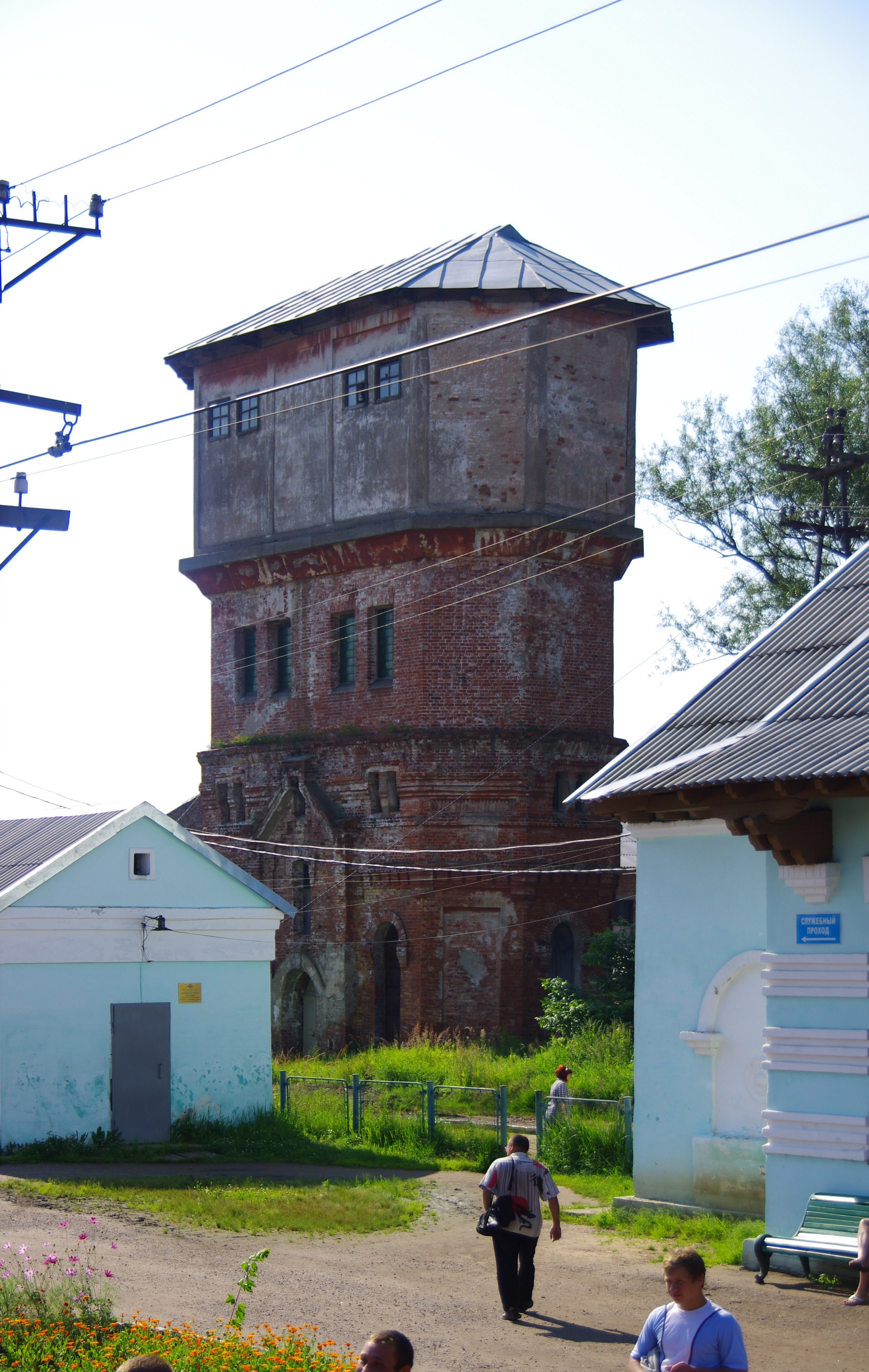
A water tower

Zapadnaya Dvina was founded in 1900 as a station on the railway connecting Moscow and Riga. In 1927, it was granted urban-type settlement status. It belonged to Toropetsky Uyezd of Pskov Governorate.

On August 1, 1927, the uyezds were abolished, and Oktyabrsky District was established, with the administrative center in the selo of Staraya Toropa. Pskov Governorate was abolished as well, and the district became a part of Velikiye Luki Okrug of Leningrad Oblast. The district center was subsequently moved to the settlement of Zapadnaya Dvina. On June 17, 1929, the district was transferred to Western Oblast. On July 23, 1930, the okrugs were also abolished and the districts were directly subordinated to the oblast. On January 29, 1935 Kalinin Oblast was established, and Oktyabrsky District was transferred to Kalinin Oblast. In 1937, Zapadnaya Dvina was granted town status. Between October 6, 1941 and January 21, 1942, Zapadnaya Dvina was occupied by German troops. On August 22, 1944, the district was transferred to newly established Velikiye Luki Oblast. On October 2, 1957, Velikiye Luki Oblast was abolished, and Oktyabrsky District was transferred back to Kalinin Oblast. On February 13, 1963, it was merged with a part of Nelidovsky District to form Zapadnodvinsky District, with the administrative center in Zapadnaya Dvina. In 1990, Kalinin Oblast was renamed Tver Oblast.

== Administrative and municipal status ==
Within the framework of administrative divisions, Zapadnaya Dvina serves as the administrative center of Zapadnodvinsky District. As an administrative division, it is incorporated within Zapadnodvinsky District as Zapadnaya Dvina Urban Settlement. As a municipal division, this administrative unit also has urban settlement status and is a part of Zapadnodvinsky Municipal District.

== Economy ==
=== Industry ===
The economy of Zapadnaya Dvina and the district is based on timber production.

=== Transportation ===
The railway which connects Moscow and Riga via Rzhev passes through Zapadnaya Dvina. There is passenger railway traffic. The M9 highway connecting Moscow with Riga passes just north of Zapadnaya Dvina. A paved road to Ostashkov via Andreapol branches off. There are also local roads with bus traffic originating from Zapadnaya Dvina.
