= Mezha =

Mezha is the name of two rivers in Russia:

- Mezha (Daugava) is a river in Tver Oblast, tributary of the Daugava (Western Dvina).
- Mezha (Unzha) is a river in the Kostroma Oblast, tributary of the Unzha.

Mezha means border in Ukrainian.
