= Tudovka =

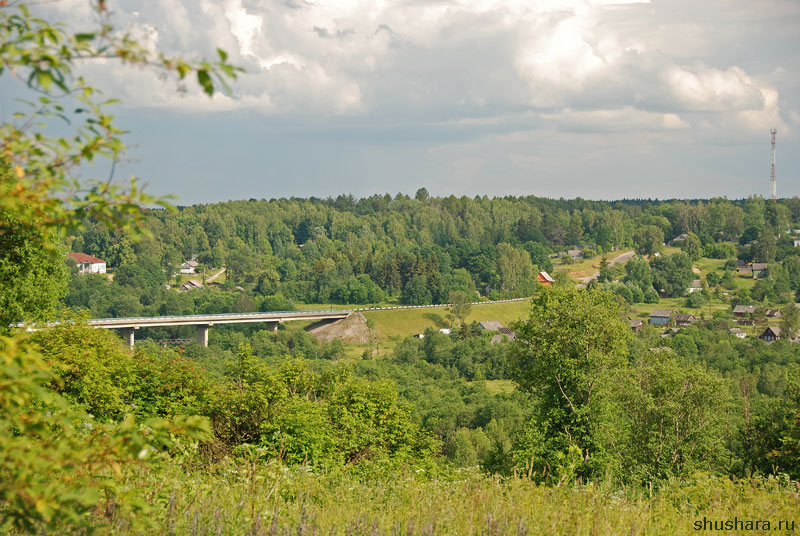
- Bridge over the Tudovka in Molodoy Tud

Location
- Country: Russia

Physical characteristics
- Mouth: Volga
  - coordinates: 56°24′56″N 33°49′28″E
- Length: 103 km (64 mi)
- Basin size: 1,140 km^{2} (440 sq mi)

Basin features
- Progression: Volga→ Caspian Sea

The Tudovka (Russian: Ту́довка) is a river in Oleninsky, Nelidovsky, Selizharovsky, and Rzhevsky districts of Tver Oblast of Russia, a right tributary of the Volga. The Tudovka is 103 kilometres (64 mi) long, and the area of its drainage basin is 1,140 square kilometres (440 mi^{2}).

The source of the Tudovka is in the swamps in the westernmost part of Oleninsky District. The river flows north and crosses into Nelidovsky District. The village of Tud is the uppermost locality on the Tudovka. A short stretch of the Tudovka makes the border between Nelidovsky and Selizharovsky districts, and downstream the river departs from the border, turns northeast and crosses into Selizharovsky District. In the village of Bolshoye Kashino it makes a sharp turn to the south and crosses into Oleninsky District. Downstream of the village of Barygino the Tudovka turns east. The biggest locality at the banks of the Tudovka is the selo of Molodoy Tud which in the middle of the 20th century was the center of Molodotudsky District, later abolished. Downstream of the village of Kazakovo the Tudovka crosses into Rzhevsky District. Its mouth is opposite to the village of Sukontsevo.

The drainage basin of the Tudovka includes the northern part of Oleninsky District, as well as minor areas in Rzhevsky, Selizharovsky, and Nelidovsky Districts.

The stretch of the Tudovka within Nelidovsky District is located in Central Forest Nature Reserve.

The Eurasian beaver was reintroduced in the Tudovka, and there is currently stable population of the beaver.
