= Zharkovsky District =

Zharkovsky District Жарковский район (Russian)
- District
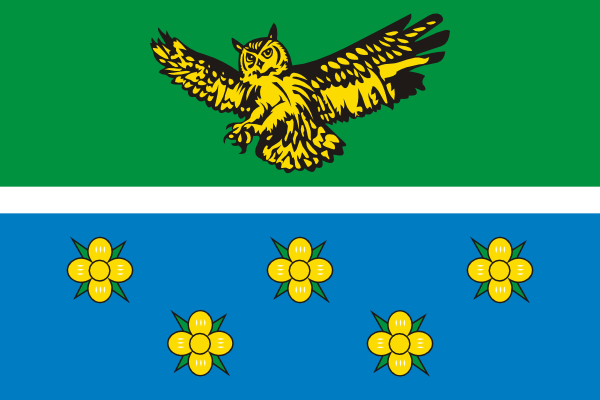
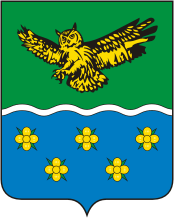
- Flag Coat of arms
- Location of Zharkovsky District in Tver Oblast
- Coordinates: 55°50′38″N 32°15′46″E
- Country: Russia
- Federal subject: Tver Oblast
- Established: 1973
- Administrative center: Zharkovsky

Area
  - Total: 1,625 km^{2} (627 sq mi)

Population (2010 Census)
  - Total: 6,132
  - Density: 3.774/km^{2} (9.773/sq mi)
  - Urban: 65.5%
  - Rural: 34.5%

Administrative structure
  - Administrative divisions: 1 Urban settlements, 3 Rural settlements
  - Inhabited localities: 1 urban-type settlements, 104 rural localities

Municipal structure
  - Municipally incorporated as: Zharkovsky Municipal District
  - Municipal divisions: 1 urban settlements, 3 rural settlements
- Time zone: UTC+3 (MSK)
- OKTMO ID: 28614000
- Website: http://www.zharkiadm.ru/

Zharkovsky District (Russian: Жарко́вский райо́н) is an administrative and municipal district (raion), one of the thirty-six in Tver Oblast, Russia. It is located in the southwest of the oblast and borders with Nelidovsky District in the north, Belsky District in the east, Dukhovshchinsky District of Smolensk Oblast in the southeast, Demidovsky District of Smolensk Oblast in the south, Velizhsky District of Smolensk Oblast in the southwest, and with Zapadnodvinsky District in the west. The area of the district is 1,625 square kilometers (627 sq mi). Its administrative center is the urban locality (an urban-type settlement) of Zharkovsky. Population: 6,132 (2010 Census); 7,631 (2002 Census); 10,763 (1989 Soviet census). The population of the administrative center accounts for 65.5% of the district's total population.

== Geography ==
The whole area of the district belongs to the drainage basin of the Daugava, known in Russia as the Western Dvina. The main tributary of the Western Dvina in the district is the Mezha, which crosses the district from east to west. In particular, the urban-type settlement of Zharkovsky is located on the banks of the Mezha. The main tributaries of the Mezha in the district are the Obsha, the Shesnitsa, and the Yelsha. Lake Shchuchye, the biggest lake in the district, belongs to the drainage basin of the Yelsha as well. The northern part of the district belongs to the drainage basin of the Velesa, another left tributary of the Western Dvina, and its tributary, the Turosna. 69% of the district area is forested.

== History ==
In the Middle Ages, the area was located on the border between Lithuanian and Russian lands, and intermittently changed affiliation between the Grand Duchy of Lithuania (later Poland) and a number of Russian principalities, including the Grand Duchy of Moscow, until in the 17th century it finally went to Moscow.

In the course of the administrative reform carried out in 1708 by Peter the Great, the area was included into Smolensk Governorate and remained there until 1929, with the exception of the brief periods between 1713 and 1726, when it belonged to Riga Governorate, and between 1775 and 1796, when Smolensk Governorate was transformed into Smolensk Viceroyalty. It was split between Belsky Uyezd and Porechsky Uyezd.

On 12 July 1929, governorates and uyezds were abolished, and the area was included into Western Oblast and split between Belsky, Oktyabrsky, Ilyinsky, and Prechistensky Districts. Belsky District belonged to Rzhev Okrug, Ilyinsky and Oktyabrsky Districts belonged to Velikiye Luki Okrug, whereas and Prechistensky District belonged to Smolensk Okrug. On August 1, 1930 the okrugs were abolished, and the districts were subordinated directly to the oblast. In 1934, Prechistensky District was abolished, and part of its area was transferred to Ilyinsky District. On 29 January 1935 Kalinin Oblast was established, and Oktyabrsky District was transferred to Kalinin Oblast. On September 27, 1937 Western Oblast was abolished and split between Smolensk and Oryol Oblasts. Belsky and Ilyinsky Districts were transferred to Smolensk Oblast. During World War II, in 1941—1943, the current area of the district was occupied by German troops. On August 22, 1944, Belsky, Ilyinsky, and Oktyabrsky Districts were transferred to newly established Velikiye Luki Oblast. On 10 March 1945, Zharkovsky District with the center in the railway station of Zharki was established from the areas which previously belonged to Belsky, Ilyinsky, and Oktyabrsky Districts. In 1950, a number of villages were merged into the urban-type settlement of Zharkovsky, which became the administrative center of the district. On October 2, 1957, Velikiye Luki Oblast was abolished, and Zharkovsky District was transferred to Kalinin Oblast. On January 12, 1960 the district was abolished and split between Belsky, Nelidovsky, and Oktyabrsky Districts; on December 27, 1973 it was re-established. In 1990, Kalinin Oblast was renamed Tver Oblast.

== Economy ==
=== Industry ===
The economy of the district is based on the timber industry. There are also enterprises producing food and fertilizers.

=== Agriculture ===
The main agricultural specializations of the district are cattle breeding with meat and milk production, as well as potato and vegetable growing.

=== Transportation ===
A railroad connects Zharkovsky railway station with the station of Zemtsy on the railway between Moscow and Riga. There is infrequent passenger traffic, two times per week as of 2015. The branch is not electrified.

A paved road connects Zharkovsky with Zapadnaya Dvina.

== Culture and recreation ==
The district contains sixteen objects (one of them in Zharkovsky) classified as cultural and historical heritage of local significance. All of them are monuments to the soldiers fallen in the World War II.

In 2012, in the village of Shchuchye, the Northern Pike Museum was open. The village is located on the bank of Lake Shchuchye, and the name of both the village and the lake refers to the northern pike.
