= Oleninsky District =

Oleninsky District Оленинский район (Russian)
- District
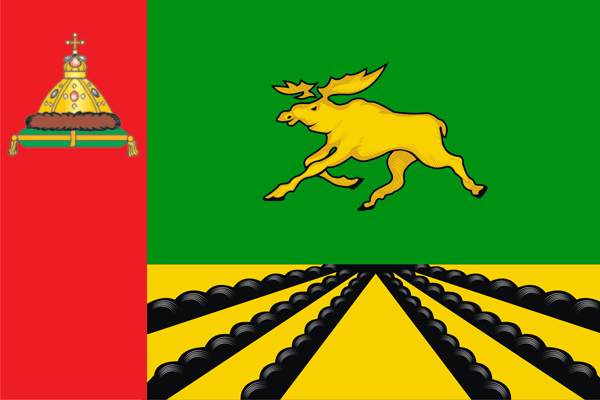
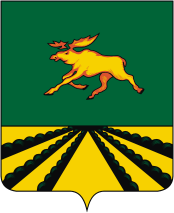
- Flag Coat of arms
- Location of Oleninsky District in Tver Oblast
- Coordinates: 56°12′15″N 33°28′39″E
- Country: Russia
- Federal subject: Tver Oblast
- Established: 1929
- Administrative center: Olenino

Area
  - Total: 2,675 km^{2} (1,033 sq mi)

Population (2010 Census)
  - Total: 12,675
  - Density: 4.738/km^{2} (12.27/sq mi)
  - Urban: 38.8%
  - Rural: 61.2%

Administrative structure
  - Administrative divisions: 1 Urban settlements, 6 Rural settlements
  - Inhabited localities: 1 urban-type settlements, 338 rural localities

Municipal structure
  - Municipally incorporated as: Oleninsky Municipal District
  - Municipal divisions: 1 urban settlements, 6 rural settlements
- Time zone: UTC+3 (MSK)
- OKTMO ID: 28644000
- Website: http://www.olenino.ru/

Oleninsky District (Russian: Оле́нинский райо́н) is an administrative and municipal district (raion), one of the thirty-six in Tver Oblast, Russia. It is located in the southwest of the oblast and borders with Selizharovsky District in the north, Rzhevsky District in the east, Sychyovsky District of Smolensk Oblast in the southeast, Belsky District in the south, and with Nelidovsky District in the west. The area of the district is 2,675 square kilometers (1,033 sq mi). Its administrative center is the urban locality (an urban-type settlement) of Olenino. Population: 12,675 (2010 Census); 14,817 (2002 census); 18,892 (1989 Soviet census). The population of Olenino accounts for 38.8% of the district's total population.

== Geography ==
The area of the district split between the drainage basins of the Daugava River (the Atlantic) and the Volga River (the Caspian Sea). The rivers in the northern and in the western parts of the district flow into the Tudovka River, a right tributary of the Volga, and into the Osuga River, a left tributary of the Vazuza River. Both the Osuga and the Tudovka have their sources in the district. The central and the southern parts of the district drain into the Luchega River, the Beryoza River, and the Obsha River, the tributaries of the Mezha River, a tributary of the Daugava. The Luchega and the Beryoza have their source in the district, and the Obsha crosses the south of the district. About 60% of the area of Oleninsky District is forested.

== History ==
In the 12th century, the area belonged to Principality of Smolensk and subsequently to Principality of Toropets. In the beginning of the 13th century, it was included into Principality of Rzhev. From the 13th century, the area was the battlefield between Vladimir-Suzdal (later the Grand Duchy of Moscow) and the Grand Duchy of Lithuania and changed hands many times. The first locality in the current area of the district, the selo of Urdom, was mentioned in the chronicles in 1323. In the end of the 14th century, the area was finally under control of Moscow.

In the course of the administrative reform carried out in 1708 by Peter the Great, the area was split between Smolensk Governorate and Ingermanlandia Governorate (since 1710 known as Saint Petersburg Governorate). In 1727 Novgorod Governorate split off from Saint Petersburg Governorate. In 1775, Tver Viceroyalty was formed from the lands which previously belonged to Moscow and Novgorod Governorates, and the northeastern part of the area was transferred to Tver Viceroyalty, which in 1796 was transformed to Tver Governorate. In 1775, Rzhevsky Uyezd was established, with the center in Rzhev. The southeastern part belonged to Belsky Uyezd of Smolensk Governorate, with the exception of the brief periods between 1713 and 1726, when it belonged to Riga Governorate, and between 1775 and 1796, when Smolensk Governorate was transformed into Smolensk Viceroyalty. Olenino was founded in 1898 as a settlement serving the railway station.

On 12 July 1929, governorates and uyezds were abolished, and Oleninsky District with the administrative center in the settlement of Olenino was established. It belonged to Rzhev Okrug of Western Oblast. On August 1, 1930, the okrugs were abolished, and the districts were subordinated directly to the oblast. On 29 January 1935 Kalinin Oblast was established, and Oleninsky District was transferred to Kalinin Oblast. During World War II, in 1941–1943, the district was occupied by German troops. On 13 February 1963, Oleninsky District was abolished and merged into Nelidovsky District; on 4 March 1964, it was reestablished. In 1990, Kalinin Oblast was renamed Tver Oblast.

On 12 July 1929 Molodotudsky District, with the center in the selo of Molodoy Tud was created as well. It was a part of Rzhev Okrug of Western Oblast. On 1 February 1932 it was abolished. On March 5, 1935 Chertolinsky District with the administrative center in the selo of Chertolino was established. It was a part of Kalinin Oblast. On 20 March 1936 Chertolino was transferred to Rzhevsky District, and Chertolinsky District was renamed Molodotudsky. The administrative center was moved to Molodoy Tud. On 22 August 1958 Molodotudsky District was abolished and split between Kirovsky, Oleninsky, and Rzhevsky Districts.

== Economy ==
=== Industry ===
There are enterprises of food and timber industries, located in Olenino.

=== Agriculture ===
The main agricultural specializations of the district are cattle breeding with meat and milk production, as well as crops, flax, and potato growing.

=== Transportation ===
The railway which connects Moscow and Riga via Rzhev, crosses the district from east to west. There is passenger railway traffic. Olenino is the biggest railway station in the district.

The M9 highway connecting Moscow with Riga also crosses the district, passing Olenino. There are also local roads with bus traffic originating from Olenino.

== Culture and recreation ==
The district contains eight cultural heritage monuments of federal significance and additionally 134 objects classified as cultural and historical heritage of local significance. The federally protected monuments are the buildings of the Tatyevo Estate in the selo of Tatyevo.

There are local museums in Olenino and in Tatyevo.
