= Bely, Tver Oblast =

Town in Tver Oblast, Russia

Bely Белый
- Town
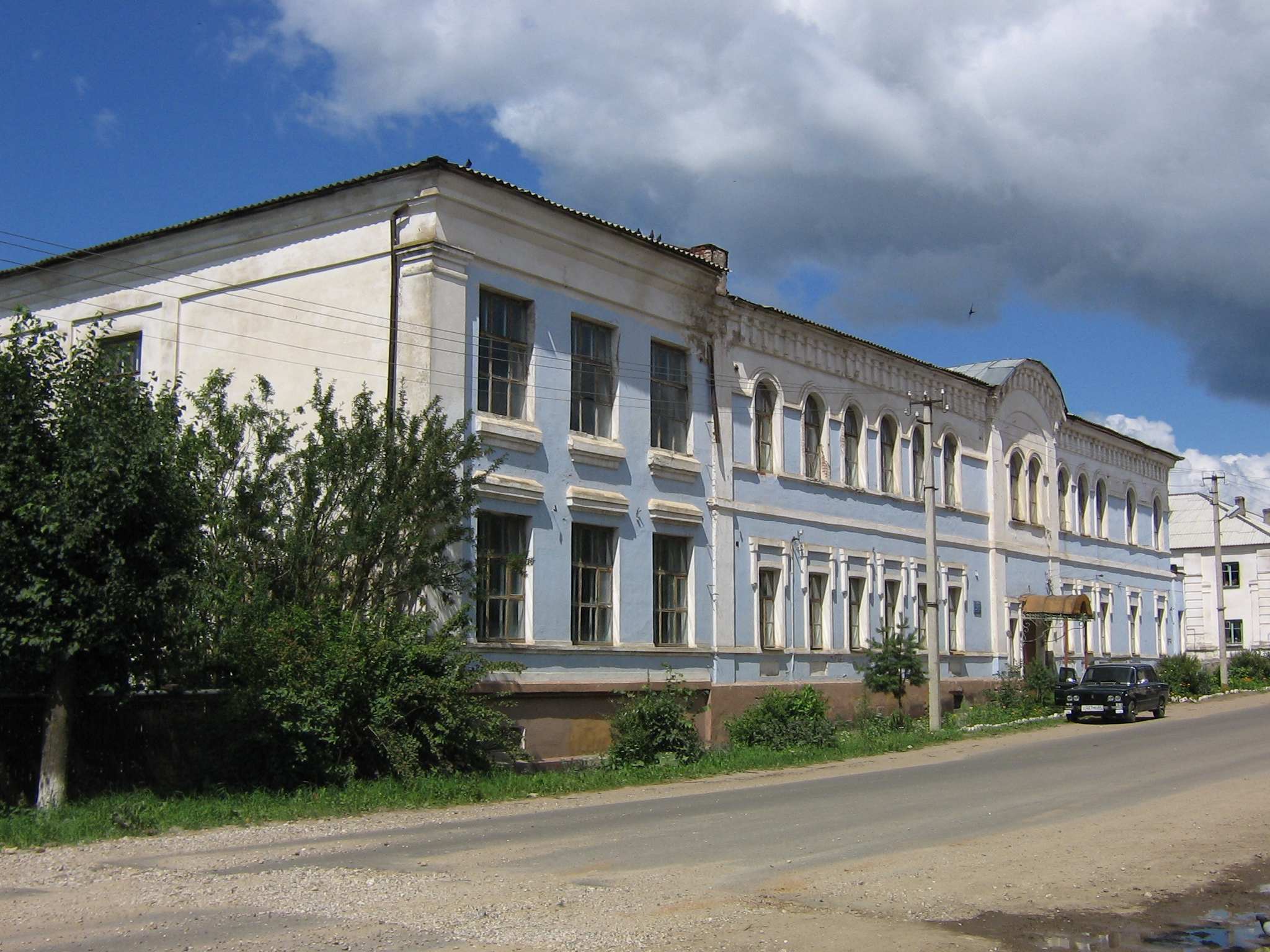
- Former girls' college

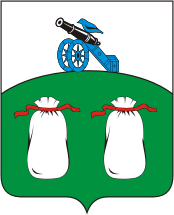
- Coat of arms
- Interactive map of Bely
- Location of Bely Bely (Tver Oblast)
- Coordinates: 55°50′N 32°57′E
- Country: Russia
- Federal subject: Tver Oblast
- Administrative district: Belsky District
- Urban settlementSelsoviet: Bely
- First mentioned: 1359
- Elevation: 185 m (607 ft)

Population (2010 Census)
  - Total: 3,772
  - Estimate (2021): 3,125 (−17.2%)

Administrative status
  - Capital of: Belsky District, Bely Urban Settlement

Municipal status
  - Municipal district: Belsky Municipal District
  - Urban settlement: Bely Urban Settlement
  - Capital of: Belsky Municipal District, Bely Urban Settlement
- Time zone: UTC+3 (MSK)
- Postal code: 172530
- OKTMO ID: 28606101001

Bely (Russian: Бе́лый) is a town and the administrative center of Belsky District in Tver Oblast, Russia. It is located on the Obsha River. Population: 3,772 (2010 census); 4,350 (2002 census); 5,228 (1989 Soviet census); 6,900 (1897).

== History ==
The name of the town means "white" in Russian, although it is unknown how or why this name originated. The fortress of Bely is first mentioned in a chronicle in 1350, since it was conquered by the Grand Duchy of Lithuania. It was located on the border between Lithuanian and Russian lands, and intermittently changed affiliation between Lithuania (later Poland) and the Grand Duchy of Moscow. In the 15th century, it became the seat of the Belsky branch of the ruling House of Gediminas. The town was overrun by the Grand Duchy of Moscow in 1503. Three years later, Muscovites built a formidable castle, which the Lithuanians laid a siege to in 1508. The town was again subordinated to the Polish–Lithuanian Commonwealth between 1618 and 1654, after which it finally went under Moscow.

In the course of the administrative reform carried out in 1708 by Peter the Great, Bely became the center of Belsky Uyezd of Smolensk Governorate and remained there until 1929, with the exception of the brief periods between 1713 and 1726, when it belonged to Riga Governorate, and between 1775 and 1796, when Smolensk Governorate was transformed into Smolensk Viceroyalty.

On 12 July 1929, governorates and uyezds were abolished, and Belsky District with the administrative center in the Bely was established. It belonged to Rzhev Okrug of Western Oblast. On August 1, 1930, the okrugs were abolished, and the districts were subordinated directly to the oblast. On 29 January 1935 Kalinin Oblast was established, and Belsky District was transferred to Kalinin Oblast. During World War II, in 1941–1943, the district was occupied by German troops, and Bely was severely damaged. On August 22, 1944, the district was transferred to newly established Velikiye Luki Oblast. On October 2, 1957, Velikiye Luki Oblast was abolished, and Belsky District was transferred back to Kalinin Oblast. On February 13, 1963 the district was abolished and merged into Nelidovsky District; on November 3, 1965 it was re-established. In 1990, Kalinin Oblast was renamed Tver Oblast.

== Administrative and municipal status ==
Within the framework of administrative divisions, Bely serves as the administrative center of Belsky District. As an administrative division, it is incorporated within Belsky District as Bely Urban Settlement. As a municipal division, this administrative unit also has urban settlement status and is a part of Belsky Municipal District.

== Economy ==
The district has potential for the development of local history tourism, a tourist passport of the district has been compiled. The main tourist routes are connected with the events of World War II.

=== Industry ===
There are enterprises of timber and food industries located in Bely.

=== Transportation ===
A paved road connecting Nelidovo and Smolensk via Dukhovshchina passes Bely. There are local roads. The closest railway stations are in Nelidovo (on the railway connecting Moscow and Riga via Velikiye Luki) and Vladimirsky Tupik (the terminus of a railway which branches off in Safonovo from the line connecting Moscow and Smolensk.

== Culture and recreation ==
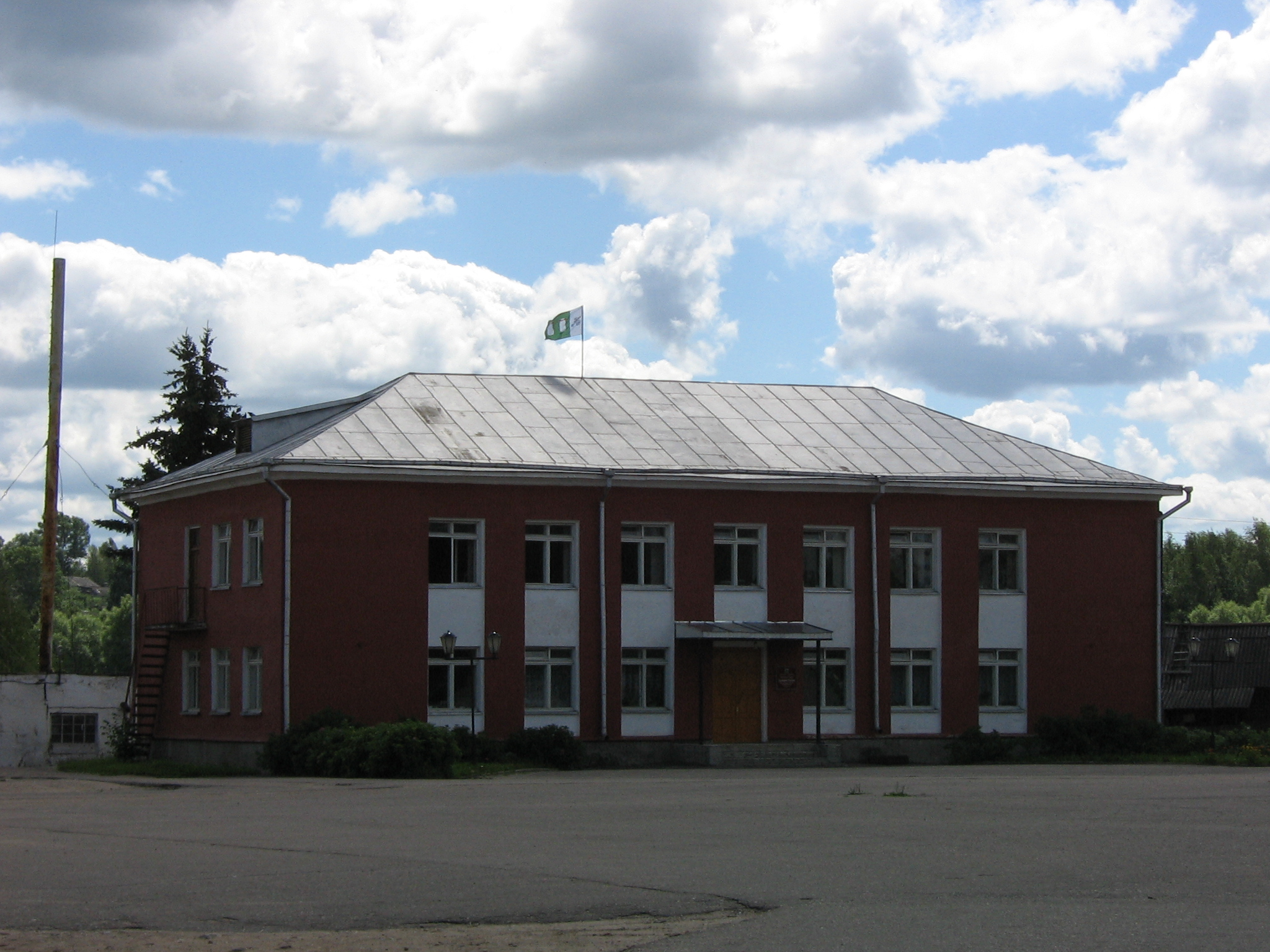
The building of district administration

Bely contains five cultural heritage monuments of federal significance and additionally sixty-five objects classified as cultural and historical heritage of local significance. The federally protected monuments are archeological sites related to the old town of Bely.

There is a local museum in Bely, founded in 1925.
