= Oleninsky =

Oleninsky (masculine), Oleninskaya (feminine), or Oleninskoye (neuter) may refer to:

- Oleninsky District, a district of Tver Oblast, Russia
- Oleninskoye, Ryazan Oblast, a rural locality (a village) in Ryazan Oblast, Russia
- Oleninskoye, Yaroslavl Oblast, a rural locality (a village) in Yaroslavl Oblast, Russia
