= Zharkovsky (urban-type settlement) =

Zharkovsky Жарковский
- Work settlement
- Interactive map of Zharkovsky
- Location of Zharkovsky Zharkovsky (Tver Oblast)
- Coordinates: 55°50′53″N 32°15′56″E
- Country: Russia
- Federal subject: Tver Oblast
- Administrative district: Zharkovsky District
- urban-type settlement: 1950

Population (2010 Census)
  - Total: 4,014
  - Estimate (2021): 2,952 (−26.5%)

Administrative status
  - Capital of: Zharkovsky District

Municipal status
  - Municipal district: Zharkovsky Municipal District
  - Urban settlement: Urban Settlement Zharkovsky
  - Capital of: Zharkovsky Municipal District, Urban Settlement Zharkovsky
- Time zone: UTC+3 (MSK)
- Postal code: 172460
- OKTMO ID: 28614151051

Zharkovsky (Russian: Жарко́вский) is an urban-type settlement and the administrative center of Zharkovsky District of Tver Oblast, Russia. It is located on the banks of the Mezha River. Population: 4,014 (2010 census); 4,993 (2002 census); 6,491 (1989 Soviet census).

== History ==
Before 1945, there were several villages in the place of current urban-type settlement, including the village of Zharki. It belonged to Smolensk Governorate. In the end of the 1920s, a saw mill was built, and eventually it was connected with the railway to the main railroad connecting Moscow and Riga. The railway was in operation since 1930.

On 12 July 1929, governorates and uyezds were abolished, and the area was included into Oktyabrsky District of Western Oblast. It belonged to Velikiye Luki Okrug. On August 1, 1930, the okrugs were abolished, and the districts were subordinated directly to the oblast. On 29 January 1935 Kalinin Oblast was established, and Oktyabrsky District was transferred to Kalinin Oblast. During World War II, in 1941–1943, the area was occupied by German troops. On August 22, 1944, the district was transferred to newly established Velikiye Luki Oblast. On 10 March 1945, Zharkovsky District with the center at the railway station of Zharki was established. In 1950, a number of villages were merged into the urban-type settlement of Zharkovsky, which became the administrative center of the district. On October 2, 1957, Velikiye Luki Oblast was abolished, and Zharkovsky District was transferred to Kalinin Oblast. In 1990, Kalinin Oblast was renamed Tver Oblast.

== Economy ==
=== Industry ===
The economy of Zharkovsky is based on timber industry. There are also enterprises producing food.

=== Transportation ===
A railroad connects Zharkovsky railway station with the station of Zemtsy on the railway between Moscow and Riga. There is infrequent passenger traffic, two times per week as of 2015. The branch is not electrified.

A paved road connects Zharkovsky with Zapadnaya Dvina.

== Culture and recreation ==
In Zharkovsky, there is one object classified as cultural and historical heritage of local significance. It is a monument to the soldiers fallen in the World War II.
