= Obsha =

Location
- Country: Russia

Physical characteristics
- Source
  - location: Smolensk Highland
- Mouth: Mezha
  - coordinates: 55°54′59″N 32°31′38″E
- Length: 153 km (95 mi)
- Basin size: 2,080 km^{2} (800 sq mi)
- Discharge
  - average: 11.5 m^{3}/s (410 cu ft/s)

Basin features
- Progression: Mezha→ Daugava→ Baltic Sea

The Obsha (Russian: Обша) is a river in Sychyovsky District of Smolensk Oblast and Oleninsky, Belsky, and Zharkovsky Districts of Tver Oblasts, Russia. It is a left tributary of the Mezha (Western Dvina basin). The Obsha is 153 kilometres (95 mi) long, and the area of its basin 2,080 square kilometres (800 sq mi). The town of Bely is located on the banks of the Obsha.

The Obsha River originates in the northwestern area of Sychyovsky District. It flows initially to the north, then turns westward as it enters Tver Oblast. Along its course, it serves as the boundary between Smolensk and Tver Oblasts for a section. Moving further, it passes through the southern region of Oleninsky District, and a brief segment of the Obsha forms part of the border between Oleninsky and Belsky Districts. Downstream of the village of Antipino it departs from the border and flows southwest, through the town of Bely. In Bely, it turns northwest and crosses into Zharkovsky District. The mouth of the Obsha is located by the village of Ustye.

The drainage basin of the Obsha includes almost the entire Belsky District, as well as minor areas in the west of Sychyovsky District, in the south of Oleninsky District, in the northeast of Zharkovsky District, and in the north of Kholm-Zhirkovsky District of Smolensk Oblast.
