= Dukhovshchinsky District =

Dukhovshchinsky District Духовщинский район (Russian)
- District
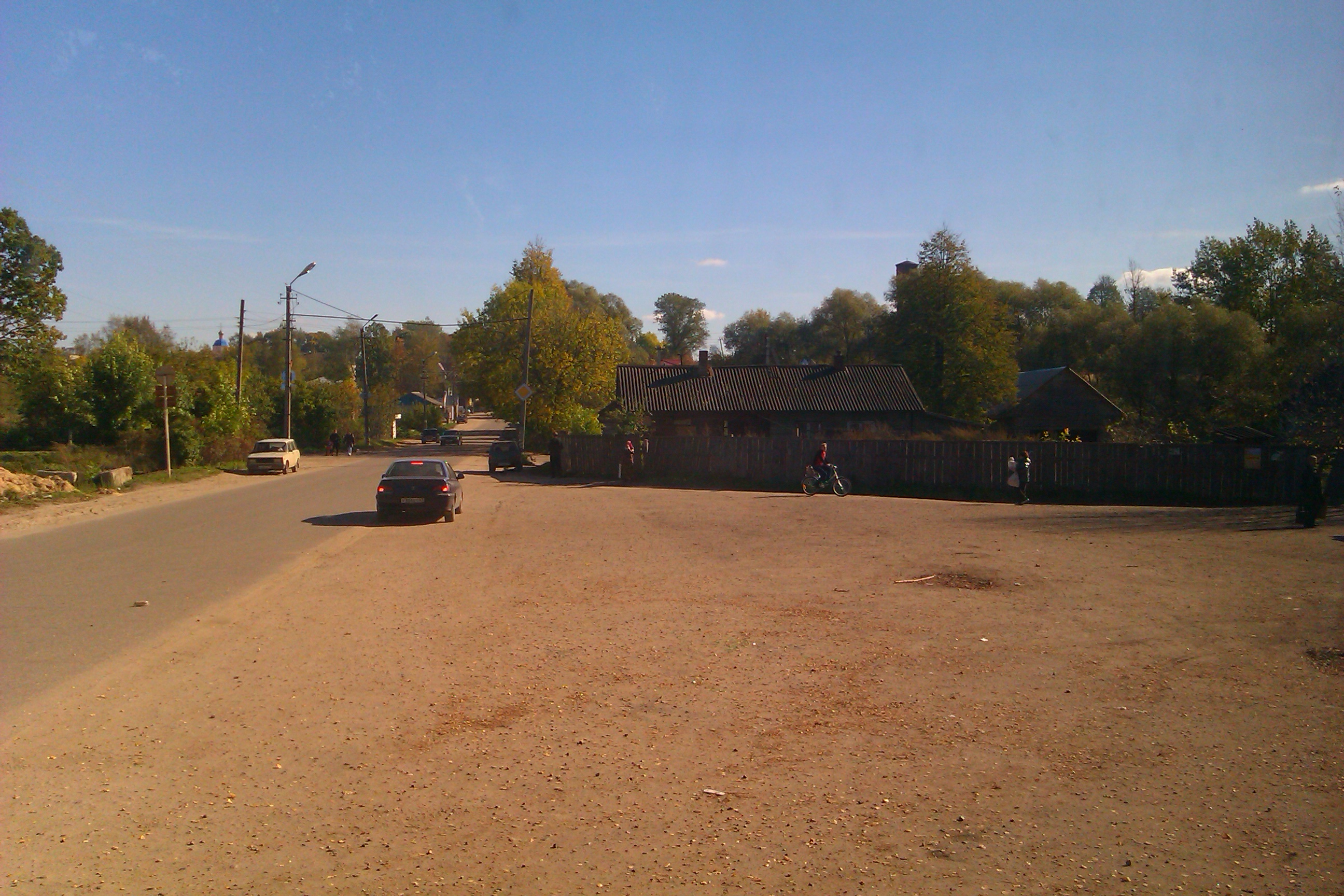
- Dukhovshchina, Dukhovshchinsky District

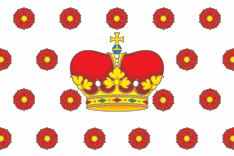
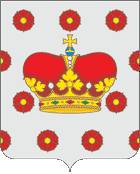
- Flag Coat of arms
- Location of Dukhovshchinsky District in Smolensk Oblast
- Coordinates: 55°12′N 32°25′E
- Country: Russia
- Federal subject: Smolensk Oblast
- Established: 1929
- Administrative center: Dukhovshchina

Area
  - Total: 2,610.78 km^{2} (1,008.03 sq mi)

Population (2010 Census)
  - Total: 16,658
  - Density: 6.3805/km^{2} (16.525/sq mi)
  - Urban: 61.9%
  - Rural: 38.1%

Administrative structure
  - Administrative divisions: 1 Urban settlements (towns), 1 Urban settlements (urban-type settlements), 6 Rural settlements
  - Inhabited localities: 1 cities/towns, 1 urban-type settlements, 229 rural localities

Municipal structure
  - Municipally incorporated as: Dukhovshchinsky Municipal District
  - Municipal divisions: 2 urban settlements, 6 rural settlements
- Time zone: UTC+3 (MSK)
- OKTMO ID: 66616000
- Website: http://duhov.admin-smolensk.ru/

Dukhovshchinsky District (Russian: Духовщи́нский райо́н) is an administrative and municipal district (raion), one of the twenty-five in Smolensk Oblast, Russia. It is located in the north of the oblast and borders with Belsky District of Tver Oblast in the north, Kholm-Zhirkovsky District in the northeast, Yartsevsky District in the east, Kardymovsky District in the south, Smolensky District in the southwest, Demidovsky District in the west, and with Zharkovsky District of Tver Oblast in the northwest. The area of the district is 2,610.78 square kilometers (1,008.03 sq mi). Its administrative center is the town of Dukhovshchina. Population: 16,658 (2010 Census); 19,182 (2002 census); 23,720 (1989 Soviet census). The population of Dukhovshchina accounts for 42.4% of the district's total population.

== Geography ==
The area of the district is split between the drainage basins of the Dnieper (south and center) and the Western Dvina rivers (north). The main rivers in district are the Arzhat in the basin of the Western Dvina, the Gobza, a right tributary of the Kasplya, also in the basin of the Western Dvina, the Khmost a tributary of the Dnieper, and the Tsarevich and the Votrya, both tributaries of the Vop, another right tributary of the Dnieper.

== Economy ==
=== Transportation ===
A paved road which connects M1 in Kamenka with M9 in Nelidovo crosses the district from south to north, passing Dukhovshchina. It also provides connection to Bely. Dukhovshchina is also connected by roads with Demidov and with Yartsevo. There are also local roads, with bus traffic originating from Dukhovshchina.

The closest railway stations are in Smolensk and in Yartsevo.
