= Central Forest Nature Reserve =

Nature reserve in Tver Oblast, Russia

- Russian: Центрально-Лесной заповедник (Also: Tsentralno-Lesnoi)
- IUCN category Ia (strict nature reserve)
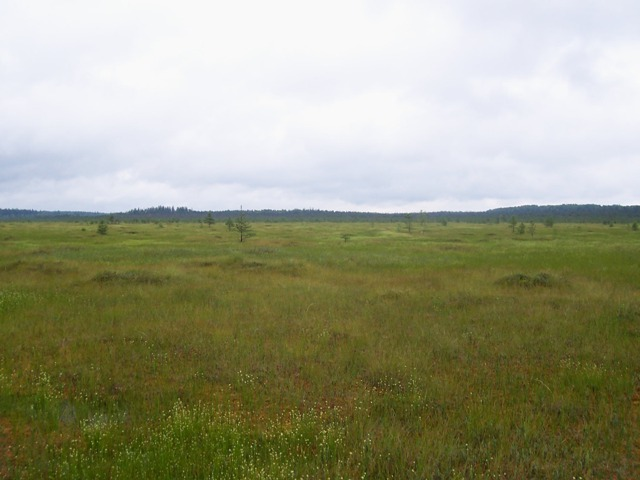
- Staroselsky Mokh swamp

- Location within Russia
- Location: Russia
- Nearest city: Nelidovo
- Coordinates: 56°27′18″N 32°58′36″E
- Area: 21,000 ha (81 sq mi)
- Established: 4 May 1930; 1 April 1960
- Website: www.clgz.ru

Central Forest Nature Reserve (Russian: Центрально-Лесной заповедник) (also, Tsentralno-Lesnoi) is a zapovednik (strict ecological reserve) in the north-west of Russia, located in Andreapolsky and Nelidovsky Districts of Tver Oblast, in the upper course of the Mezha River. It was established on 4 May 1930. The nature reserve is created to protect the conifer forest in the upper course of the Western Dvina River. Since 1985, it is classified as UNESCO Biosphere Reserve.

== Geography ==
The nature reserve is located at the south-western part of the Valdai Hills, close to the divide between the drainage basins of the Atlantic (the Western Dvina and the Lovat) and the Caspian Sea (the Volga). It includes a part of the lake district which is formed at the divide. The landscape within the nature reserve is mainly hilly, with a large area occupied by swamps. The altitude varies between 220 metres (720 ft) to 270 metres (890 ft).

== Ecoregion and climate ==
The reserve is in the Sarmatic mixed forests ecoregion, a band of mixed oak/spruce/pine forests stretching from southern Sweden to the Ural Mountains. The climate is Humid continental climate, cool summer (Köppen climate classification (Dfb)). This climate is characterized by large swings in temperature, both diurnally and seasonally, with mild summers and cold, snowy winters

== Flora and fauna ==
The area is covered by forest, with spruce being the most common tree, followed by silver birch, common aspen, and grey alder. The latter three species mainly grow in the areas damaged from timber logging in the 1950s. The reserve lies at the southernmost limit of the area where dwarf birch grows.

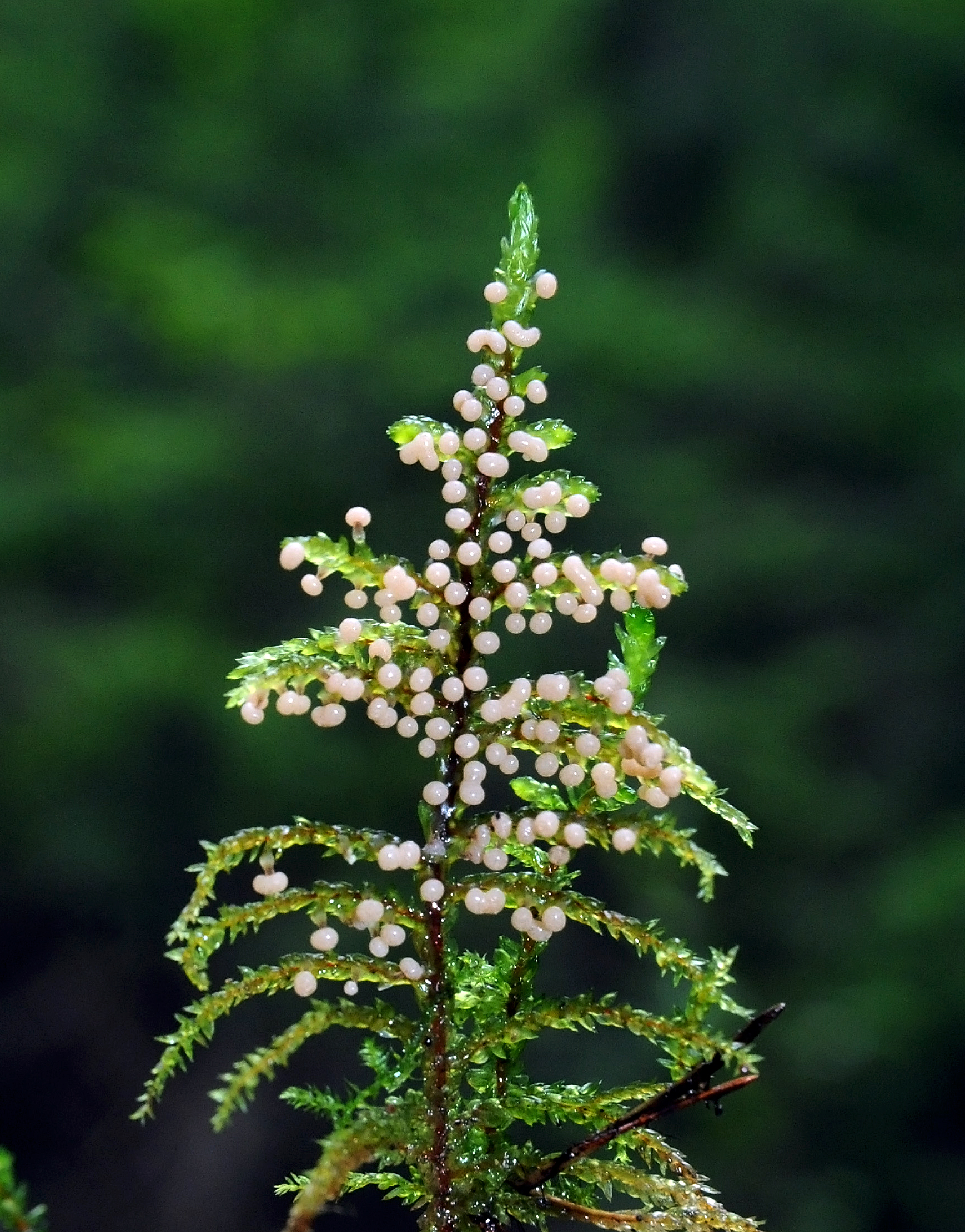
Mycetozoa on Red Stem Feather Moss (Pleurozium schreberi in Central Forest Reserve

As of 1988, 55 mammal species could be found in the reserve. These include Eurasian brown bear, lynx, red fox, moose, wild boar, and roe deer. Eurasian beaver was reintroduced in 1936. There were 195 species of birds, 6 species of amphibians, and several reptile species as well.

== History ==
Field research aimed at establishing a nature reserve in Central Russia started in 1926. The area south of the current location of the nature reserve was designated, however, the nature reserve was not established, and timber companies quickly cut all the forest there, so that the nature reserve had to be established in the upper course of the Mezha. The nature reserve was established on 4 May 1930 and opened on 31 December 1931. It contained two parts, one at the current location and another one close to the Zemtsy railway station. The total area of the reserve was 350 square kilometres (140 mi^{2}).

In 1951, the nature reserve was abolished, and timber production started. As a result, the whole southern part was destroyed, and about 6 square kilometres (2.3 mi^{2}) of woods were cut in the northern part. On 1 April 1960 the nature reserve was re-established, with the area of 210 square kilometres (81 mi^{2}). In 1981, a protected area was created around the borders of the nature reserve. Timber logging is prohibited in this protected area.
