= Mezha (Daugava) =

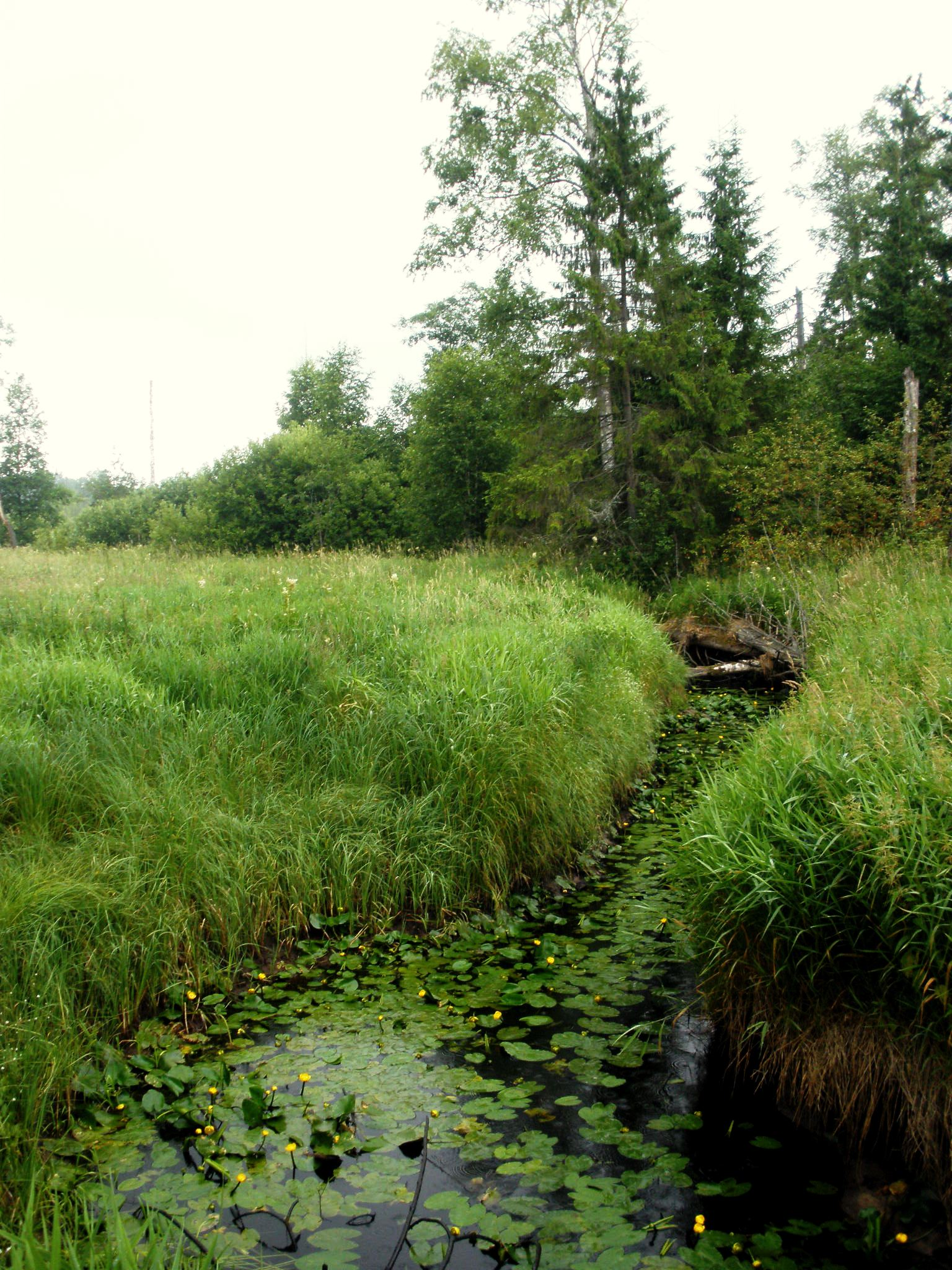
- The upper course of the Mezha

Location
- Country: Russia

Physical characteristics
- Source
  - location: Valdai Hills
- Mouth: Daugava (Western Dvina)
  - coordinates: 55°43′08″N 31°29′02″E
- Length: 259 km (161 mi)
- Basin size: 9,080 km^{2} (3,510 sq mi)
- Discharge
  - average: 61 m^{3}/s (2,200 cu ft/s)

Basin features
- Progression: Daugava→ Baltic Sea
- Tributaries
  - left: Obsha

The Mezha (Russian: Межа) is a river in Nelidovsky, Zharkovsky, and Zapadnodvinsky Districts of Tver Oblast and Velizhsky District of Smolensk Oblast in Russia. It flows out of the Valdai Hills and continues west into the Daugava (Western Dvina). The town of Nelidovo and the urban-type settlement of Zharkovsky are located along the Mezha. The Mezha is 259 kilometres (161 mi) long, and drains a basin of 9,080 square kilometres (3,510 sq mi). Its main tributaries are the Bereza, the Luchesa, the Obsha, and the Yelsha (all left).

The source of the Mezha is in the north-western part of Nelidovsky District, within the Central Forest Nature Reserve, a highly protected natural area. It flows south, downstream of the town of Nelidovo, turns southwest and crosses into Zharkovsky District. It accepts the Obsha from the left and turns west. Downstream of the urban-type settlement of Zharkovsky it turns northwest. Further downstream, the Mezha flows southwest, making the border between the Zharkovsky and Zapadnodvinsky districts, and then west making the border between Tver and Smolensk Oblasts. The mouth of the Mezha is the triple point where Tver, Smolensk, and Pskov Oblasts meet.

The drainage basin of the Mezha includes the whole area of Belsky District of Tver Oblast, the major parts of Nelidovsky and Zharkovsky Districts, the western part of Oleninsky District, also of Tver Oblast, and the eastern part of Zapadnodvinsky District, as well as the western part of Sychyovsky District and northern parts of Kholm-Zhirkovsky, Dukhovshchinsky, Demisovsky, and Velizhsky Districts of Smolensk Oblast.
