= Dukhovshchina, Smolensk Oblast =

Town in Smolensk Oblast, Russia

Dukhovshchina Духовщина
- Town
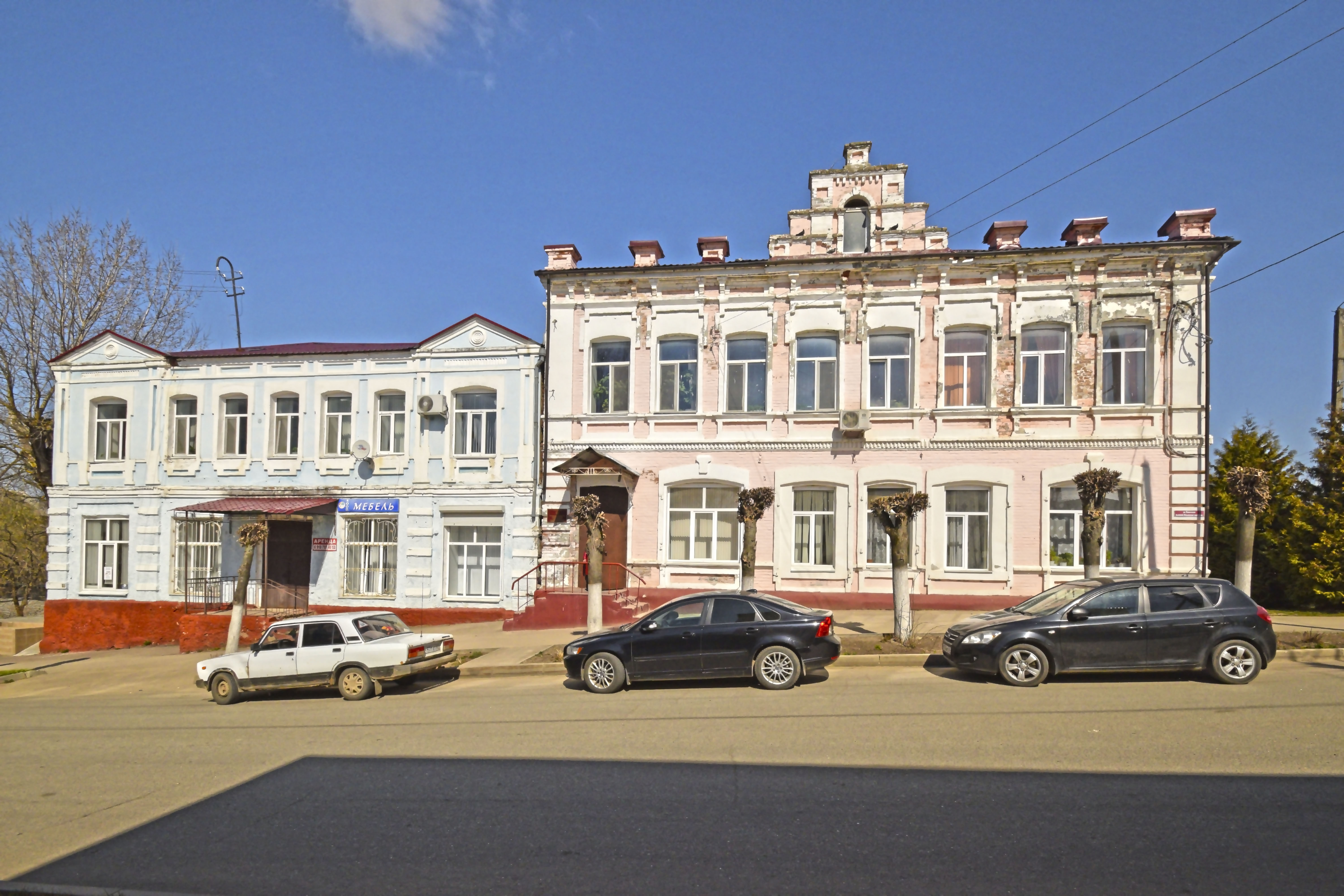

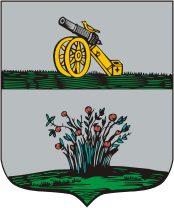
- Coat of arms
- Interactive map of Dukhovshchina
- Location of Dukhovshchina Dukhovshchina (European Russia) Dukhovshchina (Russia)
- Coordinates: 55°11′N 32°25′E
- Country: Russia
- Federal subject: Smolensk Oblast
- Administrative district: Dukhovshchinsky District
- Urban settlementSelsoviet: Dukhovshchinskoye
- Founded: 1675 (Julian)
- Town status since: 1777

Area
  - Total: 10.89 km^{2} (4.20 sq mi)
- Elevation: 220 m (720 ft)

Population (2010 Census)
  - Total: 4,371
  - Estimate (2024): 3,866 (−11.6%)
  - Density: 401.4/km^{2} (1,040/sq mi)

Administrative status
  - Capital of: Dukhovshchinsky District, Dukhovshchinskoye Urban Settlement

Municipal status
  - Municipal district: Dukhovshchinsky Municipal District
  - Urban settlement: Dukhovshchinskoye Urban Settlement
  - Capital of: Dukhovshchinsky Municipal District, Dukhovshchinskoye Urban Settlement
- Time zone: UTC+3 (MSK)
- Postal code: 216200
- OKTMO ID: 66616101001

Dukhovshchina (Russian: Духовщина) is a town and the administrative center of Dukhovshchinsky District in Smolensk Oblast, Russia, located on the Vostitsa River 57 kilometers (35 mi) northeast of Smolensk, the administrative center of the oblast. Population: 4,371 (2010 census); 4,683 (2002 census); 5,747 (1989 Soviet census).

== Geography ==
=== Climate ===
Dukhovshchina has a warm-summer humid continental climate (Dfb in the Köppen climate classification).

Climate data for Dukhovshchina
Month	Jan	Feb	Mar	Apr	May	Jun	Jul	Aug	Sep	Oct	Nov	Dec	Year
Mean daily maximum °C (°F)	−4.6 (23.7)	−3.7 (25.3)	1.8 (35.2)	10.6 (51.1)	16.9 (62.4)	20.1 (68.2)	22.7 (72.9)	21.2 (70.2)	15.6 (60.1)	8.2 (46.8)	2.2 (36.0)	−1.9 (28.6)	9.1 (48.4)
Daily mean °C (°F)	−6.6 (20.1)	−6.1 (21.0)	−1.5 (29.3)	6.2 (43.2)	12.8 (55.0)	16.3 (61.3)	18.9 (66.0)	17.5 (63.5)	12.2 (54.0)	5.7 (42.3)	0.4 (32.7)	−3.6 (25.5)	6.0 (42.8)
Mean daily minimum °C (°F)	−9 (16)	−9 (16)	−5.1 (22.8)	1.3 (34.3)	7.8 (46.0)	11.7 (53.1)	14.6 (58.3)	13.5 (56.3)	8.6 (47.5)	3.2 (37.8)	−1.4 (29.5)	−5.6 (21.9)	2.6 (36.6)
Average precipitation mm (inches)	54 (2.1)	47 (1.9)	46 (1.8)	46 (1.8)	78 (3.1)	89 (3.5)	96 (3.8)	84 (3.3)	69 (2.7)	71 (2.8)	58 (2.3)	53 (2.1)	791 (31.2)
Source: https://en.climate-data.org/asia/russian-federation/smolensk-oblast/dukhovshchina-32855/

== History ==
Dukhovshchina developed on the spot of the Dukhov Monastery, established at some point in the 15th century. It was granted town status in 1777. It was captured by Napoleon's Grande Armée during the 1812 Battle of Smolensk and was occupied during World War II by the Wehrmacht from July 15, 1941 to September 19, 1943.

According to the 1939 census, 102 Jews were living in Dukhovshchina. The Jews were forced to work after the German invasion. The Jews were gathered in a ghetto, which was liquidated in the summer of 1942. During this time, 300 Jews perished in mass executions perpetrated by an Einsatzgruppen.

== Administrative and municipal status ==
Within the framework of administrative divisions, Dukhovshchina serves as the administrative center of Dukhovshchinsky District. As an administrative division, it is, together with one rural locality (the settlement of Lnozavod), incorporated within Dukhovshchinsky District as Dukhovshchinskoye Urban Settlement. As a municipal division, this administrative unit also has urban settlement status and is a part of Dukhovshchinsky Municipal District.
