= Western Oblast =

1929–1937 unit of Russia

Coordinates: 54°47′N 32°03′E

Western Oblast Западная область
- Oblast of the Russian SFSR
- 1929–1937
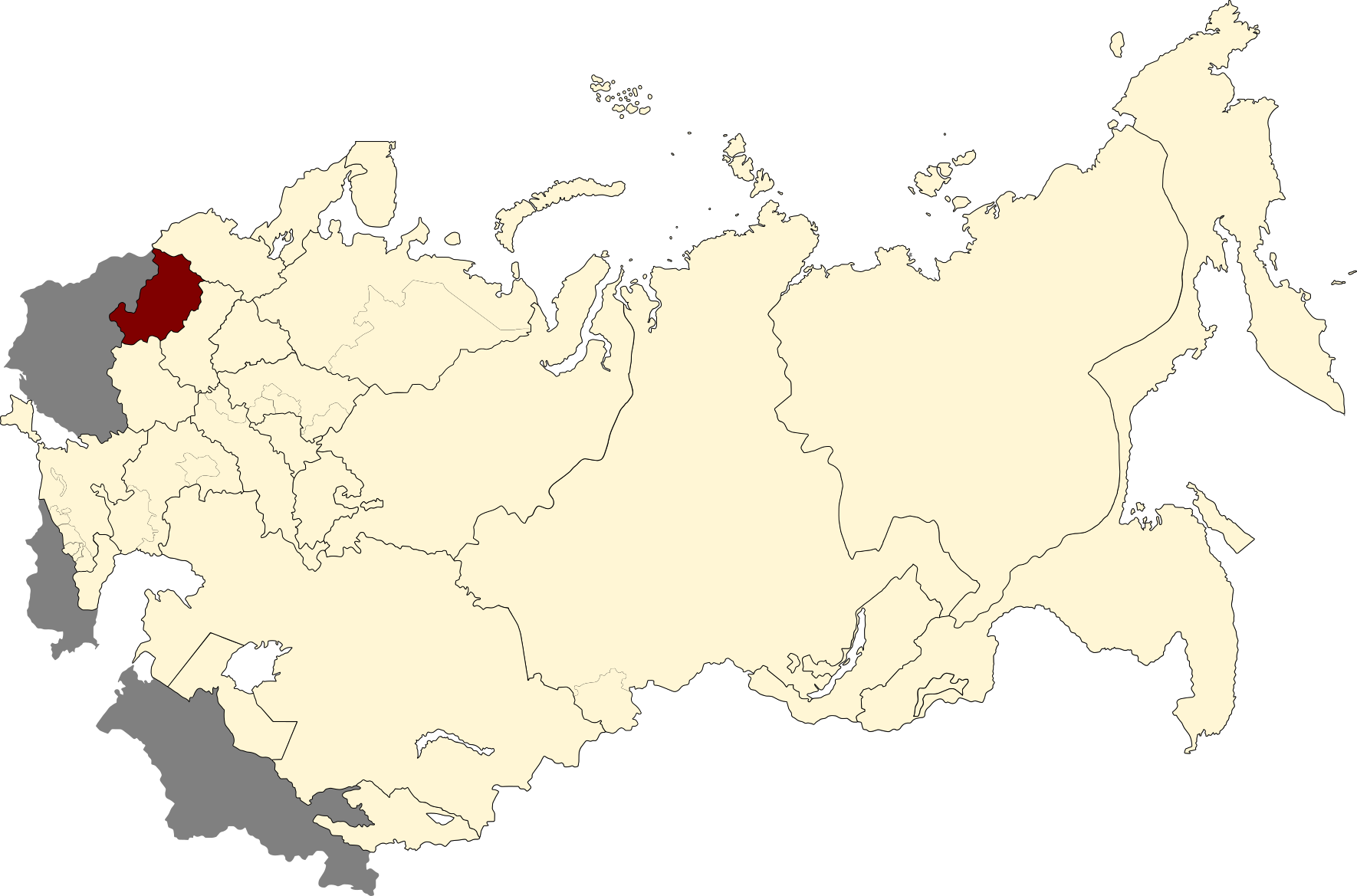
- Western Oblast, 1930.
- Capital: Smolensk
- Population
  - 1937: 4,693,495
- History
  - Established: 1 October 1929
  - Disestablished: 27 September 1937
- Political subdivisions: districts

Western Oblast (Russian: Западная область, romanized: Zapadnaya oblast) was an administrative-territorial unit (oblast) of the Russian SFSR from 1929 to 1937. Its seat was in the city of Smolensk. The oblast was located in the west of European Russia, and its territory is currently divided between Bryansk, Kaluga, Pskov, Smolensk, and Tver Oblasts.

According to the 1937 Soviet census, the population of the oblast was 4,693,495 persons. It was abolished on 27 September 1937.

== History ==
The oblast was established on 1 October 1929 by the All-Russian Central Executive Committee. The territory of the oblast was formed from Smolensk and Bryansk Governorates, parts of Moscow, Kaluga, and Tver Governorates, as well as Velikiye Luki Okrug of Leningrad Oblast. The oblast was subdivided into eight administrative districts (okrugs),

- Bryansk Okrug (with the seat located in Bryansk);
- Klintsy Okrug (Klintsy);
- Roslavl Okrug (Roslavl);
- Rzhev Okrug (Rzhev);
- Smolensk Okrug (Smolensk);
- Sukhinichi Okrug (Sukhinichi);
- Velikiye Luki Okrug (Velikiye Luki);
- Vyazma Okrug (Vyazma).

Before the oblast was established, the constituent governorates used the old division inherited from the Russian Empire (uezds). On 1 October 1929 the division of the oblast into districts was established.

The following districts have been established,

- In Bryansk Okrug: Brasovsky, Bryansky, Dyatkovsky, Karachevsky, Khotynetsky, Khvastovichsky, Komarichsky, Lyudinovsky, Navlinsky, Pesochensky, Sevsky, Shablykinsky, Suzemsky, Trubchevsky, Vygonichsky, Zhizdrinsky, Zhiryatinsky, and Zhukovsky.
- In Klintsy Okrug: Churovichsky, Gordeyevsky, Klimovsky, Klintsovsky, Krasnogorsky, Mglinsky, Novozybkovsky, Pogarsky, Ponurovsky, Pochepsky, Starodubsky, Surazhsky, and Unechsky.
- In Roslavl Okrug: Dubrovsky, Khislavichsky, Kletnyansky, Mokrovsky, Pochinkovsky, Rognedinsky, Roslavlsky, Shumyachsky, Stodolishchensky, Yekimovichsky, and Yershichsky.
- In Rzhev Okrug: Belsky, Kamensky, Karmanovsky, Lukovnikovsky, Molodotudsky, Nelidovsky, Oleninsky, Pogorelsky, Rzhevsky, Selizharovsky, Staritsky, Stepurinsky, Sychyovsky, Vysokovsky, Yeltsovsky, and Zubtsovsky.
- In Smolensk Okrug: Baturinsky, Demidovsky, Dorogobuzhsky, Dukhovshchinsky, Glinkovsky, Grinyovsky, Kardymovsky, Kasplyansky, Katynsky, Krasninsky, Monastyrshchinsky, Ponizovsky, Prechistensky, Rudnyansky, Safonovsky, Slobodskoy, Yartsevsky, and Yelninsky.
- In Sukhinichi Okrug: Baryatinsky, Duminichsky, Kozelsky, Meshchovsky, Mosalsky, Pavlinovsky, Plokhinsky, Spas-Demensky, Sukhinichsky, Vskhodsky, and Yukhnovsky.
- In Velikiye Luki Okrug: Bologovsky, Idritsky, Ilyinsky, Kholmsky, Kunyinsky, Leninsky, Loknyansky, Nasvinsky, Nevelsky, Novosokolnichesky, Oktyabrsky, Ostashkovsky, Penovsky, Porechyevsky, Pustoshkinsky, Rykovsky, Sebezhsky, Sovetsky, Toropetsky, Troitsky, Tsevelsky, Usmynsky, Ust-Dolyssky, Usvyatsky, Velizhsky, and Velikoluksky.
- In Vyazma Okrug: Bukharinsky, Gzhatsky, Izdeshkovsky, Iznoskovsky, Kholm-Zhirkovsky, Medynsky, Novoduginsky, Tyomkinsky, Uvarovsky, Voskresensky, Vyazemsky, and Znamensky.

On 10 May 1930 Uvarovsky District was transferred to Moscow Oblast. On 12 May of the same year Smolensk Okrug was renamed Yartsevo Okrug, and its seat was transferred to Yartsevo. On 1 August 1930 the okrugs were abolished, and the districts were subordinated directly to the oblast. Smolensk and Bryansk were made cities of the oblast significance.

On 20 September 1930 twelve districts were abolished: Bologovsky, Ponizovsky, Porechyevsky, Rykovsky, Slobodskoy, Sovetsky, Stepurinsky, Tsevelsky, Troitsky, Usmynsky, Ust-Dolyssky, Vysokovsky Districts. On 20 November of the same year Grinyovsky, Kardymovsky, and Katynsky Districts were abolished and merged into Smolensky District.

On 10 February 1931 Vskhodsky District was abolished. On 1 February 1932 eighteen more districts were abolished: Baturinsky, Churovichsky, Idritsky, Iznoskovsky, Kasplyansky, Khotinetsky, Kunyinsky, Mokrovsky, Molodotudsky, Nasvinsky, Pavlinovsky, Ponurovsky, Rognedinsky, Voskresensky, Vygonichsky, Yeltsovsky, Yershichsky, and Zhiryatinsky Districts. On 30 January 1934 Pogorelsky, Prechistensky, and Suzemsky Districts were abolished. On 28 December of the same year Plokhinsky District was renamed Rumyantsevsky. On 18 January 1935 a number of districts were established or re-established. These were Chertolinsky, Iznoskovsky, Kardymovsky, Kunyinsky, Penovsky, Pogorelsky, Ponizovsky, Prechistensky, Rognedinsky, Suzemsky, Tumanovsky, Voskresensky, Vskhodsky, and Yershichsky Districts.

On 29 January 1935 the northern part of Western Oblast was transferred into newly established Kalinin Oblast. It consisted of Chertolinsky, Kamensky, Kholmsky, Kunyinsky, Leninsky, Loknyansky, Lukovnikovsky, Nelidovsky, Nevelsky, Novosokolnichesky, Oktyabrsky, Oleninsky, Ostashkovsky, Penovsky, Pogorelsky, Pustoshkinsky, Rzhevsky, Sebezhsky, Selizharovsky, Staritsky, Toropetsky, Velikoluksky, and Zubtsovsky Districts.

On 27 December 1935 Voskresensky District was renamed Andreyevsky District, in January 1936 Pesochensky District was renamed Kirovsky District, and on 5 March 1937 Bukharinsky District was renamed Dzerzhinsky District, following the arrest of Nikolai Bukharin, subsequently executed. In 1937, Rumyantsevsky District was renamed Ulyanovsky, following the arrest of Ivan Rumyantsev, the first secretary of the Western Oblast Committee of the Bolshevik Party.

On 27 September 1937 the All-Russian Central Executive Committee issues a decree which abolished Western Oblast. It was split between Oryol and Smolensk Oblasts. In particular, the following 29 districts, Brasovsky, Bryansky, Dubrovsky, Dyatkovsky, Gordeyevsky, Karachevsky, Khvastovichsky, Kletnyansky, Klimovsky, Klintsovsky, Komarichsky, Krasnogorsky, Lyudinovsky, Mglinsky, Navlinsky, Novozybkovsky, Pochepsky, Pogarsky, Rognedinsky, Sevsky, Shablykinsky, Starodubsky, Suzemsky, Surazhsky, Trubchevsky, Ulyanovsky, Unechsky, Zhizdrinsky, and Zhukovsky Districts, were transferred to Oryol Oblast. The remaining 49 districts were transferred to Smolensk Oblast. These were Andreyevsky, Baryatinsky, Baturinsky, Belsky, Demidovsky, Dorogobuzhsky, Dukhovshchinsky, Duminichsky, Dzerzhinsky, Gzhatsky, Glinkovsky, Ilyinsky, Izdeshkovsky, Iznoskovsky, Kardymovsky, Karmanovsky, Kasplyansky, Khislavichsky, Kholm-Zhirkovsky, Kirovsky, Kozelsky, Krasnyansky, Medynsky, Meshchovsky, Monastyrshchinsky, Mosalsky, Novoduginsky, Ponizovsky, Pochinkovsky, Prechistensky, Roslavlsky, Rudnyansky, Safonovsky, Shumyachsky, Slobodskoy, Smolensky, Spas-Demensky, Sukhinichsky, Stodolishchensky, Sychyovsky, Tyomkinsky, Tumanovsky, Usvyatsky, Velizhsky, Vskhodsky, Vyazemsky, Yartsevsky, Yekimovichsky, Yelninsky, Yershichsky, Yukhnovsky, and Znamensky Districts.

The most important authority in the oblast was the first secretary of the VKP(b) Oblast Committee. The following persons were the first secretaries,

- Ivan Petrovich Rumyantsev (1929–1937), executed during the Great Purge;
- Demyan Sergeyevich Korotchenko (1937), acting first secretary.
