= M9 highway (Russia) =

Road in Russia

Federal Highway M9
- Федеральная автомобильная дорога М9
- Baltic Highway

Route information
- Part of E22
- Length: 610 km (380 mi)

Major junctions
- West end: Latvian border near Zasitino
- East end: MKAD in Moscow

Location
- Country: Russia

Highway system
- Russian Federal Highways
← M 8	→ M 10

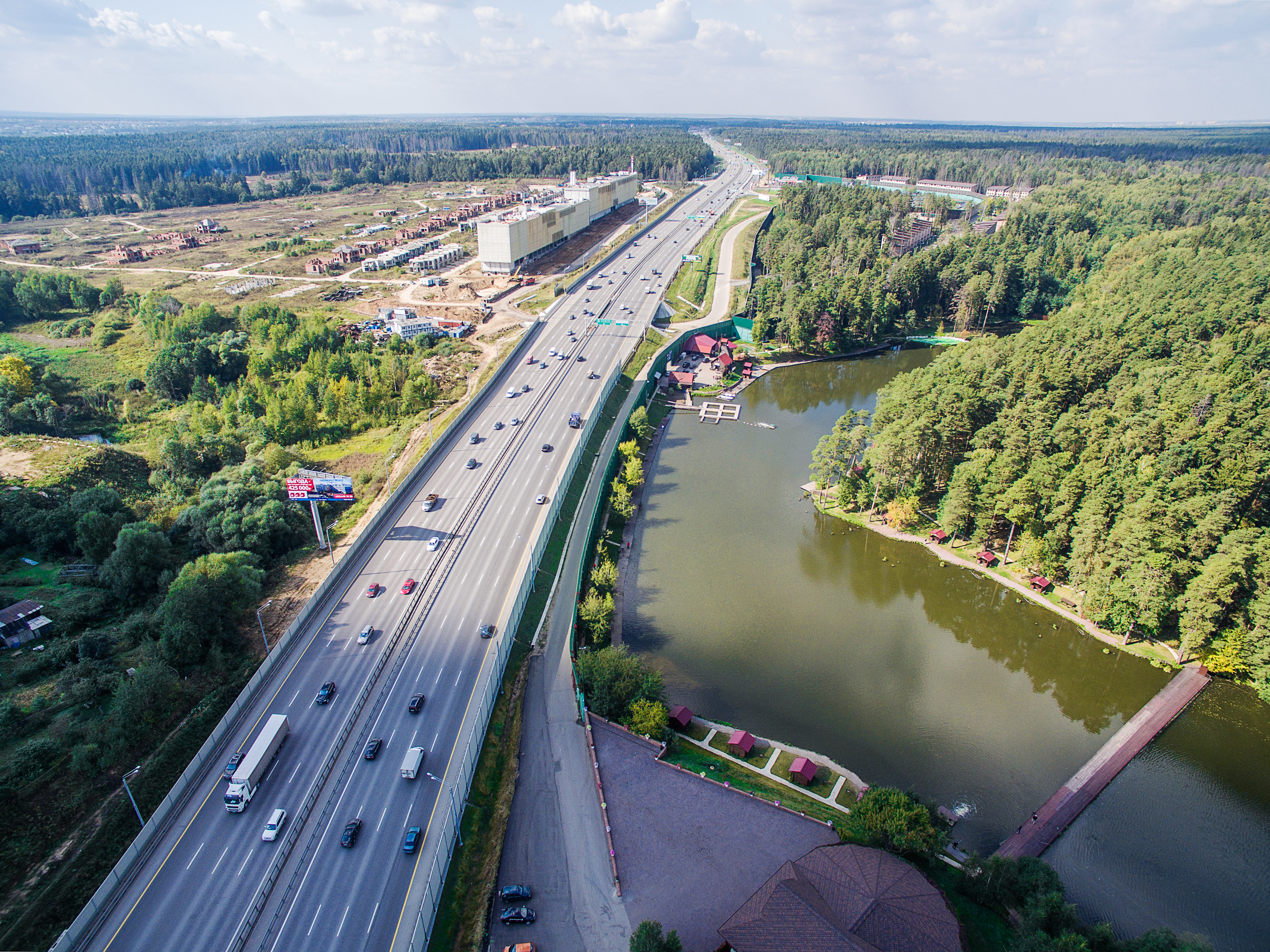
M9 highway

The Russian route M9, also known as the Baltic Highway, is a 610 km-long trunk road that leads from Moscow through Volokolamsk to Russia's border with Latvia. The road runs north of Moscow across the towns of Krasnogorsk, Istra, Volokolamsk, Zubtsov, Rzhev, Velikiye Luki, and Sebezh, ending up at the state border. It passes Moscow, Tver, and Pskov Oblasts. The highway forms a part of the European route E22 which continues across the border to Rēzekne and Riga.

In Moscow, the highway follows Zvenigorodskoe Shosse, Mnevniki Street, and Marshala Zhukova Avenue before crossing with Moscow Ring Road. The stretch between Moscow and Volokolamsk is known as Novorizhskoye Shosse. This is the only stretch (along with the part within the city of Moscow) built as a dual carriageway.
