= Rzhev =

Town in Tver Oblast, Russia

Rzhev Ржев
- Town of oblast significance
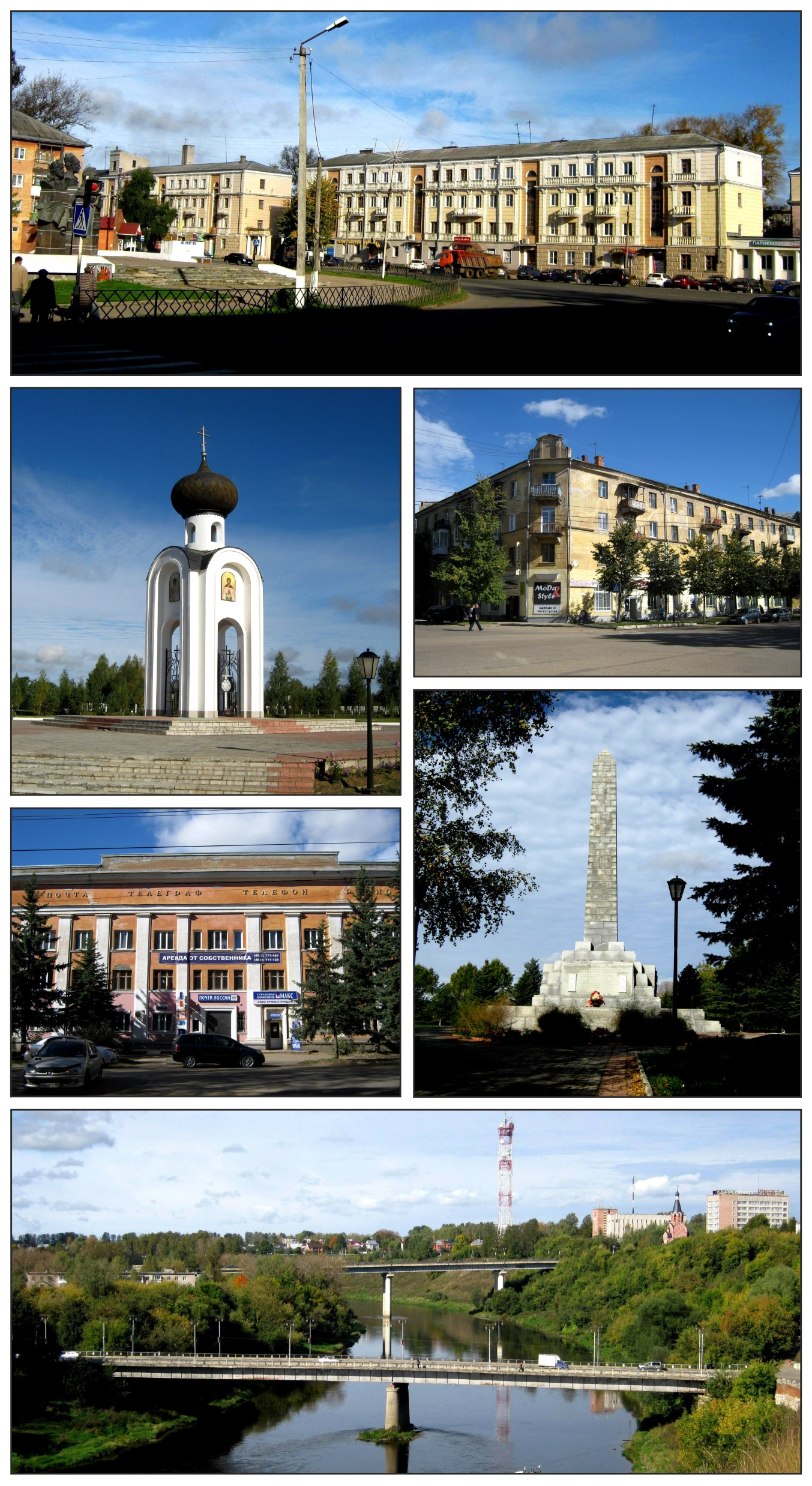
- Top:View of Rzhev Revolution Square and commercial area, Second:Alexander Nevsky Chapel, Rzhev Soviet (Russia) House, Third:Rzhev Herritage Post Office, Rzhev Libertors Obelisk, Bottom:Volzhskie Bridge and Volga River (all items from left to right)

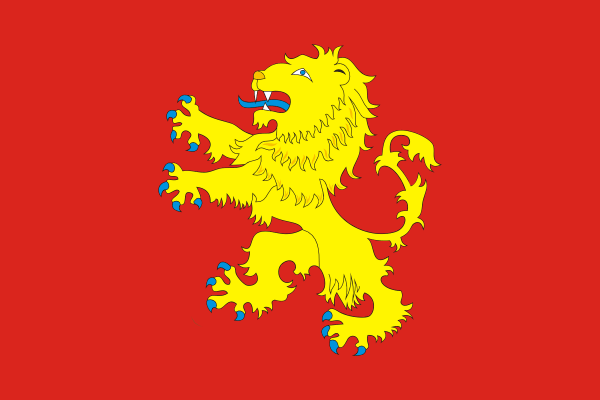
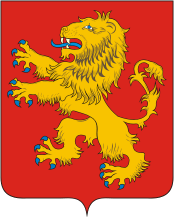
- Flag Coat of arms
- Interactive map of Rzhev
- Location of Rzhev Rzhev (Tver Oblast)
- Coordinates: 56°15′N 34°19′E
- Country: Russia
- Federal subject: Tver Oblast
- First mentioned: 1216

Government
  - Head of Administration: Alexander Shcheteshin
- Elevation: 190 m (620 ft)

Population (2010 Census)
  - Total: 61,982
  - Estimate (2025): 52,619 (−15.1%)
  - Rank: 257th in 2010

Administrative status
  - Subordinated to: Rzhev Okrug
  - Capital of: Rzhevsky District, Rzhev Okrug

Municipal status
  - Urban okrug: Rzhev Urban Okrug
  - Capital of: Rzhev Urban Okrug, Rzhevsky Municipal District
- Time zone: UTC+3 (MSK)
- Postal code: 172380
- Dialing code: +7 48232
- OKTMO ID: 28745000001
- Website: www.rzhevcity.ru

Rzhev (Russian: Ржев, IPA: [ˈrʐɛf]) is a town in Tver Oblast, Russia, located 49 kilometers (30 mi) southwest of Staritsa and 126 kilometers (78 mi) from Tver, on the highway and railway connecting Moscow and Riga. It is the uppermost town situated on the Volga River. Population: 61,982 (2010 census); 63,729 (2002 census); 69,808 (1989 Soviet census).

== History ==
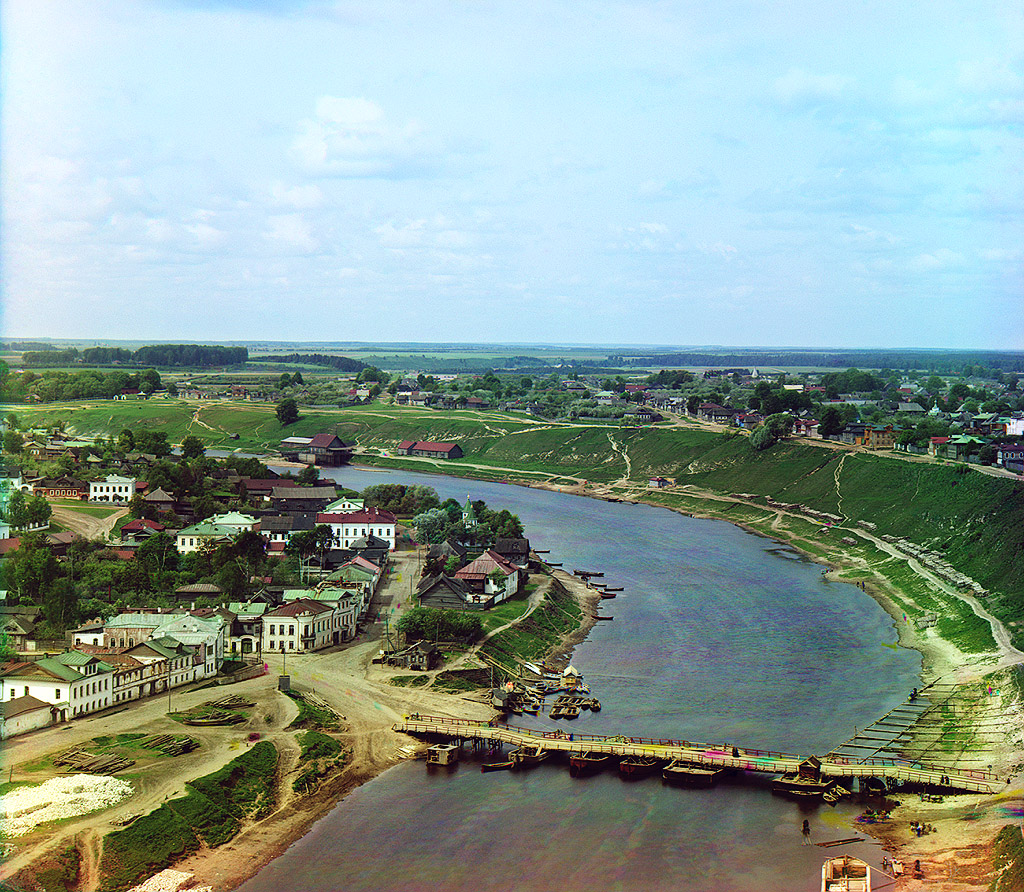
View of Rzhev before the October Revolution; photograph by Sergey Prokudin-Gorsky

Rzhev was founded in the Middle Ages and rivals Toropets as the oldest town in the region. Rzhevians usually point out that their town is mentioned in the Novgorod laws as early as 1019. Their neighbors from Toropets, on the other hand, give more credence to Rzhev's first mention in a major chronicle under 1216, when it was in possession of Mstislav the Bold, Prince of Toropets. Whatever the truth may be, it is clear that medieval Rzhev was bitterly contested by three regional powers—the Novgorod Republic, the Principality of Smolensk, and the Grand Principality of Vladimir-Suzdal. Following the Mongol invasion, Rzhev passed to a lateral branch of the Smolensk dynasty, which made the town its capital. Later the princes divided the town in two parts, which are still called the Prince-Dmitry's Side and Prince-Theodor's Side. In the mid-14th century, they had a hard time repelling attacks from Algirdas of the Grand Duchy of Lithuania and Grand Princes of Tver, who bought all the villages around the town. Finally, they left for Moscow, where their descendants (the Rzhevsky family) have become comic characters of many a joke. In the meantime, the town was occupied for a short space by Tver, Poland-Lithuania, and finally by the Grand Duchy of Moscow.

In the course of the administrative reform carried out in 1708 by Peter the Great, Rzhev was included into Ingermanlandia Governorate (since 1710 known as Saint Petersburg Governorate), and in 1727 Novgorod Governorate split off. In 1775, Tver Viceroyalty was formed from the lands which previously belonged to Moscow and Novgorod Governorates, and Rzhev was transferred to Tver Viceroyalty, which in 1796 was transformed to Tver Governorate. In 1775, Rzhevsky Uyezd was established, with the center in Rzhev. In the 18th century, local merchants, mainly of Old Believer confession, brought a great measure of prosperity to the town.

On 12 July 1929, governorates and uyezds were abolished, and Rzhevsky District with the administrative center in the town of Rzhev was established. It belonged to Rzhev Okrug of Western Oblast. On August 1, 1930, the okrugs were abolished, and the districts were subordinated directly to the oblast. On 29 January 1935 Kalinin Oblast was established, and Rzhev was transferred to Kalinin Oblast. In 1990, Kalinin Oblast was renamed Tver Oblast.

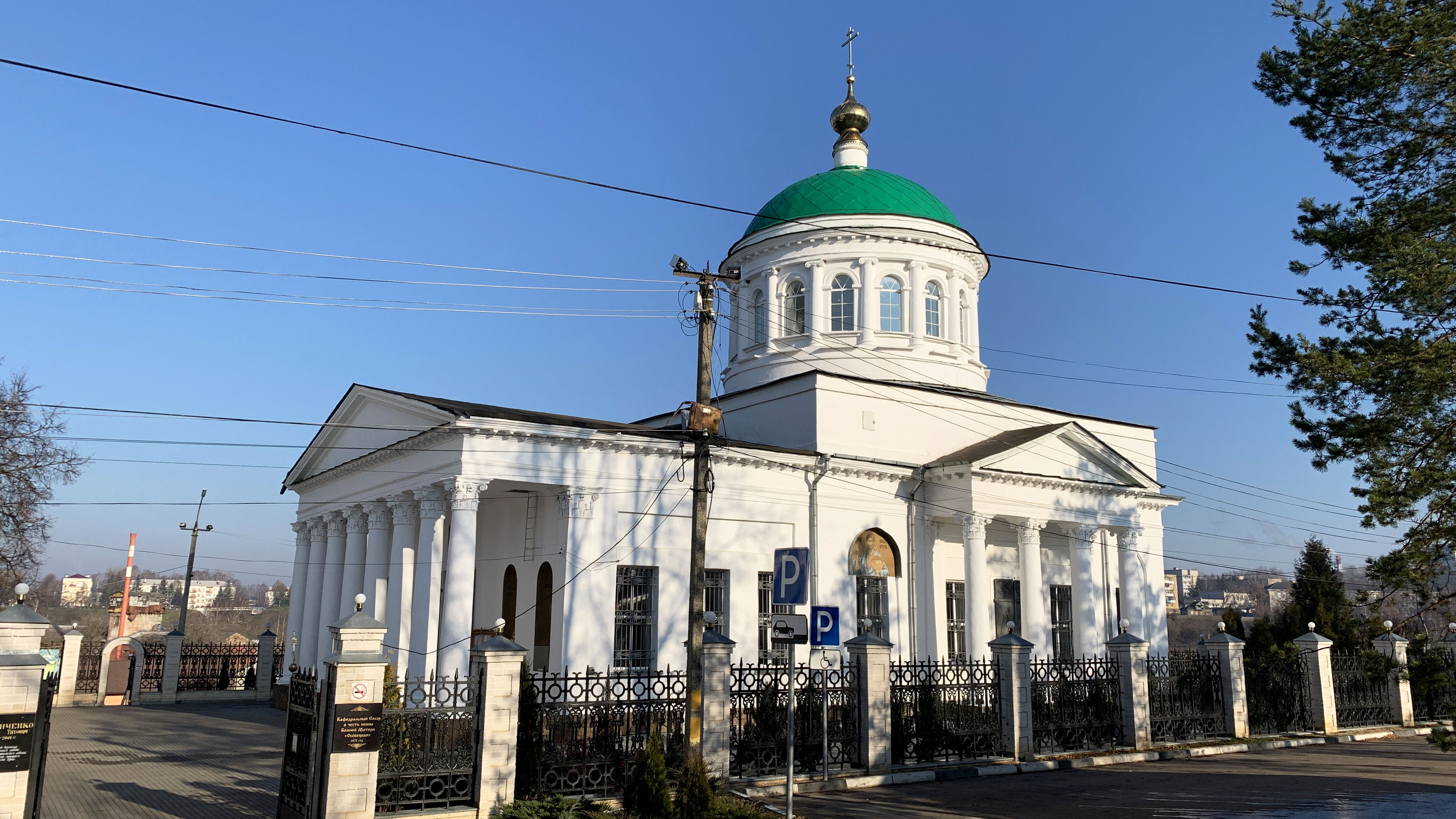
The Okovtsy Church

During World War II, Rzhev was occupied by German troops from 14 October 1941 to 3 March 1943. More than one-sixth of the population was sent off to forced labor in Germany during the Nazi occupation and some nine thousand residents were shot, starved, or tortured to death in a concentration camp set up in the center of town. During this occupation, the general area of Rzhev, Sychyovka and Vyazma was the site of a set of major military operations between the Red Army and Nazi German military forces. These operations, which resulted in a great loss of civilian and military life, are commonly referred to as the Battles of Rzhev and almost completely wiped out the population of the town. Almost no old architecture survived these battles. In honour of the people lost in the war, a statue was unveiled in Rzhev on June 30, 2020. Vladimir Putin and Alexander Lukashenko attended the unveiling, leaving roses at the base of the statue.

== Administrative and municipal status ==
Within the framework of administrative divisions, Rzhev serves as the administrative center of Rzhevsky District, even though it is not a part of it. As an administrative division, it is incorporated separately as Rzhev Okrug—an administrative unit with the status equal to that of the districts. As a municipal division, Rzhev Okrug is incorporated as Rzhev Urban Okrug.

Sklad-40 is a microdistrict on the Soviet side (ru:Советская сторона) western part of the city.

== Economy ==
Rzhev produces most of the cranes used in constructing apartment buildings and shopping malls in Moscow.

=== Transportation ===
The railway which connects Moscow and Riga runs through Rzhev. Another railway connecting Torzhok with Vyazma via Rzhev, crosses it from north to south. There is passenger railway traffic.

The M9 highway connecting Moscow with Riga also passes Rzhev. Two other roads connect Rzhev with Tver via Staritsa and with Ostashkov via Selizharovo. There are also local roads with bus traffic originating from Rzhev.

The Volga is navigable, however, there is no passenger navigation.

== Military ==
The Battles of Rzhev (Russian: Ржевская битва) were a series of Soviet operations in World War II between January 8, 1942, and March 31, 1943. Due to the high losses suffered by the Soviet Army, the campaign became known by veterans and historians as the "Rzhev Meat Grinder" ("Ржевская мясорубка", Rzhevskaya myasorubka). Rzhev was home to the Rzhev and Bakhmutovo air bases during the Cold War. Since 1918 the army base Sklad-40 is located in Rzhev.

== Culture and recreation ==
Rzhev contains 15 cultural heritage monuments of federal significance and additionally 72 objects classified as cultural and historical heritage of local significance. The federal monuments include the Church of John the Baptist (also known as the Okovtsy Church) built in the 19th century, monuments to soldiers and civilians fallen in World War II, as well as a number of archeological sites.

There is a local museum in Rzhev. As a highly controversial move, in 2013 the Joseph-Stalin Museum was opened in a building where Joseph Stalin had spent one night in 1943 while inspecting the troops. As of 2015, the museum did not have regular opening hours and was only open by appointment, trying to keep a low profile.

== International relations ==
=== Twin towns and sister cities ===
Rzhev is twinned with:

- Katrineholm, Sweden
- Salo, Finland
- Kovel, Ukraine
- Silistra, Bulgaria
- Gütersloh, Germany

Former twin towns:

- Legionowo, Poland (terminated due to the 2022 Russian invasion of Ukraine)
