= Rzhevsky District =

Rzhevsky District Ржевский район (Russian)
- District
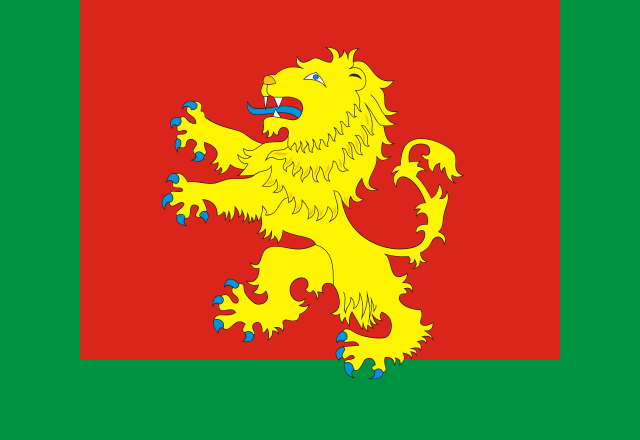
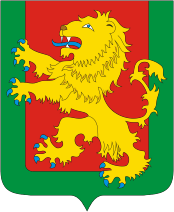
- Flag Coat of arms
- Location of Rzhevsky District in Tver Oblast
- Coordinates: 56°15′56″N 34°19′39″E
- Country: Russia
- Federal subject: Tver Oblast
- Established: 2022
- Administrative center: Rzhev

Area
  - Total: 2,760 km^{2} (1,070 sq mi)

Population (2010 Census)
  - Total: 12,480
  - Estimate (2018): 11,258 (−9.8%)
  - Density: 4.52/km^{2} (11.7/sq mi)
  - Urban: 0%
  - Rural: 100%

Administrative structure
  - Administrative divisions: 7 Rural settlements
  - Inhabited localities: 389 rural localities

Municipal structure
  - Municipally incorporated as: Rzhevsky Municipal District
  - Municipal divisions: 0 urban settlements, 7 rural settlements
- Time zone: UTC+3 (MSK)
- OKTMO ID: 28548000
- Website: http://rzhevregion.com/

Rzhevsky District (Russian: Рже́вский райо́н) is an administrative and municipal district (raion), one of the thirty-six in Tver Oblast, Russia. It is located in the south of the oblast and borders with Staritsky District in the north, Zubtsovsky District in the east, Sychyovsky District of Smolensk Oblast in the south, Oleninsky District in the west, and with Selizharovsky District in the northwest. The area of the district is 2,760 square kilometers (1,070 sq mi). Its administrative center is the town of Rzhev (which is not administratively a part of the district). Population: 12,480 (2010 Census); 14,674 (2002 census); 17,664 (1989 Soviet census).

== Geography ==
The whole area of the district belongs to the drainage basin of the Volga River. The volga itself crosses the district from north to south. The main tributaries of the Volga within the district are the Itomlya River (left), the Tudovka River (right), and the Sishka River (right). The southeastern part of the district belongs to the basin of the Osuga River, a right tributary of the Vazuza, also in the basin of the Volga. The Osuga itself crosses the southern part of the district. Most of the area of the district is forested.

== History ==
Rzhev was founded in the Middle Ages. It belonged to Principality of Smolensk and subsequently to Principality of Toropets. From the 13th century, the area was the battlefield between Vladimir-Suzdal (later the Grand Duchy of Moscow) and the Grand Duchy of Lithuania and changed hands many times. In the 13th century, Principality of Rzhev existed with the capital in Rzhev. In the end of the 14th century, the area was finally under control of Moscow, and in the 15th century, it was briefly given to Principality of Tver (which itself was annexed by Moscow shortly afterwards).

In the course of the administrative reform carried out in 1708 by Peter the Great, the area was included into Ingermanlandia Governorate (since 1710 known as Saint Petersburg Governorate), and in 1727 Novgorod Governorate split off. In 1775, Tver Viceroyalty was formed from the lands which previously belonged to Moscow and Novgorod Governorates, and the area was transferred to Tver Viceroyalty, which in 1796 was transformed to Tver Governorate. In 1775, Rzhevsky Uyezd was established, with the center in Rzhev. Almost the whole area of the district belonged to Rzhevsky Uyezd, with small parts also belonging to Staritsky and Zubtsovsky Uyezds.

On 12 July 1929, governorates and uyezds were abolished, and Rzhevsky District with the administrative center in the town of Rzhev was established. It belonged to Rzhev Okrug of Western Oblast. On August 1, 1930 the okrugs were abolished, and the districts were subordinated directly to the oblast. On 29 January 1935 Kalinin Oblast was established, and Rzhevsky District was transferred to Kalinin Oblast. During World War II, in 1941—1943, the district was occupied by German troops. In 1990, Kalinin Oblast was renamed Tver Oblast.

On 12 July 1929 Molodotudsky District, with the center in the selo of Molodoy Tud was created as well. It was a part of Rzhev Okrug of Western Oblast. On 1 February 1932 it was abolished. On March 5, 1935 Chertolinsky District with the administrative center in the selo of Chertolino was established. It was a part of Kalinin Oblast. On 20 March 1936 Chertolino was transferred to Rzhevsky District, and Chertolinsky District was renamed Molodotudsky. The administrative center was moved to Molodoy Tud. On 22 August 1958 Molodotudsky District was abolished and split between Kirovsky, Oleninsky, and Rzhevsky Districts.

Another district created on 12 July 1929 was Lukovnikovsky District, with the center in the selo of Lukovnikovo. It was a part of Rzhev Okrug of Western Oblast. On January 29, 1935 Lukovnikovsky District was transferred to Kalinin Oblast. On 14 November 1960 Lukovnikovsky District was abolished and split between Kirovsky, Novotorzhsky, Staritsky, and Rzhevsky Districts.

== Administrative and municipal status ==
Within the framework of administrative divisions, Rzhevsky District is one of the thirty-six in the oblast. The town of Rzhev serves as its administrative center, despite being incorporated separately as an okrug—an administrative unit with the status equal to that of the districts.

As a municipal division, the district is incorporated as Rzhevsky Municipal District. Rzhev Okrug is incorporated separately from the district as Rzhev Urban Okrug.

== Economy ==
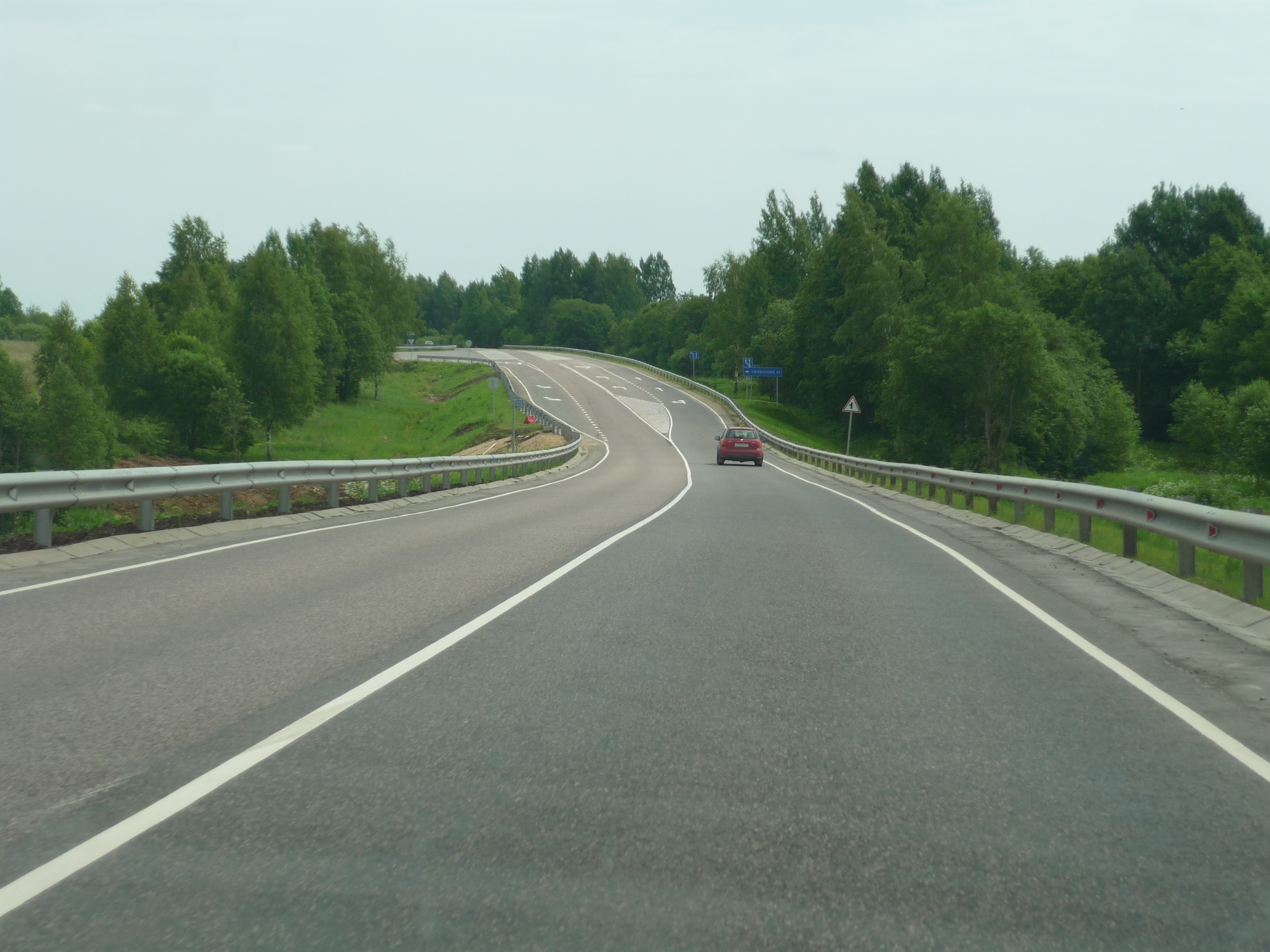
The M9 highway in Rzhevsky District

=== Industry ===
There are enterprises in the district producing brick, crushed stone, and prefabricated wooden houses.

=== Agriculture ===
The main agricultural specializations of the district are cattle breeding with meat and milk production, as well as crops and flax growing.

=== Transportation ===
The railway which connects Moscow and Riga via Rzhev, crosses the district from east to west. Another railway connecting Torzhok with Vyazma via Rzhev, crosses it from north to south. There is passenger railway traffic.

The M9 highway connecting Moscow with Riga also crosses the district. Two other roads connect Rzhev with Tver via Staritsa and with Ostashkov via Selizharovo; both of them cross the district. There are also local roads with bus traffic originating from Rzhev.

The Volga is navigable, however, there is no passenger navigation.

== Culture and recreation ==
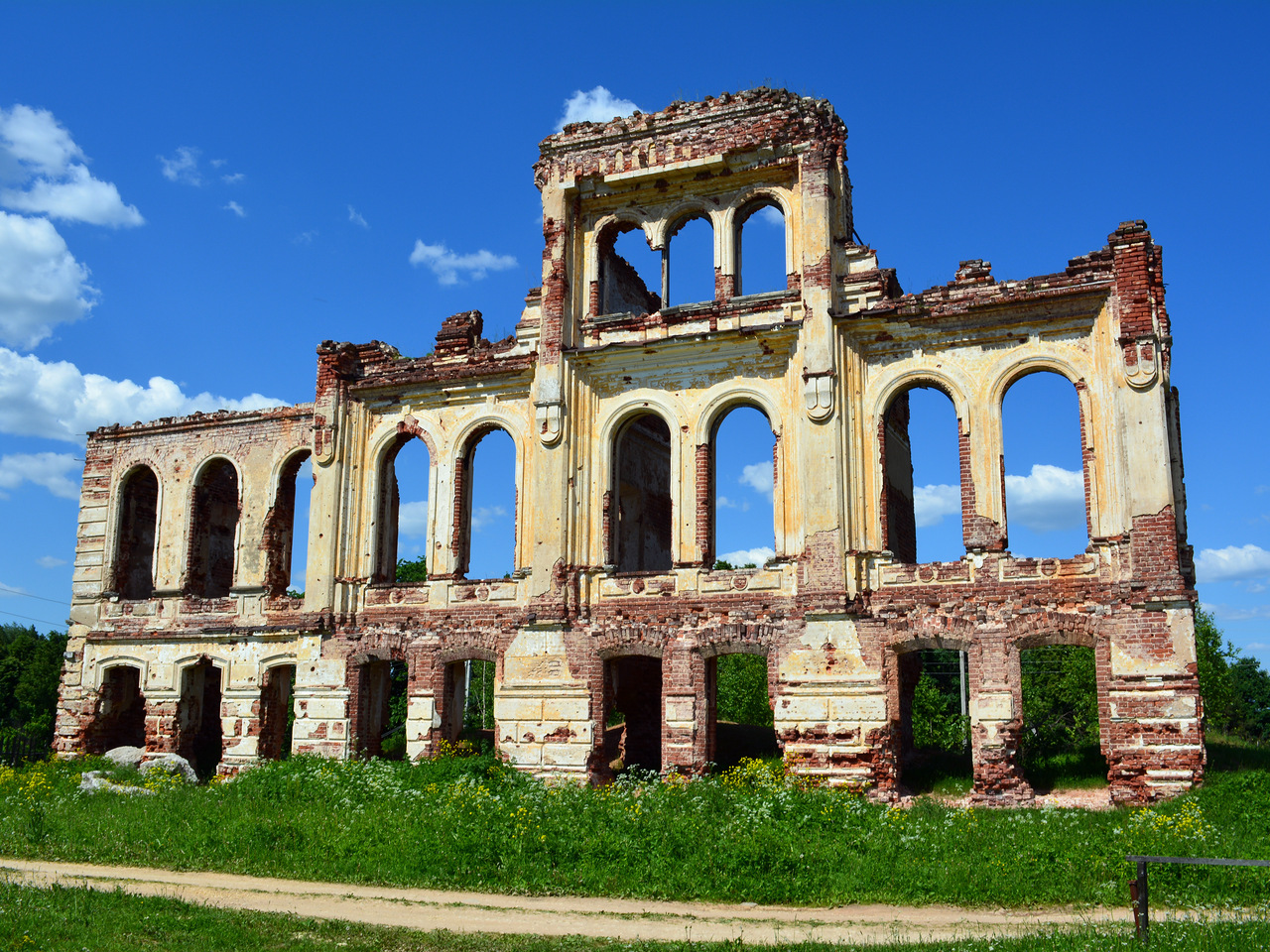
Ruins of the facade of the main building of the Znamenskoye Estate

The district contains 13 cultural heritage monuments of federal significance and additionally 108 objects classified as cultural and historical heritage of local significance. The federal monuments include the Church of the Nativity of the Theotokos in the selo of Ratkovo, the complex of the Orekhovo Estate in the selo of Orekhovo, as well as a number of archeological sites.
