= Zubtsovsky District =

Zubtsovsky District Зубцовский район (Russian)
- District
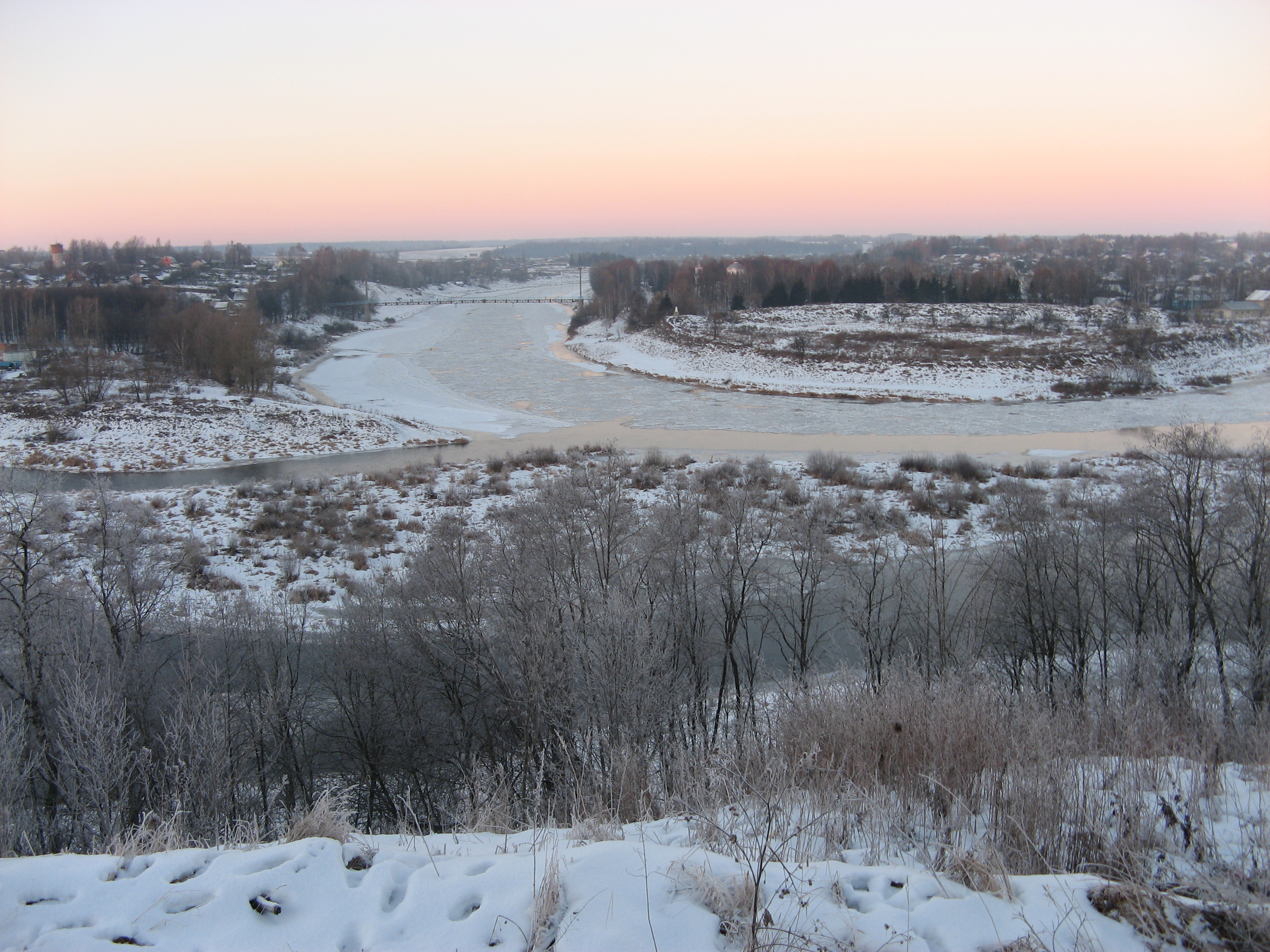
- The Volga and the suspension bridge in Zubtsov

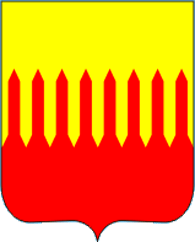
- Flag Coat of arms
- Location of Zubtsovsky District in Tver Oblast
- Coordinates: 56°10′N 34°35′E
- Country: Russia
- Federal subject: Tver Oblast
- Established: 1 October 1929
- Administrative center: Zubtsov

Area
  - Total: 2,166.5 km^{2} (836.5 sq mi)

Population (2010 Census)
  - Total: 17,216
  - Density: 7.9465/km^{2} (20.581/sq mi)
  - Urban: 40.2%
  - Rural: 59.8%

Administrative structure
  - Administrative divisions: 1 Urban settlements, 7 Rural settlements
  - Inhabited localities: 1 cities/towns, 272 rural localities

Municipal structure
  - Municipally incorporated as: Zubtsovsky Municipal District
  - Municipal divisions: 1 urban settlements, 7 rural settlements
- Time zone: UTC+3 (MSK)
- OKTMO ID: 28618000
- Website: http://adminzubcov.ru/

Zubtsovsky District (Russian: Зубцо́вский райо́н) is an administrative and municipal district (raion), one of the thirty-six in Tver Oblast, Russia. It is located in the south of the oblast and borders with Staritsky District in the north, Lotoshinsky District of Moscow Oblast in the northeast, Shakhovskoy District, also of Moscow Oblast, in the east, Gagarinsky District of Smolensk Oblast in the south, Sychyovsky District, also of Smolensk Oblast, in the southwest, and with Rzhevsky District in the west. The area of the district is 2,166.5 square kilometers (836.5 sq mi). Its administrative center is the town of Zubtsov. Population: 17,216 (2010 Census); 19,398 (2002 census); 21,950 (1989 Soviet census). The population of Zubtsov accounts for 40.2% of the district's total population.

== Geography ==
The whole area of the district belongs to the drainage basin of the Volga. The Volga itself crosses the northern part of the district. The biggest tributaries of the Volga within the district are the Derzha and the Vazuza, in the lower course together with a major tributary, the Osuga, built as Vazuza Reservoir. The northeastern part of the district belongs to the drainage basin of the Shosha, a major right tributary of the Volga. The Shosha itself crosses the eastern part of the district. The landscape of the district are primarily smooth hills.

== History ==
Zubtsov was first mentioned in 1216. Due to its location on the Volga, it controlled one of the versions of the Trade route from the Varangians to the Greeks. In the 14th century, the area belonged to Principality of Tver. Between 1318 and 1460, separate Zubtsov Principality existed with the seat in Zubtsov. It was subordinate to Principality of Tver. In 1460, it was abolished and merged back to Principality of Tver. In 1485, the area was included to the Grand Duchy of Moscow.

In the course of the administrative reform carried out in 1708 by Peter the Great, the area was included into Ingermanlandia Governorate (since 1710 known as Saint Petersburg Governorate), and in 1727 Novgorod Governorate split off. In 1775, Tver Viceroyalty was formed from the lands which previously belonged to Moscow and Novgorod Governorates, and the area was transferred to Tver Viceroyalty, which in 1796 was transformed to Tver Governorate. In 1775, Zubtsovsky Uyezd was established, with the center in Zubtsov. The whole area of the district belonged to Zubtsovsky Uyezd. On 30 May 1922, Zubtsovsky Uyezd was abolished and merged into Rzhevsky Uyezd.

On 12 July 1929, governorates and uyezds were abolished, and Zubtsovsky District with the administrative center in the town of Zubtsov was established. It belonged to Rzhev Okrug of Western Oblast. On August 1, 1930 the okrugs were abolished, and the districts were subordinated directly to the oblast. On 29 January 1935 Kalinin Oblast was established, and Zubtsovsky District was transferred to Kalinin Oblast. During World War II, in 1941—1943, the district was occupied by German troops. In February 1963, during the abortive administrative reform by Nikita Khrushchev, Zubtsovsky District was merged into Rzhevsky District, but on 12 January 1965 it was re-established. In 1990, Kalinin Oblast was renamed Tver Oblast.

On 12 July 1929 Pogorelsky District, with the center in the selo of Pogoreloye Gorodishche was created as well. It was a part of Rzhev Okrug of Moscow Oblast. In 1934, the district was abolished. On 10 February 1935 Pogorelsky District was re-established and transferred to Kalinin Oblast. On 14 November 1960 Pogorelsky District was abolished and merged into Zubtsovsky District.

== Economy ==
=== Industry ===
There are enterprises of timber industry and of metallurgy in the district.

=== Agriculture ===
The main agricultural specializations of the district are cattle breeding with meat and milk production, and crops growing.

=== Transportation ===
The railroad which connects Moscow and Riga via Rzhev, crosses the district from east to west. The principal stations within the district are Zubtsov and Knyazhyi Gory.

The M9 highway connecting Moscow with Riga also crosses the district passing Zubtsov. Another road to Gagarin branches off south. There are also local roads with bus traffic originating from Zubtsov.

The Volga is navigable, however, there is no passenger navigation.

There is a small Orlovka Airfield (ICAO: UUTO) near Zubtsov.

== Culture and recreation ==
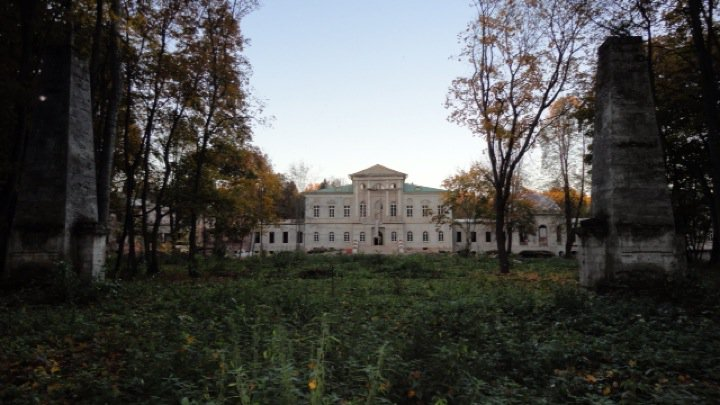
The main building of the Stepanovskoye Estate

The district contains 17 cultural heritage monuments of federal significance (4 of them in Zubtsov) and additionally 103 objects classified as cultural and historical heritage of local significance (22 of them in Zubtsov). The federal monuments include the Dormition Cathedral in Zubtsov, the complex of the Stepanovskoye Estate in the selo of Volosovo, as well as a number of archeological sites and of monuments related to World War II.

The Zubtsov District Museum, open in 1988 and located in Zubtsov, exhibits collections of local interest, including historical and archeological collections.
