= Staritsky District =

Staritsky District Старицкий район (Russian)
- District
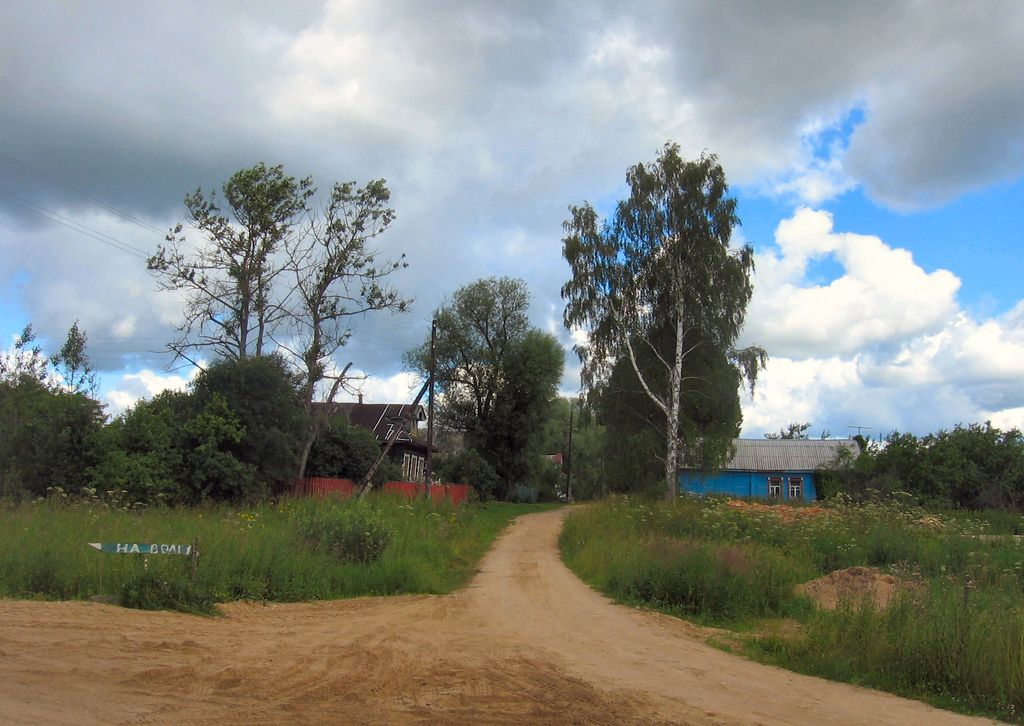
- Kaloshino

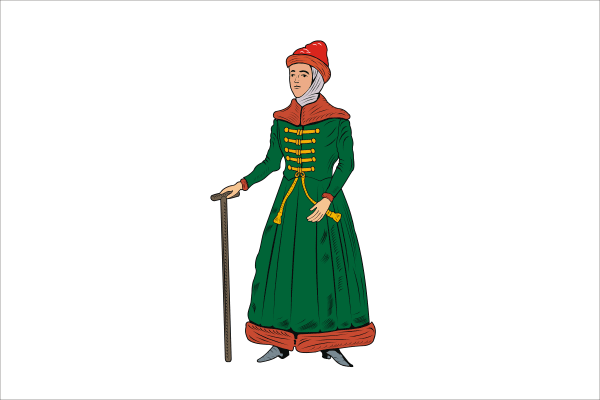
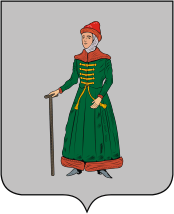
- Flag Coat of arms
- Location of Staritsky District in Tver Oblast
- Coordinates: 56°31′N 34°56′E
- Country: Russia
- Federal subject: Tver Oblast
- Established: 1929
- Administrative center: Staritsa

Area
  - Total: 3,005 km^{2} (1,160 sq mi)

Population (2010 Census)
  - Total: 24,056
  - Density: 8.005/km^{2} (20.73/sq mi)
  - Urban: 35.8%
  - Rural: 64.2%

Administrative structure
  - Administrative divisions: 1 Urban settlements, 8 Rural settlements
  - Inhabited localities: 1 cities/towns, 416 rural localities

Municipal structure
  - Municipally incorporated as: Staritsky Municipal District
  - Municipal divisions: 1 urban settlements, 8 rural settlements
- Time zone: UTC+3 (MSK)
- OKTMO ID: 28653000
- Website: http://старицкий-район.рф/

Staritsky District (Russian: Ста́рицкий райо́н) is an administrative and municipal district (raion), one of the thirty-six in Tver Oblast, Russia. It is located in the central and southern parts of the oblast and borders with Kuvshinovsky District in the north, Torzhoksky District in the northeast, Kalininsky District in the east, Lotoshinsky District of Moscow Oblast in the southeast, Zubtsovsky District in the south, Rzhevsky District in the southwest, and with Selizharovsky District in the west. The area of the district is 3,005 square kilometers (1,160 sq mi). Its administrative center is the town of Staritsa. Population: 24,056 (2010 Census); 25,765 (2002 census); 28,764 (1989 Soviet census). The population of Staritsa accounts for 35.8% of the district's total population.

== Geography ==
The whole area of the district belongs to the drainage basin of the Volga River. The Volga itself crosses the district from southwest to northeast, and the town of Staritsa is located on its banks. Rivers in the southeast of the district drain into the Shosha, a major right tributary of the Volga. A short stretch of the Shosha crosses the southwestern corner of the district. More than 50% of the area of the district is forested.

== History ==
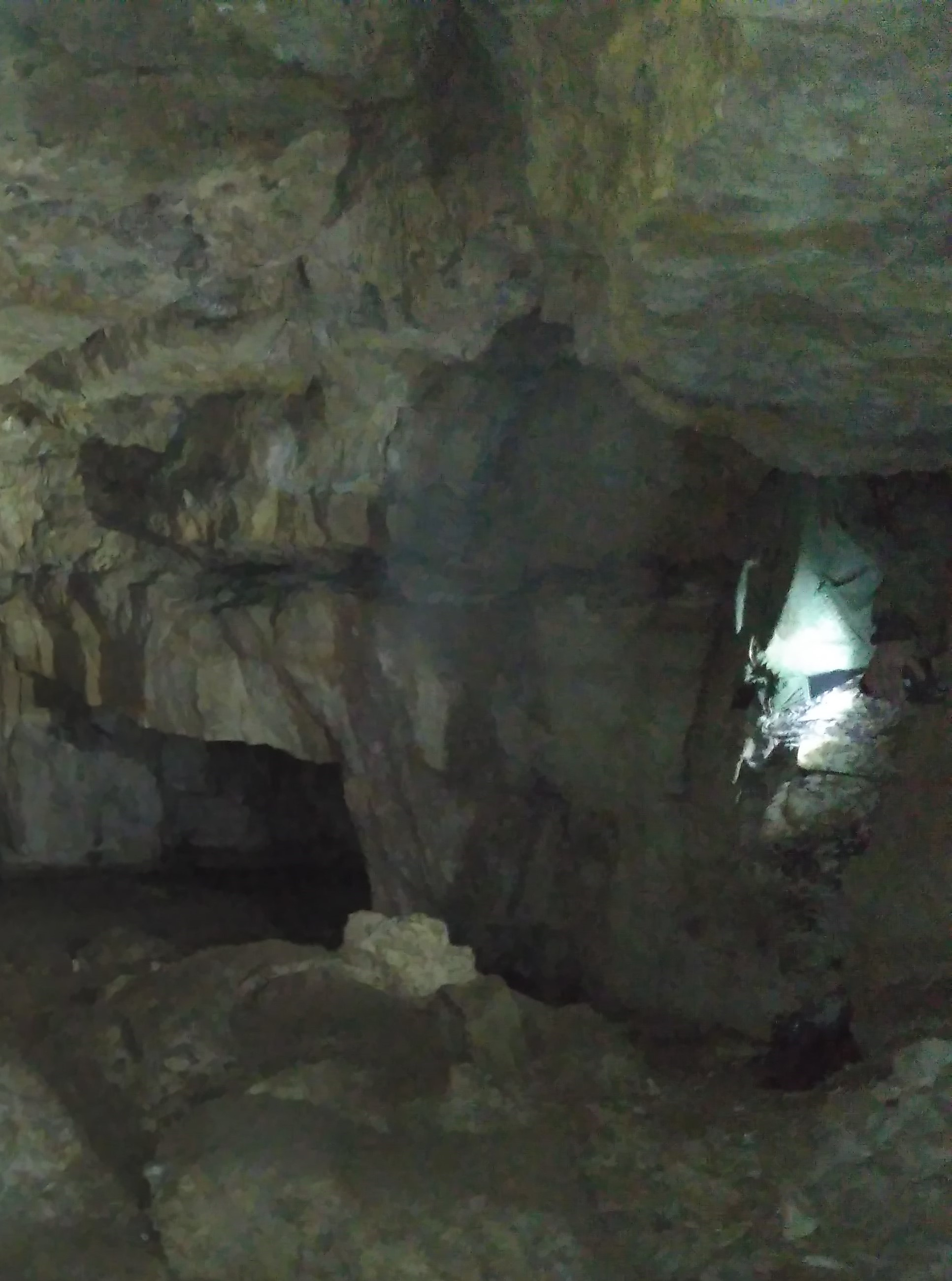
Limestone quarried neat Staritsa was used for construction in many places across Russia

Staritsa was founded by Prince Mikhail of Tver in 1297 as Novy Gorod (known as Staritsa since the 14th century). At the time, the area belonged to Principality of Tver. In the 14th century, it belonged to Principality of Zubtsov, which was eventually merged back into Principlality of Tver. In 1485 it was formally annexed by the Grand Duchy of Moscow. Between 1519 and 1597 Principality of Staritsa, subordinate to Moscow, existed with the capital in Staritsa.

Limestone (called Staritsa marble) was mined in quarries near Staritsa starting from the 13th century.

In the course of the administrative reform carried out in 1708 by Peter the Great, the area was included into Ingermanlandia Governorate (since 1710 known as Saint Petersburg Governorate), and in 1727 Novgorod Governorate split off. In 1775, Tver Viceroyalty was formed from the lands which previously belonged to Moscow and Novgorod Governorates, and the area was transferred to Tver Viceroyalty, which in 1796 was transformed to Tver Governorate. In 1775, Staritsky Uyezd was established, with the center in Staritsa. Much of the area of the district belonged to Staritsky Uyezd. The southern part of the District belonged to Zubtsovsky Uyezd, also established in 1775. On 3 March 1924, Staritsky Uyezd was abolished and split between Novotorzhsky, Rzhevsky, and Tverskoy Uyezds.

On 12 July 1929, governorates and uyezds were abolished, and Staritsky District with the administrative center in the town of Staritsa was established. It belonged to Rzhev Okrug of Western Oblast. On August 1, 1930 the okrugs were abolished, and the districts were subordinated directly to the oblast. On 29 January 1935 Kalinin Oblast was established, and Staritsky District was transferred to Kalinin Oblast. During World War II, in 1941—1942, a considerable part of the district, including Staritsa, was occupied by German troops. In 1990, Kalinin Oblast was renamed Tver Oblast.

On 12 July 1929 Yemelyanovsky District, with the center in the selo of Yemelyanovo was created as well. It was a part of Tver Okrug of Moscow Oblast. On 29 January 1935 Yemelyanovsky District was transferred to Kalinin Oblast. On 4 July 1956 Yemelyanovsky District was abolished and split between Kalininsky, Staritsky, Turginovsky, and Vysokovsky Districts.

Another district created on 12 July 1929 was Lukovnikovsky District, with the center in the selo of Lukovnikovo. It was a part of Rzhev Okrug of Western Oblast. On 29 January 1935 Lukovnikovsky District was transferred to Kalinin Oblast. On 14 November 1960 Lukovnikovsky District was abolished and split between Kirovsky, Novotorzhsky, Staritsky, and Rzhevsky Districts.

On 12 July 1929 Vysokovsky District, with the center in the settlement of Vysokoye was created as well. It was a part of Rzhev Okrug of Western Oblast. In 1930, it was abolished. On 1 June 1936, the district was re-established. On 13 February 1963 Vysokovsky District was abolished and merged into Staritsky District. Later, its northern part was transferred to Torzhoksky District.

== Economy ==
=== Industry ===
The two biggest enterprises of the district are located in Staritsa. One produces hydraulic devices for aviation industry, another one performs heat treatment of metal.

=== Agriculture ===
The main agricultural specialization of the district is cattle breeding with meat and milk production.

=== Transportation ===
A railway connecting Torzhok and Rzhev crosses the district from northeast to southwest. The biggest station within the district is Staritsa railway station, located about a dozen kilometers northeast of the town of Staritsa.

A paved road connecting Tver to Rzhev crosses the district and passes through Staritsa, where there is a bridge over the Volga. Another road connects Staritsa with Torzhok via Bernovo. There are also local roads with bus traffic originating from Staritsa.

The Volga is navigable but there is no passenger navigation.

== Culture and recreation ==
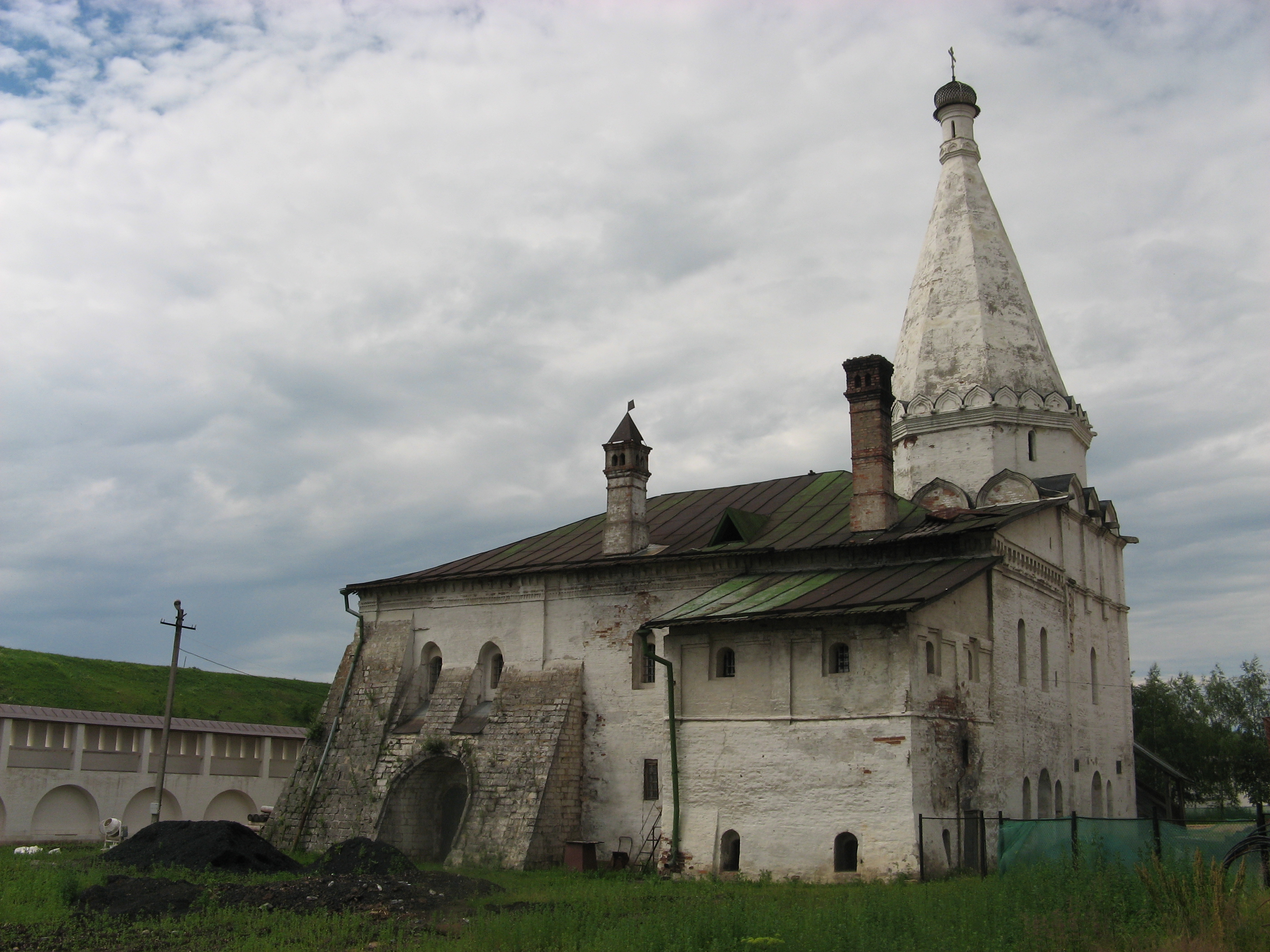
Church of the Entry of the Theotokos into the Temple, Staritsa

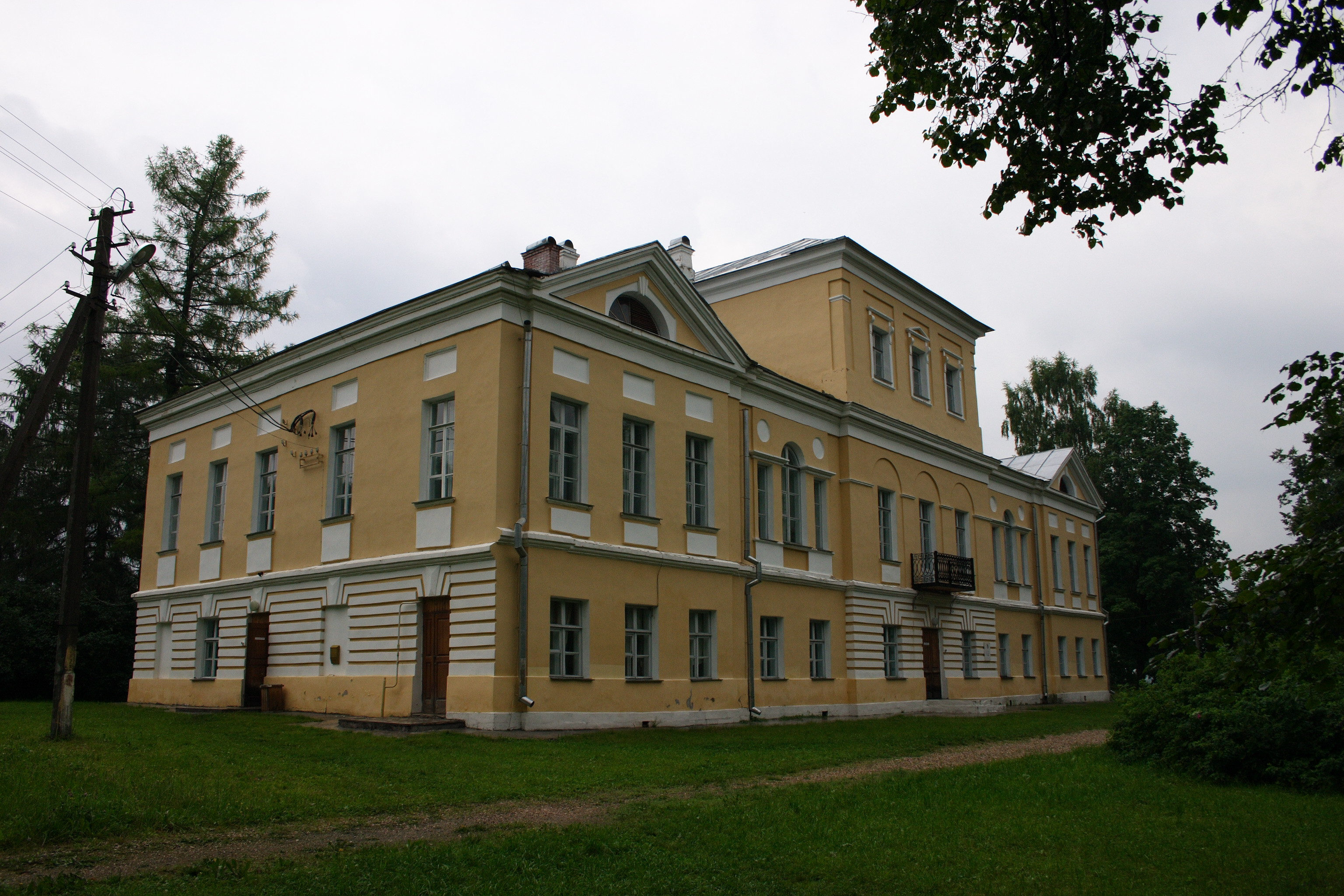
The main building of the Bernovo Estate

The district contains 95 cultural heritage monuments of federal significance (37 of them in Staritsa) and additionally 346 objects classified as cultural and historical heritage of local significance (121 of them in Staritsa). The federal monuments include, in particular, the ensemble of the center of the town of Staritsa (with Dormition Monastery), the Bernovo Estate in the village of Bernovo, the Transfiguration Church and the Krasnoye Estate in the village of Krasnoye, the Bratkovo-Ivanovskoye Estate in the selo of Ivanovskoye, the Pervitino Estate in the selo of Pervitino, the Chukavino Estate in the selo of Chukavino, as well as the several archeological sites.

There are three museums in the district. In the town of Staritsa, the Staritsa District museum concentrates on the history of the area. In Bernovo, the Alexander Pushkin Museum is open. Alexander Pushkin, a Russian poet considered to be a creator of the modern Russian language, visited the Bernovo Estate owned by his friends on several occasions. In the village of Ryasnya, where in a nearby estate the vice-admiral Vladimir Kornilov was born, a memorial museum was opened.
