= Vazuza =

Vazuza River
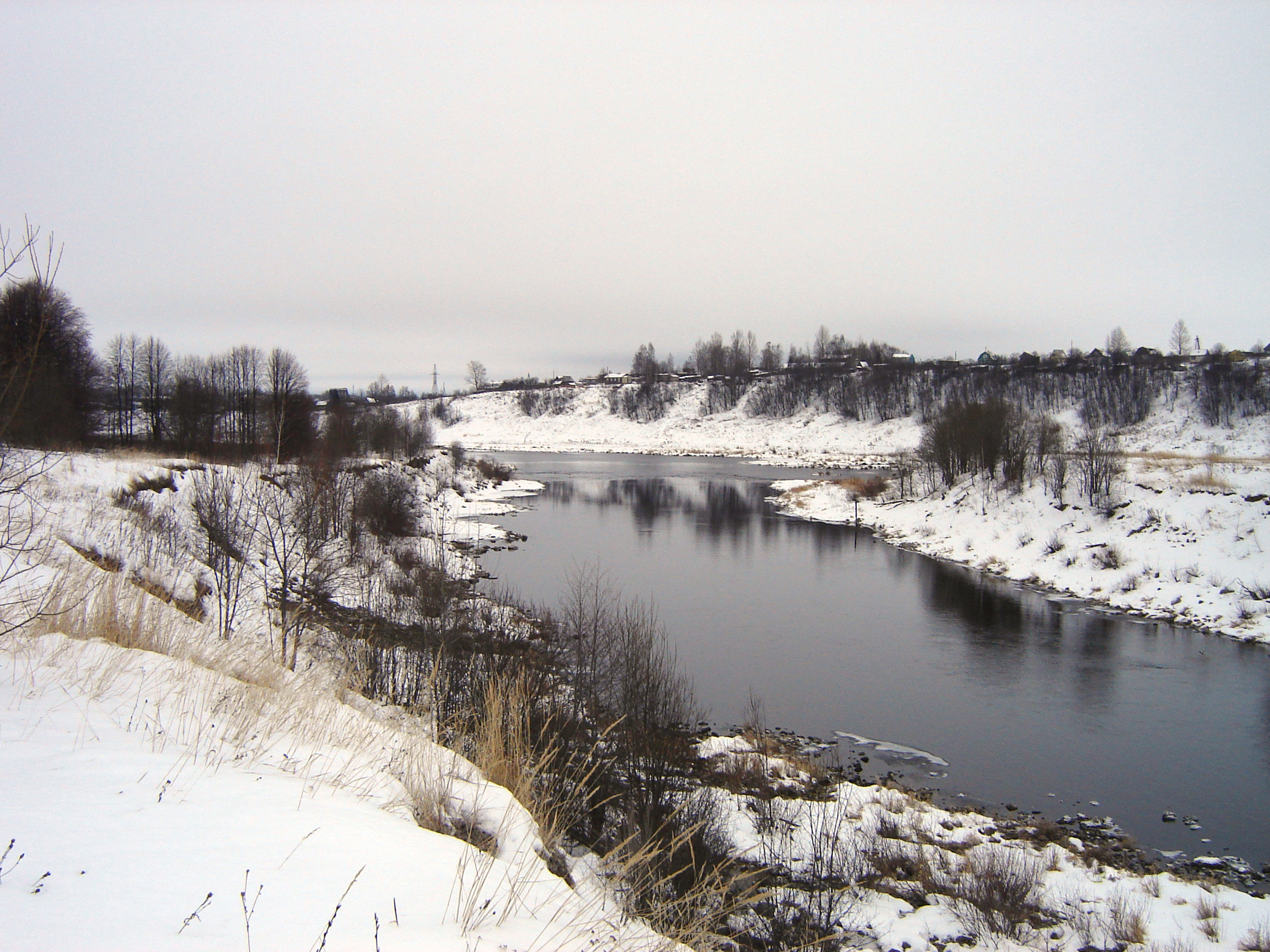
- The Vazuza near Zubtsov
- Native name: Вазуза (Russian)

Location
- Country: Russia

Physical characteristics
- Mouth: Volga
  - coordinates: 56.1681°N 34.5908°E
- Length: 162 km (101 mi)
- Basin size: 7,120 km^{2} (2,750 sq mi)

Basin features
- Progression: Volga→ Caspian Sea

The Vazuza (Russian: Вазу́за), a river in the Novoduginsky and Sychyovsky districts of Smolensk Oblast and in the Zubtsovsky District of Tver Oblast, Russia, becomes a right tributary of the Volga. It is 162 kilometres (101 mi) long, and its drainage basin covers 7,120 square kilometres (2,750 mi^{2}). Soviet engineers flooded the lower part of the river to form the Vazuza Reservoir. The towns of Sychyovka and Zubtsov are located on the banks the Vazuza (the latter at its confluence with the Volga). The main tributaries of the Vazuza are the Kasnya, the Gzhat (both right), the Losmina and the Osuga (left).

The source of the Vazuza is located east of the village of Lukino in Novoduginsky District. The river flows north, crosses into Sychyovsky District, and downstream of the town of Sychyovka turns east. Several kilometers downstream from Sychyovka the reservoir begins, and all major tributaries of the Vazuza form bays in the reservoir. The Vazuza accepts the Kasnya from the right and turns northeast. Downstream of the mouth of the Gzhat it makes a short stretch of the border between Tver and Smolensk Oblasts, flowing northwest, and further downstream turns northeast and deviates from the border into Tver Oblast. The dam of the reservoirs is located several kilometers upstream from the mouth of the Vazuza and several kilometers downstream from the mouth of the Osuga.

The drainage basin of the Vazuza includes the major part of Sychyovsky District, the eastern part of Novoduginsky District, the northern parts of Gagarinsky and Vyazemsky Districts of Smolensk Oblast, as well as the southern parts of Zubtsovsky and Rzhevsky Districts and minor areas in the eastern part of Oleninsky District in Tver Oblast. The towns of Zubtsov, Sychyovka, and Gagarin, as well as the selo of Novodugino, the administrative center of Novoduginsky District, are all located in the drainage basin of the Vazuza.

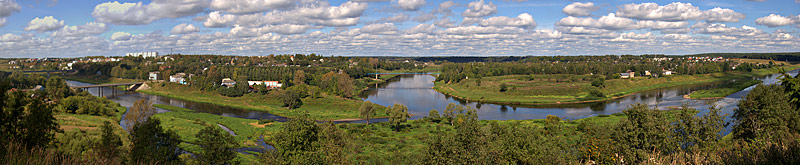
Confluence of the Vazuza (left) with the Volga (right)
