= Zubtsov =

Town in Tver Oblast, Russia

Zubtsov Зубцов
- Town
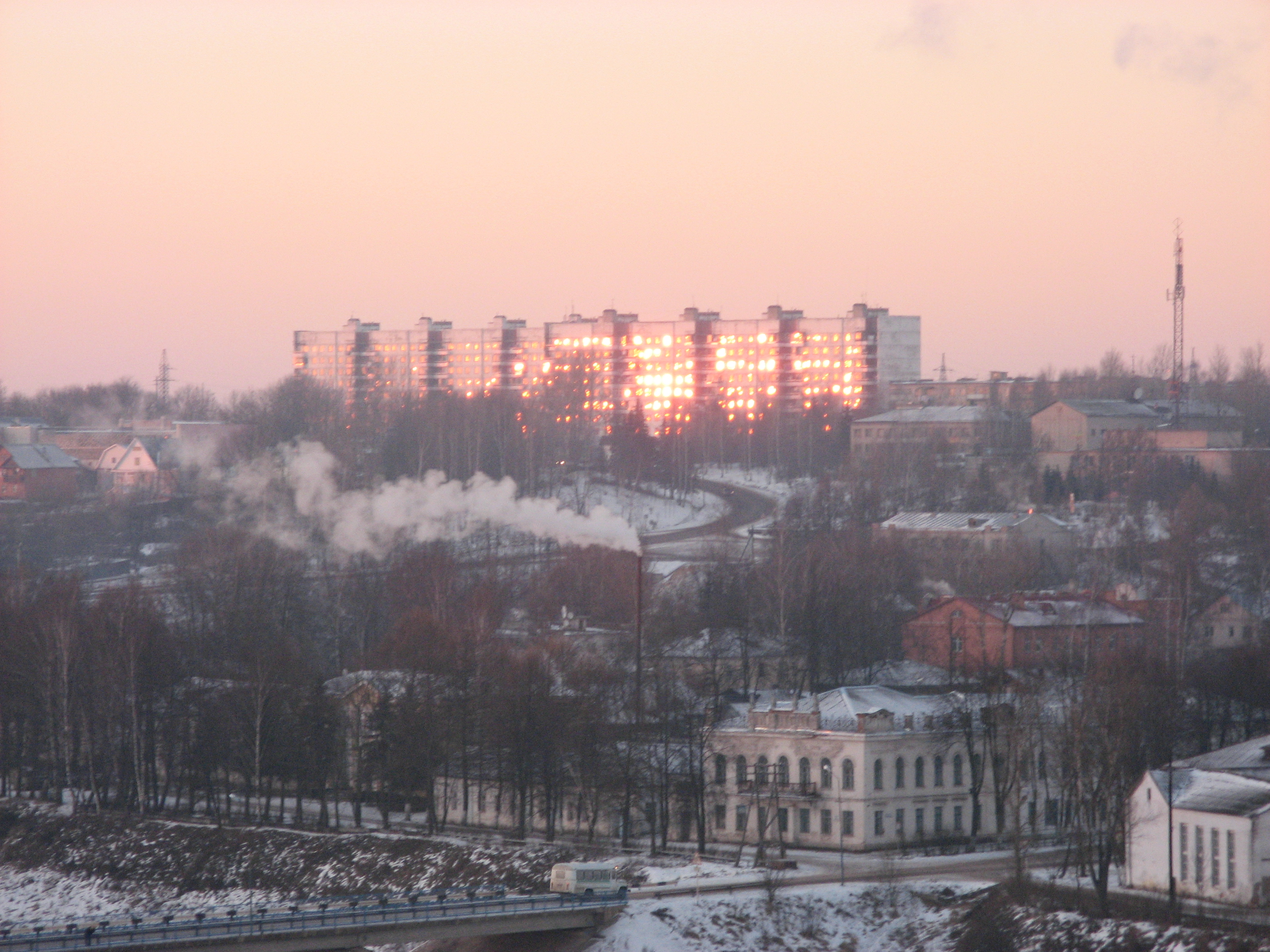
- Zubtsov in winter

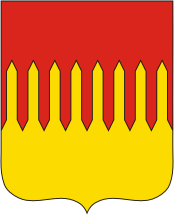
- Flag Coat of arms
- Interactive map of Zubtsov
- Location of Zubtsov Zubtsov (Tver Oblast)
- Coordinates: 56°11′N 34°37′E
- Country: Russia
- Federal subject: Tver Oblast
- Administrative district: Zubtsovsky District
- Urban settlementSelsoviet: Zubtsov
- First mentioned: 1216
- Elevation: 170 m (560 ft)

Population (2010 Census)
  - Total: 6,927
  - Estimate (2021): 6,217 (−10.2%)

Administrative status
  - Capital of: Zubtsovsky District, Zubtsov Urban Settlement

Municipal status
  - Municipal district: Zubtsovsky Municipal District
  - Urban settlement: Zubtsov Urban Settlement
  - Capital of: Zubtsovsky Municipal District, Zubtsov Urban Settlement
- Time zone: UTC+3 (MSK)
- Postal codes: 172332, 172333
- OKTMO ID: 28618101001
- Website: www.gorod-zubcov.ru

Zubtsov (Russian: Зубцо́в) is a town and the administrative center of Zubtsovsky District in Tver Oblast, Russia, located at the confluence of the Volga and Vazuza Rivers, 153 kilometers (95 mi) south of Tver, the administrative center of the oblast. Population: 6,927 (2010 census); 7,430 (2002 census); 7,630 (1989 Soviet census); 8,100 (1998 est.).

== History ==
Zubtsov was first mentioned in a chronicle in 1216. Due to its location on the Volga, it controlled one of the versions of the Trade route from the Varangians to the Greeks. In the Middle Ages, it was a border fortress of Principality of Tver. Between 1318 and 1460, separate Zubtsov Principality existed with the seat in Zubtsov. It was subordinate to the Tver principality. In 1460, it was abolished and merged back to Principality of Tver. The Grand Duchy of Moscow annexed it with the rest of Principality of Tver in 1485. Subsequently, the town was important chiefly as a flax trade market. Its Neoclassical cathedral was constructed in 1801.

In the course of the administrative reform carried out in 1708 by Peter the Great, Zubtsov was included into Ingermanlandia Governorate (since 1710 known as Saint Petersburg Governorate), and in 1727 Novgorod Governorate split off. In 1775, Tver Viceroyalty was formed from the lands which previously belonged to Moscow and Novgorod Governorates, and the area was transferred to Tver Viceroyalty, which in 1796 was transformed to Tver Governorate. In 1775, Zubtsovsky Uyezd was established, with the center in Zubtsov. On 30 May 1922, Zubtsovsky Uyezd was abolished and merged into Rzhevsky Uyezd.

On 12 July 1929, governorates and uyezds were abolished, and Zubtsovsky District with the administrative center in Zubtsov was established. It belonged to Rzhev Okrug of Western Oblast. On August 1, 1930, the okrugs were abolished, and the districts were subordinated directly to the oblast. On 29 January 1935 Kalinin Oblast was established, and Zubtsovsky District was transferred to Kalinin Oblast.

During World War II, the town was occupied by German troops from October 11, 1941 to August 23, 1942 and almost razed to the ground. It was a place of fierce fighting of the Battle of Rzhev. About 15,000 of Red Army soldiers are buried at the Zubtsov's memorial. The town was revitalized after the Vazuza Reservoir project was started in the 1970s. The reservoir currently provides Moscow with one quarter of its drinking water.

In February 1963, during the abortive administrative reform by Nikita Khrushchev, Zubtsovsky District was merged into Rzhevsky District, but on 12 January 1965 it was re-established. In 1990, Kalinin Oblast was renamed Tver Oblast.

== Administrative and municipal status ==
Within the framework of administrative divisions, Zubtsov serves as the administrative center of Zubtsovsky District. As an administrative division, it is incorporated within Zubtsovsky District as Zubtsov Urban Settlement. As a municipal division, this administrative unit also has urban settlement status and is a part of Zubtsovsky Municipal District.

== Economy ==
=== Industry ===
There are enterprises of timber industry and of metallurgy in Zubtsov.

=== Transportation ===
The railroad which connects Moscow and Riga via Rzhev, runs through Zubtsov.

The M9 highway connecting Moscow with Riga also passes Zobtsov. Another road to Gagarin branches off south. There are also local roads with bus traffic originating from Zubtsov.

The Volga is navigable, however, there is no passenger navigation.

== Culture and recreation ==
Zubtsov contains four cultural heritage monuments of federal significance and additionally twenty-two objects classified as cultural and historical heritage of local significance. The federal monuments include the Dormition Cathedral, as well as an archeological site and two monuments related to World War II.

The Zubtsov District Museum, open in 1988 and located in Zubtsov, exhibits collections of local interest, including historical and archeological collections.

== Gallery ==
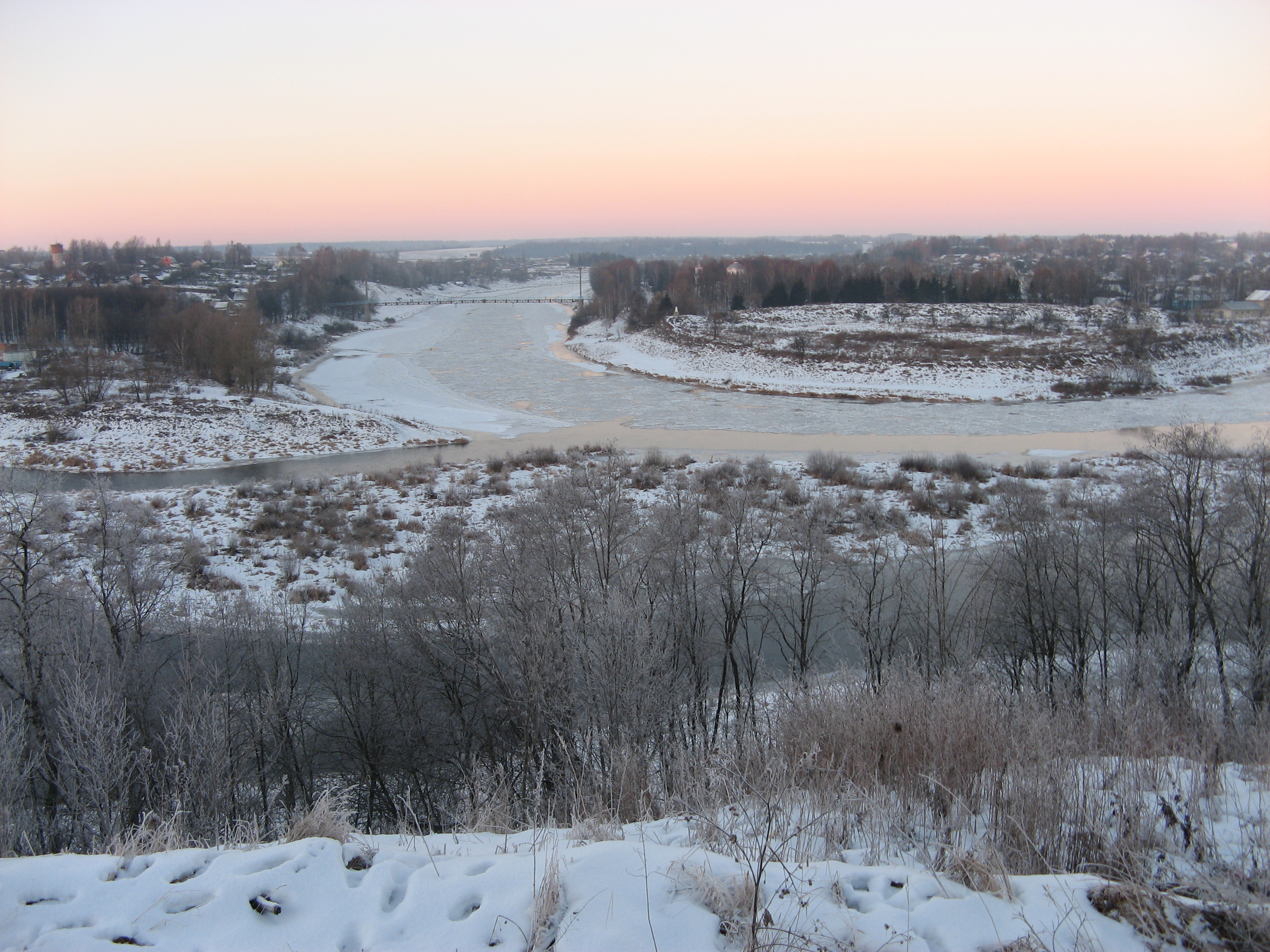
The Volga in Zubtsov, Tver Oblast

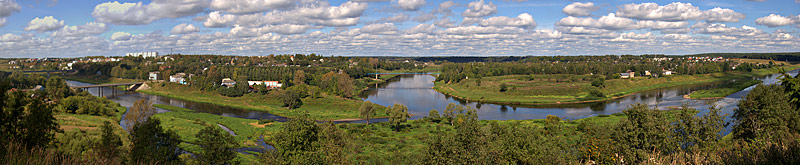
The Volga in Zubtsov, Tver Oblast

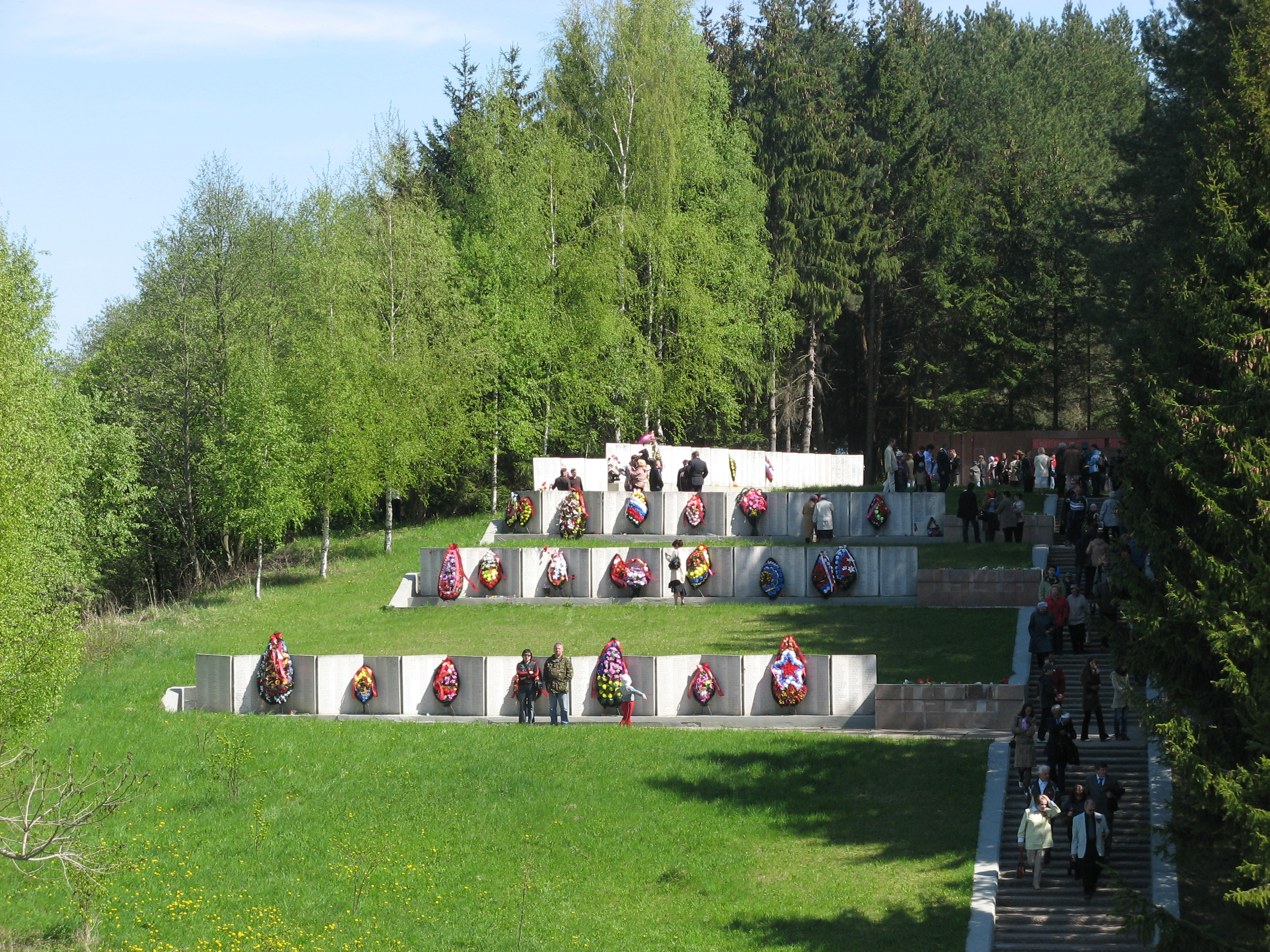
The World War II Memorial

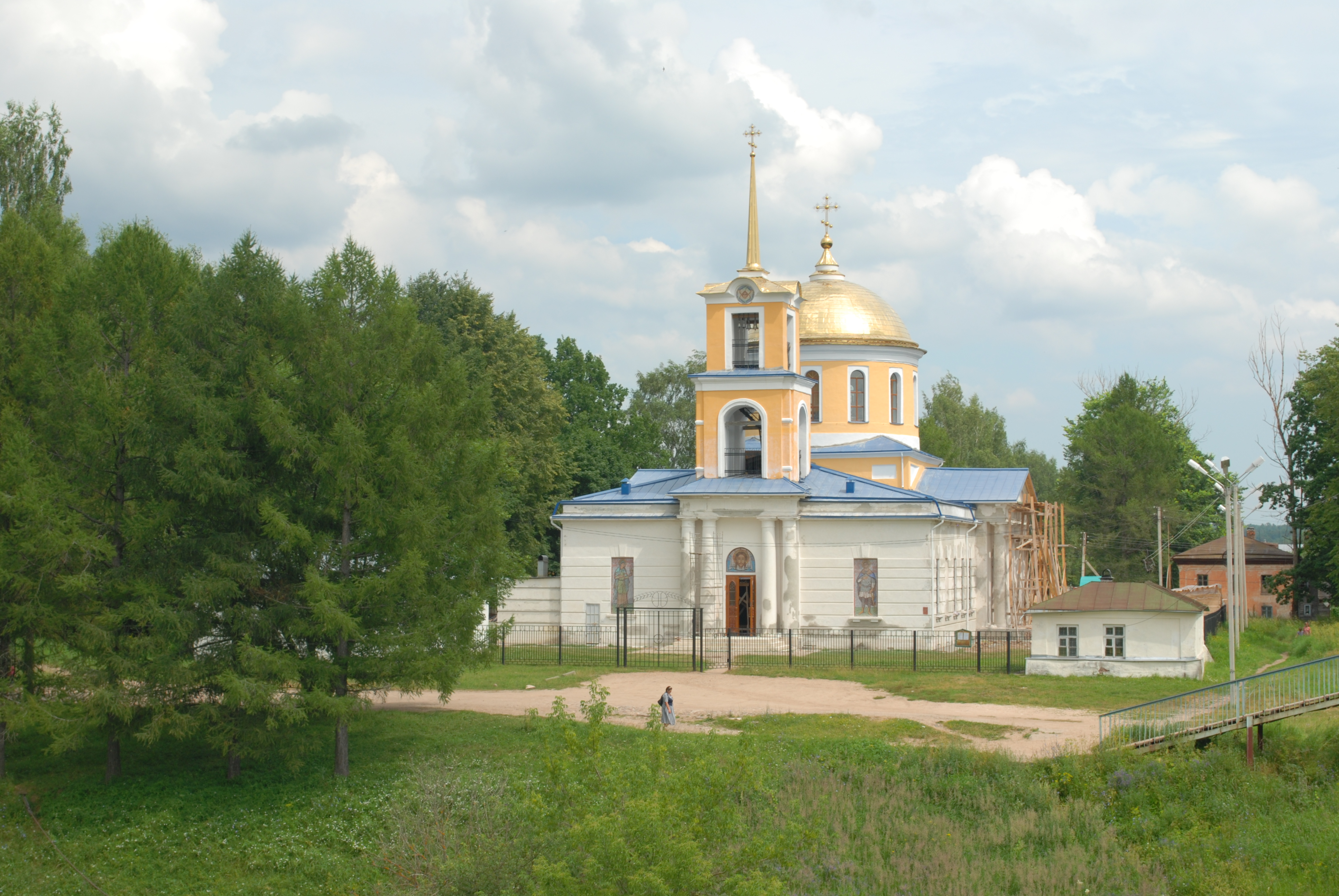
The Dormition Cathedral
