= Zubtsovsky =

Zubtsovsky (masculine), Zubtsovskaya (feminine), or Zubtsovskoye (neuter) may refer to:

- Zubtsovsky District, a district of Tver Oblast, Russia
- Zubtsovskaya, a rural locality (a village) in Arkhangelsk Oblast, Russia

== See also ==
- Zubtsov
