= Staritsa (town), Tver Oblast =

Town in Tver Oblast, Russia

Staritsa Старица
- Town
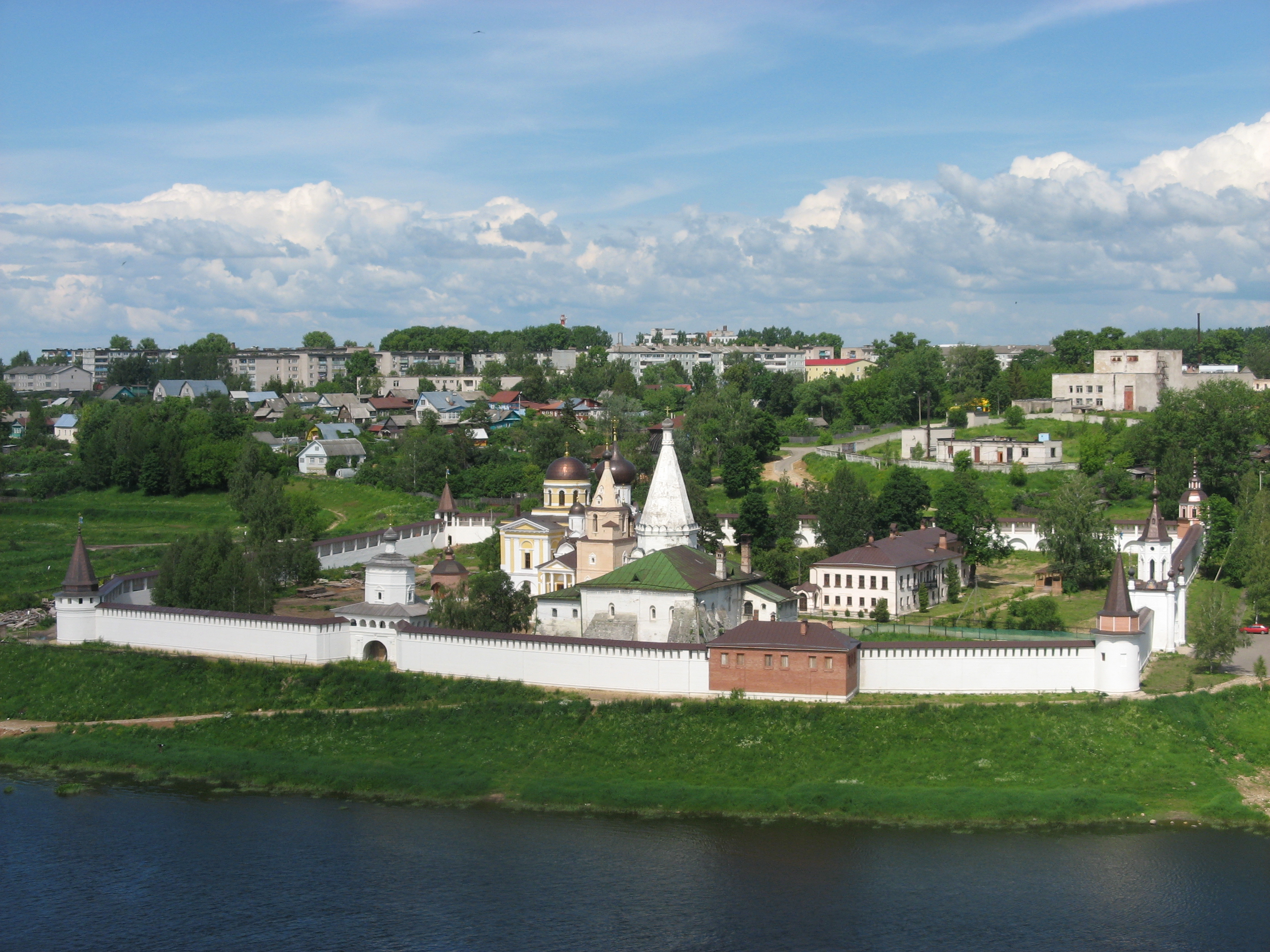
- View of Staritsa, June 2008

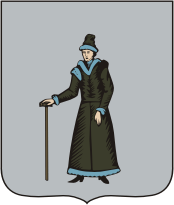
- Coat of arms
- Interactive map of Staritsa
- Location of Staritsa Staritsa (Tver Oblast)
- Coordinates: 56°30′N 34°57′E
- Country: Russia
- Federal subject: Tver Oblast
- Administrative district: Staritsky District
- Urban settlementSelsoviet: Staritsa
- Founded: 1297
- Elevation: 175 m (574 ft)

Population (2010 Census)
  - Total: 8,607
  - Estimate (2021): 6,938 (−19.4%)

Administrative status
  - Capital of: Staritsky District, Staritsa Urban Settlement

Municipal status
  - Municipal district: Staritsky Municipal District
  - Urban settlement: Staritsa Urban Settlement
  - Capital of: Staritsky Municipal District, Staritsa Urban Settlement
- Time zone: UTC+3 (MSK)
- Postal codes: 171360, 171361, 171399
- OKTMO ID: 28653101001

Staritsa (Russian: Ста́рица) is a town and the administrative center of Staritsky District in Tver Oblast, Russia, located on the Volga River, 77 kilometers (48 mi) from Tver, the administrative center of the oblast. Population: 8,607 (2010 census); 9,125 (2002 census); 9,120 (1989 Soviet census).

It was previously known as Gorodok (until the 15th century).

== History ==
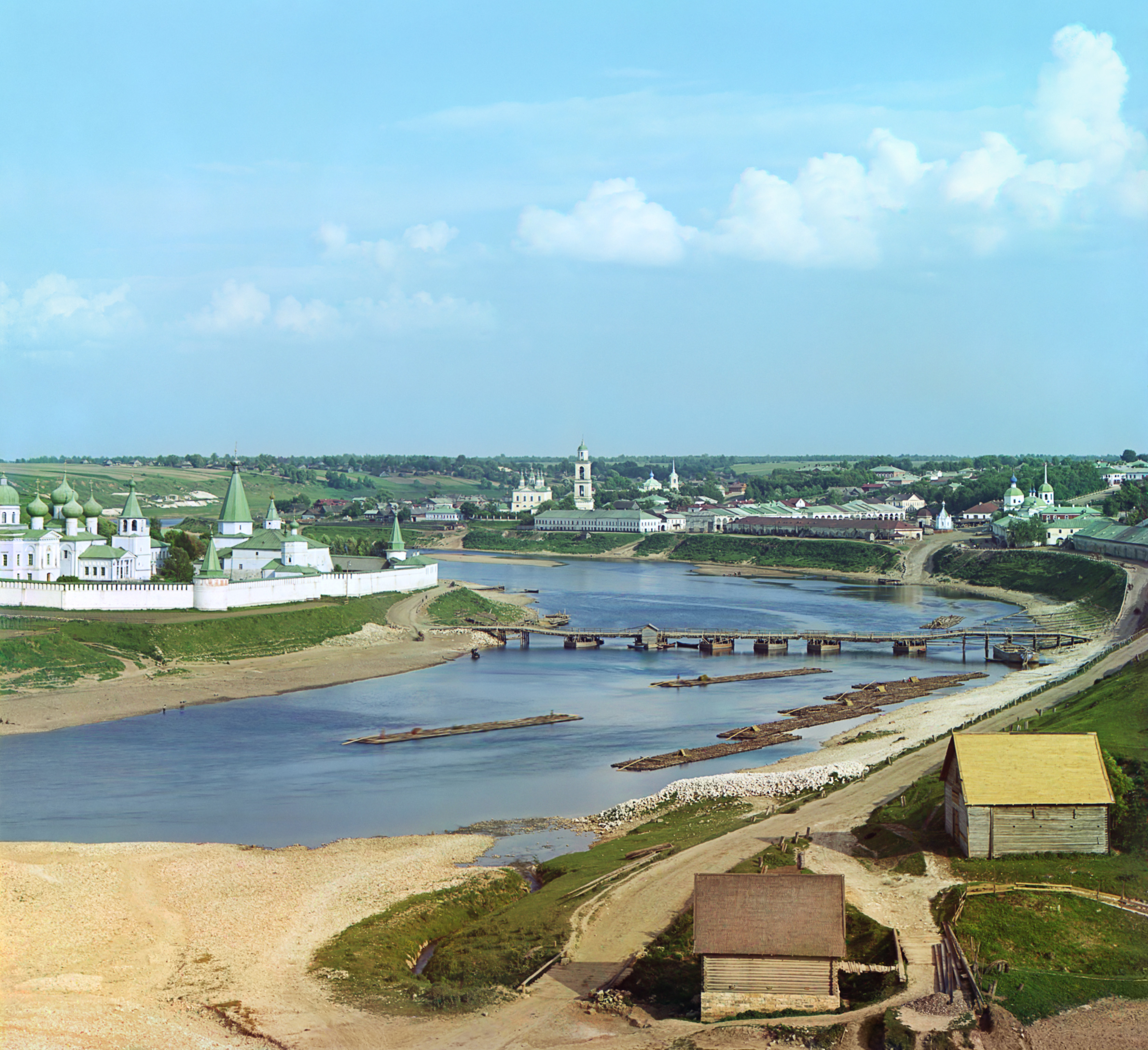
View of Staritsa in 1912

The town was established in 1297 under the name of Gorodok (Городо́к), lit. small town). In 1365, it was moved from the more elevated right to the lower left bank of the Volga River. Since the 15th century, the town has been called Staritsa (lit. former river-bed). The name was misinterpreted by heraldists who represented on Staritsa's coat of arms an image of aged nun, which is another meaning of the Russian word "staritsa". In the 14th century, it belonged to the Principality of Zubtsov, which was eventually merged back into the Principality of Tver. In 1485 it was formally annexed by the Grand Duchy of Moscow. The Golden Age of the town began. Between 1519 and 1597 the Principality of Staritsa, subordinate to Moscow, existed with the capital in Staritsa. The principality was ruled by Ivan III's son Andrey, and then by Andrey's son Vladimir. While Ivan the Terrible had no children, Vladimir was regarded by boyars as his only heir. As the Tsar suspected Staritsa's ruler of plotting against him, Vladimir and his children were forced to take poison. The opulence of Staritsa during Vladimir's reign can be seen in the Dormition Monastery.

Limestone (called Staritsa marble) was mined in quarries near Staritsa starting from the 13th century.

In the course of the administrative reform carried out in 1708 by Peter the Great, the area was included into Ingermanlandia Governorate (since 1710 known as Saint Petersburg Governorate), and in 1727 Novgorod Governorate split off. In 1775, Tver Viceroyalty was formed from the lands which previously belonged to Moscow and Novgorod Governorates, and the area was transferred to Tver Viceroyalty, which in 1796 was transformed to Tver Governorate. In 1775, Staritsky Uyezd was established, with the center in Staritsa. Much of the area of the district belonged to Staritsky Uyezd. The southern part of the District belonged to Zubtsovsky Uyezd, also established in 1775. On 3 March 1924, Staritsky Uyezd was abolished and split between Novotorzhsky, Rzhevsky, and Tverskoy Uyezds.

On 12 July 1929, governorates and uyezds were abolished, and Staritsky District with the administrative center in the town of Staritsa was established. It belonged to Rzhev Okrug of Western Oblast. On August 1, 1930 the okrugs were abolished, and the districts were subordinated directly to the oblast. On 29 January 1935 Kalinin Oblast was established, and Staritsky District was transferred to Kalinin Oblast. During World War II, between 12 October 1941 and 1 January 1942, the town was occupied by the German army. In 1990, Kalinin Oblast was renamed Tver Oblast.

== Administrative and municipal status ==
Within the framework of administrative divisions, Staritsa serves as the administrative center of Staritsky District. As an administrative division, it is incorporated within Staritsky District as Staritsa Urban Settlement. As a municipal division, this administrative unit also has urban settlement status and is a part of Staritsky Municipal District.

== Economy ==
=== Industry ===
Main industries in Staritsa are a clothes factory, a flax-manufacturing factory, as well as mechanical and vegetable food factories.

=== Transportation ===
A railway connecting Torzhok and Rzhev has the Staritsa railway station, located about a dozen kilometers northeast of the town of Staritsa.

A paved road connecting Tver to Rzhev crosses the district and passes through Staritsa, where there is a bridge over the Volga. Another road connects Staritsa with Torzhok via Bernovo. There are also local roads with bus traffic originating from Staritsa.

The Volga is navigable but there is no passenger navigation.

== Architecture ==
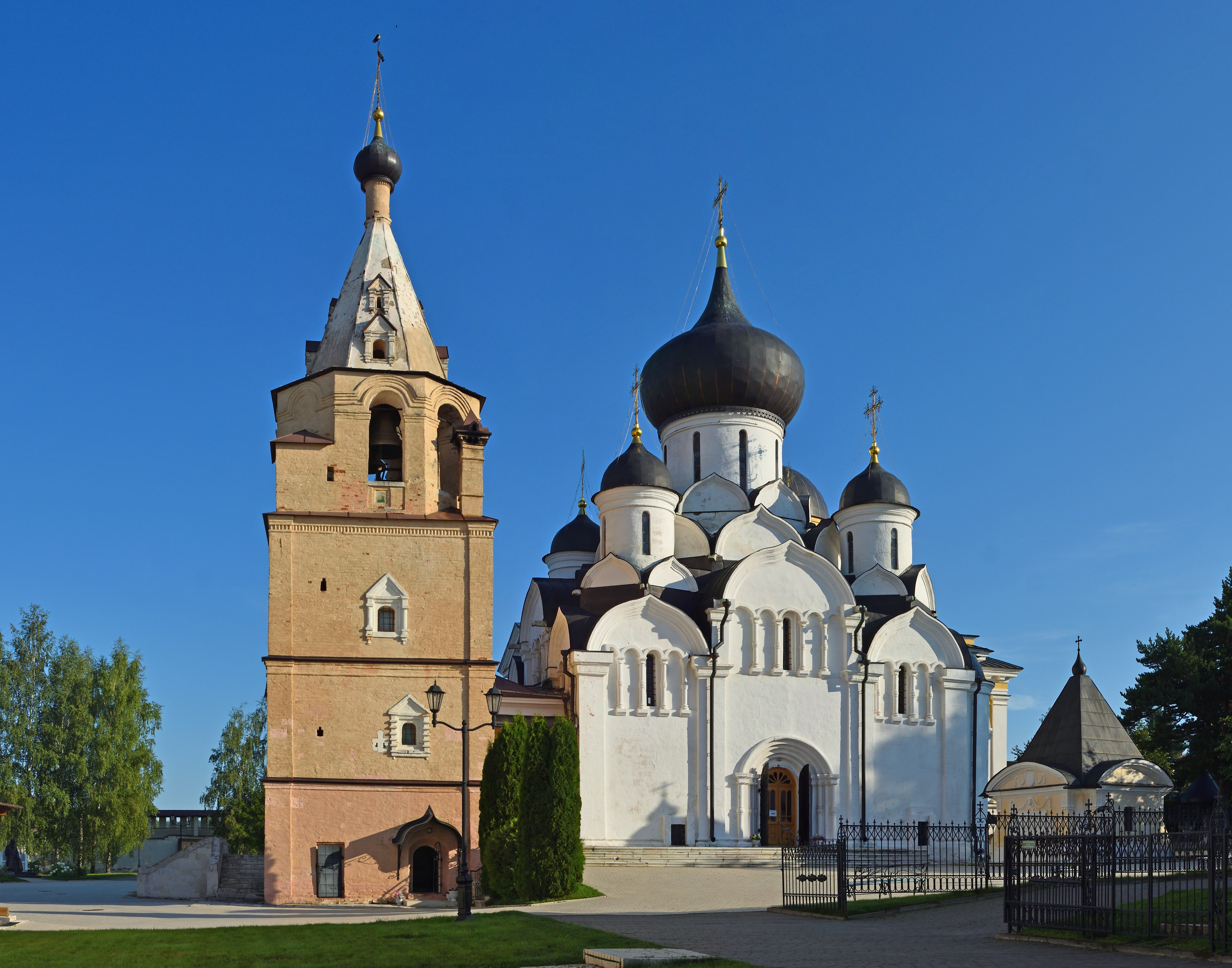
Church of the Dormition in Dormition monastery

The town is split by the river into two parts: the larger left and the smaller right. There are numerous old abandoned limestone quarries in the town's vicinity, explaining an abundance of old limestone buildings in the town.

In the right part of a town a site of an old settlement can be clearly traced, with huge mounds and ground walls. On the opposing left bank of the river stands the Assumption Abbey, with a limestone cathedral from 1530 and a tented refectory from 1570. There are also several churches from the 18th and 19th centuries.

The cathedral of Sts. Boris and Gleb is a ponderous Neoclassical edifice erected from 1805 to 1820. It replaced a many-tented cathedral built in the 1560s by the same masters as worked on the famous St. Basil's Cathedral in Moscow. It was said that Moscow and Staritsa cathedrals were two sisters, just like the rulers of two towns, Ivan and Vladimir, were two brothers.

Staritsa contains 37 cultural heritage monuments of federal significance and additionally 121 objects classified as cultural and historical heritage of local significance. The federal monuments include, in particular, the ensemble of the center of Staritsa (with Dormition Monastery) The Staritsa District museum, open in the town, concentrates on the history of the area.

== Caves ==
Staritsa is also noted among speleologists for its 18th–19th century quarries. The quarries were created by local people, without any general plan, so they are sometimes very tangled and can be used as a smaller model for horizontal cave labyrinths. The longest quarries have a total length of passages of about 3 to 5 kilometers (1.9 to 3.1 mi). The passages are clean and dry, which is unusual for this region. A campaign is ongoing to try to have the quarries recognized as a local heritage site. In the meantime, they are gradually degrading due to lack of supervision.
