= Osuga (Vazuza) =

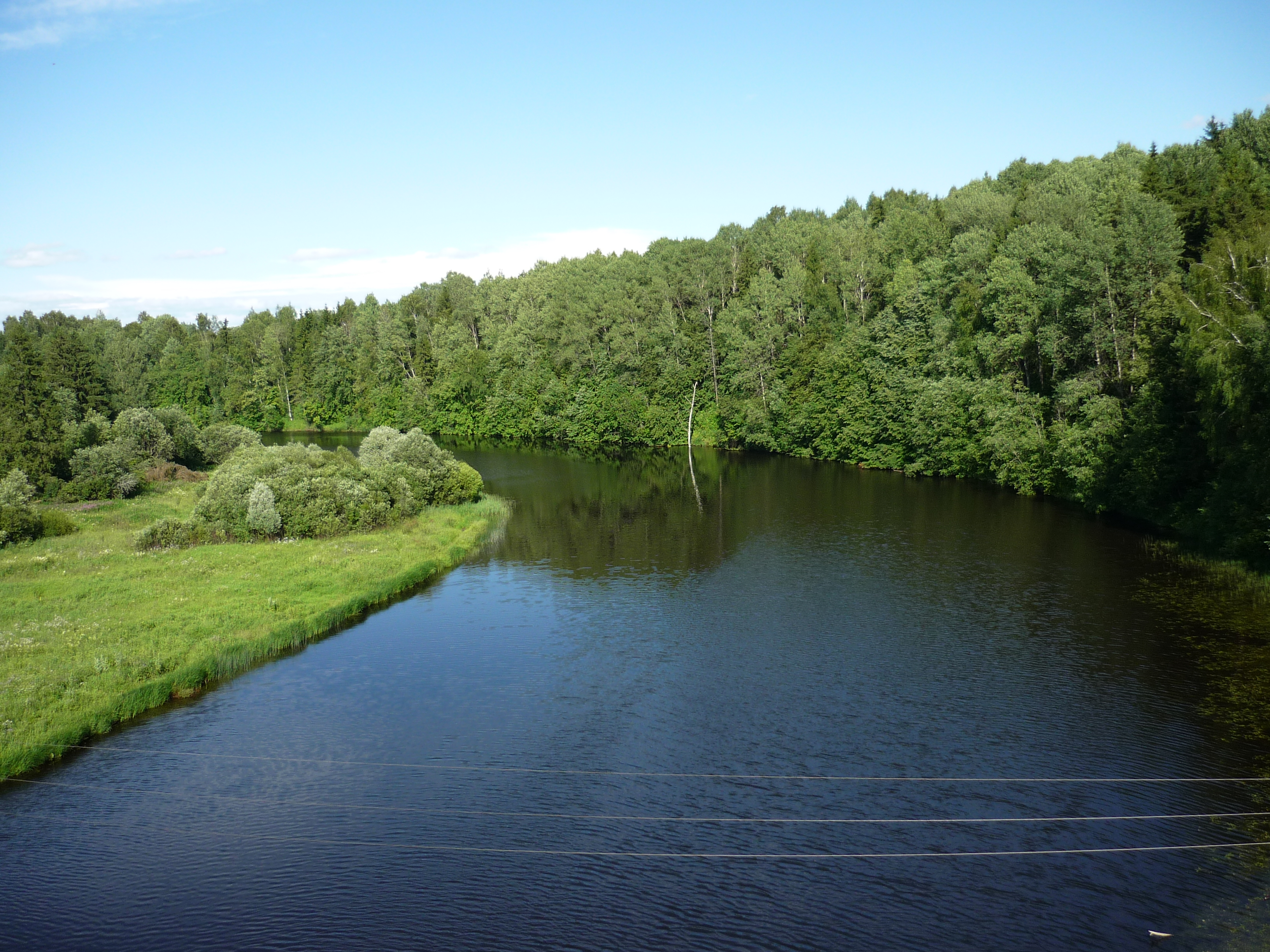
- The Osuga

Location
- Country: Russia

Physical characteristics
- Mouth: Vazuza
  - coordinates: 56.1162°N 34.5182°E
- Length: 100 km (62 mi)
- Basin size: 1,290 km^{2} (500 sq mi)

Basin features
- Progression: Vazuza→ Volga→ Caspian Sea

The Osuga (Russian: река́ Осу́га) is a river in Oleninsky, Rzhevsky, and Zubtsovsky Districts of Tver Oblast and in Sychyovsky District of Smolensk Oblast of Russia, a left tributary of the Vazuza (technically, of Vazuza Reservoir) in the basin of the Volga. The Osuga is 100 kilometres (62 mi) long, and the area of its drainage basin is 1,290 square kilometres (500 mi^{2}).

The source of the Osuga is close to the village of Zavidovo and about 10 kilometres (6.2 mi) southeast from Olenino, the district center. The river flows east. It crosses into Rzhevsky District and by the village of Rykovo turns south and reaches the border with Smolensk Oblast. At the border, the Osuga turns east and makes a stretch of the border between Tver and Smolensk Oblasts. Downstream of the village of Rogachyovo it turns northwest and departs from the border. This last stretch of the Osuga in Tver Oblast is currently a bay of Vazuza Reservoir.

The drainage basin of the Osuga comprises the eastern part of Oleninsky District, the southern part of Rzhevsky District, the northern part of Suchyovsky District, and a tiny area in the northwest of Zubtsovsky District.
