= Pogoreloye Gorodishche =

Village in Tver Oblast, Russia

Coordinates: 56.143°N 34.938°E

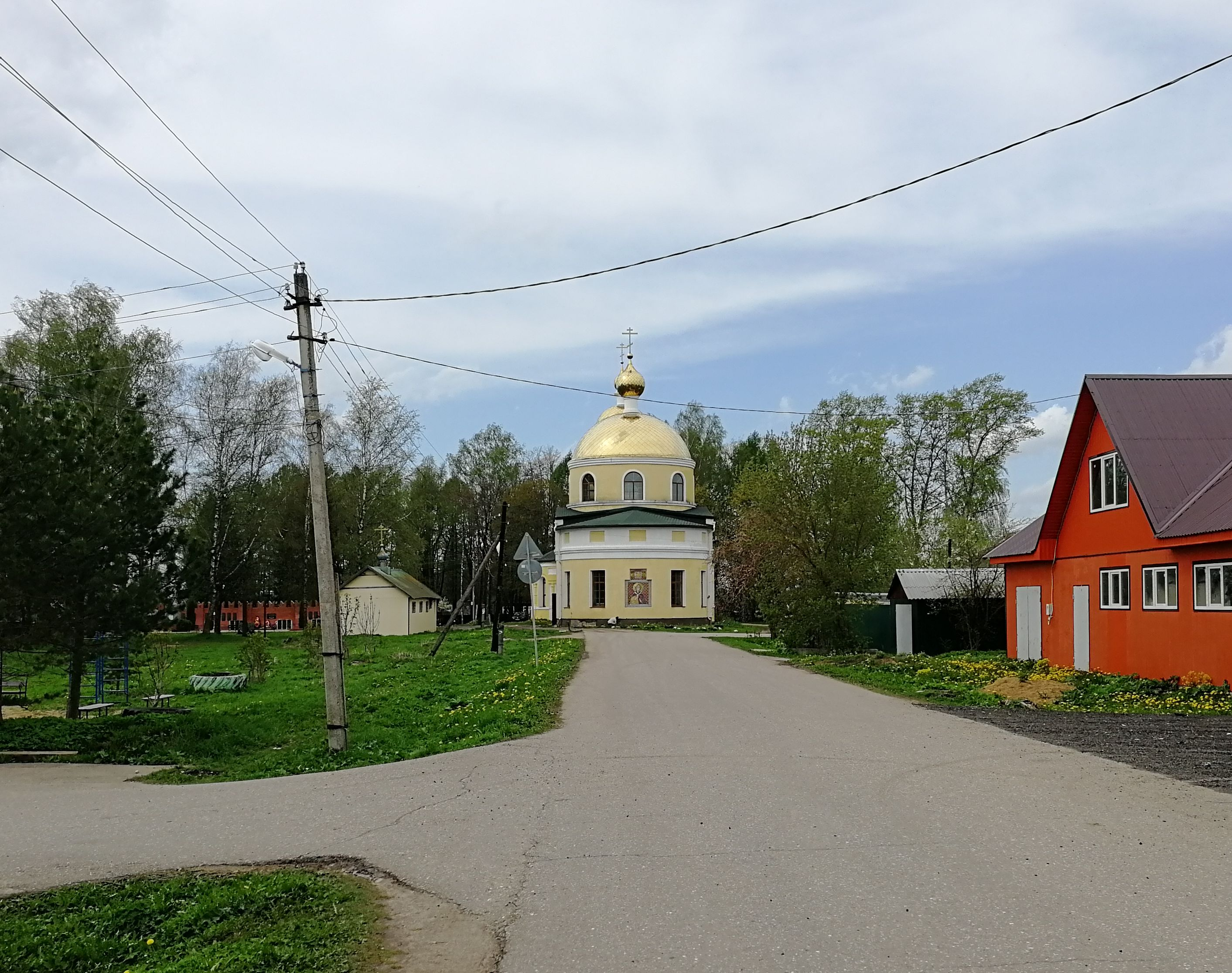

Pogoreloye Gorodishche (Russian: Погорелое Городище, lit. 'Burnt Settlement') is a village in the Zubtsovsky District of the Tver Oblast of Russia. It is the administrative center of the Pogorelskoye agricultural settlement.

== Geography ==
Situated on the Dyorzha River, 150 km southwest of Tver and 25 km east of Zubtsov. The northern border of the village runs along the M9 Baltiya highway, south of the village is the Pogoreloye Gorodishche station of the Moscow-Rzhev-Riga railway line, and 2 km east of the village is the Orlovka private aviation airfield.

== History ==
In the 14th century, near today's Pogoreloye Gorodishche, there was the city of Kholm, the center of the Kholm principality, which was presumably located on the site of today's village of Krasny Kholm in the same Zubtsovsky district.

On the site of today's Pogoreloye Gorodishche there was a suburb of Kholm - Novy Gorodok, which was also called Khorvach. These points were divided between the sons of Vsevolod Kholmsky. Subsequently, Kholm came under the jurisdiction of the Tver Grand Duke's court, and Novy Gorodishche developed. In the 16th century, it became part of the Staritsky Principality. During this period, it was called Novy Gorodishche.
