= Sychyovka, Sychyovsky District, Smolensk Oblast =

Town in Smolensk Oblast, Russia

Sychyovka Сычёвка
- Town
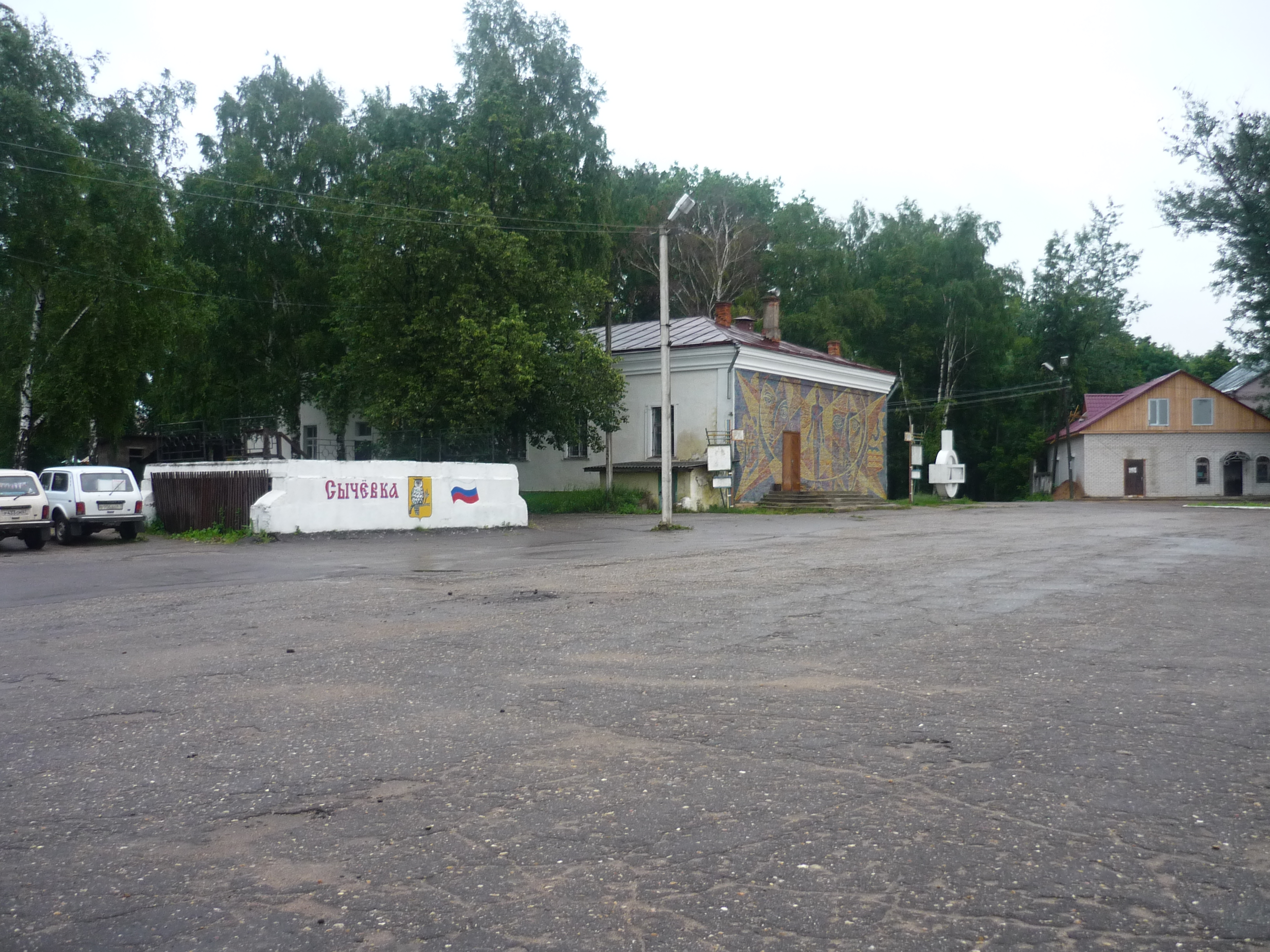
- In Sychyovka

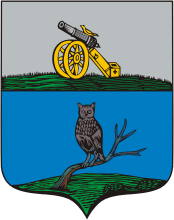
- Coat of arms
- Interactive map of Sychyovka
- Location of Sychyovka Sychyovka (Smolensk Oblast)
- Coordinates: 55°50′N 34°17′E
- Country: Russia
- Federal subject: Smolensk Oblast
- Administrative district: Sychyovsky District
- Urban settlementSelsoviet: Sychyovskoye
- First mentioned: 1488
- Town status since: 1776

Area
  - Total: 11.03 km^{2} (4.26 sq mi)
- Elevation: 200 m (660 ft)

Population (2010 Census)
  - Total: 8,111
  - Estimate (2024): 7,469 (−7.9%)
  - Density: 735.4/km^{2} (1,905/sq mi)

Administrative status
  - Capital of: Sychyovsky District, Sychyovskoye Urban Settlement

Municipal status
  - Municipal district: Sychyovsky Municipal District
  - Urban settlement: Sychyovskoye Urban Settlement
  - Capital of: Sychyovsky Municipal District, Sychyovskoye Urban Settlement
- Time zone: UTC+3 (MSK)
- Postal codes: 215279, 215280
- OKTMO ID: 66646101001

Sychyovka (Russian: Сычёвка) is a town and the administrative center of Sychyovsky District in Smolensk Oblast, Russia, located between the Vazuza and Losmina Rivers, 234 kilometers (145 mi) northeast of Smolensk, the administrative center of the oblast. Population: 8,111 (2010 census); 8,683 (2002 census); 9,643 (1989 Soviet census).

== Etymology ==
The name of the town derives from the Russian word "сыч" (sych), which literally means "little owl", but can also mean "a gloomy person".

== History ==
It was first mentioned in 1488 as a votchina of a Tver prince Ivan the Young, son of Ivan III. In 1493, it became a palace village in Vyazminsky Uyezd. In 1776, Sychyovka was granted town status. During World War II, the town was occupied by the German Army from October 10, 1941 until March 8, 1943, when it was liberated by troops of the Soviet Western Front.

On January 7, 1943, Jews of the town were murdered in a mass execution perpetrated by an Einsatzgruppen.

== Administrative and municipal status ==
Within the framework of administrative divisions, Sychyovka serves as the administrative center of Sychyovsky District. As an administrative division, it is incorporated within Sychyovsky District as Sychyovskoye Urban Settlement. As a municipal division, this administrative unit also has urban settlement status and is a part of Sychyovsky Municipal District.

== Economy ==
Since 1956, a special psychiatric hospital has been operating (Sychevka, Karl Marx Street, 71) for the detention of mentally ill criminal offenders, serving the entire Russia's territory along with the Kazan special psychiatric hospital.
