= Losmina =

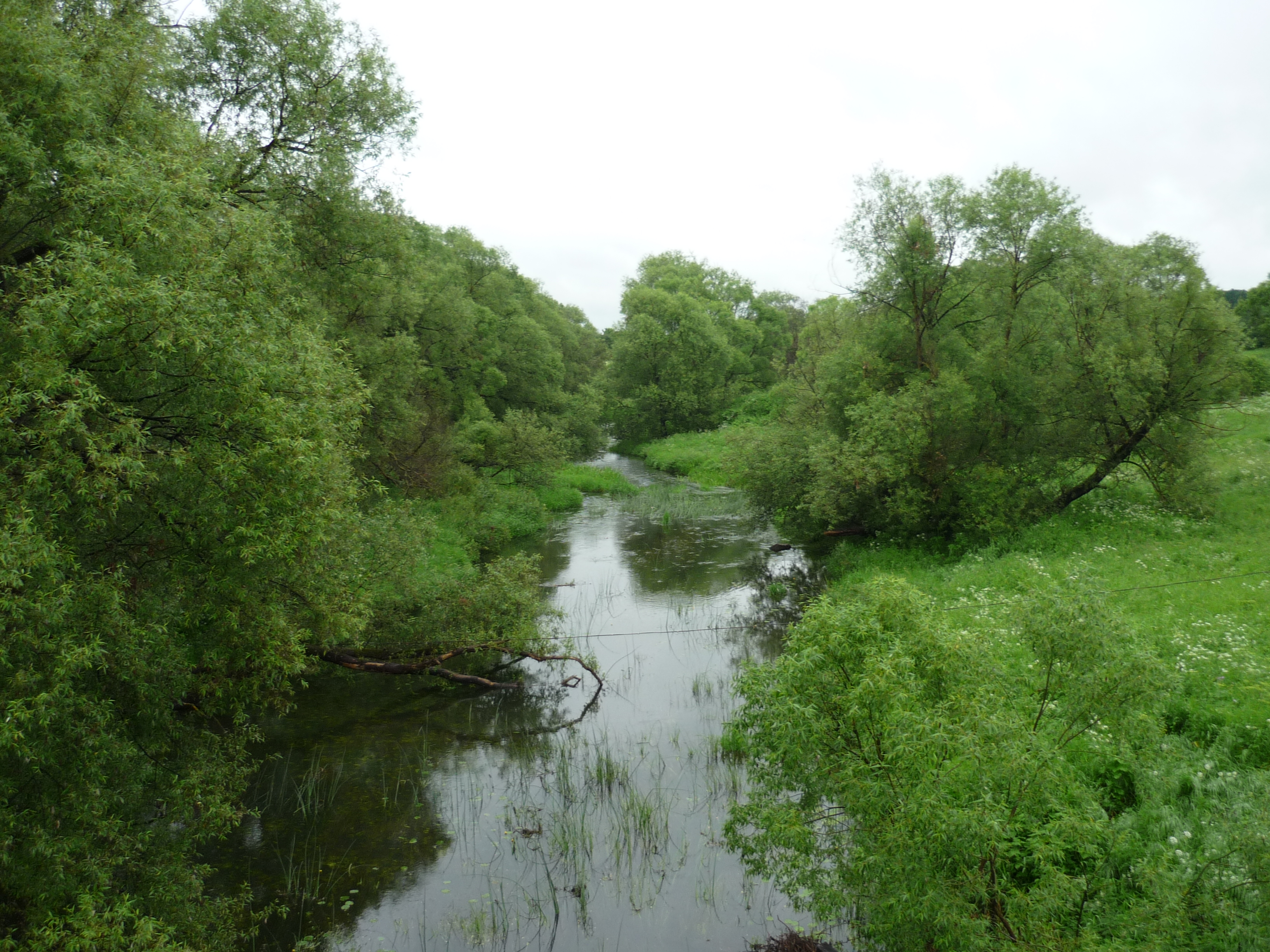
- The Losmina near Sychyovka
- Native name: Лосьмина (Russian)

Location
- Country: Russia
- Region: Smolensk Oblast
- Town: Sychyovka

Physical characteristics
- Mouth: Vazuza
  - coordinates: 55.8522°N 34.3076°E
- Length: 49 km (30 mi)
- Basin size: 421 km^{2} (163 sq mi)

Basin features
- Progression: Vazuza→ Volga→ Caspian Sea

The Losmina (Russian: Лосьми́на) is a river in Smolensk Oblast, Russia, a left tributary of the Vazuza. It is 49 kilometres (30 mi) long, and has a drainage basin of 421 square kilometres (163 sq mi).

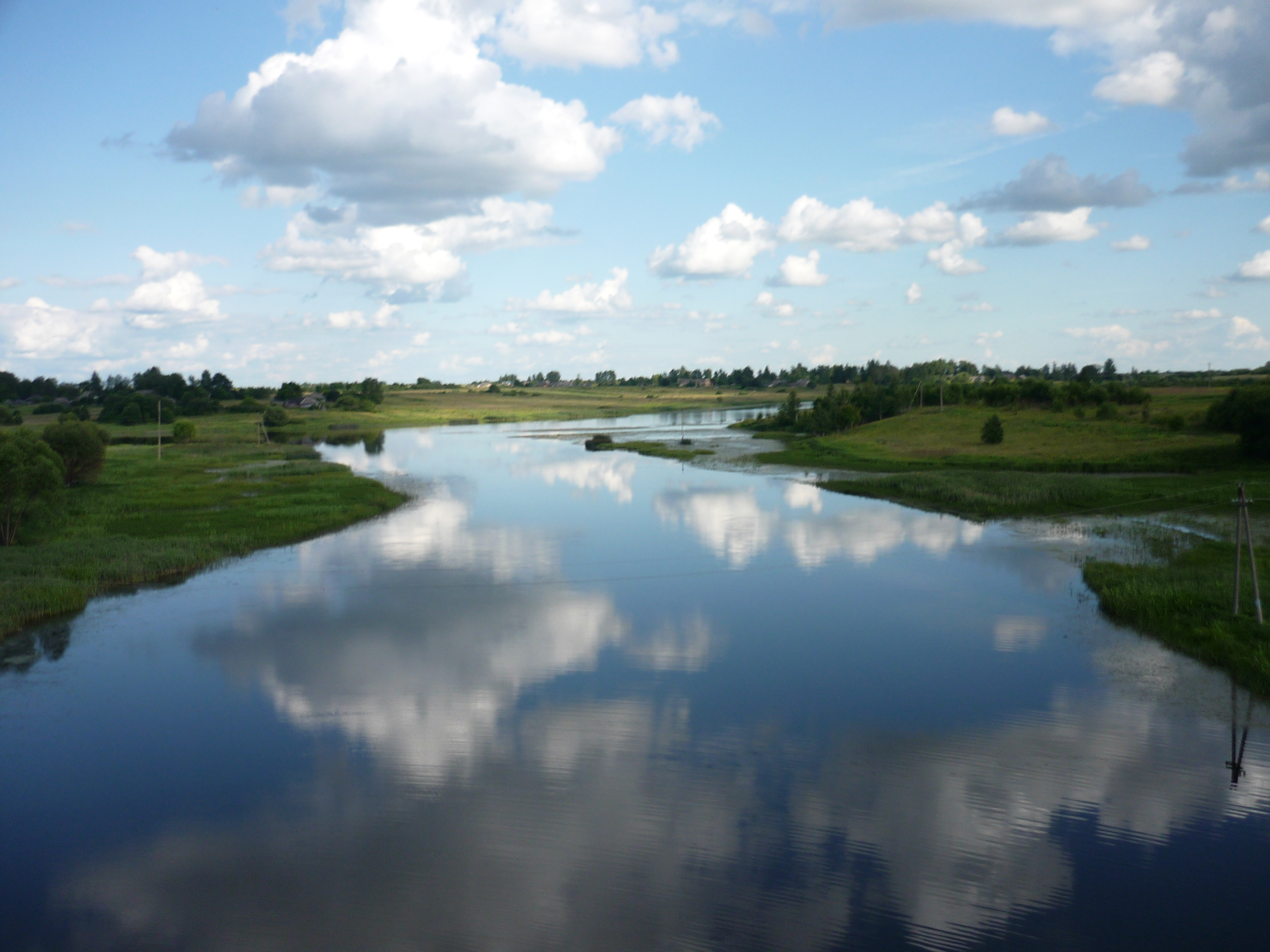
Mouth of the Losmina
