= Vazuza Reservoir =

Reservoir in Tver and Smolensk Oblasts, Russia

- Вазузское водохранилище (Russian)
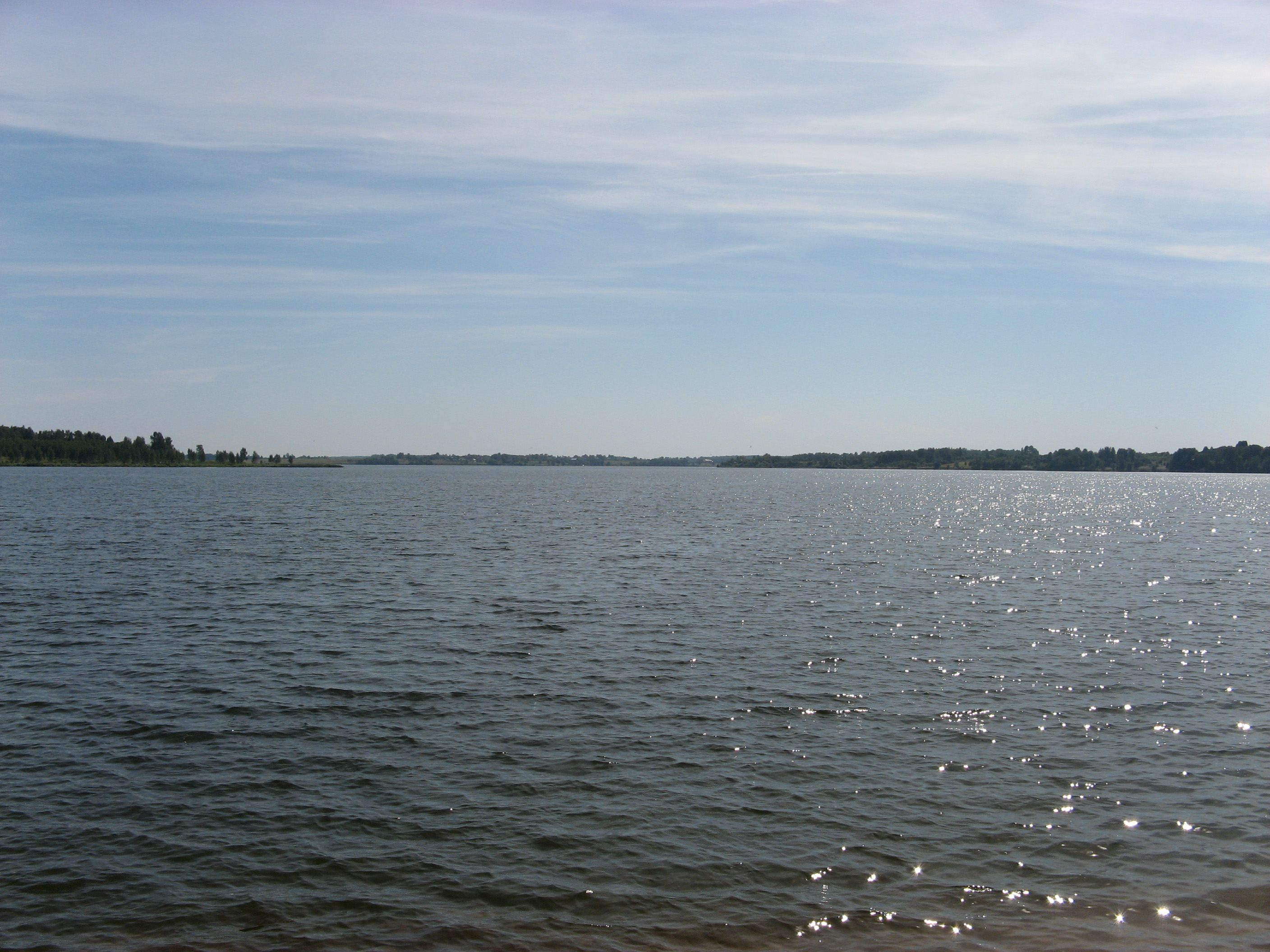
- Interactive map of Vazuza Reservoir
- Location: Russia
- Coordinates: 55°51′38″N 34°42′26″E
- River sources: Vazuza River

The Vazuza Reservoir (Russian: Вазузское водохранилище) is a reservoir based on the lower channel of the Vazuza River, in Tver Oblast and Smolensk Oblast, Russia. It was filled in 1977–1978.

The dam is between the Pashutino and Chaika villages, Zubtsovsky District, Tver Oblast. 4.7 km above the dam the reservoir is split into two branches: the left one (27.8 km) is along Vazuza, the left one (16.5) is along its tributary, Osuga River. The Vazuza branches further, adding tributaries of Kasnya and Gzhat, and connecting with Yauza River via the Vazuza-Yauza Canal. The Gzhat branch gives rise to the Lower Part of Vazuza Reservoir, of length 62 km, which in one stretch (10 km) has the widest reach of the reservoir, of average width of 1 km, maximal width 2.4 km.

It is a reserve freshwater reservoir for Moscow, feeding the Vazuza Hydrotechnical System.
