= Gzhat =

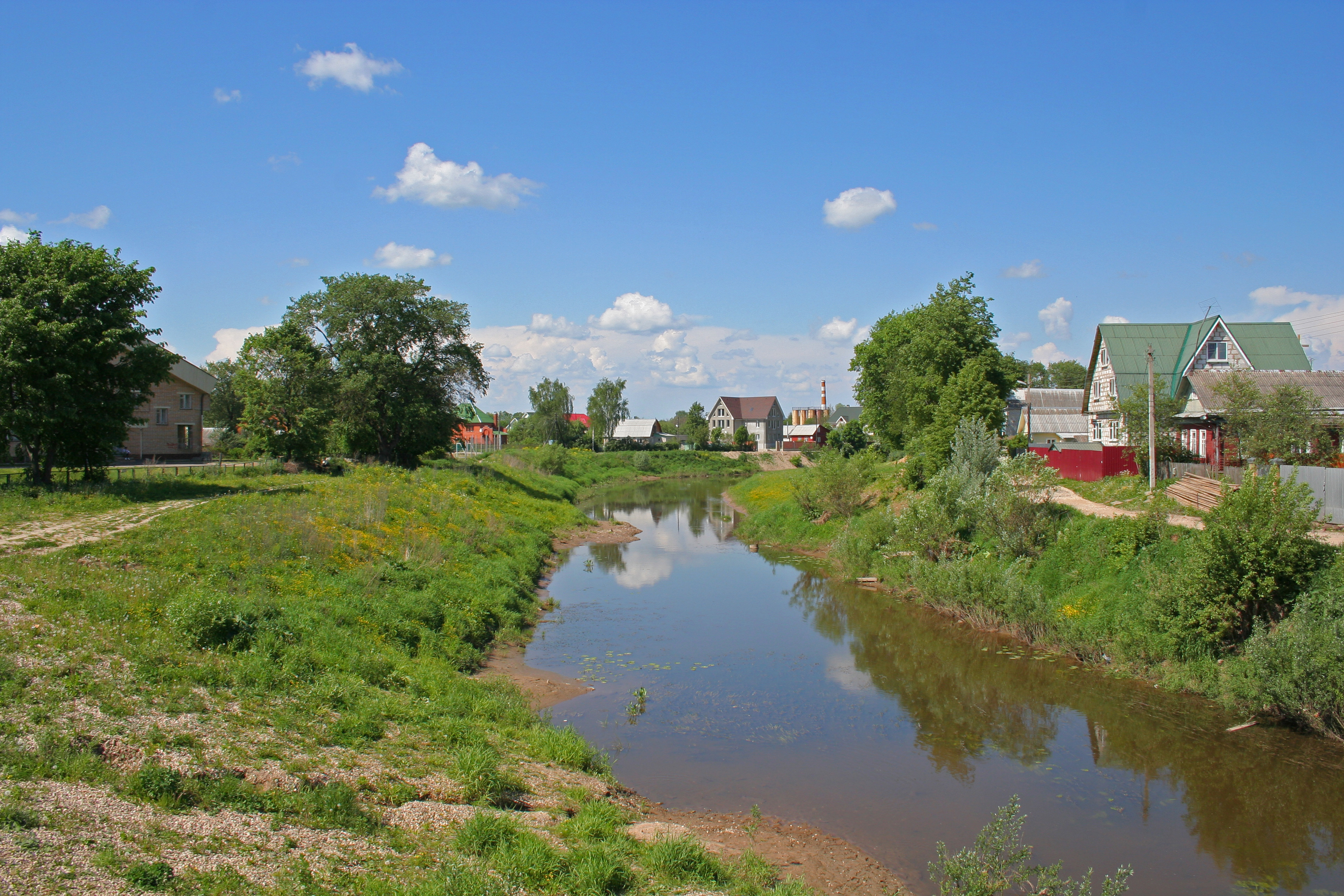
- Native name: Гжать (Russian)

Location
- Country: Russia

Physical characteristics
- Mouth: Vazuza
  - coordinates: 55.9283°N 34.5382°E
- Length: 113 km (70 mi)
- Basin size: 2,370 km^{2} (920 sq mi)

Basin features
- Progression: Vazuza→ Volga→ Caspian Sea

The Gzhat (Russian: Гжать) is a river in Smolensk Oblast, Russia. It is 113 km long, with a drainage basin of 2370 km². It is a right tributary of the Vazuza. The town of Gagarin lies by the Gzhat.
