= Gagarinsky District, Smolensk Oblast =

Gagarinsky District Гагаринский район (Russian)
- District
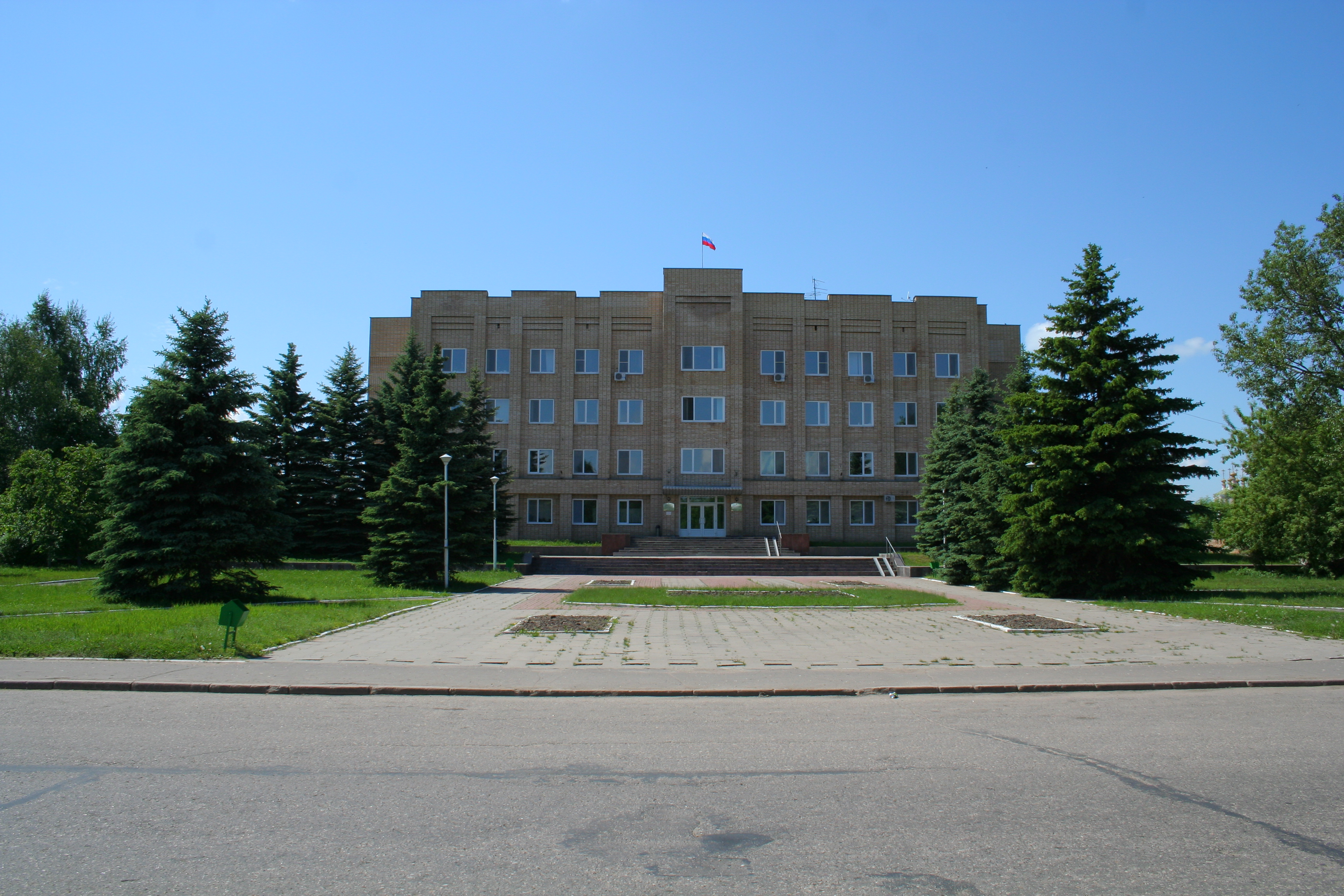
- Gagarinsky District administration building

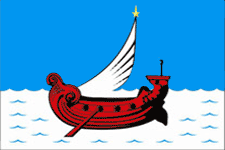
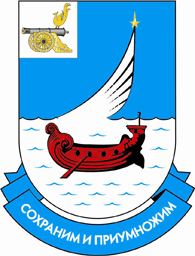
- Flag Coat of arms
- Location of Gagarinsky District in Smolensk Oblast
- Coordinates: 55°35′39″N 35°23′19″E
- Country: Russia
- Federal subject: Smolensk Oblast
- Established: 1929
- Administrative center: Gagarin

Area
  - Total: 2,904.59 km^{2} (1,121.47 sq mi)

Population (2010 Census)
  - Total: 48,928
  - Density: 16.845/km^{2} (43.629/sq mi)
  - Urban: 64.8%
  - Rural: 35.2%

Administrative structure
  - Administrative divisions: 1 Urban settlements, 15 Rural settlements
  - Inhabited localities: 1 cities/towns, 254 rural localities

Municipal structure
  - Municipally incorporated as: Gagarinsky Municipal District
  - Municipal divisions: 1 urban settlements, 15 rural settlements
- Time zone: UTC+3 (MSK)
- OKTMO ID: 66608000
- Website: http://www.rodinagagarina.ru/

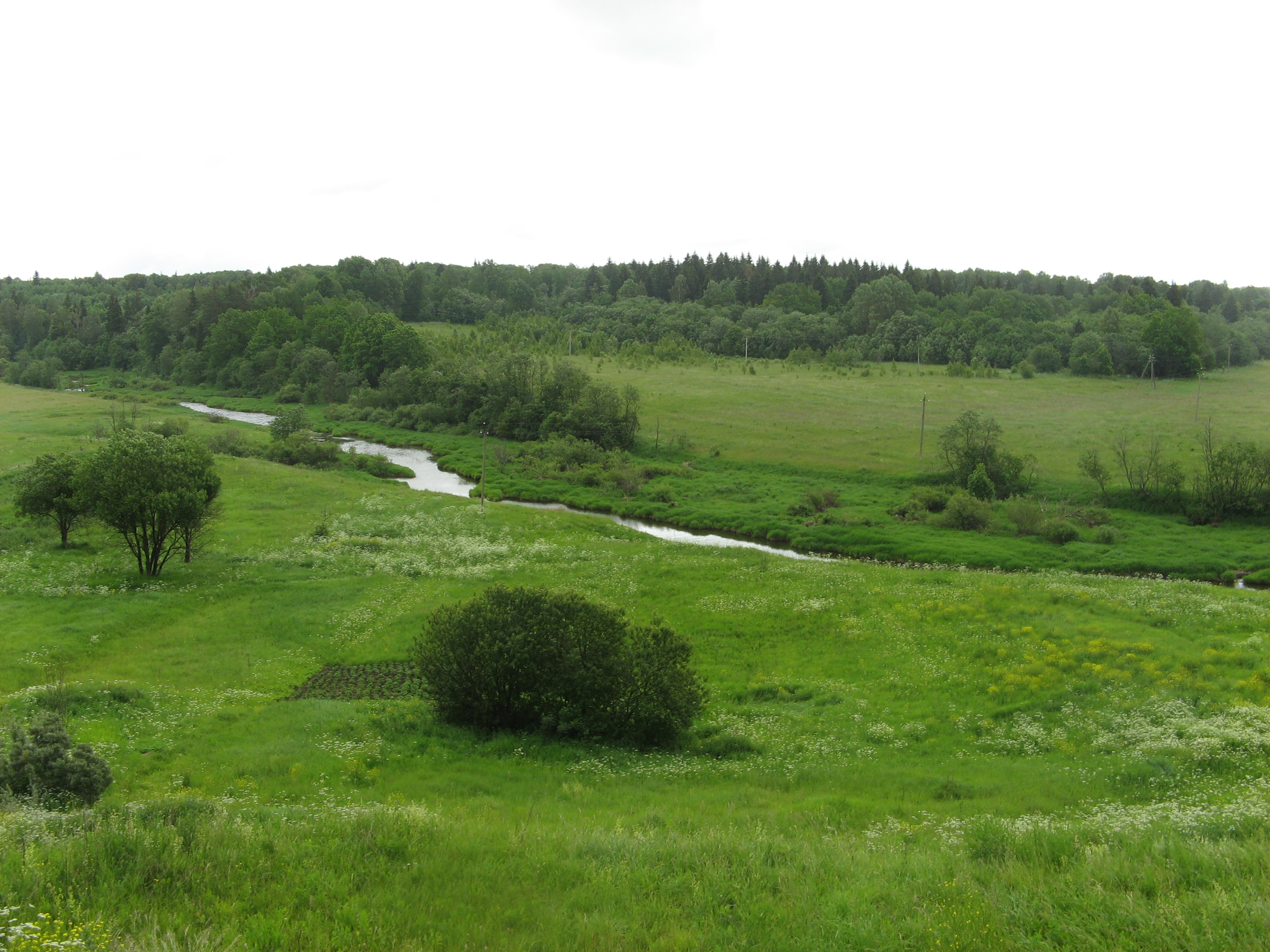
The Yauza River in the selo of Karmanovo in Gagarinsky District

Gagarinsky District (Russian: Гага́ринский райо́н) is an administrative and municipal district (raion), one of the twenty-five in Smolensk Oblast, Russia. It is located in the northeast of the oblast. The area of the district is 2,904.59 square kilometers (1,121.47 sq mi). Its administrative center is the town of Gagarin. Population: 48,928 (2010 Census); 46,401 (2002 census); 21,978 (1989 Soviet census). The population of Gagarin accounts for 64.8% of the district's total population.
