= Staritsky Uyezd =

Staritsky Uyezd (Старицкий уезд) was one of the subdivisions of the Tver Governorate of the Russian Empire. It was situated in the southcentral part of the governorate. Its administrative centre was Staritsa.

== Demographics ==
At the time of the Russian Empire Census of 1897, Staritsky Uyezd had a population of 146,143. Of these, 99.8% spoke Russian as their native language.
