= Sychyovsky District =

Sychyovsky District Сычёвский район (Russian)
- District
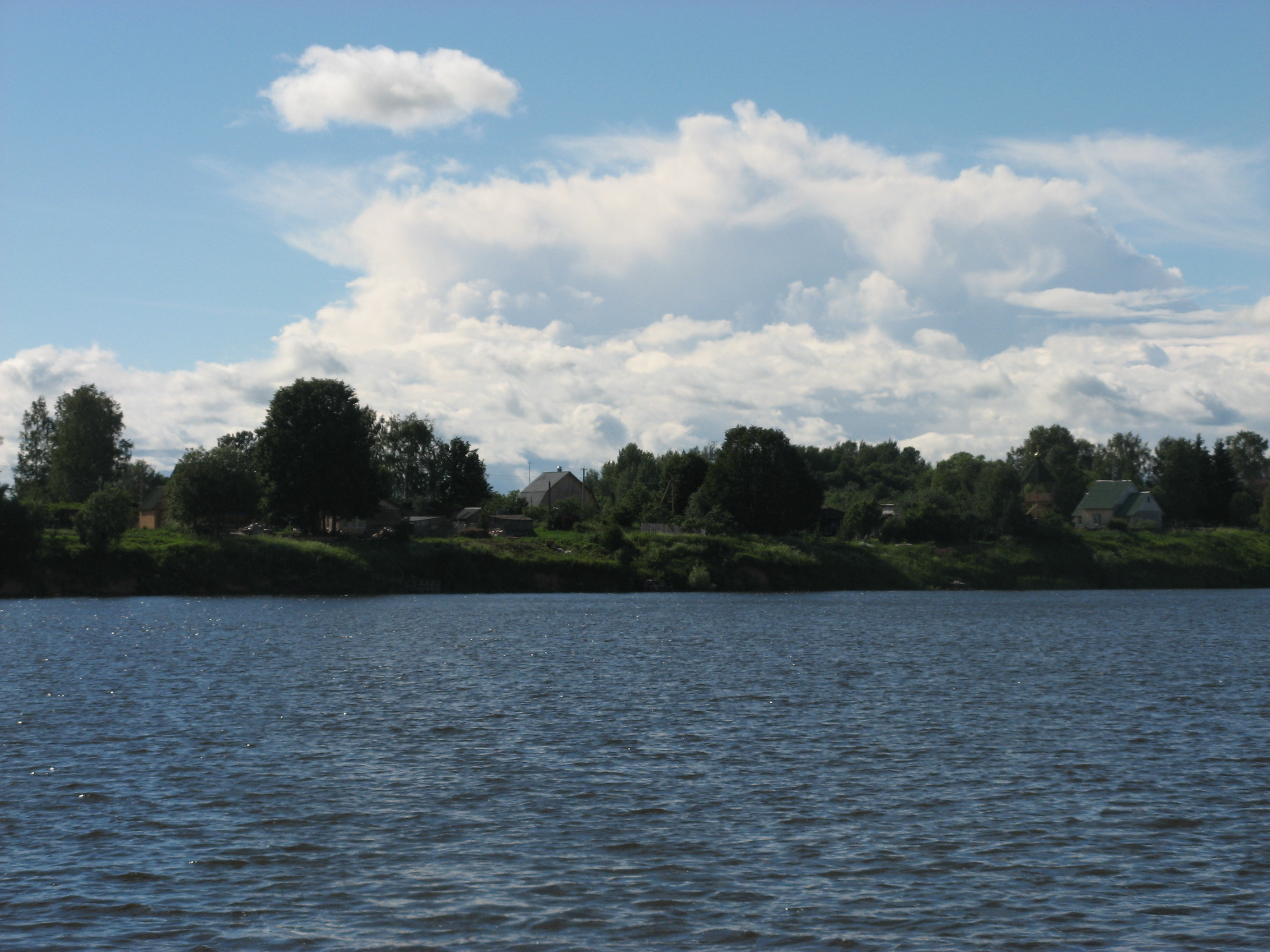
- View of the village of Khlepen over the Vazuza River in Sychyovsky District

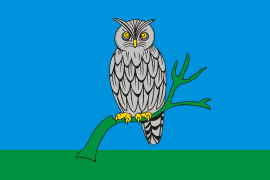
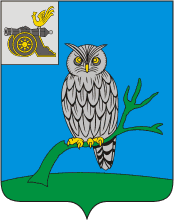
- Flag Coat of arms
- Location of Sychyovsky District in Smolensk Oblast
- Coordinates: 56°04′N 33°55′E
- Country: Russia
- Federal subject: Smolensk Oblast
- Established: 1929
- Administrative center: Sychyovka

Area
  - Total: 1,803.90 km^{2} (696.49 sq mi)

Population (2010 Census)
  - Total: 14,158
  - Density: 7.8486/km^{2} (20.328/sq mi)
  - Urban: 57.3%
  - Rural: 42.7%

Administrative structure
  - Administrative divisions: 1 Urban settlements, 11 Rural settlements
  - Inhabited localities: 1 cities/towns, 131 rural localities

Municipal structure
  - Municipally incorporated as: Sychyovsky Municipal District
  - Municipal divisions: 1 urban settlements, 4 rural settlements
- Time zone: UTC+3 (MSK)
- OKTMO ID: 66646000
- Website: http://sichevka-adm.ru

Sychyovsky District (Russian: Сычёвский райо́н) is an administrative and municipal district (raion), one of the twenty-five in Smolensk Oblast, Russia. It is located in the northeast of the oblast. The area of the district is 1,803.90 square kilometers (696.49 sq mi). Its administrative center is the town of Sychyovka. Population: 14,158 (2010 Census); 15,835 (2002 census); 18,847 (1989 Soviet census). The population of Sychyovka accounts for 57.3% of the district's total population.

== Geography ==
The western part of Sychyovsky District is a highland where sources of several rivers are located, including one of the Dnieper in the western tip of the district. Northwestern tip of the district belongs to the Western Dvina (Daugava) basin, while the rest (mostly Sychyovka lowland) drains into the Volga via the Vazuza River; some territories were flooded when a reservoir was built.

Thus, the Mediterranean–Atlantic–Caspian tripoint of the European Watershed lies there. In other words, Sychyovsky District is the eastern terminus of the Atlantic–Mediterranean watershed in Europe.

== Notable people ==
- Nikolai Krylenko (1885–1938)
- Antonina Makarova (1920–1979)
