= Gagarin, Smolensk Oblast =

Town in Smolensk Oblast, Russia

Gagarin Гагарин
- Town
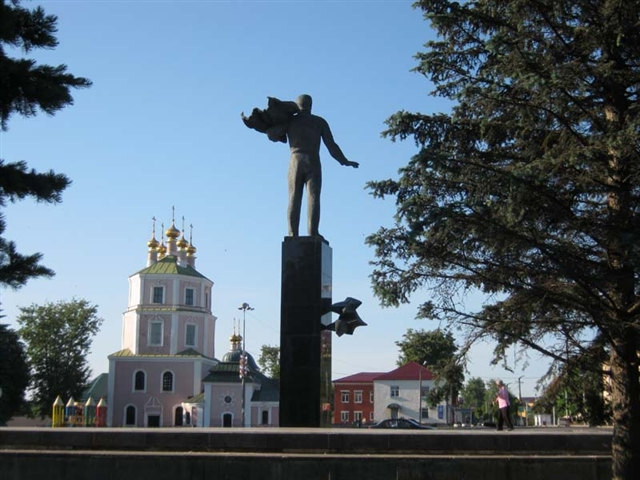
- Monument to Yuri Gagarin in the town

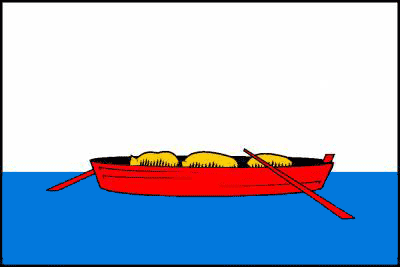
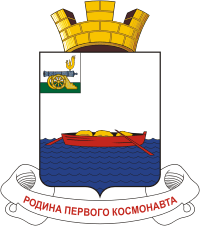
- Flag Coat of arms
- Interactive map of Gagarin
- Location of Gagarin Gagarin (European Russia) Gagarin (Russia) Gagarin (Europe) Gagarin (Earth)
- Coordinates: 55°33′N 35°01′E
- Country: Russia
- Federal subject: Smolensk Oblast
- Administrative district: Gagarinsky District
- Urban settlementSelsoviet: Gagarinskoye
- Founded: 1718
- Town status since: 1776

Government
  - Mayor: Andrey Puzikov (acting)

Area
  - Total: 17.93 km^{2} (6.92 sq mi)
- Elevation: 194 m (636 ft)

Population (2010 Census)
  - Total: 31,721
  - Estimate (2024): 25,374 (−20%)
  - Density: 1,769/km^{2} (4,582/sq mi)

Administrative status
  - Capital of: Gagarinsky District, Gagarinskoye Urban Settlement

Municipal status
  - Municipal district: Gagarinsky Municipal District
  - Urban settlement: Gagarinskoye Urban Settlement
  - Capital of: Gagarinsky Municipal District, Gagarinskoye Urban Settlement
- Time zone: UTC+3 (MSK)
- Postal codes: 215010, 215059
- Dialing code: +7 48135
- OKTMO ID: 66608101001
- Website: www.gagarinadmin.ru

Gagarin (Russian: Гага́рин), known until 1968 as Gzhatsk (Гжатск), is a town and the administrative centre of Gagarinsky District of Smolensk Oblast, Russia, located on the Gzhat River, 240 kilometers (150 mi) northeast of Smolensk, the administrative centre of the oblast. Population: 31,721 (2010 census); 28,789 (2002 census); 28,867 (1989 Soviet census).

Gagarin is named for Yuri Gagarin, the first person to travel into space. The town's former name is from that of the Gzhat River, which is of Baltic origin (cf. Old Prussian gudde, meaning "forest").

== Geography ==
=== Climate ===
Gagarin has a warm-summer humid continental climate (Dfb in the Köppen climate classification).

Climate data for Gagarin
| Month | Jan | Feb | Mar | Apr | May | Jun | Jul | Aug | Sep | Oct | Nov | Dec | Year |
|---|---|---|---|---|---|---|---|---|---|---|---|---|---|
| Mean daily maximum °C (°F) | −5.1 (22.8) | −4.2 (24.4) | 1.4 (34.5) | 10.5 (50.9) | 17.1 (62.8) | 20.1 (68.2) | 23 (73) | 21.3 (70.3) | 15.5 (59.9) | 8 (46) | 1.7 (35.1) | −2.3 (27.9) | 8.9 (48.0) |
| Daily mean °C (°F) | −7.2 (19.0) | −6.8 (19.8) | −1.9 (28.6) | 6.1 (43.0) | 12.9 (55.2) | 16.4 (61.5) | 19.3 (66.7) | 17.6 (63.7) | 12.1 (53.8) | 5.6 (42.1) | −0.1 (31.8) | −4.1 (24.6) | 5.8 (42.5) |
| Mean daily minimum °C (°F) | −9.6 (14.7) | −9.8 (14.4) | −5.6 (21.9) | 1.1 (34.0) | 7.8 (46.0) | 11.7 (53.1) | 14.9 (58.8) | 13.5 (56.3) | 8.6 (47.5) | 3.2 (37.8) | −1.9 (28.6) | −6.1 (21.0) | 2.3 (36.2) |
| Average precipitation mm (inches) | 49 (1.9) | 42 (1.7) | 43 (1.7) | 43 (1.7) | 74 (2.9) | 79 (3.1) | 88 (3.5) | 75 (3.0) | 64 (2.5) | 63 (2.5) | 54 (2.1) | 49 (1.9) | 723 (28.5) |
Source: https://en.climate-data.org/asia/russian-federation/smolensk-oblast/gagarin-762161/

== History ==
In 1718, a village on the territory of modern Gagarin was transformed by a decree of Peter the Great to a transshipment landing stage (called Gzhatsky landing stage). From the mid-18th century, Gzhatsk was a sloboda, and in 1776, by a decree by Catherine the Great, it was granted uyezd town status and a coat of arms showing "a barge loaded with bread ready for departure, on a field argent", meaning that the town was a good landing stage for grain.

The town was built at the crossing of the Moscow road (east-west) and the Smolensk road (north-south, paralleling the river). By the plan of 1773, it was laid out in triangular form. One part paralleled the Gzhat River, another—the road to Moscow, and the base of the triangle connected them.

On August 29, 1812, in the village of Tsaryovo-Zaymishche near Gzhatsk, Mikhail Kutuzov accepted command of the Russian army. On the day of Napoleon's invasion, the town was set on fire and burned for several days. It was near Gzhatsk where Denis Davydov's guerrilla group started to operate. Russian troops entered the town again on November 2, 1812. When the town was rebuilt in 1817, the former regular layout was basically kept.

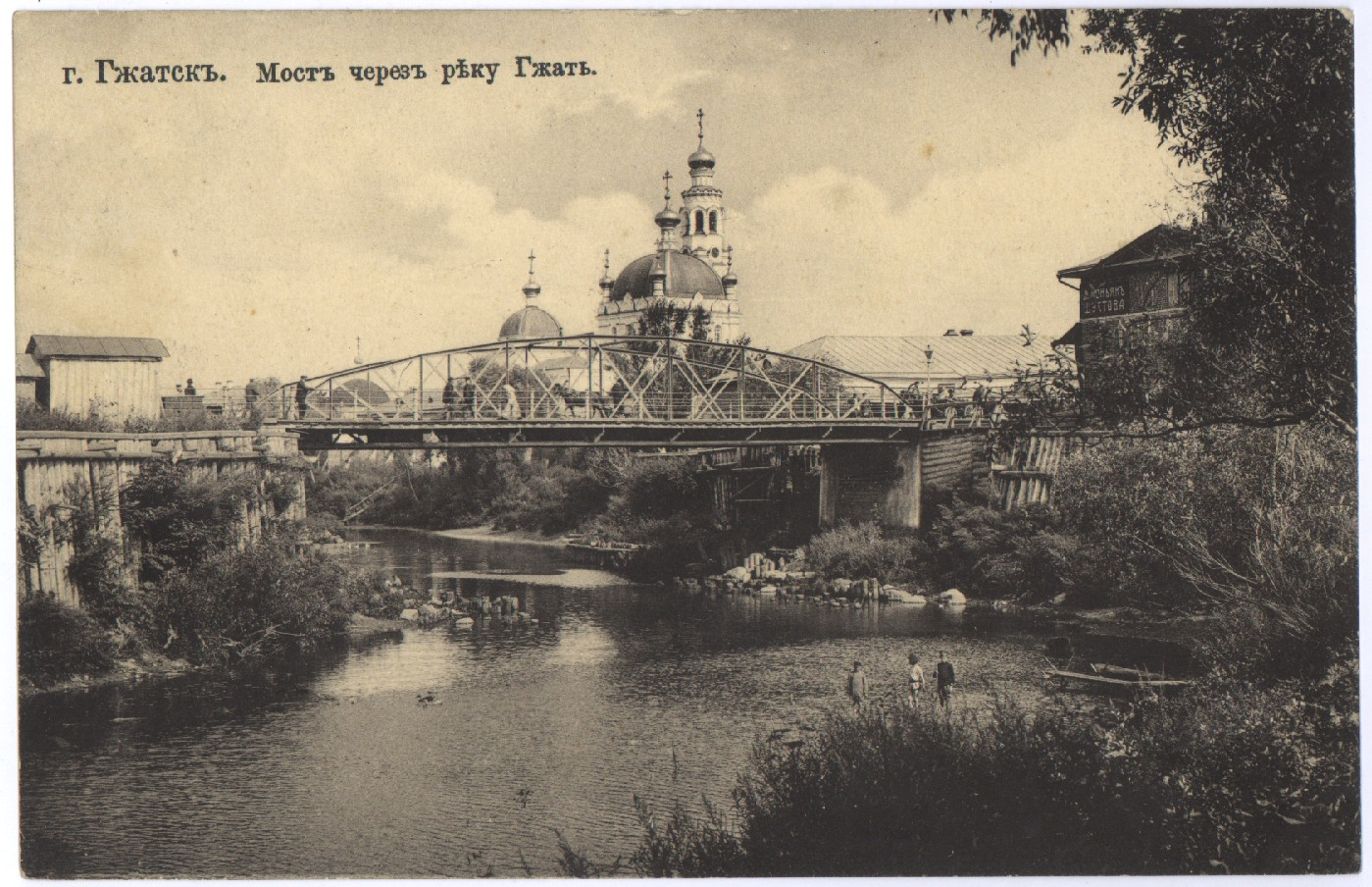
Early-20th-century view

On November 13 [O.S. October 31], 1917, Soviet power was proclaimed in Gzhatsk and its uyezd. A year later, there was a counterrevolutionary insurrection.

During World War II, the town housed a flax factory, a sawmill, a brickyard, a roller-mill, a bakehouse complex, a weaving factory, a power station, and a number of guilds. In the course of the war, Gzhatsk was occupied by the German Army from October 9, 1941 until March 6, 1943, when it was liberated by the troops of the Soviet Western Front. From January to April 1942, the Germans operated the Dulag 124 prisoner-of-war camp in the town, in which at least 5,000 prisoners are believed to have died due to exhaustion, beatings, cold and executions.

In 1968, the town was renamed Gagarin in honor of the first person to travel into space, Yuri Gagarin, who was born in 1934 in the nearby village of Klushino.

== Administrative and municipal status ==
Within the framework of administrative divisions, Gagarin serves as the administrative center of Gagarinsky District. As an administrative division, it is, together with one rural locality (the settlement of Trufany), incorporated within Gagarinsky District as Gagarinskoye Urban Settlement. As a municipal division, this administrative unit also has urban settlement status and is a part of Gagarinsky Municipal District.

== International relations ==
Gagarin is twinned with:

- Barysaw, Belarus
- Krupki, Belarus
- Orsha, Belarus
- Ratingen, Germany
