= Zubtsovsky Uyezd =

Zubtsovsky Uyezd (Russian: Зубцовский уезд) was one of the subdivisions of the Tver Governorate of the Russian Empire. It was situated in the southern part of the governorate. Its administrative center was Zubtsov.

== Demographics ==
At the time of the Russian Empire Census of 1897, Zubtsovsky Uyezd had a population of 103,109. Of these, 98.7% spoke Russian and 1.2% Karelian as their native language.
