= Rzhevsky Uyezd =

Rzhevsky Uyezd (Ржевский уезд) was one of the subdivisions of the Tver Governorate of the Russian Empire. It was situated in the southwestern part of the governorate. Its administrative centre was Rzhev.

== Demographics ==
At the time of the Russian Empire Census of 1897, Rzhevsky Uyezd had a population of 143,789. Of these, 99.3% spoke Russian, 0.2% Belarusian, 0.2% Polish, 0.1% Ukrainian, 0.1% Yiddish and 0.1% German as their native language.
