= Martyanovo =

Martyanovo (Russian: Мартьяново) is the name of several rural localities in Russia.

== Modern localities ==
=== Ivanovo Oblast ===
As of 2012, one rural locality in Ivanovo Oblast bears this name:

- Martyanovo, Ivanovo Oblast, a village in Ilyinsky District

=== Kostroma Oblast ===
As of 2012, one rural locality in Kostroma Oblast bears this name:

- Martyanovo, Chukhlomsky District, Kostroma Oblast, a village in Sudayskoye Settlement of Chukhlomsky District; 58°58′N 42°49′E

=== Moscow Oblast ===
As of 2012, two rural localities in Moscow Oblast bear this name:

- Martyanovo, Odintsovsky District, Moscow Oblast, a village in Nikolskoye Rural Settlement of Odintsovsky District
- Martyanovo, Serpukhovsky District, Moscow Oblast, a village in Dankovskoye Rural Settlement of Serpukhovsky District

=== Nizhny Novgorod Oblast ===
As of 2012, one rural locality in Nizhny Novgorod Oblast bears this name:

- Martyanovo, Nizhny Novgorod Oblast, a village in Vladimirsky Selsoviet of Voskresensky District

=== Oryol Oblast ===
As of 2012, one rural locality in Oryol Oblast bears this name:

- Martyanovo, Oryol Oblast, a village in Soskovsky Selsoviet of Soskovsky District

=== Perm Krai ===
As of 2012, two rural localities in Perm Krai bear this name:

- Martyanovo, Permsky District, Perm Krai, a village in Permsky District
- Martyanovo, Suksunsky District, Perm Krai, a village in Suksunsky District

=== Pskov Oblast ===
As of 2012, three rural localities in Pskov Oblast bear this name:

- Martyanovo, Kunyinsky District, Pskov Oblast, a village in Kunyinsky District
- Martyanovo, Loknyansky District, Pskov Oblast, a village in Loknyansky District
- Martyanovo, Velikoluksky District, Pskov Oblast, a village in Velikoluksky District

=== Sverdlovsk Oblast ===
As of 2012, one rural locality in Sverdlovsk Oblast bears this name:

- Martyanovo, Sverdlovsk Oblast, a village in Shalinsky District

=== Tver Oblast ===
As of 2012, one rural locality in Tver Oblast bears this name:

- Martyanovo, Tver Oblast, a village in Staritsa Rural Settlement of Staritsky District

=== Vologda Oblast ===
As of 2012, two rural localities in Vologda Oblast bear this name:

- Martyanovo, Cherepovetsky District, Vologda Oblast, a village in Batransky Selsoviet of Cherepovetsky District
- Martyanovo, Vologodsky District, Vologda Oblast, a village in Kubensky Selsoviet of Vologodsky District

=== Yaroslavl Oblast ===
As of 2012, three rural localities in Yaroslavl Oblast bear this name:

- Martyanovo, Lyubimsky District, Yaroslavl Oblast, a village in Troitsky Rural Okrug of Lyubimsky District
- Martyanovo, Poshekhonsky District, Yaroslavl Oblast, a village in Gayutinsky Rural Okrug of Poshekhonsky District
- Martyanovo, Rybinsky District, Yaroslavl Oblast, a village in Pogorelsky Rural Okrug of Rybinsky District

== Abolished localities ==
- Martyanovo, Parfenyevsky District, Kostroma Oblast, a village in Matveyevsky Selsoviet of Parfenyevsky District in Kostroma Oblast; abolished on October 18, 2004
