= Kunyinsky District =

Kunyinsky District Куньинский район (Russian)
- District
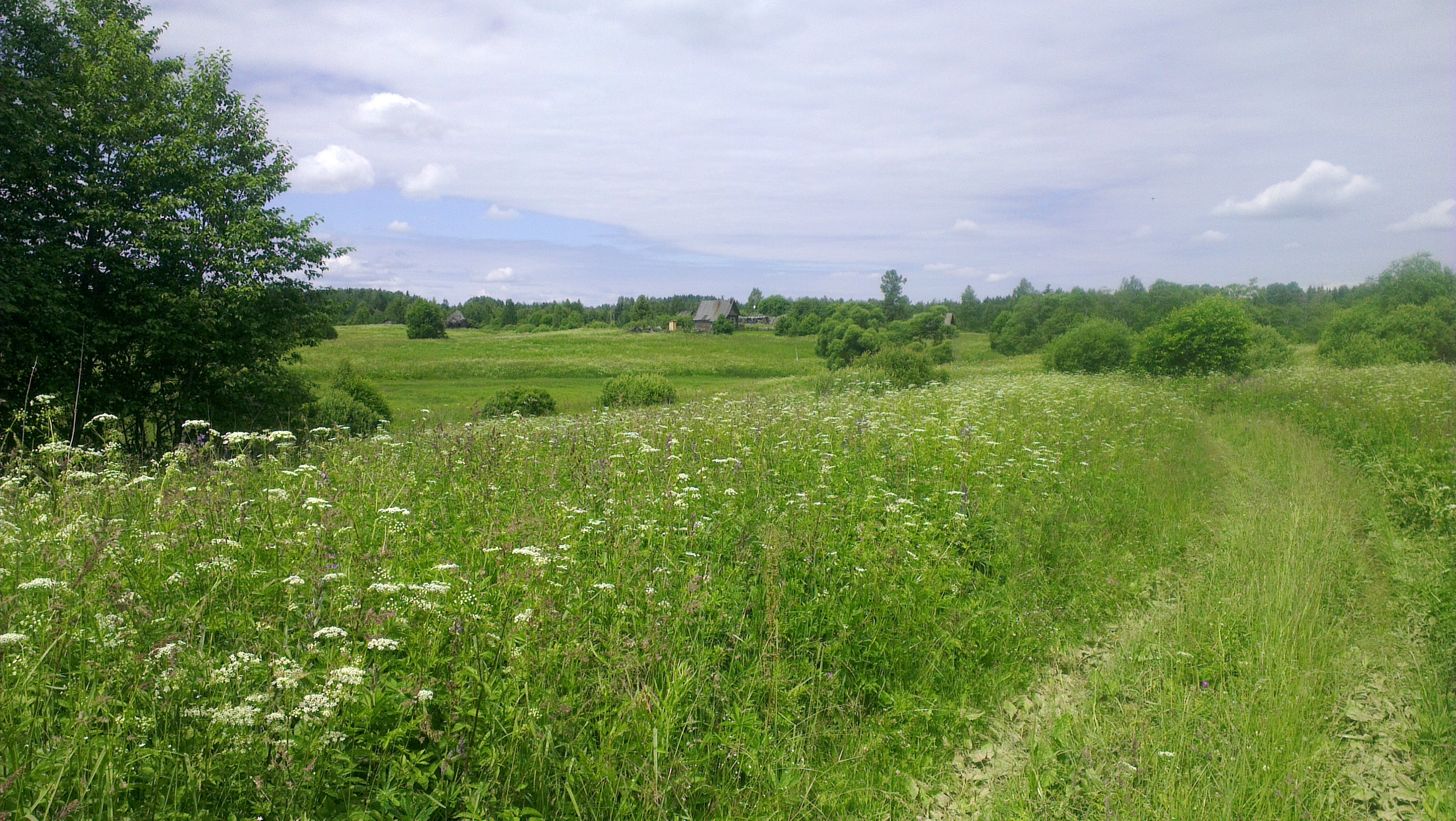
- Landscape in Kunyinsky District

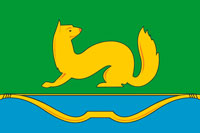
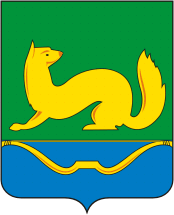
- Flag Coat of arms
- Location of Kunyinsky District in Pskov Oblast
- Coordinates: 56°17′N 30°58′E
- Country: Russia
- Federal subject: Pskov Oblast
- Established: 1927
- Administrative center: Kunya

Area
  - Total: 2,621.4 km^{2} (1,012.1 sq mi)

Population (2010 Census)
  - Total: 10,277
  - Density: 3.9204/km^{2} (10.154/sq mi)
  - Urban: 30.4%
  - Rural: 69.6%

Administrative structure
  - Inhabited localities: 1 urban-type settlements, 260 rural localities

Municipal structure
  - Municipally incorporated as: Kunyinsky Municipal District
  - Municipal divisions: 1 urban settlements, 8 rural settlements
- Time zone: UTC+3 (MSK)
- OKTMO ID: 58616000
- Website: http://kunja.reg60.ru/

Kunyinsky District (Russian: Ку́ньинский райо́н) is an administrative and municipal district (raion), one of the twenty-four in Pskov Oblast, Russia. It is located in the southeast of the oblast and borders with Toropetsky District of Tver Oblast in the north, Zapadnodvinsky District of Tver Oblast in the east, Velizhsky District of Smolensk Oblast in the south, Usvyatsky District in the southwest, and Velikoluksky District in the northwest. The area of the district is 2,621.4 square kilometers (1,012.1 sq mi). Its administrative center is the urban locality (a work settlement) of Kunya. Population: 10,277 (2010 census); 12,928 (2002 Census); 17,698 (1989 Soviet census). The population of Kunya accounts for 30.4% of the district's total population.

== Geography ==
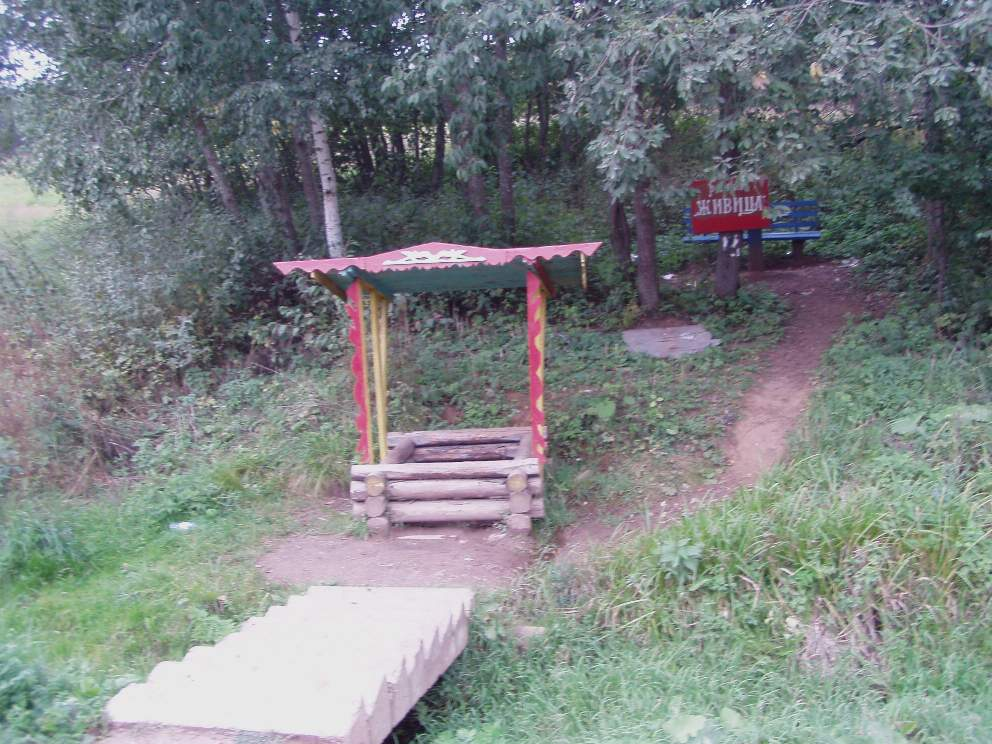
Spring in the village of Gruzdovo

The district is divided between the drainage basins of the Neva River and the Western Dvina River. The Western Dvina makes the southeastern border of the district, separating it from Tver Oblast. The rivers in the east and in the south of the district flow to the Western Dvina. The biggest of them are the Zhizhitsa River and the Usvyacha River. The two big lakes in the district, Lake Zhizhitskoye and Lake Dvinye-Velinskoye, which are two biggest lakes of Pskov Oblast after Lake Peipus, also belong to the basin of the Western Dvina. The western and the northern parts of the district belong to the Kunya River, a right tributary of the Lovat River, in the Neva river basin.

== History ==
The Lovat River was a part of the trade route from the Varangians to the Greeks, one of the oldest trading routes passing through Rus'. One of the versions of this trade route followed passed the Kunya and Zhizhitsa Rivers. The area was populated since the Middle Ages. In the 14th century, the northern part of what is now Kunyinsky District belonged to the Principality of Toropets, whereas the southern part joined the Grand Duchy of Lithuania. Subsequently, the northern part was included into the Grand Duchy of Moscow, and the southern part moved to Poland and remained there until the First Partition of Poland in 1772.

In the course of the administrative reform carried out in 1708 by Peter the Great, the north of the area was included into Ingermanland Governorate (known since 1710 as Saint Petersburg Governorate). In 1727, separate Novgorod Governorate was split off, and in 1772, Pskov Governorate (which between 1777 and 1796 existed as Pskov Viceroyalty) was established. The northern part of the contemporary Kunyinsky District was split between Velikoluksky and Toropetsky Uyezds of Pskov Governorate.

On August 1, 1927, the uyezds were abolished, and Kunyinsky District was established, with the administrative center in the settlement of Kunya. It included parts of former Velikoluksky and Toropetsky Uyezds. Pskov Governorate was abolished as well, and the district became a part of Velikiye Luki Okrug of Leningrad Oblast. On June 17, 1929, the district was transferred to Western Oblast. On July 23, 1930, the okrugs were also abolished and the districts were directly subordinated to the oblast. On January 1, 1932 the district was abolished and split between Toropetsky, Velikoluksky, and Ilyinsky Districts. On February 10, 1935, the district was re-established as a part of Velikiye Luki Okrug of Kalinin Oblast, one of the okrugs abutting the state boundaries of the Soviet Union. On May 4, 1938, the district was subordinated directly to the oblast. Between August 1941 and January 1942, Kunyinsky District was occupied by German troops. On August 22, 1944, the district was transferred to newly established Velikiye Luki Oblast. On October 2, 1957, Velikiye Luki Oblast was abolished, and Kunyinsky District was transferred to Pskov Oblast. On February 1, 1963 the district was abolished and merged into Velikoluksky District; on January 12, 1965 it was re-established. On March 2, 1966 Kunya was granted urban-type settlement status.

The southern part of the area in 1772 was included into newly established Pskov Governorate. In 1777, it was transferred to Polotsk Viceroyalty. In 1796, the viceroyalty was abolished and the area was transferred to Belarus Governorate; since 1802 to Vitebsk Governorate. After 1919, Vitebsk Governorate was a part of Russian Soviet Federative Socialist Republic. In 1924, Vitebsk Governorate was abolished, and Velizhsky Uyezd was transferred to Pskov Governorate.

On August 1, 1927, Usmynsky District with the administrative center in the selo of Usmyn was created on the territories which previously belonged to Nevelsky and Toropetsky Uyezds. It was a part of Velikiye Luki Okrug of Leningrad Oblast. On June 17, 1929, the district was transferred to Western Oblast, and on September 20, 1930, Usmynsky District was abolished and split between Velizhsky and Usvyatsky Districts. On March 10, 1945, it was re-established as Prikhabsky District, with the administrative center in the selo of Prikhaby, a part of Velikiye Luki Oblast, from the areas belonging to Usvyatsky and Kunyinsky Districts. In March 1949 the administrative center of the district was moved to Usmyn, and the district renamed Usmynsky. On October 2, 1957, the district was transferred to Pskov Oblast. On October 3, 1959, Usmynsky District was abolished and merged into Kunyinsky District.

== Economy ==
=== Industry ===
Industry in the district is represented by two bakeries located in Kunya.

=== Agriculture ===
The main specialization of agriculture in the district is meat and milk production. As of 2009, eight large- and mid-scale farms were operating in the district.

=== Transportation ===
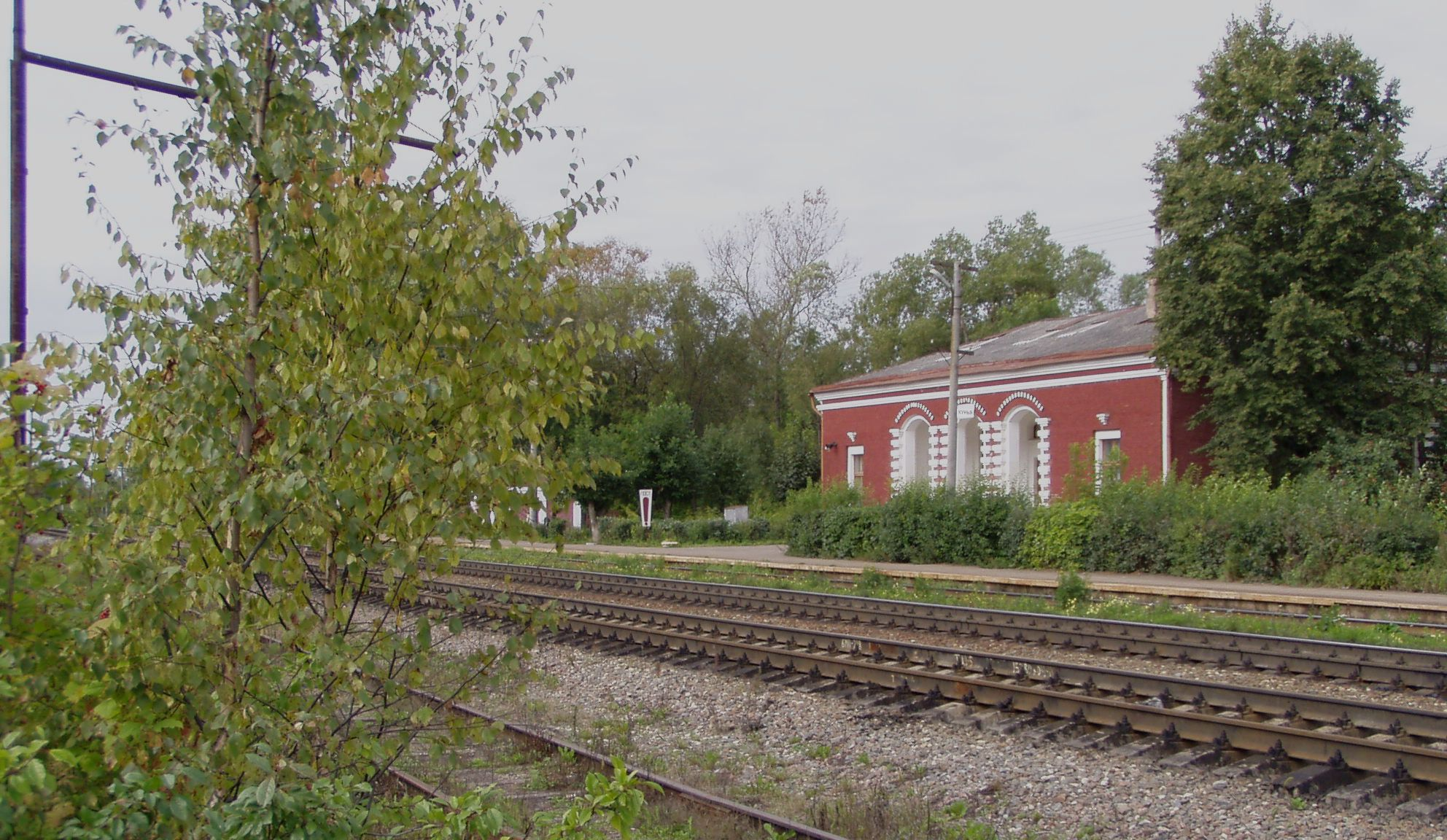
Kunya railway station

Two railroads cross the district. One railway connects Moscow via Velikiye Luki with Riga. Another railway, running to the northwest, connects Velikiye Luki via Toropets and Ostashkov with Bologoye.

The M9 highway which connects Moscow and Riga crosses the district from east to west, bypassing Kunya. Kunya is connected by road with Usvyaty. There are also local roads.

== Culture and recreation ==
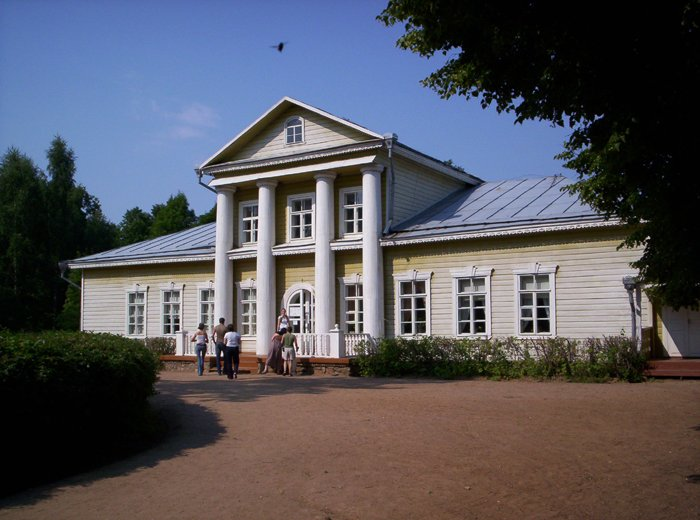
The Chirikov Estate, currently hosting the Modest Mussorgsky Museum Reserve

The district contains four objects classified as cultural and historical heritage of federal significance and 123 monuments of local significance. The federal monuments are the Chirikov Estate in the selo of Naumovo and an archeological site.

The Chirikov Estate belonged to the grandfather of the composer Modest Mussorgsky, and Mussorgsky often visited the estate. Currently the estate, which consists of the manor and the park with a pond, hosts the Modest Mussorgsky Museum Reserve, the only museum in the district.
