= Toropetsky District =

Toropetsky District Торопецкий район (Russian)
- District
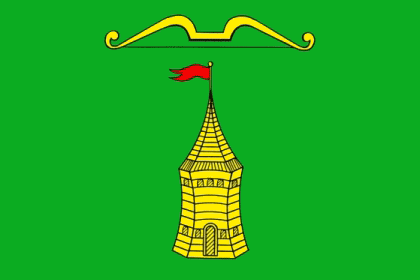
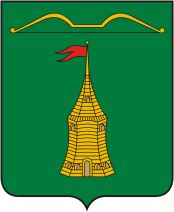
- Flag Coat of arms
- Location of Toropetsky District in Tver Oblast
- Coordinates: 56°30′N 31°38′E
- Country: Russia
- Federal subject: Tver Oblast
- Established: 1927
- Administrative center: Toropets

Area
  - Total: 3,373 km^{2} (1,302 sq mi)

Population (2010 Census)
  - Total: 20,526
  - Density: 6.085/km^{2} (15.76/sq mi)
  - Urban: 63.4%
  - Rural: 36.6%

Administrative structure
  - Administrative divisions: 1 Urban settlements, 8 Rural settlements
  - Inhabited localities: 1 cities/towns, 304 rural localities

Municipal structure
  - Municipally incorporated as: Toropetsky Municipal District
  - Municipal divisions: 1 urban settlements, 8 rural settlements
- Time zone: UTC+3 (MSK)
- OKTMO ID: 28655000
- Website: http://toropecadm.ru/

Toropetsky District (Russian: Торо́пецкий райо́н) is an administrative and municipal district (raion), one of the thirty-six in Tver Oblast, Russia. It is located in the west of the oblast and borders with Kholmsky District of Novgorod Oblast in the north, Andreapolsky District in the east, Zapadnodvinsky District in the south, Kunyinsky District of Pskov Oblast in the southwest, Velikoluksky District of Pskov Oblast in the west, and with Loknyansky District of Pskov Oblast in the northwest. The area of the district is 3,373 square kilometers (1,302 sq mi). Its administrative center is the town of Toropets. Population: 20,526 (2010 Census); 25,235 (2002 census); 31,228 (1989 Soviet census). The population of Toropets accounts for 63.4% of the district's total population.

== Geography ==
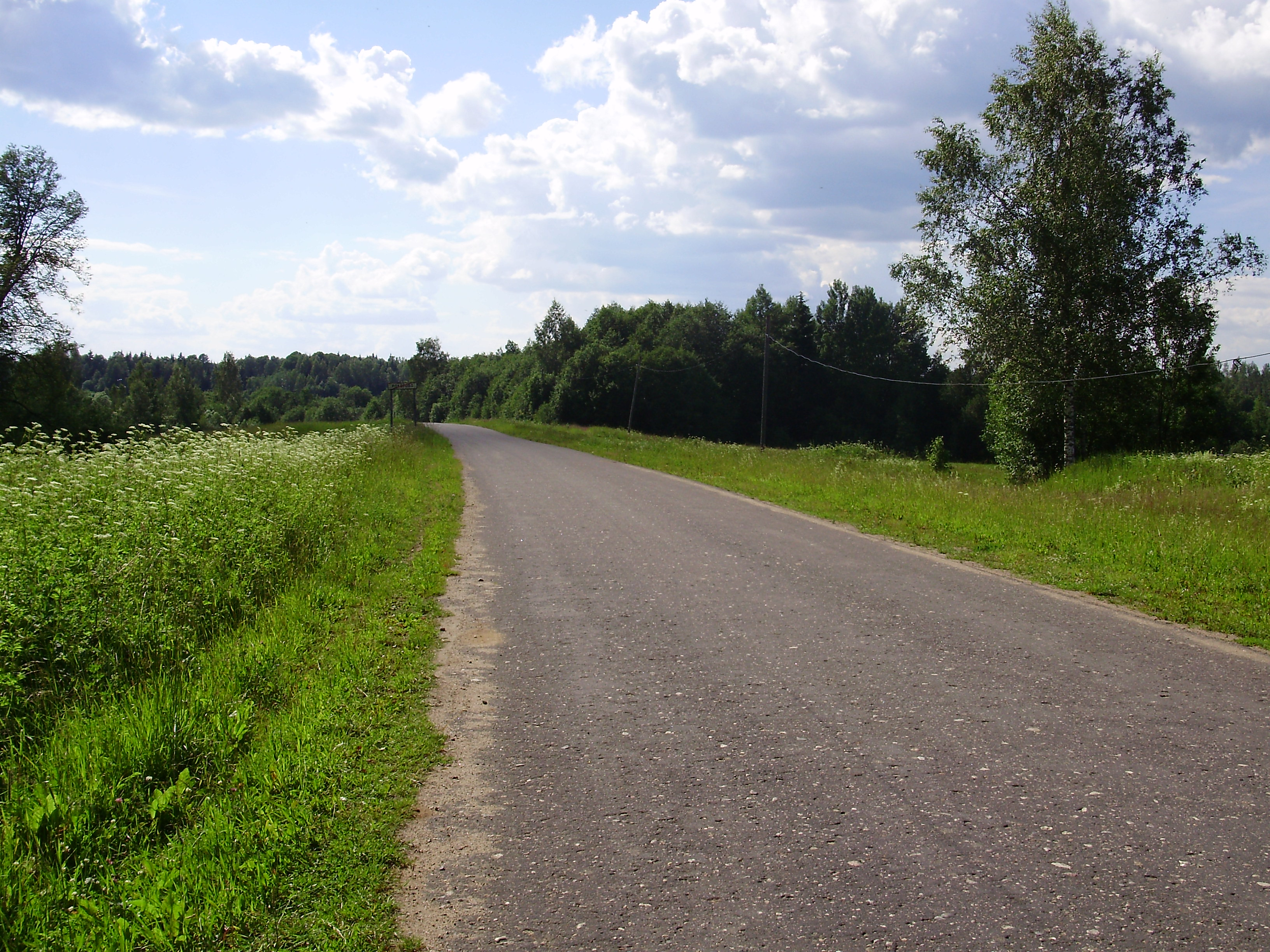
A road by the village of Rokotovo.

The area of the district is divided between the drainage basins of the Kunya River (a tributary of the Lovat River) and the Daugava River, known in Russia as the Western Dvina. It thus fully belongs to the drainage basin of the Baltic Sea. The rivers in the northern part of the district flow to the Kunya, which itself crosses the district. The principal tributaries of the Kunya within the district are the Oka and the Serezha (both right). The Western Dvina makes a stretch of the border with Zapadnodvinsky District; the biggest tributary within the district is the Toropa (right). Toropetsky District also contains the western part of the lake district south of the Valdai Hills. The biggest lakes within the district are Lake Kudinskoye and Lake Solomennoye.

== History ==
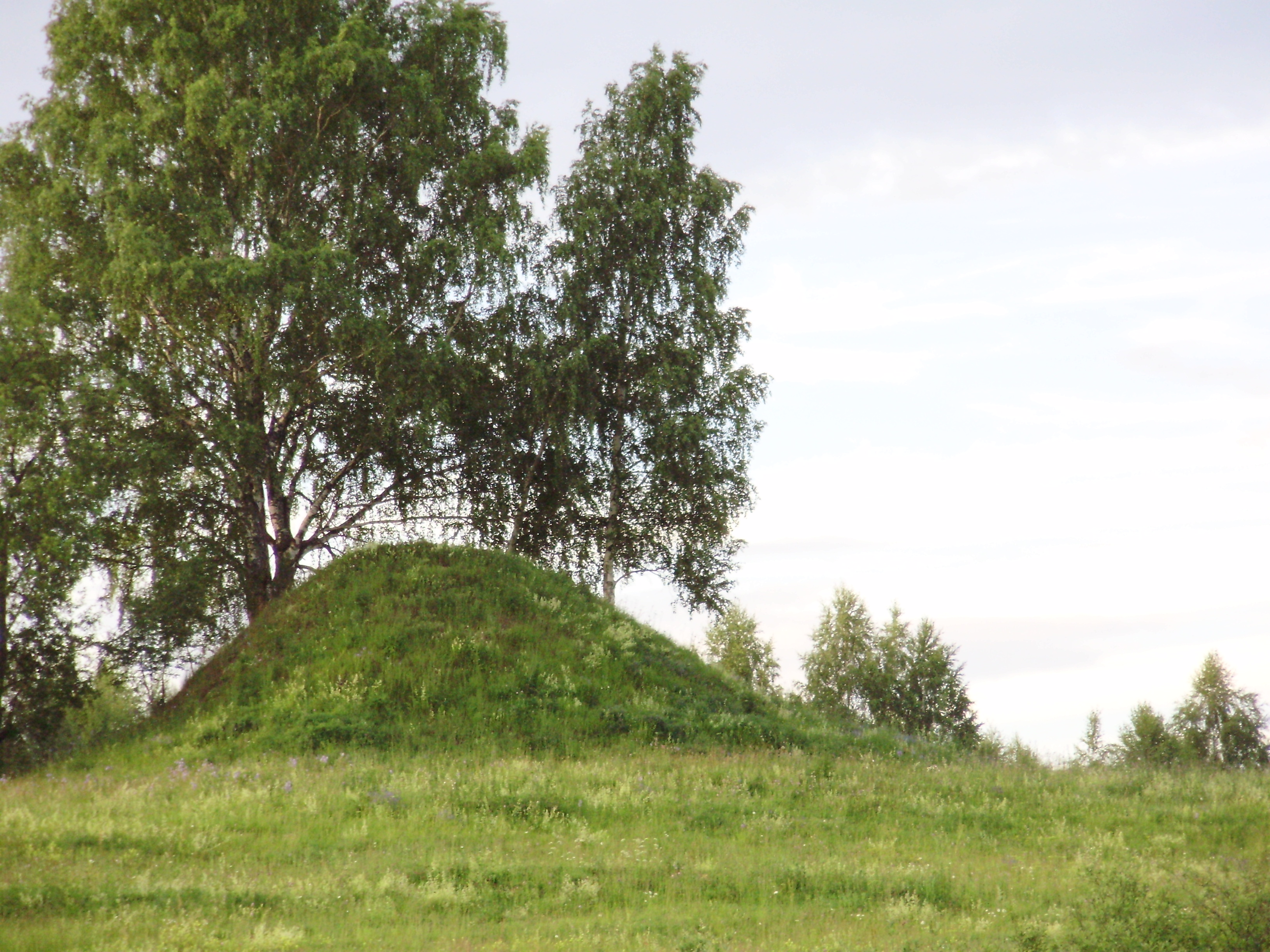
A tumulus

Presumably in 1167, Toropets became the center of the Principality of Toropets, which was subordinate to the Principality of Smolensk. The first prince of Toropets was Mstislav the Brave. In the 14th century, the area joined the Grand Duchy of Lithuania, and in the 16th century (most notably, after the Battle of Vedrosha, 1503) it moved to the Grand Duchy of Moscow. In the course of the administrative reform carried out in 1708 by Peter the Great, the area was included into Ingermanland Governorate (known since 1710 as Saint Petersburg Governorate). In 1727, separate Novgorod Governorate was split off. Toropets was included into Velikiye Luki Province. In 1772, as a result of the First Partition of Poland, Inflanty Voivodeship and eastern Belarus were transferred to Russia. In order to accommodate these areas, Pskov Governorate was created, and Velikiye Luki was transferred to Pskov Governorate. The town of Opochka was made the administrative center of the governorate. Pskov Governorate has proven to be too big to be administered properly, and in 1776, the decree of the empress, Catherine the Great, was issued. It divided the governorate into Pskov and Polotsk Governorates. Pskov was made the administrative center of Pskov Governorate, and the area remained in Pskov Governorate. In 1777, Pskov Governorate was transformed into Pskov Viceroyalty, which was administered from Novgorod by Jacob Sievers. In 1796, the viceroyalty was abolished, and on 31 December 1796 the emperor Paul I issued a decree restoring Pskov Governorate. The area belonged to Toropetsky Uyezd of Pskov Governorate.

On August 1, 1927, Pskov Governorate was abolished, and Leningrad Oblast was established. Toropetsky Uyezd was abolished as well, and Toropetsky District, with the administrative center in Toropets, was established. It belonged to Velikiye Luki Okrug of Leningrad Oblast. On June 17, 1929, the district was transferred to Western Oblast. On August 1, 1930, the okrugs were abolished, and the districts were subordinated directly to the oblast. On January 29, 1935 Kalinin Oblast was established, and Toropetsky District was transferred to Kalinin Oblast. Between Autumn 1941 and Winter 1942, during World War II, the district was occupied by German troops. On August 22, 1944, the district was transferred to newly established Velikiye Luki Oblast. On October 2, 1957, Velikiye Luki Oblast was abolished, and Toropetssky District was transferred back to Kalinin Oblast. In 1990, Kalinin Oblast was renamed Tver Oblast.

On August 1, 1927 Bologovsky District with the administrative center located in the selo of Bologovo was established as well. The district was a part of Velikiye Luki Okrug of Leningrad Oblast, and on June 17, 1929 with the rest of the okrug it was transferred to Western Oblast. On September 20, 1930 the district was abolished and split between Kholmsky and Leninsky Districts.

On June 1, 1936 Seryozhinsky District with the administrative center located in the selo of Bologovo was established. The district was a part of Kalinin Oblast. On August 23, 1944, it was transferred to Velikiye Luki Oblast, and on October 2, 1957, it was transferred back to Kalinin Oblast. On January 12, 1960, Seryozhinsky District was abolished and split between Leninsky and Toropetsky Districts.

Another district established on June 1, 1936 was Ploskoshsky District with the administrative center located in the selo of Ploskosh was established. The district was a part of Kalinin Oblast. On August 23, 1944, it was transferred to Velikiye Luki Oblast, and on October 2, 1957, it was transferred back to Pskov Oblast. On July 29, 1958, the district was transferred from Pskov to Kalinin oblast. On January 12, 1960, Ploskoshsky District was abolished and merged Toropetsky District.

In February 1963, during the abortive administrative reform by Nikita Khrushchev, Leninsky District was merged into Toropetsky District. On January 12, 1965, Andreapolsky District was established in the areas which previously belonged to Toropetsky and Ostashkovsky Districts.

== Economy ==
=== Industry ===
There are enterprises of chemical, metallurgical, textile, and food industries, most of which are located in Toropets.

=== Agriculture ===
The main agricultural specialization of the district is cattle breeding with meat and milk production. There are also farms producing pork, as well as one farm raising weasels and sables for fur.

=== Transportation ===
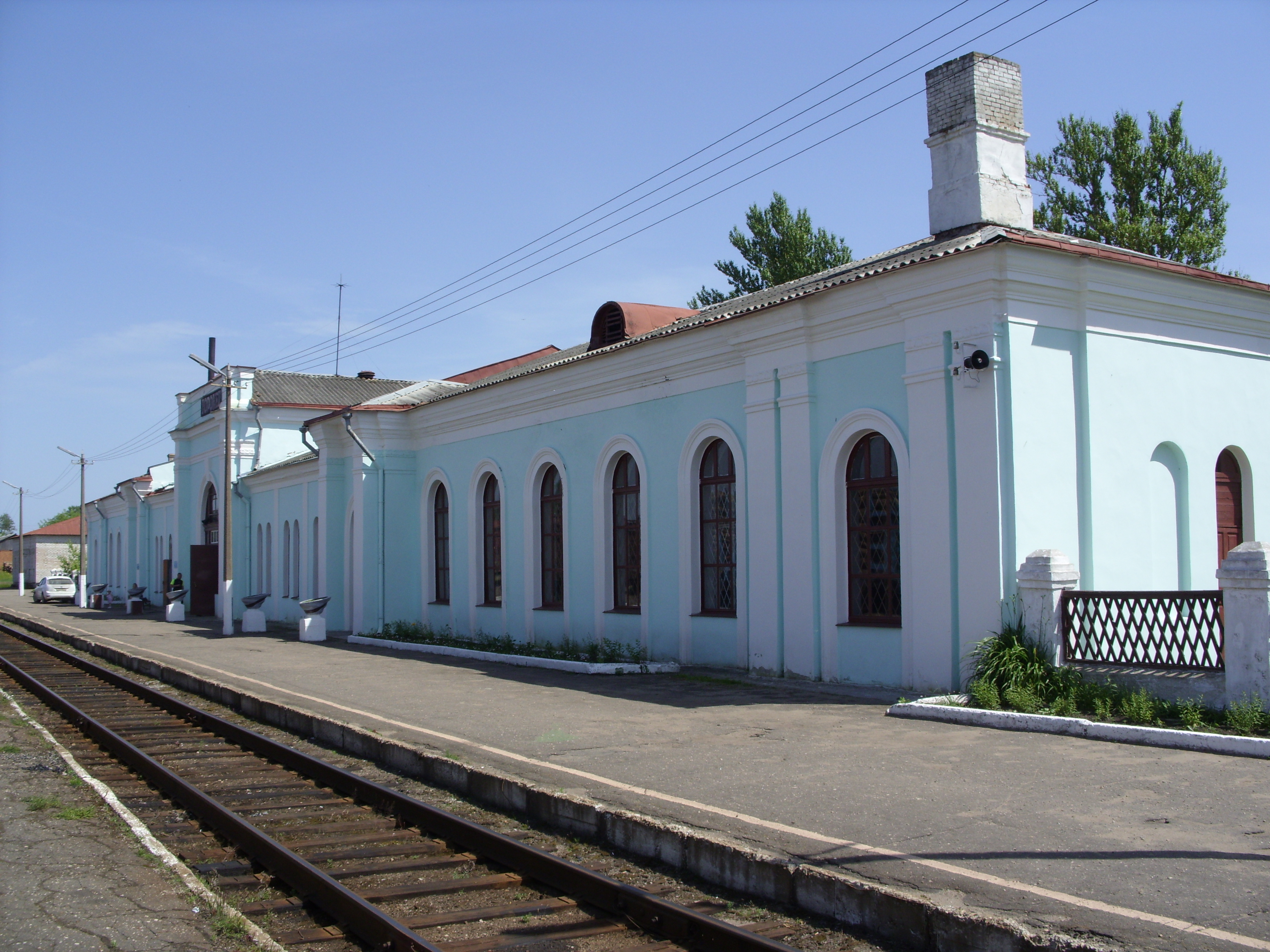
Toropets railway station

The railway connecting Bologoye with Velikiye Luki crosses the district from east to west. Toropets is the main railway station within the district. There is infrequent passenger traffic.

The M9 highway connecting Moscow with Riga also crosses the southern part of the district. A paved road branches off from M9, running via Toropets to Kholm and further to Staraya Russa.

== Culture and recreation ==
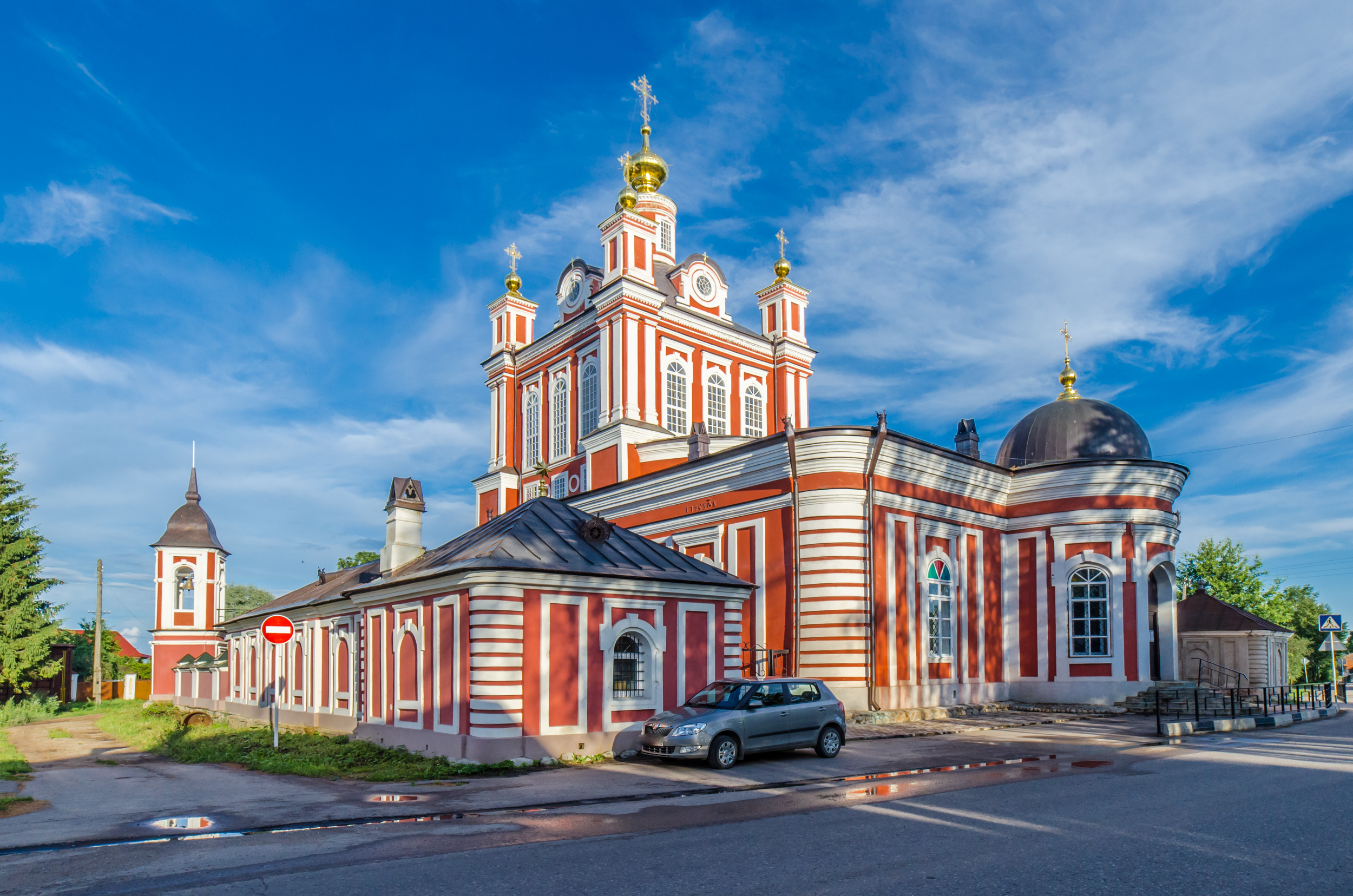
The Korsun Church (1795–1804), Toropets.

The district contains 98 cultural heritage monuments of federal significance (66 of them in Toropets) and additionally 68 objects classified as cultural and historical heritage of local significance (30 of them in Toropets). The federal monuments include plenty of buildings in the historical center of Toropets, as well as the Ascencion Church in the village of Baranets (19th century), the Dormition Church in the selo of Dopsho (1771), the Saint Nicholas Church in the selo of Metlino (18th century), the Saint Demetrius Church in the village of Nishevitsy (1765), the wooden Intercession Church in the selo of Pokrovskoye (19th century) as well as the ensembles of former estates in the selos of Mikhaylovskoye, Podgorodneye, Khvorostyevo, Chistoye, and Znamenskoye, and a number of archaeological monuments.

There are a number of museums in the district, which include the Toropets District Museum, the Museum of the History of Photography, the house-museum of Patriarch Tikhon (Tikhon, in the future the Patriarch of the Russian Orthodox Church, lived here as a child for ten years), all of them are located in Toropets. In the selo of Volok, there is a museum of Elizaveta Dmitriyeva-Tomanovskaya, a feminist and a secretary of Karl Marx.
