= Kholmsky District, Novgorod Oblast =

Kholmsky District Холмский район (Russian)
- District
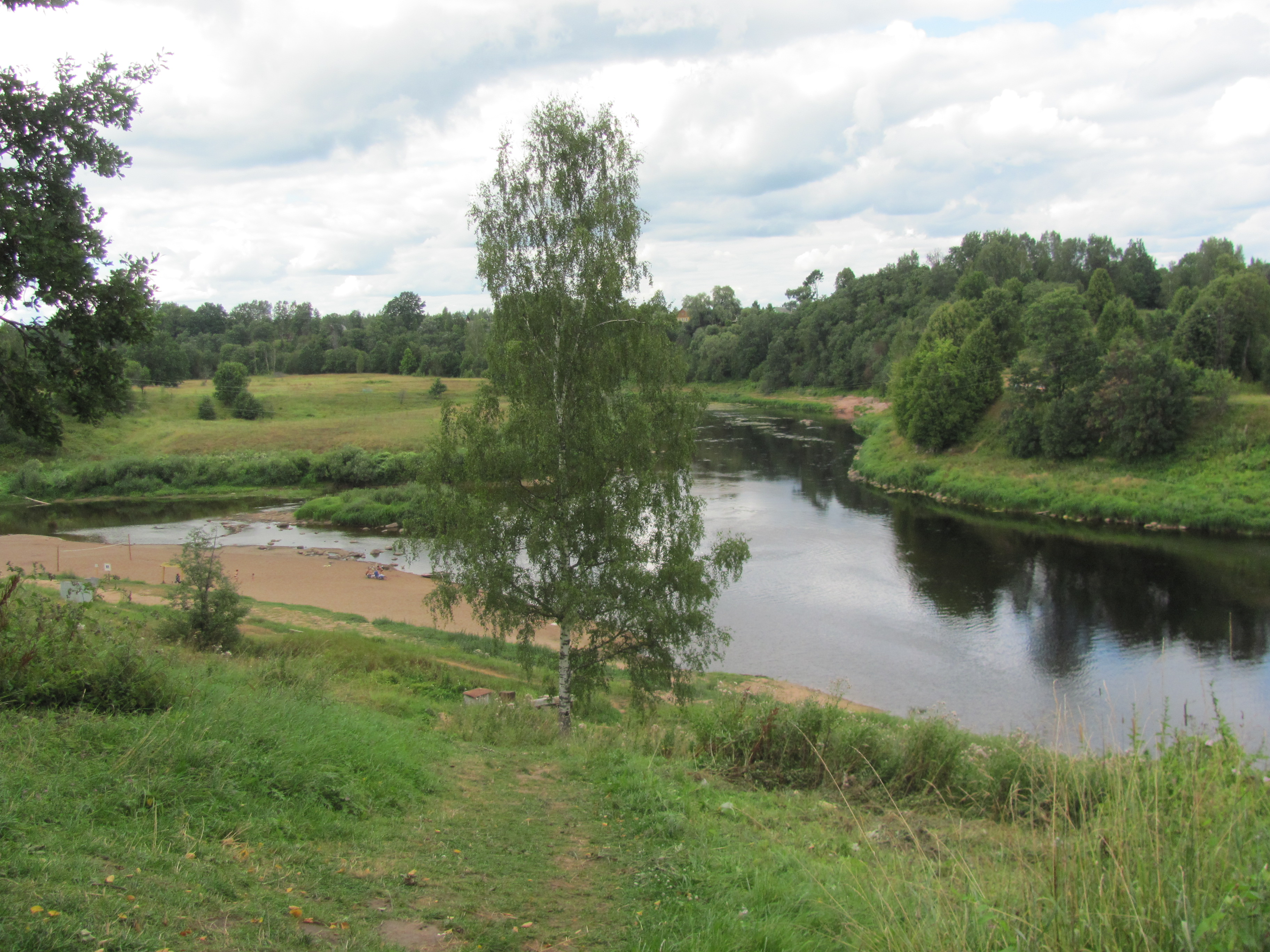
- The Lovat River in Kholm, Kholmsky District

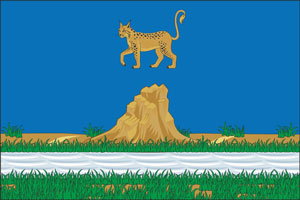
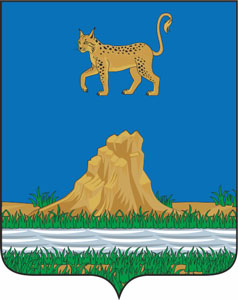
- Flag Coat of arms
- Location of Kholmsky District in Novgorod Oblast
- Coordinates: 57°09′N 31°11′E
- Country: Russia
- Federal subject: Novgorod Oblast
- Established: August 1, 1927
- Administrative center: Kholm

Area
  - Total: 2,178.69 km^{2} (841.20 sq mi)

Population (2010 Census)
  - Total: 6,177
  - Density: 2.835/km^{2} (7.343/sq mi)
  - Urban: 62.0%
  - Rural: 38.0%

Administrative structure
  - Administrative divisions: 1 Towns of district significance, 3 Settlements
  - Inhabited localities: 1 cities/towns, 135 rural localities

Municipal structure
  - Municipally incorporated as: Kholmsky Municipal District
  - Municipal divisions: 1 urban settlements, 3 rural settlements
- Time zone: UTC+3 (MSK)
- OKTMO ID: 49647000
- Website: http://www.holmadmin.net/

Kholmsky District (Russian: Хо́лмский райо́н) is an administrative and municipal district (raion), one of the twenty-one in Novgorod Oblast, Russia. It is located in the south of the oblast and borders with Poddorsky District in the north, Maryovsky District in the east, Andreapolsky District of Tver Oblast in the southeast, Toropetsky District of Tver Oblast in the south, Loknyansky District of Pskov Oblast in the southwest, and with Bezhanitsky District of Pskov Oblast in the northwest. The area of the district is 2,178.69 square kilometers (841.20 sq mi). Its administrative center is the town of Kholm. Population: 6,177 (2010 census); 7,712 (2002 Census); 9,174 (1989 Soviet census). The population of Kholm accounts for 62.0% of the district's total population.

== Geography ==
The whole of the district lies in the basin of the Lovat River. The Lovat crosses the district from south to north. The main tributary of the Lovat within the district is the Kunya (right). The town of Kholm is located at the confluence of the Lovat and the Kunya. The western part of the district is occupied by the Polist-Lovat Swamp System located at the border between the basins of the Lovat and the Polist Rivers. In the middle of the swamp, in the northwestern corner of the district, there is Lake Rdeyskoye, the biggest lake in the district and the source of the Redya River, a major left tributary of the Lovat. The Polist-Lovat Swamp System is protected as the Rdeysky Nature Reserve, which is shared between Kholmsky and Poddorsky Districts. 72% of the district's territory is covered by forests.

== History ==
The Lovat River was a part of the trade route from the Varangians to the Greeks, one of the oldest trading routes passing through Rus'. Kholm was first mentioned in an 1144 chronicle as Kholmsky Pogost. It was completely destroyed during the Livonian War of 1580-1581, but founded again at the same location in the 18th century. In the course of the administrative reform carried out in 1708 by Peter the Great, the area was included into Ingermanland Governorate (known since 1710 as Saint Petersburg Governorate). In 1727, separate Novgorod Governorate was split off. Kholm was included into Velikiye Luki Province. In 1777, Kholm was chartered and became the seat of Pskov Viceroyalty (from 1796—of Pskov Governorate).

On August 1, 1927, Pskov Governorate and its uyezds were abolished, and Kholmsky District was established as a part of Velikiye Luki Okrug of Leningrad Oblast, with the administrative center in the town of Kholm. The district included parts of the former Kholmsky Uyezd. On June 3, 1929, Kholmsky District was transferred to Velikiye Luki Okrug of Western Oblast. On July 23, 1930, the okrugs were abolished, and the districts were directly subordinated to the oblast. On January 29, 1935, the district was transferred to Kalinin Oblast. Between August 1941 and spring of 1944, the area of the district was occupied by German troops. It was the scene of the Kholm Pocket from January 21 to May 5, 1942. On July 5, 1944, the district was transferred into newly established Novgorod Oblast, but already on August 22, 1944 it was transferred to newly established Velikiye Luki Oblast. On October 2, 1957, Velikiye Luki Oblast was abolished, and Kholmsky District was transferred to Pskov Oblast. On July 29, 1958, it was transferred back to Novgorod Oblast and remained there ever since.

On August 1, 1927 Troitsky District was established as well. It included parts of former Velikoluksky and Kholmsky Uyezds, and the administrative center of the district was located in the selo of Troitsa-Khlavitsa. The district was a part of Velikiye Luki Okrug of Leningrad Oblast, and on June 17, 1929 with the rest of the okrug it was transferred to Western Oblast. In August 1930, the district was renamed Lovatsky. On September 20, 1930 the district was abolished and split between Kholmsky and Loknyansky Districts.

Another district established on August 1, 1927 was Bologovsky District with the administrative center located in the selo of Bologovo. The district was a part of Velikiye Luki Okrug of Leningrad Oblast, and on June 17, 1929 with the rest of the okrug it was transferred to Western Oblast. On September 20, 1930 the district was abolished and split between Kholmsky and Leninsky Districts.

On March 10, 1945, Podberezinsky District with the administrative center in the selo of Podberezye was established. It included parts of Loknyansky, Kholmsky, and Ploskoshsky Districts. The district was a part of Velikiye Luki Oblast. On October 2, 1957, the district was transferred to Pskov Oblast. On January 14, 1958, the district was abolished and split between Kholmsky, Loknyansky, Velikoluksky, and Ploskoshsky Districts.

== Economy ==
=== Industry ===
The economy of the district is based on timber industry, which makes up 90% of its gross product.

=== Agriculture ===
As of 2011, there were twenty-three large- and mid-scale farms in the district. Agriculture specializes mainly in cattle breeding as well as crops and potato growing.

=== Transportation ===
Kholm is connected by roads to Staraya Russa, to Bezhanitsy, to Demyansk via Maryovo, and to Toropets.

The Lovat is not navigable within the limits of the district.

== Culture and recreation ==
The district contains eighty monuments classified as cultural and historical heritage of local significance. Most of these are archaeological sites and graves of soldiers fallen in World War II.

Rdeysky Monastery is a notable monument located on the eastern shore of Lake Rdeyskoye. It was founded not later that the 17th century and abolished in the 1930s. There are no roads leading to the monastery and no villages close to it, and the ensemble of the monastery remains an attraction albeit one which is difficult to reach.

Kholm hosts the Kholm District Museum which was opened in 1983.
