= Velikoluksky District =

Velikoluksky District Великолукский район (Russian)
- District
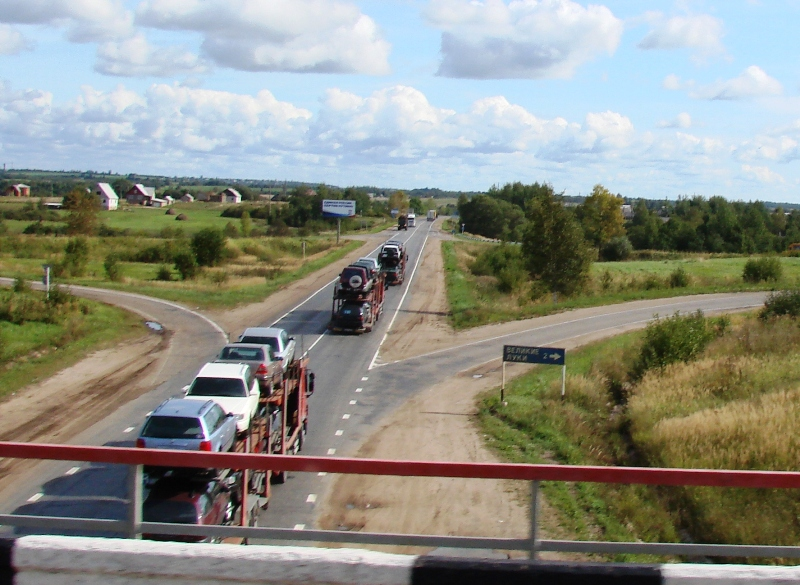
- The Baltic Highway in Velikoluksky District

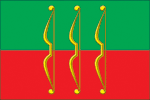
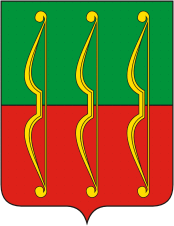
- Flag Coat of arms
- Location of Velikoluksky District in Pskov Oblast
- Coordinates: 56°20′N 30°32′E
- Country: Russia
- Federal subject: Pskov Oblast
- Established: 9 September 1927
- Administrative center: Velikiye Luki

Area
  - Total: 2,960 km^{2} (1,140 sq mi)

Population (2010 Census)
  - Total: 22,121
  - Density: 7.47/km^{2} (19.4/sq mi)
  - Urban: 0%
  - Rural: 100%

Administrative structure
  - Inhabited localities: 452 rural localities

Municipal structure
  - Municipally incorporated as: Velikoluksky Municipal District
  - Municipal divisions: 0 urban settlements, 11 rural settlements
- Time zone: UTC+3 (MSK)
- OKTMO ID: 58606000
- Website: http://vlukirajon.reg60.ru/

Velikoluksky District (Russian: Великолу́кский райо́н) is an administrative and municipal district (raion), one of the twenty-four in Pskov Oblast, Russia. It is located in the southeast of the oblast and borders with Loknyansky District in the north, Toropetsky District of Tver Oblast in the northeast, Kunyinsky District in the east, Usvyatsky District in the south, Nevelsky District in the southwest, and with Novosokolnichesky District in the west. The area of the district is 2,960 square kilometers (1,140 sq mi). Its administrative center is the town of Velikiye Luki (which is not administratively a part of the district). Population: 22,121 (2010 census); 24,035 (2002 Census); 31,911 (1989 Soviet census).

== Geography ==
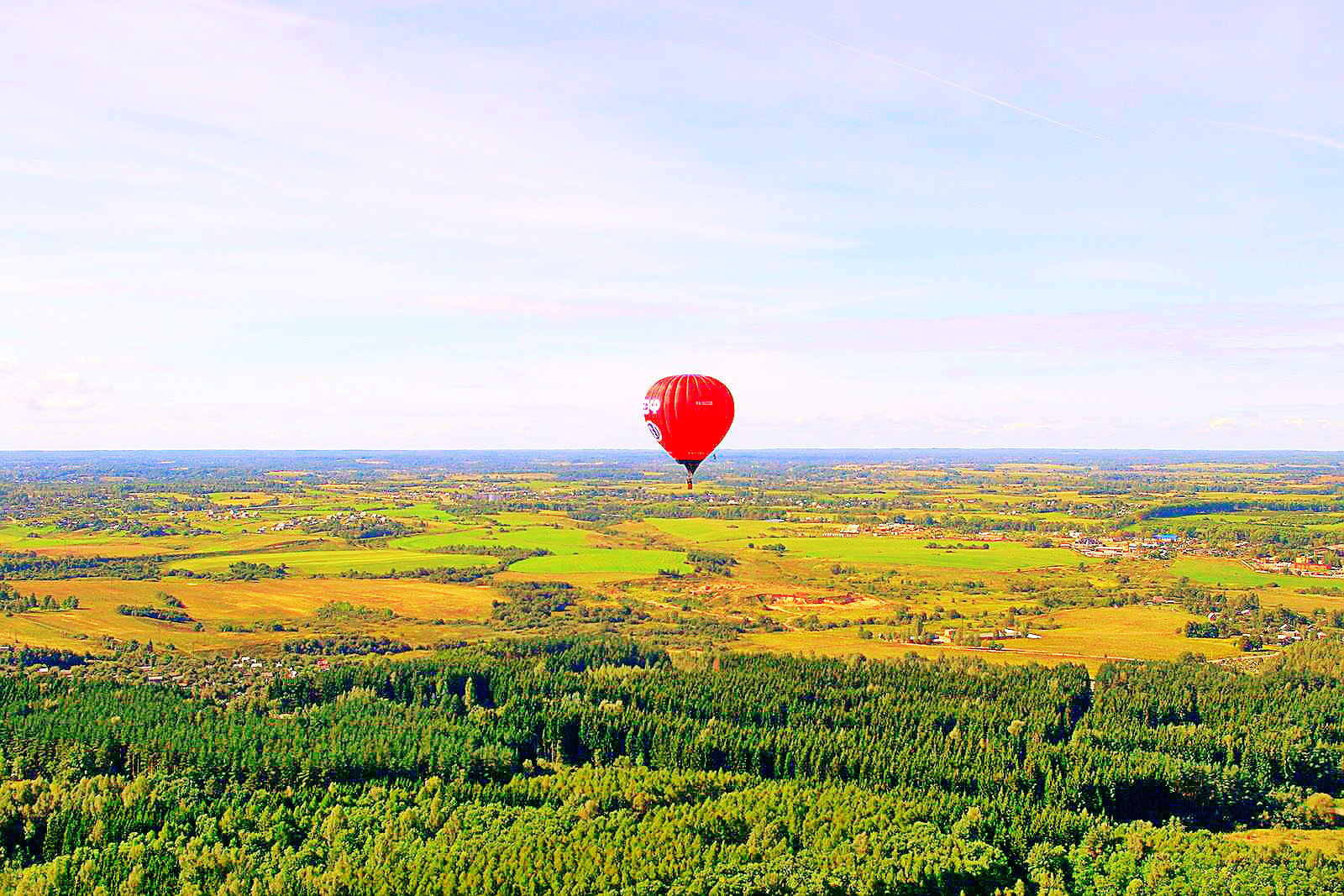
Panorama of the district

The district is elongated from north to south and lies completely in the basin of the Lovat River, which crosses it from south to north. The biggest tributary of the Lovat within the limits of the district is the Kunya River. The northern part of the district is a flat depression, whereas the southern one is a hilly plain of glacial origin, filled with lakes, the biggest of which is Lake Uritskoye.

== History ==
The Lovat River was a part of the trade route from the Varangians to the Greeks, one of the oldest trading routes passing through Rus'. The area was populated since the Middle Ages and Velikiye Luki was first mentioned in the chronicles under 1166. It was a part of the Novgorod Republic and had a strategic importance, defending Novgorod and Pskov from the south. In the end of the 15th century, Velikiye Luki was included into the Grand Duchy of Moscow. In the course of the administrative reform carried out in 1708 by Peter the Great, it was included into Ingermanland Governorate (known since 1710 as Saint Petersburg Governorate). In 1727, separate Novgorod Governorate was split off, and in 1772, Pskov Governorate (which between 1777 and 1796 existed as Pskov Viceroyalty) was established. The area was a part of Velikoluksky and Toropetsky Uyezds of Pskov Governorate.

On August 1, 1927, the uyezds were abolished, and Velikoluksky District was established, with the administrative center in the town of Velikiye Luki. It included parts of former Velikoluksky and Toropetsky Uyezds. Pskov Governorate was abolished as well, and the district became a part of Velikiye Luki Okrug of Leningrad Oblast. On June 17, 1929, the district was transferred to Western Oblast. On July 23, 1930, the okrugs were also abolished and the districts were directly subordinated to the oblast. On January 29, 1935, the district was transferred to Kalinin Oblast, and on February 5 of the same year, Velikoluksky District became a part of Velikiye Luki Okrug of Kalinin Oblast, one of the okrugs abutting the state boundaries of the Soviet Union. On May 4, 1938, the district was subordinated directly to the oblast. Between 1941 and 1944, Velikoluksky District was occupied by German troops. On August 22, 1944, the district was transferred to newly established Velikiye Luki Oblast. On October 2, 1957, Velikiye Luki Oblast was abolished and Velikoluksky District was transferred to Pskov Oblast.

On August 1, 1927, Porechyevsky District with the administrative center in the selo of Porechye was created on the territories which previously belonged to Nevelsky Uyezd. It was a part of Velikiye Luki Okrug of Leningrad Oblast. On June 17, 1929, the district was transferred to Western Oblast, and on September 20, 1930, Porechyevsky District was abolished and split between Velikoluksky, Nevelsky, and Usvyatsky Districts. On March 10, 1945, it was re-established as Porechensky District, a part of Velikiye Luki Oblast, from the areas belonging to Velikoluksky and Nevelsky Districts. On October 2, 1957, the district was transferred to Pskov Oblast. On March 23, 1959, Porechensky District was abolished and merged into Velikoluksky District.

Another district established on August 1, 1927 was Nasvinsky District, with the administrative center in the settlement of Nasva. It included parts of former Velikoluksky Uyezd. The district was a part of Velikiye Luki Okrug of Leningrad Oblast. On June 17, 1929 the district was transferred to Western Oblast. On January 1, 1932, Nasvinsky District was abolished and split between Loknyansky, Velikoluksky, and Novosokolnichesky Districts.

On March 10, 1945, Podberezinsky District with the administrative center in the selo of Podberezye was established. It included parts of Loknyansky, Kholmsky, and Ploskoshsky Districts. The district was a part of Velikiye Luki Oblast. On October 2, 1957, the district was transferred to Pskov Oblast. On January 14, 1958, the district was abolished and split between Kholmsky, Loknyansky, Velikoluksky, and Ploskoshsky Districts.

== Administrative and municipal status ==
Within the framework of administrative divisions, Velikoluksky District is one of the twenty-four in the oblast. The town of Velikiye Luki serves as its administrative center, despite being incorporated separately as an administrative unit with the status equal to that of the districts.

As a municipal division, the district is incorporated as Velikoluksky Municipal District. The Town of Velikiye Luki is incorporated separately from the district as Velikiye Luki Urban Okrug.

== Economy ==
=== Agriculture ===
49% of the district's territory is occupied by agricultural lands. There are twenty-five large- and mid-size farms in the district. The main agricultural specializations in the district are cattle breeding with meat and milk production, poultry breeding with egg production, and potato and crops growing. Velikoluksky District produces more potatoes than any other district of Pskov Oblast.

=== Transportation ===
Velikiye Luki is an important railway hub and all four railway lines originating from Velikiye Luki cross Velikoluksky District. One railway connects Moscow via Velikiye Luki with Riga and runs in the east-west direction. Another railway, running to the northwest, connects Velikiye Luki via Toropets and Ostashkov with Bologoye. Yet another railway connects Velikiye Luki to Nevel, where it splits into two railway lines, both running southeast into Belarus: one line to Vitebsk, and another one to Grodno via Polotsk and Maladzyechna.

The M9 Highway, which connects Moscow and Riga, crosses the district from east to west. The roads connecting Velikiye Luki with Novosokolniki, with Nevel, and with Porkhov via Loknya all cross the district. There are also local roads.

== Culture and recreation ==
The district contains 11 objects classified as cultural and historical heritage of federal significance and 132 monuments of local significance. The federal monuments are the Korvin-Krukovsky Estate in the village of Polibino and ten archeological sites.

The two museums located in the district are the Ivan Vasilyev Museum of history of Great Patriotic War in Borki, and the Sofia Kovalevskaya Museum, located in the village of Polibino in the former Korvin-Krukovsky Estate, where Sofia Kovalevskaya was born.
