= Kunya (river) =

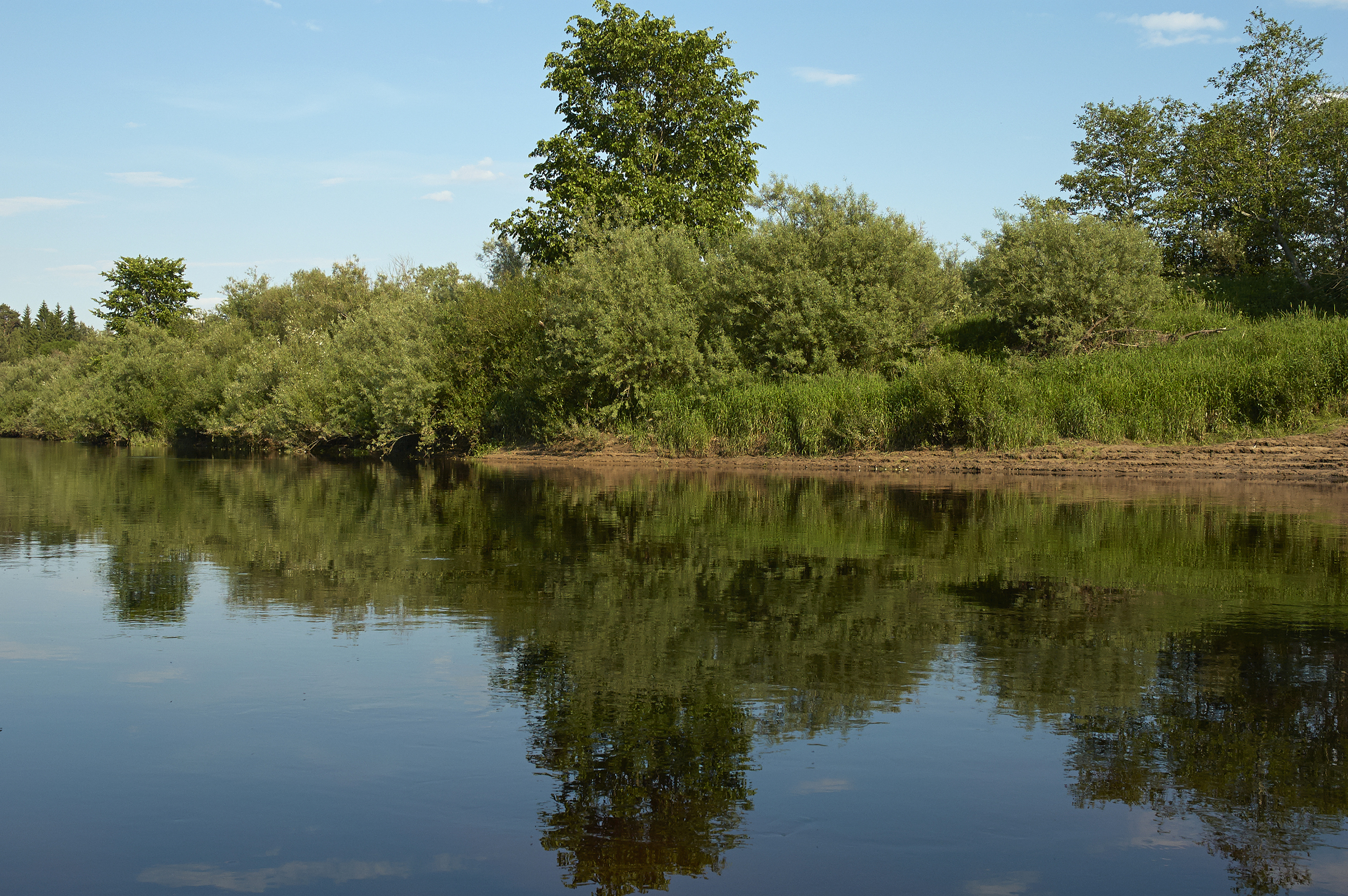

Location
- Country: Russia

Physical characteristics
- Source
  - location: Vsteselovo Lake
- Mouth: Lovat
  - coordinates: 57°08′48″N 31°09′58″E
- Length: 258 km (160 mi)
- Basin size: 5,143 km^{2} (1,986 sq mi)
- Discharge
  - average: 44.8 m^{3}/s (1,580 cu ft/s)

Basin features
- Progression: Lovat→ Lake Ilmen→ Volkhov→ Lake Ladoga→ Neva→ Gulf of Finland

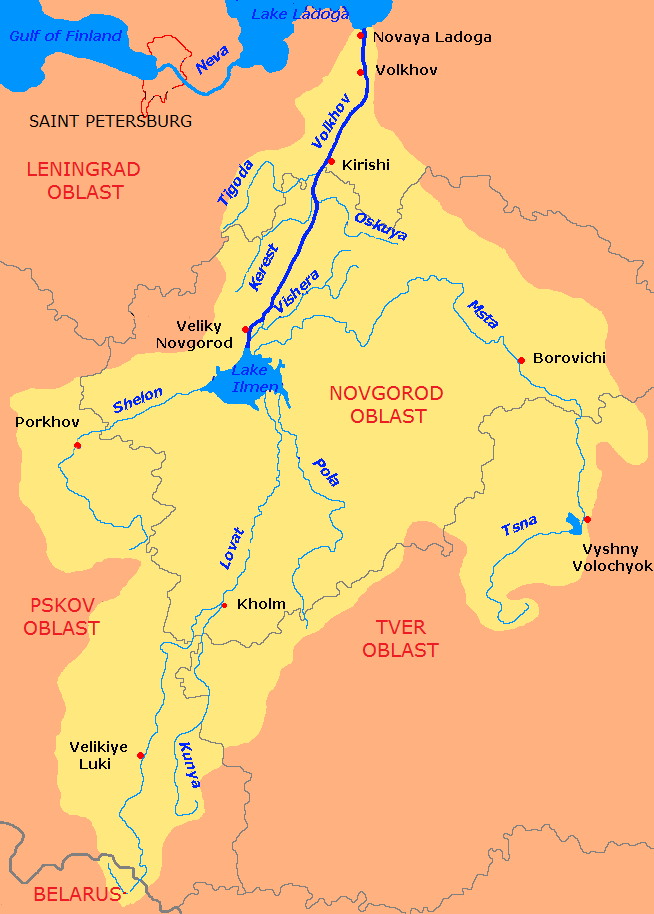
The Volkhov River drainage basin. The Kunya is shown on the map.

The Kunya (Russian: Ку́нья) is a river in Kunyinsky, Velikoluksky, and Loknyansky Districts of Pskov Oblast, Toropetsky District of Tver Oblast, and Kholmsky District of Novgorod Oblast in Russia. It is a major right tributary of the Lovat. It is 258 kilometres (160 mi) long, and the area of its basin 5,143 square kilometres (1,986 sq mi). The town of Kholm is located on the mouth of the Kunya. The principal tributaries of the Kunya are the Oka, the Serezha, the Maly Tuder, and the Bolshoy Tuder (all from the right).

The source of the Kunya is in Lake Vsteselovo in the central part of Kunyinsky District, in the southeast of Pskov Oblast. It flows out of the lake in the southern direction and gradually makes a U-turn and turns north. Some stretches of the Kunya make the border between Kunyinsky and Velikoluksky Districts, and, more to the north, between Velikoluksky District and Tver Oblast. North of the village of Chaltsevo, the border between the oblasts turns west, and the Kunya continues north and enters Toropetsky District of Tver Oblast. The Kunya accepts the Serezha from the right and a short stretch of it forms the border between Pskov and Tver Oblasts again. North of this stretch, at the triple point, the Kunya enters Novgorod Oblast and turns northeast. The mouth of the Kunya is located in the town of Kholm.

The drainage basin of the Kunya includes areas around the triple point of Novgorod, Tver, and Pskov Oblasts: the northern part of Kunyinsky District, the northwestern part of Velikoluksky District, the southern part of Kholmsky District, as well as much of Toropetsky and Andreapolsky Districts. The urban-type settlement of Kunya lies within the drainage basin of the Kunya, but not on the banks of the river.
