= Lake Zhizhitskoye =

Lake in Pskov Oblast, Russia

- Жижицкое озеро (Russian)
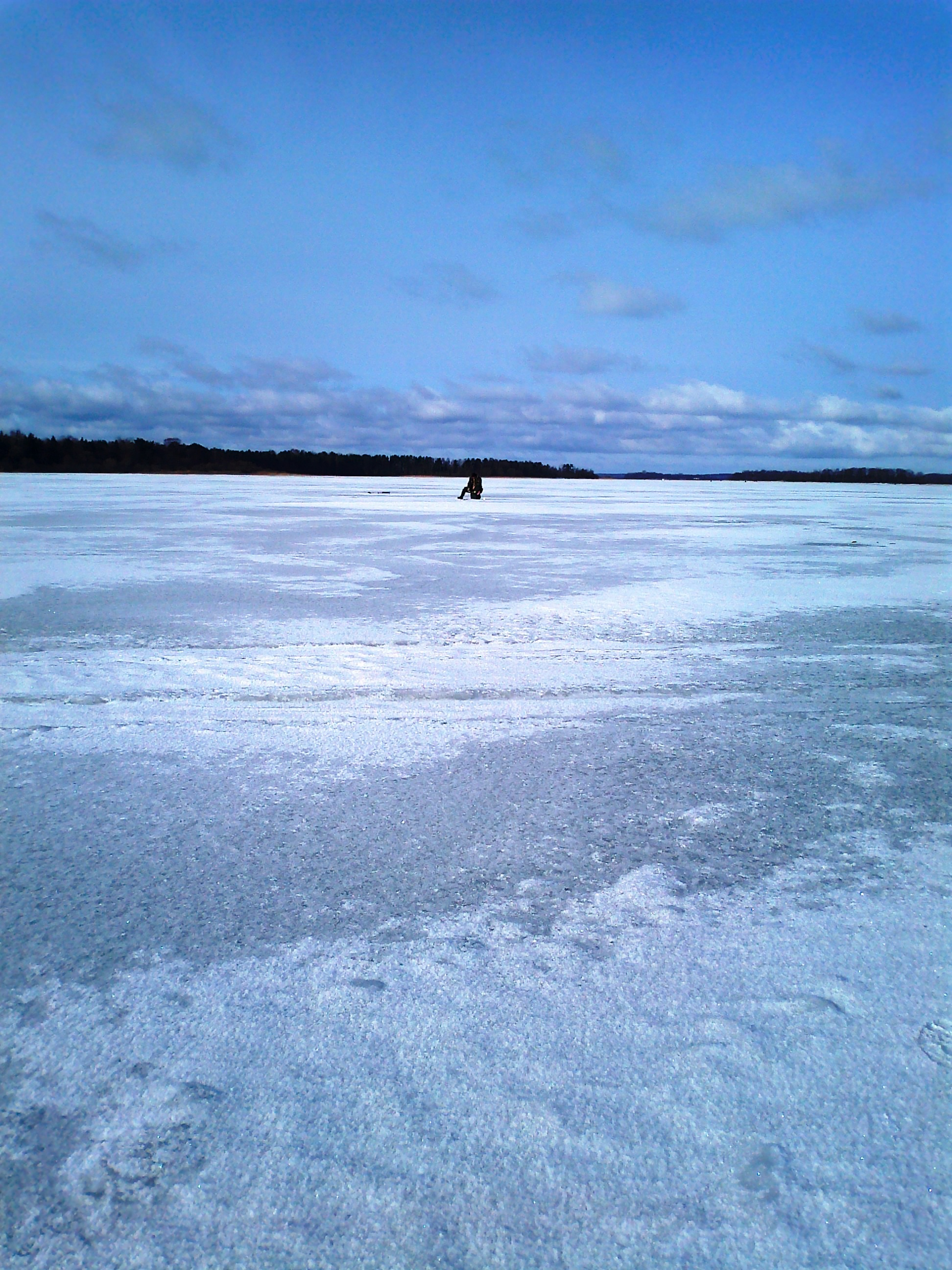

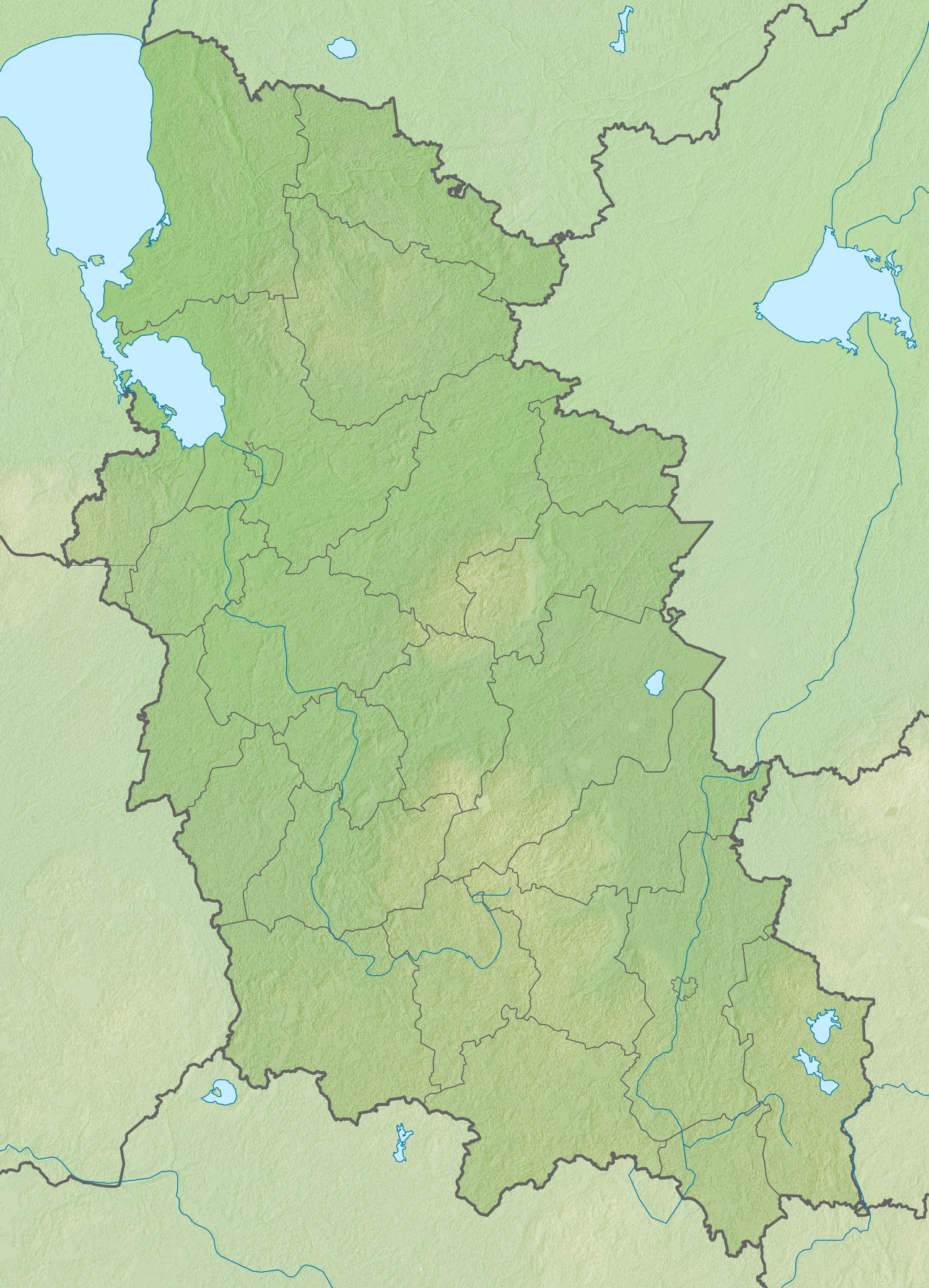
- Location within Pskov Oblast
- Location: Pskov Oblast
- Coordinates: 56°14′N 31°15′E
- Primary outflows: Zhizhitsa River
- Basin countries: Russia
- Surface area: 51.3 square kilometres (19.8 mi^{2})
- Average depth: 3.2 metres (10 ft)
- Max. depth: 7.8 metres (26 ft)

Lake Zhizhitskoye (Russian: Жижицкое озеро) is a brackish lake, located in Kunyinsky District of Pskov Oblast in Russia. It is the second biggest lake in Pskov Oblast after Lake Peipus. The area of the lake is 51.3 square kilometres (19.8 mi^{2}). Lake Undozero is the source of the Zhizhitsa River, a right tributary of the Western Dvina River, and thus belongs to the Baltic Sea basin.

The lake has been designated a nature monument protected at the local level. There are twenty-five species of fish in the lake, of which zander is historically significant and was reportedly sent to Moscow to the Tsar on a regular basis. However, fishing quotas are continuously distributed, which leads to the drastic depopulation of fish in the lake, including zander.

The lake has an irregular shape with many islands. Its drainage basin includes areas in the east of Kunyinsky District, as well as in the southwest of Toropetsky District of Tver Oblast.
