= Loknyansky District =

Loknyansky District Локнянский район (Russian)
- District
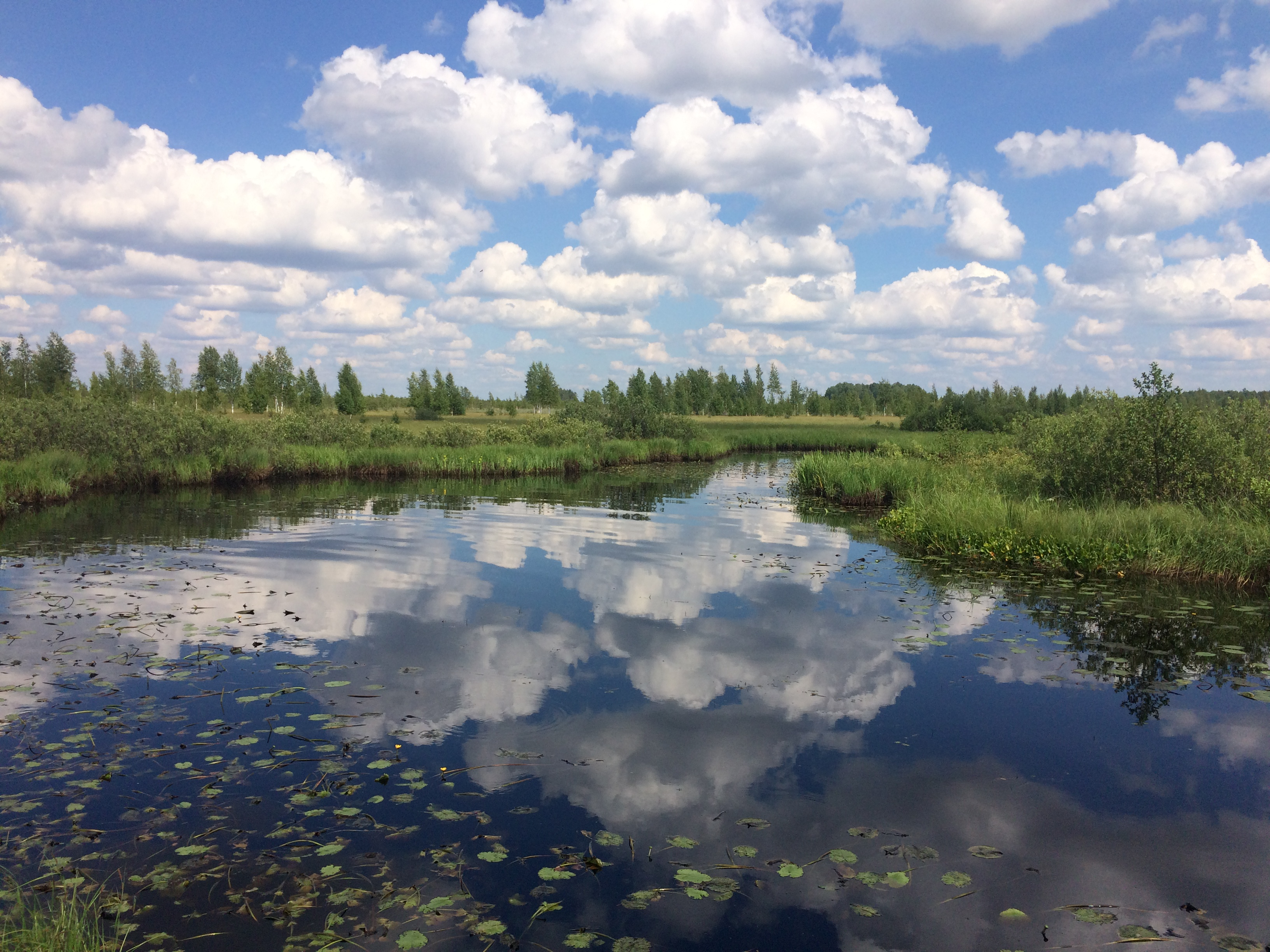
- Polistovsky Nature Reserve, Loknyansky District

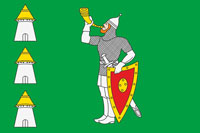
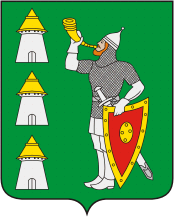
- Flag Coat of arms
- Location of Loknyansky District in Pskov Oblast
- Coordinates: 56°50′N 30°09′E
- Country: Russia
- Federal subject: Pskov Oblast
- Established: 1927
- Administrative center: Loknya

Area
  - Total: 2,412 km^{2} (931 sq mi)

Population (2010 Census)
  - Total: 9,535
  - Density: 3.953/km^{2} (10.24/sq mi)
  - Urban: 40.6%
  - Rural: 59.4%

Administrative structure
  - Inhabited localities: 1 urban-type settlements, 276 rural localities

Municipal structure
  - Municipally incorporated as: Loknyansky Municipal District
  - Municipal divisions: 1 urban settlements, 6 rural settlements
- Time zone: UTC+3 (MSK)
- OKTMO ID: 58618000
- Website: http://loknja.reg60.ru/

Loknyansky District (Russian: Локнянский райо́н) is an administrative and municipal district (raion), one of the twenty-four in Pskov Oblast, Russia. It is located in the east of the oblast and borders with Kholmsky District of Novgorod Oblast in the northeast, Toropetsky District of Tver Oblast in the southeast, Velikoluksky District in the south, Novosokolnichesky District in the southwest, and with Bezhanitsky District in the northwest. The area of the district is 2,412 square kilometers (931 sq mi). Its administrative center is the urban locality (a work settlement) of Loknya. Population: 9,535 (2010 census); 13,268 (2002 Census); 16,782 (1989 Soviet census). The population of Loknya accounts for 40.6% of the district's total population.

== Geography ==
The district is elongated from west to east. The northeastern part is occupied by swamps and is hardly populated. A part of it belongs to the Polistovsky Nature Reserve, one of the first wetland preserves in Russia, founded in 1994. It was created to protect the raised bog landscapes of the Polist-Lovat Swamp System.

The whole area of the district lies in the basin of the Lovat River and thus in the basin of the Neva. The Lovat crosses the eastern part of the district; its largest tributaries within the district are the Loknya (left) and the Kunya River (right), the short stretch of the latter forming the border with Tver Oblast. There is a lake region in the west of Loknyansky District, with the largest lakes being Loknovo, Uzho, and Ale. Another lake of considerable size, Lake Dulovo, is located in the east of the district.

== History ==
The area was populated since medieval times and was located on the waterways which connected Novgorod and Pskov with Velikiye Luki. In the 15th century, the pogost of Vlitsy was founded. Also in the 15th century, the region was annexed by the Grand Duchy of Moscow. In the course of the administrative reform carried out in 1708 by Peter the Great, it was included into Ingermanland Governorate (known since 1710 as Saint Petersburg Governorate). In 1727, separate Novgorod Governorate was split off, and in 1772, Pskov Governorate (which between 1777 and 1796 existed as Pskov Viceroyalty) was established. The area was a part of Velikoluksky and Kholmsky Uyezds of Pskov Governorate.

On August 1, 1927, the uyezds were abolished and Loknyansky District was established, with the administrative center in the work settlement of Loknya. It included parts of former Velikoluksky and Kholmsky Uyezds. The governorates were abolished as well and the district became a part of Velikiye Luki Okrug of Leningrad Oblast. On June 17, 1929, the district was transferred to Western Oblast. On July 23, 1930, the okrugs were also abolished and the districts were directly subordinated to the oblast. On January 29, 1935, the district was transferred to Kalinin Oblast, and on February 5 of the same year, Loknyansky District became a part of Velikiye Luki Okrug of Kalinin Oblast, one of the okrugs abutting the state boundaries of the Soviet Union. On May 11, 1937, the district was transferred to Opochka Okrug. On May 4, 1938, the district was subordinated directly to the oblast. Between 1941 and 1944, Loknyansky District was occupied by German troops. On August 22, 1944, the district was transferred to newly established Velikiye Luki Oblast. On October 2, 1957, Velikiye Luki Oblast was abolished and Loknyansky District was transferred to Pskov Oblast. The district was abolished on February 1, 1963 but re-established on January 12, 1965.

On August 1, 1927, Troitsky District was established as well. It included parts of former Velikoluksky and Kholmsky Uyezds, and its administrative center was located in the selo of Troitsa-Khlavitsa. The district was a part of Velikiye Luki Okrug of Leningrad Oblast and was transferred to Western Oblast on June 17, 1929 with the rest of the okrug. In August 1930, the district was renamed Lovatsky. On September 20, 1930, the district was abolished and split between Kholmsky and Loknyansky Districts.

Another district created on August 1, 1927 was Rykovsky District with the administrative center in the selo of Skokovo. It included parts of former Velikoluksky and Opochetsky Uyezds. The district was a part of Velikiye Luki Okrug of Leningrad Oblast. On June 17, 1929, the district was transferred to Western Oblast. On September 20, 1930, Rykovsky District was abolished and split between Nasvinsky, Loknyansky, Novosokolnichesky, and Pustoshkinsky Districts.

On August 1, 1927 Nasvinsky District was also established, with the administrative center in the settlement of Nasva. It included parts of former Velikoluksky Uyezd. The district was a part of Velikiye Luki Okrug of Leningrad Oblast. On June 17, 1929, the district was transferred to Western Oblast. On January 1, 1932, Nasvinsky District was abolished and split between Loknyansky, Velikoluksky, and Novosokolnichesky Districts.

On June 1, 1936, Ashevsky District with the administrative center in the selo of Chikhachyovo was established. It included parts of Bezhanitsky and Loknyansky Districts. The district was a part of Velikiye Luki Okrug of Kalinin Oblast. On May 11, 1937, the district was transferred to Opochka Okrug. On May 4, 1938, the district was directly subordinated to Kalinin Oblast. Between 1941 and 1944, Ashevsky District was occupied by German troops. On August 23, 1944, it was included into newly established Pskov Oblast. On February 1, 1963, the district was abolished and merged into Bezhanitsky District.

On March 10, 1945, Podberezinsky District with the administrative center in the selo of Podberezye was established. It included parts of Loknyansky, Kholmsky, and Ploskoshsky Districts. The district was a part of Velikiye Luki Oblast. On October 2, 1957, the district was transferred to Pskov Oblast. On January 14, 1958, the district was abolished and split between Kholmsky, Loknyansky, Velikoluksky, and Ploskoshsky Districts.

== Economy ==
=== Industry ===
The district contains enterprises of timber and food industries. The biggest of them is the bakery in Loknya.

=== Agriculture ===
The main agricultural specializations in the district are cattle breeding with meat and milk production, as well as production of fodder.

=== Transportation ===
The railway connecting St. Petersburg and Vitebsk crosses the district from north to south.

Loknya is connected by roads with Bezhanitsy (with access to Porkhov and Novorzhev), with Kholm, and with Velikiye Luki. There are also local roads.

== Culture and recreation ==
The district contains seven objects classified as cultural and historical heritage of federal significance and forty-one monuments of local significance. The federal monuments are the Trinity Church in the village of Miritinitsy, the Intercession Church in the village of Medvedovo, as well as four archaeological sites and the location where Alexander Matrosov was killed in battle in 1943 when he blocked a German machine gun fire with his body.
