= Velikoluksky =

Velikoluksky (masculine), Velikolukskaya (feminine), or Velikolukskoye (neuter) may refer to:

- Velikoluksky District, a district of Pskov Oblast, Russia
- Velikolukskoye, a rural locality (a settlement) in Kaliningrad Oblast, Russia
