= Loknya (Lovat tributary) =

- Native name: Локня (Russian)

Location
- Country: Russia

Physical characteristics
- Source
  - location: Lake Loknovo
- Mouth: Lovat
  - coordinates: 56°53′18″N 30°36′59″E
- Length: 119 km (74 mi)
- Basin size: 2,190 square kilometres (850 mi^{2})

Basin features
- Progression: Lovat→ Lake Ilmen→ Volkhov→ Lake Ladoga→ Neva→ Gulf of Finland

The Loknya (Russian: Локня) is a river in Loknyansky and Bezhanitsky Districts of Pskov Oblast in Russia. It is a left tributary of the Lovat. It is 119 kilometres (74 mi) long, and the area of its basin 2,190 square kilometres (850 sq mi).

The name of the settlement of Loknya, and, consequently, of Loknyansky District originated from the name of the river.

The source of the Loknya is Lake Loknovo in the southwestern part of Loknyansky District. The river flows to the northeast, and a stretch of it is located at the border between Bezhanitsky and Loknyansky Districts. To the north of the work settlement of Loknya it turns southeast, and further downstream turns northeast again. The mouth of the Loknya is located downstream of the village of Zezyuli.

The drainage basin of the Loknya comprises the western part of Loknyansky District and some areas in Bezhanitsky District.
