= Velikiye Luki Oblast =

Coordinates: 56°20′N 30°32′E

Velikiye Luki Oblast Великолукская область
- Oblast of Soviet Union
- 1944–1957
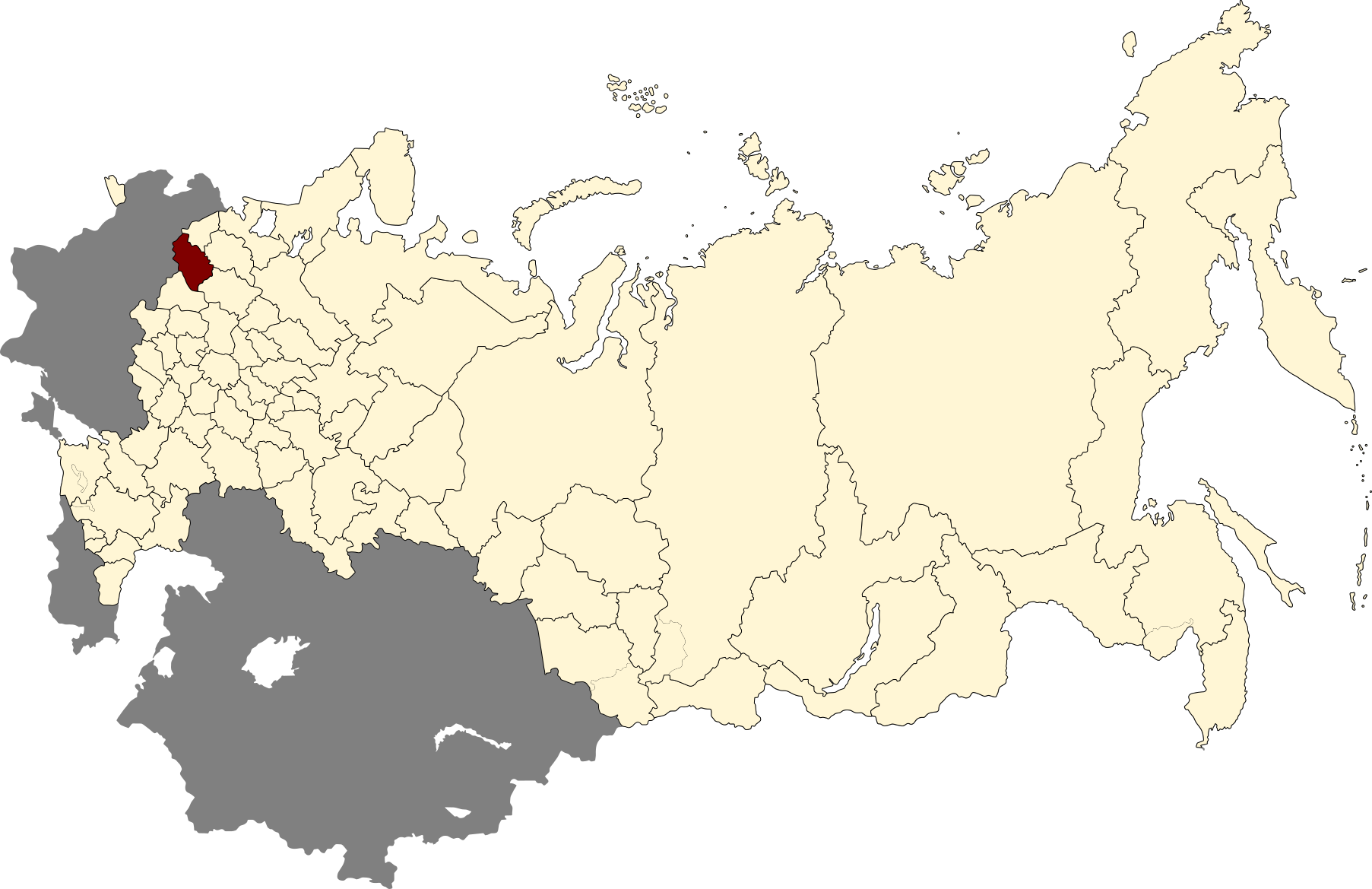
- Velikiye Luki Oblast in 1956
- Capital: Velikiye Luki
- History
  - Established: 23 August 1944
  - Disestablished: 2 October 1957
- Political subdivisions: twenty-eight districts

Velikiye Luki Oblast (Russian: Великолукская область, Velikolukskaya oblast) was an oblast (a first-level administrative and municipal unit) of the Russian SFSR from 1944 to 1957. Its seat was in the city of Velikiye Luki. The oblast was located in the northwest of European Russia, and its territory is currently divided between Novgorod, Pskov, and Tver Oblasts.

== History ==
Velikiye Luki Oblast was established on 22 August 1944, one day before Pskov Oblast, to administrate areas of Soviet Union previously occupied by German troops and liberated in the course of World War II. It included twenty-three districts,

1. Belsky (with the administrative center located in Bely);
2. Bezhanitsky (Bezhanitsy);
3. Idritsky (Idritsa);
4. Ilyinsky (Ilyino);
5. Kholmsky (Kholm);
6. Krasnogorodsky (Krasnogorodsk);
7. Kudeversky (Kudever);
8. Kunyinsky (Kunya);
9. Leninsky (Andreapol);
10. Loknyansky (Loknya);
11. Nelidovsky (Nelidovo);
12. Nevelsky (Nevel);
13. Novosokolnichesky (Novosokolniki);
14. Oktyabrsky (Zapadnaya Dvina);
15. Opochetsky (Opochka);
16. Penovsky (Peno);
17. Ploskoshsky (Ploskosh);
18. Pustoshkinsky (Pustoshka);
19. Sebezhsky (Sebezh);
20. Seryozhinsky (Bologovo);
21. Toropetsky (Toropets);
22. Usvyatsky (Usvyaty);
23. Velikoluksky (Velikiye Luki).

Kholmsky District was transferred from Novgorod Oblast, Belsky, Ilyinsky, and Usvyatsky Districts were transferred from Smolensk Oblast, and other districts were split off from Kalinin Oblast.

On 10 March 1945 four more districts, Podberezinsky (with the administrative center located in Podberezye), Porechensky (Porechye), Prihabsky (Prikhaby), and Zharkovsky (Zharkovsky), were established. In 1948, the center of Prikhabsky District was transferred to the selo of Usmyn, and in 1948, the district was renamed Usmynsky District. In 1952, Ust-Dolyssky District with the center in the selo of Ust-Dolyssy was established.

The most important authority in the oblast was the first secretary of the CPSU Oblast Committee. The following persons were the first secretaries,

- Grigory Mefodyevich Boykachyov (1944–1950);
- Zakhar Filippovich Slaykovsky (1950–1951);
- Sergey Stepanovich Rumyantsev (1951–1955);
- Ivan Petrovich Tur (1955–1957).

On 2 October 1957 Velikiye Luki Oblast was abolished. Its area was split between Kalinin and Pskov Oblasts. Belsky, Ilyinsky, Leninsky, Nelidovsky, Oktyabrsky, Penovsky, Seryozhinsky, Toropetsky, and Zharkovsky Districts were transferred to Kalinin Oblast, and all other districts were merged into Pskov Oblast.
