= Kunya, Pskov Oblast =

Kunya Кунья
- Work settlement
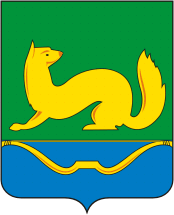
- Coat of arms
- Interactive map of Kunya
- Location of Kunya Kunya (Pskov Oblast)
- Coordinates: 56°17′N 30°58′E
- Country: Russia
- Federal subject: Pskov Oblast
- Administrative district: Kunyinsky District
- Founded: 1901
- Urban-type settlement status since: 1966

Population (2010 Census)
  - Total: 3,127
  - Estimate (2021): 2,902 (−7.2%)

Administrative status
  - Capital of: Kunyinsky District

Municipal status
  - Municipal district: Kunyinsky Municipal District
  - Urban settlement: Kunya
  - Capital of: Kunyinsky Municipal District, Kunya Urban Settlement
- Time zone: UTC+3 (MSK)
- Postal code: 182010
- OKTMO ID: 58616151051
- Website: kuniya.ru/wordpress/?page_id=10

Kunya (Russian: Кунья) is an urban locality (a work settlement) and the administrative center of Kunyinsky District of Pskov Oblast, Russia. Municipally, it is incorporated as Kunya Urban Settlement, the only urban settlement in the district. Population: 3,127 (2010 census); 3,527 (2002 census); 4,023 (1989 Soviet census).

== History ==
Kunya was founded in 1901 as a settlement serving the railway station on the newly constructed railway between Moscow and Riga. It was the administrative center of Kunyinskaya Volost of Velikoluksky Uyezd of Pskov Governorate.

On August 1, 1927, the uyezds were abolished, and Kunyinsky District was established, with the administrative center in Kunya. Pskov Governorate was abolished as well, and the district became a part of Velikiye Luki Okrug of Leningrad Oblast. On June 17, 1929, the district was transferred to Western Oblast. On July 23, 1930, the okrugs were also abolished and the districts were directly subordinated to the oblast. On January 1, 1932 the district was abolished, but on February 10, 1935, it was re-established as a part of Velikiye Luki Okrug of Kalinin Oblast, one of the okrugs abutting the state boundaries of the Soviet Union. On May 4, 1938, the district was subordinated directly to the oblast. Between August 1941 and January 1942, Kunya was occupied by German troops. On August 22, 1944, the district was transferred to newly established Velikiye Luki Oblast. On October 2, 1957, Velikiye Luki Oblast was abolished, and Kunyinsky District was transferred to Pskov Oblast. On February 1, 1963 the district was abolished and merged into Velikoluksky District; on January 12, 1965 it was re-established. On March 2, 1966 Kunya was granted urban-type settlement status.

== Economy ==
=== Industry ===
Industry in Kunya is represented by two bakeries.

=== Transportation ===
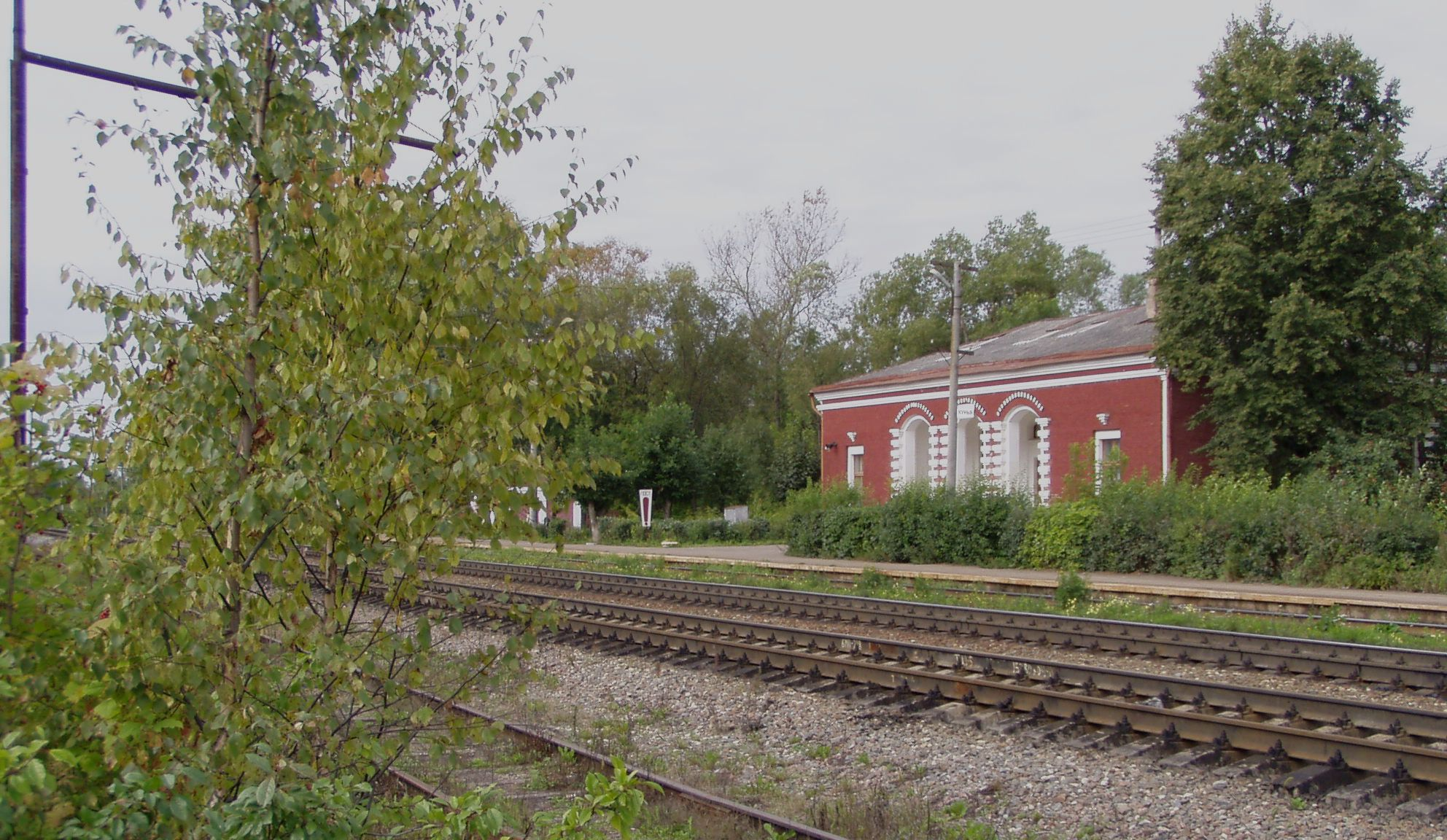
Kunya railway station

Kunya has a railway station on the railway connecting Moscow via Velikiye Luki with Riga.

The M9 highway which connects Moscow and Riga crosses the district from east to west, bypassing Kunya from the south. Kunya is connected by road with Usvyaty. There are also local roads.
