= Martyanovo, Ivanovo Oblast =

Martyanovo Мартьяново
- Village
- Location within Ivanovo Oblast Location within Russia
- Coordinates: 56°51′N 39°26′E
- Country: Russia
- Region: Ivanovo Oblast
- District: Ilyinsky District
- Time zone: UTC+3:00

Martyanovo (Russian: Мартьяново) is a rural locality (a village) in Ilyinsky District, Ivanovo Oblast, Russia. Population: 6 (2010 census);

== Geography ==
This rural locality is located 24 kilometres (15 mi) from Ilyinskoye-Khovanskoye (the district's administrative centre), 94 kilometres (58 mi) from Ivanovo (capital of Ivanovo Oblast) and 165 kilometres (103 mi) from Moscow. Malinovo is the nearest rural locality.
