= Martyanovo, Permsky District, Perm Krai =

Martyanovo Мартьяново
- Village
- Location within Perm Krai Location within Russia
- Coordinates: 57°56′N 56°21′E
- Country: Russia
- Region: Perm Krai
- District: Permsky District
- Time zone: UTC+5:00

Martyanovo (Russian: Мартьяново) is a rural locality (a village) in Frolovskoye Rural Settlement, Permsky District, Perm Krai, Russia. The population was 34 as of 2010. There are 46 streets.

== Geography ==
Martyanovo is located 14 km southeast of Perm (the district's administrative centre) by road. Bolshaya Mos is the nearest rural locality.
