= Lovat (river) =

River in Belarus and Russia

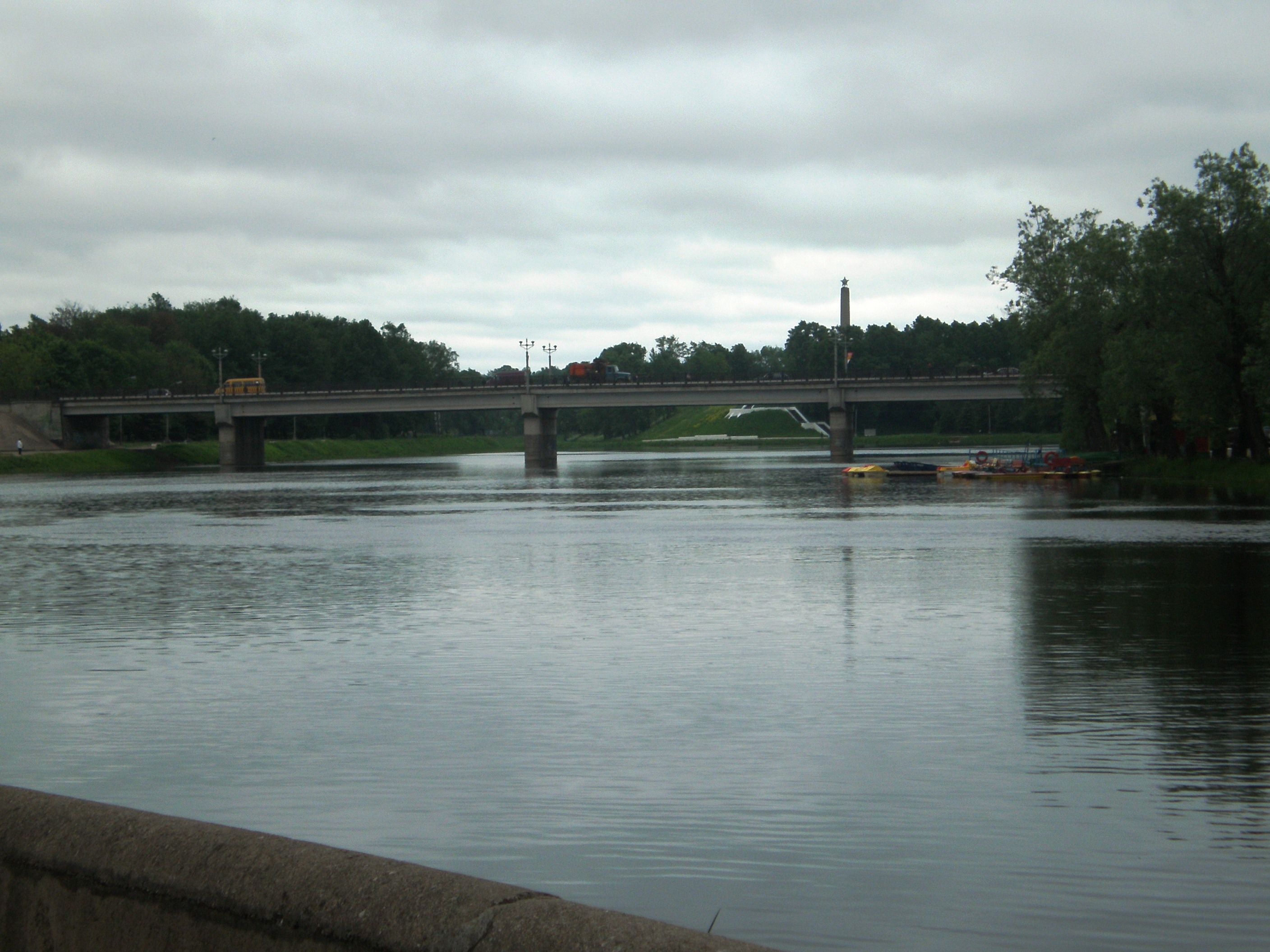
- The Lovat in Velikiye Luki

Location
- Country: Belarus, Russia

Physical characteristics
- Source: Lake Lovatets
  - location: Khoteshino, Russia
  - coordinates: 55°50′46″N 30°17′56″E
  - elevation: 170 m (560 ft)
- Mouth: Lake Ilmen
  - location: Vzvad, Russia
  - coordinates: 58°12′42″N 31°26′40″E
  - elevation: 16 m (52 ft)
- Length: 530 km (330 mi)
- Basin size: 21,900 km^{2} (8,500 sq mi)
- Discharge
  - average: 105 m^{3}/s (3,700 cu ft/s)

Basin features
- Progression: Lake Ilmen→ Volkhov→ Lake Ladoga→ Neva→ Gulf of Finland

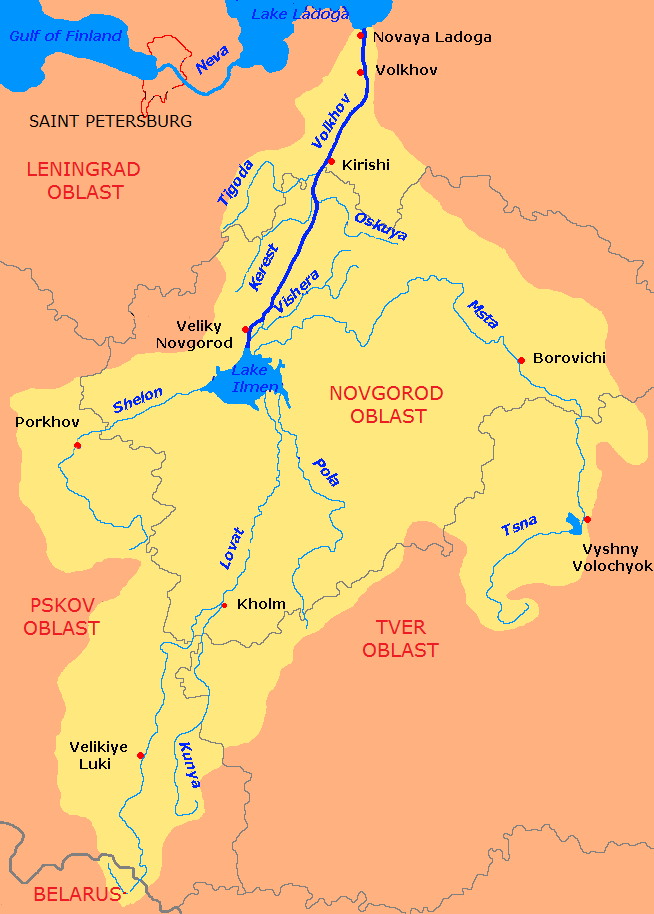
The Volkhov River drainage vasin. The Lovat is shown on the map.

The Lovat (Belarusian: Ловаць, romanized: Lovac', IPA: [ˈɫovatsʲ]; Russian: Ло́вать) is a river in Vitebsk Oblast of Belarus, Usvyatsky, Velikoluksky, and Loknyansky Districts, as well as of the city of Velikiye Luki, of Pskov Oblast and Kholmsky, Poddorsky, Starorussky, and Parfinsky Districts of Novgorod Oblast in Russia. The source of the Lovat is Lake Lovatets in northeastern Belarus, and the Lovat is a tributary of Lake Ilmen. Its main tributaries are the Loknya (left), the Kunya (right), the Polist (left), the Redya (left), and the Robya (right). The towns of Velikiye Luki and Kholm, as well as the urban-type settlement of Parfino, are located on the banks of the Lovat.

From the source, the Lovat flows in the southeastern direction along the border between Russia and Belarus, it turns north and enters Pskov Oblast of Russia, crossing the border as Lake Sesito. In this area, the Lowat flows through the lake district, passing, in particular, Lake Vorokhobskoye. Downstrean of Velikiye Luki, in the selo of Podberezye, the Lovat turns northwest and enters Novgorod Oblast. Close to Lake Ilmen, the Lovat shares a river delta with the Pola and the Polist, though technically Polist is counted as a tributary of the Lovat.

The river basin of the Lovat comprises vast areas in the south of Novgorod and Pskov Oblasts, as well as some areas in Tver Oblast and Vitebsk Oblast of Belarus.

The Lovat is listed in the State Water Register of Russia as navigable between Parfino and the mouth, though there is no passenger navigation. Until the 1990s, it was used for timber rafting.

The Lovat served as a stretch of the trade route from the Varangians to the Greeks, the most important trading route of medieval Rus. From Lake Ilmen, ships went upstream the Lovat and then the Kunya, before ending up in the Western Dvina.They then travelled up the Kasplya river to Lake Kasplya from where they crossed the portage to the Dnieper, from where they could reach Constantinople via the Black Sea.
