= Principality of Toropets =

Principality of Toropets Торопецкое княжество (Russian)
- 1167–1250s/1355
- Status: Vassal state of Smolensk; (1167-1226): Sovereign state; (1231-~1250): Vassal state of Lithuania; (1253-1355)
- Capital: Toropets
- Government: Principality
- Prince of Toropets
  - 1167–1180: Mstislav the Brave (first)
- Historical era: Middle Ages
  - Established: 1167
  - Disestablished: 1250s/1355
Preceded by	Succeeded by
Principality of Smolensk	Grand Duchy of Lithuania
- Today part of: Tver, Pskov, Novgorod
- 1. Date of disestablishment vary, with chronicles stating annexation by Lithuania in 1355, while Valentin Yanin argued its annexation occurred during the 1250s.

The Principality of Toropets (Russian: Торопецкое княжество) was a Russian principality or duchy, which existed between 1167 and the 14th century. It was established as a principality dependent on the Principality of Smolensk and was annexed by the Grand Duchy of Lithuania. The capital of the principality was Toropets. In terms of modern administrative division of Russia, the area of the principality is split between the Tver (western part), Pskov and Novgorod (southern parts) oblasts.

== History ==
Toropets was first mentioned in chronicles in 1074, when it belonged to the Principality of Smolensk and was the second important town of the principality. Before 1167, Toropets was given to Mstislav the Brave, and thus the Principality of Toropets was established, which was formally subordinate to the Principality of Smolensk. All the subsequent Princes of Toropets mentioned in sources were descendants of Mstislav.

In the end of the 13th century, the principality, though not particularly significant, became a buffer state between the Principality of Smolensk, the Novgorod Republic, and the duchy of Lithuania. In the beginning of the 13th century, Lithuanians repeatedly attempted to annex the principality, and in 1225/26 even Davyd, the prince of Toropets, was killed in battle. It is not exactly known when in the 13th century they finally won, but Toropets mentioned as independent in 1231, and again in 1239, when Alexander Nevsky had his wedding in Toropets, and in 1248. In 1253, Toropets already belonged to the duchy of Lithuania and was used as a base for attacks on adjacent lands. After the 1250s, Toropets was not mentioned in the chronicles, though the geography of Lithuanian attacks shows that in 1285 it still belonged to Lithuania.

Chronicles mention that Toropets was finally annexed by the Grand Duchy of Lithuania in 1355, though Valentin Yanin argued it happened in the 1250s.

== List of princes ==
For most of the princes of Toropets, we do not know the extent of their rule; they are typically mentioned in connection to one or several isolated events. For the same reason, we do not know whether the list is complete, and some princes were never mentioned by chronicles.

- 1167 Mstislav the Brave
- 1208, 1209 Mstislav the Bold
- 1211 Vladimir Mstislavich
- 1212-1225/6 Davyd Mstislavich, died in a battle with Lithuania

== See also ==
- Bibliography of Russian history
