= Toropets =

Town in Tver Oblast, Russia

Toropets Торопец
- Town
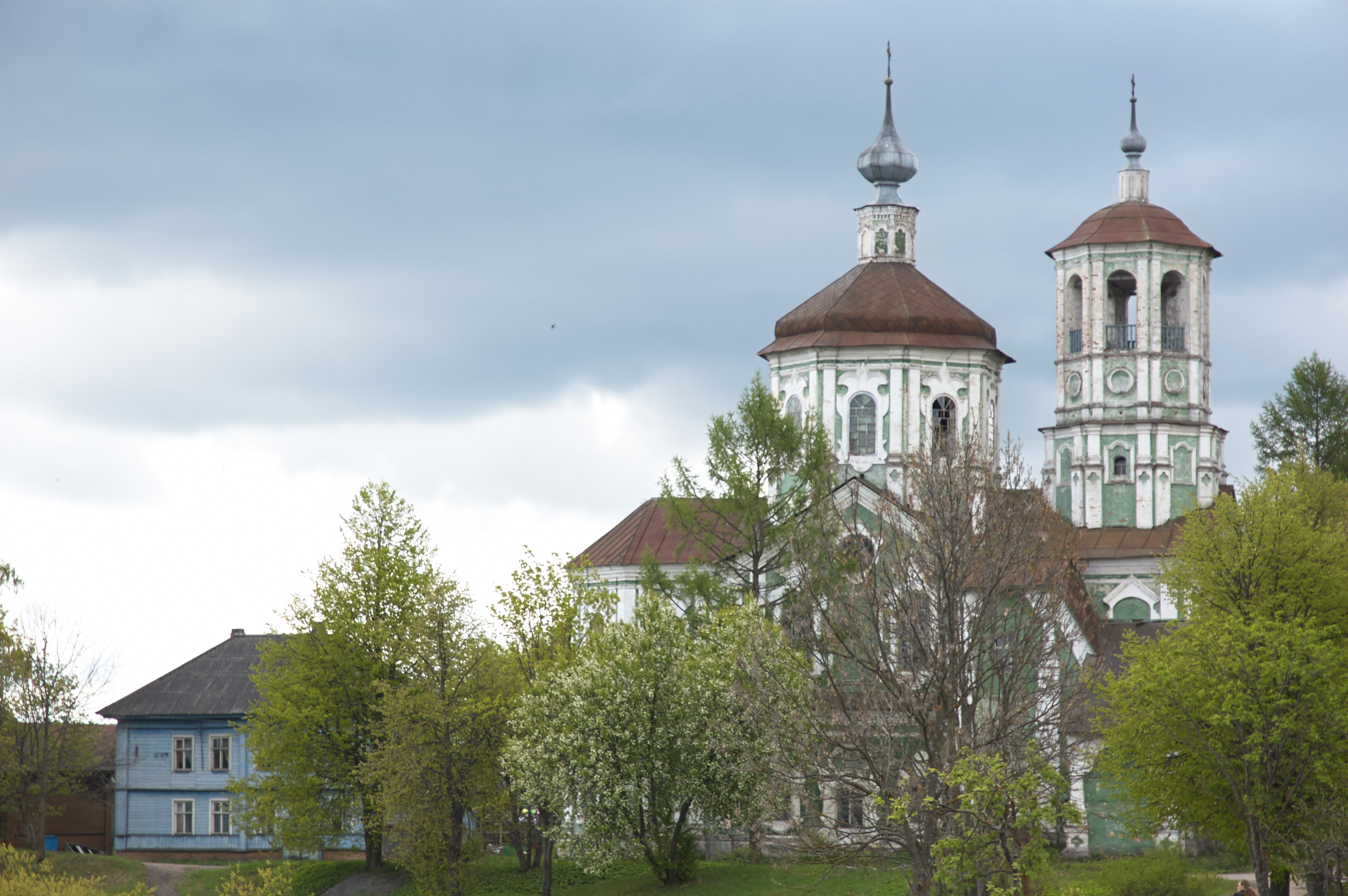
- View of Toropets

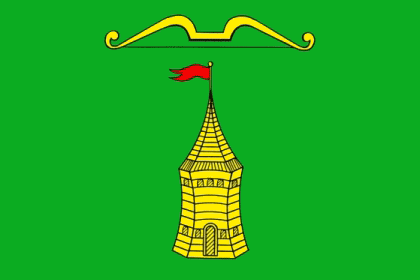
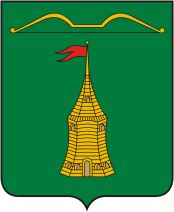
- Flag Coat of arms
- Interactive map of Toropets
- Location of Toropets Toropets (European Russia) Toropets (Russia) Toropets (Europe)
- Coordinates: 56°30′N 31°39′E
- Country: Russia
- Federal subject: Tver Oblast
- Administrative district: Toropetsky District
- Urban settlementSelsoviet: Toropets
- First mentioned: 1074
- Elevation: 180 m (590 ft)

Population (2010 Census)
  - Total: 13,015
  - Estimate (2021): 11,441 (−12.1%)

Administrative status
  - Capital of: Toropetsky District, Toropets Urban Settlement

Municipal status
  - Municipal district: Toropetsky Municipal District
  - Urban settlement: Toropets Urban Settlement
  - Capital of: Toropetsky Municipal District, Toropets Urban Settlement
- Time zone: UTC+3 (MSK)
- Postal codes: 172840, 172842, 172899
- OKTMO ID: 28655101001

Toropets (Russian: Торо́пец) is a town and the administrative center of Toropetsky District in Tver Oblast, Russia, located where the Toropa River enters Lake Solomennoye. Population: 13,015 (2010 census); 14,600 (2002 census); 17,510 (1989 Soviet census).

== History ==
In 1074, when the town was first mentioned in chronicles, Toropets belonged to the Princes of Smolensk. By 1167, it was large enough to have its own princes. The most famous of its rulers was Mstislav the Bold, whose grandson Alexander Nevsky wed Alexandra of Polotsk in Toropets in 1239.

In the mid-14th century the town passed to the Grand Duchy of Lithuania, which had to surrender it to Ivan III following the Battle of Vedrosha in 1503. In the early 17th century, Toropets was ransacked by the Polish army. In the course of the administrative reform carried out in 1708 by Peter the Great, Toropets was included into Ingermanland Governorate (known since 1710 as Saint Petersburg Governorate). In 1727, separate Novgorod Governorate was split off. Toropets was included into Velikiye Luki Province. In 1772, as a result of the First Partition of Poland, Inflanty Voivodeship and eastern Belarus were transferred to Russia. In order to accommodate these areas, Pskov Governorate was created, and Toropets was transferred to Pskov Governorate. The town of Opochka was made the administrative center of the governorate. Pskov Governorate has proven to be too big to be administered properly, and in 1776, the decree of the empress, Catherine the Great, was issued. It divided the governorate into Pskov and Polotsk Governorates. Pskov was made the administrative center of Pskov Governorate, and Toropets remained in Pskov Governorate. In 1777, Pskov Governorate was transformed into Pskov Viceroyalty, which was administered from Novgorod by Jacob Sievers. In 1796, the viceroyalty was abolished, and on 31 December 1796 the emperor Paul I issued a decree restoring Pskov Governorate. Toropets was the center of Toropetsky Uyezd of Pskov Governorate.

The Soviet authority in Toropets was established on October 30 (November 12), 1917. On August 1, 1927, Pskov Governorate was abolished, and Leningrad Oblast was established. Toropetsky Uyezd was abolished as well, and Toropetsky District, with the administrative center in Toropets, was established. It belonged to Velikiye Luki Okrug of Leningrad Oblast. On June 17, 1929, the district was transferred to Western Oblast. On August 1, 1930, the okrugs were abolished, and the districts were subordinated directly to the oblast. On January 29, 1935 Kalinin Oblast was established, and Toropetsky District was transferred to Kalinin Oblast. The town was occupied by the Wehrmacht during WWII, from August 29, 1941 until January 21, 1942, when it was retaken during the Toropets–Kholm Offensive. On August 22, 1944, the district was transferred to newly established Velikiye Luki Oblast. On October 2, 1957, Velikiye Luki Oblast was abolished, and Toropetssky District was transferred back to Kalinin Oblast. In 1990, Kalinin Oblast was renamed Tver Oblast.

On the night of 17–18 September 2024, during the Russo-Ukrainian War, Ukraine launched a drone attack on the Main Missile and Artillery Directorate (GRAU) ammunition depot in Toropets, causing a series of massive explosions and fires and shattering of many windows on a large radius and Toropets itself. Igor Rudenya, the governor of Tver Oblast, announced a partial evacuation of the town.

== Administrative and municipal status ==
Within the framework of administrative divisions, Toropets serves as the administrative center of Toropetsky District. As an administrative division, it is incorporated within Toropetsky District as Toropets Urban Settlement. As a municipal division, this administrative unit also has urban settlement status and is a part of Toropetsky Municipal District.

== Economy ==
=== Industry ===
There are enterprises of chemical, metallurgical, textile, and food industries in Toropets.

=== Transportation ===
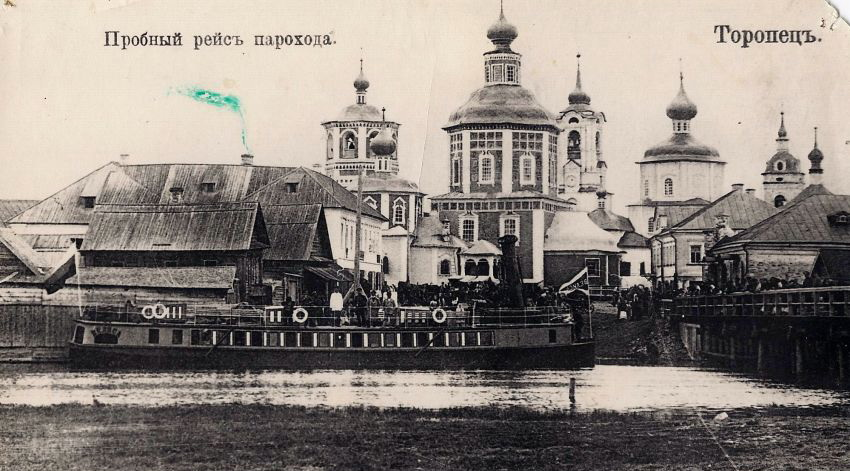
Toropets in 1909

The railway connecting Bologoye with Velikiye Luki passes through Toropets. There is infrequent passenger traffic.

The M9 highway connecting Moscow with Riga also crosses the southern part of Toropetsky District. Toropets has access to it via a paved road. The same road continues to the north to Kholm and further to Staraya Russa.

== Culture and recreation ==
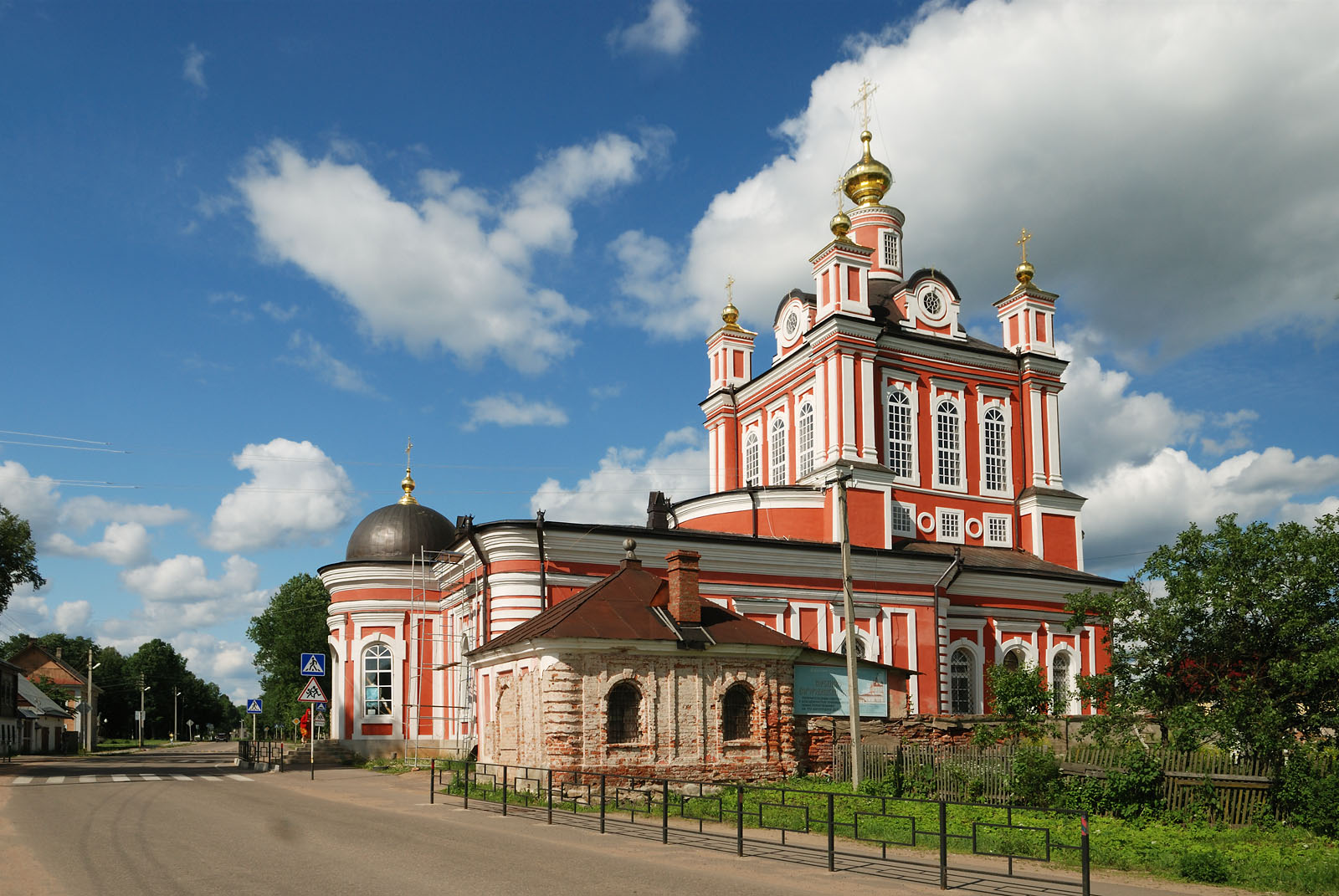
Church of the Theotokos of Korsun, built between 1795 and 1804

Toropets contains 66 cultural heritage monuments of federal significance and additionally 30 objects classified as cultural and historical heritage of local significance. The federal monuments include plenty of buildings in the historical center of Toropets. The oldest brick churches in the town are dedicated to St. Nicholas (1666–1669), to Our Lady of Kazan (1698–1765), and to John the Baptist (1704).

There are a number of museums in Toropets, which include the Toropets District Museum, the Museum of the History of Photography, the house-museum of Patriarch Tikhon (Tikhon, in the future the Patriarch of the Russian Orthodox Church, lived here as a child for ten years).

== Notable people ==
- Patriarch Tikhon of Moscow (1865–1925), primate of the Russian Orthodox Church
- Pyotr Ivanovich Ricord (1776–1855), admiral
