= Toropetsky Uyezd =

Toropetsky Uyezd (Торо́пецкий уе́зд) was one of the subdivisions of the Pskov Governorate of the Russian Empire. It was situated in the southeastern part of the governorate. Its administrative centre was Toropets.

== Demographics ==
At the time of the Russian Empire Census of 1897, Toropetsky Uyezd had a population of 96,472. Of these, 92.7% spoke Russian, 3.0% Estonian, 1.7% Yiddish, 1.4% Latvian, 0.8% Finnish, 0.2% German and 0.2% Polish as their native language.
