= Kholm, Kholmsky District, Novgorod Oblast =

Town in Novgorod Oblast, Russia

Kholm Холм
- Town
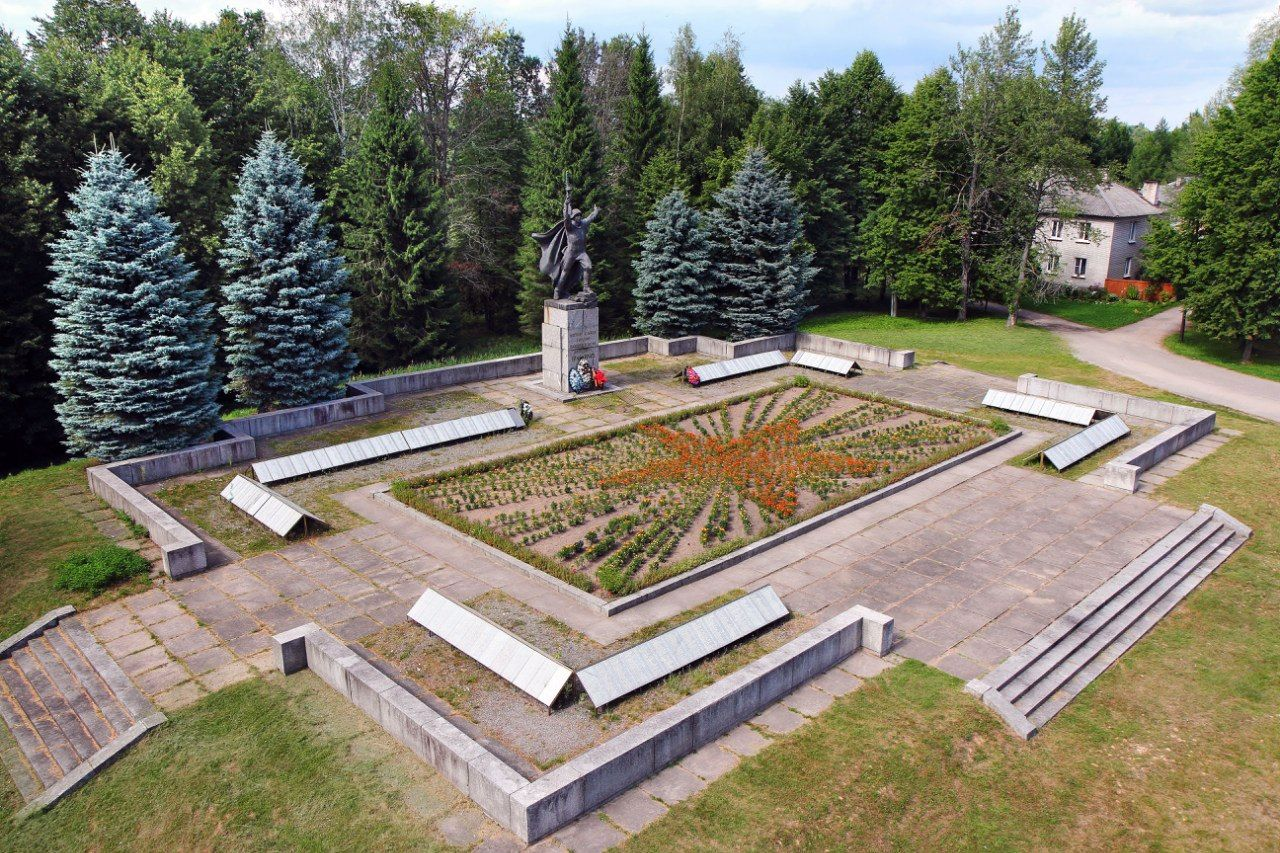

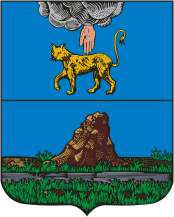
- Coat of arms
- Interactive map of Kholm
- Location of Kholm Kholm (Novgorod Oblast)
- Coordinates: 57°09′N 31°11′E
- Country: Russia
- Federal subject: Novgorod Oblast
- Administrative district: Kholmsky District
- Town of district significanceSelsoviet: Kholm
- First mentioned: 1144
- Town status since: 1777
- Elevation: 65 m (213 ft)

Population (2010 Census)
  - Total: 3,830
  - Estimate (2021): 3,214 (−16.1%)

Administrative status
  - Capital of: Kholmsky District, town of district significance of Kholm

Municipal status
  - Municipal district: Kholmsky Municipal District
  - Urban settlement: Kholmskoye Urban Settlement
  - Capital of: Kholmsky Municipal District, Kholmskoye Urban Settlement
- Time zone: UTC+3 (MSK)
- Postal codes: 175270, 175271
- OKTMO ID: 49647101001

Kholm (Russian: Холм) is a town and the administrative center of Kholmsky District in Novgorod Oblast, Russia, located at the confluence of the Lovat and Kunya Rivers, 77 kilometers (48 mi) north of Toropets, 93 kilometers (58 mi) southwest of Staraya Russa, and 201 kilometers (125 mi) south of Veliky Novgorod, the administrative center of the oblast. Population: 3,830 (2010 census); 4,325 (2002 census); 4,849 (1989 Soviet census).

== History ==
The Lovat River was a part of the trade route from the Varangians to the Greeks, one of the oldest trading routes passing through Rus'. The settlement was first mentioned in 1144 as Kholmsky pogost (Холмский погост). During the Middle Ages, the town, then a seat of the Princes of Kholm, withstood innumerable sieges by Lithuanians, Poles, and Swedes.

In 1777, it was elevated in status to that of an uyezd town of Pskov Viceroyalty and given its present name. In 1796, it was transferred to Pskov Governorate. In August 1927, the uyezds were abolished and, effective October 1, 1927, Kholmsky District was established, with the administrative center in Kholm. Pskov Governorate was abolished as well and the district became a part of Velikiye Luki Okrug of Leningrad Oblast. On June 3, 1929, Velikiye Luki Okrug was transferred to Western Oblast. On July 23, 1930 the okrugs were abolished and the districts were directly subordinated to the oblast. On January 29, 1935, the district became a part of the newly established Kalinin Oblast.

During World War II, it was occupied by the Wehrmacht from August 3, 1941 to February 21, 1944, when it was liberated. It was the scene of the Kholm Pocket from January 21 to May 5, 1942. The town was completely ruined and even now its current population is only a third of the pre-war one.

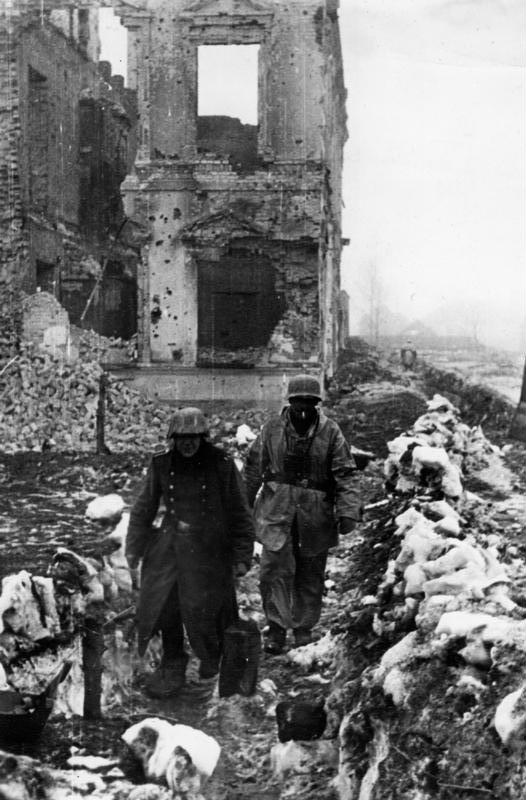
During the Kholm Pocket, 1942

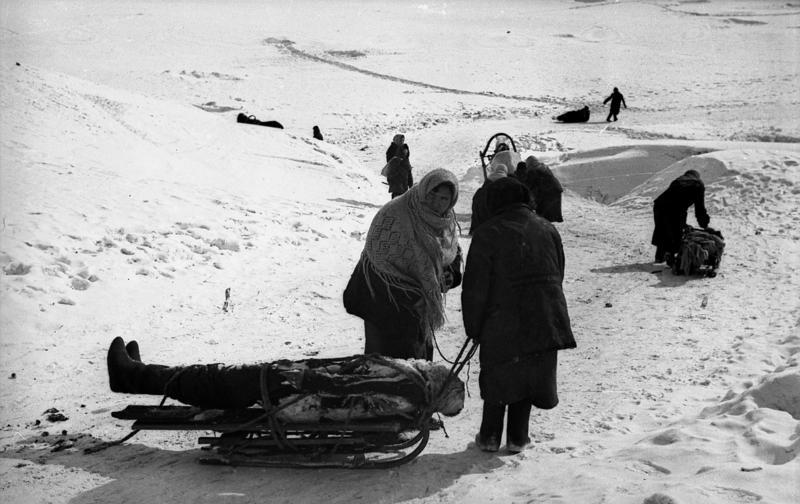
Women transporting dead on sledges during the occupation of the town, May 1942

On July 5, 1944, the district was included in newly established Novgorod Oblast, but already on August 22, 1944 it was transferred to newly established Velikiye Luki Oblast. On October 2, 1957, Velikiye Luki Oblast was abolished and Kholmsky District was transferred to Pskov Oblast. On July 29, 1958, it was transferred to Novgorod Oblast and remained there ever since.

== Administrative and municipal status ==
Within the framework of administrative divisions, Kholm serves as the administrative center of Kholmsky District. As an administrative division, it is incorporated within Kholmsky District as the town of district significance of Kholm. As a municipal division, the town of district significance of Kholm is incorporated within Kholmsky Municipal District as Kholmskoye Urban Settlement.

== Economy ==
=== Industry ===
The economy of Kholm and its district is based on timber industry.

=== Transportation ===
Kholm is connected by roads to Staraya Russa, to Bezhanitsy, to Demyansk via Maryovo, and to Toropets.

The Lovat and the Kunya Rivers are not navigable in Kholm.

== Culture and recreation ==
Kholm contains eight monuments classified as cultural and historical heritage of local significance. Seven of them are graves of and monuments to soldiers fallen in World War II, while the eighth one is an archaeological site.

In the dense woods and impracticable swamps to the west of Kholm lies the deserted Rdeysky Monastery.

Kholm hosts the Kholmsky District Museum which was opened in 1983.
