= Velikoluksky Uyezd =

Velikoluksky Uyezd (Великолу́кский уе́зд) was one of the subdivisions of the Pskov Governorate of the Russian Empire. It was situated in the southern part of the governorate. Its administrative centre was Velikiye Luki.

== Demographics ==
At the time of the Russian Empire Census of 1897, Velikoluksky Uyezd had a population of 123,779. Of these, 96.7% spoke Russian, 0.9% Yiddish, 0.6% Estonian, 0.5% Polish, 0.5% Finnish, 0.4% Latvian, 0.2% German, 0.1% Romani and 0.1% Belarusian as their native language.
