= Usvyacha =

Usvyacha Russian: Усвяча
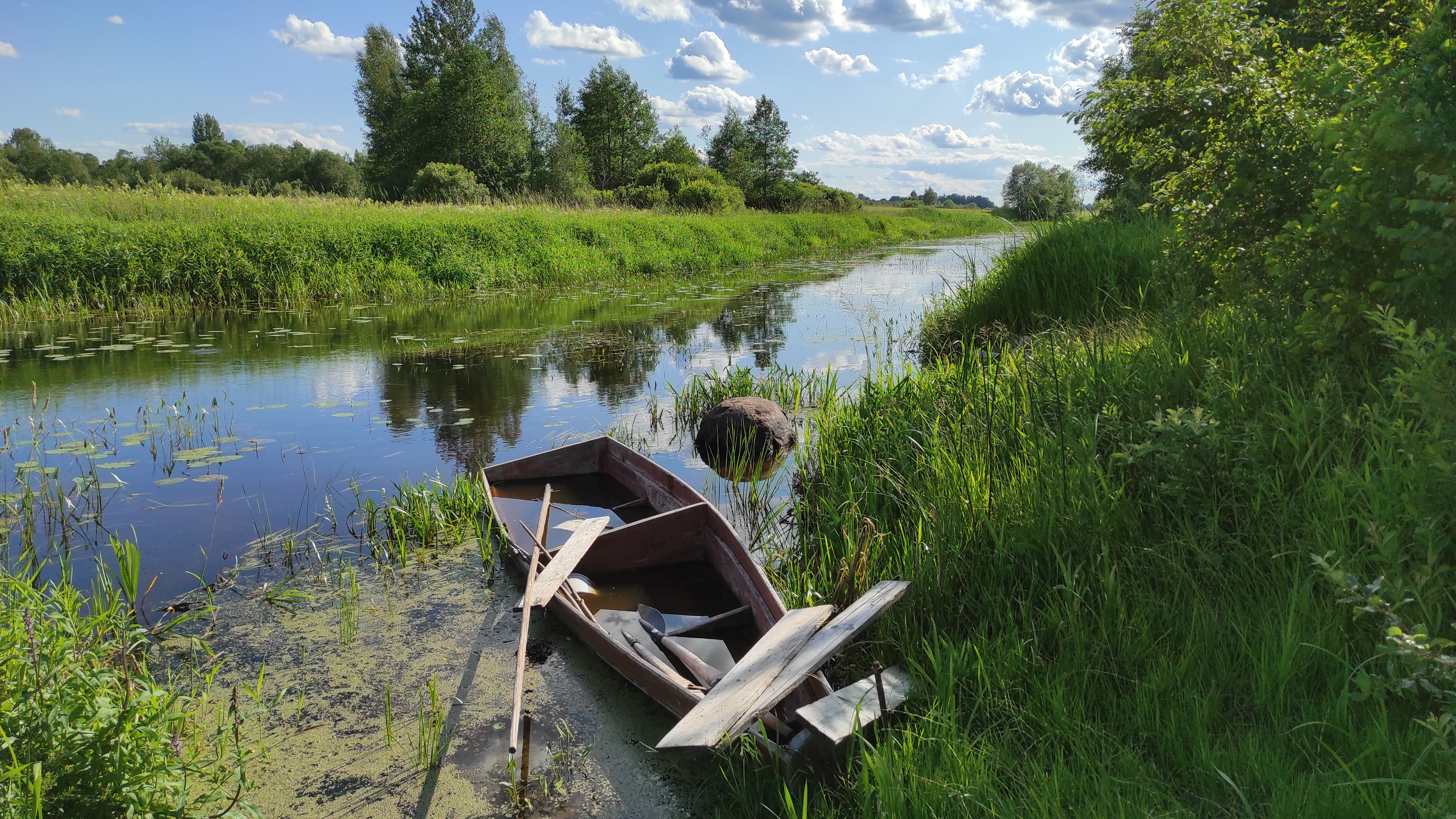

Location
- Country: Russia, Belarus

Physical characteristics
- Mouth: Daugava (Western Dvina)
  - coordinates: 55°26′03″N 30°44′41″E
- Length: 100 km (62 mi)
- Basin size: 2,340 km^{2} (900 sq mi)

Basin features
- Progression: Daugava→ Baltic Sea

The Usvyacha (Russian: Усвяча) is a river in Kunyinsky and Usvyatsky Districts of Pskov Oblast in Russia and in Vitebsk Raion of Vitebsk Region in northern Belarus. A right tributary of the Daugava (the Western Dvina), the Usvyacha is 100 kilometres (62 mi) long, and its basin drains an area of 2,340 square kilometres (900 sq mi).

The source of the Usvyacha is located in the southern part of Kunyinsky District. Usvyacha flows to the north, through Lake Usmynskoye and Lake Ozeron. North of Lake Ozeron, it turns west and flows into Lake Ordosno. This lake is located at the border between Kunyinsky and Usvyatsky Districts. Usvyacha flows out of the lake in the southern direction and enters Lake Usvyaty. The urban-type settlement of Usvyaty is located at the right bank of the Usvyacha north of the lake. South of Lake Usvyaty, the Usvyacha accepts the Ovsyanka from the right and crosses into Belarus. Its mouth is located 3 kilometres (1.9 mi) upstream of the urban-type settlement of Surazh.

The 2,340-km² drainage basin of the Usvyacha includes the center and the southeast of Usvyachsky District, the southwest of Kunyinsky District, the northwest of Velizhsky District of Smolensk Oblast, as well as the northwest of Vitebsk Raion.
