= Vitsyebsk gate =

Coordinates: 55.5°N 30.8°E

In Soviet and Belarusian historiography, the Vitebsk or Surazh gate (Віцебскія вароты or Суражскія вароты) was the name given to the corridor connecting Soviet and German-occupied territories during World War II. The 40 km area between Velizh and Usvyaty was a point of contact between the German Army Groups North and Centre. The gate, created by the Soviet 4th Shock Army Toropets–Kholm Offensive during the winter of 1941–42, existed from 10 February to 28 September 1942.

== Red Army offensive ==
The Soviet 54th Infantry Brigade, participating in the 4th Shock Army offensive, captured the town of Usvyaty during the night of 20 January 1942. In July 1942, it was relieved by the 47th Naval Infantry Division; the 334th Infantry Regiment held western Usvyaty, forming the north border of the Vitebsk gate.

The 360th Infantry Division and the 48th Infantry Brigade, composed of 1,500 men, captured western Velizh and dug in there on 29 January 1942. The 249th Infantry Division and the 51st Infantry Brigade passed Velizh and, in accordance with the order dated 30 December 1942, attacked Surazh. The 51st Infantry Brigade blocked the town from the north while the 249th Infantry Division marched further southwest towards Vitebsk, approaching the city on 3 February 1942. However, both units were too exhausted and undermanned for these tasks. By the time the 249th Infantry Division reached the suburbs of Vitebsk, it had only 1,400 active troops. Fresh German units counterattacked; the 277th Infantry Regiment (part of the 83rd Infantry Division) sent Soviet forces out from Surazh east to the settlement of Ostrovki (Ostrovskie) around 10 February 1942. Other German regiments from the 205th and 330th Infantry Divisions attacked from Vitebsk, forcing the Soviet 249th Infantry Division to retreat quickly after a delayed order. Both Soviet units dug in in the northeast suburbs of Velizh, forming the southern border of the Vitebsk Gate.

The German military ignored the large "hole" in the front because:

1. Lack of troops after the heavy summer-autumn 1941 campaign and Red Army counterstrikes during the winter of 1941-42;
2. Very long front and communications lines, due to numerous salients near Vyazma and Rzhev, for Army Group Centre;
3. Many Army Group North units were assigned to relieve the Demyansk and Kholm Pockets;
4. Both army groups headquarters did not wish to engage in dense forests and swamps with few roads. A Red Army offensive would be fruitless, since the only road leading to fortified Vitebsk (near the south bank of the Western Dvina) was controlled by the Germans. The Red Army did not attempt an offensive after the 249th Infantry Division's retreat in February 1942.

== Partisan control and defense ==
In the swampy forest region 3–5 kilometres (1.9–3.1 mi) north of the Western Dvina, small Soviet units aided by partisan groups led by Ya. Z. Zakharov, M. F. Biryulin, M. I. Dyachkov, M. F. Shmyrev, S. T. Voronov and V. V. Strelkov cleared and controlled a large area with no strategic roads. The front later stabilized, and the 40-kilometer gap in the German defensive line was filled by partisans who destroyed local German garrisons and controlled the villages of Tarasenki, Punische, Galevichi, Ozerki, Ukraytzi, Verechje and Kazakove. The northern Surazhsky District of the Vitebsk Region, near the village of Tarasenki, was the first Belarusian territory liberated by Soviet forces after 1941.

Map of the gate

The corridor opened into poorly-accessible territory, where several partisan units were based who later controlled a 1,600-square-kilometre (620 sq mi) territory (the Surazh partisan area) with 16-17 Soviet village-level, representative local governments and one (Vitebsk) Soviet region-level representative government re-established with a telephone line to the army and government by the USSR. The Soviet political and military command did not recognize the gate's initial possibilities, since significant contact with local partisan units was not established until March 1942. Aiming for the inclusion of the partisan movement in the overall strategy and for the disruption of the German rear in the event of an anticipated 1942 German offensive, a resolution was made (supposedly in March 1942) to create logistical and personnel support for the partisan movement and coordinate its activities. The Northwestern Operational Group was created by the Belarusian Communist Party on 20 March 1942, liaising with the Kalinin Front HQs and the 3rd and 4th Soviet Strike Armies. A partisan headquarters was created under Panteleimon Ponomarenko on 30 May, with a territorial headquarters (under Pyotr Kalinin) created in September 1942. Stalin was unaware of the gate's existence until summer 1942; M. F. Shmyrev reported that he told Stalin about it at a Kremlin meeting with partisan leaders.

The gate was guarded on the south by the 1st Belarusian Partisan Brigade, formed by joining five partisan squads on 8 April 1942 into an initial 300-man force. The brigade later grew to 1,500-2,000, with mortars and cannons, with Minay Fillipovich Shmyrev (nicknamed "Daddy Minay") its commander. Shmyrev, a factory director and World War I veteran, became a partisan commander just before Vitebsk was captured by the Germans. His four children, aged 3 to 14, were taken hostage by the Gestapo in fall 1941 and executed in February 1942. The brigade commander was called to Moscow at the end of November 1942, and its new commander was Ya. Z. Zakharov.

It was guarded on the north by the 2nd Belarusian Partisan Brigade, formed from the Mekhovskiy partisan squad in May 1942 with M. I. Djachkov as commander. The brigade later had 617 men in units armed with mortars, 128 men in HQ, supply and sanitary units, and a separate cavalry reconnaissance unit.

In April 1942 partisan numbers began to grow quickly, aided by a significant influx of personnel (commanding, political, organisational and specialist) and war materiel through the Vitebsk gate. Several thousand trained men were sent to Belarus, most native Belarusians. They were formed into diversion groups; "organiser" groups were communist leaders and agitators, typographical specialists, medics and explosive and diversion instructors. More than 170 groups (about 3,000 men) were sent through the gate, 15 percent of the total Belarus partisan force. The force totaled 20,050: 265 partisan squad commanders, 549 underground resistance organisers, 1,146 explosive instructors, 23 chemistry instructors, about 15,000 sabotage and diversion specialists, 11 underwater diversion specialists, 457 radio operators, 252 scouts, 52 printing-shop specialists and 12 newspaper editors.

== Transport through the gate ==
More than 5,000 firearms, tens of millions of cartridges, hundreds of tons of explosives, machine guns, typographical and printing machinery, millions of copies of Soviet newspapers and other propaganda material flowed through the gate to occupied Belarus. About 150 radio transmitters were moved into Belarus through the gate from April to September 1942. Materiel and personnel entering the Vitebsk region through the gate were distributed throughout Belarus according to instructions issued from headquarters.

The gate also worked in the opposite direction, allowing transport out of Belarus. About 20,000-25,000 Red Army conscripts, 200,000 refugees, 1,600 tonnes of grain, 10,000 tonnes of potatoes and other vegetables, food products, livestock and 2,500 horses were moved out of German-occupied territory through the Gate.

In anticipation of the gate's closure, specialists were sent to Belarus to build airstrips. Nearly 50 covert airstrips and many airdrop sites were built during the war, facilitating logistical support of the partisan movement from the "mainland" (Russian: Большая земля).

== German destruction ==
German forces launched a large, well-planned army operation on the night of 25 September 1942. It began as a three-pronged offensive from the south: from Vitebsk to Kurino, from Surazh to Tarasenki and westward from Kraslevichi (near Velizh). After meeting at the Usvyacha River, the forces turned north. The offensive's aim was to seize the main forest belt forest road, which runs along the west bank of the Usvyacha from the Western Dvina in the south to the town of Usvyaty via the villages of Tarasenki, Pudat' and Shershni.

Heavy fighting occurred near the villages of Punishe, Buly and Pudat' and further north, near Myaliny, Shmyri and Drozdy. By the night of 27–28 September, German artillery and tanks had taken all the villages. German forces from the north cleared the Velikie Luki-Usvyaty road that night, launching a synchronized 10-kilometre-long (6.2 mi) southward strike along the Usvyacha towards Shershni.

German forces captured the villages of Karpenkino, Shmyri and Shershni the next day, meeting the force striking from the south and closing the Vitsyebsk gate. The occupiers burned several other villages in a punitive expedition around the area. The 334th Regiment of the Red Army 47th Infantry Division on the gate's north side (at Usvyaty) was attacked by the Germans on 30 September, but held its ground. A monument to the partisans killed during these fights was erected in 1977 near the village of Zapol'e.

== Historical importance ==
The gate was the largest and most-important example of how one side can use a "hole" in a front to develop a partisan movement in occupied territory. Experience gained by the Soviets from the Vitebsk gate was used several times in 1944 for partisan supply operations in Belarus and Ukraine. The Ho Chi Minh Trail in Laos during the Vietnam War had an even greater importance, growing around 1975 to a 2,000-kilometre-long (1,200 mi) system of all-weather roads, an oil pipeline and telecommunications lines.

This experience may be used in future wars under two conditions: a partisan war and wide, uncontrolled "holes" in a front. Belarusian artist Mikhail Savitsky painted Vitebsk Gate in 1967, depicting refugees crossing the gate.

== Sources ==
- Jerzy Turonek. Białoruś pod okupacją niemiecką. Warszawa—Wrocław: WERS, 1989. 186 p., ill.
- Витебские (Суражские) ворота (in Russian) http://www.pobeda.witebsk.by/land/epizode/suraj
