= Minay Shmyryov =

Soviet Belarusian guerrilla (1891–1964)

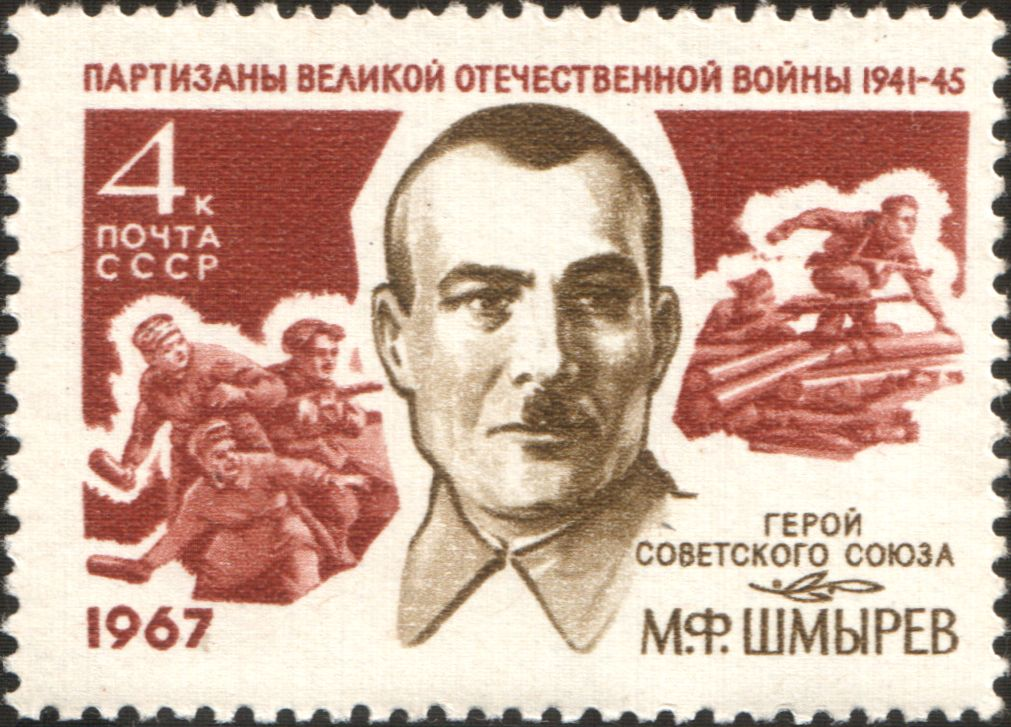
- Shmyryov on a 1967 Soviet stamp
- Native name: Мінай Піліпавіч Шмыроў
- Born: 23 December 1891; Punishche, Vitebsk Governorate, Russian Empire (now Belarus)
- Died: 3 September 1964 (aged 72)
- Allegiance: Russian Empire; Russian SFSR; Soviet Union
- Branch: Imperial Russian Army; Red Army; Soviet partisans
- Service years: 1917–1923; 1941–1944
- Conflicts: World War I; Russian Civil War; World War II; Belarusian resistance

Minay Filippovich Shmyryov (Belarusian: Міна́й Пілі́павіч Шмыро́ў, romanized: Minaj Pilipavič Šmyroŭ, Russian: Мина́й Фили́ппович Шмырёв; 23 December 1891 – 3 September 1964), also transliterated as Minay Shmyrev and Minai Shmyrev, was one of the leaders of the Belarusian partisan resistance against the German occupation during World War II.

Shmyryov was decorated as a Hero of the Soviet Union for his wartime role in the Byelorussian Soviet Socialist Republic in 1944.

== Early life and career ==
The son of a peasant family from Punishche, a Belarusian village near Vitebsk (then part of the Russian Empire's Vitebsk Governorate), Shmyryov was born on 23 December 1891, and began working at age eight in order to help support his elementary education, which he completed in 1902.

Drafted into the Imperial Russian Army in 1913, a year before the outbreak of World War I, Shmyryov saw action as an artilleryman, receiving the Cross of St. George, the Empire's award for heroism, a total of three times. Sent home from the front when his unit was disbanded in response to growing revolutionary sentiment among its soldiers, Shmyryov made his way back during the Russian revolutionary period in 1917. Sympathetic to the Bolsheviks' October Revolution, Shmyryov participated the struggle for the establishment of Bolshevik power in his native province, whose peasants soon elected him to a position on a land distribution executive committee.

At first a quartermaster for the Red Army in battles against the White Guard during the Russian Civil War, Shmyryov became a member of the Russian Communist Party (Bolsheviks) in 1920, but returned home the same year after falling ill during the wartime epidemic of typhus, and was appointed to head a local unit tasked with the struggle against "lawlessness" from 1920 to 1923. His brother and father were both killed during the local period of local White Terror. His service earned him the Order of the Red Banner in 1923.

Shmyryov started his own family and took part in various endeavors after the Bolshevik victory in the Civil War. Following the implementation of the Soviet collectivization campaign, Shmyryov was elected a kolkhoz chairman in 1933. By the outbreak of war between the Germans and the Soviet Union, Shmyryov had been made director of a cardboard factory.

== Partisan leadership ==
The invasion of the Soviet Union by Nazi Germany began on 22 June 1941. On 5 July, the Communist Party of the Soviet Union's regional committee appointed Shmyryov to begin forming a partisan group to operate in the region between eastern Belarus and the adjacent Bryansk Oblast in western Russia. On 11 July, Vitebsk fell. Having found its first twenty-five members within a week, Shmyryov's group disappeared into the local forests on 12 July.

On 25 July, Shmyryov's partisan group set an ambush against mounted Wehrmacht soldiers. By September 1941, the size of the group had increased to a total of seventy-five partisans. From July 1941 until October, the group had blown up 30 bridges and killed 250 soldiers and officers while seizing more supplies and weapons for continued operations from the forests.

Despite Shmyryov's attempt to evacuate his children at the beginning of the war, they were turned back, overrun by the advancing Blitzkrieg. Having unsuccessfully attempted to obtain helpful intelligence regarding the location of Shmyryov's partisans from the local villagers, the Nazis responded by seizing them as hostages at Surazh in the autumn of 1941. After four months of continued resistance by Shmyryov, his children were executed on 14 February 1942.

=== 1st Byelorussian Partisan Brigade ===
With the successes of the Soviet Army's offensive near Smolensk in the winter of 1942, a 40-kilometer-wide breach – the "Vitsyebsk gate" – was opened between the German lines, enabling direct contact between the partisans, the Communist Party, and the Soviet Army. Seeking to establish coordination between the partisans and the army, on 4 April 1942, Shmyryov's staff was visited by representatives of the 4th Shock Army and the Communist Party of Byelorussia's Central Committee. Independent local groups of partisans were united as the 300-member 1st Byelorussian Partisan Brigade under Shmyryov as commanding officer. By September the brigade had grown to number about 2000 partisans.

With the development of centrally-directed partisan operations, Shmyryov was ordered to Moscow to become a member of the Partisans' Central Staff in November 1942. He was awarded the honorary title of Hero of the Soviet Union on 15 August 1944, during the last days of Operation Bagration, whose conclusion signalled the complete liberation of the last of the remaining German-held Belarusian territory.

== Post-war ==
Already a local legend during his lifetime, Shmyryov became the first Honored Citizen of Vitebsk after World War II and was paid homage in various books and partisan recollections of the wartime years. His own memoirs appeared in 1961.

Again active in public life after returning home following the Soviet successes at the close of the war, Shmyryov was elected to the Supreme Soviet of the Byelorussian SSR. He died on 3 September 1964 and was survived by his last wife (died 1998) and the children from their post-war marriage.

== Memory ==
Various schools and streets in the Vitebsk area were given Shmyryov's name, as was a newly developed variety of blackcurrant in 1967.

Shmyryov's portrait was featured on a postage stamp in the 1967 series of stamps honoring the greatest heroes of the partisan resistance movement.

A monument to the memory of Shmyryov's four children was set up in the town of Surazh in 1985.

== In other media ==
Minay Shmyryov was discussed on episode 34 of the podcast The Wikicast, where host Simon Clark nicknamed Shmyryov the 'Robin Hood of Belarus'.
