= Territorial evolution of Russia =

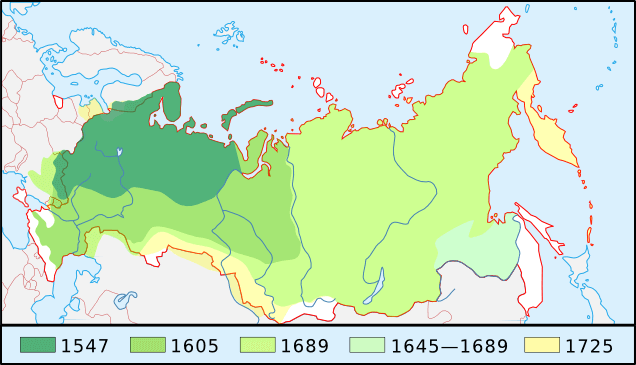
Evolution of Russia between 1547 and 1725

The borders of Russia changed through military conquests and by ideological and political unions from the 16th century.

== Tsarist Russia ==
The formal end to Tatar rule over Russia was the defeat of the Tatars at the Great Stand on the Ugra River in 1480. Ivan III (r. 1462–1505) and Vasili III (r. 1505–1533) had consolidated the centralized Russian state following the annexations of the Novgorod Republic in 1478, Tver in 1485, the Pskov Republic in 1510, Volokolamsk in 1513, Ryazan in 1521, and Novgorod-Seversk in 1522.

Brian L. Davies suggests that Moscow's ultimate advantage was the comparative absence of restraints on its ability to command resources for war.

=== 1550–1618: Down the Volga ===
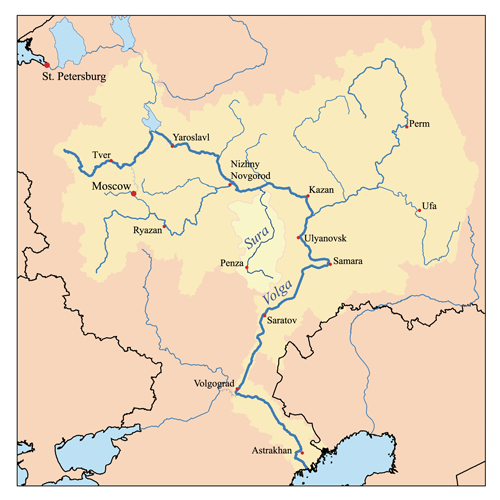
Moscow, Kazan, and Astrakhan

There were numerous Russo-Kazan wars, usually involving rival claimants for the throne of the Khanate of Kazan on the Middle Volga, and Moscow intervening in Kazan's internal wars of succession in order to uphold the dynastic interests of the Crimean Khan. It was not until 1519 that Moscow attempted to put its own claimant on the throne rather than backing the Crimean candidate, for which the Crimean Tatars punished the Muscovites with a devastating campaign in 1521, after which Moscow relented, recognised the Crimean claimant, and resumed its tribute to the Crimean Khanate.

=== Expansion into Asia and the Caucasus ===
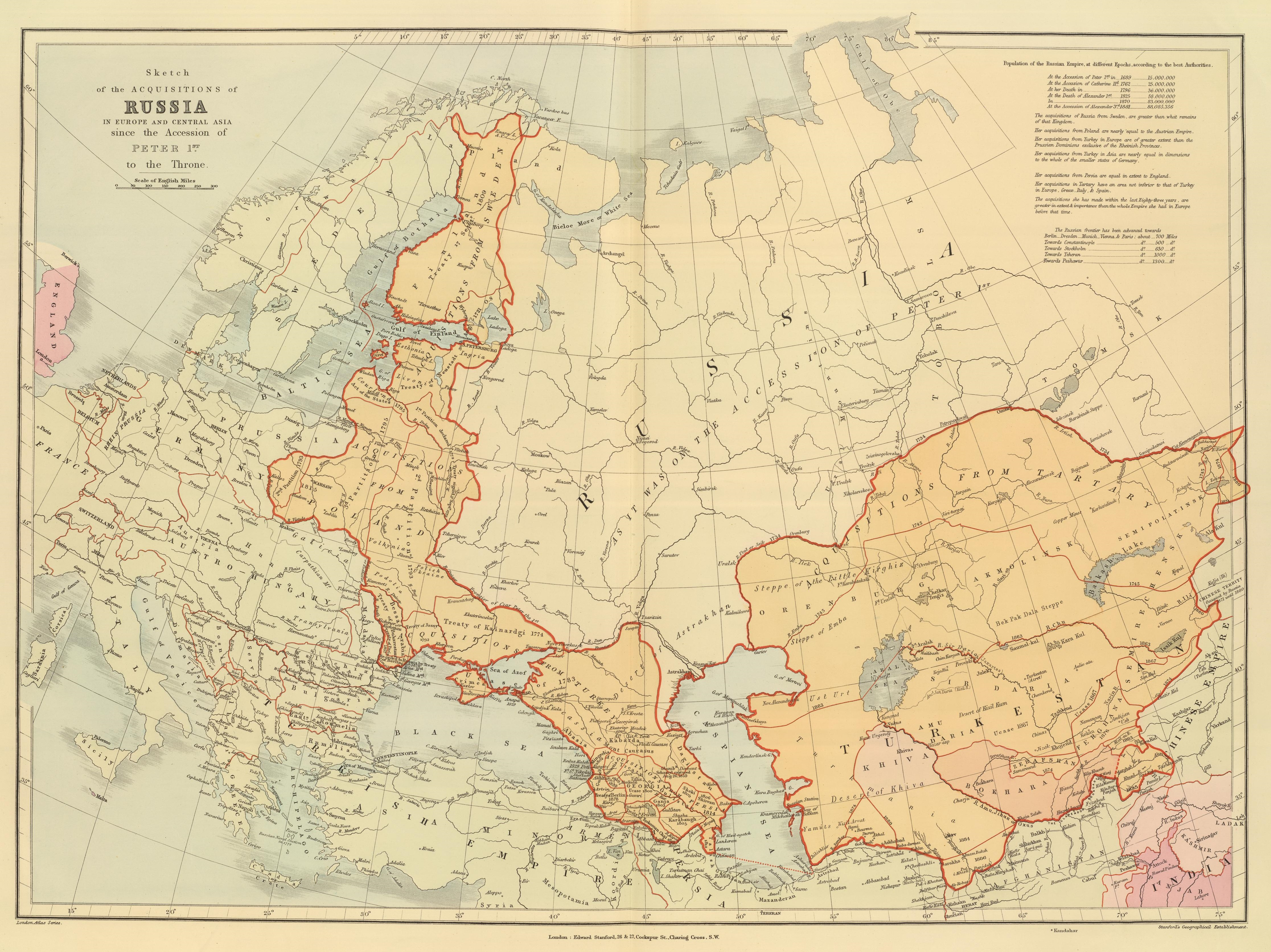
Russian expansion in Europe and Western Asia between 1700 and 1900

After the Romanovs came to power, Russian expansion continued for centuries; by the end of the 19th century, the Russian Empire reached from the Baltic Sea, to the Black Sea, to the Pacific Ocean, and for some time included colonies in the Americas (1732–1867) and an unofficial colony in Africa (1889) in present-day Djibouti.

The first stage from 1582 to 1650 resulted in northeastern expansion from the Urals to the Pacific. Geographical expeditions mapped much of Siberia. The second stage from 1785 to 1830 looked South to the areas between the Black Sea and the Caspian Sea. The key areas were Armenia and Georgia, with some better penetration of the Ottoman Empire, and Persia. By 1829, Russia controlled all of the Caucasus as shown in the Treaty of Adrianople of 1829. The third era, 1850 to 1860, was a brief interlude jumping to the east coast, annexing the region from the Amur River to Manchuria. The fourth era, 1865 to 1885 incorporated Turkestan, and the northern approaches to India, sparking British fears of a threat to India in the Great Game.

Historian Michael Khodarkovsky describes Tsarist Russia as a "hybrid empire" that combined elements of continental and colonial empires. According to Kazakh scholar Kereihan Amanzholov, Russian colonialism had "no essential difference with the colonialist policies of Britain, France, and other European powers". Qing China defeated Russia in the early Sino-Russian border conflicts, although the Russian Empire later acquired Outer Manchuria in the Amur Annexation through the 1858 Treaty of Aigun from China. During the Boxer Rebellion, the Russian Empire invaded Manchuria in 1900, and the Blagoveshchensk massacre occurred against Chinese residents on the Russian side of the border.

=== Table of changes ===
Changes in territory to the Tsardom of Russia and Russian Empire, from 1547 to 1905, listed chronologically:

Year	Tsar	Territory taken	Taken from/by	Background	Map
1552	Ivan the Terrible	Khanate of Kazan	Khanate of Kazan	Russo-Kazan Wars	Location of Kazan
1556	Ivan the Terrible	Astrakhan Khanate	Astrakhan Khanate	Russian control of the Volga trade route	Location of Astrakhan
1562	Ivan the Terrible	Nevel	Grand Duchy of Lithuania	Livonian War	Territorial evolution of Russia is located in European Russia
1563	Ivan the Terrible	Polotsk and Velizh	Grand Duchy of Lithuania	Livonian War	Territorial evolution of Russia is located in European Russia
1566	Ivan the Terrible	Usvyaty	Grand Duchy of Lithuania	Livonian War	Territorial evolution of Russia is located in European Russia
1580	Ivan the Terrible	Loss of Usvyaty	Polish–Lithuanian Commonwealth	Livonian War	
1582	Ivan the Terrible	Loss of Polotsk and Velizh	Polish–Lithuanian Commonwealth	Livonian War	
1585	Feodor I of Russia	Sevsk	Polish–Lithuanian Commonwealth		Territorial evolution of Russia is located in European Russia
1598	Feodor I of Russia	Khanate of Sibir	Khanate of Sibir	Conquest of the Khanate of Sibir	Khanate of Sibir
1582 – 1778	Various	Siberia	Indigenous people	Russian conquest of Siberia	
1617	Time of Troubles	Loss of Ingria and Kexholm County	Sweden	Ingrian War	
1618	Time of Troubles	Loss of Severia, Smolensk region, Sebezh and Nevel	Polish–Lithuanian Commonwealth	Russo-Polish War (1609-1618)	
1634	Michael I of Russia	Town of Serpeysk	Polish–Lithuanian Commonwealth	Smolensk War	
1644	Michael I of Russia	Town of Trubchevsk	Polish–Lithuanian Commonwealth		Territorial evolution of Russia is located in European Russia
1667	Alexis of Russia	Smolensk, Left-bank Ukraine, Kiev (temporary), Zaporizhzhia (condominium with Poland)	Polish–Lithuanian Commonwealth	Russo-Polish War (1654–1667)	Truce of Andrusovo 1667
1681	Feodor III of Russia	Qasim Khanate	Qasim Khanate	Death of Queen Fatima Soltan	Location of Qasim Khanate
1686	Peter the Great	Gain of Kiev and Zaporizhzhia	Polish–Lithuanian Commonwealth	Union with Poland against Ottoman Empire (Great Turkish War)	Union with Poland against Turkey
1700	Peter the Great	Gain of Azov (temporary)	Ottoman Empire	Russo-Turkish War (1686-1700) (During the Great Turkish War)	Territorial evolution of Russia is located in European Russia
1711	Peter the Great	Loss of Azov	Ottoman Empire	Russo-Turkish War (1710-1711)	
1721	Peter the Great	Livonia, Estonia, Ingria, and Karelia	Sweden	Great Northern War	Treaty of Nystad
1723	Peter the Great	Derbent, Baku, Shirvan, Gilan, Mazandaran, and Astarabad	Guarded Domains of Iran	Russo-Persian War (1722–1723)	Treaty of Constantinople
1732	Anna of Russia	Loss of Derbent, Baku, Shirvan, Gilan, Mazandaran, and Astarabad	Guarded Domains of Iran	Russo-Turkish War (1735–1739)	
1739	Anna of Russia	Regain of Azov	Ottoman Empire	Russo-Turkish War (1735-1739)	
1743	Elizabeth of Russia	South-western Karelia	Sweden	Russo-Swedish War (1741–1743)	Treaty of Åbo
1758	Elizabeth of Russia	Sambia, Lithuania Minor, Natangia	Kingdom of Prussia	Seven Years' War	
1762	Peter III	Loss of Sambia, Lithuania Minor, Natangia	Kingdom of Prussia	Miracle of the House of Brandenburg	
1771	Catherine the Great	Kalmyk Khanate	Kalmyk Khanate	exodus of the Kalmyks to Dzungaria	Location of Kalmyk Khanate
1772	Catherine the Great	Inflanty Voivodeship and parts of historic White Ruthenia (modern eastern Belarus, and Nevel, Rudnya, Sebezh, Shumyachi, Usvyaty, Velizh)	Polish–Lithuanian Commonwealth	First Partition of Poland	First Partition of Poland
1774	Catherine the Great	Southern Bug and Karbadino	Ottoman Empire	Russo-Turkish War (1768–1774)	Crimean Khanate (in yellow)
1783	Catherine the Great	Crimean Khanate	Ottoman Empire	Annexation of the vassal state	Crimean Khanate (in yellow)
1792	Catherine the Great	Yedisan	Ottoman Empire	Russo-Turkish War (1787–1792)	Location of Yedisan
1793	Catherine the Great	Right-bank Ukraine, most of Podolia, eastern Volhynia and Belarus	Polish–Lithuanian Commonwealth	Second Partition of Poland	Second Partition of Poland
1795	Catherine the Great	Courland, Semigalia, Samogitia, Kaunas, Vilnius, western Polesie and Volhynia	Polish–Lithuanian Commonwealth	Third Partition of Poland	Partitions of Poland
1799	Paul I of Russia	Alaska	Indigenous people	Russian America	Russian Alaska in 1860
1801	Alexander I of Russia	Eastern Georgia	Kingdom of Kartli-Kakheti	Annexation of Georgia	Eastern Georgia
1807	Alexander I of Russia	Białystok	Kingdom of Prussia	Napoleonic Wars	
1809	Alexander I of Russia	Tarnopol	Austrian Empire	War of the Fifth Coalition	
1809	Alexander I of Russia	Grand Duchy of Finland	Sweden	Finnish War	Grand Duchy of Finland
1810	Alexander I of Russia	Western Georgia	Kingdom of Imereti	Annexation of Georgia	
1812	Alexander I of Russia	Loss of Lithuania (temporary)	General Confederation of the Kingdom of Poland	French invasion of Russia	
1812	Alexander I of Russia	Bessarabia (Moldova)	Ottoman Empire	Russo-Turkish War (1806–1812)	Location of Bessarbia
1813	Alexander I of Russia	Duchy of Warsaw (Under occupation)	France	Napoleonic Wars	Duchy of Warsaw
1813	Alexander I of Russia	Georgia, Dagestan, parts of northern Azerbaijan, and parts of northern Armenia	Sublime State of Persia	Russo-Persian War (1804–1813)	Losses by Persia
1815	Alexander I of Russia	Congress Poland	Duchy of Warsaw	Napoleonic Wars	
1815	Alexander I of Russia	Loss of Tarnopol	Austrian Empire	Napoleonic Wars	
1828	Nicholas I of Russia	Iğdır Province, rest of northern Azerbaijan, and Armenia	Sublime State of Persia	Russo-Persian War (1826–1828)	Losses by Persia
1829	Nicholas l of Russia	Danube Delta, Anapa, Novorossiysk, Poti, Akhaltsikhe and Akhalkalaki	Ottoman Empire	Russo-Turkish War (1828-1829)	
1856	Alexander II of Russia	Loss of Danube Delta and Southern Bessarabia	Principality of Moldavia (Ottoman Empire)	Crimean War	
1858	Alexander II of Russia	North of the Amur River	Qing Empire (China)	Second Opium War	Convention of Peking
1859	Alexander II of Russia	Caucasian Imamate	Caucasian Imamate	Caucasian War	
1860	Alexander II of Russia	East of the Ussuri River	Qing Empire (China)	Second Opium War	Convention of Peking
1730–1863	gradual	Kazakhstan	Lesser Horde, Middle Horde, Great Horde	Incorporation of the Kazakh Khanate	Kazakhstan
1864	Alexander II of Russia	Circassia	Circassians	Caucasian War	
1866	Alexander II of Russia	Uzbekistan	Emirate of Bukhara	Russian conquest of Bukhara	conquest of Uzbekistan
1867	Alexander II of Russia	Loss of Alaska	United States of America	Alaska Purchase	Russian Alaska in 1860
1873	Alexander II of Russia	North Turkmenistan	Khanate of Khiva	Khivan campaign of 1873	conquest of Turkmenistan
1875	Alexander II of Russia	Sakhalin	Empire of Japan	border settlement with Japan	Sakhalin and Kuril islands
1876	Alexander II of Russia	Kyrgyzstan and West Tajikistan	Khanate of Kokand	Annexation of the vassal state	conquest of Kokand
1878	Alexander II of Russia	Regain of Southern Bessarabia	Ottoman Empire	Russo-Turkish War (1877–1878)	
1878	Alexander II of Russia	Kars Oblast and Batum Oblast	Ottoman Empire	Russo-Turkish War (1877–1878)	Kars and Batumi
1885	Alexander III of Russia	South Turkmenistan	Turkmens	Turkmen campaign	Turkmen campaign of 1880–85 * Blue=Russian fort; Yellow=Khanate of Khiva.
1895	Alexander III of Russia	East Tajikistan	sparsely populated	Exploration of the Pamir plateau	Pamir region
1905	Nicholas II of Russia	Loss of South Sakhalin	Empire of Japan	Russo-Japanese War	South Sakhalin

== Russian SFSR and Soviet Union ==
After the October Revolution of November 1917, Poland and Finland became independent from Russia and remained so thereafter. The Russian Empire ceased to exist, and the Russian SFSR, 1917–1991, was established on much of its territory. Its area of effective direct control varied greatly during the Russian Civil War of 1917 to 1922. Eventually the revolutionary Bolshevik government regained control of most of the former Eurasian lands of the Russian Empire, and in 1922 joined the Russian SFSR to Belarus, Transcaucasia, and Ukraine as the four constituent republics of a new state, the Union of Soviet Socialist Republics (USSR), which lasted until December 1991. In the Caucasus, in 1921, the Kars Oblast and southern Batum Oblast (gained by the Russian Empire in 1878) were ceded back to Turkey by the Treaty of Kars.

Map of territorial changes in Europe after World War I (as of 1923)

Territories of the former Russian Empire that permanently or temporarily became independent:

- Alash Autonomy, 1917–1920
- Republic of Aras, 1918–1919
- First Republic of Armenia, 1918–1920
- Republic of Mountainous Armenia, 1921
- Azerbaijan Democratic Republic, 1918–1920
- Balagad state, 1919–1926
- Belarusian Democratic Republic, 1918–1919
- Socialist Soviet Republic of Byelorussia, 1919
- Mountainous Republic of the Northern Caucasus, 1917–1920
- North Caucasian Emirate, 1919–1920
- Provisional National Government of the Southwestern Caucasus, 1918–1919
- Transcaucasian Democratic Federative Republic, 1918
- Centrocaspian Dictatorship, 1918
- Duchy of Courland and Semigallia (1918), 1918
- Crimean People's Republic, 1917–1918
- Don Republic, 1918–1920
- Eastern Okraina, 1920
- Far Eastern Republic, 1920–1922
- Republic of Finland, 1917–present
- Kingdom of Finland (1918), 1918–1919
- Democratic Republic of Georgia, 1918–1921
- North Ingria, 1919–1920
- Kuban People's Republic, 1918–1920
- Republic of Latvia, 1919–1940
- Kingdom of Lithuania (1918), 1918
- Lithuanian Soviet Socialist Republic (1918–1919)
- Socialist Soviet Republic of Lithuania and Belorussia, 1919–1920
- Republic of Central Lithuania, 1920–1922
- Moldavian Democratic Republic, 1917–1918
- Second Polish Republic 1918–1939
- Russian Republic, 1917–1918
- Russian Soviet Federative Socialist Republic, 1917–1991, co-founder of the Soviet Union in December 1922
- Russian State (1918–1920)
- Ukrainian People's Republic, 1917–1921
- Ukrainian State, 1918

In 1919, northern Mhlyn, Novozybkiv, Starodub, and Surazh counties (povits) of Ukraine's Chernihiv Governorate were transferred from the Ukrainian SSR to the new Gomel Governorate of the Russian republic. In February 1924, Tahanrih and Shakhtinsky counties (okruhas) were transferred from the Donetsk Governorate of Ukraine to Russia's North Caucasus krai.

By the end of World War II the Soviet Union had annexed:

USSR Republics numbered by alphabet 1 Armenia, 2 Azerbaijan, 3 Belarus, 4 Estonia, 5 Georgia, 6 Kazakhstan, 7 Kyrgyzstan, 8 Latvia, 9 Lithuania, 10 Moldova, 11 Russia, 12 Tajikistan, 13 Turkmenistan, 14 Ukraine, 15 Uzbekistan

- the Kresy (modern Western Belarus and Western Ukraine) from the Second Polish Republic (see Territories of Poland annexed by the Soviet Union), annexed in September–October 1939
- Estonia, Latvia, and Lithuania, occupied in August 1940
- Bessarabia (Moldova), Hertsa, and part of Bukovina, occupied from Romania after an ultimatum in 1940
- Parts of Karelia and Salla in 1940, Pechengsky Raion (Petsamo) in 1944, from Finland and a 50-year lease on the naval base at Porkkala in 1944
- Carpathian Ruthenia, formerly in Czechoslovakia and occupied in 1944
- Tuva (independent 1921–1944; previously governed by Mongolia and by the Manchu Empire)
- Part of East Prussia (now Kaliningrad Oblast) from Nazi Germany, in 1945
- The Klaipėda Region, re-annexed to Lithuania in 1945
- The Kuril Islands and southern Sakhalin from Japan, occupied in 1945

Of these, Pechenga, Salla, Tuva, Kaliningrad Oblast, the Kurils, and Sakhalin were added to the territory of the RSFSR.

In late 1945, Soviet Russia annexed the northern border strip of the Masurian District (current southern border strip of Kaliningrad Oblast) with the towns of Gierdawy (now Zheleznodorozhny) and Iławka (now Bagrationovsk) from Poland and expelled the already formed local Polish administration.

The Chinese Eastern Railway, formerly a tsarist concession, was taken again by the Soviet Union after the 1929 Sino-Soviet conflict, the railway was returned in 1952.

Meanwhile, territories were removed from the Russian SFSR, including Turkmenistan and Uzbekistan in 1924, Kazakhstan and Kyrgyzstan in 1936, and Karelo-Finland from 1945 to 1956. The Crimean oblast and city of Sevastopol were transferred to Ukraine on 19 February 1954 (later annexed by the Russian Federation in 2014).

There were numerous minor border changes between Soviet republics as well.

After World War II, the Soviet Union set up seven satellite states, in which local politics, military, and foreign and domestic policies were dominated by the Soviet Union:

- People's Socialist Republic of Albania (until 1961)
- People's Republic of Bulgaria
- Czechoslovak Socialist Republic
- German Democratic Republic
- Hungarian People's Republic
- Polish People's Republic
- Socialist Republic of Romania (until 1965)

The Soviet Union also administered the northern half of Korea after the surrender of Japan. Although not a Union Republic, this polity then declared independence from the Soviet Union on 10 July 1948 as the Democratic People's Republic of Korea.

== Russian Federation ==
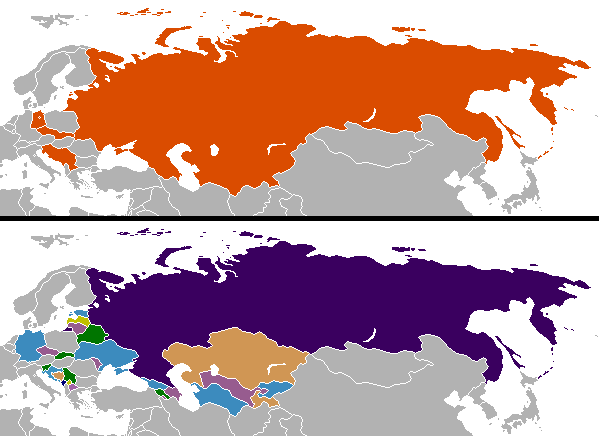
Changes in national boundaries after the end of the Cold War and after the dissolution of the Soviet Union

Map showing the annexed Ukrainian oblasts per Russian claims in yellow, with a red line marking the area of actual control by Russia on 30 September 2022.

The dissolution of the Soviet Union has led to the creation of independent post-Soviet states, with the Russian SFSR declaring its independence in December 1991 and changing its name to the Russian Federation.

The Chechen Republic of Ichkeria was a secessionist government of the Chechen Republic during 1991–2000. After Russian defeat at the Battle of Grozny, the First Chechen War ended with Russia recognizing the new Ichkerian government of president Maskhadov in January 1997 and signing a peace treaty in May. But Russia invaded again in 1999, restoring a Chechen Republic and the Ichkeria government was exiled in 2000.

The Russian Federation has been involved in territorial disputes with several its neighbours, including with Japan over the Kuril Islands, with Latvia over the Pytalovsky Raion (settled in 1997), with China over parts of Tarabarov Island and Bolshoy Ussuriysky Island (settled in 2001), with its coastal neighbours over Caspian Sea boundaries, and with Estonia over the adjoining border. Russia also had disputes with Ukraine over the status of the federal city of Sevastopol, but agreed it belonged to Ukraine in the 1997 Russian–Ukrainian Friendship Treaty, and over the uninhabited Tuzla Island, but gave up this claim in the 2003 Treaty on the Sea of Azov and the Kerch Strait.

The Russian Federation has also used its armed forces, armed formations, and material support to help establish the disputed breakaway states of Transnistria in Moldova after the Transnistria War, and South Ossetia and Abkhazia, after the 2008 war in Georgia. In 2008, shortly after announcing the recognition of Abkhazia and South Ossetia, Russian president Dmitry Medvedev laid out a foreign policy challenging the US-dominated "single-pole" world order and claiming a privileged sphere of influence in the near abroad around the Russian Federation and farther abroad. Following these conflicts, both Transnistria and South Ossetia have made proposals for joining Russia.

In 2014, when after months of protests in Ukraine, pro-Russian Ukrainian president Viktor Yanukovych was deposed in the Revolution of Dignity, Russian troops occupied Ukraine's Crimean peninsula, and after a hasty referendum the Kremlin annexed Crimea and Sevastopol. The annexation was not recognized by Ukraine or most other members of the international community. A few weeks later, an armed conflict broke out the Donbas region of Ukraine, in which the Kremlin denies an active role, but is widely considered to be fuelled by soldiers, militants, weapons, and ammunition from the Russian Federation.

On February 21, 2022, the Russian president Vladimir Putin signed a decree recognizing the independence of two Donbas republics in Ukraine, and invaded the region. Two days later, Russian troops openly invaded Ukrainian-held territory of Ukraine, a move widely seen as an attempt to conduct regime change and occupy much or all of Ukraine. After failing to seize Ukraine's capital Kyiv for over a month, the Russian defence minister stated that the main goal of the war was the "liberation of the Donbas", but later a Russian general stated that it was to seize eastern and southern Ukraine right through to Transnistria, a breakaway territory in Moldova.

On 30 September 2022, Putin announced in a speech that Russia was to annex four partially occupied regions of Ukraine: Donetsk, Kherson, Luhansk, and Zaporizhzhia Oblasts. However, Russia's annexation of these territories was widely condemned by the international community, and Russia does not control the full territory of any of the four annexed regions, and its government was unable to describe the new international "borders".

== Comparative history ==
In 1978, William Hardy McNeill gave a series of lectures called 'The Great Frontier', in which he suggested that the expansion of Europe created a worldwide frontier zone that can be studied as a unit. Specifically, he suggested that the Russo-Polish frontier in the east can be studied along with the Trans-Atlantic frontier in the west.

== See also ==
- Chechen–Russian conflict
- Foreign policy of the Russian Empire
- Foundations of Geopolitics
- History of the administrative division of Russia
- Internal colonialism
- Kaliningrad question
- Karelian question
- Moscow, third Rome
- Post-Soviet conflicts
- Russian imperialism
- Russian irredentism
  - Near abroad
  - Russian-occupied territories
- Russification
- Derussification
- Soviet Empire
- Timeline of geopolitical changes
- List of national border changes from 1815 to 1914
- List of national border changes (1914–present)
- List of largest empires
- List of Russian explorers
