= 1st Belarusian Partisan Brigade =

- Flag of the Soviet Union
- Active: 1942-1943 (Merged with the Red Army)
- Country: Soviet Union
- Allegiance: Red Army
- Type: Partisan
- Role: Sabotage
- Size: 300 (Initial Number during guarding Vitsyebsk gate); 1,500-2,500 (Later strength)
- Engagements: Eastern Front (World War II); Vitsyebsk gate

Commanders
- Notable commanders: Minay Shmyryov

The 1st Belarusian Partisan Brigade (Russian: 1-я белорусская партизанская бригада) (Belarusian: 1-я Беларуская партызанская брыгада) was a Soviet partisan formation active during the Eastern Front of World War II within the German-occupied territories of the Byelorussian SSR. Founded on April 8, 1942, in the Vitebsk Region, the Brigade served as a foundation of the Belarusian resistance movement, growing from small partisan detachments into a cohesive partisan brigade.

== Organization ==
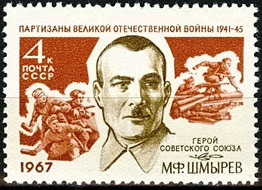
The brigade commander was Minay Shmyryov, who led sabotage operations with the brigade.

The Brigade was initially formed under Minay Shmyryov and Commissar R.V Shkrendo. It originated from several independent detachments, even from Shmyryov's own unit, which had been active since July 1941.

As the resistance grew, the brigade served as a "parent" unit for several other formations. Between 1942 and 1943, several partisan detachments were detached from the brigade to form new units, including the V.I. Lenin Sabotage Brigade, the Red Banner Leninist Komsomol Brigade, and the 1st Vitebsk Partisan Brigade.

== Combat operations ==
The Brigade primarily operated within the Vitebsk, Surazh , and Gorodok districts. One of its most strategic contributions was the defense of the Vitsyebsk Gate, a 40 Kilometer gap in the frontline between Army Group "North" and Army Group "Center".

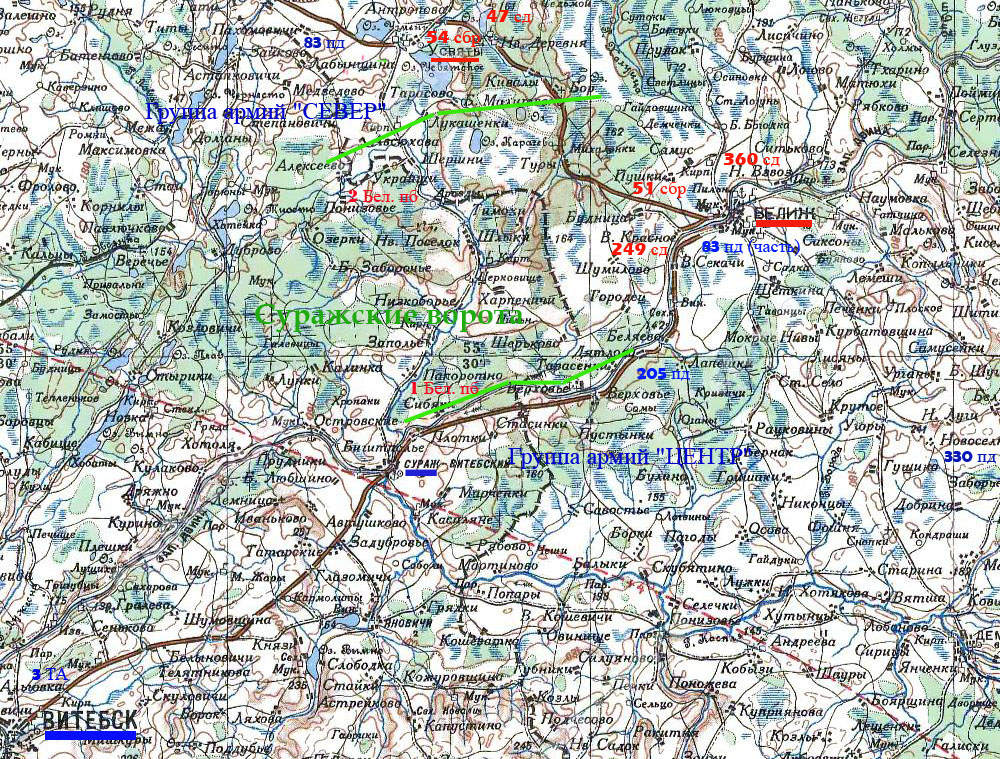
The 1st Belarusian Partisan Brigade guarded the Southern part of the gate.

For 6 months in 1942, the "Gate" provided a vital corridor between the occupied territory and the soviet mainland. Through this, the partisans evacuated civilians, recruits, and livestock, received shipments of soviet arms and ammo, and coordinated with Red Army reconnaissance and sabotage groups.

In Addition to territorial defense, the brigade conducted extensive sabotage operations against German infrastructure, disrupting the Vitebsk-Polotsk railway and capturing German motorboats on the Dvina River.

=== German counter-operations and losses ===
Between late 1942 and early 1943, the brigade was the target of major Nazi Anti-Partisan Operations, including operations "Monkey Cage", "Winter Forest", and "Ball Lightning".

Operation "Ball Lightning" (February 1943) was particularly devastating. Tasked with clearing Gorodok, Surazh, and Mezha, the Germans deployed 36,000 troops supported by aircraft and armor. Despite being surrounded, the partisans engaged in fierce hand-to-hand combat to break German lines. The brigade suffered significant casualties; during a single month of these operations in 1943, the brigade lost 669 partisans through deaths, injuries, and disappearances.

=== Tragedy of Batka Minai ===
The Brigade's commander, Minay Shmyryov, suffered a personal loss. In an attempt to force his surrender, Nazi forces took his four children, aged 3 to 14, hostage by the Gestapo in the fall of 1941 and executed them in February 1942. Despite this, Shmyrev continued his command.

== Legacy ==
The 1st Belarusian Partisan Brigade was officially merged with the Red Army on October 26th, 1943. For his heroism, Minai Shmyryov was awarded the title of Hero of the Soviet Union in 1944.

=== Commemorations ===
- "Vitebsk Regional Museum of the Hero of the Soviet Union M. F. Shmyrev"
- "The Ballad of the Four Hostages" a poem by Arkady Kuleshov, which became a staple of Belarusian education, memorializing Shmyryov's children.
