= Usvyatsky District =

Usvyatsky District Усвятский район (Russian)
- District
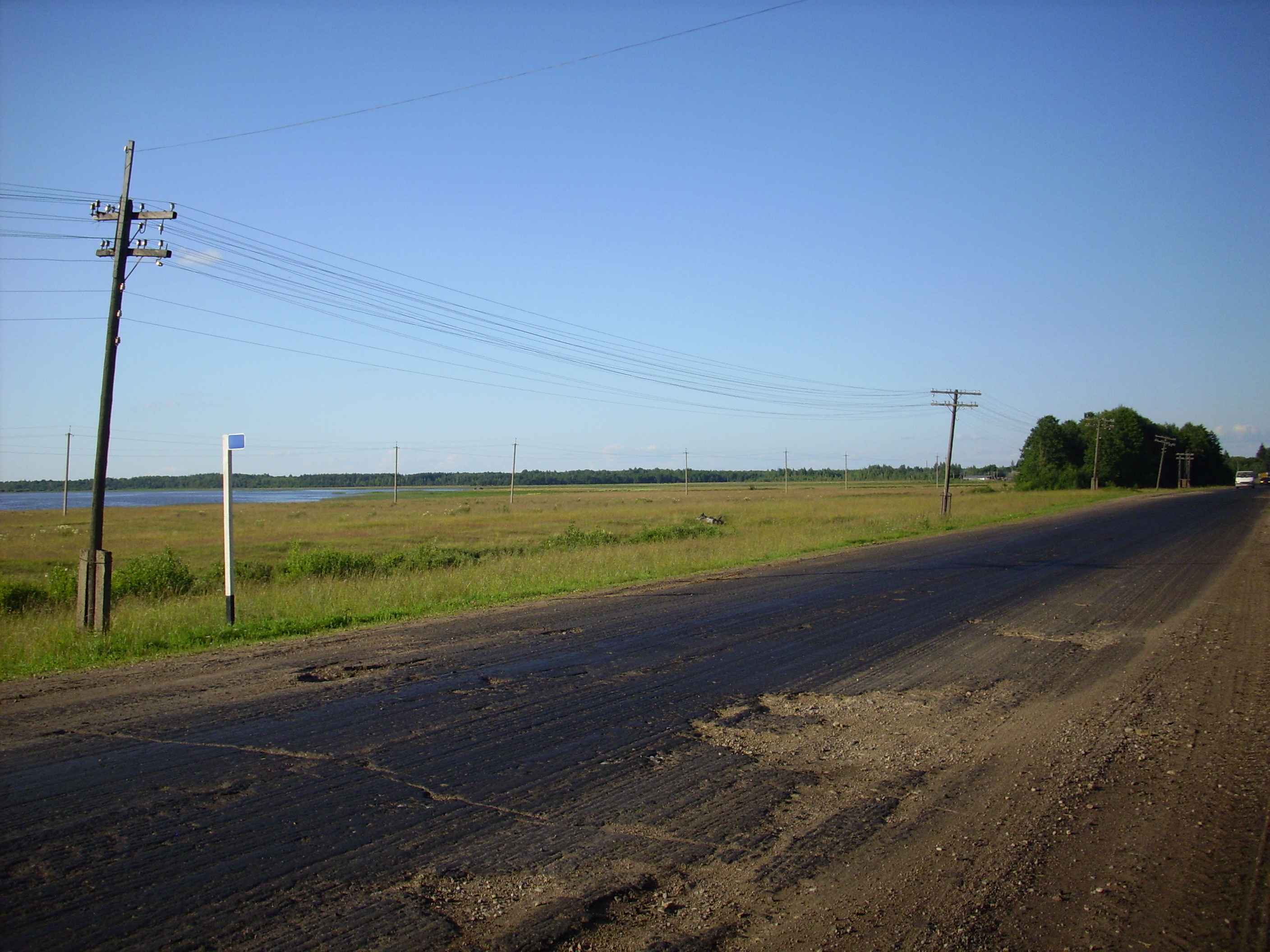
- Near Usvyaty, Usvyatsky District

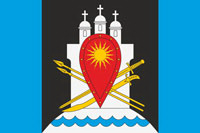
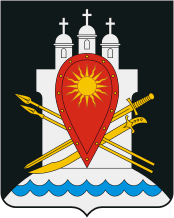
- Flag Coat of arms
- Location of Usvyatsky District in Pskov Oblast
- Coordinates: 55°44′55″N 30°45′20″E
- Country: Russia
- Federal subject: Pskov Oblast
- Established: 1927
- Administrative center: Usvyaty

Area
  - Total: 1,100 km^{2} (420 sq mi)

Population (2010 Census)
  - Total: 5,598
  - Density: 5.1/km^{2} (13/sq mi)
  - Urban: 52.9%
  - Rural: 47.1%

Administrative structure
  - Inhabited localities: 1 urban-type settlements, 107 rural localities

Municipal structure
  - Municipally incorporated as: Usvyatsky Municipal District
  - Municipal divisions: 1 urban settlements, 3 rural settlements
- Time zone: UTC+3 (MSK)
- OKTMO ID: 58658000
- Website: http://usvjaty.reg60.ru/

Usvyatsky District (Russian: Усвя́тский райо́н) is an administrative and municipal district (raion), one of the twenty-four in Pskov Oblast, Russia. It is located in the south of the oblast and borders with Velikoluksky District in the north, Kunyinsky District in the east, Velizhsky District of Smolensk Oblast in the southeast, Vitebsk and Haradok Districts of Belarus in the southwest, and Nevelsky District in the west. The area of the district is 1,100 square kilometers (420 sq mi). Its administrative center is the urban locality (a work settlement) of Usvyaty. Population: 5,598 (2010 census); 6,360 (2002 Census); 7,905 (1989 Soviet census). The population of Usvyaty accounts for 52.9% of the district's total population.

== Geography ==
The area of the district is divided between the drainage basins of the Lovat River (which belongs to the Neva River basin) and the Western Dvina River. The Lovat crosses the western part of the district from south to north, flowing from Belarus to Velikoluksky District. The biggest tributary of the Lovat in the limits of the district is the Kunya River (right), which flows to the east and crosses into Kunyinsky District. The central and the southeastern parts of the district belong to the basin of the Usvyacha River, a left tributary of the Western Dvina. The Usvyacha flows to the south, crossing into Belarus. The biggest lakes in the district are Lake Uzmen and Lake Usvyaty, both in the basin of the Usvyacha. The settlement of Usvyaty is located between these two lakes.

== History ==
The Lovat River was a part of the trade route from the Varangians to the Greeks, one of the oldest trading routes passing through Rus'. This branch of the route followed the Lovat upstream and then the Usvyacha and the Western Dvina. The area was populated since the Middle Ages, and Usvyaty (Vsvyach) was first mentioned in chronicles under 1021. The area was changing hands multiple times between Russia and Poland, eventually went to Poland and stayed there until the First Partition of Poland in 1772, when it was included into newly established Pskov Governorate, a giant administrative unit comprising what is currently Pskov Oblast and a considerable part of Belarus. After 1773, the area was split between Nevelsky and Velizhsky Uyezds of Pskov Governorate. In 1777, it was transferred to Polotsk Viceroyalty. In 1796, the viceroyalty was abolished and the area was transferred to Belarus Governorate; since 1802 to Vitebsk Governorate. Usvyaty was a center of Usvyatskaya Volost of Velizhsky Uyezd. After 1919, Vitebsk Governorate was a part of Russian Soviet Federative Socialist Republic. In 1924, Vitebsk Governorate was abolished, and Nevelsky and Velizhsky Uyezds were transferred to Pskov Governorate.

On August 1, 1927, the uyezds were abolished, and Usvyatsky District was established, with the administrative center in the selo of Usvyaty. It included parts of former Nevelsky and Velizhsky Uyezds. Pskov Governorate was abolished as well, and the district became a part of Velikiye Luki Okrug of Leningrad Oblast. On June 17, 1929, Usvyatsky District was transferred to Western Oblast. On July 23, 1930, the okrugs were also abolished and the districts were directly subordinated to the oblast. On September 27, 1937, Western Oblast was abolished, and the district was transferred to Smolensk Oblast. Between 1941 and 1944, Usvyatsky District was occupied by German troops. On August 22, 1944, the district was transferred to newly established Velikiye Luki Oblast. On October 2, 1957, Velikiye Luki Oblast was abolished, and Usvyatsky District was transferred to Pskov Oblast. On October 3, 1959 the district was abolished and merged into Nevelsky District. On December 30, 1966 it was re-established. On October 15, 1985 Usvyaty was granted urban-type settlement status.

On August 1, 1927, Usmynsky District with the administrative center in the selo of Usmyn was created on the territories which previously belonged to Nevelsky and Toropetsky Uyezds. It was a part of Velikiye Luki Okrug of Leningrad Oblast. On June 17, 1929, the district was transferred to Western Oblast, and on September 20, 1930, Usmynsky District was abolished and split between Velizhsky and Usvyatsky Districts. On March 10, 1945, it was re-established as Prikhabsky District, with the administrative center in the selo of Prikhaby, a part of Velikiye Luki Oblast, from the areas belonging to Usvyatsky and Kunyinsky Districts. In March 1949 the administrative center of the district was moved to Usmyn, and the district renamed Usmynsky. On October 2, 1957, the district was transferred to Pskov Oblast. On October 3, 1959, Usmynsky District was abolished and merged into Kunyinsky District.

On August 1, 1927, Porechyevsky District with the administrative center in the selo of Porechye was created as well on the territories which previously belonged to Nevelsky Uyezd. It was a part of Velikiye Luki Okrug of Leningrad Oblast. On June 17, 1929, the district was transferred to Western Oblast, and on September 20, 1930, Porechyevsky District was abolished and split between Velikoluksky, Nevelsky, and Usvyatsky Districts. On March 10, 1945, it was re-established as Porechensky District, a part of Velikiye Luki Oblast, from the areas belonging to Velikoluksky and Nevelsky Districts. On October 2, 1957, the district was transferred to Pskov Oblast. On March 23, 1959, Porechensky District was abolished and merged into Velikoluksky District.

== Economy ==
=== Industry ===
There are enterprises of timber and food industry, located in Usvyaty.

=== Agriculture ===
The main specializations of agriculture in the district are meat and milk production.

=== Transportation ===
The highway connecting Nevel with Smolensk via Usvyaty and Velizh crosses the district from northwest to southeast. The whole stretch between Nevel and Velizh has been a toll road since 2002. A road connects Usvyaty with Kunya. There are also local roads.

== Culture and recreation ==
The district contains twenty objects classified as cultural and historical heritage of local significance. They are archaeological sites as well as monuments to soldiers fallen in World War II.
