= Velizhsky =

Velizhsky (masculine), Velizhskaya (feminine), or Velizhskoye (neuter) may refer to:

- Velizhsky District, a district of Smolensk Oblast, Russia
- Velizhskoye Urban Settlement, an administrative division and a municipal formation which the town of Velizh and seventeen rural localities in Velizhsky District of Smolensk Oblast, Russia are incorporated as
