= Usvyaty =

Usvyaty (Russian: Усвяты) is the name of several inhabited localities in Pskov Oblast, Russia.

Urban localities

- Usvyaty, Usvyatsky District, Pskov Oblast, a work settlement in Usvyatsky District

Rural localities

- Usvyaty, Velikoluksky District, Pskov Oblast, a village in Velikoluksky District
