= Surazh =

Surazh can mean

- Surazh, Russia, a town in Bryansk Oblast, Russia
- Surazh, Belarus, alternatively spelled Suraž, an urban-type settlement in Vitebsk Oblast, Belarus
- Suraż, a town in Poland
