= Velizhsky District =

Velizhsky District Велижский район (Russian)
- District
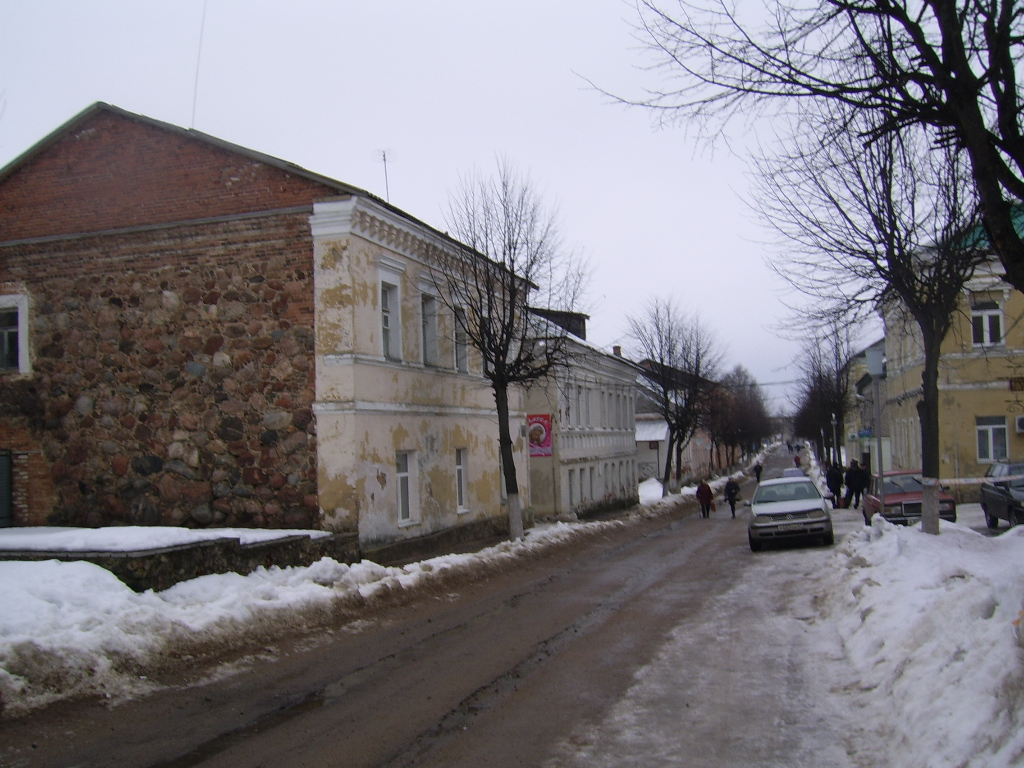
- Velizh in winter, Velizhsky District

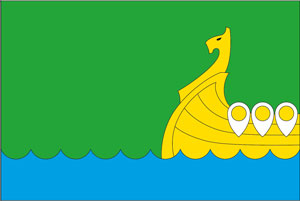
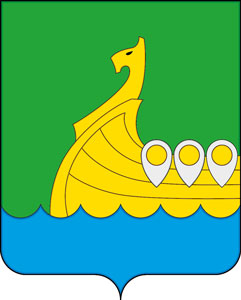
- Flag Coat of arms
- Location of Velizhsky District in Smolensk Oblast
- Coordinates: 55°36′N 31°12′E
- Country: Russia
- Federal subject: Smolensk Oblast
- Established: 1927
- Administrative center: Velizh

Area
  - Total: 1,473.19 km^{2} (568.80 sq mi)

Population (2010 Census)
  - Total: 12,248
  - Density: 8.3139/km^{2} (21.533/sq mi)
  - Urban: 62.2%
  - Rural: 37.8%

Administrative structure
  - Administrative divisions: 1 Urban settlements, 8 Rural settlements
  - Inhabited localities: 1 cities/towns, 157 rural localities

Municipal structure
  - Municipally incorporated as: Velizhsky Municipal District
  - Municipal divisions: 1 urban settlements, 8 rural settlements
- Time zone: UTC+3 (MSK)
- OKTMO ID: 66603000
- Website: http://velizh.admin-smolensk.ru/

Velizhsky District (Russian: Ве́лижский райо́н) is an administrative and municipal district (raion), one of the twenty-five in Smolensk Oblast, Russia. It is located in the northwest of the oblast and borders with Vitebsk District, Vitebsk Region of Belarus in the west, Usvyatsky and Kunyinsky Districts of Pskov Oblast in the northwest, Zapadnodvinsky and Zharkovsky Districts of Tver Oblast in the northeast, Demidovsky District in the east, and with Rudnyansky District in the south. The area of the district is 1,473.19 square kilometers (568.80 sq mi). Its administrative center is the town of Velizh. Population: 12,248 (2010 Census); 14,329 (2002 census); 17,239 (1989 Soviet census). The population of Velizh accounts for 62.2% of the district's total population.

== Geography ==
The whole area of the district belongs to the drainage basin of the Western Dvina. The Western Dvina itself crosses the district from northwest to southeast, and its major left tributary, the Mezha, makes the border with Tver Oblast. There are many lakes within the district. 49.5% of district's territory is covered by forests.

== History ==
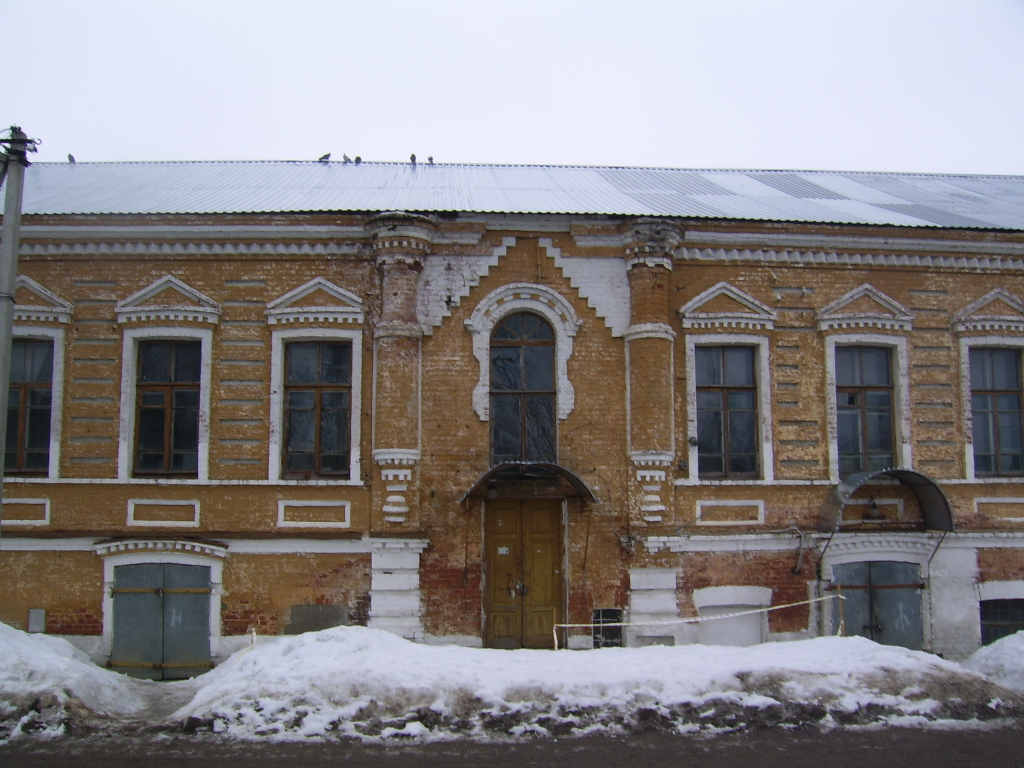
A historical building in the center of Velizh

The area was settled in the prehistory, and, as the Western Dvina always has been an important waterway, there are multiple archaeological sites along its course. In the 12th century, it belonged to the Principality of Toropets. In the 14th century, together with the principality, it was annexed by the Grand Duchy of Lithuania, where it became a part of the Principality of Vitebsk. In 1502, all lands east of the Mezha and the Western Dvina were transferred to the Grand Duchy of Moscow, and in 1536 Tsar Ivan the Terrible ordered that a fortress for border protection, later the town of Velizh, be built. In 1580, during the Livonian War, Polish army took Velizh, and after the war, the area was transferred to Poland, where it was included into Vitebsk Voivodeship. Until 1772, the area was transferred between Russia and Poland subject to short-term peace agreements.

After the First Partition of Poland in 1772 the area was included into newly established Pskov Governorate, a giant administrative unit comprising what is currently Pskov Oblast and a considerable part of Belarus. After 1773, the area belonged to Velizhsky Uyezd of Pskov Governorate. In 1777, it was transferred to Polotsk Viceroyalty. In 1796, the viceroyalty was abolished and the area was transferred to Byelorussia Governorate; since 1802 to Vitebsk Governorate. Between July and October 1812, Velizh was occupied by the army of Napoleon advancing to Moscow. In 1924, Vitebsk Governorate was abolished, and Velizhsky Uyezds was transferred to Pskov Governorate.

On 1 August 1927, Velizhsky Uyezd was abolished, and Velizhsky District with the center in Velizh was established. It belonged to Velikiye Luki Okrug of Leningrad Oblast. On June 17, 1929, Velizhsky District was transferred to Western Oblast. On 23 July 1930, the okrugs were also abolished and the districts were directly subordinated to the oblast. On 17 September 1937, Western Oblast was abolished, and the district was transferred to Smolensk Oblast. During WWII, between July 1941 and September 1943, Velizhsky District was occupied by German troops. On 1 February 1963, during the abortive Khrushchyov administrative reform, Velizhsky District was merged into Demidovsky District, but on 12 January 1965 it was re-established.

== Economy ==
=== Industry ===
In 2013, 35% of the industrial output of the district was made by enterprises of textile industry, 17% by timber industry, and 10% by food industry. Most of these enterprises are located in Velizh.

=== Agriculture ===
The main agricultural specialization of the district is cattle breeding with meat and milk production.

=== Transportation ===
Paved roads connect Velizh with Smolensk, Nevel via Usvyaty, and Vitebsk. There are also local roads with bus traffic originating from Velizh.

There are no railways in the district. The closest railway station is in Rudnya, on the railway connecting Smolensk with Vitebsk.

== Culture and recreation ==
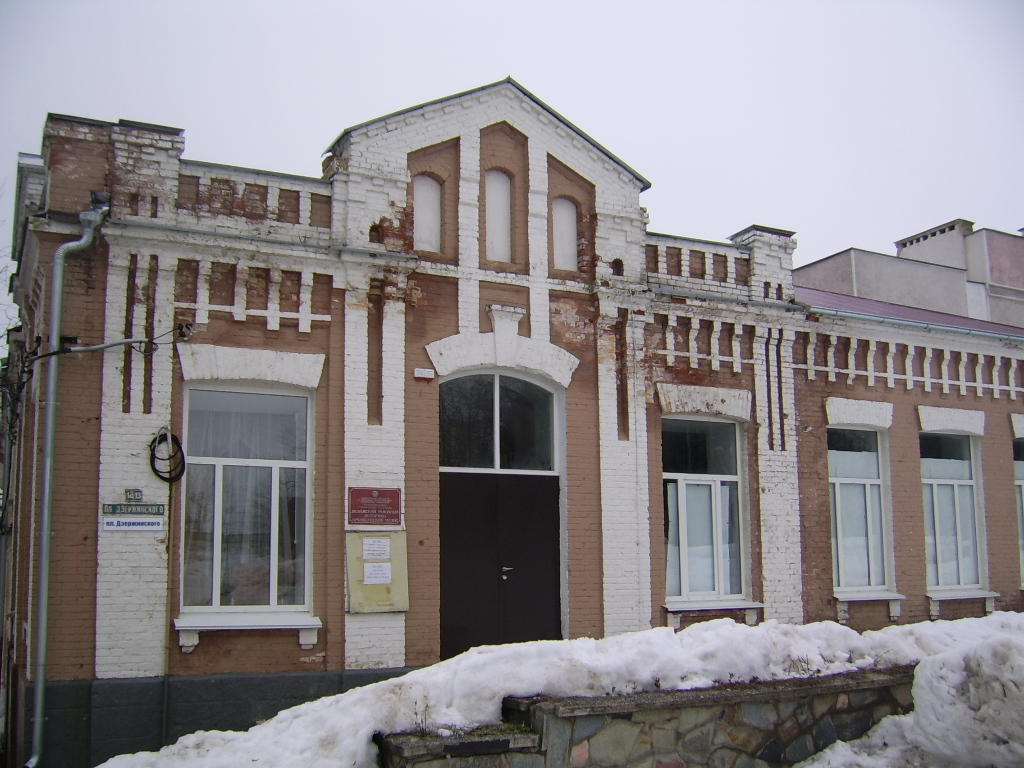
Velizh Museum

There is a local museum in Velizh.
