= Jurka Vićbič =

Belarusian writer and émigré leader

- Юрка Віцьбіч
- Born: Sierafim Alaksandravič Ščarbakoŭ; June 15, 1905; Vieliž, Vitebsk Governorate, Russian Empire
- Died: January 6, 1975 (aged 69); South River, New Jersey, USA
- Resting place: South River Belarusian Cemetery, New Jersey, USA
- Occupations: Writer, publicist
- Writing career
- Language: Belarusian
- Literary movement: Uzvyšša

Jurka Vićbič (Note: Belarusian: Юрка Віцьбіч, romanized: Yurka Vits’bich, sometimes given as Yurka Vitsbich, romanized: Jurka Vićbič) (15 June 1905 – 6 January 1975, also known as Jury Stukalicz) (Note: Belarusian: Юры Стукаліч, romanized: Yury Stukalich, polonized: Jury Stukalicz) was a pen name of Sierafim Alaksandravich Ščarbakoŭ, (Note: Belarusian: Серафім Аляксандравіч Шчарбакоў, romanized: Syerafim Alyaksandravich Shcharbakow, polonized: Ščarbakoŭ) a Belarusian writer, publicist and a prominent member of the Belarusian diaspora.

== Life in Belarus ==
Vićbič was born in Vieliž, Viciebsk Province of the Russian Empire into the family of an Orthodox Priest. He graduated from a teaching college and started writing in the late 1920s. In 1929 his first work appeared in Uzvyšša (Belarusian: Узвышша, High Ground), a literary journal which was published between 1927 and 1931 in Soviet Belarus, followed by his books The Death of Irma Lajming (Belarusian: Сьмерць Ірмы Лаймінг) in 1932 and The Formula of Bones’ Resistance (Belarusian: Формула супраціўленьня касьцей) in 1937.

However, his work L'Shana Haba'ah B'Yerushalayim (Hebrew: לשנה הבאה בירושלים, lit. "Next year in Jerusalem", Belarusian: Лшоно Габоо Бійрушалайм) was not permitted for publication in Soviet Belarus. Vićbič was accused of “polluting the Belarusian language with archaic words and Belarusian literature with fictional characters hostile to the Soviet reality” and ostracised for his “style which clearly differentiate[d] the writer from the cannons of the contemporary Soviet writing”.

== Life in exile ==
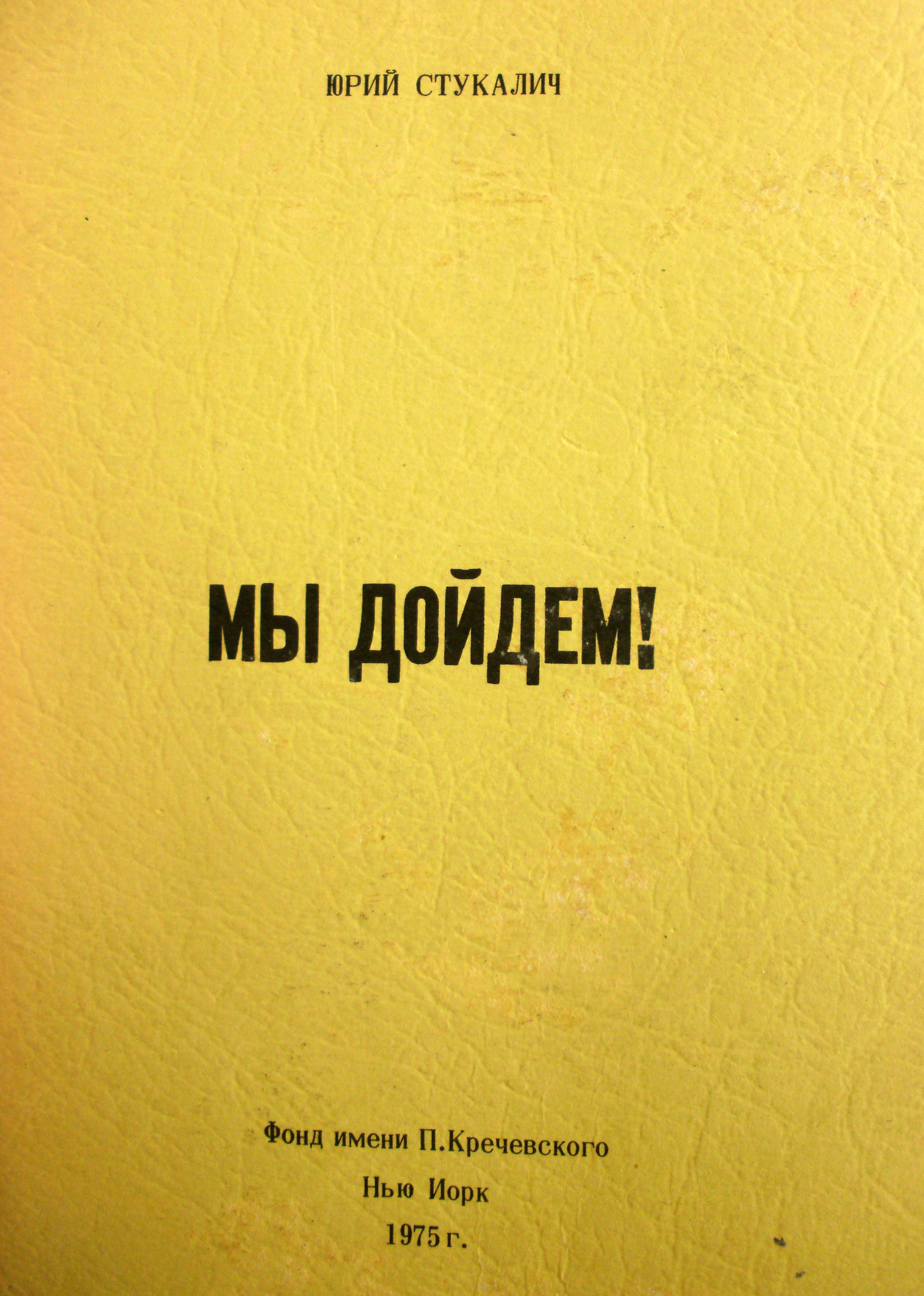
We will get there! (Belarusian: Мы дойдзем!), 1975

After World War II, Vićbič lived in Western Europe and then in the US becoming a prominent member of the Belarusian diaspora. He founded a literary society Šypšyna (Belarusian: Шыпшына (Wild Rose)) and launched a journal with the same name. Later, he was instrumental in the publication of another journal Źviniać zvany Śviatoj Safii (Belarusian: Зьвіняць званы Сьвятой Сафіі (The Bells of St Sophia Ringing)).

In 1956 he published a book Nioman flows From Under a Holy Mountain (Belarusian: Плыве з-пад Сьвятое гары Нёман). Further books We will get there! (Belarusian: Мы дойдзем!) and Anti-Bolshevik Uprisings in Belarus (Belarusian: Антыбальшавіцкія паўстаньні ў Беларусі) were published posthumously.

Vićbič died on 6 January 1975 and was buried in the South River Belarusian Cemetery in New Jersey, USA.

== Notable works ==
- The Archbishop and the Serf (Belarusian: Арцыбіскуп і смерд), 1931 – a historic novel about Jasafat Kuncevyč
- The Death of Irma Lajming (Belarusian: Сьмерць Ірмы Лаймінг), 1932 – a tragic story of a young noble woman
- L'Shana Haba'ah B'Yerushalayim (Hebrew: לשנה הבאה בירושלים, lit. "Next year in Jerusalem", Belarusian: Лшоно Габоо Бійрушалайм) – a story about a Jewish community in the early 20th century Belarus
- The Formula of Bones’ Resistance (Belarusian: Формула супраціўленьня касьцей), 1937 – another book of prose fiction
- Neman flows From Under a Holy Mountain (Belarusian: Плыве з-пад Сьвятое гары Нёман), 1956 – “a unique explanation of the origin of more than 500 Belarusian geographical names”
- We will get there! (Belarusian: Мы дойдзем!), 1975 – a compilation of Vićbič ’s articles
- Anti-Bolshevik Uprisings in Belarus (Belarusian: Антыбальшавіцкія паўстаньні ў Беларусі), 1996 – a book about anti-Soviet resistance in Belarus in the 1920s
