= 2nd Belarusian Partisan Brigade =

Partisan Brigade in World War 2

- Flag of the Soviet Union
- Active: 1942-1943 (first composition); 1943-1944 (second composition)
- Country: Soviet Union
- Allegiance: Red Army
- Type: Partisan
- Role: Sabotage; Guerilla Warfare
- Size: 274 (First Composition); 394 (Second Composition)
- Engagements: Eastern Front (World War II); Rail War

The 2nd Belarusian Partisan Brigade was a Soviet Partisan formation that operated in the Nazi-occupied territories of the Byelorussian SSR and other areas during World War 2. they primarily operated in the Mekhovsky, Gorodonsky, and Surazhsky Districts of the Vitebsk region. The Brigade was established twice; the first formation was disbanded in early 1943. Before being reconstituted, operations were to continue until the arrival of the Red Army.

== Organization ==
The Brigade's origins trace back to July 1941, when a "Fighter Battalion" (Destruction Battalion) led by I.T Gustev was established in the Mekhovsky District. By July 18th, this unit was reorganized into the Mekhovsky Partisan Detachment under the command of K.F Volkov.

Following a winter of skirmishes and internal restructuring, the detachment was expanded to a brigade on May 7th, 1942, into the 2nd Belarusian Partisan Brigade. By January 1943, the brigade had grown to include 9 detachments. These were given honorary names of Soviet military and revolutionary figures, such as Suvorov, Chapayev , and Stalin.

== Initial Combat Operations ==
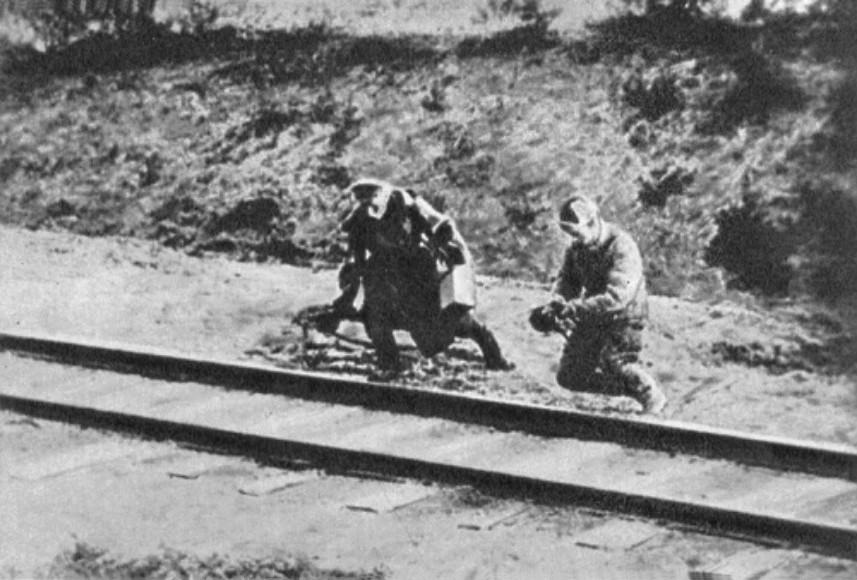
The brigade made important contributions to the Rail War by carrying out extensive sabotage operations.

During 1942, the brigade focused on the "Rail War", conducting extensive sabotage operations on the Vitebsk-Nevel and Polotsk-Nevel railway lines. They also routed German garrisons at the Bychikha and Yezerishche stations and in various villages in the Gorodok District. In early 1943, German Command launched a series of anti-partisan sweeps. Following a Period of intense combat near the villages of Tsari and Budnista, the brigade, which had numbered 597 partisans, was forced to retreat across the frontlines into Soviet-held territory on March 4th, 1943, leading to the brigade's temporary dissolution.

== Reconstitution and Combat Operations during 1944 ==
In late March 1943, the brigade was reformed behind enemy lines. By June 1944, the brigade became a primary target during Operation Cormoran, a massive German security operation aimed at clearing the rear areas of Army Group Centre. Archival reports from this period described a desperate struggle:

- In Early June, German Forces (estimated at 9 divisions with tanks and artillery) began concentrating in the Lepel-Chashniki area. By June 10, the Germans had fortified the Lepel-Borisov Highway with Trenches and pillboxes every 100 meters, trapping the partisans.
- The Brigade was forced to retreat into the marshy terrains of Lake Palik. Under constant artillery fire and aerial bombardment, the partisans were pushed back into the forests, where they faced severe supply issues.
- Records indicate that during the height of the encirclement, the encircled partisans were suffering from extreme famine and were surviving on grass and animal hides.

=== Breakthrough and Liberation ===
On the night of June 25th, 1944, the German blockade was finally lifted as the Red Army's Operation Bagration reached the area. Small groups of partisans successfully navigated their way through German minefields and patrols to link up with Soviet forces on June 27th, 1944. Following the link-up, the brigade assisted the Red Army in clearing the remaining German Stragglers from the forests.

== Disbandment ==
The Brigade was officially merged into the Red Army on June 27th, 1944, consisting of 394 Partisans.

== Commemorations ==
The Brigade's Contributions are honored by several monuments in the Vitebsk region:

- In Berezovka, a memorial steel was erected in 1972.
- In Bychivka Station: A memorial plaque was dedicated in 1965.
- In Dubrova: a Monument was erected in 1979 commemorating the 1943 raid on the local German Garrison.
