= Lake Usvyaty =

Lake in Russia

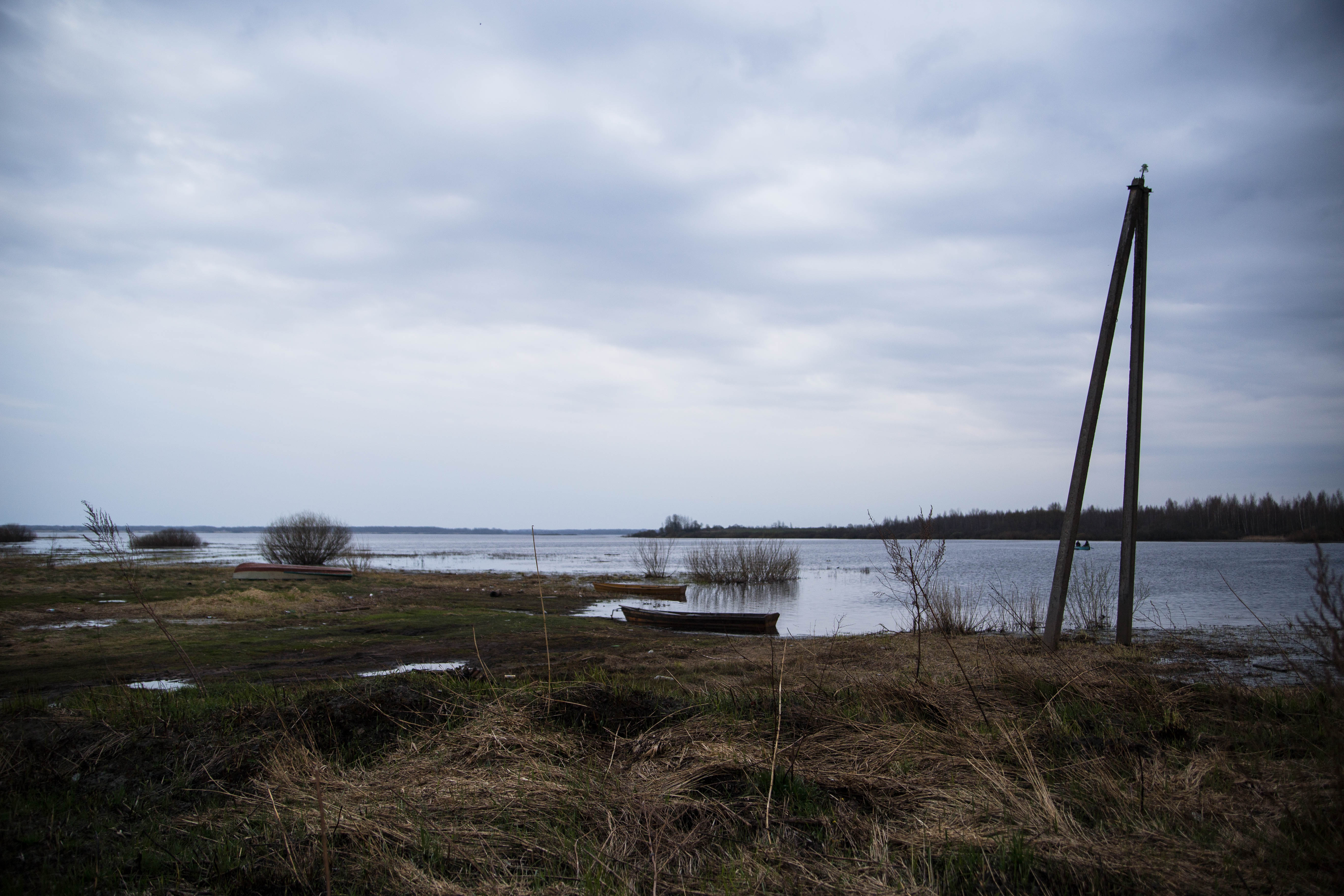
- View of Lake Usvyaty

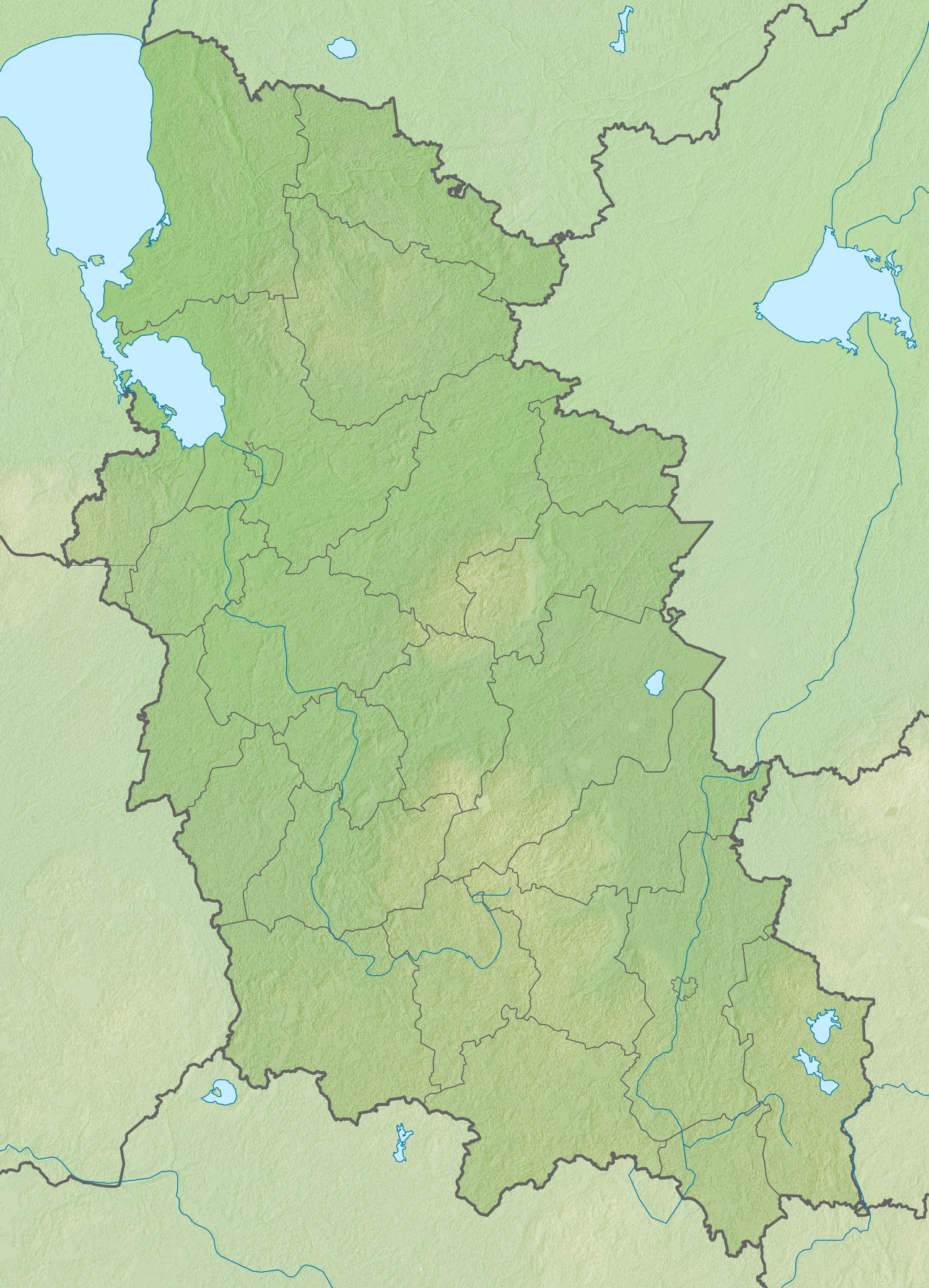
- Location of Lake Usvyaty in Pskov Oblast
- Location: Pskov Oblast, Russia
- Coordinates: 55.752872°N 30.699711°E
- Primary inflows: Usvyacha River
- Primary outflows: Usvyacha River
- Basin countries: Russia
- Surface area: 6.99 km^{2} (2.70 sq mi)
- Average depth: 1.4 m (4 ft 7 in)
- Max. depth: 3.6 m (12 ft)
- Water volume: 1.9 km^{3} (0.46 cu mi)
- Surface elevation: 144 m (472 ft)
- Settlements: Usvyaty, Bondarvo, Dvoreets, Molitvino

Lake Usvyaty is a lake in the Usvyatsky volost of the Ussvyaty Rayon of the Pskov Oblast, Russia. It has a water surface of 6.99 km² (699.0 ha) and a total surface, including islands of 7.03 km² (703.0 ha). The maximum depth of the lake is 3.6 m and the average depth is 1.4 m.

On the shore of the lake there is the settlement Usvyaty and the villages of Bondarvo, Dvoreets, Molitvino.

The Ussycha River crosses the lake, flowing from north to south-west. The river is part of the Daugava (Western Dvina) river basin .

Type of lake is bream-roach with a glue and pike perch. Mass species of fish: bream, pike perch, pike, roach, perch, gusher, rudd, ruff, glue, sink, burbot, crucian, tench, ide, loach, pinworm.

For the lake is characteristic: in the littoral - silt, peat, sand, silted sand, in the center - silt, local frosts, in the coastal zone - meadows, swamps, wetlands

== Literature ==
- зеро Усвяты, Усвятский район, Псковская обл.
