= Surazhsky =

Surazhsky (masculine), Surazhskaya (feminine), or Surazhskoye (neuter) may refer to:

- Surazhsky District, a district of Bryansk Oblast, Russia
- Surazhsky Urban Administrative Okrug, an administrative division which the town of Surazh in Surazhsky District of Bryansk Oblast, Russia is incorporated as
- Surazhskoye Urban Settlement, a municipal formation which Surazhsky Urban Administrative Okrug in Surazhsky District of Bryansk Oblast, Russia is incorporated as
- Surazhsky (rural locality), a rural locality (a village) in the Republic of Bashkortostan, Russia
