= Surazh, Vitebsk region =

Urban-type settlement in Vitebsk Region, Belarus

Surazh Сураж
- Urban-type settlement
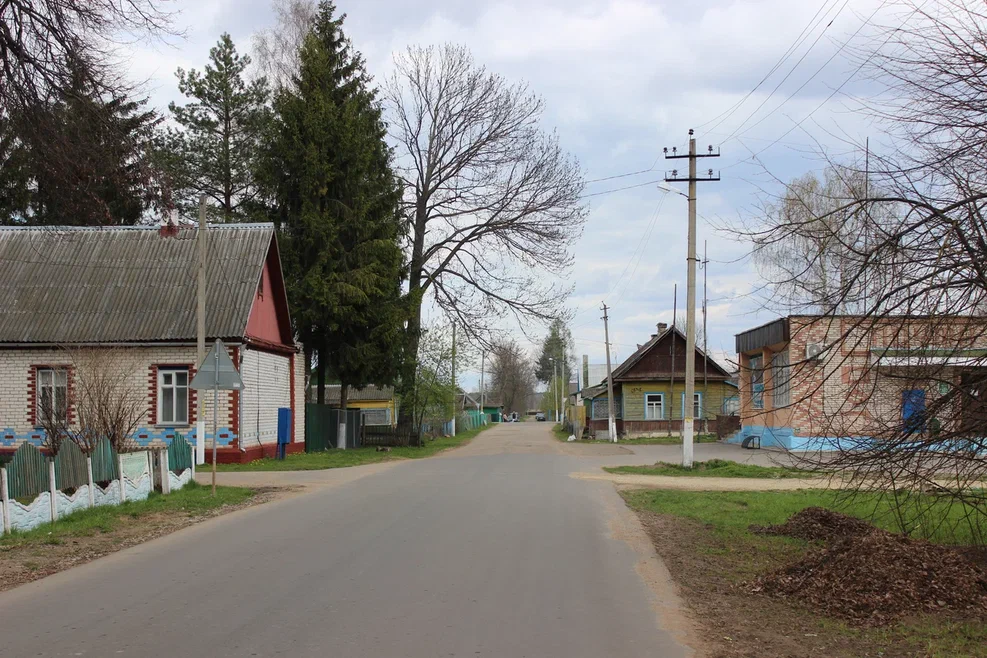

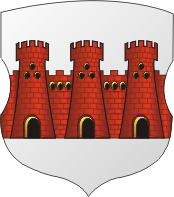
- Coat of arms

- Location within Belarus
- Coordinates: 55°24′20″N 30°43′22″E
- Country: Belarus
- Region: Vitebsk Region
- District: Vitebsk District
- Established: 1564

Population (2025)
  - Total: 647
- Time zone: UTC+3 (MSK)

Surazh (Belarusian: Сураж, romanized: Suraž; Russian: Сураж) is an urban-type settlement in Vitebsk District, Vitebsk Region, Belarus. It is located approximately 45 kilometres (28 mi) northeast from the city of Vitebsk. It is situated at the crossing of the Daugava (or Western Dvina) and Kasplya rivers. As of 2025, it has a population of 647.

== History ==
Historical population
Year	Pop.	±%
1870	1,738	—
1897	2,731	+57.1%
2023	681	−75.1%
2024	672	−1.3%
2025	647	−3.7%

The town was founded in 1564 by voivode of Witebsk Stefan Zbaraski on the order of King Sigismund II Augustus as a defensive stronghold against possible Muscovite attacks. In 1570 he granted various privileges, including two annual fairs to attract settlers. In 1580, Polish forces under hetman Jan Zamoyski stayed in the town before recapturing Velizh. In 1616, the town was burned down by Russian troops.

Following the First Partition of Poland (1772), it was annexed by Russia, and from 1802 it was administratively located in the Vitebsk Governorate. It hosted the main quarters of Napoleonic Viceroy of Italy Eugène de Beauharnais during the French invasion of Russia of 1812. In 1870 there were 70 craftsmen in the town, and in 1891 there were 67 industrial plants in the town, which employed 1,279 people. Two annual fairs were held in the town in the late 19th century. In 1897, the ethnic make-up, by mother tongue, was 51.5% Belarusian, 45.7% Jewish, and 2.1% Russian.

=== Jewish community ===
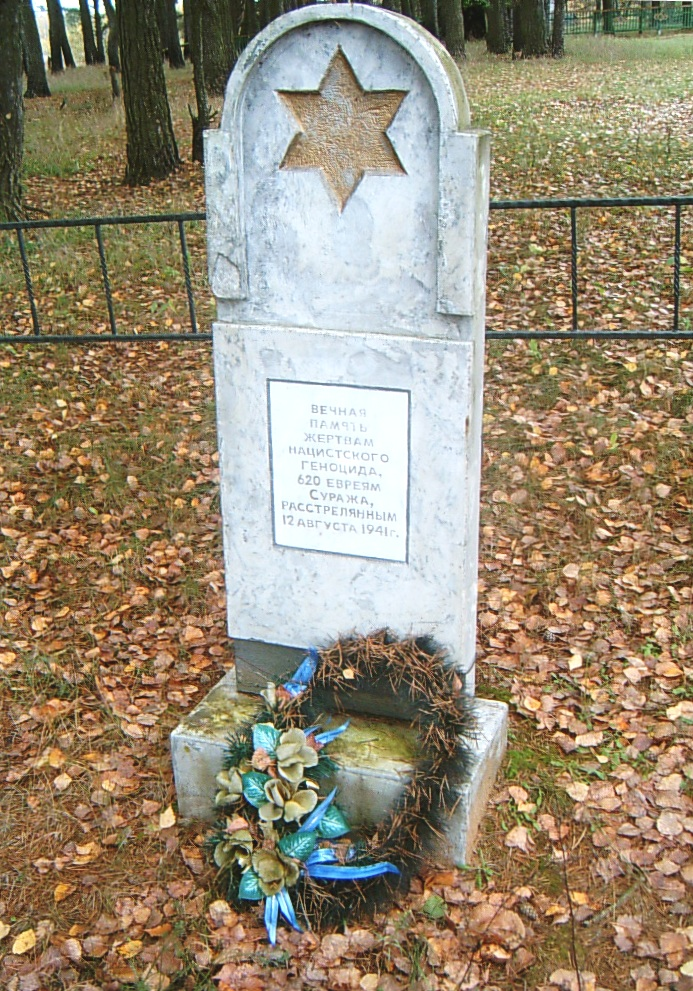
Memorial to Holocaust victims

Surazh was a shtetl, with a Jewish population of 1,246 in 1900.

In 1917, there were 6 synagogues. All of them were wooden, except one made out of stone. There were 461 Jews in Surazh in 1939 (15.4 % of the total population).

The village was under German occupation from 1941 to 1943. Einsatzkommando 9 carried out the murder of the Jews of Surazh in conjunction with an antipartisan operation. On August 12, 1941, between 600 and 750 Jews were gathered by the Germans on the location of the former printing office in Surazh. Then, they were taken and shot behind the linen factory, 2 km away from the village, in pits of the ravine, known as Loubtchyno. The bodies of the victims were exhumed and reburied after the war in the Jewish cemetery.
