= Usvyaty, Usvyatsky District, Pskov Oblast =

Urban locality in Russia

Usvyaty Усвяты
- Work settlement
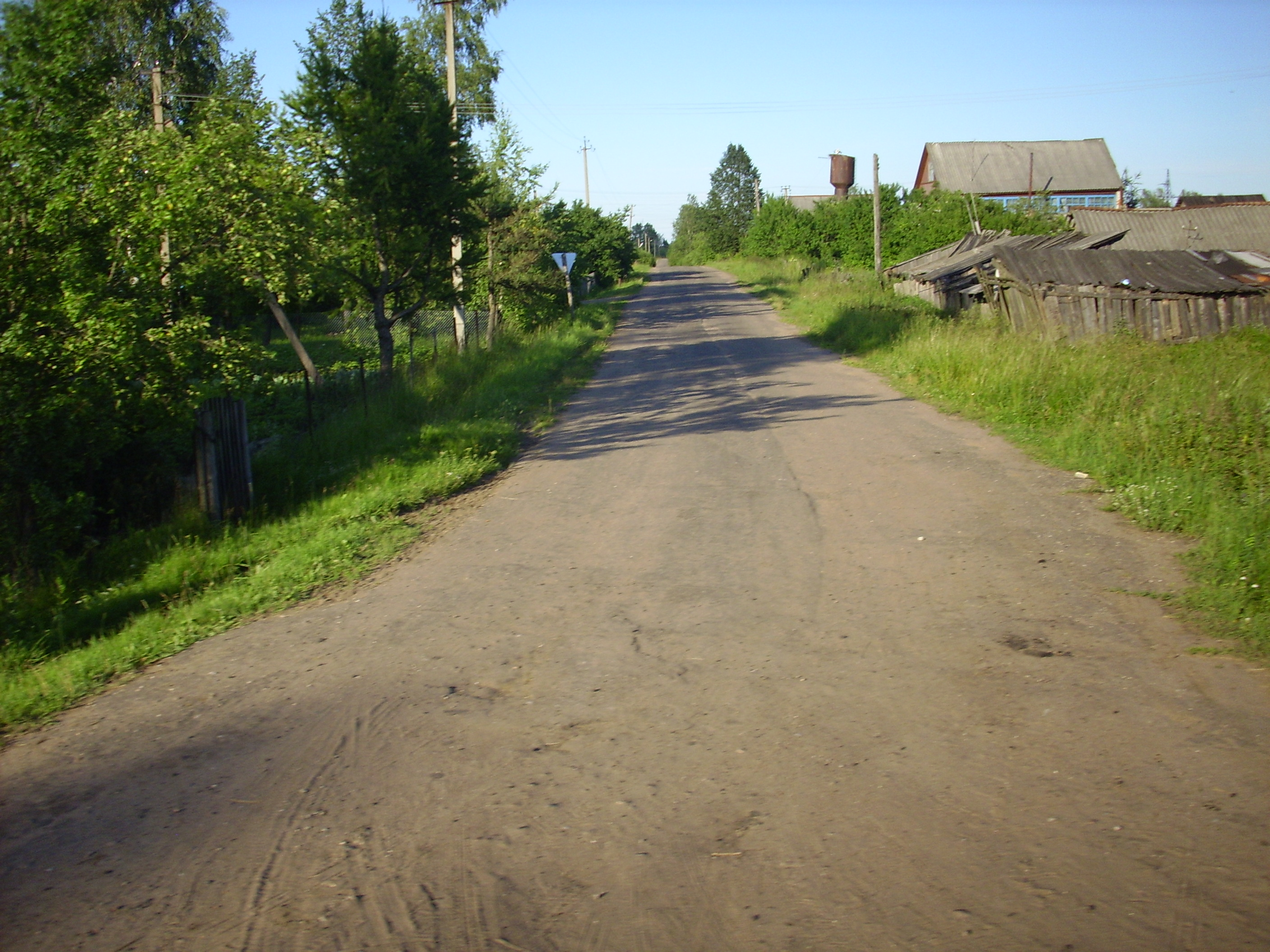
- Interactive map of Usvyaty
- Location of Usvyaty Usvyaty (Pskov Oblast)
- Coordinates: 55°44′55″N 30°45′20″E
- Country: Russia
- Federal subject: Pskov Oblast
- Administrative district: Usvyatsky District
- Urban-type settlement status since: 1985

Population (2010 Census)
  - Total: 2,961
  - Estimate (2021): 2,671 (−9.8%)

Administrative status
  - Capital of: Usvyatsky District

Municipal status
  - Municipal district: Usvyatsky Municipal District
  - Urban settlement: Usvyaty
  - Capital of: Usvyatsky Municipal District, Usvyaty Urban Settlement
- Time zone: UTC+3 (MSK)
- Postal code: 182570
- OKTMO ID: 58658151051

Usvyaty (Russian: Усвяты) is an urban locality (a work settlement) and the administrative center of Usvyatsky District of Pskov Oblast, Russia. It is located on the right bank of the Usvyacha River, between Lake Uzmen and Lake Usvyaty, two biggest lakes in the area. Municipally, it is incorporated as Usvyaty Urban Settlement, the only urban settlement in the district. Population: 2,961 (2010 census); 3,148 (2002 census); 3,638 (1989 Soviet census).

== History ==
The Lovat River was a part of the trade route from the Varangians to the Greeks, one of the oldest trading routes passing through Rus'. This branch of the route followed the Lovat upstream and then the Usvyacha and the Western Dvina. The area was populated since the Middle Ages, and Usvyaty (Vsvyach) was first mentioned in chronicles under 1021. In the Late Middle Ages, it was an important fortress of the Grand Duchy of Lithuania, since 1386 in the Polish–Lithuanian union. In 1566, it was captured by Russia, but was recaptured by the Polish–Lithuanian Commonwealth in 1580. In 1653, it was captured by Russia again, but was restored to the Poland-Lithuania by the Truce of Andrusovo in 1667.

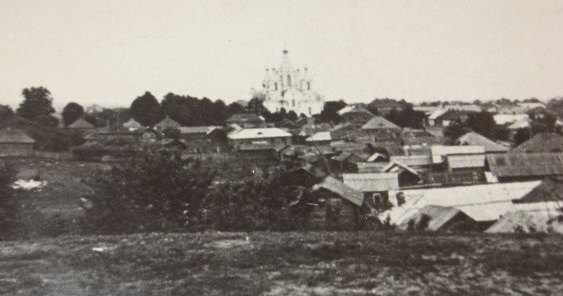
Early 20th-century view of the town

During the First Partition of Poland in 1772, it was annexed by Russia, and included into newly established Pskov Governorate, a giant administrative unit comprising what is currently Pskov Oblast and a considerable part of Belarus. After 1773, the area was split between Nevelsky and Velizhsky Uyezds of Pskov Governorate. In 1777, it was transferred to Polotsk Viceroyalty. In 1796, the viceroyalty was abolished and the area was transferred to Belarus Governorate; since 1802 to Vitebsk Governorate. Usvyaty was a center of Usvyatskaya Volost of Velizhsky Uyezd. In the late 19th century, three annual fairs and two weekly markets were held in the town. After 1919, Vitebsk Governorate was a part of Russian Soviet Federative Socialist Republic. In 1924, Vitebsk Governorate was abolished, and Nevelsky and Velizhsky Uyezds were transferred to Pskov Governorate.

On August 1, 1927, the uyezds were abolished, and Usvyatsky District was established, with the administrative center in Usvyaty. It included parts of former Nevelsky and Velizhsky Uyezds. Pskov Governorate was abolished as well, and the district became a part of Velikiye Luki Okrug of Leningrad Oblast. On June 17, 1929, Usvyatsky District was transferred to Western Oblast. On July 23, 1930, the okrugs were also abolished and the districts were directly subordinated to the oblast. On September 27, 1937, Western Oblast was abolished, and the district was transferred to Smolensk Oblast. Between 1941 and 1944, Usvyaty was occupied by German troops. On August 22, 1944, the district was transferred to newly established Velikiye Luki Oblast. On October 2, 1957, Velikiye Luki Oblast was abolished, and Usvyatsky District was transferred to Pskov Oblast. On October 3, 1959 the district was abolished and merged into Nevelsky District. On December 30, 1966 it was re-established. On October 15, 1985 Usvyaty was granted urban-type settlement status.

== Economy ==
=== Industry ===
In Usvyaty, there are enterprises of timber and food industry. The latter include meat processing plants of Velikoluksky Myasokombinat.

=== Transportation ===
The highway connecting Nevel with Smolensk via Usvyaty and Velizh bypasses Usvyaty. The whole stretch between Nevel and Velizh has been a toll road since 2002. A road connects Usvyaty with Kunya. There are also local roads.

== Culture and recreation ==
Usvyaty contains two objects classified as cultural and historical heritage of local significance. They are an archaeological site and a tomb of soldiers fallen in World War II.

== Notable people ==
- Algirdas (1296–1377) — ruler of medieval Lithuania
- Matvey Obryutin — Russian voivode
- Platon Zubov (1767–1822) — Russian prince, the last of Catherine the Great's favourites
- Egor Meller-Zakomelskiy (1767–1830) - Lieutenant general of Russian army
- Pyotr Schmyakov (1872-?) - Russian politician, member of Russian State Duma
- Konstantin Kosarev (1898–1978) - officer of Soviet army, recipient of Order of Lenin
- Ierokhim Epstein (1899–1981) - Russian engineer, winner of Lenin Prize
- Fyodor Demchenko (1919–1943) - officer of Soviet army, Hero of the Soviet Union
- Viliy Karpenko (1924–1995) - officer of Soviet army, Hero of the Soviet Union
- Nikolay Kovalyov (1929–2007) - Russian worker, Hero of Socialist Labour
- Nina Kurilyonok (1934) - Russian worker, Hero of Socialist Labour
