= Velizh =

Town in Smolensk Oblast, Russia

Velizh Велиж
- Town
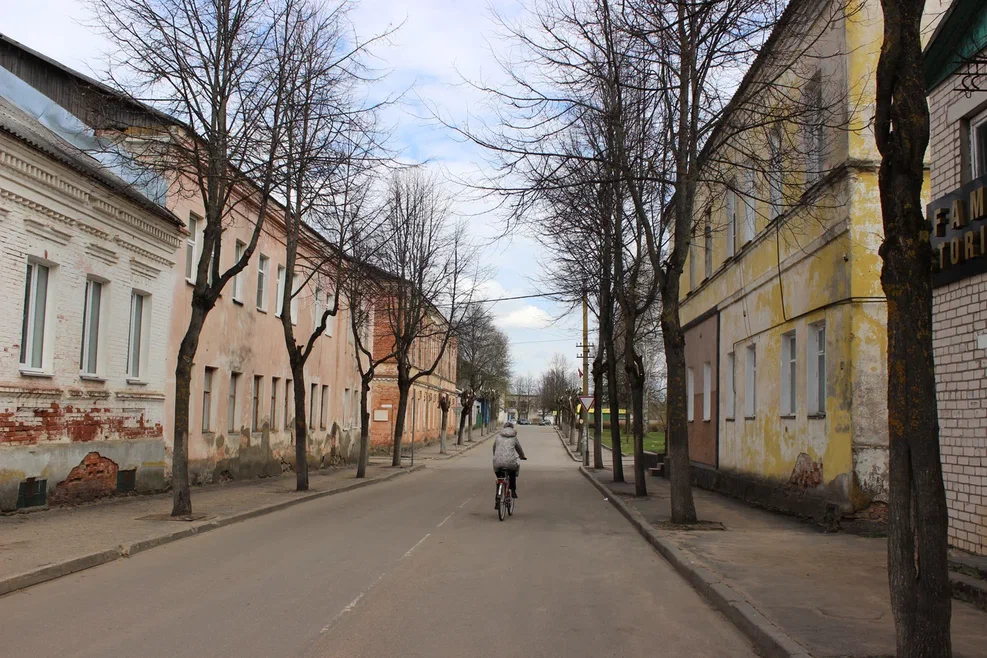
- In central Velizh

- Coat of arms
- Interactive map of Velizh
- Location of Velizh Velizh (Smolensk Oblast)
- Coordinates: 55°36′N 31°11′E
- Country: Russia
- Federal subject: Smolensk Oblast
- Administrative district: Velizhsky District
- Urban settlementSelsoviet: Velizhskoye
- Founded: 1536 (Julian)

Area
  - Total: 226.62 km^{2} (87.50 sq mi)
- Elevation: 160 m (520 ft)

Population (2010 Census)
  - Total: 7,620
  - Estimate (2024): 6,005 (−21.2%)
  - Density: 33.6/km^{2} (87.1/sq mi)

Administrative status
  - Capital of: Velizhsky District, Velizhskoye Urban Settlement

Municipal status
  - Municipal district: Velizhsky Municipal District
  - Urban settlement: Velizhskoye Urban Settlement
  - Capital of: Velizhsky Municipal District, Velizhskoye Urban Settlement
- Time zone: UTC+3 (MSK)
- Postal codes: 216290, 216291
- OKTMO ID: 66603101001

Velizh (Russian: Ве́лиж) is a town and the administrative center of Velizhsky District in Smolensk Oblast, Russia, located on the bank of the Western Dvina, 134 kilometers (83 mi) from Smolensk, the administrative center of the oblast. Population: 7,620 (2010 census); 8,343 (2002 census); 9,146 (1989 Soviet census).

== History ==
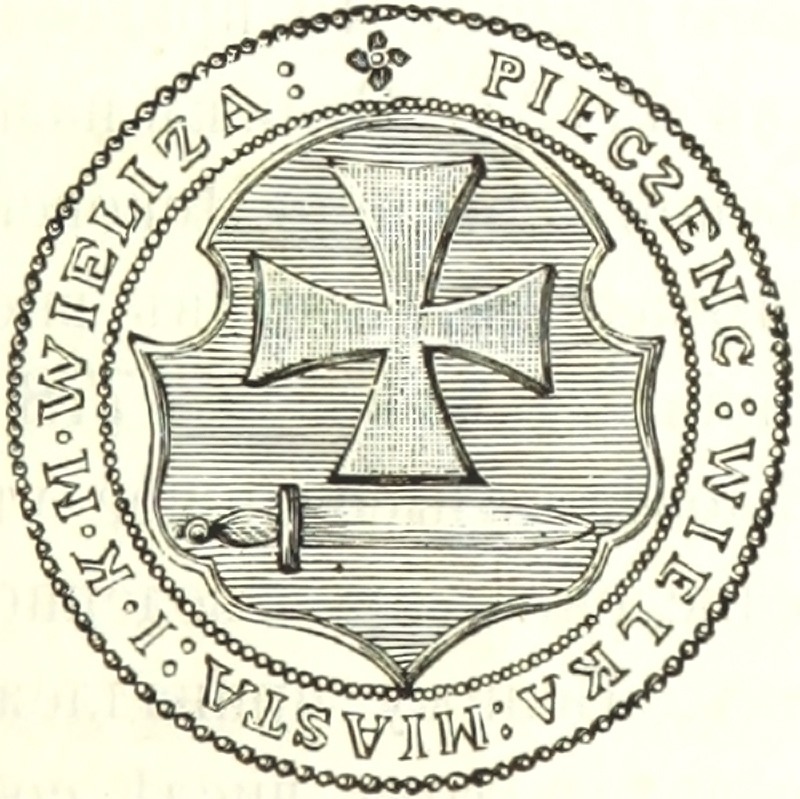
Seal of the Royal Town of Wieliż from the times of the Polish–Lithuanian Commonwealth

In the late 14th century, it used to be a border fortress of the Grand Duchy of Lithuania. Muscovy recaptured it in 1536. Lithuania recaptured it in 1562, then Muscovy again in 1563, then Polish forces led by Jan Zamoyski captured it in 1580, confirmed by the 1582 Truce of Yam-Zapolsky. In 1585, King Stephen Báthory of Poland established the coat of arms and granted privileges for the townspeople. In 1654 it was occupied by Russia, but in 1667 it was restored to the Polish–Lithuanian Commonwealth.

After the First Partition of Poland in 1772 the town was annexed by Russia and included into newly established Pskov Governorate, a giant administrative unit comprising what is currently Pskov Oblast and a considerable part of Belarus. After 1773, the area belonged to Velizhsky Uyezd of Pskov Governorate. In 1777, it was transferred to Polotsk Viceroyalty. In 1796, the viceroyalty was abolished and the area was transferred to Byelorussia Governorate; since 1802 to Vitebsk Governorate. Between July and October 1812, Velizh was occupied by the army of Napoleon advancing to Moscow. In 1924, Vitebsk Governorate was abolished, and Velizhsky Uyezds was transferred to Pskov Governorate.

In April 1823, Velizh was the site of an infamous blood libel incident, in which local Jews were wrongly accused of the murder of Christian boy who was found dead in a field. Based on the testimony of a drunk prostitute, over forty Jews were arrested and in 1826 the synagogues were closed. Some of the accused were not released until 1835.

In 1860 there were 649 craftsmen in the town, and in 1891 there were 67 industrial plants in the town, which employed 1,279 people. Two annual fairs were held in the town in the late 19th century. In 1897, the ethnic make-up, by mother tongue, was 49.1% Jewish, 47.6% Belarusian, 2.3% Russian, and 0.4% Polish.

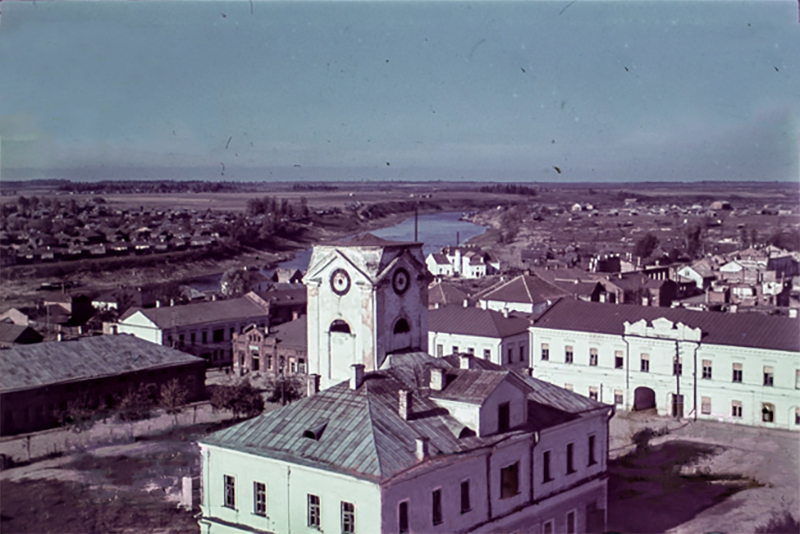
Market square in 1941

On 1 August 1927, governorates were abolished, and Velizhsky District with the center in Velizh was established. It belonged to Velikiye Luki Okrug of Leningrad Oblast. On June 17, 1929, Velizhsky District was transferred to Western Oblast. On 23 July 1930, the okrugs were also abolished and the districts were directly subordinated to the oblast. On 17 September 1937, Western Oblast was abolished, and the district was transferred to Smolensk Oblast. During World War II, between July 1941 and September 1943, Velizhsky District was occupied by German troops.

Much of the town was destroyed during World War II. During the war, Velizh was occupied by the German Army from July 14, 1941 to September 20, 1943. In September 1942, German occupation forces murdered all but 17 of the town's 1,440 Jewish residents.

On 1 February 1963, during the abortive Khrushchyov administrative reform, Velizhsky District was merged into Demidovsky District, but on 12 January 1965 it was re-established.

Historical population
Year	Pop.	±%
1885	16,372	—
1897	12,193	−25.5%
1989	9,146	−25.0%
2002	8,343	−8.8%
2010	7,620	−8.7%

== Administrative and municipal status ==
Within the framework of administrative divisions, Velizh serves as the administrative center of Velizhsky District. As an administrative division, it is, together with seventeen rural localities, incorporated within Velizhsky District as Velizhskoye Urban Settlement. As a municipal division, this administrative unit also has urban settlement status and is a part of Velizhsky Municipal District.

== Economy ==
=== Industry ===
In 2013, 35% of the industrial output of Velizhsky district was made by enterprises of textile industry, 17% by timber industry, and 10% by food industry. Most of these enterprises are located in Velizh.

=== Transportation ===
Paved roads connect Velizh with Smolensk, Nevel via Usvyaty, and Vitebsk. There are also local roads with bus traffic originating from Velizh.

The closest railway station is in Rudnya, on the railway connecting Smolensk with Vitebsk.

== Culture and recreation ==
There is a local museum in Velizh.

The houses of Nikolay Przhevalsky and Alexander Rodzyanko in the proximity to Velizh are open to the public as museums.

== Notable people ==
- Vladimir Gorev, Belarusian Soviet military
- Max Penson, Russian photographer and photojournalist
- Baruch Poupko, Jewish American multi-lingual scholar and Orthodox Rabbi
- Jurka Vićbič, Belarusian writer, publicist and a prominent member of the Belarusian diaspora
