= Vitebsk district =

District of Vitebsk region, Belarus

Coordinates: 55°11′N 30°10′E

Vitebsk district Віцебскі раён (Belarusian) Витебский район (Russian)
- District
- Flag Coat of arms

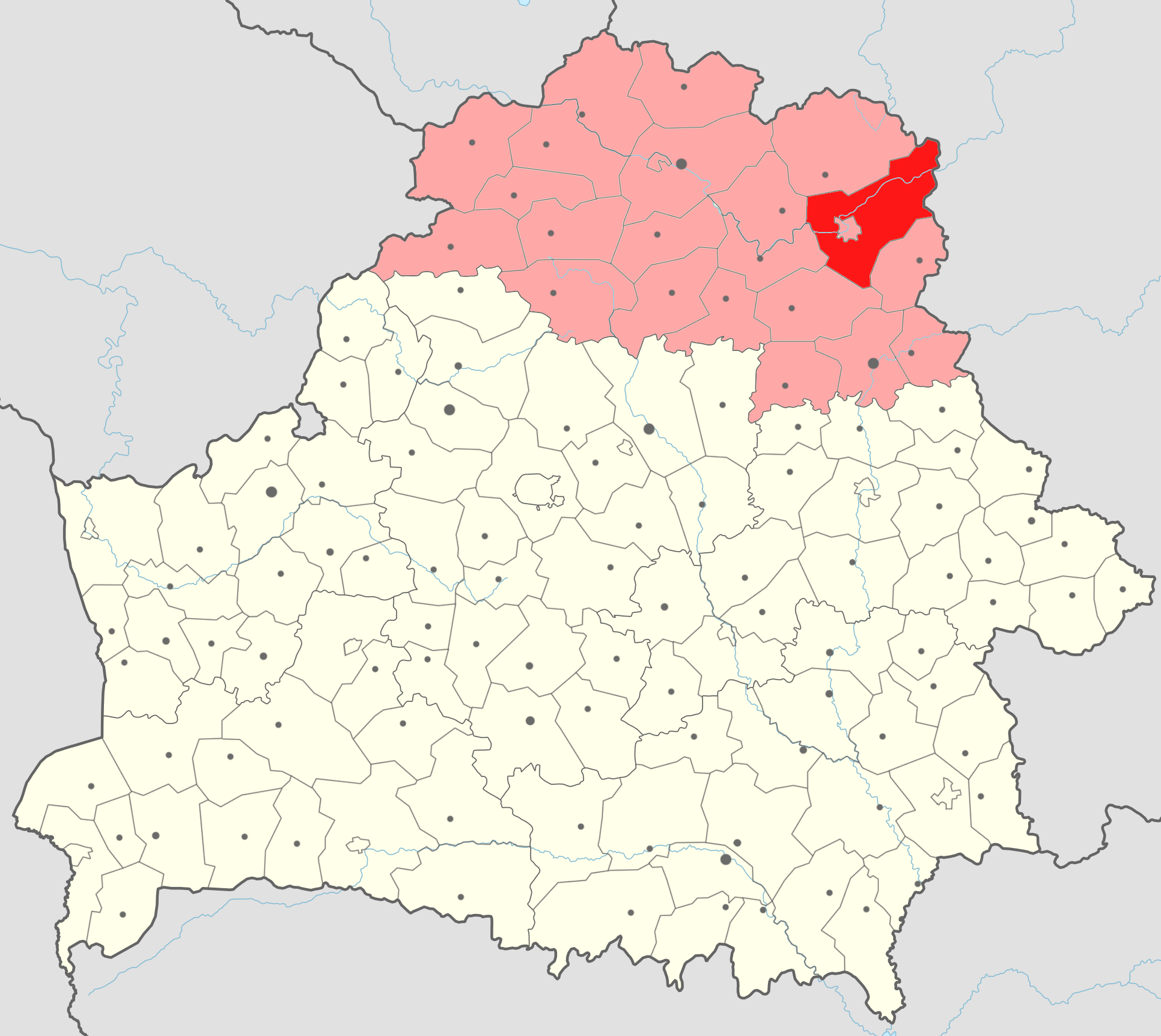
- Location of Vitebsk District within Vitebsk Region
- Country: Belarus
- Region: Vitebsk region
- Administrative center: Vitebsk
- Municipalities: Total 44 + Vitebsk

Area
  - Total: 2,737 km^{2} (1,057 sq mi)

Population (2023)
  - Total: 34,478
  - Density: 12.60/km^{2} (32.63/sq mi)
- Time zone: UTC+3 (MSK)
- Governor: Gennady Sabynich
- Website: Official website

Vitebsk district or Viciebsk district (Belarusian: Віцебскі раён, romanized: Viciebski rajon; Russian: Витебский район, romanized: Vitebsky rayon) is a district (raion) of Vitebsk region in northern Belarus. The administrative center of the district is the city of Vitebsk, which is administratively separated from the district. The most populated town of the district itself is Ruba.

== Geography ==
Situated in the eastern side of the district and crossed by the Vitba River; Vitebsk District borders, from north to south, the districts of Haradok, Shumilina, Beshankovichy, Syanno and Liozna. In the eastern side it borders with the Russian oblasts, from south to north, of Smolensk and Pskov.

== Administrative divisions ==
The district is divided into 8 rural councils (selsoviets) and 45 municipalities (including Vitebsk).

=== Municipalities ===
- Vidzy

== Notable residents ==
- Alexander Rypinski (1809, Kukaviačyna estate – 1886), Belarusian and Polish poet, translator and folklorist, participant in the November Uprising
