= List of uezds of the Russian Empire =

This is a list of uezds of the Russian Empire and its immediate successor states.

== A ==
Uezd	Region	Period	Capital	Now part of	Notes
Achinsky	Tobolsk Viceroyalty	1782–1797	Achinsk	Russia	(Note: Disbanded 1797, recreated 1822 as Achinsky Okrug. Uyezd from 1898)
Achinsky	Yeniseysk Governorate	1822–1925	Achinsk	Russia	(Note: Disbanded 1797, recreated 1822 as Achinsky Okrug. Uyezd from 1898)
Akhalkalaki	Tiflis Governorate	1874–1918	Akhalkalaki	Georgia	
Akhalkalaki	DRG	1918–1921	Akhalkalaki	Georgia	
Akhalkalaki	Georgian SSR	1921–1930	Akhalkalaki	Georgia	
Akhaltsikhe	Georgia-Imeretia Governorate	1840–1846	Akhaltsikhe	Georgia	
Akhaltsikhe	Kutais Governorate	1846–1867	Akhaltsikhe	Georgia	
Akhaltsikhe	Tiflis Governorate	1867–1918	Akhaltsikhe	Georgia	
Akhaltsikhe	DRG	1918–1921	Akhaltsikhe	Georgia	
Akhaltsikhe	Georgian SSR	1921–1930	Akhaltsikhe	Georgia	
Akhtyrka	Kharkov Viceroyalty	1780–1796	Akhtyrka (Okhtyrka)	Ukraine	
Akhtyrka	Sloboda Ukraine Governorate	1796–1835	Akhtyrka (Okhtyrka)	Ukraine	
Akhtyrka	Kharkov Governorate	1835–1923	Akhtyrka (Okhtyrka)	Ukraine	
Akkerman	Bessarabian Oblast	1818–1873	Akkerman (Bilhorod-Dnistrovskyi)	Ukraine, Moldova	
Akkerman	Bessarabia Governorate	1873–1918	Akkerman (Bilhorod-Dnistrovskyi)	Ukraine, Moldova	
Akmechet	Novorossiya Governorate	1796–1802	Akmechet (Simferopol)	Crimea (Russia/Ukraine)	
Akmolinsk	Oblast of Siberia Kirgiz	1854–1868	Akmolinsk (Nur-Sultan)	Kazakhstan	(Note: Akmolinsk Okrug before 1898)
Akmolinsk	Akmolinsk Oblast	1868–1920	Akmolinsk (Nur-Sultan)	Kazakhstan	(Note: Akmolinsk Okrug before 1898)
Akmolinsk	Omsk Governorate	1920–1925	Akmolinsk (Nur-Sultan)	Kazakhstan	(Note: Akmolinsk Okrug before 1898)
Akmolinsk	Akmolinsk Governorate, Kirghiz ASSR	1925–1928	Akmolinsk (Nur-Sultan)	Kazakhstan	(Note: Akmolinsk Okrug before 1898)
Aktyubinsk	Turgay Oblast	1868–1920	Aktyubinsk (Aktobe)	Kazakhstan, Russia	(Note: Ilets Uyezd before 1891 (with seat in Iletskaya Zashchita). Disbanded 1921, recreated 1922)
Aktyubinsk	Orenburg-Turgay Governorate, Kirghiz ASSR	1920–1921	Aktyubinsk (Aktobe)	Kazakhstan, Russia	(Note: Ilets Uyezd before 1891 (with seat in Iletskaya Zashchita). Disbanded 1921, recreated 1922)
Aktyubinsk	Aktyubinsk Governorate, Kirghiz ASSR	1922–1928	Aktyubinsk (Aktobe)	Kazakhstan, Russia	(Note: Ilets Uyezd before 1891 (with seat in Iletskaya Zashchita). Disbanded 1921, recreated 1922)
Aksha	Transbaikal Oblast	1872–1922	Aksha	Russia	(Note: Aksha Okrug before 1901)
Aksha	Transbaikal Governorate	1922–1926	Aksha	Russia	(Note: Aksha Okrug before 1901)
Alatyrsky	Kazan Governorate	1708–1719	Alatyr	Russia	
Alatyrsky	Nizhny Novgorod Governorate	1719–1780	Alatyr	Russia	
Alatyrsky	Simbirsk Viceroyalty	1780–1796	Alatyr	Russia	
Alatyrsky	Simbirsk Governorate	1796–1925	Alatyr	Russia	
Alatyrsky	Chuvash ASSR	1925–1927	Alatyr	Russia	
Aleksandriya	Yekaterinoslav Viceroyalty	1784–1796	Aleksandriya (Oleksandriia)	Ukraine	(Note: Disbanded 1796, recreated 1806)
Aleksandriya	Kherson Governorate	1806–1920	Aleksandriya (Oleksandriia)	Ukraine	(Note: Disbanded 1796, recreated 1806)
Aleksandriya	Kremenchuk Governorate	1920–1923	Aleksandriya (Oleksandriia)	Ukraine	(Note: Disbanded 1796, recreated 1806)
Alexandropol	Georgia-Imeretia Governorate	1840–1846	Alexandropol (Gyumri)	Armenia	(Note: Renamed Leninakan Uyezd 1924)
Alexandropol	Tiflis Governorate	1846–1849	Alexandropol (Gyumri)	Armenia	(Note: Renamed Leninakan Uyezd 1924)
Alexandropol	Erivan Governorate	1849–1918	Alexandropol (Gyumri)	Armenia	(Note: Renamed Leninakan Uyezd 1924)
Alexandropol	DRA	1918–1920	Alexandropol (Gyumri)	Armenia	(Note: Renamed Leninakan Uyezd 1924)
Alexandropol	Armenian SSR	1920–1924	Alexandropol (Gyumri)	Armenia	(Note: Renamed Leninakan Uyezd 1924)
Alexandropol	Armenian SSR	1924–1929	Leninakan (Gyumri)	Armenia	(Note: Renamed Leninakan Uyezd 1924)
Alexandrov	Vladimir Viceroyalty	1778–1796	Alexandrov	Russia	
Alexandrov	Vladimir Governorate	1796–1929	Alexandrov	Russia	
Alexandrovsk	Yekaterinoslav Governorate	1805–1920	Alexandrovsk (Zaporizhia)	Ukraine	
Alexandrovsk	Zaporizhzhia Governorate, UkrSSR	1920–1922	Alexandrovsk (Zaporizhia)	Ukraine	
Alexandrovsk	Yekaterinoslav Governorate, UkrSSR	1922–1923	Alexandrovsk (Zaporizhia)	Ukraine	
Alexandrovsk	Caucasus Viceroyalty	1785–1796	Alexandrovsk (Alexandrovskoye)	Russia	(Note: Disbanded 1822, recreated 1873)
Alexandrovsk	Caucasus Governorate	1796–1822	Alexandrovsk (Alexandrovskoye)	Russia	(Note: Disbanded 1822, recreated 1873)
Alexandrovsk	Stavropol Governorate	1873–1924	Alexandrovsk (Alexandrovskoye)	Russia	(Note: Disbanded 1822, recreated 1873)
Aleksin	Moscow Governorate	1727–1796	Aleksin	Russia	
Aleksin	Tula Governorate	1796–1925	Aleksin	Russia	
Anadyar Uyezd	Primorskaya Oblast	1856-1909	Novo-Mariinsk	Russia	
Anadyar Uyezd	Kamchatka Oblast	1909-1922	Novo-Mariinsk	Russia	
Anadyar Uyezd	Kamchatka Governorate	1922-1926	Novo-Mariinsk	Russia	
Ananyev	Kherson Governorate	1834–1920	Ananyev (Ananiv)	Ukraine	
Ananyev	Odessa Governorate, UkrSSR	1920–1921	Ananyev (Ananiv)	Ukraine	
Andizhan	Fergana Oblast	1876–1924	Andijan	Uzbekistan, Kyrgyzstan	
Ardatov	Simbirsk Governorate	1780–1928	Ardatov	Russia	
Ardatov	Nizhny Novgorod Governorate	1779–1923	Ardatov	Russia	
Areshsky uezd	Elisabethpol Governorate	1873–1918	Agdash	Azerbaijan	(Note: Renamed Agdashsky Uyezd 1920)
Areshsky uezd	ADR	1918–1920	Agdash	Azerbaijan	(Note: Renamed Agdashsky Uyezd 1920)
Areshsky uezd	Azerbaijan SSR	1920–1926	Agdash	Azerbaijan	(Note: Renamed Agdashsky Uyezd 1920)
Arkhangelsky	Arkhangelsk Governorate	1708–1780	Arkhangelsk	Russia	
Arkhangelsky	Vologda Viceroyalty	1780–1784	Arkhangelsk	Russia	
Arkhangelsky	Arkhangelsk Viceroyalty	1784–1796	Arkhangelsk	Russia	
Arkhangelsky	Arkhangelsk Governorate	1796–1929	Arkhangelsk	Russia	
Arsky	Kazan Viceroyalty	1781–1796	Arsk	Russia	
Arzamassky	Kazan Governorate	1707–1713	Arzamas	Russia	
Arzamassky	Nizhny Novgorod Governorate	1713–1779	Arzamas	Russia	
Arzamassky	Nizhny Novgorod Viceroyalty	1779–1796	Arzamas	Russia	
Arzamassky	Nizhny Novgorod Governorate	1796–1929	Arzamas	Russia	
Askhabadsky	Transcaspian Oblast	1882–1921	Askhabad (Ashgabat)	Turkmenistan	(Note: Akhalteki Uyezd before 1890, Poltoratsky Uyezd from 1919)
Askhabadsky	Turkmen Oblast, Turkestan ASSR	1921–1924	Askhabad (Ashgabat)	Turkmenistan	(Note: Akhalteki Uyezd before 1890, Poltoratsky Uyezd from 1919)
Askhabadsky	Turkmen Soviet Socialist Republic	1924–1925	Askhabad (Ashgabat)	Turkmenistan	(Note: Akhalteki Uyezd before 1890, Poltoratsky Uyezd from 1919)
Astrakhansky	Astrakhan Governorate	1727–1785	Astrakhan	Russia	
Astrakhansky	Caucasus Viceroyalty	1785–1796	Astrakhan	Russia	
Astrakhansky	Astrakhan Governorate	1796–1925	Astrakhan	Russia	
Atbasarsky	Akmolinsk Oblast	1869–1918	Atbasar	Kazakhstan	(Note: Sarysuysky Okrug before 1878, Atbasarsky Okrug in 1878–1898)
Atbasarsky	Omsk Oblast	1918–1920	Atbasar	Kazakhstan	(Note: Sarysuysky Okrug before 1878, Atbasarsky Okrug in 1878–1898)
Atbasarsky	Omsk Governorate	1920–1921	Atbasar	Kazakhstan	(Note: Sarysuysky Okrug before 1878, Atbasarsky Okrug in 1878–1898)
Atbasarsky	Akmolinsk Governorate, Kirghiz ASSR	1921–1928	Atbasar	Kazakhstan	(Note: Sarysuysky Okrug before 1878, Atbasarsky Okrug in 1878–1898)
Atkarsky	Saratov Viceroyalty	1780–1796	Atkarsk	Russia	
Atkarsky	Penza Governorate	1796–1797	Atkarsk	Russia	
Atkarsky	Saratov Governorate	1797–1928	Atkarsk	Russia	
Augustów	Augustów Governorate	1837–1867	Augustów	Poland, Belarus	
Augustów	Suwałki Governorate	1867–1918	Augustów	Poland, Belarus	

== B ==
Uezd	Region	Period	Capital	Now part of	Notes
Babinovichy	Mogilev Governorate	1777-1778	Babinovichy	Belarus	
Babinovichy	Mogilev Viceroyalty	1778-1796	Babinovichy	Belarus	
Babinovichy	Belarus Governorate	1796-1802	Babinovichy	Belarus	
Babinovichy	Mogilev Governorate	1802-1840	Babinovichy	Belarus	
Bobruysky	Minsk Governorate	1793–1921	Bobruysk (Babruysk)	Belarus	
Bobruysky	Byelorussian SSR	1921–1924	Bobruysk (Babruysk)	Belarus	
Baku	Caspian Oblast	1840–1846	Baku	Azerbaijan	
Baku	Shemakha Governorate	1846–1859	Baku	Azerbaijan	
Baku	Baku Governorate	1859–1920	Baku	Azerbaijan	
Baku	Azerbaijan SSR	1920–1929	Baku	Azerbaijan	
Beletsky	Bessarabia Governorate	1818–1918	Beltsy (Bălți)	Moldova	(Note: Yassky Uyezd before 1887.)
Beletsky	Kingdom of Romania	1918–1940	Beltsy (Bălți)	Moldova	(Note: Yassky Uyezd before 1887.)
Bausky	Courland Governorate	1819–1918	Bausk (Bauska)	Latvia	
Bausky	Latvian SSR	1918–1920	Bausk (Bauska)	Latvia	
Bausky	First Latvian Republic	1920–1940	Bausk (Bauska)	Latvia	
Bausky	Latvian SSR	1940–1949	Bausk (Bauska)	Latvia	
Belebey County	Ufa Governorate		Belebey		
Belozersky	Cherepovets Governorate				
Belozersky	Novgorod Governorate				
Belsky	Belostok Oblast	1808–1843	Belsk (Bielsk Podlaski)	Poland, Belarus	
Belsky	Grodno Governorate	1843–1920	Belsk (Bielsk Podlaski)	Poland, Belarus	
Belsky	Smolensk Governorate	1708–1713	Bely	Russia	
Belsky	Riga Governorate	1713–1726	Bely	Russia	
Belsky	Smolensk Governorate	1726–1775	Bely	Russia	
Belsky	Smolensk Viceroyalty	1775–1796	Bely	Russia	
Belsky	Smolensk Governorate	1796–1929	Bely	Russia	
Bendersky	Bessarabia Governorate		Bendery (Bender)		
Bendersky	Kingdom of Romania		Bendery (Bender)		
Bendersky	Moldavian SSR		Bendery (Bender)		
Berdichev County	Kiev Governorate				
Bezhetsky	Tver Governorate		Bezhetsk		
Bogodukhovsky	Kharkov Governorate				
Bogodukhovsky	Sloboda Ukraine Governorate				
Bogodukhovsky	Kharkov Viceroyalty				
Borchaly	Tiflis Governorate	1880–1918	Shulavery (Shaumiani)	Armenia, Georgia	
Borchaly	DRG	1918–1921	Shulavery (Shaumiani)	Armenia, Georgia	
Borchaly	Georgian SSR	1921–1925	Shulavery (Shaumiani)	Armenia, Georgia	
Borchaly	Georgian SSR	1925–1929	Shaumiani	Armenia, Georgia	
Borisoglebsk uezd	Tambov Governorate		Borisoglebsk		
Borisov County	Minsk Governorate		Barysau		
Brestsky	Slonim Viceroyalty		Brest	Belarus	
Brestsky	Lithuania Governorate		Brest	Belarus	
Brestsky	Grodno Governorate		Brest	Belarus	
Bykhov	Mogilev Governorate	1777-1778	Bykhov	Belarus	(Note: Starobyhov Uezd before 1852)
Bykhov	Mogilev Viceroyalty	1778-1796	Bykhov	Belarus	(Note: Starobyhov Uezd before 1852)
Bykhov	Belarus Governorate	1796-1802	Bykhov	Belarus	(Note: Starobyhov Uezd before 1852)
Bykhov	Mogilev Governorate	1802-1919	Bykhov	Belarus	(Note: Starobyhov Uezd before 1852)
Bykhov	Gomel Governorate	1919-1923	Bykhov	Belarus	(Note: Starobyhov Uezd before 1852)

== C ==
Uezd	Region	Period	Capital	Now part of	Notes
Cahul	Bessarabia Governorate	1830–1878	Kagul (Cahul)	Moldova	
Cahul	Kingdom of Romania	1918–1940	Kagul (Cahul)	Moldova	
Cahul	Moldavian SSR	1940–1949	Kagul (Cahul)	Moldova	
Cahul	Moldova	1999–2002	Kagul (Cahul)	Moldova	
Chausy	Mogilev Governorate	1777-1778	Chausy	Belarus	
Chausy	Mogilev Viceroyalty	1778-1796	Chausy	Belarus	
Chausy	Belarus Governorate	1796-1802	Chausy	Belarus	
Chausy	Mogilev Governorate	1802-1919	Chausy	Belarus	
Chausy	Gomel Governorate	1919-1923	Chausy	Belarus	
Chelyabinsk	Perm Viceroyalty	1781–1782	Chelyabinsk	Russia	
Chelyabinsk	Ufa Governorate	1782–1796	Chelyabinsk	Russia	
Chelyabinsk	Orenburg Governorate	1796–1919	Chelyabinsk	Russia	
Chelyabinsk	Chelyabinsk Governorate	1919–1923	Chelyabinsk	Russia	
Cherdynsky	Perm Viceroyalty	1781–1796	Cherdyn	Russia	
Cherdynsky	Perm Governorate	1796–1923	Cherdyn	Russia	
Cherikov	Mogilev Governorate	1777-1778	Cherikov	Belarus	
Cherikov	Mogilev Viceroyalty	1778-1796	Cherikov	Belarus	
Cherikov	Belarus Governorate	1796-1802	Cherikov	Belarus	
Cherikov	Mogilev Governorate	1802-1919	Cherikov	Belarus	
Cherikov	Gomel Governorate	1919-1924	Cherikov	Belarus	
Chernigovsky	Chernigov Viceroyalty (1781–1796)	1781–1796	Chernigov (Chernihiv)	Ukraine	
Chernigovsky	Little Russia Governorate (1796–1802)	1796–1802	Chernigov (Chernihiv)	Ukraine	
Chernigovsky	Chernigov Governorate	1802–1923	Chernigov (Chernihiv)	Ukraine	
Chukotka Uyezd	Kamchatka Oblast	1909-1922	Uelen	Russia	
Chukotka Uyezd	Kamchatka Governorate	1922-1926	Uelen	Russia	
Kishinyovsky	Bessarabia Governorate	1836–1918	Kishinyov (Chișinău)	Moldova	
Kishinyovsky	Kingdom of Romania	1918–1940	Chișinău	Moldova	
Kishinyovsky	Moldavian SSR	1940–1949	Chișinău	Moldova	

== D ==
Uezd	Region	Period	Capital	Now part of	Notes
Dankov	Ryazan Governorate	1778–1924	Dankov	Russia	
Dilijan	Armenian SSR	1921–1929	Dilijan	Armenia	
Disnensky	Vilna Governorate	1793–1920	Disna (Dzisna)	Belarus	
Dzhevat	Baku Governorate	1869–1918	Salyan	Azerbaijan	
Dzhevat	ADR	1918–1920	Salyan	Azerbaijan	
Dzhevat	Azerbaijan SSR	1920–1930	Salyan	Azerbaijan	
Doblen	Courland Governorate	1819–1920	Doblen (Dobele)	Latvia	
Doblen	Latvia	1920–1940	Jelgava	Latvia	
Doblen	Latvian SSR	1940–1949	Jelgava	Latvia	
Dokshitsy	Minsk Governorate	1793–1797	Dokshytsy	Belarus	
Drissensky	Pskov Governorate	1772–1776	Drissa (Verkhnyadzvinsk)	Belarus, Latvia	
Drissensky	Polotsk Governorate	1776–1796	Drissa (Verkhnyadzvinsk)	Belarus, Latvia	
Drissensky	Vitebsk Governorate	1802–1923	Drissa (Verkhnyadzvinsk)	Belarus, Latvia	
Dubnensky	Wołyń Voivodeship	1795–1796	Dubno	Ukraine	
Dubnensky	Volhynian Governorate	1796–1921	Dubno	Ukraine	
Dusheti	Tiflis Governorate	1802–1918	Dusheti	Georgia	
Dusheti	DRG	1918–1921	Dusheti	Georgia	
Dusheti	Georgian SSR	1921–1929	Dusheti	Georgia	
Dvinsk	Pskov Governorate	1772–1776	Dünaburg (Daugavpils)	Latvia	
Dvinsk	Polotsk Governorate	1776–1796	Dünaburg (Daugavpils)	Latvia	
Dvinsk	Belarus Governorate	1796–1802	Dünaburg (Daugavpils)	Latvia	
Dvinsk	Vitebsk Governorate	1802–1893	Dünaburg (Daugavpils)	Latvia	
Dvinsk	Vitebsk Governorate	1893–1920	Dvinsk (Daugavpils)	Latvia	
Dvinsk	Latvia	1920–1940	Daugavpils	Latvia	
Dvinsk	Latvian SSR	1940–1949	Daugavpils	Latvia	
Dzhebrail	Elisabethpol Governorate	1873–1905	Jebrail (Jabrayil)	Azerbaijan	
Dzhebrail	Elisabethpol Governorate	1905–1918	Karyagino (Fuzuli)	Azerbaijan	
Dzhebrail	ADR	1918–1920	Karyagino (Fuzuli)	Azerbaijan	
Dzhebrail	Azerbaijan SSR	1920–1930	Sardar (Fuzuli)	Azerbaijan	
Dzhevanshir	Elisabethpol Governorate	1869–1918	Terter (Tartar)	Azerbaijan	
Dzhevanshir	ADR	1918–1920	Terter (Tartar)	Azerbaijan	
Dzhevanshir	Azerbaijan SSR	1920–1930	Terter (Tartar)	Azerbaijan	

== E ==
Uezd	Region	Period	Capital	Now part of	Notes
Etchmiadzin	Erivan Governorate	1849–1918	Echmiadzin (Vagharshapat)	Armenia	
Etchmiadzin	DRA	1918–1920	Echmiadzin (Vagharshapat)	Armenia	
Etchmiadzin	Armenian SSR	1920–1930	Echmiadzin (Vagharshapat)	Armenia	
Erivan	Armenian Oblast	1828–1840	Erivan (Yerevan)	Armenia, Azerbaijan, Turkey	
Erivan	Georgia-Imeretia Governorate	1840–1846	Erivan (Yerevan)	Armenia, Azerbaijan, Turkey	
Erivan	Tiflis Governorate	1846–1849	Erivan (Yerevan)	Armenia, Azerbaijan, Turkey	
Erivan	Erivan Governorate	1849–1918	Erivan (Yerevan)	Armenia, Azerbaijan, Turkey	
Erivan	DRA	1918–1920	Erivan (Yerevan)	Armenia, Azerbaijan, Turkey	
Erivan	Armenian SSR	1920–1930	Erivan (Yerevan)	Armenia, Azerbaijan, Turkey	

== F ==
Uezd	Region	Period	Capital	Now part of	Notes
Fellin	Riga Governorate	1745–1796	Fellin (Viljandi)	Estonia	
Fellin	Livonia Governorate	1796–1920	Fellin (Viljandi)	Estonia	
Friedrichstadt	Courland Governorate	1819–1920	Friedrichstadt (Jaunjelgava)	Latvia	
Friedrichstadt	Latvia	1920–1940	Friedrichstadt (Jaunjelgava)	Latvia	
Friedrichstadt	Latvian SSR	1940–1949	Friedrichstadt (Jaunjelgava)	Latvia	

== G ==
Uezd	Region	Period	Capital	Now part of	Notes
Gdovsky	Ingermanland Governorate		Gdov		
Gdovsky	Saint Petersburg Governorate		Gdov		
Gdovsky	Pskov Governorate		Gdov		
Gdovsky	Novgorod Governorate		Gdov		
Gomel	Mogilev Governorate	1777-1778	Belitsya (Until 1852); Gomel (Since 1852)	Belarus	(Note: Belitsya Uezd before 1852)
Gomel	Mogilev Viceroyalty	1778-1796	Belitsya (Until 1852); Gomel (Since 1852)	Belarus	(Note: Belitsya Uezd before 1852)
Gomel	Belarus Governorate	1796-1802	Belitsya (Until 1852); Gomel (Since 1852)	Belarus	(Note: Belitsya Uezd before 1852)
Gomel	Mogilev Governorate	1802-1919	Belitsya (Until 1852); Gomel (Since 1852)	Belarus	(Note: Belitsya Uezd before 1852)
Gomel	Gomel Governorate	1919-1926	Belitsya (Until 1852); Gomel (Since 1852)	Belarus	(Note: Belitsya Uezd before 1852)
Glazovsky	Vyatka Viceroyalty		Glazov		
Glazovsky	Vyatka Governorate		Glazov		
Glukhov County	Novgorod-Seversk Viceroyalty; Little Russia Governorate; Chernigov Governorate		Hlukhiv		
Goldingen County	Courland Governorate; Latvia		Kuldīga		
Gorki	Mogilev Governorate	1860-1919	Gorki	Belarus	
Gorki	Gomel Governorate	1919-1922	Gorki	Belarus	
Gorki	Smolensk Governorate	1922-1924	Gorki	Belarus	
Gori	Tiflis Governorate		Gori		
Gorodok County	Vitebsk Governorate				
Grayvoronsky	Kursk Governorate		Grayvoron		
Grobin County	Courland Governorate				
Grodno	Slonim Viceroyalty; Lithuania Governorate; Grodno Governorate		Grodno		
Gaisin	Podolia Governorate; Bratslav Viceroyalty		Haisyn		

== H ==
uezd	Region	Capital
Harrien County	Estonia Governorate	
Hasenpoth County	Courland Governorate	

== I ==
Uezd	Region	Capital
Igumensky	Minsk Governorate; Byelorussian Soviet Socialist Republic	Chervyen
Illuxt County	Courland Governorate	

== K ==
Uezd	Region	Period	Capital	Now part of	Notes
Kamenets-Podolsky	Podolia Governorate		Kamenets-Podolsky		
Kamyshinsky	Saratov Governorate		Kamyshin		
Kanev	Kiev Governorate		Kanev		
Kazakh	Elisabethpol Governorate		Kazakh (Gazakh)		
Kazan	Kazan Province; Kazan vicegerency Kazan Governorate		Kazan		
Kharkov	Kharkov Governorate		Kharkov		
Kherson	Odessa Governorate; Kherson Governorate		Kherson		
Khoper region	Don Host Oblast; Don Oblast; Tsaritsyn Governorate				
Khotin	Bessarabia Governorate		Khotin		
Khvalynsk	Saratov Governorate		Khvalynsk		
Klimovichy	Mogilev Governorate	1777-1778	Klimovichy	Belarus	
Klimovichy	Mogilev Viceroyalty	1778-1796	Klimovichy	Belarus	
Klimovichy	Belarus Governorate	1796-1802	Klimovichy	Belarus	
Klimovichy	Mogilev Governorate	1802-1919	Klimovichy	Belarus	
Klimovichy	Gomel Governorate	1919-1924	Klimovichy	Belarus	
Kyumen County	Vyborg Governorate				
Kobelyaky	Poltava Governorate		Kobeliaky		
Kobrinsky	Grodno Governorate		Kobrin		
Kolomensky	Moscow Province; Moscow Governorate		Kolomna		
Kolo	Kalisz Governorate		Koło		
Kolsky					
Konotop	Novgorod-Seversk Viceroyalty; Chernigov Viceroyalty; Little Russia Governorate; Chernigov Governorate		Konotop		
Konstantinograd	Poltava Governorate				
Kopore	Saint Petersburg Governorate; Sankt Petersburg Province; Ingermanland Governorate				
Kopys	Mogilev Governorate	1777-1778	Kopys	Belarus	
Kopys	Mogilev Viceroyalty	1778-1796	Kopys	Belarus	
Kopys	Belarus Governorate	1796-1802	Kopys	Belarus	
Kopys	Mogilev Governorate	1802-1861	Kopys	Belarus	
Korochansky	Kursk Governorate		Korocha		
Kostroma	Kostroma Governorate		Kostroma		
Kovel County	Wołyń Voivodeship		Kovel		
Kovensky	Kovno Governorate; Vilna Governorate; Lithuania Governorate		Kaunas		
Kovrovsky	Vladimir Governorate; Vladimir Viceroyalty		Kovrov		
Kozelets	Chernigov Governorate		Kozelets		
Kozelsk	Tsardom of Russia; Moscow Governorate; Kaluga Province; Kaluga Viceroyalty; Kaluga Governorate		Kozelsk		
Krasnoufimsky	Perm Governorate		Krasnoufimsk		
Kremenets	Volhynian Viceroyalty; Volhynian Governorate		Kremenets		
Krivorozhskij County	Novorossiysk Governorate; Yekaterinoslav Governorate		Kryvyi Rih		
Kronoborgs härad	Vyborg Governorate				
Kungursky	Perm Governorate				
Kurgansky	Tobolsk Governorate; Chelyabinsk Governorate				
Kutaisskij County					

== L ==
uezd	Region	Capital
Lapvesiskij County	Vyborg Governorate of the Russian Empire	
Lebedin uezd	Kharkov Governorate	Lebedyn
Lepsinskij County	Semirechye Oblast; Semipalatinsk Oblast	Lepsy
Lipovets County	Kiev Governorate	Lypovets
Litin County	Podolia Governorate	Khmilnyk; Lityn
Ljutsinskij County	Pskov Governorate; Polotsk Governorate; Belarus Governorate; Vitebsk Governorate; Latvia; Latvian Soviet Socialist Republic	Ludza
Lodeynopolsky uezd	Olonets Viceroyalty; Novgorod Governorate; Olonets Governorate; Saint Petersburg Governorate	Lodeynoye Pole
Lubenskij County	Poltava Governorate; Kiev Viceroyalty; Little Russia Governorate	Lubny
Lutsk County	Wołyń Voivodeship; Volhynian Governorate	Lutsk
Luzhsky uezd	Saint Petersburg Governorate; Pskov Viceroyalty	

== M ==
Uezd	Region	Period	Capital	Now part of	Notes
Mariampolski County	Suwałki Governorate		Marijampolė		
Meshtshovskij County	Grand Duchy of Moscow; Tsardom of Russia; Smolensk Governorate; Moscow Governorate; Kaluga Province; Kaluga Viceroyalty; Kaluga Governorate		Meshchovsk		
Mglin County	Chernigov Governorate; Gomel Governorate; Little Russia Governorate; Novgorod-Seversk Viceroyalty		Mglin		
Minsky uezd	Minsk Governorate; Byelorussian Soviet Socialist Republic		Minsk		
Mogilev	Mogilev Governorate	1772-1778	Mogilev	Belarus	
Mogilev	Mogilev Viceroyalty	1778-1796	Mogilev	Belarus	
Mogilev	Belarus Governorate	1796-1802	Mogilev	Belarus	
Mogilev	Mogilev Governorate	1802-1919	Mogilev	Belarus	
Mogilev	Gomel Governorate	1919-1924	Mogilev	Belarus	
Mologskij County					
Mozyrsky	Minsk Governorate; Byelorussian Soviet Socialist Republic		Mazyr		
Mstislavl	Mogilev Governorate	1772-1778	Mstislavl	Belarus	
Mstislavl	Mogilev Viceroyalty	1778-1796	Mstislavl	Belarus	
Mstislavl	Belarus Governorate	1796-1802	Mstislavl	Belarus	
Mstislavl	Mogilev Governorate	1802-1919	Mstislavl	Belarus	
Mstislavl	Smolensk Governorate	1919-1924	Mstislavl	Belarus	

== N ==
uezd	Region	Capital
Nakhichevan	Erivan Governorate; Tiflis Governorate; Georgia-Imeretia Governorate	Nakhichevan (Nakhchivan)
Narovchatsky	Penza Governorate	Narovtšat
Nevelskij	Pskov Governorate; Vitebsk Governorate	Nevel
Nizhegorodsky Uyezd		
Nizhnedevitskij County	Voronezh Governorate	Nizhnedevitsk
Njasviskij County	Minsk Governorate	
Novgorod County	Administrative division of Novgorod Land; Saint Petersburg Governorate; Novgorod Governorate; Ingermanland Governorate; Novgorod Republic	Veliky Novgorod
Novgorod-Severskij County	Chernigov Governorate	Novhorod-Siverskyi
Novoalexandrovsky	Kovno Governorate; Vilna Governorate; Lithuania Governorate	
Nor-Bayazet	Erivan Governorate	Novo-Bayazet (Gavar)
Novogrudsky	Minsk Governorate; Grodno Governorate; Lithuania Governorate; Slonim Viceroyalty	Navahrudak
Novooskolskij County	Kursk Governorate	Novy Oskol
Novorzhevskij County	Pskov Governorate	Novorzhev
Nukhinsky uezd	Elisabethpol Governorate	Shaki

== O ==
Uezd	Region	Period	Capital	Now part of	Notes
Okhansky	Perm Governorate		Okhansk		
okroug de Verkhneoudinsk	Transbaikal Oblast; Irkutsk Governorate				
Olonetsky	Olonets Governorate		Olonets		
Olviopolskij County					
Omsk	Aqmola Oblast		Omsk		
Ordubad			Ordubad		
Orsha	Mogilev Governorate	1772-1778	Orsha	Belarus	
Orsha	Mogilev Viceroyalty	1778-1796	Orsha	Belarus	
Orsha	Belarus Governorate	1796-1802	Orsha	Belarus	
Orsha	Mogilev Governorate	1802-1919	Orsha	Belarus	
Orsha	Gomel Governorate	1919-1920	Orsha	Belarus	
Orsha	Vitebsk Governorate	1920-1924	Orsha	Belarus	
Orsk County	Orenburg Governorate		Orsk		
Ösel County	Livonia Governorate		Kuressaare		
Oshmyany County	Vilna Governorate				
Osinsky	Perm Governorate		Osa		
Ostrog County					
Otdel de Yeisk	Kuban Oblast; Kuban People's Republic; Kuban Soviet Republic; Kuban-Black Sea Soviet Republic; North Caucasian Soviet Republic; Kuban-Black Sea Oblast				
Ouïezd de Pavlovo	Nizhny Novgorod Governorate				
Ouïezd de Podolsk	Moscow Governorate				
Ouïezd de Tcherepovets	Novgorod Governorate; Cherepovets Governorate		Cherepovets		
Ouïezd de Viazma	Smolensk Governorate				
Ozurgeti uezd	Kutaisi Governorate		Ozurgeti		

== P ==
Uezd	Region	Period	Capital	Now part of	Notes
Pavlodar	Semipalatinsk Oblast		Pavlodar		
Penza	Penza Governorate; Saratov Governorate; Central Wolga Oblast		Penza		
Perejaslavskij County	Poltava Governorate; Kiev Governorate; Little Russia Governorate; Kiev Viceroyalty				
Permsky	Perm Governorate; Perm Viceroyalty		Perm		
Pernau	Livonia Governorate				
Petergofsky	Saint Petersburg Governorate		Petergof		
Petropavlovskij					
Petrozavodsky	Olonets Oblast; Olonets Viceroyalty; Novgorod Governorate; Olonets Governorate		Petrozavodsk		
Pinsky	Minsk Governorate		Pinsk		
Pirjatinskij County	Poltava Governorate				
Poltavskij County	Novorossiysk Governorate; Yekaterinoslav Viceroyalty; Little Russia Governorate; Poltava Governorate		Poltava		
Porkhov	Pskov Governorate		Porkhov		
Povenetsky					
Powiat jampolski	Podolia Governorate		Yampil, Vinnytsia Oblast		
Powiat latyczowski	Podolia Governorate		Letychiv; Derazhnia		
Powiat zasławski	Volhynian Governorate				
Prilukskij County	Poltava Governorate		Pryluky		
Pronsk County	Ryazan Governorate		Pronsk		
Pruzhanskij County	Grodno Governorate; Slonim Viceroyalty; Lithuania Governorate		Pruzhany		
Pskov County	Pskov Governorate; Pskov Viceroyalty; Pskov Province; Saint Petersburg Governorate		Pskov		

== R ==
Uezd	Region	Period	Capital	Now part of	Notes
Racha uezd	Kutais Governorate		Oni		
Radomysl County	Kiev Governorate				
Rajajoki härad	Vyborg Governorate of the Russian Empire				
Raseinių apskritis					
Rechitsky	Minsk Governorate; Chernigov Viceroyalty; Gomel Governorate		Rechytsa		
Rezhitsa County	Vitebsk Governorate				
Riga	Livonia Governorate; Latvian Soviet Socialist Republic		Riga		
Rogachev	Mogilev Governorate	1772–1778	Rogachev	Belarus	
Rogachev	Mogilev Viceroyalty	1778–1796	Rogachev	Belarus	
Rogachev	Belarus Governorate	1796–1802	Rogachev	Belarus	
Rogachev	Mogilev Governorate	1802–1919	Rogachev	Belarus	
Rogachev	Gomel Governorate	1919–1924	Rogachev	Belarus	

== S ==
Uezd	Region	Period	Capital	Now part of	Notes
Saint Peterburg	Sankt Petersburg Province; Saint Petersburg Governorate		Saint Petersburg		
Sebezh	Pskov Governorate; Vitebsk Governorate; Belarus Governorate; Polotsk Governorate				
Semipalatinsk County	Semipalatinsk Governorate of the Kirghiz Autonomous Socialist Soviet Republic; Semipalatinsk Oblast; Omsk Oblast; Tobolsk Governorate; Siberia Governorate		Semey		
Senaki	Kutaisi Governorate		Senaki		
Sengiley County	Simbirsk Governorate		Sengiley		
Senno	Mogilev Governorate	1777–1778	Senno	Belarus	
Senno	Mogilev Viceroyalty	1778–1796	Senno	Belarus	
Senno	Belarus Governorate	1796–1802	Senno	Belarus	
Senno	Mogilev Governorate	1802–1919	Senno	Belarus	
Senno	Vitebsk Governorate	1919–1923	Senno	Belarus	
Serpuhovsky	Moscow Governorate		Serpukhov		
Sharur-Daralayaz	Erivan Governorate		Bashnorashen (Sharur)		
Shavelsky	Kovno Governorate; Vilna Governorate		Šiauliai		
Shlisselburgsky	Saint Petersburg Governorate		Shlisselburg		
Shushа	Elisabethpol Governorate		Shusha		
Signakh	Tiflis Governorate		Signakh (Signagi)		
Simbirsky	Simbirsk Governorate		Ulyanovsk		
Simferopol	Taurida Governorate		Simferopol		
Skvira County	Kiev Governorate; Bratslav Viceroyalty		Skvyra		
Slonimsky	Grodno Governorate		Slonim		
Slutsk	Minsk Governorate; Byelorussian Soviet Socialist Republic		Slutsk		
Smolensk	Smolensk Governorate				
Solikamsky	Perm Governorate; Perm Oblast				
Solotonoschski Ujesd	Poltava Governorate; Kremenchuk Governorate		Zolotonosha		
Sordavala härad	Vyborg Governorate		Sortavala		
Sorokskij County	Bessarabia Governorate				
Starodubsky	Bryansk Governorate		Starodub		
Stavropolskiy County	Samara Governorate; Simbirsk Governorate		Tolyatti		
Stranda County	Viipuri Province		Vyborg		
Surazhskij County	Polotsk Governorate; Vitebsk Governorate				
Surmalu	Erivan Governorate		Igdyr (Iğdır)		
Svijazhskij County	Kazan Governorate		Sviyazhsk		

== T ==
uezd	Region	Capital
Talsen County	Courland Governorate	
Tarashtsha County	Kiev Governorate	
Tarusa County	Kaluga Viceroyalty; Kaluga Governorate; Moscow Province; Moscow Governorate	Tarusa
Telavi uezd	Tiflis Governorate	Telavi
Telshi County		
Tiflis uezd	Tiflis Governorate	Tbilisi
Tionety uezd	Tiflis Governorate	Tionety (Tianeti)
Troitsk County		
Troki County	Vilna Governorate	Trakai
Tsarskoselskiy uezd	Saint Petersburg Governorate	Tsarskoye Selo
Tsherkassy County	Kiev Governorate; Kremenchuk Governorate	Cherkasy
Tshiginskij County	Kiev Governorate; Kremenchuk Governorate; Voznesensk Viceroyalty	Chyhyryn
Tshukhlomskoy County	Kostroma Governorate	Chukhloma
Tuckum County	Courland Governorate; Latvia; Latvian Soviet Socialist Republic	Tukums
Tulsky County	Tula Governorate	Tula
Tverskoy uezd	Tver Governorate	Tver
Tyumensky uezd	Tobolsk Governorate	Tyumen

== U ==
uezd	Region	Capital
Ufa uezd	Ufa Governorate	
Uglitsh County	Yaroslavl Governorate; Rybinsk Governorate; Yaroslavl Viceroyalty	Uglich
Uman County	Kiev Governorate	Uman
Ushitsa County	Podolia Governorate	Nova Ushytsia; Stara Ushytsia
Ust-Sysolsk County	Vologda Governorate; Vologda Viceroyalty; Northern Dvina Governorate; Komi-Zyryan Autonomous Oblast	Syktyvkar

== V ==
uezd	Region	Capital
Valdaysky County	Novgorod Governorate; Novgorod Province	Valday
Valki County	Kharkov Governorate; Sloboda Ukraine Governorate; Kharkov Viceroyalty	Valky
Varnavinskij County	Nizhny Novgorod Governorate	Varnavino
Varshavskij County	Warsaw Voivodeship	Warsaw
Vasilkov County	Kiev Governorate	
Velizh County	Polotsk Governorate; Belarus Governorate; Vitebsk Governorate; Pskov Governorate	
Verkhnedneprovsk County	Yekaterinoslav Governorate	Verkhnodniprovsk
Verkhotursky uezd	Perm Governorate; Yekaterinburg Governorate; Perm Viceroyalty	Verkhoturye
Vesyegonsky uezd	Tver Governorate	Vesyegonsk
Vetluga uezd	Kostroma Viceroyalty; Kostroma Governorate; Nizhny Novgorod Governorate	Vetluga
Viipurin kihlakunta	Viipuri Province	
Vilensky uezd	Vilna Governorate; Lithuania Governorate	Vilnius
Vileysky uezd	Western Oblast	Vileyka
Vilkomir County	Kovno Governorate	Ukmergė
Vinnytsia County	Podolia Governorate	Vinnytsia
Vitebsk County	Vitebsk Governorate	
Volkovysk County	Slonim Viceroyalty; Lithuania Governorate; Grodno Governorate	Vawkavysk
Volodymyr-Volynsky uezd	Volhynian Governorate	Volodymyr-Volynskyi
Voronezh County	Voronezh Governorate; Voronezh Province	Voronezh
Vyatka uezd	Vyatka Governorate	
Vyshny Volotshyok County	Tver Governorate; Tver Viceroyalty; Novgorod Governorate	Vyshny Volochyok

== W ==
uezd	Region	Capital
Walk County	Livonia Governorate; Latvian Soviet Socialist Republic	Walk
Wenden County	Livonia Governorate	Cēsis
Werro County	Livonia Governorate	
Wiek County	Estonia Governorate	Haapsalu
Wierland County	Estonia Governorate	
Windau County	Courland Governorate	
Wolmar County	Livonia Governorate	Valmiera

== Y ==
uezd	Region	Capital
Yadrinsky uezd	Kazan Governorate	Yadrin
Yaltinsky uezd	Taurida Governorate	Yalta
Yalutorovsky uezd		Yalutorovsk
Yamburgsky uezd	Saint Petersburg Governorate; Sankt Petersburg Province	
Yaransky uezd	Vyatka Governorate	Yaransk
Yarensky uezd	Vologda Governorate; Siberia Governorate; Ustyug Province; Northern Dvina Governorate	Yarensk
Yaskisky uezd	Viipuri Province	Yaskis (Lesogorsky)
Yekaterinburgsky County	Perm Governorate	Yekaterinburg
Yeletsky uezd	Oryol Governorate; Oryol Viceroyalty; Central Black Earth Oblast	Yelets
Yelizavetpolsky uezd	Georgia-Imeretia Governorate; Tiflis Governorate; Elisabethpol Governorate; Azerbaijan Soviet Socialist Republic	Yelizavetpol (Ganja)
Yelninsky uezd	Smolensk Governorate	Yelnya
Yevpatoria County	Taurida Governorate	Yevpatoria
Yukhnovsky uezd	Smolensk Governorate; Kaluga Governorate; Smolensk Viceroyalty	Yukhnov
Yuryevsky uezd	Livonia Governorate; Estonia Governorate	Dorpat / Yuryev (Tartu)
Yuryevsky uezd	Vladimir Viceroyalty; Vladimir Governorate	Yuryev-Polsky

== Z ==
uezd	Region	Capital
Zangezur uezd	Elisabethpol Governorate	Goris
Zvenigorodka County	Kiev Governorate	

== Б ==
uezd	Region	Capital
Балаганский уезд		
Балахнинский уезд	Nizhny Novgorod Governorate	Balakhna
Балашовский уезд	Saratov Governorate; Astrakhan Governorate; Lower Volga Krai	Balashov
Балтский уезд	Podolia Governorate; Odessa Governorate	Balta
Баргузинский уезд	Buryat Autonomous Soviet Socialist Republic; Pribaykal Oblast; Transbaikal Oblast	
Барнаульский уезд	Siberia Krai; Altai Governorate; Tomsk Governorate	Barnaul
Бахмутский уезд	Azov Governorate; Bakhmut Province; Yekaterinoslav Viceroyalty; Novorossiysk Governorate; Yekaterinoslav Governorate; Donetsian Governorate	Bakhmut
Белгородский уезд	Kursk Governorate; Ukrainian People's Republic; Belgorod Governorate; Kiev Governorate; Tsardom of Russia	Belgorod
Белёвский уезд	Tula Governorate; Tula Viceroyalty	Belyov
Белостокский уезд	Belostok Oblast; Grodno Governorate	Białystok
Бердянский уезд	Taurida Governorate	
Берёзовский уезд	Tobolsk Governorate	
Бийский уезд	Tomsk Governorate; Altai Governorate	Biysk
Бирский уезд	Ufa Governorate	
Бирюченский уезд	Voronezh Governorate	Biryuch; Alexeyevka
Благодарненский уезд		
Бобринецкий уезд	Kherson Governorate	Bobrynets
Бобровский уезд	Voronezh Governorate	Bobrov
Богатенский уезд		
Богородицкий уезд	Tula Governorate	Bogoroditsk
Богородский уезд	Moscow Governorate	Noginsk
Богучарский уезд	Voronezh Governorate	Boguchar
Болховский уезд	Oryol Governorate; Oryol Viceroyalty; Central Black Earth Oblast	Bolkhov
Боровичский уезд	Novgorod Governorate	Borovichi
Боровский уезд	Moscow Governorate; Moscow Province; Kaluga Viceroyalty; Kaluga Governorate	Borovsk
Бронницкий уезд	Moscow Governorate	Bronnitsy
Брянский уезд	Bryansk Governorate; Oryol Governorate; Oryol Viceroyalty; Belgorod Governorate; Sevsk Province; Kiev Governorate	Bryansk
Бугульминский уезд	Samara Governorate; Orenburg Governorate	Bugulma
Бугурусланский уезд	Samara Governorate	Buguruslan
Бузулукский уезд	Samara Governorate	Buzuluk
Буинский уезд	Simbirsk Governorate	Buinsk
Буйский уезд	Kostroma Governorate	Buy
Важский уезд	Archangelgorod Governorate	Shenkursk
Валуйский уезд	Voronezh Governorate; Belgorod Governorate; Belgorod Province	Valuyki
Васильсурский уезд	Nizhny Novgorod Governorate	Vasilsursk
Веденский округ		
Великолукский уезд	Pskov Governorate; Pskov Viceroyalty; Velikiye Luki Province; Saint Petersburg Governorate; Ingermanland Governorate	Velikiye Luki
Великоустюжский уезд	Vologda Governorate	Veliky Ustyug
Вельский уезд	Vologda Governorate	Velsk
Велюнский уезд	Kalisz Governorate	
Венёвский уезд	Tula Governorate; Tula Viceroyalty	Venyov
Верейский уезд	Moscow Governorate	
Верненский уезд	Semirechye Oblast	Almaty
Верхнеуральский уезд	Orenburg Governorate	
Верхоленский уезд	Irkutsk Governorate	
Владимирский уезд	Vladimir Governorate	Vladimir
Владиславовский уезд	Suwałki Governorate	Kudirkos Naumiestis
Волковышский уезд	Suwałki Governorate	Vilkaviškis
Вологодский уезд	Vologda Governorate	Vologda
Волоколамский уезд	Moscow Governorate	
Волчанский уезд	Kharkov Governorate	
Вольский уезд	Saratov Governorate	Volsk
Воскресенский уезд (Нижегородская губерния)		
Вытегорский уезд	Saint Petersburg Governorate; Olonets Governorate; Novgorod Governorate; Olonets Viceroyalty; Olonets Oblast	
Вязниковский уезд	Vladimir Governorate	Vyazniki
Галичский уезд	Kostroma Governorate; Kostroma Viceroyalty; Archangelgorod Governorate	
Геокчайский уезд	Baku Governorate	Goychay
Гжатский уезд	Smolensk Governorate	
Горбатовский уезд	Nizhny Novgorod Governorate	Gorbatov
Городецкий уезд (Нижегородская губерния)		
Городищенский уезд	Penza Governorate	Gorodishche
Гороховецкий уезд	Vladimir Governorate	Gorokhovets
Грозненский округ	Terek Oblast	
Грязовецкий уезд	Vologda Governorate	Gryazovets
Гунибский округ		
Гурьевский уезд	Ural Oblast; Uralsk Governorate	Atyrau
Гусевской уезд	Vladimir Governorate	Gus-Khrustalny
Даниловский уезд		
Даргинский округ		
Демянский уезд	Novgorod Governorate	Demyansk
Дешкинский уезд	Oryol Viceroyalty; Oryol Governorate	
Джаркентский уезд	Semirechye Oblast	Zharkent
Дмитриевский уезд	Kursk Governorate	Dmitriyev
Дмитровский уезд	Oryol Governorate; Central Black Earth Oblast	Dmitrovsk
Дмитровский уезд	Moscow Governorate	Dmitrov
Днепровский уезд	Taurida Governorate	Oleshky
Дорогобужский уезд	Smolensk Governorate; Smolensk Viceroyalty	Dorogobuzh
Духовщинский уезд	Smolensk Governorate	Yartsevo
Егорьевский уезд	Ryazan Governorate; Moscow Governorate	Yegoryevsk
Екатеринославский уезд	Yekaterinoslav Governorate	Dnipro
Елабужский уезд	Vyatka Governorate	Yelabuga
Елатомский уезд	Ryazan Governorate; Tambov Governorate	
Елисаветградский уезд	Kherson Governorate; Nikoayev governorate Novorossiysk Governorate; Yekaterinoslav Viceroyalty; Voznesensk Viceroyalty; Odessa Governorate	Kropyvnytskyi
Енисейский уезд		
Енотаевский уезд		
Епифанский уезд	Tula Governorate; Tula Viceroyalty	Yepifan
Ефремовский уезд	Tula Governorate; Tula Viceroyalty	Yefremov
Жиздринский уезд	Kaluga Governorate; Kaluga Viceroyalty; Bryansk Governorate	Zhizdra
Задонский уезд		
Зарайский уезд	Ryazan Governorate	Zaraysk
Звенигородский уезд	Moscow Governorate	
Землянский уезд	Voronezh Governorate	
Златоустовский уезд		
Змеиногорский уезд		
Зубцовский уезд	Tver Governorate; Tver Viceroyalty	
Зугдидский уезд	Kutaisi Governorate	Zugdidi
Измаильский уезд	Bessarabia Governorate	Izmail
Изюмский уезд	Kharkov Governorate	Izium
Ингушский округ		
Инсарский уезд	Penza Governorate; Simbirsk Governorate	Insar
Ирбитский уезд	Perm Governorate	Irbit
Иргизский уезд		
Иркутский уезд	Irkutsk Governorate	Irkutsk
Ишимский уезд	Tobolsk Governorate; Tyumen Governorate; Aqmola Oblast; Omsk Governorate	Ishim
Кадниковский уезд	Vologda Governorate	Kadnikov
Каинский уезд	Tomsk Governorate	Kuybyshev
Калачинский уезд		
Калишский уезд	Kalisz Governorate	Kalisz
Калмыцкий округ		
Калужский уезд	Moscow Governorate; Kaluga Province; Kaluga Viceroyalty; Kaluga Governorate	Kaluga
Кальварийский уезд	Suwałki Governorate	
Калязинский уезд	Tver Governorate; Tver Viceroyalty	
Камышловский уезд	Perm Viceroyalty; Perm Governorate; Yekaterinburg Governorate	Kamyshlov
Канский уезд		
Карачевский уезд	Bryansk Governorate; Oryol Governorate; Oryol Viceroyalty; Belgorod Governorate; Sevsk Province; Kiev Governorate	
Каргопольский уезд	Vologda Governorate; Olonets Governorate	Kargopol
Карсунский уезд	Simbirsk Governorate	Карсун
Касимовский уезд	Ryazan Governorate	Kasimov
Кашинский уезд	Tver Governorate; Tver Viceroyalty; Moscow Governorate; Uglich Province; Saint Petersburg Governorate; Ingermanland Governorate	Kashin
Каширский уезд	Tula Governorate; Tula Viceroyalty	Kashira
Кеврольский уезд	Archangelgorod Governorate	
Кексгольмский уезд	Vyborg Governorate of the Russian Empire	Priozersk
Кемский уезд	Arkhangelsk Governorate	Kem
Керенский уезд	Penza Governorate	
Киевский уезд		
Кизлярский отдел		
Кимрский уезд	Tver Governorate	Kimry
Кинешемский уезд	Kostroma Governorate	Kineshma
Киренский уезд		
Киржачский уезд		
Кирилловский уезд	Novgorod Governorate; Cherepovets Governorate	
Кирсановский уезд		
Клинский уезд	Moscow Governorate	Klin
Княгининский уезд		
Козловский уезд	Tambov Governorate	
Кокандский уезд	Fergana Oblast	Kokand
Кокчетавский уезд		
Кологривский уезд	Kostroma Governorate	Kologriv
Конинский уезд	Kalisz Governorate	
Копальский уезд	Semirechye Oblast; Semipalatinsk Oblast	Qapal; Taldykorgan
Коротоякский уезд	Voronezh Governorate	
Корчевской уезд	Tver Governorate	
Котельничский уезд	Vyatka Governorate; Vyatka Viceroyalty	
Крапивенский уезд	Tula Governorate; Tula Viceroyalty; Moscow Province	Plavsk
Краснинский уезд	Smolensk Governorate	
Красноборский уезд		
Красноводский уезд		
Краснокутський повіт	Kharkov Viceroyalty	Krasnokutsk
Краснослободский уезд	Penza Governorate; Nizhny Novgorod Governorate	Krasnoslobodsk
Краснохолмский уезд	Tver Governorate	Krasny Kholm
Красноярский уезд (Астраханская губерния)		
Красноярский уезд (Енисейская губерния)	Yeniseysk Governorate	Krasnoyarsk
Кременчугский уезд	Poltava Governorate; Kremenchuk Governorate	Kremenchuk
Крестецкий уезд	Novgorod Governorate	
Кромский уезд	Oryol Governorate; Oryol Viceroyalty	Kromy
Кроноборгский уезд	Vyborg Governorate of the Russian Empire	Kurkijoki
Кубинский уезд		
Кузнецкий уезд	Saratov Governorate	Kuznetsk
Кузнецкий уезд (Сибирская губерния)		
Кузнецкий уезд (Томская губерния)	Tomsk Governorate	Novokuznetsk
Курмышский уезд	Simbirsk Governorate	Kurmysh, Pilninsky District
Курский уезд	Belgorod Governorate; Kursk Governorate	
Кустанайский уезд	Kazak Autonomous Socialist Soviet Republic; Chelyabinsk Governorate; Turgay Oblast	Kostanay
Кюменский уезд	Viipuri Province	Kotka
Лаишевский уезд	Kazan Governorate; Kazan vicegerency	Laishevo
Лальский уезд		
Лаппвесиский уезд	Vyborg Governorate of the Russian Empire	Lappeenranta
Лбищенский уезд	Ural Oblast	Chapaev, Kazakhstan
Лебедянский уезд	Tambov Governorate	
Ленкоранский уезд		
Ленчицкий уезд	Kalisz Governorate	
Лепельский уезд	Vitebsk Governorate	
Лечхумский уезд		
Ливенский уезд	Oryol Governorate; Oryol Viceroyalty; Central Black Earth Oblast	Livny
Ливенский уезд	Sloboda Ukraine Governorate	Livenka, Belgorod Oblast
Лидский уезд	Vilna Governorate	Lida
Липецкий уезд	Tambov Governorate; Central Black Earth Oblast	Lipetsk
Лихвинский уезд	Kaluga Province; Kaluga Viceroyalty; Kaluga Governorate	Chekalin
Луганский уезд	Oryol Viceroyalty	
Лукояновский уезд		
Лушский уезд	Kostroma Viceroyalty	Lukh
Лысковский уезд		
Льговский уезд	Kursk Governorate	Lgov
Любимский уезд	Yaroslavl Governorate	
Макарьевский уезд	Ivanovo-Voznesensk Governorate; Kostroma Governorate; Kostroma Viceroyalty	
Макарьевский уезд (Нижегородская губерния)		
Малмыжский уезд	Vyatka Governorate	
Малоархангельский уезд	Oryol Governorate	Maloarkhangelsk
Малоярославецкий уезд	Moscow Province; Kaluga Viceroyalty; Kaluga Governorate	Maloyaroslavets
Мамадышский уезд	Kazan Governorate	Mamadysh
Маңғыстау уезі		
Маргеланский уезд	Fergana Oblast	Fergana
Мариинский уезд	Tomsk Governorate	Mariinsk
Мариупольский уезд	Yekaterinoslav Governorate	Mariupol
Медвеженский уезд	Stavropol Governorate	Krasnogvardeyskoye, Stavropol Krai
Медынский уезд	Kaluga Province; Kaluga Viceroyalty; Kaluga Governorate	Medyn
Мезенский уезд	Arkhangelsk Governorate	Mezen
Меленковский уезд	Vladimir Governorate	Melenki
Мелитопольский уезд	Taurida Governorate	Melitopol
Мензелинский уезд	Orenburg Governorate; Ufa Governorate	Menzelinsk
Мервский уезд		
Минусинский уезд	Yeniseysk Governorate	Minusinsk
Миргородский уезд	Poltava Governorate	Myrhorod
Миусский округ		
Михайловский уезд	Ryazan Governorate	
Можайский уезд	Moscow Governorate	
Моздокский отдел		
Мокшанский уезд	Penza Governorate	Mokshan
Моршанский уезд	Tambov Governorate	Morshansk
Мосальский уезд	Kaluga Governorate; Kaluga Viceroyalty; Moscow Governorate; Kaluga Province	Mosalsk
Московский уезд	Moscow Governorate	Moscow
Муромский уезд	Vladimir Governorate	Murom
Мценский уезд	Oryol Viceroyalty; Oryol Governorate	Mtsensk
Мышкинский уезд		
Мятлевский уезд	Kaluga Governorate	Myatlevo
Нальчикский округ		
Наманганский уезд	Fergana Oblast	Namangan
Нежинский уезд	Chernigov Viceroyalty; Little Russia Governorate; Chernigov Governorate	Nizhyn
Нерехтский уезд	Kostroma Governorate	
Нерчинский уезд		
Нерчинско-Заводский уезд		
Нижнеломовский уезд	Penza Governorate	Nizhny Lomov
Нижнеудинский уезд		
Николаевский уезд	Samara Governorate; Saratov Governorate; Lower Volga Krai	Pugachyov
Никольский уезд	Vologda Governorate	Nikolsk
Новозыбковский уезд	Chernigov Governorate; Gomel Governorate; Bryansk Governorate	Novozybkov
Новоладожский уезд	Saint Petersburg Governorate; Novgorod Governorate; Novgorod Province	Novaya Ladoga
Новоместский уезд	Chernigov Governorate; Little Russia Governorate; Novgorod-Seversk Viceroyalty	
Новомосковский уезд	Yekaterinoslav Governorate	Novomoskovsk
Новосильский уезд	Tula Governorate; Tula Viceroyalty; Oryol Governorate; Central Black Earth Oblast	Novosil
Новоторжский уезд	Tver Governorate; Tver Viceroyalty; Tver Province; Saint Petersburg Governorate; Ingermanland Governorate	Torzhok
Новоузенский уезд	Samara Governorate; Saratov Governorate	Novouzensk
Новохопёрский уезд	Voronezh Governorate	
Нолинский уезд	Vyatka Viceroyalty; Vyatka Governorate	
Обоянский уезд	Kursk Governorate; Belgorod Governorate; Belgorod Province	Oboyan
Одесский уезд	Kherson Governorate; Odessa Governorate	Odessa
Одоевский уезд	Tula Governorate; Tula Viceroyalty; Kaluga Province	
Онежский уезд	Arkhangelsk Governorate	Onega
Опочецкий уезд	Pskov Governorate	
Орал уезі	Ural Oblast; Uralsk Governorate	Oral
Оргеевский уезд	Bessarabia Governorate; Moldavian Democratic Republic; Kingdom of Romania; Moldavian Soviet Socialist Republic; Moldova	
Оренбургский уезд		
Орловский уезд	Oryol Governorate	Oryol
Орловский уезд (Вятская губерния)		
Осташковский уезд	Tver Governorate	
Остерский уезд	Chernigov Governorate	Oster
Островский уезд	Pskov Governorate	
Острогожский уезд	Voronezh Governorate; Sloboda Ukraine Governorate	Ostrogozhsk
Ошский уезд	Fergana Oblast	Osh
Павловский уезд	Voronezh Governorate	
Павлоградский уезд	Yekaterinoslav Governorate	
Перекопский уезд		
Перемышльский уезд	Kaluga Province; Kaluga Viceroyalty; Kaluga Governorate	Peremyshl
Переславский уезд	Vladimir Governorate	
Петровский уезд	Saratov Governorate	Petrovsk
Печорский уезд	Arkhangelsk Governorate	Ust-Tsilma
Пинежский уезд	Arkhangelsk Governorate	Pinega
Погарский уезд	Novgorod-Seversk Viceroyalty	Pogar
Покровский уезд	Vladimir Governorate	Pokrov
Полоцкий уезд	Vitebsk Governorate; Belarus Governorate; Polotsk Governorate	Polotsk
Поневежский уезд	Kovno Governorate	Panevėžys
Поречский уезд	Smolensk Governorate	
Пошехонский уезд	Yaroslavl Governorate	
Пржевальский уезд	Semirechye Oblast	Karakol
Проскуровский уезд	Podolia Governorate	Khmelnytskyi
Пудожский уезд	Olonets Governorate	Pudozh
Пустозёрский уезд	Archangelgorod Governorate	Pustozyorsk
Путивльский уезд	Sevsk Province; Belgorod Governorate; Kursk Governorate	Putyvl
Пятигорский уезд	Terek Oblast	Pyatigorsk
Радинский уезд	Siedlce Governorate	Radzyń Podlaski
Радомский уезд	Radom Governorate	Radom
Раненбургский уезд	Ryazan Governorate	
Рачинский уезд	Kutaisi Governorate	
Ржевский уезд	Tver Governorate	
Ровенский уезд	Wołyń Voivodeship; Volhynian Governorate; Rivne Oblast	Rivne
Рождественский уезд		
Роменский уезд	Poltava Governorate	
Рославльский уезд	Smolensk Governorate	Roslavl
Россошанский уезд	Voronezh Governorate	Rossosh
Ростовский уезд	Yaroslavl Governorate; Yaroslavl Viceroyalty	
Рузаевский уезд	Penza Governorate	Ruzayevka
Рузский уезд		
Рыбинский уезд	Yaroslavl Governorate; Rybinsk Governorate	Rybinsk
Рыльский уезд	Kursk Governorate	Rylsk
Ряжский уезд	Ryazan Governorate	
Рязанский уезд	Ryazan Governorate	
Салмисский уезд	Vyborg Governorate of the Russian Empire	Salmi
Самарский уезд	Samara Governorate; Simbirsk Governorate	Samara
Сапожковский уезд	Ryazan Governorate	
Саранский уезд	Penza Governorate	Saransk
Сарапульский уезд	Vyatka Viceroyalty; Vyatka Governorate; Perm Governorate	Sarapul
Саратовский уезд	Saratov Governorate	Saratov
Сасовский уезд		
Свенцянский уезд	Vilna Governorate	Švenčionys
Свободненский уезд		Svobodny
Севский уезд	Bryansk Governorate	Sevsk
Сейнский уезд	Suwałki Governorate	Sejny
Селенгинский уезд	Transbaikal Oblast	
Семёновский уезд	Nizhny Novgorod Governorate	
Серадзский уезд	Kalisz Governorate	Sieradz
Сергачский уезд	Nizhny Novgorod Governorate	
Сердобский уезд	Saratov Governorate	Serdobsk
Серпейский уезд	Grand Duchy of Moscow; Tsardom of Russia; Smolensk Voivodeship; Smolensk Governorate; Moscow Governorate; Kaluga Province; Kaluga Viceroyalty; Kaluga Governorate	Serpeysk
Скопинский уезд	Ryazan Governorate	Skopin
Славяносербский уезд	Yekaterinoslav Governorate; Donetsian Governorate	
Слободской уезд	Kazan Governorate; Vyatka Viceroyalty; Vyatka Governorate	
Слупецкий уезд	Kalisz Governorate	
Сокольский уезд	Grodno Governorate	
Солигаличский уезд	Kostroma Governorate	
Сольвычегодский уезд	Vologda Governorate	Solvychegodsk
Сосницкий уезд	Chernigov Governorate	Sosnytsia
Спас-Клепиковский уезд	Ryazan Governorate	
Спасский уезд	Tambov Governorate; Penza Governorate	Spassk
Спасский уезд	Kazan Governorate	Bolgar
Спасский уезд	Ryazan Governorate	
Ставропольский уезд	Stavropol Governorate	
Старицкий уезд	Tver Governorate; Tver Viceroyalty	
Starobelsk uezd	Kharkov Governorate	Starobilsk
Староконстантиновский уезд	Volhynian Governorate; Volhynian Viceroyalty	Starokostiantyniv
Старооскольский уезд	Kursk Governorate	Stary Oskol
Старорусский уезд	Novgorod Governorate	Staraya Russa
Стерлитамакский уезд		
Сувалкский уезд		
Суджанский уезд	Kursk Governorate	Sudzha
Судогодский уезд	Vladimir Governorate	Sudogda
Суздальский уезд	Vladimir Governorate; Vladimir Viceroyalty	Suzdal
Sumy uezd	Kharkov Governorate	Sumy
Сунженский отдел		
Суражский уезд	Gomel Governorate; Chernigov Governorate; Novgorod-Seversk Viceroyalty	Surazh
Сургутский уезд		
Сухиничский уезд	Kaluga Governorate	Sukhinichi
Сызранский уезд	Simbirsk Governorate	Syzran
Сычёвский уезд	Smolensk Governorate	Sychyovka
Тамбовский уезд	Tambov Governorate	
Тарский уезд	Omsk Governorate; Aqmola Oblast; Tobolsk Governorate	Tara
Татарский уезд		
Ташкентский уезд		
Тверской уезд	Tver Governorate; Tver Viceroyalty; Tver Province; Saint Petersburg Governorate; Ingermanland Governorate; Tsardom of Russia	Tver
Тедженский уезд	Transcaspian Oblast; Turkmenskaya Oblast; Turkmen Soviet Socialist Republic	Tejen
Темирский уезд	Ural Oblast	Temir
Темниковский уезд	Tambov Governorate; Penza Governorate	Temnikov
Тетюшский уезд	Kazan Governorate; Kazan vicegerency	
Тимский уезд	Kursk Governorate	Tim
Тихвинский уезд	Novgorod Governorate; Cherepovets Governorate	Tikhvin
Тобольский уезд	Tobolsk Governorate	
Тоқмақ уезі	Semirechye Oblast; Kara-Kirghiz Autonomous Oblast; Kirgizkaya Autonomous Oblast; Kirghiz Autonomous Socialist Soviet Republic	Bishkek; Tokmok
Томский уезд	Tomsk Governorate	Tomsk
Торғай уезі		
Торопецкий уезд	Pskov Governorate; Pskov Viceroyalty; Saint Petersburg Governorate; Ingermanland Governorate	
Тотемский уезд	Vologda Governorate	Totma
Троицкосавский уезд		
Трубчевский уезд	Bryansk Governorate; Oryol Governorate; Oryol Viceroyalty	Trubchevsk
Тульский уезд	Tula Governorate; Tula Viceroyalty	Tula
Турекский уезд	Kalisz Governorate	
Туринский уезд	Tyumen Governorate; Tobolsk Governorate	Turinsk
Тюкалинский уезд		
Удский округ	Yakutsk Oblast; Primorskaya Oblast; Sakhalin Oblast	
Унженский уезд	Archangelgorod Governorate	
Уржумский уезд	Vyatka Governorate	Urzhum
Усманский уезд	Tambov Governorate; Voronezh Governorate	Usman
Усть-Медведицкий округ	Don Host Oblast; Don Oblast; Tsaritsyn Governorate; Lower Volga Krai	Serafimovich
Устюженский уезд	Cherepovets Governorate; Novgorod Governorate	
Фатежский уезд	Kursk Governorate	Fatezh
Хасавюртовский округ	Terek Oblast	Khasavyurt
Холмогорский уезд	Arkhangelsk Governorate	Kholmogory; Yemetsk
Холмский уезд	Pskov Governorate; Pskov Viceroyalty	Kholm
Хотмыжский уезд	Kursk Governorate; Kharkov Viceroyalty; Sloboda Ukraine Governorate; Belgorod Governorate; Belgorod Province	
Царевококшайский уезд	Kazan Governorate	Yoshkar-Ola
Царёвский уезд	Astrakhan Governorate; Saratov Governorate; Tsaritsyn Governorate	Tsarev; Leninsk
Царицынский уезд	Tsaritsyn Governorate; Saratov Governorate; Penza Governorate	Volgograd
Цивильский уезд	Kazan Governorate; Chuvash Autonomous Oblast; Chuvash Autonomous Soviet Socialist Republic	
Цикмӓ уезд	Kazan Governorate; Kazan vicegerency	Kozmodemyansk
Чебоксарский уезд	Kazan Governorate; Chuvash Autonomous Oblast; Chuvash Autonomous Soviet Socialist Republic	
Чембарский уезд	Penza Governorate	Belinsky
Ченстоховский уезд	Masovia Governorate; Warsaw Governorate; Piotrków Governorate	
Черноярский уезд	Astrakhan Governorate; Penza Governorate; Saratov Governorate; Tsaritsyn Governorate; Kalmyk Autonomous Oblast	Chorny Yar
Чернский уезд	Tula Governorate; Tula Viceroyalty	Tchern
Чистопольский уезд	Kazan Governorate	Chistopol
Читинский уезд	Transbaikal Oblast	
Шадринский уезд	Perm Viceroyalty; Perm Governorate; Yekaterinburg Governorate	Shadrinsk
Шацкий уезд	Ryazan Governorate; Tambov Governorate	Shatsk
Шемахинский уезд	Baku Governorate; Azerbaijan Soviet Socialist Republic	Şamaxı
Шенкурский уезд	Arkhangelsk Governorate; Vologda Viceroyalty; Arkhangelsk Viceroyalty	Shenkursk
Шорапанский уезд	Kutaisi Governorate	Zestaponi
Шуйский уезд	Vladimir Governorate	Shuya
Щигровский уезд	Kursk Governorate	Shchigry
Эуряпясский уезд	Viipuri Province	
Юрьевецкий уезд	Kostroma Governorate; Ivanovo-Voznesensk Governorate; Kostroma Viceroyalty; Nizhny Novgorod Governorate; Nizhny Novgorod Province	Yuryevets
