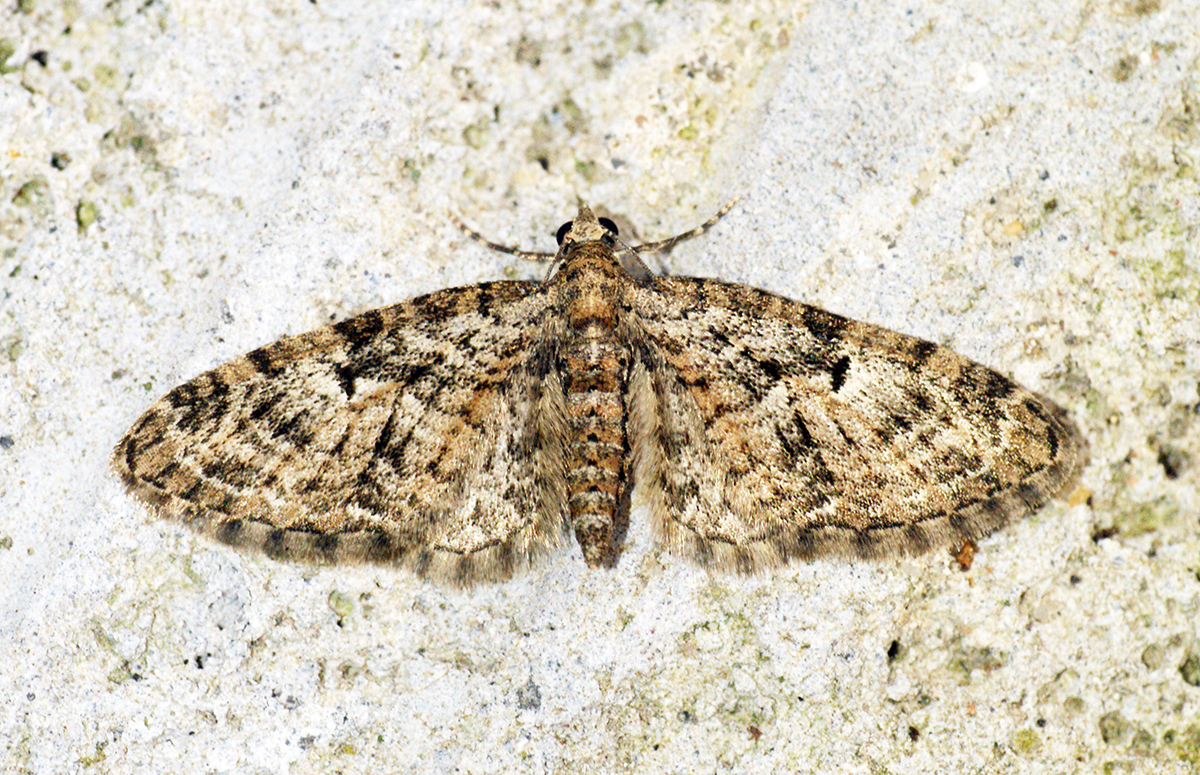

Scientific classification
- Kingdom: Animalia
- Phylum: Arthropoda
- Clade: Pancrustacea
- Class: Insecta
- Order: Lepidoptera
- Family: Geometridae
- Genus: Eupithecia
- Species: E. dodoneata

Binomial name
- Eupithecia dodoneata Guenée, 1857

Synonyms
- Eupithecia quercifoliata Bang-Haas, 1874; Eupithecia andrea Weisert, 2005

= Eupithecia dodoneata =

Species of moth

Eupithecia dodoneata, the oak-tree pug, is a moth of the family Geometridae. The species can be found in Europe into West Russia and including the Central Black Earth Region Other occurrences are found in Asia Minor, the Caucasus as well as in Morocco. In the Pyrenees and the Alps, it rises to altitudes of 1000 metres. The species prefers dry oak and oak mixed forests.

The wingspan is 19–22 mm. The ground colour of the forewings is usually light grey, sometimes slightly brownish on dusted. There are several dark grey crosslines are wavy and often in pairs. The outer cross line near the front edge with a sharp, inward-pointing V. The midfield is brighter in some specimens and framed by a thin dark band. The black median stain has an oval shape. The hind wings are slightly lighter than the forewings and have also several dark designs and a small black middle spot.

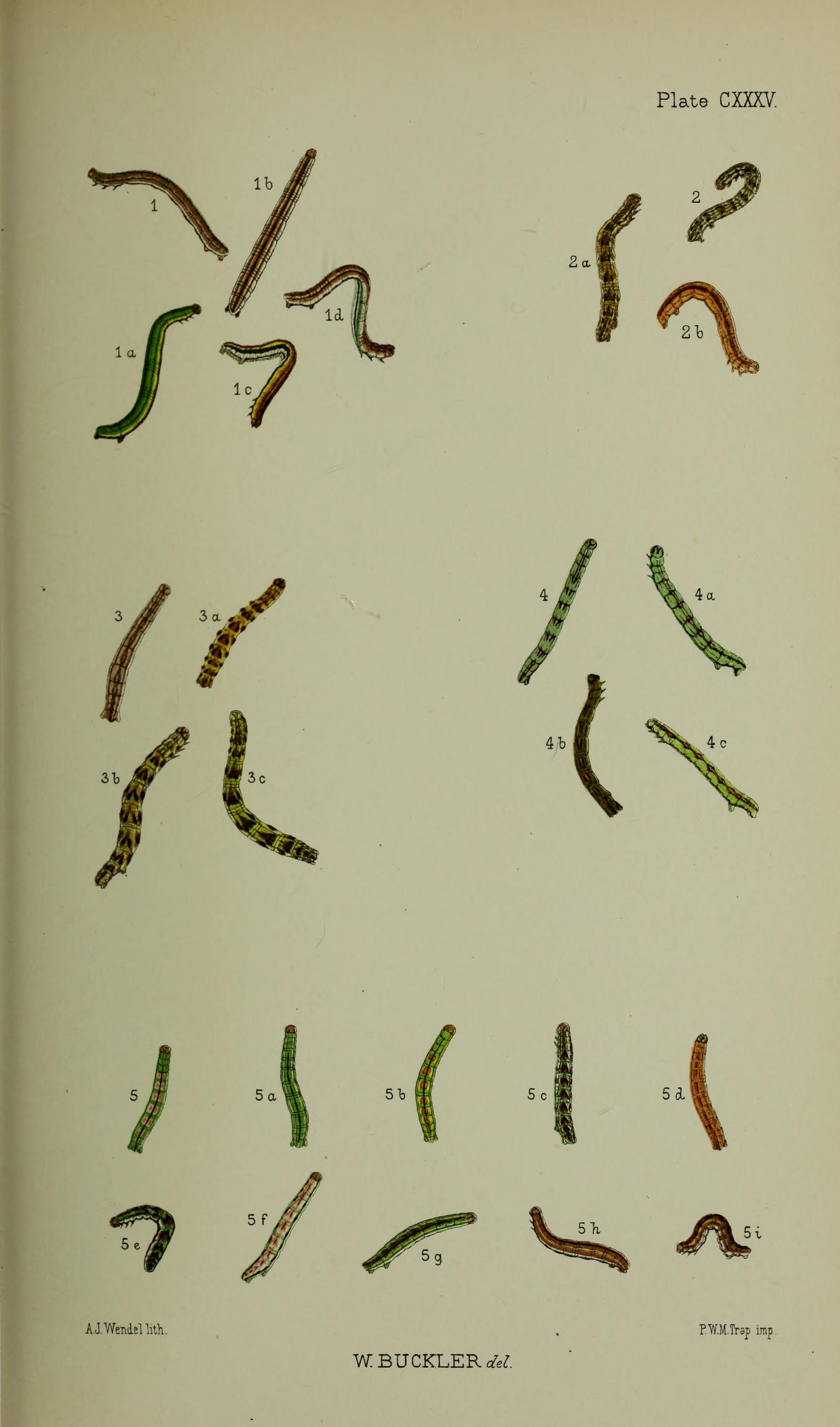
Figs 2, 2a, 2b, larvae in various stages of growth

Adult caterpillars are brownish and show on the back very clear reddish-brown triangular spots, the tip of which is directed forward.

The pupa is coloured black-brown and equipped with two strong and six thin hook bristles on the cremaster.

A reliable determination should be made by specialists, and a genital morphological analysis is also needed for a certain assignment.

The moths flies from May to June depending on the location.

The larvae feed on Crataegus and Quercus species.

== Subspecies ==
- Eupithecia dodoneata dodoneata
- Eupithecia dodoneata austrina Herbulot, 1962

== Similar species ==
- Eupithecia abbreviata
