= Belgorod Governorate =

1727–1779 unit of Russia

Belgorod Governorate Белгородская губерния
- Governorate of the Russian Empire
- 1727–1779
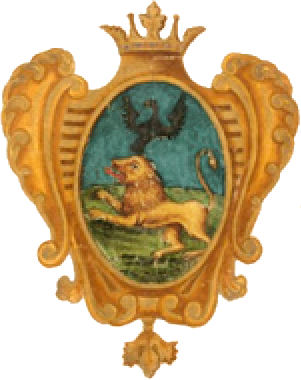
- Coat of arms
- Capital: Belgorod
- Population
  - 1762: 717,265
- History
  - Established: 1727
  - Disestablished: 1779
Preceded by
Kiev Governorate
Succeeded by
Kursk Viceroyalty
Oryol Viceroyalty
Sloboda Ukraine Governorate

Belgorod Governorate (Russian: Белгородская губерния, romanized: Belgorodskaya guberniya) was an administrative-territorial unit (guberniya) of the Russian Empire in 1727–1779 with its capital in Belgorod. In 1775–1779, as a result of the gubernatorial reform of Catherine II, Belgorod Governorate was divided between the newly formed viceroyalties, and Belgorod became the uyezd city of Kursk Governorate.

== History ==
On March 1, 1727, Belgorod Province was separated from Kiev Governorate and became its own governorate. Later in the same year, Oryol and Sevsk Provinces were annexed from Kiev, too.
