= Our Lady Derzhavnaya =

Venerated Russian Orthodox icon

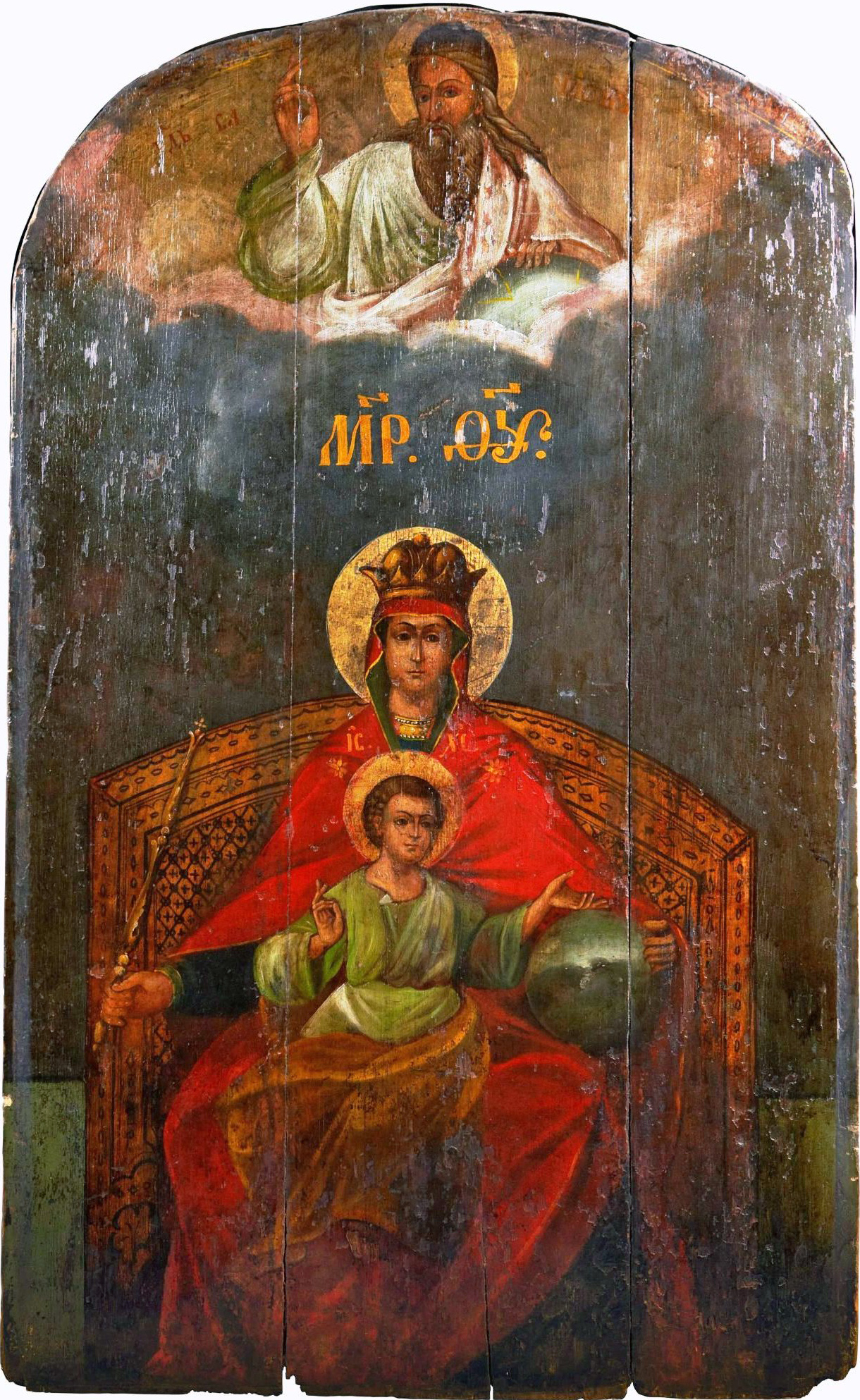
The original icon of Our Lady Derzhavnaya

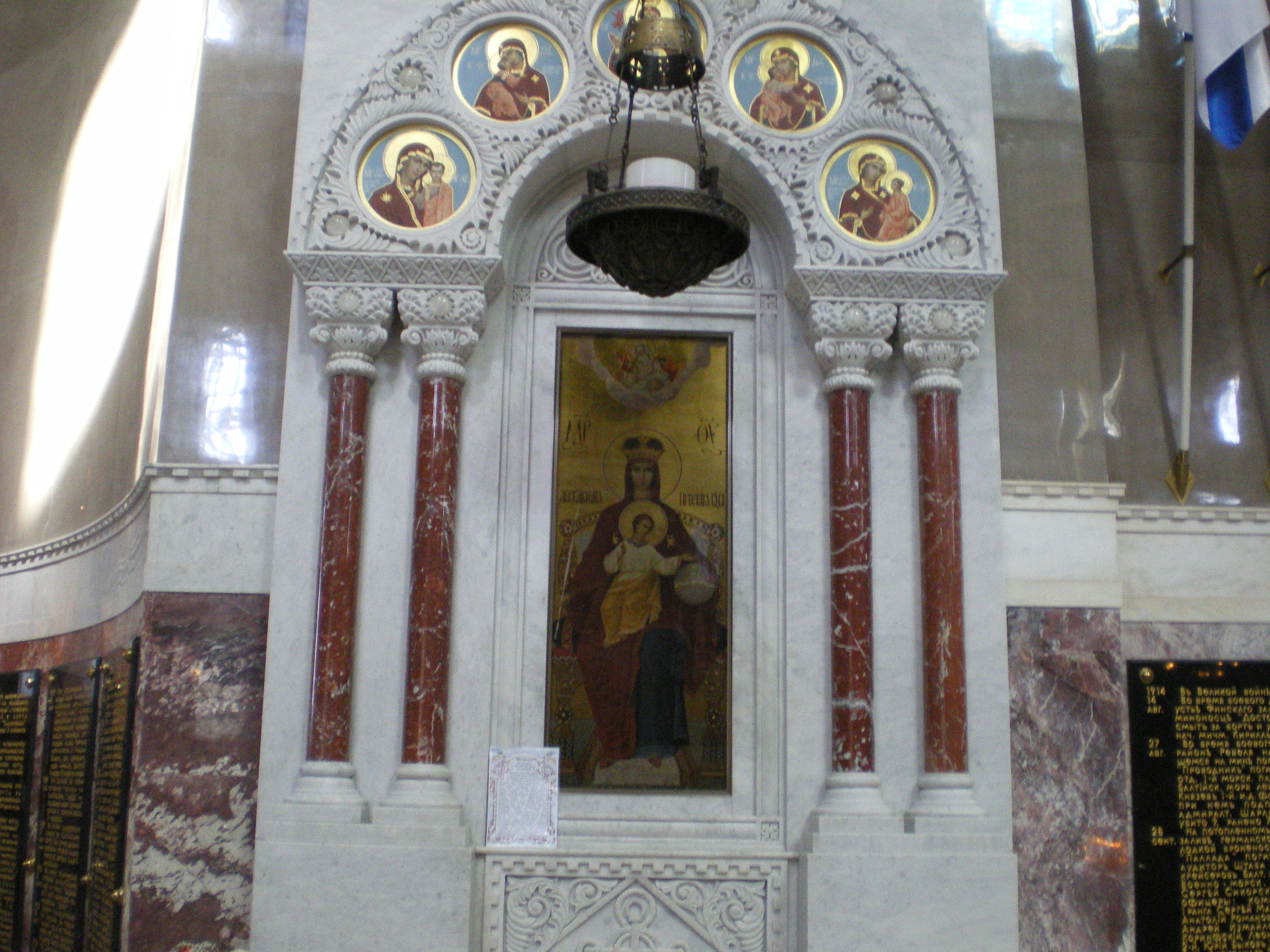
Replica of the icon at Kronstadt Naval Cathedral

Our Lady Derzhavnaya ("The Sovereign", "The Reigning Icon") is a Russian icon believed to date from the 18th century. According to Irina Yazykova, the Reigning Icon, "remains one of the most revered both inside Russia and in Russian emigre circles. Copies of the Reigning Icon of the Mother of God can now be found all over the world." The icon’s feast day is every 2 March.

== Origins ==
The icon was originally venerated in the Ascension Convent, in the Chertolye neighborhood near the Moscow Kremlin. In 1812, as Napoleon Bonaparte's Grande Armée approached Moscow during the French invasion of Russia, the icon was taken to the village church of Kolomenskoye for safekeeping and subsequently forgotten until 1917.

== Reappearance ==
At the end of the "February Revolution" of 1917 (February in the Old Russian Calendar), on 2 March (Julian Calendar)/15 March (Gregorian Calendar) 1917, Tsar Nicholas II of Russia abdicated the throne after riots in Petrograd spiralled out of control. That same day, Evdokia Adrianova, a peasant woman in the village of Pererva in Moscow Province, dreamed the Blessed Virgin appeared and spoke to her. She was instructed to travel to the village of Kolomenskoye, where she would find an old icon which, "will change color from black to red."

Upon her arrival, the parish priest took Evdokia at her word, and together they searched until they found within an old storage room, an icon of the Mother of God, covered in candle soot. As they took the icon outdoors, the sunlight revealed the Virgin was wearing the scarlet robes of a monarch. She also wore the Imperial crown and held a sceptre and globus cruciger — the symbols of regal authority.

== Interpretation ==
According to Irina Yazykova, "Since all this took place on the same day as the Emperor's abdication from the throne, the appearance of the icon was immediately thought to be connected with that event. What is more, the priest was given to understand that the Crown that had fallen from the head of the Tsar had been taken up by the Theotokos, the Mother of God: henceforth, She would be the reigning Tsarina of the Russian State. Thus the icon was named the 'Reigning' icon and became widely revered among the Russian people"

Russian monarchists similarly believe the reappearance of the icon was a sign of the Virgin’s displeasure with Russia for deposing Tsar Nicholas II in the February Revolution. They consider her as holding the Imperial Crown for safekeeping until the House of Romanov is restored.

In 2003 and 2014, the Reigning Icon, with the Theotokos of Port Arthur icon, were brought for veneration to the Portuguese city of Fátima. There, according to seer Lúcia dos Santos, Our Lady of Fátima prophesied on 13 July 1917 how post-revolution Russia would "spread her errors throughout the world, causing wars and persecutions of the Church."

== See also ==
- Consecration of Russia
- Coronation of the Russian monarch
- Monarchist Party
- Theotokos of Port Arthur
