= Konstanty Jelski =

Polish ornithologist and zoologist (1837–1896)

- Канстанцін Ельскі
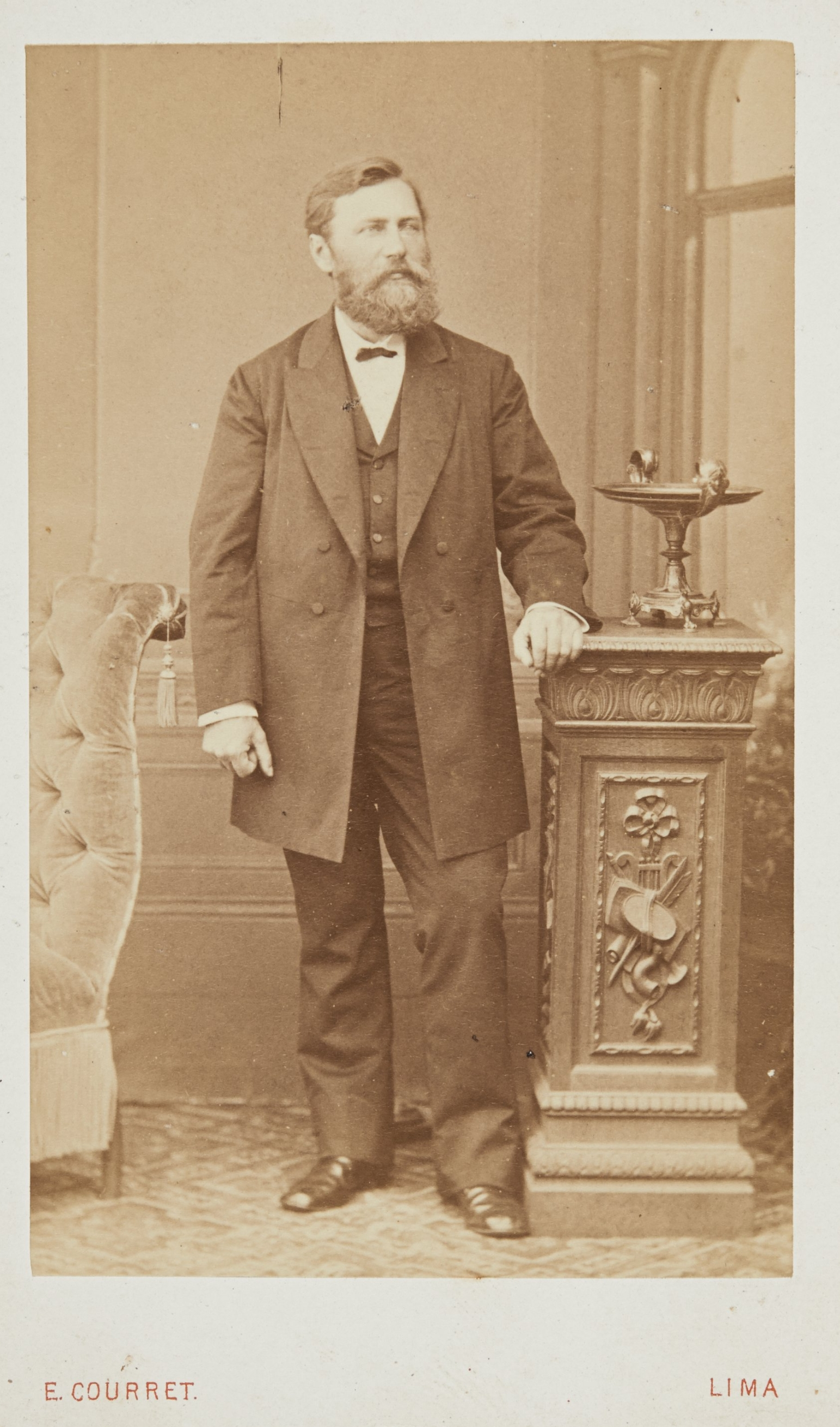
- Born: Konstanty Roman Jelski; February 17, 1837; Liady, Igumensky Uyezd, Minsk Governorate, Russian Empire
- Died: November 26, 1896 (aged 59); Kraków, Kingdom of Galicia and Lodomeria, Austria-Hungary
- Occupations: ornithologist, zoologist
- Known for: exploring French Guiana

Konstanty Roman Jelski (Belarusian: Канстанці́н Міха́йлавіч Е́льскі; Russian: Константи́н Миха́йлович Е́льский; February 17, 1837 – November 26, 1896) was an acclaimed Polish ornithologist and zoologist who explored French Guiana.

Jeski was born in Liady village (now in Smalyavichy district) of the Igumensky Uyezd of Minsk Governorate (now in Belarus), to Michał and Klotilda. He was educated at Minsk and then went to study medicine in Moscow and the natural sciences at Kiev University. He graduated in 1860. He studied the anatomy of the mollusc Lithoglyphus naticoides to obtain a master's degree. In between studies he accompanied Karol Kessler on an expedition into Crimea. The January Uprising led to Jeski leaving Russia to Turkey. Here he received help from Rustem Bey (of Polish descent) and took part in a government effort to explore geological resources. He found that all they wanted were superficial reports and he then moved to France and came in contact with the natural history specimen traders Maison Verreaux and Deyrolle. While in France he received assistance from his friends Adrian Baraniecki (1828–1891) and Józef Sowiński. He made a trip to French Guiana and then worked as an apothecary assistant. In 1868 he went to collect natural history specimens in Peru for Władysław Taczanowski and received some support from Count Branicki. He explored French Guiana and Peru until 1875. Jan Sztolcman (1854–1928) also travelled in Peru with him. Although mainly interested in zoology, he also examined plants and ecology. He noted the importance of old dead trees in the forest and noted how rapidly the forest recovered taking over abandoned plantations. Unable to pay for food, he often depended on fruit from such abandoned plantations during his travels. He worked as a curator of the museum of Antonio Raimondi (1824–1890) in Lima from 1873 to 1878, and returned to Poland in 1880 becoming a curator of the Natural History department of Academy of Learning in Kraków.

Jelski married Helena née Korsak in 1883 and they had four children, two died young while a son and daughter were killed by the Soviets in 1939. Jelski died at Kraków and is buried at the Rakowicki Cemetery.
