= Novogrudsky Uyezd =

Novogrudsky Uyezd (Russian: Новогрудский уезд) was one of the uyezds of Minsk Governorate and the Governorate-General of Minsk of the Russian Empire and then of Byelorussian Soviet Socialist Republic with its seat in Novogrudok. It was established 1793 and in 1924 abolished by Soviet authorities.

== History ==
From 1796 to 1801 it was part of Lithuania Governorate and from 1801 to 1843 of Grodno Governorate.

== Demographics ==
At the time of the Russian Empire Census of 1897, Novogrudsky Uyezd had a population of 247,320. Of these, 83.7% spoke Belarusian, 12.3% Yiddish, 1.7% Polish, 1.6% Russian, 0.4% Tatar, 0.2% Ukrainian and 0.1% German as their native language.
