= Korochansky Uyezd =

Subdivision of Kursk Governorate, Russian Empire

Korochansky Uyezd Корочанский уезд
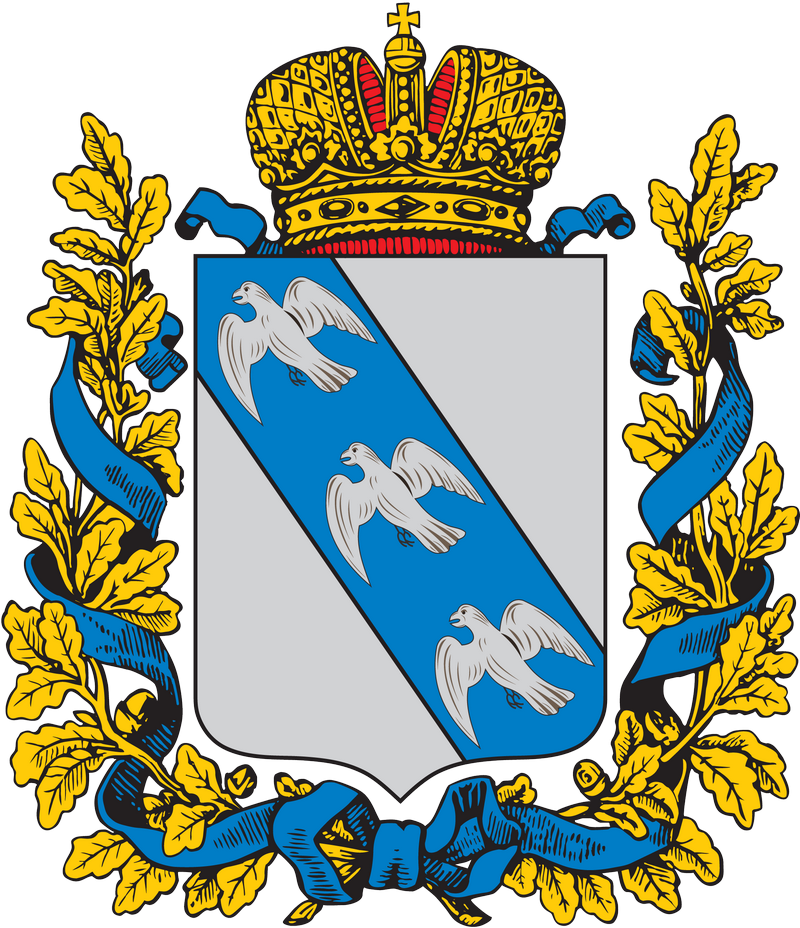
- Coat of arms

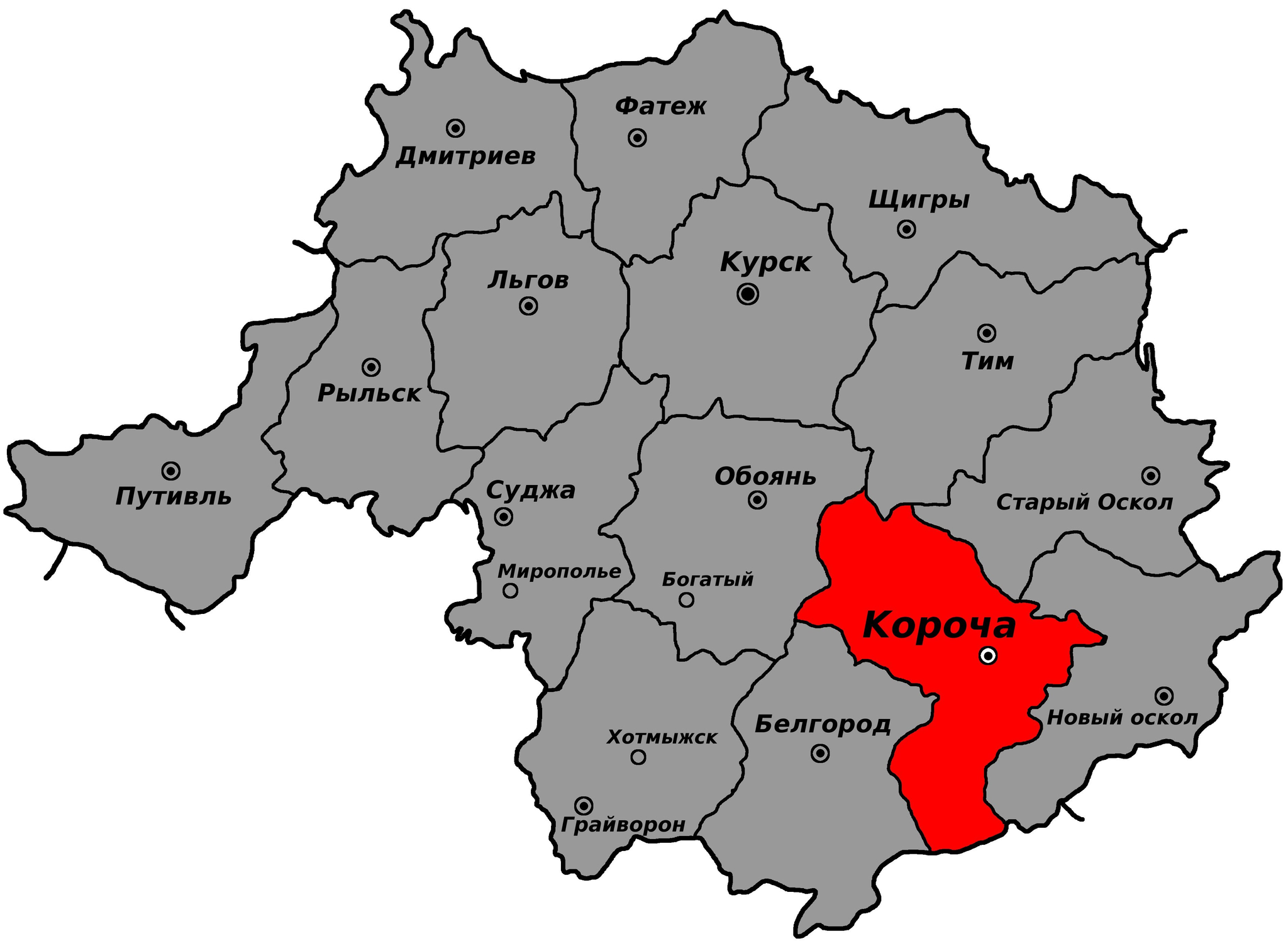
- Country: Russia
- Political status: Uyezd
- Region: Kursk Governorate
- Abolished: 1924

Area
  - Total: 3,198 km^{2} (1,235 sq mi)

Population (1897)
  - Total: 157,849
  - Density: 49.36/km^{2} (127.8/sq mi)

Korochansky Uyezd (Russian: Корочанский уезд, romanized: Korochanskiy uyezd; Ukrainian: Корочанський повіт, romanized: Korochanskyi povit) was one of the uyezds (administrative units) of Kursk Governorate of the Russian Empire and then of the Russian Soviet Federative Socialist Republic with its center in Korocha until its formal abolition in 1924 by Soviet authorities.

== History ==
Korochansky County became an administrative unit in the mid-1600s. Korochansky county was part of the nearby settlements of the Belgorod defensive line. Korochansky county was formally abolished as an administrative unit in 1708 during the regional reforms of Peter the Great. Korocha became part of Kiev Governorate. In 1719, the province was divided, and became part of the Belgorod Governorate of Kiev Governorate. In 1727, Beglrod province, consisting of Belgorod, Orel and Sevsk provinces was allocated. Korochansky county was restored as part of the Belgorod Province. In 1779, as a result of the reforms of Catherine the Great, the Belgorod Province was abolished. Korochansky Uyezd's boundaries were revised and it became part of Kursk Governorship. In 1796, Kursk Governorship became the Kursk Governorate. Part of the territory in Stary Oskol Uyezd became part of Korochansky Uyezd, but parts of Korochansky Uyezd became part of Novoskolsky Uyezd. In 1802, the borders were again revised. In 1918, parts of the uyezd were occupied by German troops. On 12 May 1924, the county was officially abolished and it became part of the Belgorod Uyezd.

In 1928, the Korochansky District was created on the territory of the Uyezd and became part of the Central Black Earth Oblast.

== Demographics ==
At the time of the Russian Empire Census of 1897, Korochansky Uyezd had a population of 159,024. Of these, 65.3% spoke Russian, 34.3% Ukrainian, 0.3% Belarusian and 0.1% Yiddish as their native language.
