= Vasily Vladimirovich Petrov =

- Василий Владимирович Петров
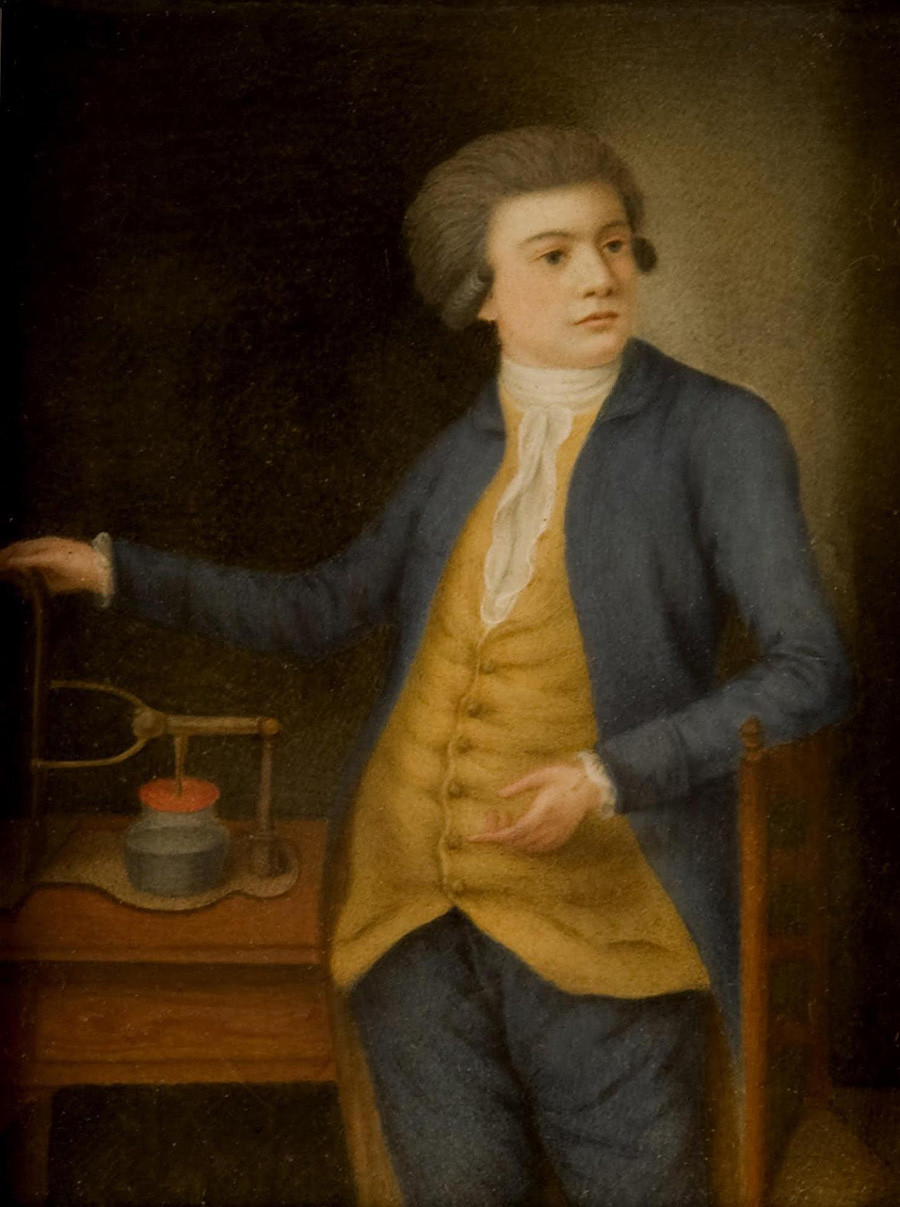
- Born: July 19 [O.S. July 8], 1761; Oboyan, Belgorod Province, Russian Empire
- Died: August 15, 1834 (aged 73); Saint Petersburg, Russian Empire
- Occupation(s): Physicist, electrical technician, academician

Vasily Vladimirovich Petrov (Russian: Василий Владимирович Петров; 19 July [O.S. 8 July] 1761 – 15 August 1834) was a Russian experimental physicist, self-taught electrical technician, academician of Russian Academy of Sciences (since 1809; Corresponding member since 1802).

Vasily Petrov was born in the town of Oboyan, Belgorod Province, Russian Empire, in the family of a priest. He studied at a public school in Kharkov, and then at the St. Petersburg Teacher's College.

In 1788, he gained a position as mathematics and physics teacher at Kolyvansko-Voskresenskoe College of Mining, in the town of Barnaul. In 1791, he was transferred to Saint Petersburg to teach mathematics and Russian at the military Engineering College, in the Izmailovsky regiment. In 1793, Petrov was invited to teach mathematics and physics at the St. Petersburg Medical and Surgery School, at the military hospital. In 1795, he was promoted to the rank of 'Extraordinary Professor'. During the next few years, he built up a comprehensive physics laboratory.

His first published book, "A collection of new physical-chemical experiments and observations" (Russian: Собрание физико-химических новых опытов и наблюдений), was published in 1801. The bulk of this work was dedicated to the description of experiments related to combustion, as evidence against the then-popular phlogiston theory.

The chapters, describing luminosity of phosphors of mineral and organic origins have elicited vivid interest in scientific circles. Petrov was able to detect the maximum temperature when phosphorus ceases to glow in open (atmospheric) air, by his numerous experiments with fluorite he was able to prove it glows due to a different reason than phosphorus.

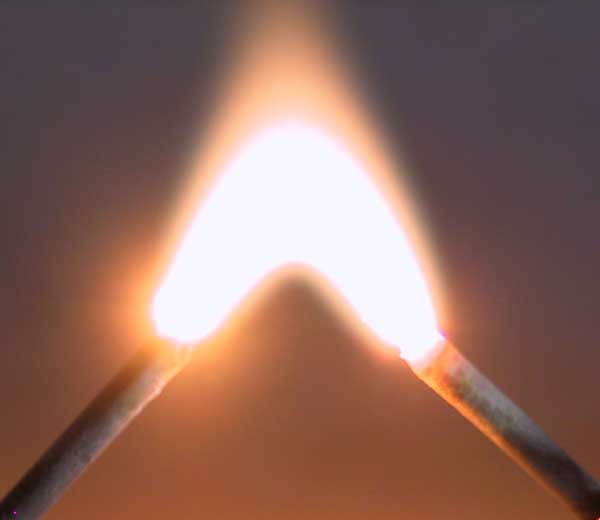
An electric arc.

In 1802, Petrov discovered the electric arc effect, thanks to his building the world's largest and most powerful Voltaic pile at the time, which consisted of around 4,200 copper and zinc discs. In "News of Galvanic-Voltaic Experiments", 1803 (Russian: Izvestie o galvani-voltovskikh opytakh), Petrov described experiments performed using the voltaic pile, detailing the stable arc discharge and the indication of its possible use in artificial lighting, melting metals for smelting and welding, obtaining pure metallic oxides, and reduction of metals from oxides mixed with powdered carbon and oils.

Petrov was forgotten soon after his death and his works fell into oblivion. A copy of "News of Galvanic-Voltaic Experiments" was discovered by chance in a library in the town of Vilna near the end of the 19th century. The book was the first time in world literature that a series of important physical phenomena related to electricity were described in detail.

It was not until the late 1880s that technology based on Petrov's experiments was developed with the goal of industrial usage.
