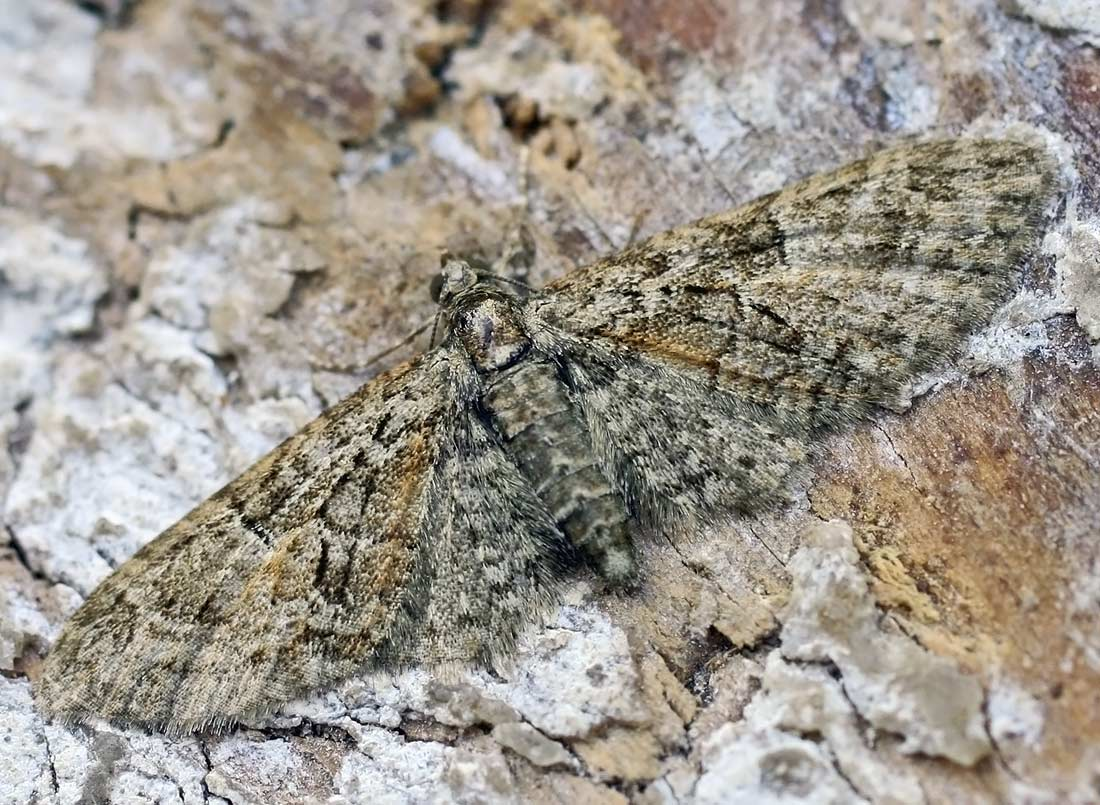

Scientific classification
- Domain: Eukaryota
- Kingdom: Animalia
- Phylum: Arthropoda
- Class: Insecta
- Order: Lepidoptera
- Family: Geometridae
- Genus: Eupithecia
- Species: E. abbreviata

Binomial name
- Eupithecia abbreviata Stephens, 1831

Synonyms
- Phalaena nebulata Haworth, 1809; Eupithecia subfasciata Stephens, 1831

= Brindled pug =

Species of moth

The brindled pug (Eupithecia abbreviata) is a moth of the family Geometridae found in Europe including the British Isles as well as further east to the Baltic States, Armenia, Turkey and the Caucasus. South it reaches North Africa.

== Description ==
The wingspan is 19–22 mm. The length of the forewings is 10–12 mm. The forewing is elongate, the hindwing is small, with the distal margin almost straight from near the apex to behind middle. The forewing has a decided tinge of ochreous and there are strong dark vein-dashes proximally to postmedian line, those on the median veins especially well developed. Antennal ciliation not very long. — hirschkei Bastelb.[ab.], prevalent in the Middle Rhine district, is more weakly marked.

Adult caterpillars are smooth and slender. They are coloured light grey to yellow-grey and show on the back large dark brown, diamond-like spots. The strongly jagged side stripes are also dark brown.

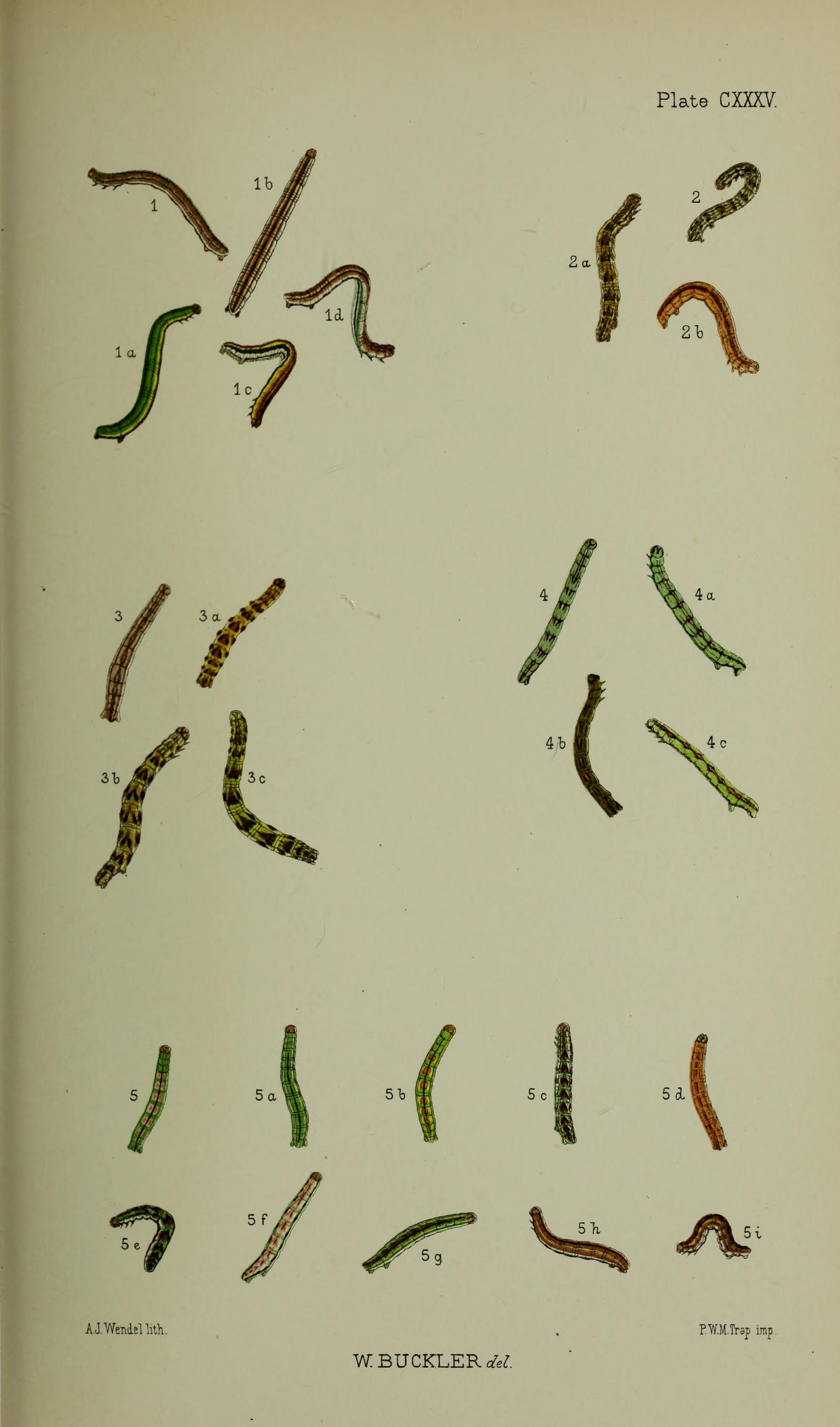
Figs 3,3a,3b,3c larvae in various stages of growth

The adults fly in April and May. The habitat is oak forests, mixed oak forests, oak avenues and parkland. In the Southern Alps, it rises to heights of 1100 metres.

The larvae feed on oak and hawthorn.

== Similar species ==
Eupithecia dodoneata has a more grey-tone appearance and the marks are clearly set off. A safe determination is usually only possible by means of a genital morphological examination.
