= Kazan Province =

Province of Kazan Governorate of the Russian Empire

The Kazan Province (Russian: Каза́нская прови́нция) was a province of Kazan Governorate of the Russian Empire, which existed 1719–1775. Its center was the city of Kazan.

Kazan province was formed as part of the Kazan gubernya by decree of Peter the Great in 1719. The cities of Kazan and Urzhum were included in the province.

In November 1775, the division of gubernyas into provinces was abolished.
