= Theotokos of Port Arthur =

Eastern Orthodox icon

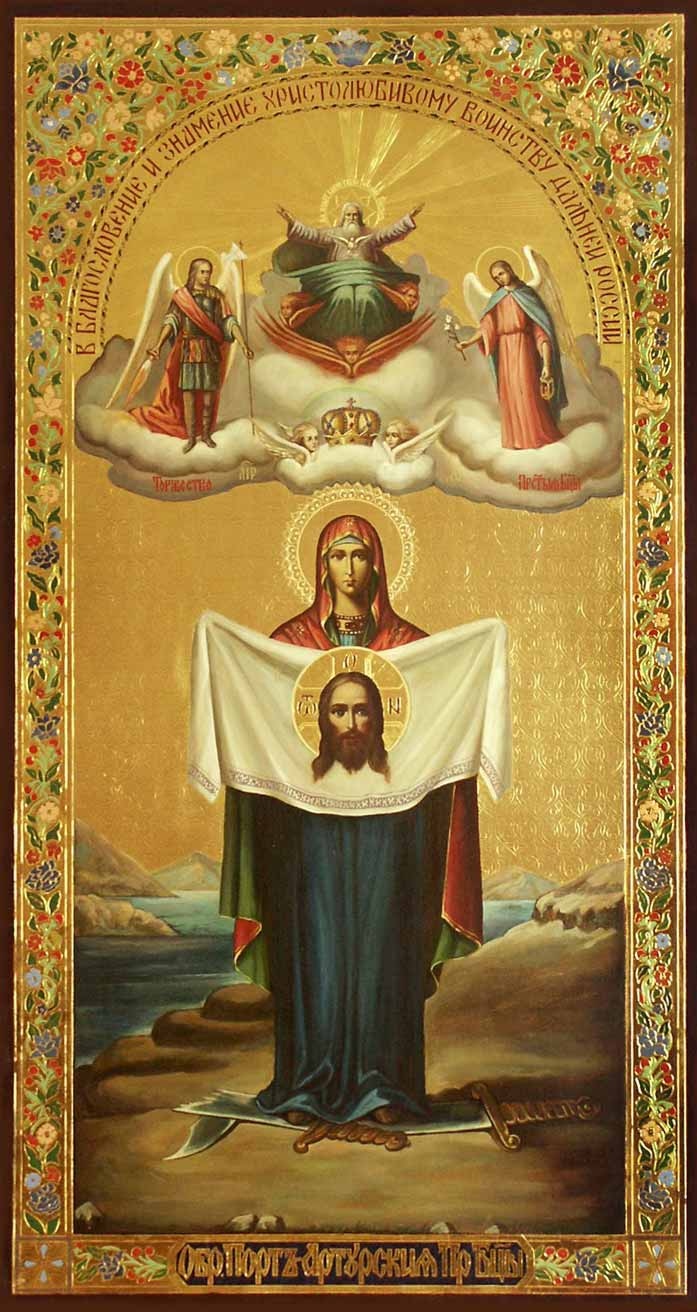
Theotokos of Port Arthur.

Theotokos of Port Arthur (Our Lady of Port Arthur, also known in Russian as Theotokos upon Swords and the Far Eastern Gatekeeper) is an Eastern Orthodox icon, representing the Theotokos (Virgin Mary) with the Mandylion and God the Father, flanked by two angels. The icon's dimensions (without frame) are approximately 124×77 cm. The icon is associated with the vision of an old veteran sailor, who came to pray in the Kiev Pechersk Lavra on December 11, 1903. In his dream, the sailor reportedly saw the Virgin Mary, who warned him about the upcoming Russo-Japanese War. Mary instructed to make an exact depiction of the vision and deliver it to Port Arthur (now Lüshunkou District) so that the Russians would gain her patronage and protection in the war.

Following the onset of the Russo-Japanese War, the devotees donated money for materials needed for making the icon. The image itself was painted free of charge by icon painter Pavel Shtronda in 1904 according to the sailor's vision. The icon, however, was not delivered to Port Arthur in time and the Siege of Port Arthur, as well as the war in general, ended with Russian defeat (for this reason the icon is also called the Unachieved Victory). Nonetheless the icon continued to be venerated and six copies were made. The icon was considered lost for more than 90 years. In 1998 Christian pilgrims from Vladivostok came to Jerusalem and fortuitously saw the icon in an antique shop. Expert examination confirmed its identity and the icon was bought and brought back to Russia. The original icon can be found now in Vladivostok in Pokrovsky Church (44 Okeansky Ave.). The feast day of the Theotokos of Port Arthur is 29 August (16 August in the Old Style calendar) and 24 December (11 December in the Old Style calendar).

In 2003 and 2014 the icon, together with another significant Theotokos Derzhavnaya icon, were brought to the Portuguese city of Fátima, where the famous Catholic Fátima Marian apparition occurred in 1917.

== See also ==
- Theotokos Derzhavnaya
