= Central Black Earth Region =

Soil region in Russia

Coordinates: 51.9000°N 37.9000°E

Oblasts comprising Central Black Earth Region

The Central Black Earth Region or the Central-Chernozem Region (Note: Russian: Центрально-Чернозёмная полоса, romanized: Centraljno-Černozjomnaja polosa, IPA: [tsɨnˈtralʲnə tɕɪrnɐˈzʲɵmnəjə pəɫɐˈsa]; lit. 'Central-Black Soil Strip') is a segment of the Eurasian Black Earth belt that lies within Central Russia and comprises Voronezh Oblast, Lipetsk Oblast, Belgorod Oblast, Tambov Oblast, Oryol Oblast and Kursk Oblast. Between 1928 and 1934, these regions briefly united as the Central Black Earth Oblast, with the centre in Voronezh.

The Black Earth Region is famous for its high-quality chernozem (Russian for 'black earth') soil. Although its importance has been primarily agricultural, the Soviets developed the Chernozem Region as an industrial region based on the iron ores of the Kursk Magnetic Anomaly.

The area contains a biosphere nature reserve called Central Black Earth Nature Reserve (42 km^{2} (16 sq mi)), which was created in 1935 within the Kursk and Belgorod oblasts. A prime specimen of forest steppe in Europe, the nature reserve consists of typical virgin land (целина, tselina), steppes and deciduous forests.

Juozas Vareikis was the First Secretary of Communist Party's Regional Committee for the Central Black Earth Region (1928–1934).

== History ==
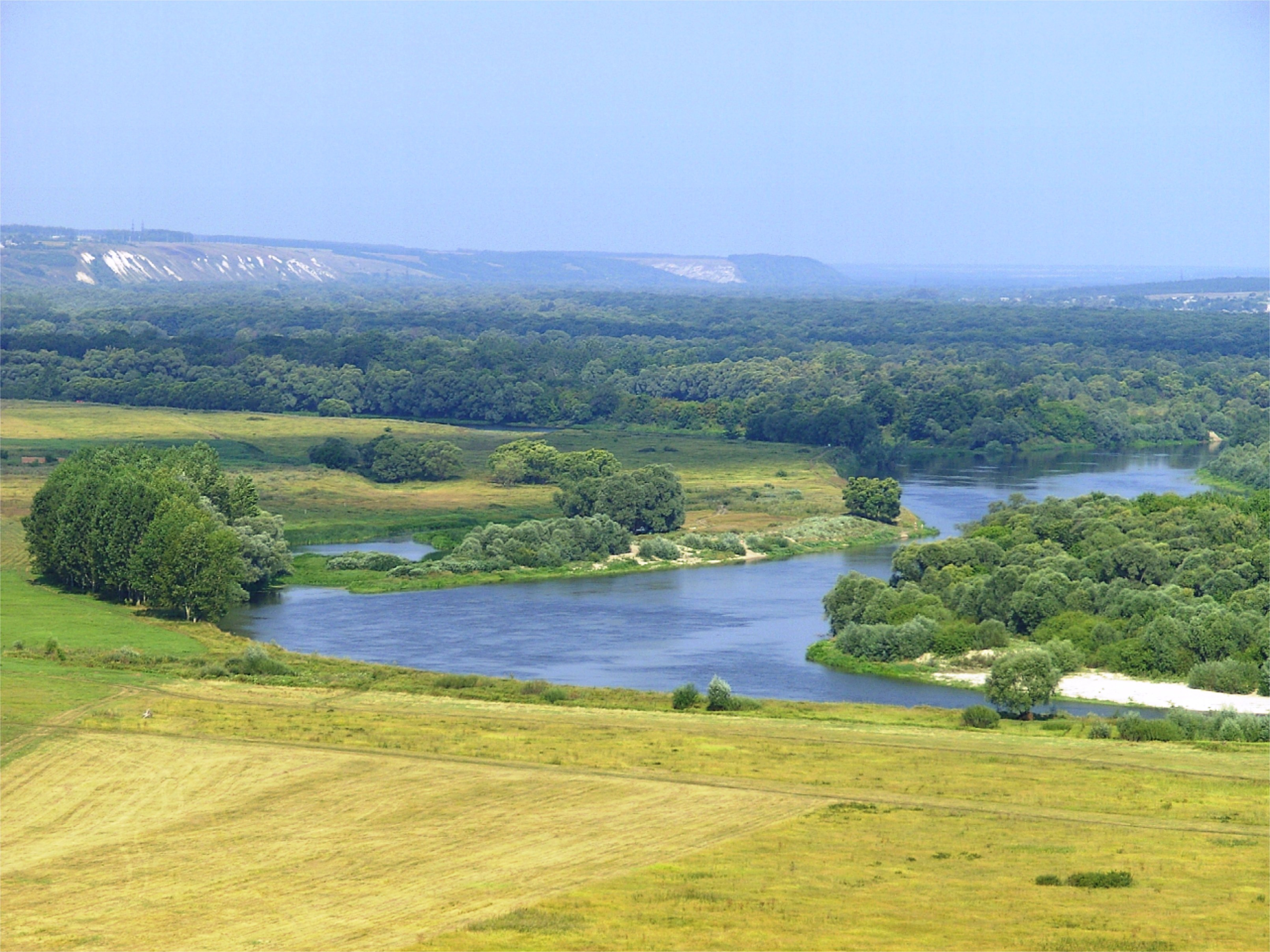
Voronezh oblast. Chernozemie

On 14 May 1928, the All-Russian Central Executive Committee and Government of the Russian Soviet Federative Socialist Republic passed a directive on the formation of the Central Black Earth Oblast using the territory of the former Voronezh, Kursk, Oryol and Tambov Governorate Governorates with its centre as the city of Voronezh.

The composition of the Central Black Earth Oblast was determined on 16 July 1928, and its districts were founded on 30 July of the same year. Later, from 1929 to 1933, these districts were revised several times.

On 3 June 1929, Voronezh, the centre of the region, was designated as an independent administrative unit directly subordinate to the regional Congress of Soviets and its executive committee.

On 16 September 1929, the Voronezh Okrug was abolished, and its territory became the Stary Oskol and Usman Okrugs.

== See also ==
- Central Black Earth Economic Region
- Black Dirt Region
