= Volhynian Viceroyalty =

1792–1796 unit of Russia

Volhynia Viceroyalty Волынская наместничество
- Viceroyalty of the Russian Empire
- 1792–1796
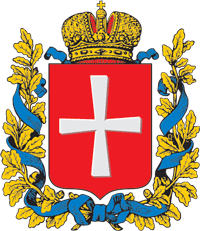
- Coat of arms
- Capital: Novograd-Volynsky; Zhitomir (officially since 1804)
- History
  - 2nd partition of Poland: 1792
  - transformed into a governorate: 1 August 1796
- Political subdivisions: Governorates of Russian Empire
Preceded by	Succeeded by
Wołyń Voivodeship (1569–1795); Izyaslav Viceroyalty	Volhynia Governorate

Volhynia Viceroyalty (Russian: Волынское наместничество, romanized: Volynskoye namestnichestvo) was an administrative-territorial unit (namestnichestvo) of the Russian Empire, created at the end of 1795 after the third Partition of Poland from the territory of the Izyaslav Viceroyalty and Wołyń Voivodeship.

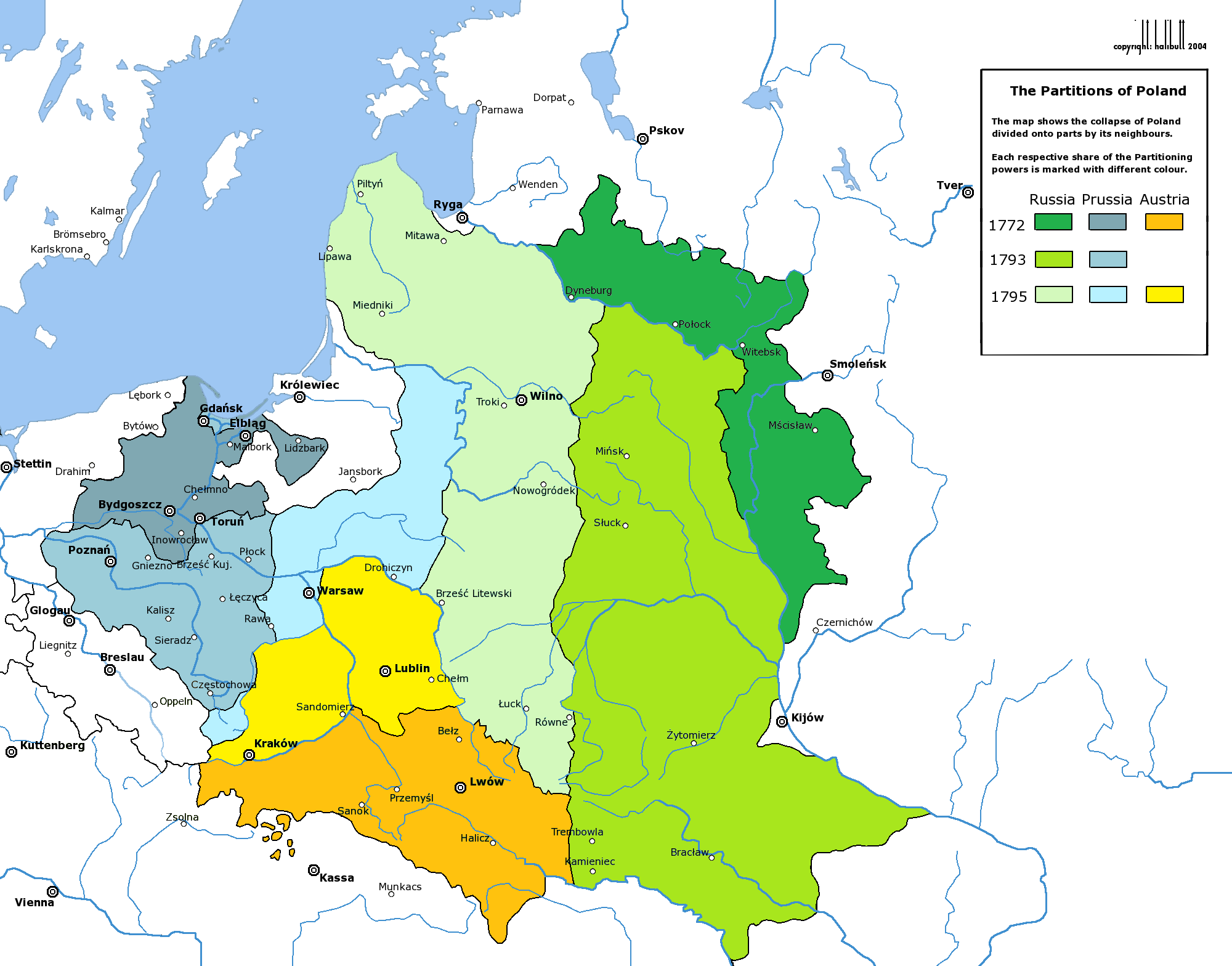
Three partitions of Polish-Lithuanian Commonwealth
