= Igumensky Uyezd =

Uyezd of the Russian Empire (1793-1924)

Igumensky Uyezd (Russian: Игуменский уезд) was one of the uyezds of Minsk Governorate and the Governorate-General of Minsk of the Russian Empire and then of Byelorussian Soviet Socialist Republic with its seat in Igumen from 1793 until its formal abolition in 1924 by Soviet authorities.

== Demographics ==
At the time of the Russian Empire Census of 1897, Igumensky Uyezd had a population of 234,792. Of these, 82.6% spoke Belarusian, 12.3% Yiddish, 2.9% Polish, 1.8% Russian, 0.3% Tatar, 0.1% German and 0.1% Latvian as their native language.
