= Kremenchuk Governorate =

Kremenchuk Governorate Кременчуцька губернія
- Governorate of Ukrainian SSR
- 1920–1922
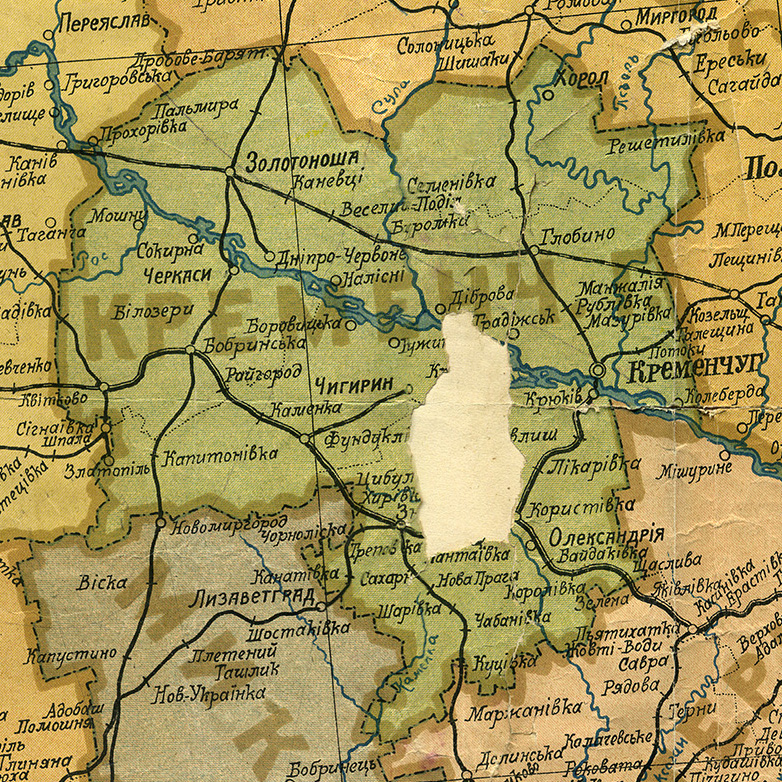
- Map of 1922
- Capital: Kremenchuk
- History
  - Established: 15 August 1920
  - Disestablished: 1922
Preceded by
Poltava Governorate
Kyiv Governorate
Kherson Governorate
Succeeded by
Poltava Governorate
Kyiv Governorate
Katerynoslav Governorate
- Today part of: Ukraine

Kremenchuk Governorate (Ukrainian: Кременчуцька губернія) was a governorate of the Ukrainian SSR (Ukraine) that existed between 1920 and 1922. Its capital was Kremenchuk.

It was established by a decree of the All-Ukrainian Central Executive Committee in July 1920, with effect from 15 August 1920. It was composed of six counties: Cherkasy, Chyhyryn, Khorol, Kremenchuk, Oleksandriia, and Zolotonosha.

It was disbanded by a decree from October 1922. The Khorol, Kremenchuk and Zolotonosha counties were assigned to the Poltava Governorate, the Cherkasy and Chyhyryn counties were assigned to the Kyiv Governorate, and the Oleksandriia county was assigned to the Katerynoslav Governorate.

Main cities were Cherkasy, Chyhyryn, Khorol, Oleksandriia, Zolotonosha, and the provincial capital Kremenchuk.
