= Ural Oblast (Russian Empire) =

Present-day western Kazakhstan

Coordinates: 51.2333°N 51.3667°E

Ural Oblast Уральская область
- Oblast of the Russian Empire
- 1868–1920
- Coat of arms

- Location of Ural Oblast in the Russian Empire
- Capital: Uralsk
- History
  - Established: 1868
  - Disestablished: 12 October 1920
- Today part of: Kazakhstan; Russia; Uzbekistan

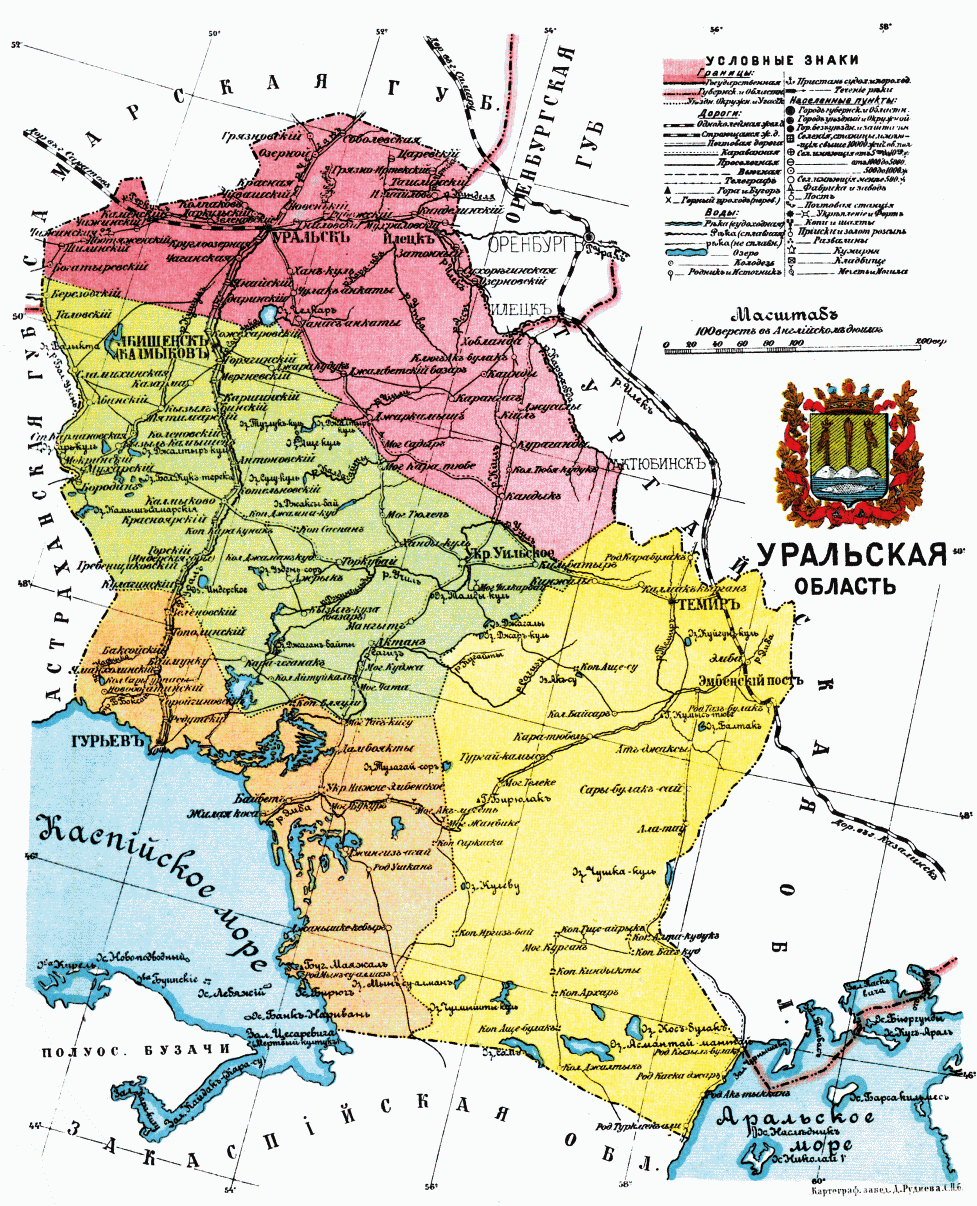
Map of Ural Oblast in 1913

The Ural Oblast (Russian: Уральская область; Eng: Uralskaya Oblast) was an oblast (province) of the Russian Empire. It roughly corresponded to most of present-day western Kazakhstan. It was created out of the territories of the former Kazakh khanate.

== Demographics ==
As of 1897, 684,590 people populated the oblast. Kazakhs constituted the majority of the population. Significant minorities consisted of Russians and Tatars. Total Turkic speaking were 478,695 (74,2%).

== Ethnic groups in 1897 ==
TOTAL	645,121	100%
Kazakhs	460,173	71,3%
Russians	160,894	24,9%
Tatars	17,809	2,8%
