= Moscow Province =

Province of the Russian Empire

The Moscow Province (Russian: Московская провинция) was a province of Moscow Governorate of the Russian Empire, which existed 1719–1775. Its center was the city of Moscow.

Moscow province was formed as part of the Moscow gubernya by decree of Peter the Great in 1719. The cities of Moscow, Borisovo, Borovsk, Vereya, Volokolamsk, Dmitrov, Zvenigorod, Kashira, Klin, Kolomna, Maloyaroslavets, Mozhaysk, Ruza, Serpukhov with Obolensk and Tarusa counties were included in the province.

In November 1775, the division of gubernyas into provinces was abolished.
