= Uezd =

Historic Russian administrative subdivision

Uezds of the Russian Empire in 1897

An uezd (Russian: уезд, romanized: uyezd; pre-1918 spelling: уѣздъ) was a secondary administrative division used in the Grand Duchy of Moscow, the Tsardom of Russia, the Russian Empire, and the early Soviet Union from the 13th century until the late 1920s.

In the Russian Empire, uezds were subdivisions of governorates (guberniyas) and roughly corresponded to counties or districts. Each uezd was further subdivided into rural volosts.

== History ==
Uezds originated in the 13th and 14th centuries as groups of volosts centered around fortified towns. In the Tsardom of Russia, they were administered by princely appointees (namestniki) and later by central-appointed voivodes (Russian: воевода).

In 1708, Peter the Great divided Russia into eight large governorates and abolished uezds. They were restored in 1727 under Catherine I.

In 1775, Catherine the Great reorganized the system so that each uezd had a population of roughly 20,000 to 30,000. Local administration and police were overseen by an elected official, the ispravnik (Russian: исправник), along with noble assemblies.

Between 1923 and 1929, the Soviet government replaced uezds and volosts with oblasts, okrugs, and raions.

== Regional equivalents ==
In non-Russian regions of the empire, local terms were used for uezd-level divisions:

- Baltic governorates: Kreis (German), apriņķis (Latvian), and maakond or kreis (Estonian).
- Bessarabia Governorate: ținut (until 1828) and județ (Romanian).
- Congress Poland: powiat (Polish).
- Grand Duchy of Finland: Härad (Swedish) and kihlakunta (Finnish).
- Lithuanian governorates (Vilna, Kovno, Grodno): Apskritis (Lithuanian).
- Ukrainian lands: povit (Ukrainian: повіт).
- Cossack hosts (such as the Don Host Oblast): okrugs.

== See also ==
- List of uezds of the Russian Empire
- History of the administrative division of Russia
- Governorate (Russia)
