= Lithuania Governorate =

1796–1801 unit of Russia

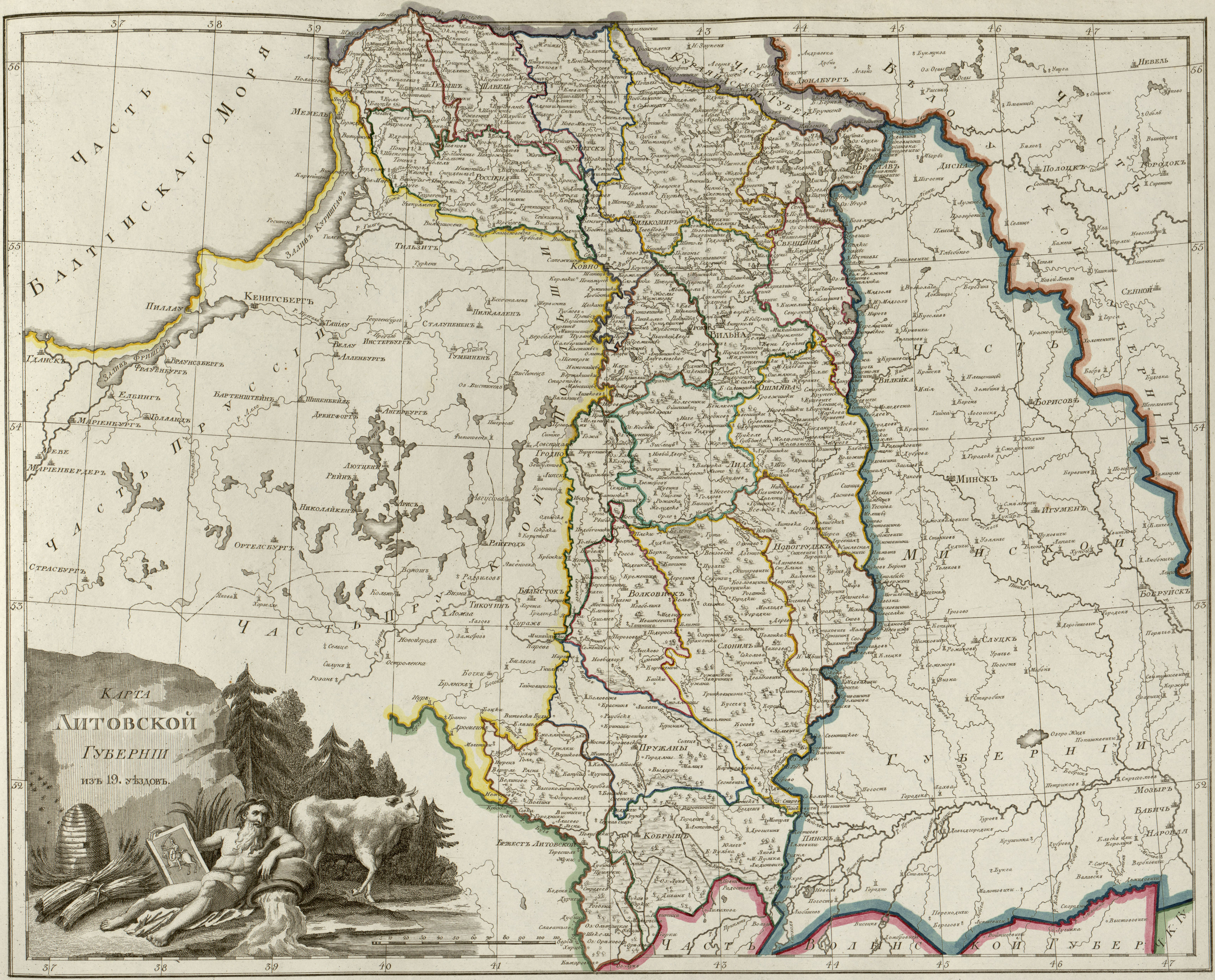
Lithuania Governorate was made of both Vilna Governorate and Grodno Governorate

Lithuania Governorate (Note: Russian: Литовская губерния, romanized: Litovksaya guberniya; Lithuanian: Lietuvos gubernija) was an administrative-territorial unit (guberniya) of the Russian Empire in 1796–1801.

After the third partition of the Polish–Lithuanian Commonwealth in 1795, the former territories of the Grand Duchy of Lithuania were divided between the Vilna Governorate and the Slonim Governorate by Catherine II of Russia. After her death just a year later, her son Paul I of Russia became the Emperor of Russia. He reversed or modified many of his mother's policies and decisions, including administrative divisions. On December 12, 1796, the two governorates were merged into one called the Lithuania Governorate with its capital in Vilnius. In 1801, Paul I was assassinated and the Lithuania Governorate was divided into the Lithuania-Vilna Governorate and the Lithuania-Grodno Governorate by his successor, Alexander I of Russia.
