= Provinces of the Russian Empire =

A map showing the provincial divisions of Imperial Russia as of 1727

Provinces (Russian: Провинция) were administrative divisions of the Russian Empire that existed between 1719 and 1775.

They were the next level of division after governorates. They were established as administrative units on 29 May 1719 with an edict (ukaz) of Peter the Great.
