= Belgorod Province =

Belgorod Province was a province of the Tsardom of Russia and later the Russian Empire between 1718 and 1775.
