= Vitebsk electoral district =

Constituency of the Russian Republic

Vitebsk
- Former Civilian constituency for the All-Russian Constituent Assembly
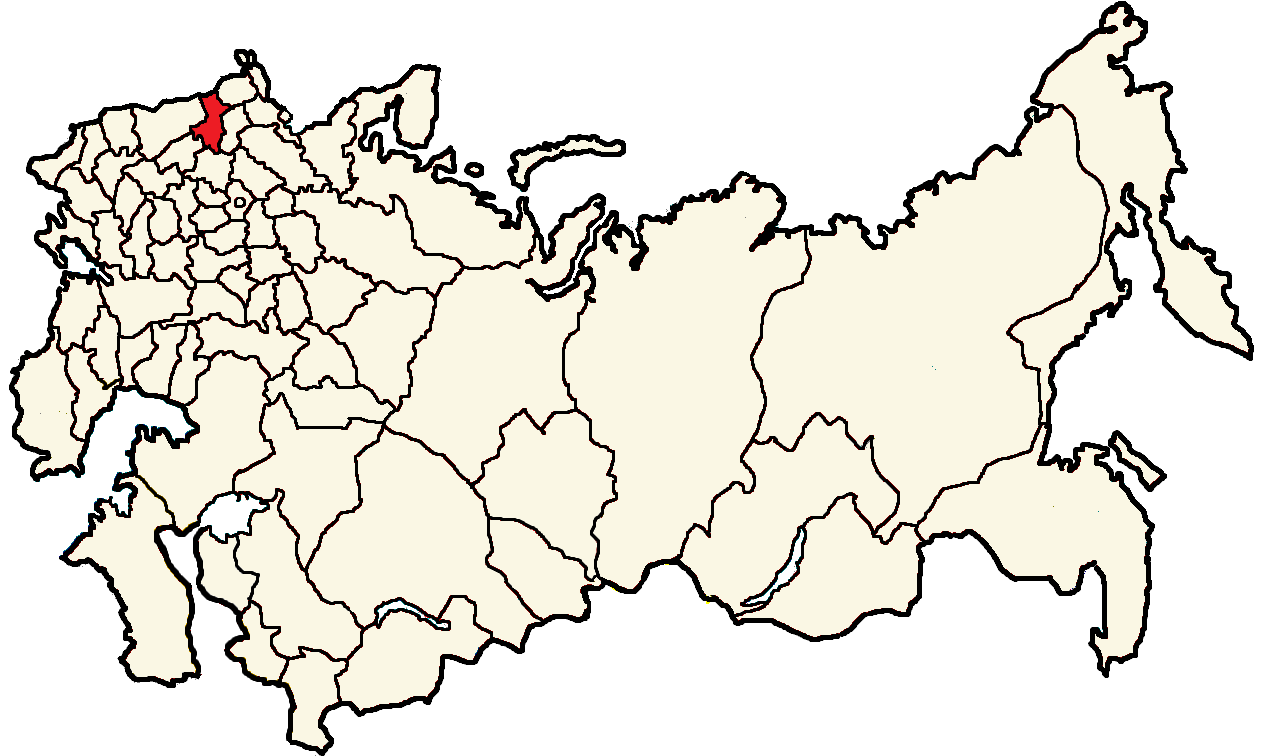

Former constituency
- Created: 1917
- Abolished: 1918
- Number of members: 9
- Number of Uyezd Electoral Commissions: 11
- Number of Urban Electoral Commissions: 2
- Number of Parishes: 195

The Vitebsk electoral district (Russian: Витебский избирательный округ) was a constituency created for the 1917 Russian Constituent Assembly election. The electoral district covered the Vitebsk Governorate. White Russian separatism was a negligible force in the electoral district.

On May 9–10, 1917 the 1st Latgallian Latvian Congress was held, which demanded the separation of Latgale from the Vitebsk governorate and integration with Latvia. In the Latgale region, which had an ethnic Latvian population and would later get annexed to independent Latvia, the Bolsheviks received over 50% of the votes cast. Nevertheless, Latgale had a notably weaker Bolshevik vote than neighbouring Livonia (with 72% Bolshevik vote) and the Latvian Rifles regiment (96% Bolshevik vote), possibly linked to opposition to Bolshevik policies from the Catholic Church and Jewish business sectors. The socio-economic conditions were different in Latgale than other Latvian regions, having a less educated and more religiously oriented population.

== Candidates ==
=== List 1 – Socialist-Revolutionary Party ===
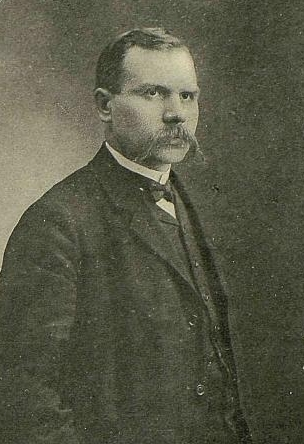
Andrius Bulota, former State Duma deputy, was the third candidate on the list of the Socialist-Revolutionary Party

Candidates of List 1
1.	Alexander Gizetti	Petrograd, writer. Gizetti was nominated by the Central Committee of the Socialist-Revolutionary Party;
2.	Maxim Boldysh	Bolshoye Pokotino village, Nikolaev Volost, Polotsky Uyezd, Peasant
3.	Andrius Bulota	Petrograd, former member of the 2nd and 3rd State Dumas, member of the All-Russian Central Executive Committee of the Soviets of Workers' and Soldiers' Deputies
4.	Yuda Novakovsky	Petrograd, member of the All-Russian Central Executive Committee of the Soviets of Workers' and Soldiers' Deputies
5.	Iosif Ruskul	Skinchi village, Mikhailovsky Volost, Lutsinsky Uyezd, Peasant
6.	Mikhail Tsetlin	Chairman of the Vitebsk Committee of the Socialist-Revolutionary Party
7.	Daniil Vasilevsky	Representing the peasantry of Polotsky Uyezd. Popular educator. Chairman of Polotsky Uyezd Zemstvo Council.
8.	Alexander Prokofiev	Vitebsk. Popular educator. Representing the peasants of the Gorodoksky Uyezd, member of the Vitebsk Provincial Executive committee of the Soviet of Peasants Deputies
9.	Nerses Aslanov	Vitebsk. Deputy Chairman of the Vitebsk Provincial Soviet of Peasants Deputies
10.	Grigory Katzenelenbogen	Rezhitsa. Chairman of the Rezhitsa Soviet of Workers, Soldiers and Peasants Deputies
11.	Mark Lyakhovsky	Zaprudye village, Staroselskaya Volost, Vitebsky Uyezd. Peasant
12.	Vasily Moiseev	Vitebsk. Chairman of the Provincial Soviet of Peasants Deputies

=== List 2 – Trudovik Popular-Socialist Party ===
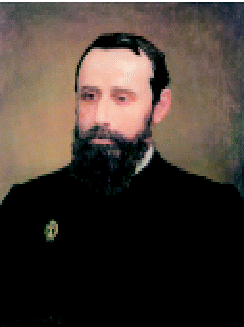
Alexander Zarudny, who had served as Minister of Justice in the Russian Provisional Government, headed the Trudovik list

Candidates of List 2
1.	Alexander Zarudny
2.	Leon Bramson
3.	Vladimir Karpov
4.	Mikhail Bogdanov
5.	Nikolai Kislyakov
6.	Alexander Likhnitsky
7.	Alexander Kyusse-Tyuz
8.	Alexander Shestov
9.	Evgeny Alonov
10.	Vasily Tretyakov
11.	Mikhail Demidov
12.	Vasily Stolpovsky
13.	Pavel Solovyov

=== List 3 – Kadets ===
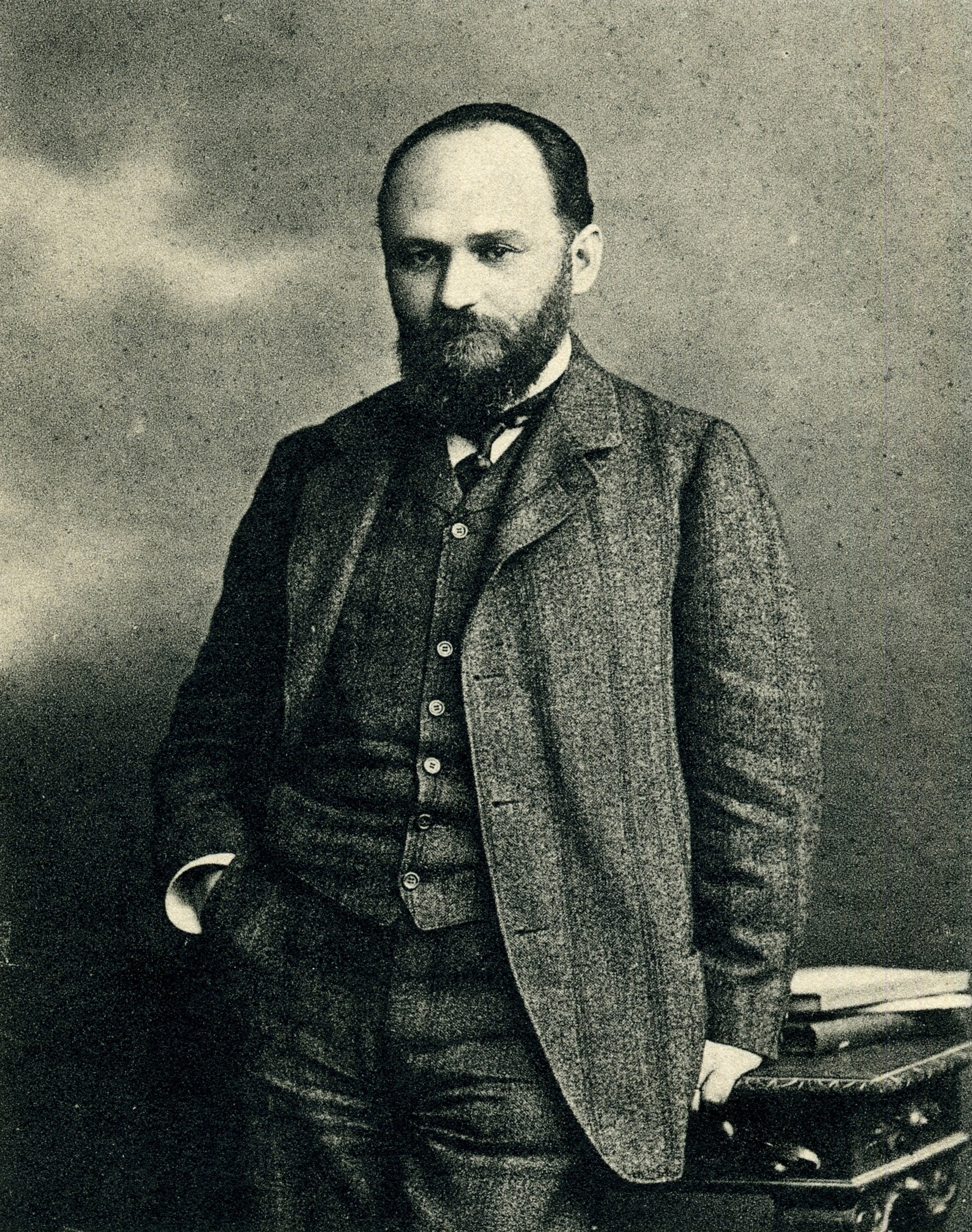
Maxim Vinaver headed the Kadet list

Candidates of List 3
1.	Maxim Vinaver
2.	Vasily Stepanov
3.	Emmanuil Dubossarsky
4.	Olga Nechaeva
5.	Parfeniy Vasiliev
6.	Evgeny Senkovsky
7.	Semyon Burkov
8.	Alexey Luzgin
9.	Ivan Abmorshev

=== List 4 – Latgale Socialist Party of Working People ===
Candidates of List 4
1.	Francis Kemps
2.	Aloizijs Skruls
3.	Zenons Laizāns
4.	Francs Vilcāns

=== List 5 – Bolsheviks ===
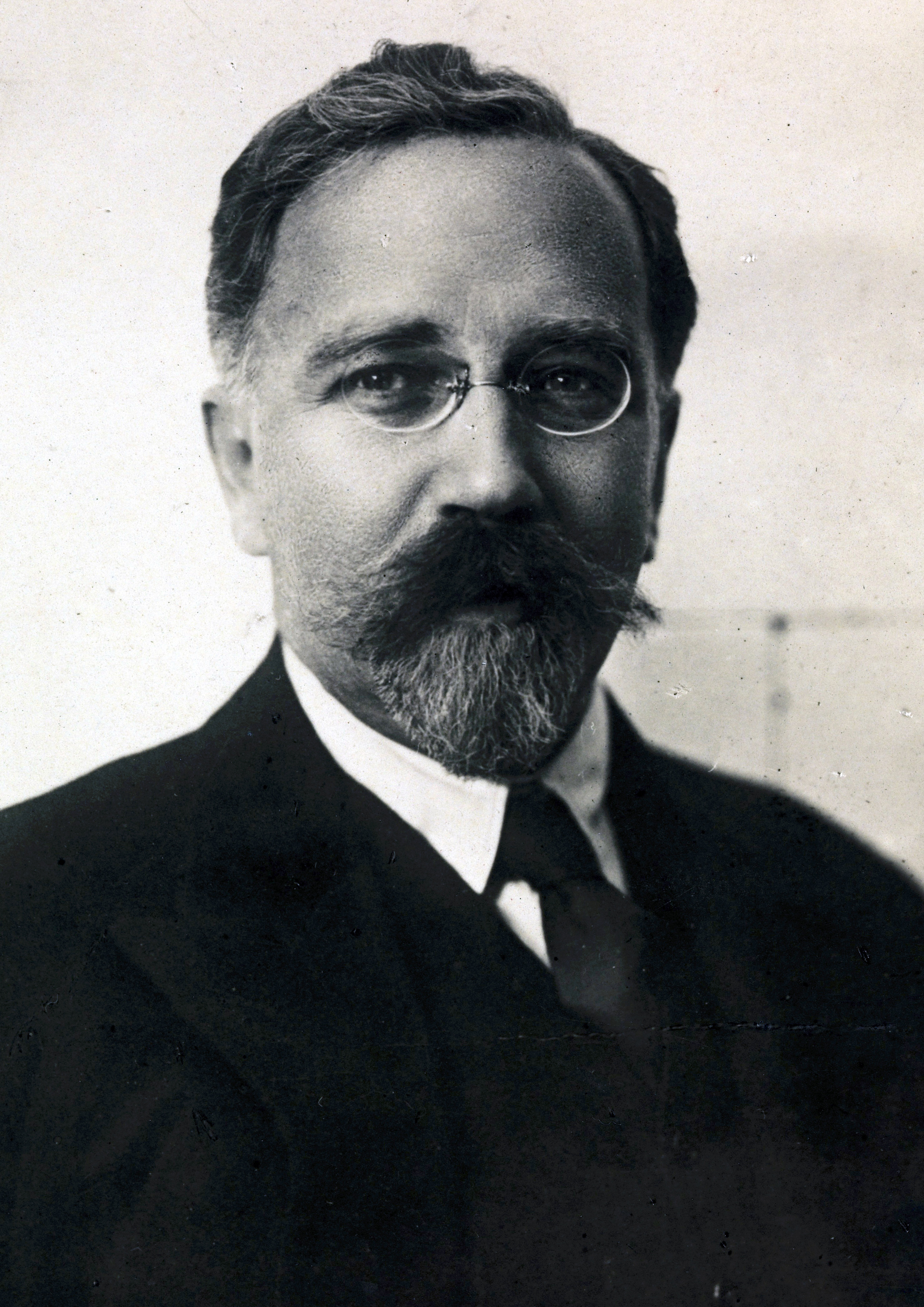
Lev Kamenev headed the Bolshevik list

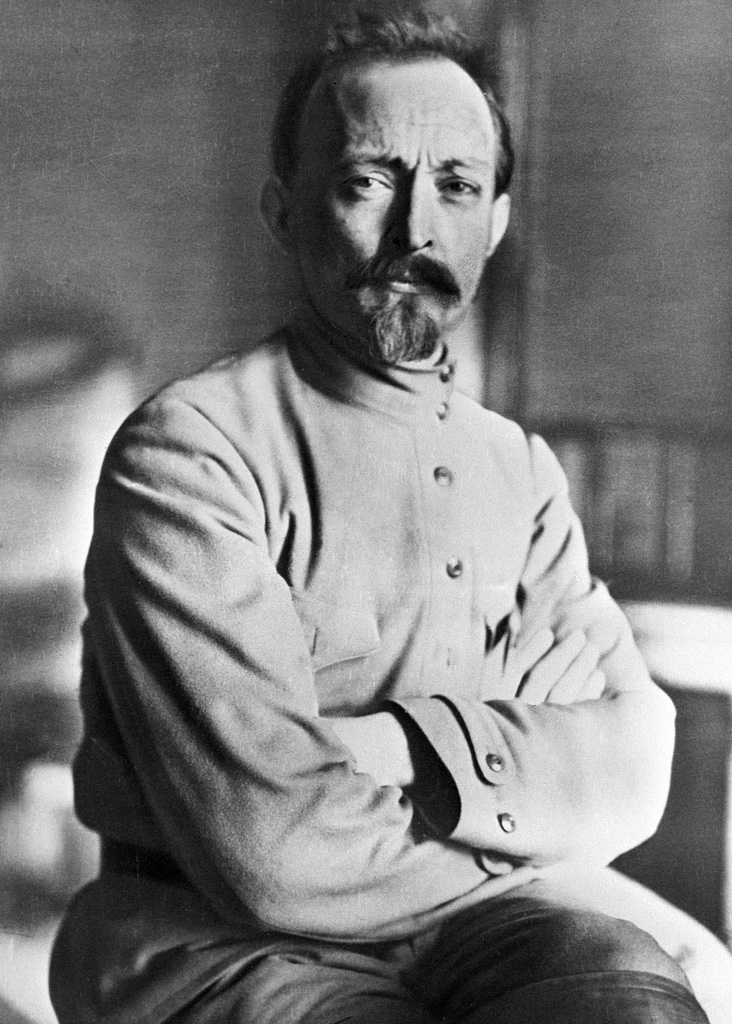
Felix Dzerzhinsky occupied the second slot on the Bolshevik list

Candidates of List 5
1.	Lev Kamenev	Petrograd
2.	Felix Dzerzhinsky	Petrograd
3.	Sarkis Sarkisyants	Vitebsk
4.	Stefan Chesheyko-Sokhatsky	Dvinsk
5.	Boris Pinson	Vitebsk
6.	Zalman Ryvkin	Velizh
7.	Vilis Chunchin	Vitebsk
8.	Zinovy Filippovsky	Kolyshki, Vitebsky Uyezd
9.	Naum Lagovier	Velizh
10.	Ivan Litvin	Dvinsk
11.	Ephraim Sklyansky	5th Army, 149th Black Sea Regiment
12.	Nikolai Peskovsky	Rezhitsa
13.	Aleksei Badaev	Petrograd

=== List 6 – Bloc of the Vitebsk Belorussian People's Union and the Orthodox Parishes of the Faith of the Polotsk Diocese ===
Candidates of List 6
1.	Georgy Polonsky
2.	Boris Byalynitsky-Birulya
3.	Foma Litvinov
4.	Mikhail Sokolov
5.	Alexey Sukharev
6.	Trofim Bavshuto
7.	Fedor Grigorovich
8.	Trofim Zaitsev
9.	Andrei Starovoitov
10.	Foma Podkhilko

=== List 7 – Jewish National Electoral Committee ===
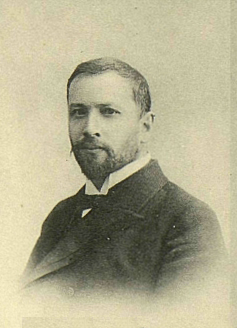
Naphtali Friedman headed the list of the Jewish National Electoral Committee.

Candidates of List 7
1.	Naphtali Friedman
2.	Grigorii Bruk
3.	Julius Brutzkus
4.	Isaac Berger
5.	Chaim Grinberg

=== List 8 – Vitebsk Provincial Union of Land Owners and Society of Old Believers of Vitebsk Governorate ===
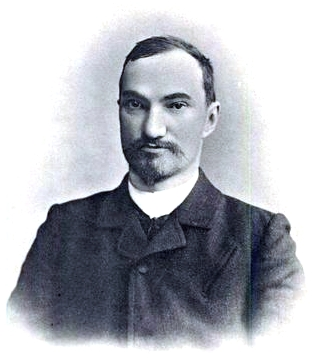
Sergey Kotlyarevsky headed the joint list of Land Owners and Old Believers

Candidates of List 8
1.	Sergey Kotlyarevsky
2.	Gury Gusakov
3.	Leonid Kopatsinsky
4.	Andrey Kovalev
5.	Andrey Janson
6.	Varfolomey Saveliev
7.	Khristian Bigge
8.	Vatslav Kossov
9.	Bronislav Mirsky

=== List 9 – Mensheviks and Bund ===
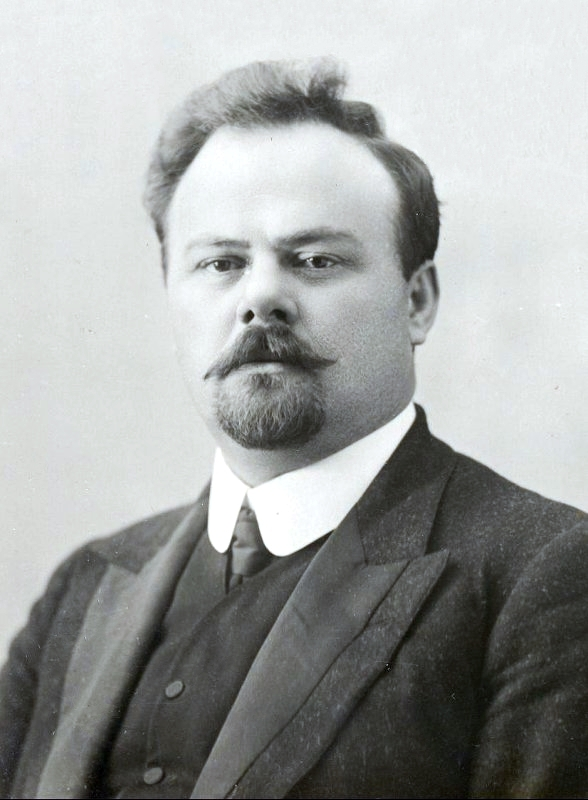
Akaki Chkhenkeli headed the Menshevik-Bund list

Candidates of List 9
1.	Akaki Chkhenkeli
2.	Raphael Abramovitch
3.	Kuzma Gvozdev
4.	Malka Frumkina-Wichman
5.	Alexander Matskanov
6.	Grigory Aronson
7.	Vladimir Sivitsky
8.	Alexander Matskov
9.	Shmul Chizhevsky
10.	Pomorov
11.	Grigory Levin
12.	Mikhail Podashevsky

=== List 10 – United Polish Organizations ===
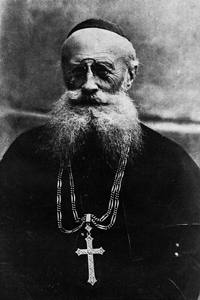
Roman Catholic metropolitan archbishop Eduard von der Ropp headed the Polish list

Candidates of List 10
1.	Eduard von der Ropp
2.	Henry Dymsha
3.	Stanisław Łopaciński
4.	Konrad Nedzvetsky
5.	Józef Czesnowicki
6.	Vikenty Baliul
7.	Adam Buynitsky
8.	Stanisław Zdanowicz

=== List 11 – Socialists-Federalists and Peasants of Latgale ===
Candidates of List 11
1.	Antons Skrinda
2.	Zigfrīds Anna Meierovics
3.	Antons Laizāns
4.	Valeriya Seyl'
5.	Aloīzijs Bojārs
6.	Nikolay Manuilov
7.	Pēteris Zalāns
8.	Doroško Donāts
9.	Eduards Kozlovskis
10.	Antons Zvidrins
11.	Viktors Gabranovs
12.	Daniels Gabruševs

Zigfrīds Anna Meierovics withdrew his candidature before the election, leaving 11 candidates on the list.

=== List 12 – Lettish Democrats-Nationalists ===
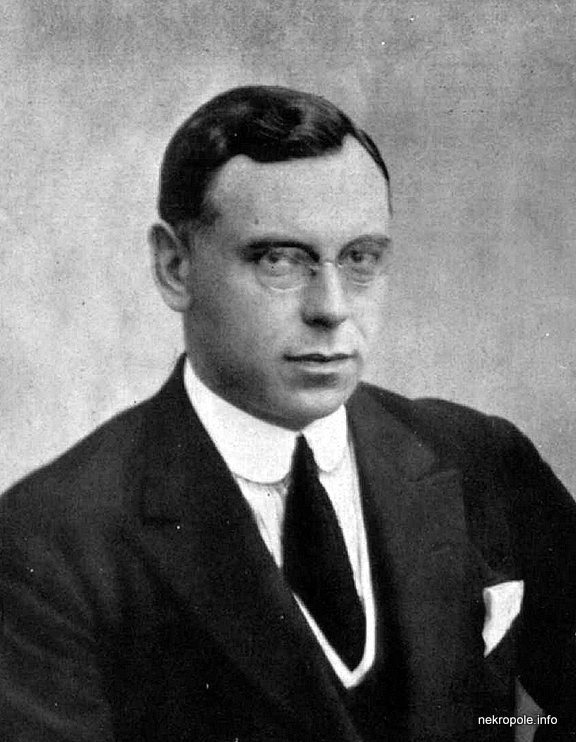
Zigfrīds Anna Meierovics, later the Prime Minister of Latvia, was the second candidate of the Lettish Democrat-Nationalist list

Candidates of List 12
1.	Jurijs Pabergs
2.	Zigfrīds Anna Meierovics
3.	Ivans Grišāns
4.	Iosifs Kindzuls
5.	Petrs Lazdans
6.	Staņislavs Kambala
7.	Donats Lačkajs-Lače

=== List 13 – Peasants of Vitebsk Governorate ===
Candidates of List 13
1.	Alexander Lobus
2.	Nikolay Novikov
3.	Boris Tyasto (withdrew his candidature - replaced by Ivan Zagulov)
4.	Yakov Alekseev
5.	Vladimir Puzynya
6.	Semyon Gushchenko
7.	Tit Kovalenok

=== List 14 – Citizens of the Bolets Volost, Gorodoksky Uyezd ===
Candidates of List 14
1.	Ivan Kuzminsky

Kuzminsky was member of the Left Socialist-Revolutionaries, peasant from Potashenskaya Volost, Gorodoksky Uyezd.

== Results ==
Vitebsk
Party	Vote	%	Seats
List 5 - Bolsheviks	287,101	51.22	6
List 1 - Socialist-Revolutionaries	150,279	26.81	3
List 11 - Socialist-Federalists and Peasants of Latgale	26,990	4.82	
List 7 - Jewish National Electoral Committee	24,790	4.42	
List 9 - Mensheviks-Bund	12,471	2.22	
List 10 - United Polish Organizations	10,556	1.88	
List 13 - Peasants of Vitebsk Governorate	9,752	1.74	
List 6 - Vitebsk Belarusian People’s Union and Orthodox Parishes of the Faith of the Polotsk Diocese	9,019	1.61	
List 3 - Kadets	8,132	1.45	
List 8 - Landowners and Old Believers	6,098	1.09	
List 12 - Lettish Democrats-Nationalists	5,881	1.05	
List 4 - Latgallian Popular Committee and Latgallian Socialist Party of Working People	5,118	0.91	
List 2 - Popular Socialists	3,599	0.64	
List 14 - Citizens of Boletskii Volost of Gorodsky Uezd	752	0.13	
Total:	560,538		9

Deputies Elected
Boldysh	SR
Bulota	SR
Gizetti	SR
Ceshejko-Sochacki	Bolshevik
Dzerzhinsky	Bolshevik
Kamenev	Bolshevik
Pinson	Bolshevik
Rivkin	Bolshevik
Sarkisyants	Bolshevik

=== Vitebsk town ===
In Vitebsk town, the Bolsheviks got 11,875 votes (34.8%), the Jewish National Electoral Committee 5,772 votes (16.9%), the Menshevik-Bund list 3,822 votes (11.3%), the White Russian/Orthodox list 3,058 votes (8.9%), the SRs 3,053 votes (8.9%), the Kadets 2,365 votes (6.9%), the Polish list 2,169 votes (6.4%), the Popular Socialists 958 votes (2.9%), the Lettish Democrats-Nationalists 395 votes (1.1%), the Landowners/Old Believers list 375 votes (1.1%), the peasants' list 197 votes (0.5%), Latgallian Socialist-Federalists 68 votes (0.2%), Latgallian nationalists 20 votes (0.1%) and 12 votes for the Boletsky volost citizens' list.
