= Pustoshkinsky District =

Pustoshkinsky District Пустошкинский район (Russian)
- District
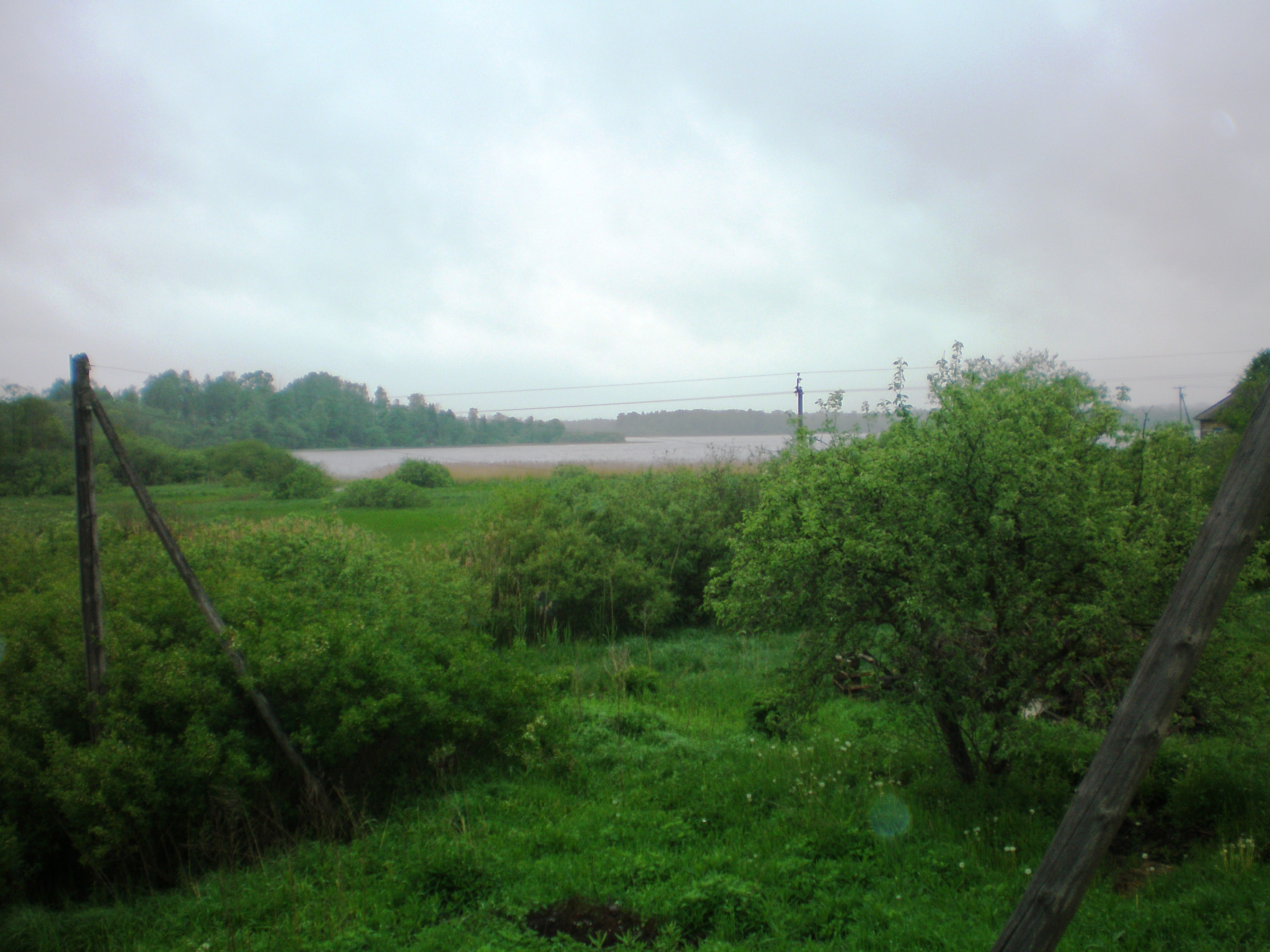
- Lake Krupeyskoye, close to the town of Pustoshka in Pustoshkinsky District

- Flag Coat of arms
- Location of Pushoshkinsky District in Pskov Oblast
- Coordinates: 56°20′N 29°22′E
- Country: Russia
- Federal subject: Pskov Oblast
- Established: 1 August 1927
- Administrative center: Pustoshka

Area
  - Total: 1,870 km^{2} (720 sq mi)

Population (2010 Census)
  - Total: 9,379
  - Density: 5.02/km^{2} (13.0/sq mi)
  - Urban: 49.2%
  - Rural: 50.8%

Administrative structure
  - Inhabited localities: 1 cities/towns, 244 rural localities

Municipal structure
  - Municipally incorporated as: Pustoshkinsky Municipal District
  - Municipal divisions: 1 urban settlements, 5 rural settlements
- Time zone: UTC+3 (MSK)
- OKTMO ID: 58650000
- Website: http://pustoshka.reg60.ru

Pustoshkinsky District (Russian: Пусто́шкинский райо́н) is an administrative and municipal district (raion), one of the twenty-four in Pskov Oblast, Russia. It is located in the south of the oblast and borders with Bezhanitsky District in the north, Novosokolnichesky District in the east, Nevelsky District in the south, Sebezhsky District in the west, and with Opochetsky District in the northwest. The area of the district is 1,870 square kilometers (720 sq mi). Its administrative center is the town of Pustoshka. Population: 9,379 (2010 census); 12,071 (2002 Census); 14,063 (1989 Soviet census). The population of Pustoshka accounts for 49.2% of the district's total population.

== Geography ==
A major part of the district lies in the basin of the Velikaya River. The Velikaya flows through the district, making a bow in its northern part. The largest tributary of the Velikaya inside the district is the Alolya (right). The rivers in the south of the district drain into the Nevedryanka, a right tributary of the Daugava, and into the Ushcha, also in the Daugava basin. The landscape of the district is a hilly plain of glacial origin, which contains many lakes. The biggest lakes in the district are Nevedro, Asho, Orleya, Veryato, and Losno.

== History ==
The Velikaya River served as one of the branches of the trade route from the Varangians to the Greeks, and the area was settled at least from the medieval times. It was dependent on Pskov and in the beginning on the 15th century it was conquered by Lithuanians. Afterwards, it was on the border between Russia (Grand Duchy of Moscow) and Poland, changing hands. The seat of the area was Zavolochye. In 1582, the area was transferred to Russia. In the course of the administrative reform carried out in 1708 by Peter the Great, the area was included into Ingermanland Governorate (known since 1710 as Saint Petersburg Governorate). In 1727, separate Novgorod Governorate was split off, and in 1772, Pskov Governorate (which between 1777 and 1796 existed as Pskov Viceroyalty) was established. In 1777, Novorzhev was founded and Zavolochye was abolished. The area was split between several uyezds of Pskov Governorate. Pustoshka was founded in 1901 as a railway station during the construction of the railway between Moscow and Riga.

On August 1, 1927, the uyezds were abolished and Pustoshkinsky District was established, with the administrative center in Pustoshka. It included parts of former Sebezhsky, Nevelsky, and Opochetsky Uyezds. The governorates were abolished as well, and the district became a part of Velikiye Luki Okrug of Leningrad Oblast. On June 17, 1929, the district was transferred to Western Oblast. On July 23, 1930, the okrugs were also abolished and the districts were directly subordinated to the oblast. On January 29, 1935, the district was transferred to Kalinin Oblast, and on February 5 of the same year, Pustoshkinsky District became a part of Velikiye Luki Okrug of Kalinin Oblast, one of the okrugs abutting the state boundaries of the Soviet Union. On May 4, 1938, the district was transferred to Opochka Okrug. On February 5, 1941, the okrug was abolished. Between 1941 and 1944, Pustoshkinsky District was occupied by German troops. On August 22, 1944, the district was transferred to newly established Velikiye Luki Oblast. On October 2, 1957, Velikiye Luki Oblast was abolished and Pustoshkinsky District was transferred to Pskov Oblast. The district was abolished on February 1, 1963, and re-established on January 12, 1965.

On August 1, 1927, Kudeversky District with the administrative center in the selo of Kudever was also established. It included parts of former Novorzhevsky Uyezd. The district was a part of Pskov Okrug of Leningrad Oblast. On September 20, 1931, Kudeversky District was abolished and merged into Novorzhevsky District. On March 5, 1935, it was re-established as a part of Velikiye Luki Okrug of Kalinin Oblast; on May 11, 1937, the district was transferred to Opochka Okrug. On August 22, 1944, the district was transferred to Velikiye Luki Oblast. On October 2, 1957, Velikiye Luki Oblast was abolished, and Kudeversky District was transferred to Pskov Oblast. On January 14, 1958, Kudeversky District was abolished and split between Bezhanitsky, Novorzhevsky, Opochetsky, and Pustoshkinsky Districts.

Another district created on August 1, 1927 was Rykovsky District with the administrative center in the selo of Skokovo. It included parts of former Velikoluksky and Opochetsky Uyezds. The district was a part of Velikiye Luki Okrug of Leningrad Oblast. On June 17, 1929, the district was transferred to Western Oblast. On September 20, 1930, Rykovsky District was abolished and split between Nasvinsky, Loknyansky, Novosokolnichesky, and Pustoshkinsky Districts.

On December 10, 1928, Ust-Dolyssky District with the administrative center in the village of Ust-Dolyssy was created on the territories which previously belonged to Pustoshkinsky and Nevelsky Districts. It was a part of Velikiye Luki Okrug of Leningrad Oblast. On June 17, 1929, the district was transferred to Western Oblast, and on September 20, 1930, Ust-Dolyssky District was abolished and split between Nevelsky and Pustoshkinsky Districts. On February 5, 1952, it was re-established as a part of Velikiye Luki Oblast; on October 2, 1957, the district was transferred to Pskov Oblast. On March 23, 1959, Ust-Dolyssky District was abolished and split between Nevelsky and Pustoshkinsky Districts.

== Economy ==
=== Industry ===
The biggest industrial enterprise in the district is the milk production factory.

=== Agriculture ===
The economy of the district is mainly based on agriculture. The main agricultural specializations are milk and meat production, as well as potato growing.

=== Transportation ===
The railway connecting Moscow and Riga crosses the district from east to west, with Pustoshka being the principal station within the district.

There are two significant highways crossing the district. The M9 highway which connects Moscow and Riga crosses the district from east to west. The M20 highway connects St. Petersburg and Kiev, crossing the district from north to south. The two highways cross in the town of Pustoshka. There are also local roads.

== Culture and recreation ==
The district contains two cultural heritage monuments of federal significance and additionally fourteen objects classified as cultural and historical heritage of local significance. Both federally protected monuments are archeological sites.

Pustoshka hosts the Pustoshkinsky District Museum, founded in 1996.
