= Novosokolnichesky District =

Novosokolnichesky District Новосокольнический район (Russian)
- District
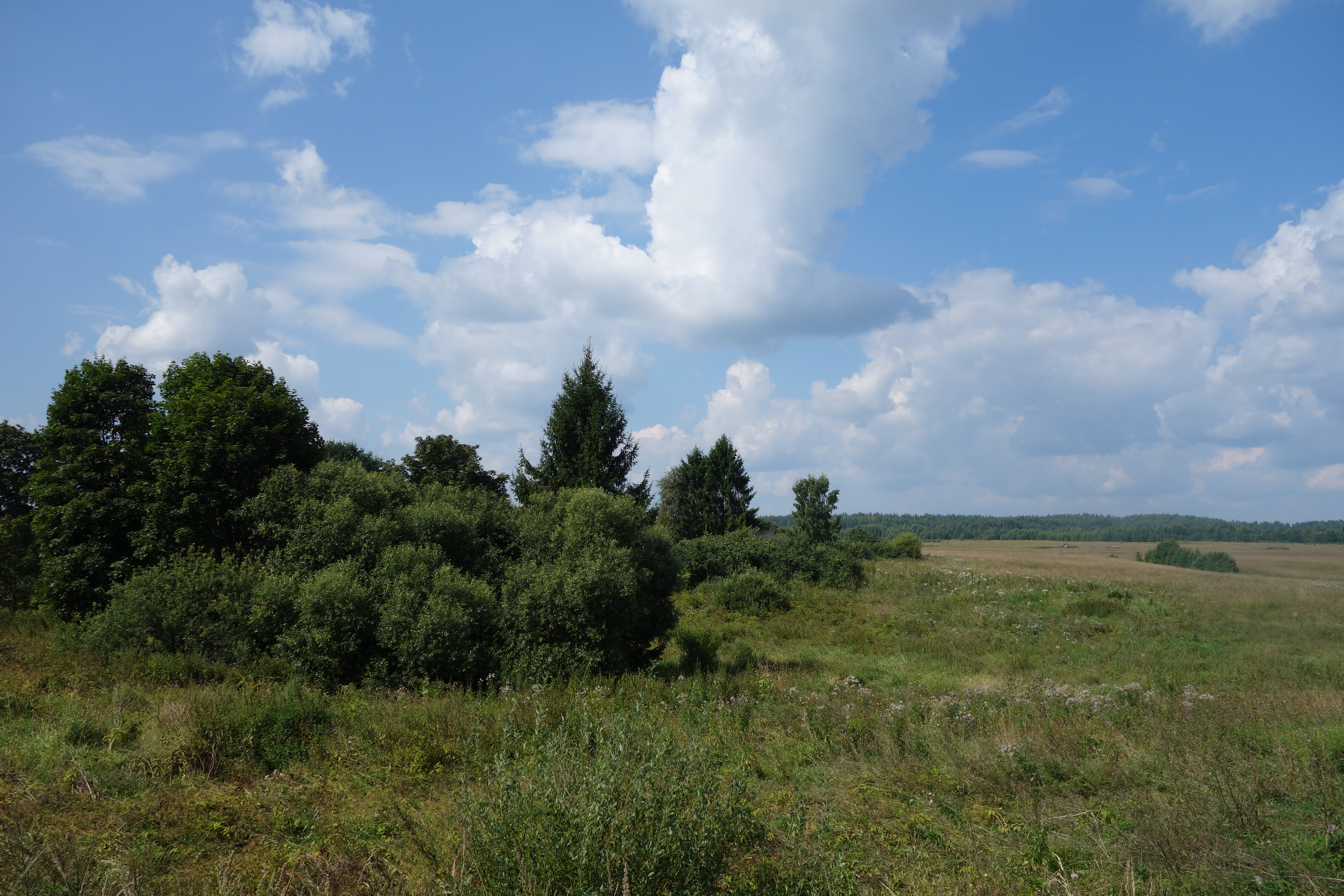
- Forests and Fields, Novosokolnichesky District

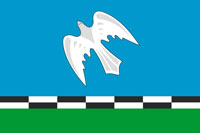
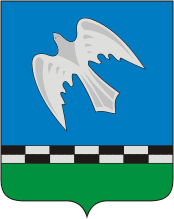
- Flag Coat of arms
- Location of Novosokolnichesky District in Pskov Oblast
- Coordinates: 56°20′N 30°09′E
- Country: Russia
- Federal subject: Pskov Oblast
- Established: 1927
- Administrative center: Novosokolniki

Area
  - Total: 1,616.0 km^{2} (623.9 sq mi)

Population (2010 Census)
  - Total: 14,776
  - Density: 9.1436/km^{2} (23.682/sq mi)
  - Urban: 54.9%
  - Rural: 45.1%

Administrative structure
  - Inhabited localities: 1 cities/towns, 275 rural localities

Municipal structure
  - Municipally incorporated as: Novosokolnichesky Municipal District
  - Municipal divisions: 1 urban settlements, 9 rural settlements
- Time zone: UTC+3 (MSK)
- OKTMO ID: 58626000
- Website: http://novosokolniki.reg60.ru

Novosokolnichesky District (Russian: Новосо́кольнический райо́н) is an administrative and municipal district (raion), one of the twenty-four in Pskov Oblast, Russia. It is located in the south of the oblast and borders with Loknyansky District in the north, Velikoluksky District in the east, Nevelsky District in the south, Pustoshkinsky District in the west, and with Bezhanitsky District in the northwest. The area of the district is 1,616.0 square kilometers (623.9 sq mi). Its administrative center is the town of Novosokolniki. Population: 14,776 (2010 census); 19,389 (2002 Census); 21,319 (1989 Soviet census). The population of Novosokolniki accounts for 54.9% of the district's total population.

== Geography ==
Novosokolnichesky District is located in the Bezhanitsy Hills, a hilly plateau of glacial origin, and the area of the district is divided between the drainage basins of the Neva and the Narva. The rivers in the northwest and in the west of the district drain into the Velikaya River, which belongs to the Narva River basin. The source of the Velikaya is located in the district as well. The major part of the area of the district belongs to the drainage basin of the Lovat, which is a tributary of Lake Ilmen and belongs to the Neva basin. The main rivers in the district which belong to the drainage basin of the Lovat are the Nasva and the Smerdel.

31.2% of the area of the district is covered by forests.

== History ==
In the 19th century, the area was split between Velikoluksky Uyezd of Pskov Governorate and Nevelsky Uyezd of Vitebsk Governorate. Novosokolniki was founded in 1901 as a station of the railway which connected Moscow and Riga. It was granted town status in 1925. After 1919, Vitebsk Governorate was a part of Russian Soviet Federative Socialist Republic. In 1924, Vitebsk Governorate was abolished, and Nevelsky Uyezd was transferred to Pskov Governorate.

On August 1, 1927, the uyezds were abolished, and Novosokolnichesky District was established, with the administrative center in the town of Novosokolniki. It included parts of former Velikoluksky and Nevelsky Uyezds. Pskov Governorate was abolished as well, and the district became a part of Velikiye Luki Okrug of Leningrad Oblast. On June 17, 1929, the district was transferred to Western Oblast. On July 23, 1930, the okrugs were also abolished and the districts were directly subordinated to the oblast. On January 29, 1935, the district was transferred to Kalinin Oblast, and on February 5 of the same year, Novosokolnichesky District became a part of Velikiye Luki Okrug of Kalinin Oblast, one of the okrugs abutting the state boundaries of the Soviet Union. On May 4, 1938, the district was subordinated directly to the oblast. Between 1941 and 1944, Novosokolnichesky District was occupied by German troops. On August 22, 1944, the district was transferred to newly established Velikiye Luki Oblast. On October 2, 1957, Velikiye Luki Oblast was abolished, and Novosokolnichesky District was transferred to Pskov Oblast.

On August 1, 1927 Rykovsky District with the administrative center in the selo of Skokovo was also created. It included parts of former Velikoluksky and Opochetsky Uyezds. The district was a part of Velikiye Luki Okrug of Leningrad Oblast. On June 17, 1929 the district was transferred to Western Oblast. On September 20, 1930, Rykovsky District was abolished and split between Nasvinsky, Loknyansky, Novosokolnichesky, and Pustoshkinsky Districts.

Another district established on August 1, 1927 was Nasvinsky District, with the administrative center in the settlement of Nasva. It included parts of former Velikoluksky Uyezd. The district was a part of Velikiye Luki Okrug of Leningrad Oblast. On June 17, 1929 the district was transferred to Western Oblast. On January 1, 1932, Nasvinsky District was abolished and split between Loknyansky, Velikoluksky, and Novosokolnichesky Districts.

== Economy ==
=== Industry ===
The district has enterprises of textile and food industries.

=== Agriculture ===
The main specialization of agriculture in the district is meat and milk production. In 2011, there were nine large- and mid-scale farms in the district.

=== Transportation ===
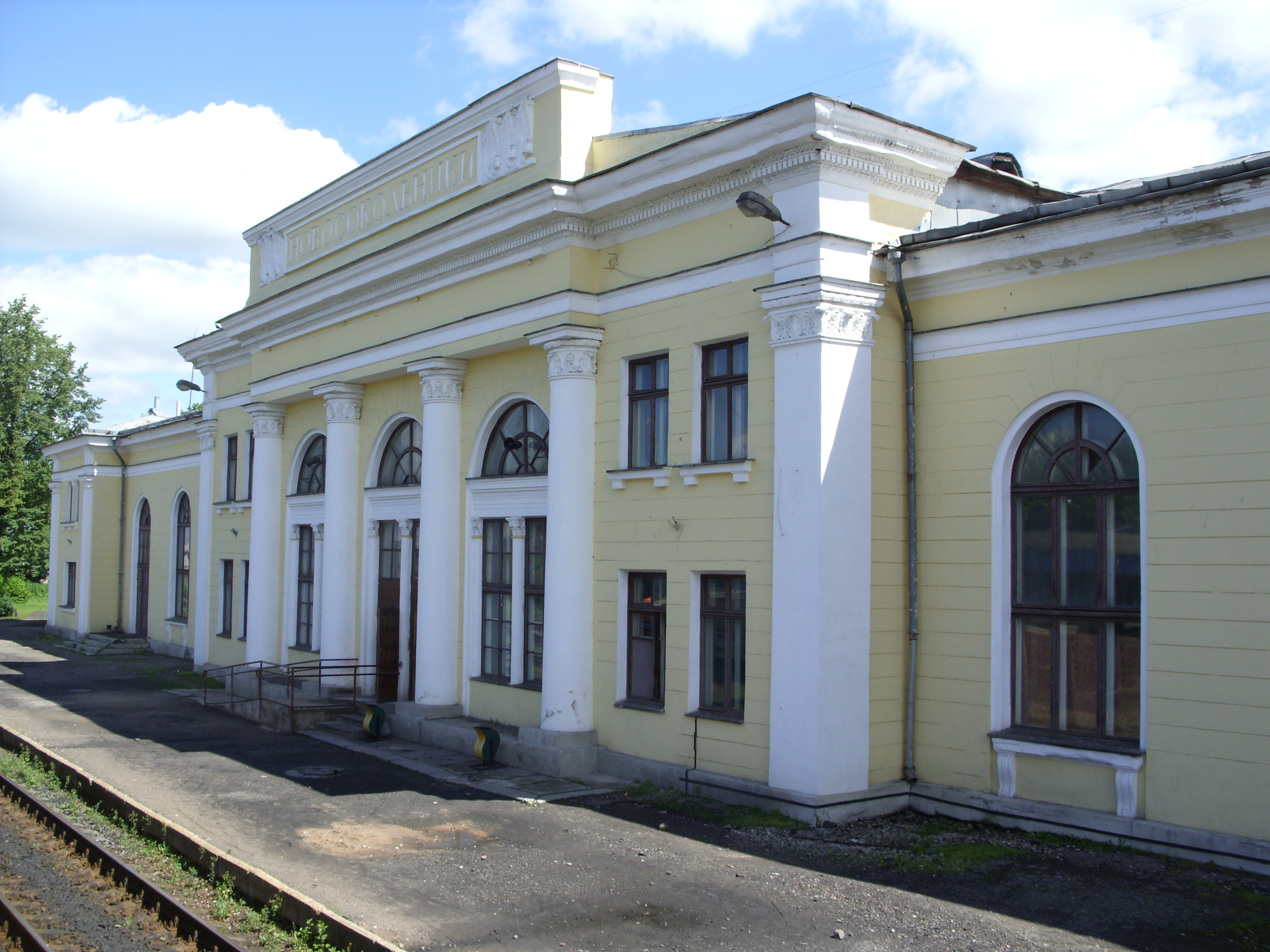
The railway station in Novosokolniki

Novosokolniki is an important railway hub, located at the crossing of two lines. One railway connects Moscow and Velikiye Luki with Riga and runs in the east–west direction. Another railway, running in the north–south direction, connects Saint Petersburg and Dno with Nevel. In Nevel, south of Novosokolniki, it splits into two railway lines, both running southeast into Belarus: One line to Vitebsk, and another one to Grodno via Polotsk and Molodechno.

The M9 highway which connects Moscow and Riga crosses the district from east to west. Novosokolniki has an easy access to the highway. Novosokolniki is furthermore connected by roads with Velikiye Luki and Nevel. A road connecting Velikiye Luki and Porkhov via Loknya crosses the northeastern part of the district. There are also local roads.

== Culture and recreation ==
The district contains three objects classified as cultural and historical heritage of federal significance and twenty-six monuments of local significance. The federal monuments are the wooden church in the village of Nasteny, a monument to fallen soldiers, and an archeological site.
