= Pustoshka, Pustoshkinsky District, Pskov Oblast =

Town in Pskov Oblast, Russia

Pustoshka Пустошка
- Town
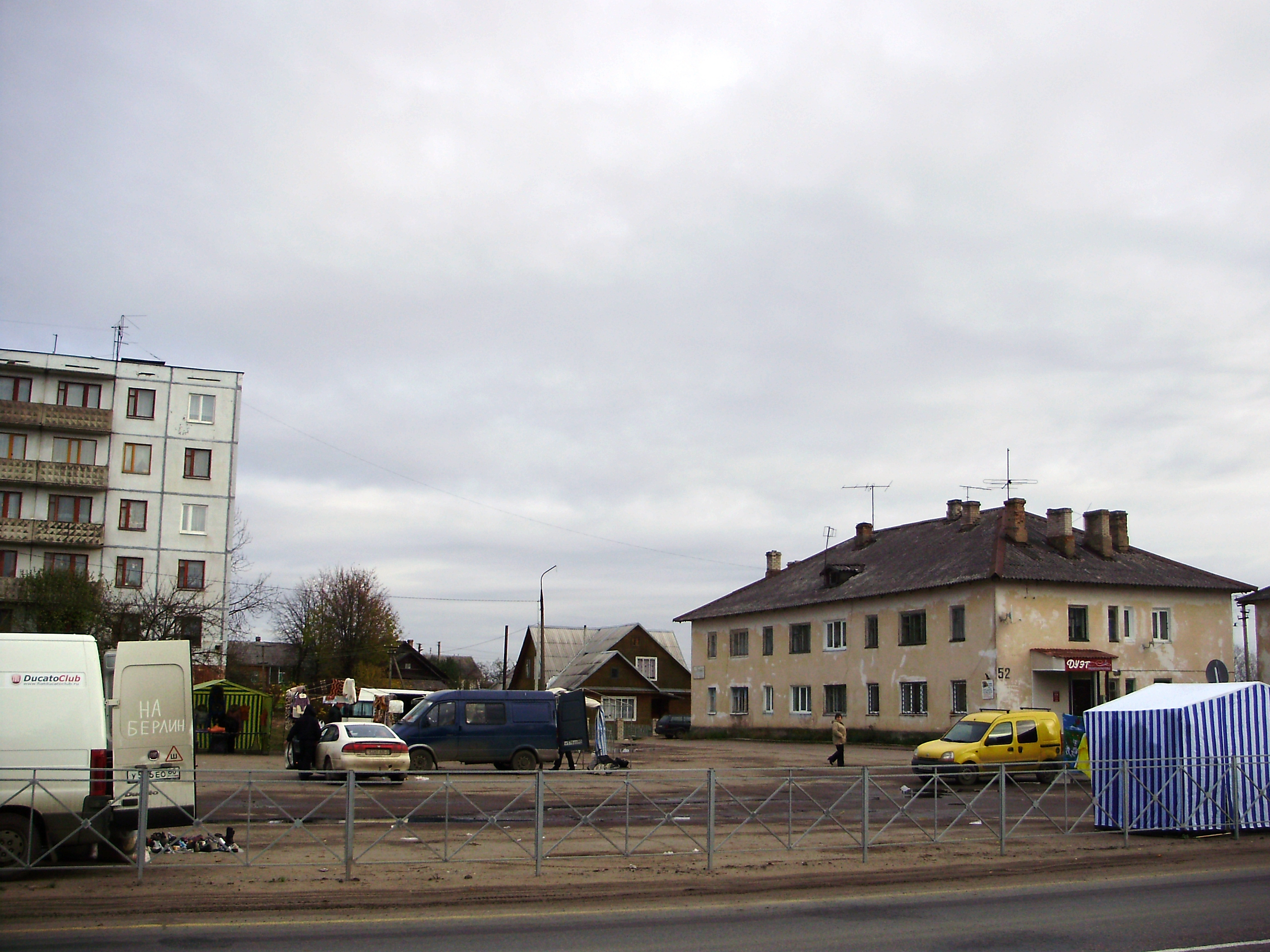
- Flea market in Pustoshka

- Coat of arms
- Interactive map of Pustoshka
- Location of Pustoshka Pustoshka (Pskov Oblast)
- Coordinates: 56°20′N 29°23′E
- Country: Russia
- Federal subject: Pskov Oblast
- Administrative district: Pustoshkinsky District
- Founded: 1901
- Town status since: 1925
- Elevation: 160 m (520 ft)

Population (2010 Census)
  - Total: 4,619
  - Estimate (2021): 4,070 (−11.9%)

Administrative status
  - Capital of: Pustoshkinsky District

Municipal status
  - Municipal district: Pustoshkinsky Municipal District
  - Urban settlement: Pustoshka Urban Settlement
  - Capital of: Pustoshkinsky Municipal District, Pustoshka Urban Settlement
- Time zone: UTC+3 (MSK)
- Postal code: 182300
- OKTMO ID: 58650101001

Pustoshka (Russian: Пусто́шка) is a town and the administrative center of Pustoshkinsky District in Pskov Oblast, Russia, located on the Krupeya River, 191 kilometers (119 mi) southeast of Pskov, the administrative center of the oblast. Population: 4,619 (2010 census); 5,509 (2002 census); 6,332 (1989 Soviet census).

== History ==
It was founded in 1901 due to the construction of a railway and was granted town status in 1925. At the time, it was the administrative center of Pustoshkinskaya Volost of Sebezhsky Uyezd in Pskov Governorate.

On August 1, 1927, the uyezds and governorates were abolished and Pustoshkinsky District, with the administrative center in Pustoshka, was established as a part of Velikiye Luki Okrug of Leningrad Oblast. It included parts of former Nevelsky, Opochetsky, and Sebezhsky Uyezds. On June 3, 1929, Pustoshkinsky District was transferred to Western Oblast. On July 23, 1930, the okrugs were also abolished and the districts were directly subordinated to the oblast. On January 29, 1935, Western Oblast was abolished and the district was transferred to Kalinin Oblast, and on February 5 of the same year, Pustoshkinsky District became a part of Velikiye Luki Okrug of Kalinin Oblast, one of the okrugs abutting the state boundaries of the Soviet Union. On May 4, 1938, the district was transferred to Opochka Okrug. On February 5, 1941, the okrug was abolished. Between July 16, 1941 and February 27, 1944, Pustoshka was occupied by German troops. On August 22, 1944, the district was transferred to newly established Velikiye Luki Oblast. On October 2, 1957, Velikiye Luki Oblast was abolished and Pustoshkinsky District was transferred to Pskov Oblast. The district was abolished on February 1, 1963 but reinstated on January 12, 1965.

== Administrative and municipal status ==
Within the framework of administrative divisions, Pustoshka serves as the administrative center of Pustoshkinsky District, to which it is directly subordinated. As a municipal division, the town of Pustoshka is incorporated within Pustoshkinsky Municipal District as Pustoshka Urban Settlement.

== Economy ==
=== Industry ===
The biggest industrial enterprise is the milk production factory.

=== Transportation ===
The railway connecting Moscow and Riga passes Pustoshka.

There are two significant highways crossing close to the town. The M9 Highway, which connects Moscow and Riga, runs in the east–west direction, whereas the M20 Highway connects St. Petersburg and Kyiv, running from north to south. There are also local roads.

== Culture and recreation ==
Pustoshka contains one cultural heritage monument of federal significance and additionally three objects classified as cultural and historical heritage of local significance. The federally protected monument is an archeological site, and the locally protected ones are monuments related to World War II.

Pustoshka is home to the Pustoshkinsky District Museum, founded in 1996.
