= Vitebsk Province =

Vitebsk Province may refer to one of the following

- Vitebsk Region of Belarus or Byelorussian SSR
- Vitebsk Governorate of Russian Empire
- Vitebsk Province of Pskov Governorate in 1772–1776.
