= Russian Giant =

The Russian Giant or Russian Giant may refer to:

- Fyodor Makhnov (1878–1912), the tallest person
- Nikolai Valuev (born 1973), Russian politician and former professional boxer
- Helianthus annuus 'Russian Giant', cultivar of sunflower
