= Novosokolniki =

Town in Pskov Oblast, Russia

Novosokolniki Новосокольники
- Town
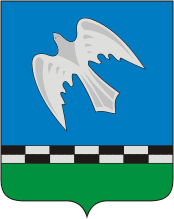
- Coat of arms
- Interactive map of Novosokolniki
- Location of Novosokolniki Novosokolniki (Pskov Oblast)
- Coordinates: 56°20′N 30°10′E
- Country: Russia
- Federal subject: Pskov Oblast
- Administrative district: Novosokolnichesky District
- Founded: 1901
- Town status since: 1925
- Elevation: 135 m (443 ft)

Population (2010 Census)
  - Total: 8,119
  - Estimate (2021): 6,895 (−15.1%)

Administrative status
  - Capital of: Novosokolnichesky District

Municipal status
  - Municipal district: Novosokolnichesky Municipal District
  - Urban settlement: Novosokolniki Urban Settlement
  - Capital of: Novosokolnichesky Municipal District, Novosokolniki Urban Settlement
- Time zone: UTC+3 (MSK)
- Postal code: 182200
- OKTMO ID: 58626101001

Novosokolniki (Russian: Новосоко́льники) is a town and the administrative center of Novosokolnichesky District in Pskov Oblast, Russia, located on the Maly Udray River at the junction of the St. Petersburg–Kyiv and Moscow–Riga railways, 287 kilometers (178 mi) southeast of Pskov, the administrative center of the oblast. Population: 8,119 (2010 census); 9,757 (2002 census); 10,689 (1989 Soviet census).

== History ==
It was founded in 1901 due to construction of the railway between Moscow and Riga. At the time, it was a part of Velikoluksky Uyezd in Pskov Governorate. The name is due to the nearby locality then known as Sokolniki, whose name in turn is derived from the Russian word "Russian: сокол" (sokol, meaning "falcon"), since the residents specialized on breeding falcons for hunting. Novosokolniki was granted town status in 1925.

On August 1, 1927, the uyezds and governorates were abolished and Novosokolnichesky District, with the administrative center in Novosokolniki, was established as a part of Velikiye Luki Okrug of Leningrad Oblast. It included parts of former Velikoluksky and Nevelsky Uyezds. On June 3, 1929, Novosokolnichesky District was transferred to Western Oblast. On July 23, 1930, the okrugs were also abolished and the districts were directly subordinated to the oblast. On January 29, 1935, Western Oblast was abolished and the district was transferred to Kalinin Oblast, and on February 5 of the same year, Novosokolnichesky District became a part of Velikiye Luki Okrug of Kalinin Oblast, one of the okrugs abutting the state boundaries of the Soviet Union. On May 4, 1938, the district was subordinated directly to the oblast. Between July 25, 1941 and January 29, 1944, Novosokolniki was occupied by German troops. On August 22, 1944, the district was transferred to newly established Velikiye Luki Oblast. On October 2, 1957, Velikiye Luki Oblast was abolished and Novosokolnichesky District was transferred to Pskov Oblast.

== Administrative and municipal status ==
Within the framework of administrative divisions, Novosokolniki serves as the administrative center of Novosokolnichesky District, to which it is directly subordinated. As a municipal division, the town of Novosokolniki is incorporated within Novosokolnichesky Municipal District as Novosokolniki Urban Settlement.

== Economy ==
=== Industry ===
Novosokolniki has enterprises of textile and food industries.

The Novosokolniki guyed TV mast is 360 meters (1,180 ft) tall and was built in 1995.

=== Transportation ===
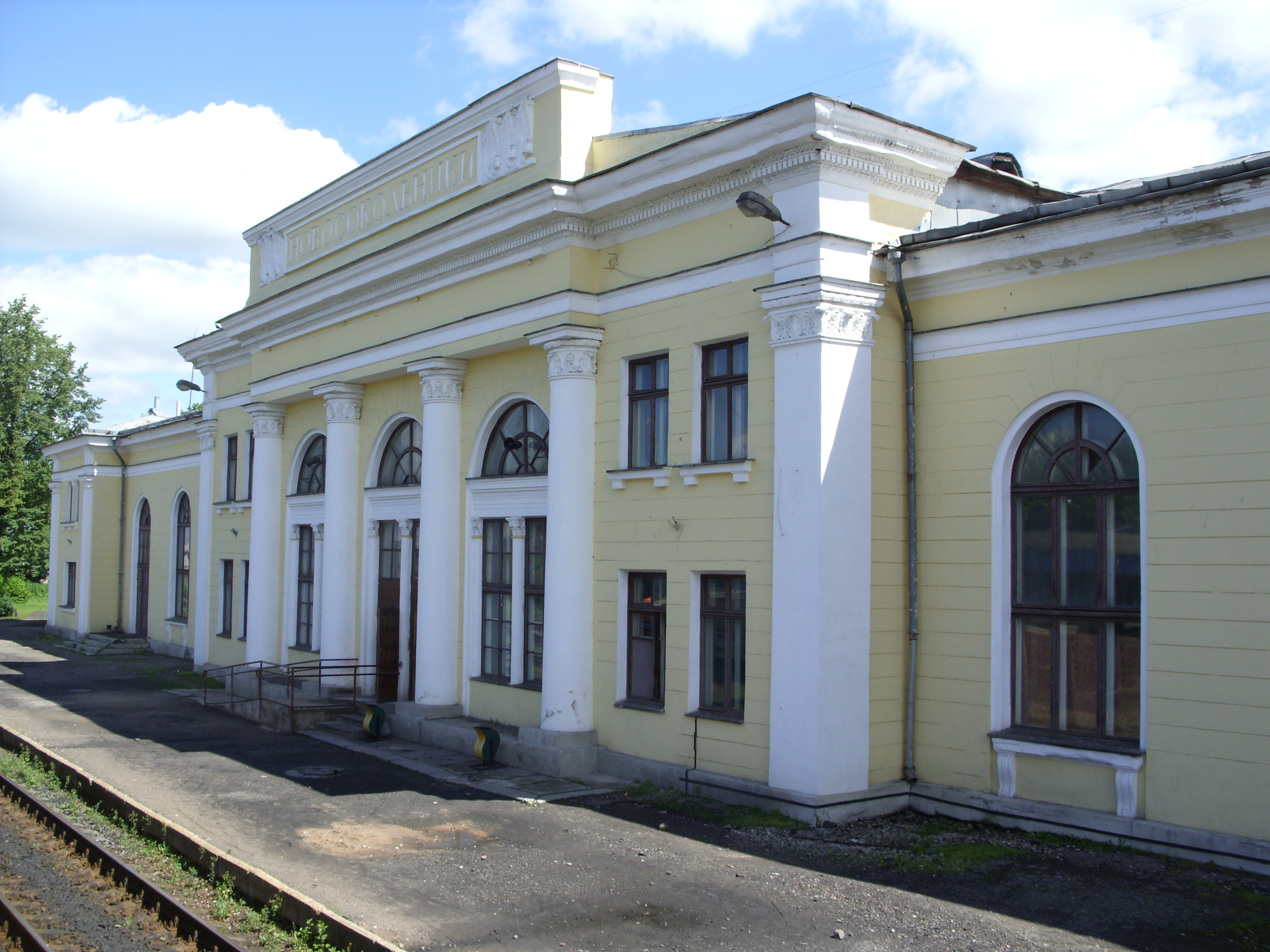
The railway station in Novosokolniki

Novosokolniki is an important railway hub, located at the crossing of two lines. One railway connects Moscow and Velikiye Luki with Riga and runs in the east–west direction. Another railway, running in the north–south direction, connects St. Petersburg and Dno with Nevel and Vitebsk. In Nevel, south of Novosokolniki, it splits into two railway lines, both running southeast into Belarus: one line to Vitebsk and another one to Grodno via Polotsk and Maladzyechna.

Novosokolniki has an easy access to the M9 Highway which connects Moscow and Riga. It is furthermore connected by roads with Velikiye Luki and Nevel. There are also local roads.

== Culture and recreation ==
Novosokolniki contains six objects classified as cultural and historical heritage of local significance. The monuments are the railway station, protected as the site of events of the Revolution of 1905, as well as monuments to soldiers fallen in World War II.
