= Velizhsky Uyezd =

Former administrative division

- Uezd of Russia
- 1772–1927
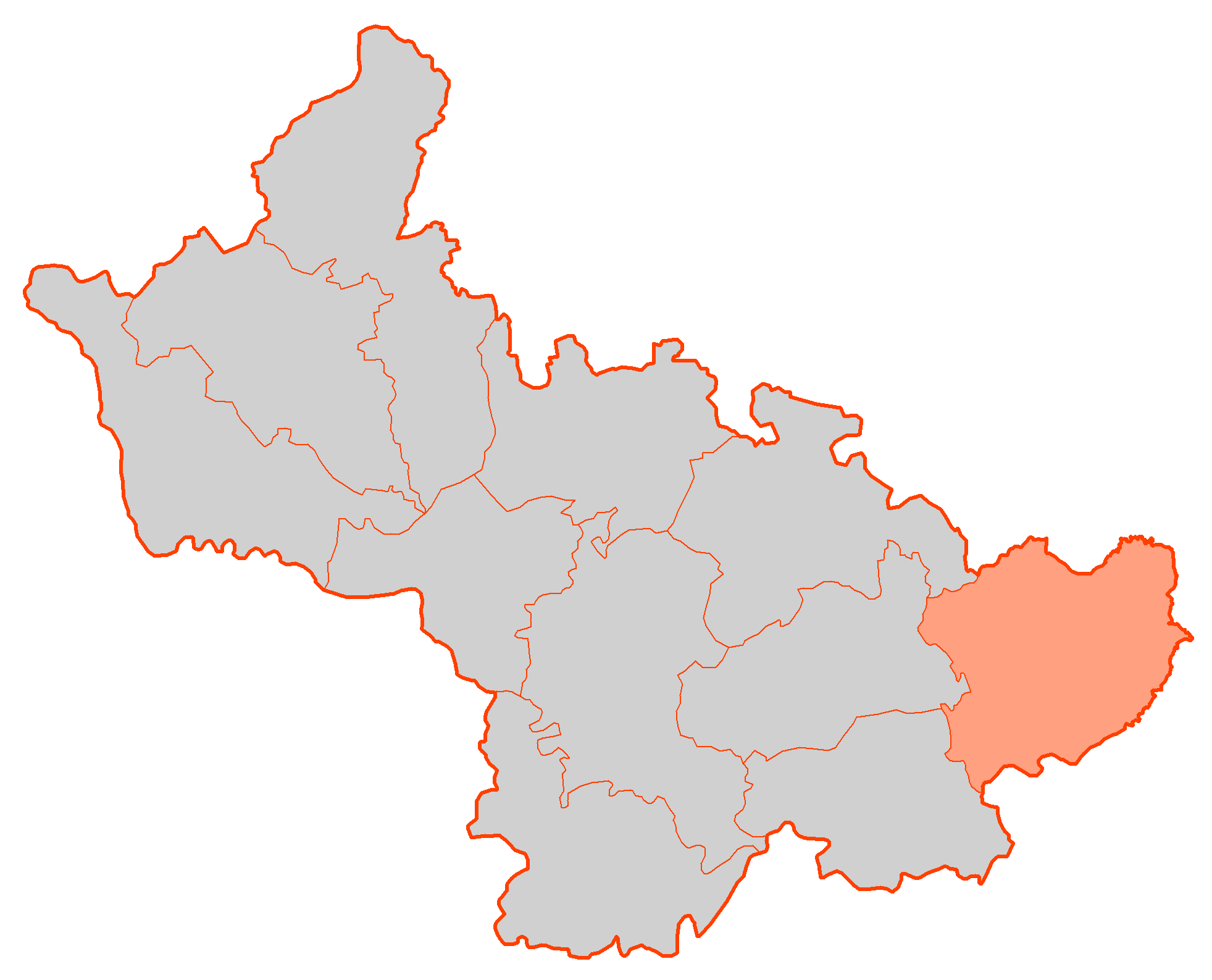
- Location in Vitebsk Governorate
- Capital: Velizh
- Population
  - 1897: 100,079
- History
  - Established: 1772
  - Disestablished: 1927
- Today part of: Russia

Velizhsky Uyezd (Велижский уезд) was one of the eleven subdivisions of the Vitebsk Governorate of the Russian Empire. It was situated in the southeastern part of the governorate. Its administrative centre was Velizh.

== Geography ==
The uyezd bordered the Nevelsky and Vitebsky uyezds in the west, the Pskov Governorate in the north, and the Smolensk Governorate in the east and south.

As of 1893, forests accounted for 47.6% of the district's area.

== History ==
The uyezd was formed in territories annexed by Russia in the First Partition of Poland.

== Demographics ==
Historical population
Year	Pop.	±%
1885	80,508	—
1897	100,079	+24.3%

At the time of the Russian Empire Census of 1897, Velizhsky Uyezd had a population of 100,079. Of these, 85.7% spoke Belarusian, 9.8% Yiddish, 2.5% Latvian, 1.3% Russian, 0.3% Polish, 0.1% German and 0.1% Romani as their native language.

As of 1870, 75.1% of the Jews lived in the district capital of Velizh, whereas 54 of 108, or 50%, of the major landowners were Poles.

== See also ==
- Category:People from Vitebsk Governorate
