= Sergey Yustinovich Bagotsky =

Russian revolutionary (1879–1953)

Sergey Bagotsky Сергей Багоцкий

Personal details
- Born: 15 February 1879 Opochka, Pskov Governorate, Russian Empire
- Died: March 15, 1953 (aged 74) Moscow, Soviet Union
- Party: Bolshevik, Communist
- Profession: medicine

Sergey Yustinovich Bagotsky (Russian: Серге́й Юсти́нович Баго́цкий; 15 February 1879 – 15 March 1953) was a Russian Marxist revolutionary and Soviet medicine and Red Cross diplomat, Soviet head of the Red Cross representative mission to Geneva from 1918 to 1936.

== Early life ==
Bagotsky was born in Opochka, Pskov Governorate in 1879 to a merchant's family. His father and mother were Polish by birth.

== Political activity ==
He joined the Russian Social Democratic Labour Party (RSDLP) in 1902 and supported its Bolshevik faction when the party split into Bolsheviks and Mensheviks at its Second Congress in 1903. Bagotsky worked as a Bolshevik agent in Moscow and Saint Petersburg and played an active role in the Russian Revolution of 1905.

Bagotsky supported Bolshevik leader Vladimir Lenin in his struggle with Alexander Bogdanov for the leadership of the Bolshevik faction in 1908–1909 and voted to expel Bogdanov at the June 1909 mini-conference in Paris. Bagotsky was with Lenin in Kraków and followed Lenin from Kraków to Switzerland. When in Switzerland, Bagotsky became one of Lenin's closest supporters and helped him on a daily basis in practical terms.

After the revolution, Bagotsky stayed in Switzerland and was made into the Head of the Russian Red Cross representative mission in Geneva. In this capacity, he pursued contacts with the International Red Cross in Geneva.

Since diplomatic relations between Russia and Switzerland were severed in 1918, Bagotsky, who stayed as the Russian Red Cross representative until 1936, acted as an unofficial Soviet Ambassador to Switzerland, maintaining the necessary contacts between the two states.

Bagotsky wrote and published memoirs about his meetings with Lenin in Poland and Switzerland.
