= Opochka =

Town in Pskov Oblast, Russia

Opochka Опочка
- Town
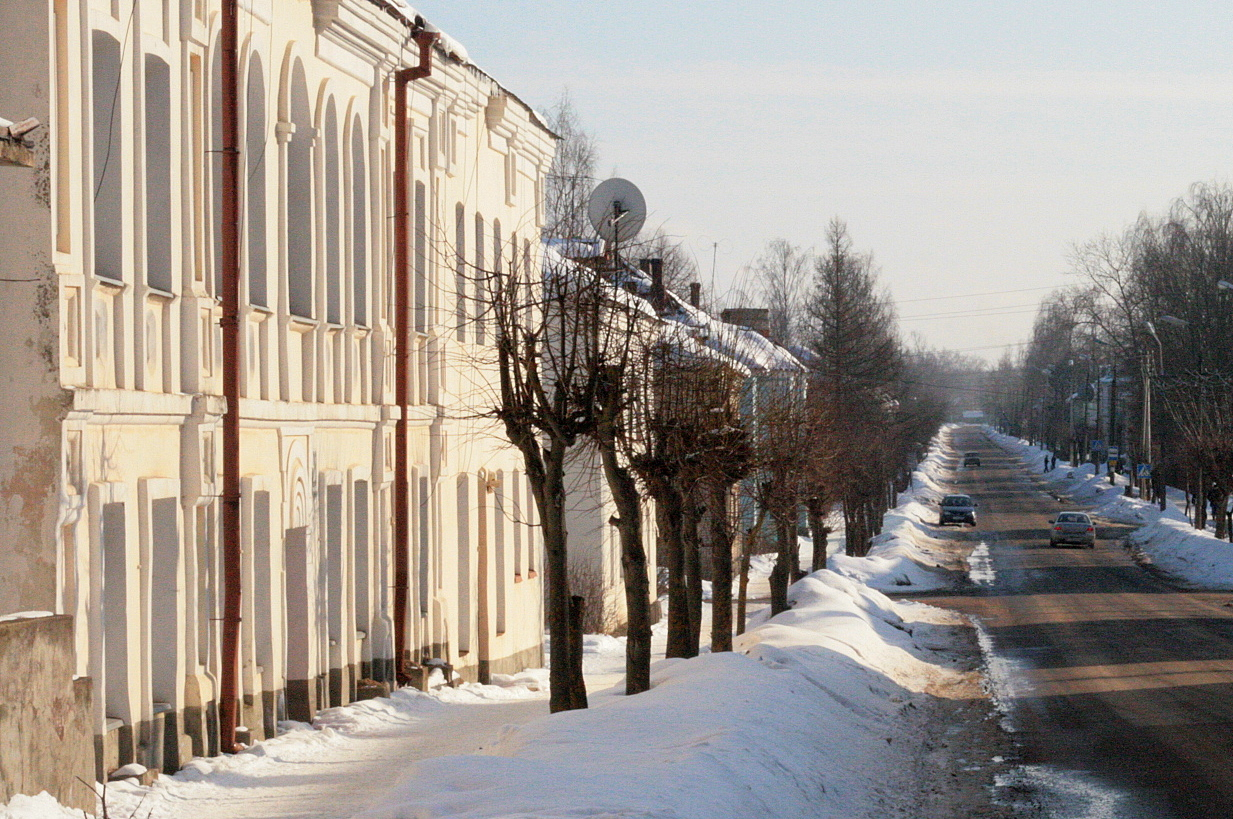
- Lenina Street in Opochka

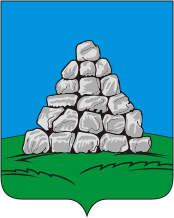
- Coat of arms
- Interactive map of Opochka
- Location of Opochka Opochka (Pskov Oblast)
- Coordinates: 56°42′N 28°40′E
- Country: Russia
- Federal subject: Pskov Oblast
- Administrative district: Opochetsky District
- Founded: 1414
- Elevation: 90 m (300 ft)

Population (2010 Census)
  - Total: 11,603
  - Estimate (2021): 9,928 (−14.4%)

Administrative status
  - Capital of: Opochetsky District

Municipal status
  - Municipal district: Opochetsky Municipal District
  - Urban settlement: Opochka Urban Settlement
  - Capital of: Opochetsky Municipal District, Opochka Urban Settlement
- Time zone: UTC+3 (MSK)
- Postal codes: 182330, 182333
- OKTMO ID: 58629101001
- Website: www.opochka-daily.ru

Opochka (Russian: Опо́чка) is a town and the administrative center of Opochetsky District in Pskov Oblast, Russia, located on the Velikaya River, 130 kilometers (81 mi) south of Pskov, the administrative center of the oblast. Population: 9,928 (2021 census); 11,603 (2010 census); 13,964 (2002 census); 16,190 (1989 Soviet census).

== History ==
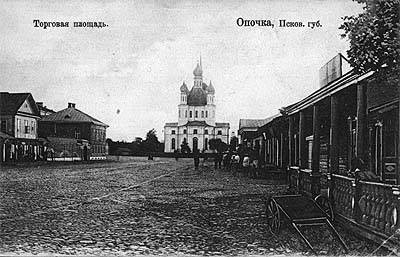
Market square on an old postcard

It was founded in 1414. At the time, it was a fortress subordinate to Pskov and protecting it from the south. In 1426, it was besieged by the Lithuanians, and in 1427 by Germans, but it was not conquered. It did, however, burn down in 1441. In 1510, the town was annexed by the Grand Duchy of Moscow, and from 1547 it was part of the Tsardom of Russia. In 1581, it was captured by Polish King Stephen Báthory.

In the course of the administrative reform carried out in 1708 by Peter the Great, it was included into Ingermanland Governorate (known since 1710 as Saint Petersburg Governorate). Opochka is specifically mentioned as one of the towns making the governorate. In 1727, separate Novgorod Governorate was split off, and in 1772, Pskov Governorate (which between 1777 and 1796 existed as Pskov Viceroyalty) was established. Between 1772 and 1776, Opochka was the seat of the governorate. In 1776, the borders of the governorate were considerably altered, the seat was relocated to Pskov, and Opochka became the seat of Opochetsky Uyezd. In the late 19th century, the town had ten industrial plants, including tanneries. Trade in linen, hides and grain was conducted.

On August 1, 1927, the uyezds and governorates were abolished and Opochetsky District, with the administrative center in Opochka, was established as a part of Pskov Okrug of Leningrad Oblast. It included parts of former Opochetsky and Sebezhsky Uyezds. On July 23, 1930, the okrugs were also abolished and the districts were directly subordinated to the oblast. On January 29, 1935, the district was transferred to Kalinin Oblast, and on February 5, Opochetsky District became a part of Velikiye Luki Okrug of Kalinin Oblast, one of the okrugs abutting the state boundaries of the Soviet Union. On May 11, 1937, Opochka Okrug with the administrative center in Opochka was established and the district was transferred to the okrug. On February 5, 1941, the okrug was abolished. Between July 8, 1941 and July 15, 1944, Opochka was occupied by German troops. The Germans operated a Sicherheitsdienst camp in the town. In March 1942, the local Jewish population was murdered during mass executions. On August 22, 1944, the district was transferred to newly established Velikiye Luki Oblast. On October 2, 1957, Velikiye Luki Oblast was abolished and Opochetsky District was transferred to Pskov Oblast.

== Administrative and municipal status ==
Within the framework of administrative divisions, Opochka serves as the administrative center of Opochetsky District, to which it is directly subordinated. As a municipal division, the town of Opochka is incorporated within Opochetsky Municipal District as Opochka Urban Settlement.

== Economy ==
=== Industry ===
There are enterprises of food and textile industries in Opochka.

=== Transportation ===
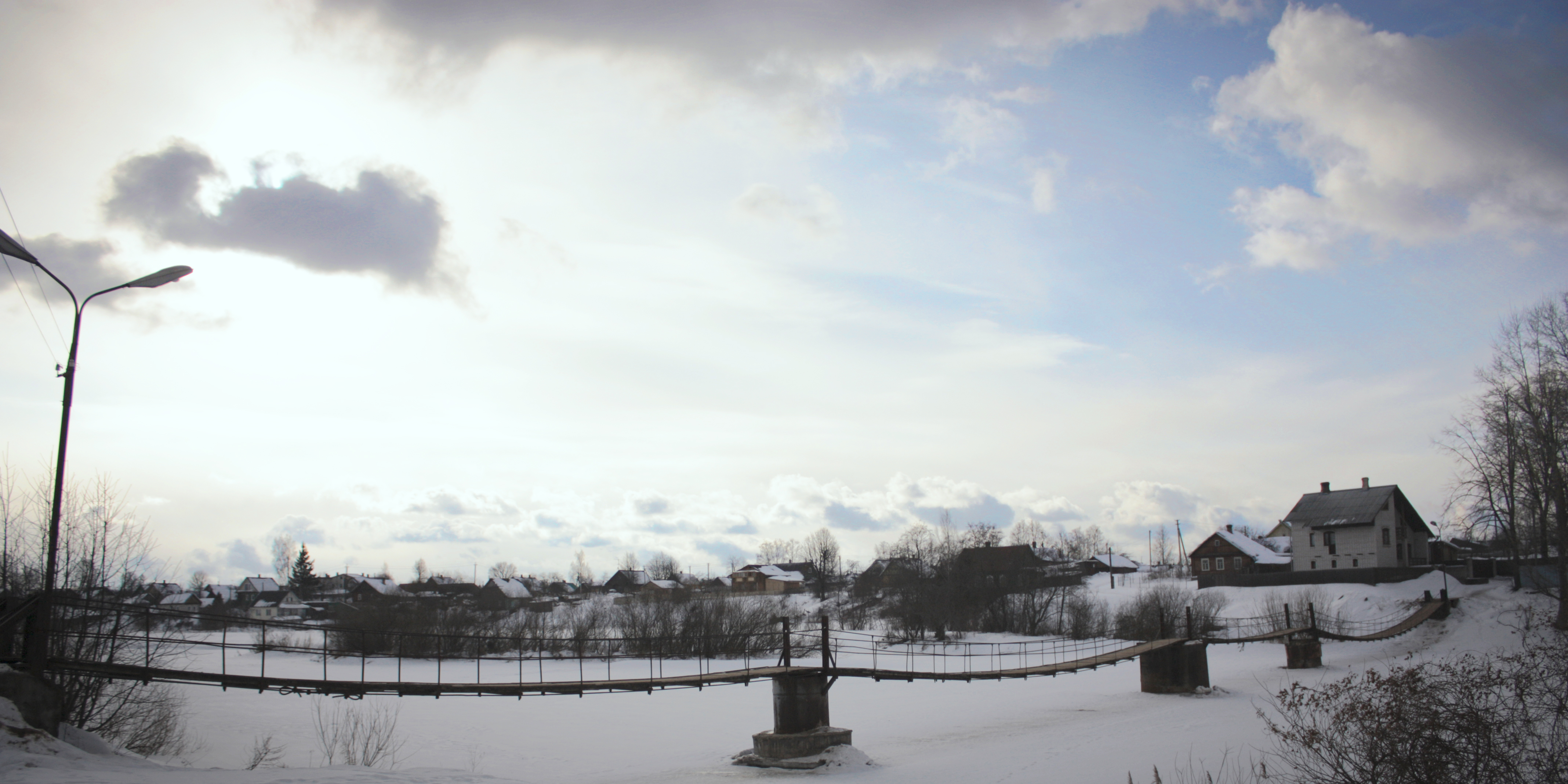
The suspended bridge over the Velikaya River

The M20 Highway, which connects St. Petersburg and Vitebsk via Pskov, passes Opochka. Another road connects Opochka with Sebezh. There are also local roads.

== Culture and recreation ==
Opochka contains five cultural heritage monuments of federal significance and additionally thirty-four objects classified as cultural and historical heritage of local significance. The federally protected monuments are the Intercession Church, the postal station, the Kukolkin House, and the Chernyshyov House, as well as an archeological site.

== Notable people ==
Opochka is the birthplace of architect Lev Rudnev and geologist Nikolai Kudryavtsev.

- Sergey Yustinovich Bagotsky (1879–1953), Russian Marxist revolutionary, Soviet medicine and Red Cross diplomat
