= Lubomir Dymsha =

Russian lawyer and politician (1860–1915)

Dymsha Lubomir. Deputy of the 4th Duma, 1913
- Lubomyr Dymsza
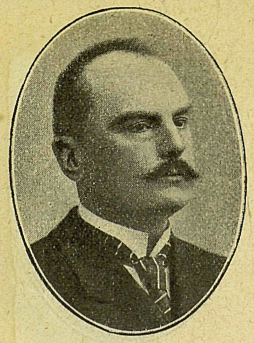

Personal details
- Born: 6 January 1860
- Died: 18 November 1915 (aged 55)
- Citizenship: Russian Empire
- Party: Polish colo
- Profession: Lawyer, deputy of the State Duma of the Russian Empire of the III convocation and State Duma of the Russian Empire of the IV convocation

Lyubomir Kleofasovich (Petrovich) Dymsha (Russian: Любоми́р Клеофа́сович (Петро́вич) Ды́мша 1860–1915) – a lawyer, a member of the State Duma of the Russian Empire from Siedlce Governorate. Pole, Roman Catholic faith, hereditary nobleman of the Kovno Governorate, State Counselor.

== Biography ==
He was born on January 6, 1860. Son of Cleophas Petrovich Dymshi (1821–1907) and Teresa Dimshene, a neuter Gorskiite (1829–1902). He had four brothers: Eugeniusz (1853–1918), Henryh Kleofasovich Dymsha(1856–1918) – member of the State Duma of the Russian Empire II convocation from Vitebsk province, Eustace (1860–1890), Jozef or Juozapas (Józef, Juozapas, 1860–1917).

In 1878 he graduated from the German grammar school in Mitau with a gold medal, and in 1882 from the Law Faculty of the St. Petersburg University. He served in the Ministry of Education; in 1889, passed the exam at the Moscow University for a master's degree in public law, was approved in 1890 in the rank of privat-docent of the St. Petersburg University and in 1891 was sent to Sweden and Norway to study local government. In 1893, as a representative of the Ministry of Public Education, he attended the World Congress of Higher Education in Chicago. In November 1893, he was appointed to serve in the State Chancellery, in the legislative part, in the Department of Economy.

In 1896 he lectured as a private lecturer in the Department of State Law of the St. Petersburg University on local government in Great Britain, France and Prussia, then – the course of general and Russian state law (until 1911). In 1902 he defended his thesis "State Law in Sweden" at the Kazan University and was awarded a master's degree in public law.

In 1902–1905 – a vowel of the St. Petersburg City Duma, since 1905 – a friend of the chairman of the Duma. Participated in the scientific and cultural life of the Polish colony in St. Petersburg; member of a number of public, religious and other Polish organizations.

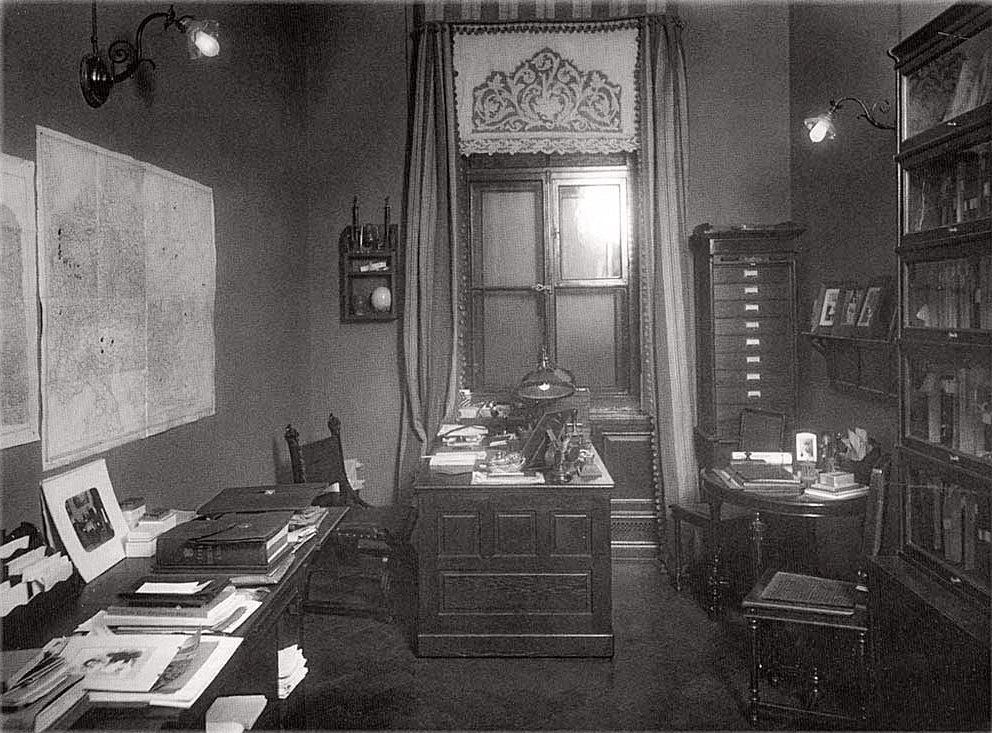
The office of the lawyer Lubomir Dymshi at the address: St. Petersburg, Mokhovaya St., 27-29. Photo by K. Bulla

He taught at the law faculty of Highest women's historical and literary courses of N. P. Raev.

In 1907 he was elected to the Third State Duma from the general electors of the Siedlce Gubernia Electoral Assembly: he was a member of the Polish colo; participated in the debate on the budget, criticizing government policy regarding the Kingdom of Poland; raised the issue of discrimination of Congress Poland in their cases in courts, demanding the achievement of full equality. In the third Duma was part of the commission: administrative and for judicial reform (comrade chairman). In 1912 he was elected to the Fourth State Duma.

The landowner of the Sedlecki and Kovensk provinces (about 2000 acres of land). In 1914 he founded the Polish Society of Lawyers and Economists in St. Petersburg, and was a member of the Board of the Russian-Belgian Metallurgical Society. He collaborated in the Polish newspapers "The Polish Voice" (1913), and "The Polish Affair" (1915).

Dymsha died on November 18, 1915.

== Family ==
- Wife – Sofia Dymshene, born Kerbedytė (1871–1963)
- Daughter – Sofia Dymshaite in the marriage Bulgak-Gelskiene (1902–2004)

== Compositions ==
- State wine monopoly and its importance for combating drunkenness: Dokl. Komis. on the issue of alcoholism – SPb .: Type. PP Sojkina, 1899. - 24 p.
- State law of Sweden. Part historical. T. 1 – SPb .: Type. P. P. Soykin, 1901. - 424 p.
- The theory of separation of powers
- Local government in Sweden
- Community device in Norway
- A new form of zemstvo economy
- The national question in the 20th century
- The Holm question. - St. Petersburg, 1910 (in Polish, Warsaw, 1911)
