= Sebezhsky Uyezd =

Former administrative division

- Uezd of Russia
- 1772–1927
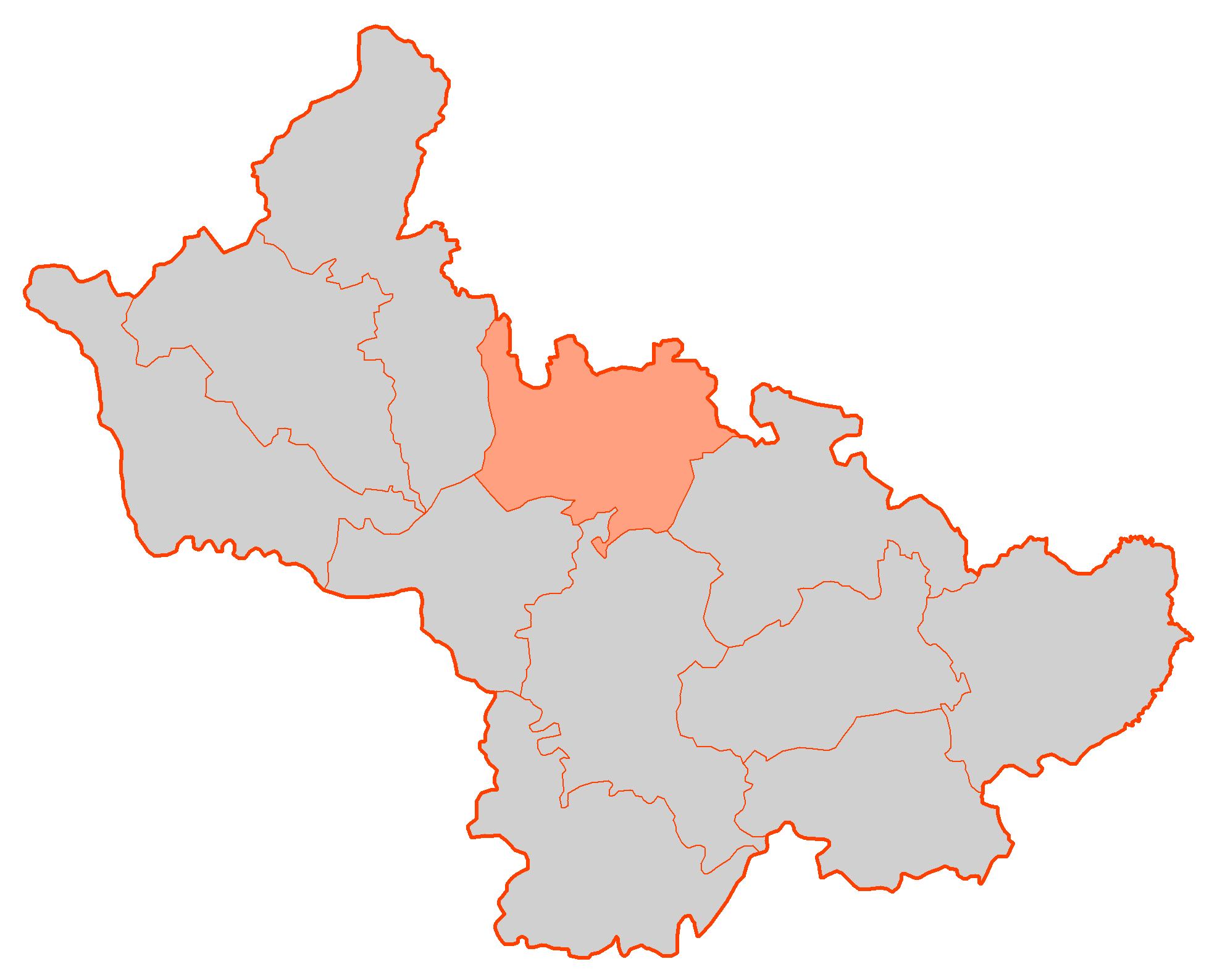
- Location in Vitebsk Governorate
- Capital: Sebezh
- Population
  - 1897: 92,055
- History
  - Established: 1772
  - Disestablished: 1927
- Today part of: Russia

Sebezhsky Uyezd (Себежский уезд) was one of the eleven subdivisions of the Vitebsk Governorate of the Russian Empire. It was situated in the central part of the governorate. Its administrative centre was Sebezh.

== Geography ==
The uyezd bordered the Lyutsinsky Uyezd in the west, Nevelsky Uyezd in the east, Drissensky and Polotsky uyezds in the south, and the Pskov Governorate in the north.

As of 1867, forests accounted for 45% of the district's area.

== History ==
The uyezd was formed in territories annexed by Russia in the First Partition of Poland.

== Demographics ==
Historical population
Year	Pop.	±%
1886	79,122	—
1897	92,055	+16.3%

At the time of the Russian Empire Census of 1897, Sebezhsky Uyezd had a population of 92,055. Of these, 47.1% spoke Russian, 47.1% Belarusian, 3.8% Yiddish, 1.5% Polish, 0.1% German, 0.1% Romani and 0.1% Lithuanian as their native language.

== See also ==
- Category:People from Vitebsk Governorate
