= Henry Dymsha =

Politician (1856–1918)

Dymsha Heinrich Kleofasovich
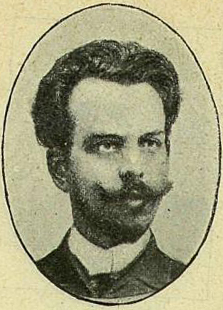
- Henryk Dymsza, member of the second Russian State Duma, 1907
- Born: Henryk Zygmunt Stanisław Dymsza; 1856; Estate of Rushoni, Kapinsky Volost, Dvinsky District
- Died: 1918 (aged 61–62); Independence, Missouri, United States
- Occupations: Landowner and deputy of the state duma of the ii convocation from vitebsk province
- Political party: Polish colo

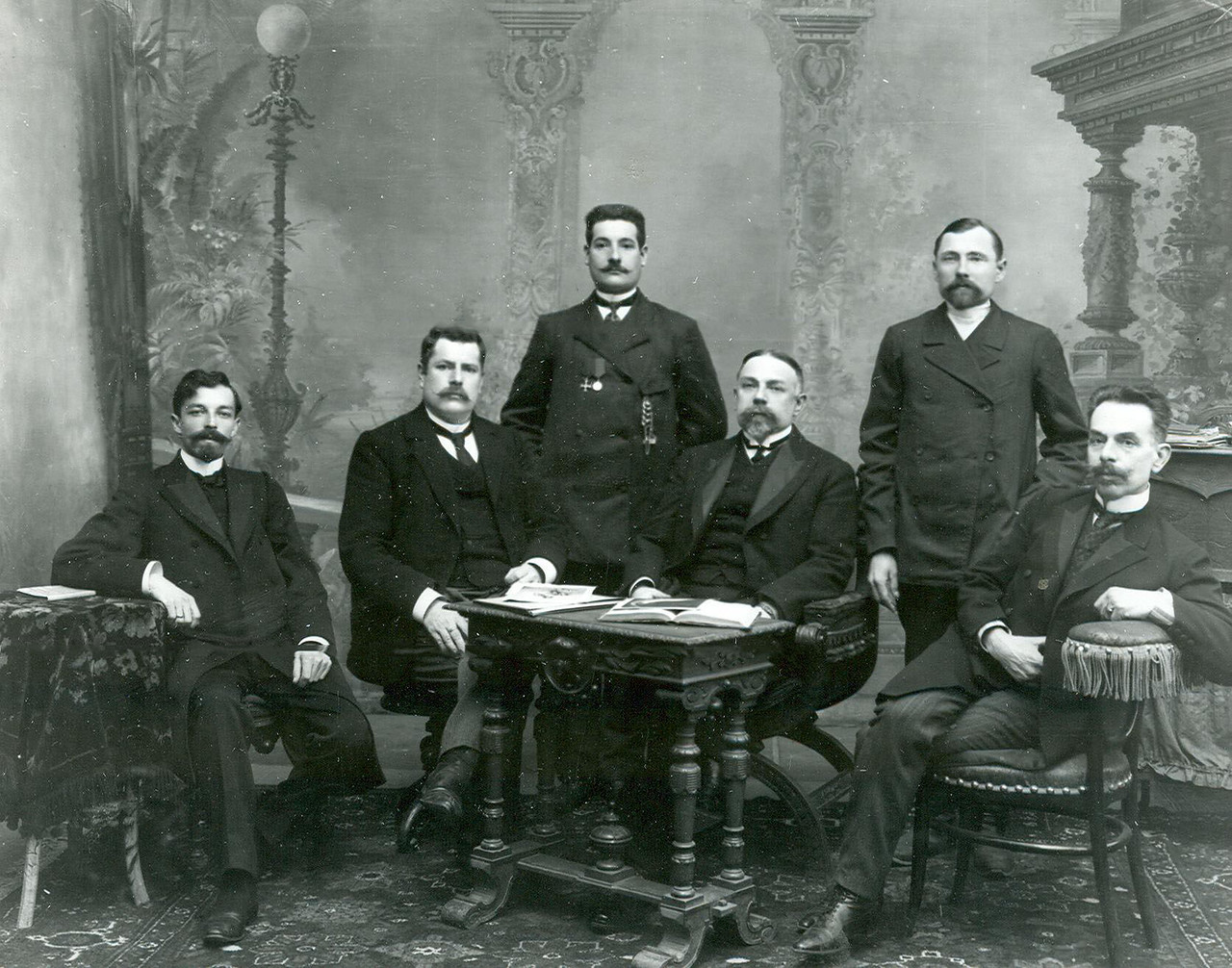
Deputies State Duma of the II convocation from Vitebsk province: sit: (from left to right) A. V. Burmeister, A. Kazir, M. Benislavsky, GK Dymsh, stand: F. I. Petrochenko, E. P. Bykov

Heinrich Kleofasovich Dymsha (Russian: Ге́нрих Клеофа́сович Ды́мша; 1856 Rushoni Kapinsky volost Vitebsk Governorate – September 1918) was a Polish landowner and deputy of the State Duma of the II convocation from Vitebsk Governorate.

He was the brother of Lubomir Dymsha, a deputy of the State Duma from Sedletskaya guberniya.

== Biography ==
Polish nobleman. The son of Cleophas Petrovich Dymshi (1821–1907) and Teresa Dymshene, a born Gorskiite (1829–1902). Graduate of the Faculty of Medicine, University of Warsaw, graduated with the rank of a healer. Owned land and led agriculture in his estate Rushoni Kapinsky volost Dvinsky Uyezd Vitebsk Governorate.

6 February 1907 elected to the State Duma of the II convocation of the general electors of the Vitebsk Governorate election assembly. In the Duma sources it is defined as "the people's democrat", that is, belonged to the Polish National-Democratic Party. According to one information, he became a member of the Polish colo; however, according to others, he was in the group of the Western Outskirts and even was part of its leadership. He went to the Duma Agricultural Commission.

In 1908, he was included in the Golden Book of the Russian Empire "The Figures of Russia," containing 130 names of the largest Russian philanthropists.

In 1917 he participated in the elections to the All-Russian Constituent Assembly under list No. 10 from the united Polish organizations in the Vitebsk constituency.

Further fate is not known in detail. He died in September 1918.

== Family ==
- First wife – Maria Dymshene, born Bielskyite (Bielskytė) emblem of Elita (1861–1889)
- The second wife – Maria Dymshene, born Zholadz (Žoladž) (born 1860)
  - Son – Tadeusz Dymsha (1892–1983)
  - Daughter – Maria Dimshaite in the marriage Zaborovskien (1896–1949)
- Brother – Eugeniusch (1853–1918)
- Brother – Lubomyr (1859–1915) a lawyer, a member of the State Duma of the III and IV convocations of the Siedlce Governorate.
- Brother – Eustace (1860–1890)
- Brother – Jozef (Józef Juozapas, 1860–1917)

=== Archives ===
- Russian State Historical Archive. Fund 1278. Inventory 1 (2nd convocation). Case 140. Case 529. Sheet 5.
