= Fyodor Makhnov =

Russian giant

Feodor Andreevich Makhnov
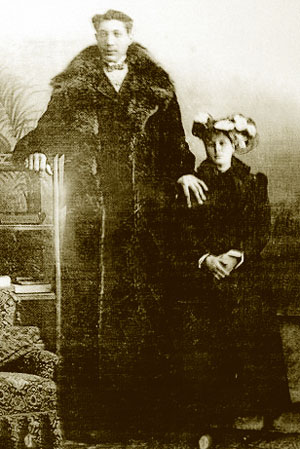
- Feodor Andreevich Makhnov
- Born: 18 June 1878; Kostyuki, Vitebsky Uyezd, Russian Empire
- Died: 28 August 1912 (aged 34); Kostyuki, Vitebsk Governorate
- Citizenship: Russian Empire
- Known for: Tall man/person "The Russian Giant"
- Height: (Unconfirmed) 282 cm (9 ft 3 in) or 285 cm (9 ft 4 in) around 239 cm (7 ft 10 in)

Fyodor Andreevich Makhnov (Russian: Фёдор Андре́евич Махно́в, also written as Feodor Machnow in contemporary sources) claimed to be the tallest person in the world, although his exact height and weight is unconfirmed.

== Biography ==
Fyodor Makhnov was born in 1878 at a khutor near the village of Kostyuki Vitebsky Uyezd, then part of the Russian Empire (now in Belarus) to a poor peasant family.

As a young man in his twenties he toured Europe to exhibit his great height. After having spent time in Berlin he visited London in 1905 where he joined the Hippodrome accompanied by his wife and young child. He then toured the United States in 1906 where he met President Roosevelt as well as actor and fellow giant George Auger. (Note: Auger's height is also disputed, with claims ranging anywhere from 226 to 257 cm (7 ft 5 in to 8 ft 5 in).) Throughout his tour his promoters exaggerated his height, and he was usually accredited with a considerably inflated stature as high as 9 feet 3 inches (282 cm) and billed as "The Russian Giant." On the obelisk it is still possible to read: «Фёдор Андреевич Махнов. Родился 6 июня 1878 года. Умер 28 августа 1912 года. Самый высокий человек в мире. Ростом был 3 аршина 9 вершков» ("Fyodor Andreevich Makhnov. Born 6 June 1878. Died 28 August 1912. The tallest man in the world. His height was 3 arshins 9 vershoks [254 centimetres] tall"). Makhnov's wife, Efrosinya wanted to correct the incorrect figure on the monument, but could not do so because of the beginning of the First World War and then the Revolution of 1917.

Photographic evidence suggest that he was not any taller than 7 feet 10 1/2 inches (240.0 cm). This exaggeration may have been because he wore high hats, and tall boots which added a foot to his height. Although, if this was accurate, he would have been taller than Robert Wadlow, now cited as the world's tallest man.

Makhnov died in 1912 due to pneumonia, and likely complications of acromegaly. He was the father of four children, none of whom reached a height greater than two meters.

== See also ==
- List of tallest people
- Alexander Sizonenko
- Angus MacAskill
- Igor Ladan
- Leonid Stadnyk
- Nikolay Valuev
- Robert Wadlow
