= Ottomar Gern =

Russian fortification engineer (1827–1882)

- Konstantin Borisovich Gern
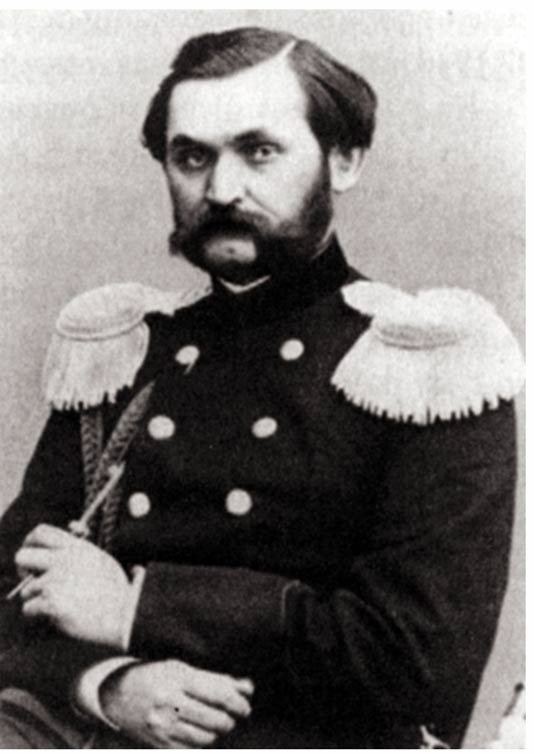
- Born: 16 November 1827; Vitebsk Governorate, Russia
- Died: 9 November 1882 (aged 54); Menton, France
- Burial place: Moscow
- Military career
- Allegiance: Russia
- Rank: Lieutenant-General

Ottomar Borisovich Gern (Russian: Оттомар Борисович Герн; 16 November 1827 – 9 November 1882) was a Russian fortification engineer. Gern was born to a Polish noble family of German origin in Vitebsk Governorate, Russia. He studied war engineering at school and later became a lecturer in the field of construction of fortifications.

During the Crimean War in 1854, Gern was sent to Tallinn to organise better protection for batteries. Gern built four submarines during his life. After the Franco-Prussian War (1870–1871), he made a comprehensive presentation of the protective construction operations of both sides. He was awarded the rank of Lieutenant-General.

== Career ==
In summer 1854, Gern arrived in Tallinn to strengthen the local defence facilities. After a couple of months, the Crimean War (1853–1856) had reached a point where the British and French allies of Turkey has reached the Gulf of Finland, and Russia announced a naval blockade. The British warships were stationed near Naissaar, blocking the exit route from Tallinn. Artillery fire from the shore could not reach them. To resolve this situation, Gern came up with the idea of constructing a submarine, which could reach enemy ships undetected and attack them unexpectedly. Gern got approval for his project and the first submarine was constructed in Tallinn in summer 1854. There were no large shipyards there at the time, so Gern had to do with the options available. In early autumn, the Tallinn military shipyard constructed a 5-metre wooden submarine. It had a crew of four. The weapon to attack enemy ships was located at the forward end.

The following year a second design was constructed by K. & A. Frikke shipyard in St. Petersburg. The second submarine was propelled by muscle power and displaced 8 tons. A third design displacing 10 tons and powered by a petrol engine was constructed by Izhorskiy yard in Kolpino in 1864. Both designs carried a submarine mine as armament.

Gern's fourth design was a steam-powered submarine, the first to be armed with a self-propelled torpedo. No.4 was constructed by I. F. Alexandrovskiy shipyard in St. Petersburg in 1864–1867. The 12 m (39 ft 4 in) long boat was launched in October 1867. In August 1871 the 25-ton boat was subjected to trials by the Imperial Russian war ministry. Although successful, the project was abandoned in 1872 after the war ministry had lost interest.

In 1872, Gern presented a 6-ton torpedo, powered by a compressed-air engine, but tests showed only modest results. According to Edwyn Gray, this was "the largest and heaviest torpedo ever built".

Gern died on 9 November 1882, in Menton, France, and was buried in Moscow.
