= Drissensky Uyezd =

Historical subdivision of Vitebsk Governate of Russian Empire

Drissensky Uyezd (Дриссенский уезд) was one of the eleven subdivisions of the Vitebsk Governorate of the Russian Empire. It was situated in the central part of the governorate. Its administrative centre was Drysa (Drissa).

== Demographics ==
At the time of the Russian Empire Census of 1897, Drissensky Uyezd had a population of 97,083. Of these, 86.2% spoke Belarusian, 9.1% Yiddish, 2.4% Polish, 1.6% Russian, 0.4% Latvian and 0.3% German as their native language.

== See also ==
- Category:People from Vitebsk Governorate
