= Helianthus annuus 'Russian Giant' =

Sunflower cultivar

Helianthus annuus 'Russian Giant' is a cultivar of sunflower in the family Asteraceae. It is an annual.

== Characteristics ==
It grows up to 2.5 – 4 meters in height within a year. It has heart-shaped or oval, hairy green leaves. They bloom in the summer with a disk that is 12 inches or 30 centimeters in diameter and has a brown color in appearance.

== Cultivation ==
Helianthus annuus 'Russian Giant' can grow in a neutral to alkaline, well-drained moisture, rich in humus, and moderately fertile soil exposed to full sun. A cane might be needed to support the weight of the bloom. It is susceptible to diseases such as sclerotinia diseases and powdery mildews, along with pests such as slugs and snails. Germination takes about 7 – 14 days. Its seeds are considered to be edible.

== History ==
Helianthus annuus 'Russian Giant' was bred by Russian peasants for its staple food, sunflower seeds.
