= Naphtali Friedman =

Lithuanian politician (1863–1921)

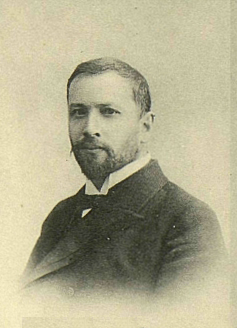
Friedman in 1913

Naphtali Friedman (sometimes also spelled Naftali; Russian: Нафтали Ма́ркович Фри́дман 15 May 1863, Juodžiai, Kovno Governorate – 5 May 1921) was a Jewish Lithuanian lawyer and politician.

He was elected as a Russian Constitutional Democratic Party deputy representing Kovno Governorate to the Third (1907–1912, out of 2 Jewish deputies) and Fourth (1912–1917, out of 3 Jewish deputies) State Duma. In 1914, he made a speech in which he said that the Jews would fight until the victory of the Russian Empire was achieved. He was also elected on April 19, 1920 to the Constituent Assembly of Lithuania on a common Jewish ticket and died on 5 May 1921.
