= Ludza county =

17th–20th century county in Latvia

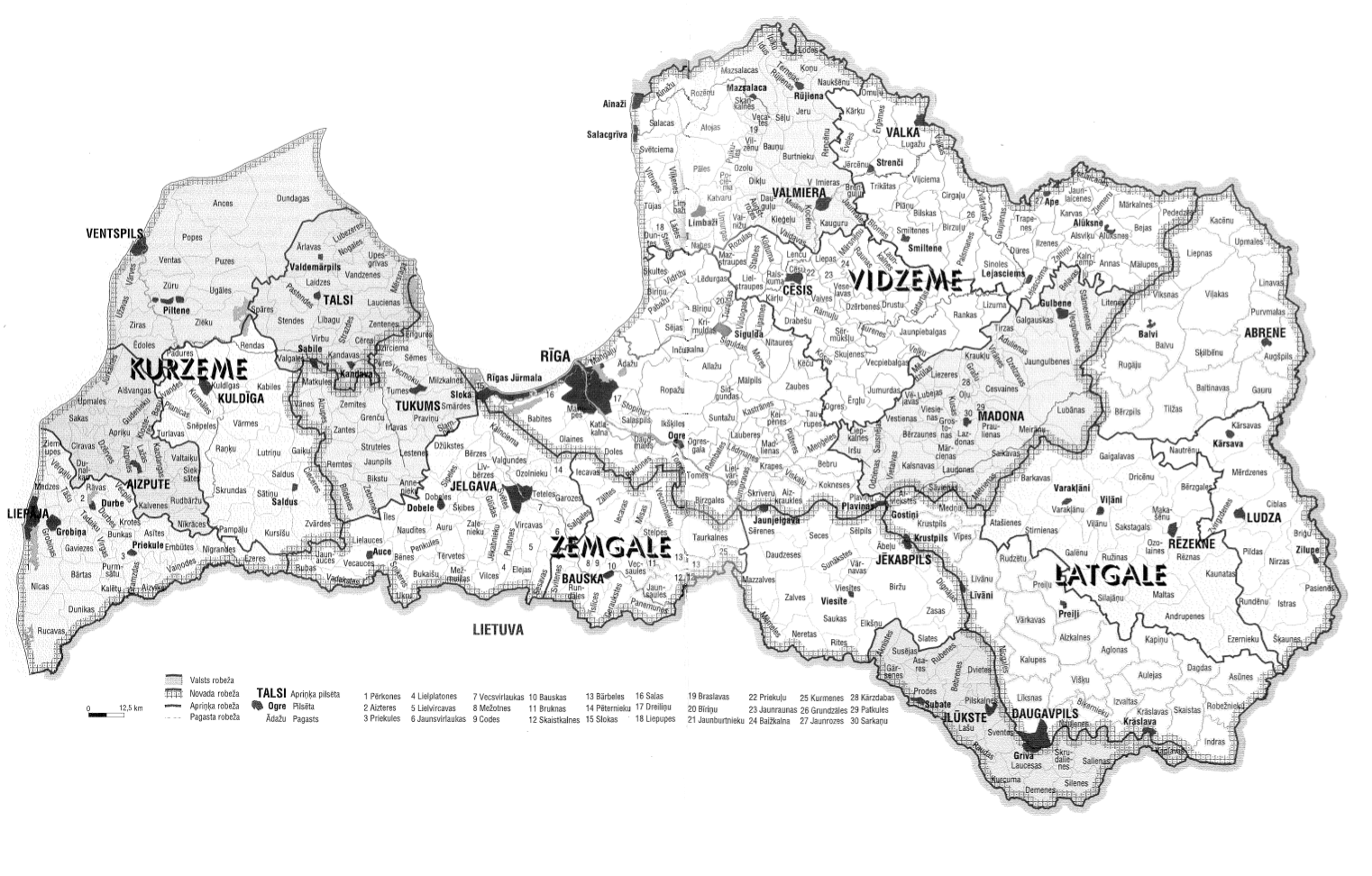
Ludzas apriņķis on the map of Latvia (1938)

Ludza county (Latvian: Ludzas apriņķis) was a historic county in the Vitebsk Governorate, and in the Republic of Latvia dissolved during the administrative territorial reform of the Latvian SSR in 1949. Its administrative centre was Ludza.

== History ==
Coat of arms

Established in 1629 as one of the four subdivisions (starostwo) of the Inflanty Voivodeship (Polish: trakt lucyński). In 1772, after the First Partition of Poland it became one of uyezds of Polotsk Governorate (Russian: Люцинский уезд, 1776—1796), later Belarusian Governorate (1796—1802) and Vitebsk Governorate (1802—1917) of the Russian Empire. On 31 December 1917 Lyutsinsky Uyezd, populated mostly by Latvians were transferred to Governorate of Livonia, becoming a part of the Latvian Soviet autonomy of Iskolat and a part of the Latvian Socialist Soviet Republic on 17 December 1918. After signing of the Latvian–Soviet Peace Treaty, Ludzas apriņķis was incorporated into the Republic of Latvia.

In 1949, Ludzas apriņķis was transformed to the Ludza district (Ludzas rajons) of the Latvian SSR.

== Demographics ==
At the time of the Russian Empire Census of 1897, Lyutsinsky Uyezd had a population of 128,155. Of these, 64.2% spoke Latvian, 20.5% Belarusian, 7.1% Russian, 4.9% Yiddish, 2.2% Polish, 0.4% Estonian, 0.2% German, 0.2% Lithuanian and 0.1% Finnish as their native language.
