= Nevelsky Uyezd =

Former administrative division

- Uezd of Russia
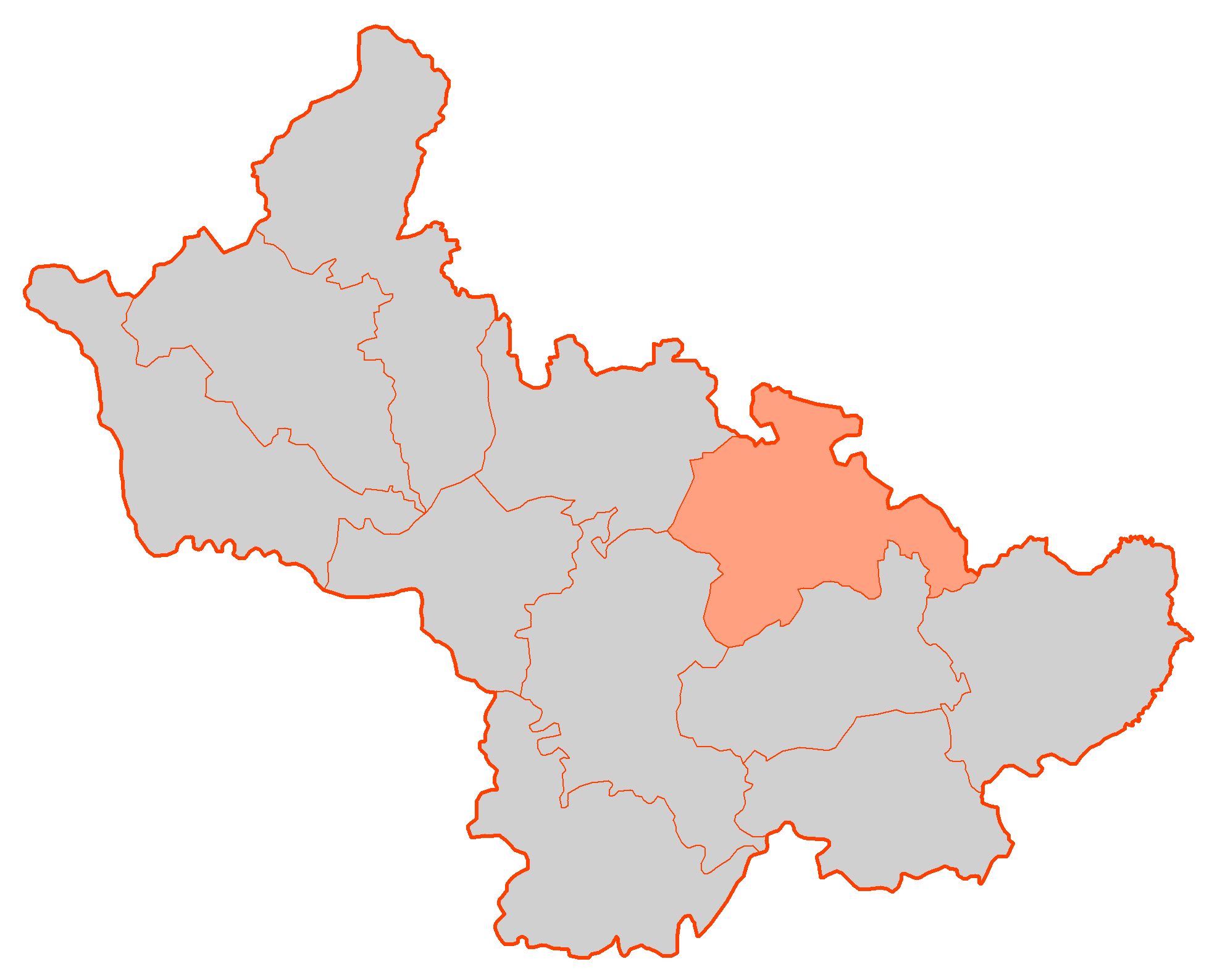
- Location in Vitebsk Governorate
- Capital: Nevel
- Population
  - 1897: 110,394
- Today part of: Russia

Nevelsky Uyezd (Невельский уезд) was one of the eleven subdivisions of the Vitebsk Governorate of the Russian Empire. It was situated in the eastern part of the governorate. Its administrative centre was Nevel.

Today, it roughly corresponds to the Nevelsk district of Pskov Oblast.

== Geography ==
The uyezd bordered the Polotsky and Sebezhsky uyezds in the west, Velizhsky Uyezd in the east, Gorodoksky Uyezd in the south, and the Pskov Governorate in the north.

As of 1886, forests accounted for 43.6% of the district's area, and arable land accounted for 28.9%.

== History ==
The uyezd was formed in territories annexed by Russia in the First Partition of Poland.

== Demographics ==
At the time of the Russian Empire Census of 1897, Nevelsky Uyezd had a population of 110,394. Of these, 84.0% spoke Belarusian, 7.4% Yiddish, 7.1% Russian, 0.6% Finnish, 0.3% Polish, 0.2% Estonian, 0.2% Romani, 0.1% German and 0.1% Latvian as their native language.

== See also ==
- Category:People from Vitebsk Governorate
- Nevelsky District, Pskov Oblast
