= Gorodoksky Uyezd =

Subdivision of Vitebsk governorate, Russia

Gorodoksky Uyezd (Городокский уезд) was one of the subdivisions of the Vitebsk Governorate of the Russian Empire. It was situated in the southeastern part of the governorate. Its administrative centre was Haradok (Gorodok).

== Demographics ==
At the time of the Russian Empire Census of 1897, Gorodoksky Uyezd had a population of 112,033. Of these, 83.6% spoke Belarusian, 10.7% Russian, 4.7% Yiddish, 0.5% Latvian, 0.4% Polish, 0.1% German and 0.1% Romani as their native language.
