= Vitebsky Uyezd =

Vitebsky Uyezd (Витебский уезд) was one of the subdivisions of the Vitebsk Governorate of the Russian Empire. It was situated in the southeastern part of the governorate. Its administrative centre was Vitebsk.

== Demographics ==
At the time of the Russian Empire Census of 1897, Vitebsky Uyezd had a population of 177,432. Of these, 51.1% spoke Belarusian, 22.3% Yiddish, 20.1% Russian, 3.2% Polish, 2.2% Latvian, 0.7% German, 0.2% Lithuanian, 0.1% Romani and 0.1% Ukrainian as their native language.

== See also ==
- Category:People from Vitebsk Governorate
