= Opochetsky Uyezd =

Opochetsky Uyezd (Опочецкий уезд) was one of the subdivisions of the Pskov Governorate of the Russian Empire. It was situated in the western part of the governorate. Its administrative centre was Opochka.

== Demographics ==
At the time of the Russian Empire Census of 1897, Opochetsky Uyezd had a population of 135,654. Of these, 98.5% spoke Russian, 0.5% Yiddish, 0.3% Polish, 0.2% German, 0.2% Latvian, 0.2% Estonian and 0.1% Finnish as their native language.
