= Polotsky Uyezd =

Polotsky Uyezd (Полоцкий уезд) was one of the eleven subdivisions of the Vitebsk Governorate of the Russian Empire. It was situated in the central part of the governorate. Its administrative centre was Polotsk.

== Demographics ==
At the time of the Russian Empire Census of 1897, Polotsky Uyezd had a population of 141,841. Of these, 73.1% spoke Belarusian, 12.1% Yiddish, 11.1% Russian, 2.0% Polish, 1.2% Latvian, 0.2% German, 0.2% Lithuanian and 0.1% Romani as their native language.

== See also ==
- Category:People from Vitebsk Governorate
