= Vitebsk Governorate =

1802–1924 unit of Russia

Coordinates: 55°11′N 30°10′E

Vitebsk Governorate Витебская губерния
- Governorate of the Russian Empire (1802–1917), Belarusian Democratic Republic (1918–1919), and Byelorussian Soviet Socialist Republic (1919–1924)
- 1802–1924
- Coat of arms

- Location in the Russian Empire
- Capital: Vitebsk
- History
  - Established: 1802
  - Disestablished: 1924
- Political subdivisions: twelve uyezds
Preceded by
Belarusian Governorate
Succeeded by
Latvia
Pskov Governorate
Belarusian SSR
- Today part of: Belarus; Latvia (Latgale); Russia

Vitebsk Governorate (Russian: Витебская губерния, romanized: Vitebskaya guberniya, Belarusian: Віцебская губерня, romanized: Vitsyebskaya hubernya, Latvian: Vitebskas guberņa) was an administrative-territorial unit (guberniya) of the Russian Empire, with the seat of governorship in Vitebsk. It was established in 1802 by splitting Belarusian Governorate and existed until 1924. Today most of the area belongs to Belarus, the northwestern part to Latvia and the northeastern part to Pskov and Smolensk Oblasts of Russia. Together with the Vilna, Kovno, Grodno, Minsk, and Mogilev Governorates, it formed the Northwestern Krai. The provincial city was Vitebsk, the largest city was Dvinsk (Daugavpils).

In December 1917 the north-western parts of the governorate were transferred to the Governorate of Livonia. On January 1, 1919, the Provisional Revolutionary Government issued a manifesto proclaiming the formation of the Socialist Soviet Republic of Belarus (SSRB) within the RSFSR, which included the Vitebsk, Grodno, Mogilev, Minsk and Smolensk provinces. On January 16, 1919 by the decision of the Central Committee of the RCP the Vitebsk, Mogilev and Smolensk provinces were returned into direct subordination to the RSFSR. By the decision of the Presidium of the All-Russian Central Executive Committee of the RSFSR of February 4, 1924 "On the transfer of the areas with a predominantly Belarusian population to Belarus" and by the resolution of the VI All-Belarusian extraordinary congress of the Soviets of the BSSR of March 13, 1924, the Vitebsk Polotsk, Sennensk, Surazh, Gorodok, Drissen, Lepel and Orsha counties of the Vitebsk province were transferred to the BSSR, while Sebezh, Nevelsk and Velizhsk counties remained in the RSFSR.

The province occupied the northeastern part of the modern Vitebsk region of Belarus, as well as the southeastern part of Latvia with the cities of Daugavpils (Dvinsk), Rēzekne (Rezhitsa) and Ludza (Lyutsin) and some Russian regions (Nevel and Sebezh - Pskov Oblast, Velizh - Smolensk Oblast, the village of Ilyino, which was part of the Velizh District - Tver Oblast).

== History ==
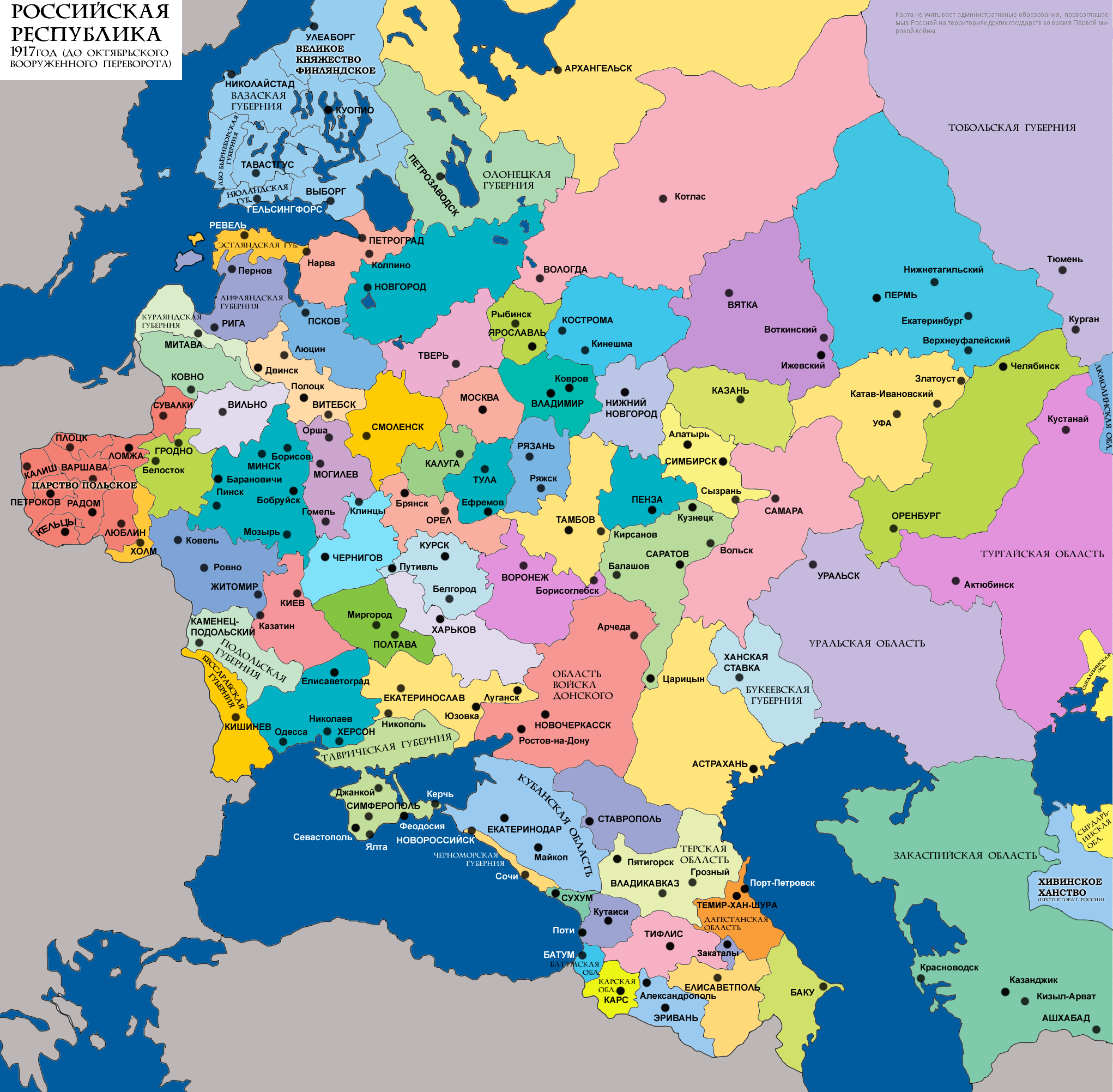
The European part of the Russian Empire in 1917. Vitebsk Governorate is shown in yellow.

In 1772, as a result of the First Partition of Poland, Inflanty Voivodeship and eastern Belarus were transferred to Russia. In order to accommodate these areas, Pskov Governorate was created. It was proven too big to be manageable, and in 1776 it was split into Pskov and Polotsk Governorates. In 1778 Polotsk Governorate was transformed into Polotsk Viceroyalty. In 1793, the Second Partition of Poland followed, which resulted in the expansion of Polotsk Viceroyalty. In 1796, viceroyalties were abolished. In particular, Polotsk and Mogilev Viceroyalties were merged into Byelorussia Governorate. On February 27, 1802 Byelorussia Governorate was split into Vitebsk and Mogilev Governorates.

The governorate consisted of 12 uyezds (the administrative centers, which all had the town status, are given in parentheses)

- Dinaburgsky Uyezd, from 1893 Dvinsky Uyezd (Dinaburg, currently Daugavpils, now in Latvia)
- Drissensky Uyezd (Drissa, now Verkhnyadzvinsk, Belarus)
- Gorodoksky Uyezd (Haradok, Belarus)
- Lepelsky Uyezd (Lepiel, Belarus)
- Lyutsinsky Uyezd (Ludza, Latvia)
- Nevelsky Uyezd (Nevel, Russia)
- Polotsky Uyezd (Polotsk, Belarus)
- Rezhitsky Uyezd (Rēzekne, Latvia)
- Sebezhsky Uyezd (Sebezh, Russia)
- Surazhsky Uyezd (Surazh, split between Russia and Belarus)
- Velizhsky Uyezd (Velizh, Russia)
- Vitebsky Uyezd (Vitebsk, Belarus)

In 1866, the Surazhsky Uyezd was abolished and split between Gorodoksky, Velizhsky, and Vitebsky Uyezds.

On 14 December 1917, the Dvinsky, Lyutsinsky and Rezhitsky Uyezds, populated mostly by Latvians (especially Latgalians) and known in Latvian as Latgale, were formally transferred according to decree No. 93 by the Council of People's Commissars of the RSFSR to the Governorate of Livonia, later becoming a part of the Latvian Soviet autonomy body of Iskolat. This decree supported the demands of the First Congress of Latgale Latvians of May 1917, organized by the Provisional Land Council of Latgale. Following the Latvian War of Independence, in 1920 the area became a part of the Republic of Latvia under the Latvian–Soviet Peace Treaty.

In 1918–1921, the rest of the Vitebsk Governorate was claimed by the Belarusian People's Republic, however, by 1919 it had become a part of the Russian Soviet Federative Socialist Republic.

In 1924, the Vitebsk Governorate was abolished. Most of it was transferred to the Byelorussian Soviet Socialist Republic, which at the time had districts as the first-level administrative division. Three uyezds - Sebezhsky, Nevelsky, and Velizhsky - were transferred to the Pskov Governorate.

== Demographics ==
Population by spoken language in Vitebsk Governorate (1897)
Language	Native speakers	Percentage
Belarusian	788,599	52.9%
Latvian	264,062	17.7%
Russian	198,001	13.2%
Yiddish	174,240	11.6%
Polish	50,377	3.3%
German	7,361	0.4%
Lithuanian	2,235	0.1%
Romani	1,054	0.07%
Other languages	3.317	0.2%
Total	1,489,246	100.00

== Parliament ==
When zemstvo institutions were introduced in 1864, the province was left non-zemstvo. In 1903, the "Regulations on the management of zemstvo economy in the provinces of Vitebsk, Volyn, Kiev, Minsk, Mogilev and Podolsk" was adopted according to which a modified order of zemstvo administration was introduced in the provinces, with the appointment of all members of zemstvo boards and zemstvo speakers by the government. This order was unsuccessful, after which a bill on the introduction of elective zemstvo institutions in these provinces was developed from 1910, but also with exceptions from the general order, aimed at the exclusion of Polish landowners from participation in zemstvos. The adoption of this law in 1911 was accompanied by an acute political crisis. The elective zemstvo in these six provinces began operation since 1912.

== Governors ==
The administration of the governorate was performed by a governor. The governors of Vitebsk Governorate were

- 1802–1808 Sergey Aleksandrovich Shishkin, governor
- 1808–1812 Pavel Ivanovich Sumarokov, governor
- 1812–1813 Ivan Frantsevich Leshern, governor
- 1813 Ivan Leontyevich Sushko, governor, died before his inauguration
- 1813–1818 Pyotr Petrovich Tormasov, governor
- 1818–1823 Alexey Petrovich Butovich, governor
- 1823–1829 Akinfy Ivanovich Sorokunsky, governor
- 1829–1830 Alexey Nikitovich Peshchurov, governor
- 1830–1831 Nikolay Mikhaylovich Gamaleya, governor
- 1831–1836 Nikolay Ivanovich Shryoder (Schroeder), governor
- 1836–1838 Ivan Stepanovich Zhirkevich, governor
- 1839–1840 Pyotr Petrovich Lvov, governor
- 1840–1846 Niktopolion Mikhaylovich Klementyev, governor
- 1846–1847 Mikhail Mikhaylovich Tatarinov, governor
- 1847–1848 Afanasy Alexandrovich Radishchev, governor
- 1848–1849 Yury Alexeyevich Dolgorukov, governor
- 1849–1853 Sergey Nikolayevich Yermolov, governor
- 1853–1856 Yegor Sergeyevich Tilicheyev, governor
- 1856–1858 Grigory Dmitriyevich Kolokoltsov, governor
- 1858–1861 Pavel Nikolayevich Kluchin, governor
- 1861–1863 Alexander Stepanovich Ogolin, governor
- 1863–1867 Vladimir Nikolayevich Veryovkin, governor
- 1867–1868 Pavel Pavlovich Kosagovsky, governor
- 1868–1869 Vladimir Nikolayevich Tokarev, governor
- 1869–1880 Pavel Yakovlevich Rostovtsev, governor
- 1880–1884 Viktor Vilgelmovich fon Val (von Wal), governor
- 1884–1894 Vasily Mikhaylovich Dolgorukov, governor
- 1894–1899 Vladimir Alexeyevich Levashov, governor
- 1899–1904 Ivan Ilyich Chepelevsky, governor
- 1904–1911 Berngard Berngardovich Gershau-Flotov, governor
- 1911–1915 Mikhail Viktorovich Artsimovich, governor
- 1915–1916 Nikolay Pavlovich Galakhov, governor
- 1916–1917 Boris Nikolayevich Khitrovo, governor

== Economy ==
74% of the population is employed in agriculture (farming, horticulture, forestry), 8% in manufacturing.

=== Industries ===
In 1903 there were 39 thousand workers engaged in cottage industries (diggers on the railroads, forestry, fishery); 48 thousand workers in handicrafts (woodwork, tailoring, shoe-making, fish-netting, coarse fleece weaving); 1293 factories and plants with 7 thousand workers and a volume of output of 6.5 and 5.5 million. 1 flax mill, 2 distilleries, 126 tanneries, 142 brickyards, 424 mills).

=== Agriculture ===
Rye, oats, barley, potato were grown. On average 13.2 million poods of winter rye, 3.6 million poods of barley, 7.2 million poods of oats and 20.2 million poods of potato were produced during 1900-1904; flax-growing was developed, industrial horticulture (apples, pears, plums); cattle breeding is in decline; forests occupy up to 35% of the gubernia's area, a lot of timber (pine, spruce), forest trades are developed, shipbuilding on the banks of the Western Dvina River; fishing on the lakes.

== Education ==
Educational institutions: according to Pavlenkov - 5 secondary schools, 9 special schools, 1,281 lower schools; according to Brockhaus-Efron - 1,667 in total with 61,000 pupils. Among them were 349 elementary schools of the Ministry of Public Education, 246 parochial schools, 659 literacy schools, 5 secondary schools with 2248 pupils, cadet corps, teachers' seminary, 5 religious schools, agricultural and craft schools; 385 Jewish schools (including 23 state schools) with 7095 pupils; literate - 24.5%.

== Geography ==
At the beginning of the XX century (1897) the territory of the province was 38,649.5 square miles (according to Brockhaus-Efron) or 39,700 square miles (according to Pavlenkov). The surface is undulating, the most elevated strip stretches from the Pskov Gubernia to Nevel and Gorodok (up to 952 feet high), then along the watershed of the Western Dvina and Dnieper; the western part (the Dvina, Lyutsinsk and Rezhitsa districts) is lowland; many lakes (about 2500), swamps and forests; the soil is low fertile, clay and sandy loam.

=== Rivers ===
The Western Dvina is navigable throughout its length, its tributaries Mezha, Kasplya (or Kisplya) and Ulla are navigable; the main rafting rivers are Luchessa (Luchosa), Ushach (Ushacha), Usyacha, Poloto (Polota) and Drissa.

=== Lakes ===
Major lakes are: Luban (112 square miles), Razno (75 square miles) and Osveiskoe (49 square miles); marshes occupy up to 4000 square miles.

=== Climate ===
West of the country is milder than east; West Dvina near Dvinsk is ice free 247 days a year

== Artistic tributes ==
In 1928, the American composer Aaron Copland composed the piano trio Vitebsk: Study on a Jewish Theme, and the work was premiered in 1929. Based on a Jewish folk song from S. Ansky's play The Dybbuk, Copland's piece is named for Vitebsk Governorate, where Ansky was born, and where he first heard the tune.

== Notable people ==
People from Vitebsk Governorate:

- Ottomar Gern (1827–1882), fortification engineer
- Bronislav Kaminski (1899–1944), Polish-Russian Nazi collaborator
- Vasili Komaroff (1871–1923), serial killer
- Evgeny Radkevich (1851–1930), Imperial Russian Army general
- Vissarion Komarov (1838—1908), Imperial Russian Army colonel
- Alexander Ragoza (1858–1919), general
- Nikolai Zaremba (1821–1879), musician
