= Pskov Governorate =

1772–1927 unit of Russia

Coordinates: 57°49′N 28°20′E

Pskov Governorate Псковская губерния (Russian)
- Governorate of the Russian Empire
- 1772–1927
- Coat of arms

- Location within the Russian Empire
- Capital: Pskov
- History
  - Established: 1772
  - Disestablished: 1927
- Political subdivisions: eight uyezds
Preceded by
Novgorod Governorate
Polotsk Voivodeship
Succeeded by
Pskov Oblast
Leningrad Oblast
Tver Oblast

Pskov Governorate (Russian: Псковская губерния, romanized: Pskovskaya guberniya) was an administrative-territorial unit (guberniya) of the Russian Empire and the Russian SFSR, which existed in 1772–1777 and 1796–1927. Its seat was located in Opochka between 1772 and 1776, and in Pskov after 1776. The governorate was located in the west of the Russian Empire and bordered (after 1796) Saint Petersburg Governorate in the north, Novgorod Governorate in the northeast, Tver Governorate in the east, Smolensk Governorate in the southeast, Belarusian Governorate (since 1802, Vitebsk Governorate) in the south, and Governorate of Livonia in the west.

In terms of modern administrative division of Russia, the area of the governorate is currently split between the Pskov, Tver, and Novgorod oblasts. The former border between Pskov Governorate and Governorate of Livonia still largely corresponds to the state border between Russia in the east and Estonia and Latvia in the west.

== History ==
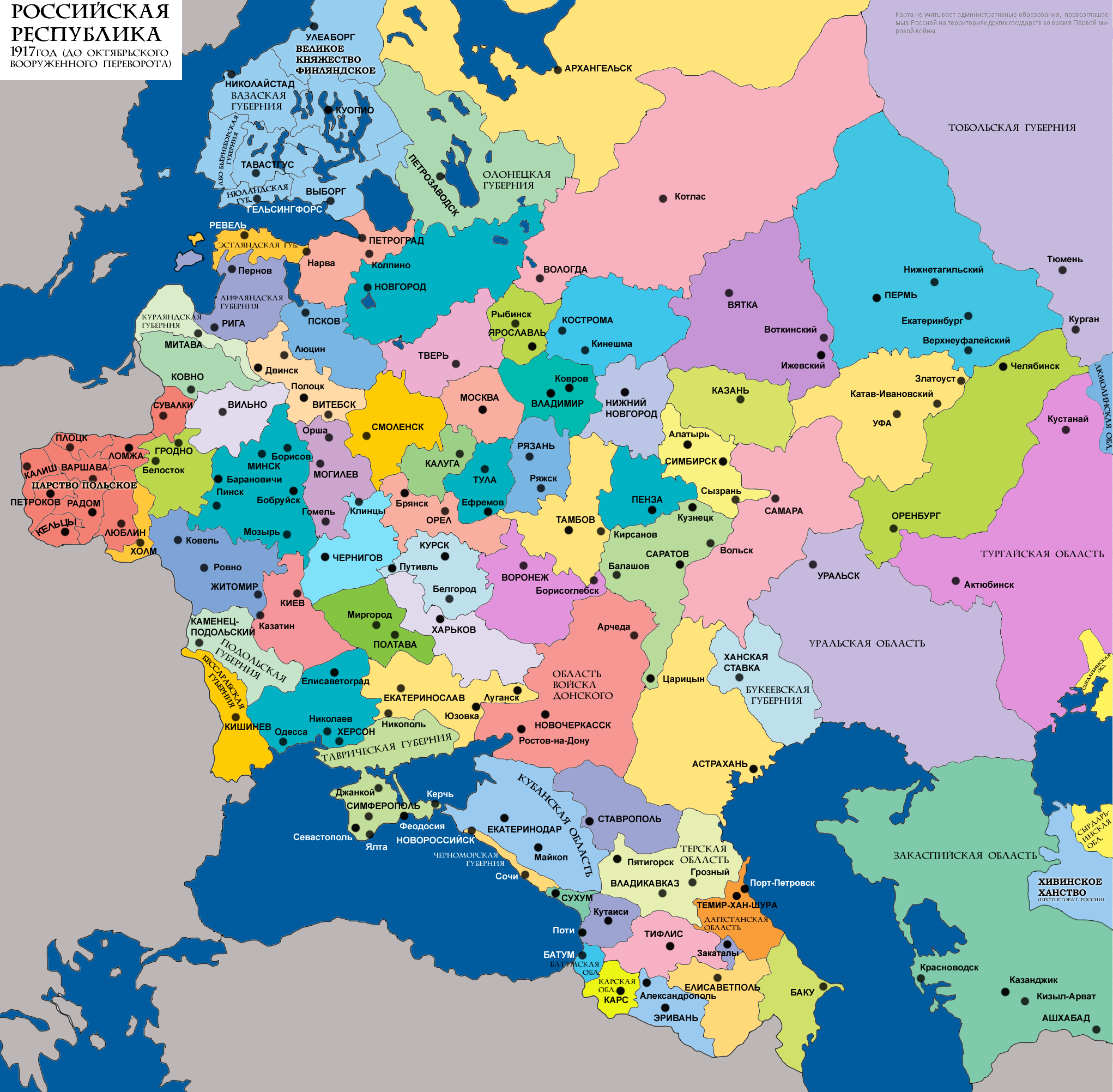
The European part of the Russian Empire in 1917. Pskov Governorate is shown in blue.

In 1772, as a result of the First Partition of Poland, Inflanty Voivodeship and eastern Belarus were transferred to Russia. In order to accommodate these areas, Pskov Governorate was created, and Velikiye Luki and Pskov Provinces of Novgorod Governorate (with the exception of future Gdovsky Uyezd) were transferred to this governorate. In addition, Vitebsk, Polotsk, and Dvina, taken over from Poland, were included into the governorate. The town of Opochka was made the administrative center of the governorate.

Pskov Governorate has proven to be too big to be administered properly, and in 1776, the decree of the empress, Catherine the Great, was issued. It divided the governorate into Pskov and Polotsk Governorates. Pskov was made the administrative center of Pskov Governorate. Gdov and Porkhov were transferred from Novgorod to Pskov Governorate.

In 1777, Pskov Governorate was transformed into Pskov Viceroyalty, which was administered from Novgorod by Jacob Sievers, who at the same time administered Novgorod and Tver Viceroyalties. In 1796, the viceroyalty was abolished, and on 31 December 1796 the emperor Paul I issued a decree restoring Pskov Governorate. At this point, the governorate consisted of the following six uyezds (the administrative centers, which all had the town status, are given in parentheses),

- Pskovsky Uyezd (Pskov);
- Opochetsky Uyezd (Opochka);
- Ostrovsky Uyezd (Ostrov);
- Porkhovsky Uyezd (Porkhov);
- Toropetsky Uyezd (Toropets);
- Velikoluksky Uyezd (Velikiye Luki).

Izborsk was a town but not an uyezd center.

In 1802, Novorzhevsky Uyezd (with the center in Novorzhev) and Kholmsky Uyezd (Kholm) were established.

In 1920, the westernmost part of Pskovsky Uyezd were transferred to Estonia, and the southwesternmost part of Pskovsky Uyezd and 3 volosts of Ostrovsky Uyezd went to Latvia.

In 1924, Velizhsky, Nevelsky, and Sebezhsky Uyezds of Vitebsk Governorate were transferred into Pskov Governorate.

On August 1, 1927 Pskov Governorate was abolished and transferred to Leningrad Oblast.

== Governors ==
The administration of the governorate was performed by a governor. The governors of Pskov Governorate were

- 1772–1775 Mikhail Nikolayevich Krechetnikov, governor;
- 1775–1776 Alexey Vasilyevich Naryshkin, governor;
- 1776–1777 Khristophor Romanovich Nolken, governor.
- 1797 Ivan Alexeyevich Molchanov, governor;
- 1797–1798 Larion Spiridonovich Alexeyev, governor;
- 1798–1800 Alexey A. Bekleshov, governor;
- 1800–1807 Yakov Ivanovich Lamzdorf (Jacob Lamsdorf), governor;
- 1807–1811 Nikolay Osipovich Laba, governor;
- 1811–1816 Pyotr Ivanovich Shakhovskoy, governor;
- 1816–1826 Boris Antonovich Aderkas, governor;
- 1826–1830 Andrey Fyodorovich Kvitka, governor;
- 1830–1839 Alexey Nikitich Peshchurov, governor;
- 1839–1845 Fyodor Fyodorovich Bartolomey, governor;
- 1845–1856 Alexey Yegorovich Cherkasov, governor;
- 1856–1864 Valerian Nikolayevich Muravyov, governor;
- 1864–1867 Konstantin Ivanovich von der Palen, governor;
- 1867–1868 Boris Petrovich Obukhov, governor;
- 1868–1872 Mikhail Semyonovich Kakhanov, governor;
- 1886–1888 Alexander Alexandrovich Ikskul von Gildenbandt, governor;
- ? Alexander Lvovich Cherkasov, governor;
- 1900–1903 Boris Alexandrovich Vasilchikov, governor;
- 1903–1911 Alexander Vasilyevich Adlerberg, governor;
- 1911–1915 Nikolay Nikolayevich Medem, governor;
- 1915–1916 Dmitry Grigoryevich Yavlensky, governor.
