= List of Belarusian folklore collections =

The following is a list of collections containing Belarusian folklore (chronological by year of publishing).

== 17th-18th century ==
| Collection | Collector(s) | Location | Published | Notable content |
|---|---|---|---|---|
| "Polish proverbs" | Salomon Rysiński | Liubcha area, Nowogródek Voivodeship, Grand Duchy of Lithuania | 1618 | Proverbs recorded from Belarusian peasants, published in Polish and Latin |

== 19th century ==
| Collection | Collector(s) | Location | Published | Notable content |
|---|---|---|---|---|
| Wedding rituals observed 1800–1802, with songs and musical notations | Ignacy Szydłowski | Minsk Governorate, Borisovsky Uyezd, Gaiensk Parish | 1819 in the Tyhodnik Vilienski, repr. 1847 in the book by E. Tyszkievicz | includes songs and musical notations |
| The Polish People, Their Customs and Superstitions | Łukasz Gołębiowski | | 1830 | Includes Szydłowski's wedding ritual and excerpts from Charnoŭskaya's article |
| Games and Entertainments of Different Estates | Łukasz Gołębiowski | | | Children's folklore, description of the Kust ritual, Kupala celebrations, two musical examples of Kupala and Rusalka melodies |
| Village Songs from the Neman (1/6) | Jan Czeczot | Nadnioman region | 1837 | 99 Belarusian and 1 Ukrainian song in Polish translation |
| Entertainments and Festivities of Village People. Kupala | Eustachy Tyszkiewicz | | 1837 | First publication by Tyszkiewicz; dedicated to the Kupala celebration |
| Village Songs from the Neman and Dvina (2/6) | Jan Czeczot | Nadzvina and Nadnioman regions | 1839 | 94 Nadzvina and 26 Nadnioman songs (wedding, Kupala, harvest, etc.) |
| Belarus. A Few Words on the Poetry of the Common People... | Aliaksandr Rypinski | Vitsebsk region | Paris, 1840 | Christmas/Kaliada, volachobny, wedding, historical, love, dance songs; funeral laments; first scholarly description of the volachobny ritual; harvest, children's folklore, proverbs |
| Village Songs from the Neman and Dvina and Some Proverbs and Idioms (6/6) | Jan Czeczot | Nadnioman and Nadzvina regions | 1846 | Volachobny, Yuryev, spring, Kupala, Christmas, harvest, wedding, christening, children's, and other songs in original Belarusian; also includes "Krivichy proverbs," a phraseological index, and a glossary |
| Description of Borisovsky Uyezd... | Eustachy Tyszkiewicz | Borisovsky Uyezd, Minsk Governorate | Vilnius, 1847 | Wedding ritual with detailed description of the karavai (bread) ceremony, ancestral commemoration rites (Dziady, Radunica), Kaliada festivities, volachobny processions, harvest songs, proverbs |
| Folk Songs of the Pinsk People | Ramuald Ziankievič (1811–68) | Pinsk region, villages on the Pina, Pripiat, and Tsna rivers | 1851 | Over 200 works: Christmas songs, wedding, Kust celebration (first thorough description of this holiday), Kupala; wedding songs ordered by ritual stages |
| Belarusian Folk Songs | Jelizavieta Paŭloŭskaja (1830-1915) | Bykhovsky Uyezd, Moglilev Governorate | 1853 | Detailed description of the Belarusian wedding with songs by ritual stages; criticized for publishing Belarusian songs in Russian translation only |
| Ethnographic View of the Vilna Governorate | Adam Kirkor | Vilna Governorate | 1858 (in Этнаграфічны зборнік, issue 3) | 227 songs (many reprinted from Tyszkiewicz and Czeczot); also covers customary law and other ethnographic topics |
| Materials for the Geography and Statistics of Russia, Vilna Volume | A. Karava | Vilna Governorate | 1861 | Songs (largely reprinted from Kirkor,Tyszkiewicz and Czeczot) |
| Materials for the Geography and Statistics of Russia, Smolensk Volume | M. Cebrykaŭ | Smolensk Governorate | 1862 | Mostly previously published Belarusian songs |
| Materials for the Geography and Statistics of Russia, Grodno Volume | Paviel Babroŭski (1832-1905) | Grodno Governorate | 1863 | |
| Collection of Monuments of Folk Art in the Northwestern Territory | Piotr Giltebrand (1840-1905) | Grodno, Vilna and Minsk Governorates | 1867 | 300 songs, 151 proverbs, 93 riddles collected by students of the Maladziechna Teachers' Seminary and others; criticized for including non-folk and falsified texts |
| Collection of Belarusian Proverbs | Ivan Nosovich | | 1867 | 3,500 proverb texts in alphabetical order with detailed commentary; considered a landmark in Belarusian folkloristics |
| Collection of Songs, Fairy Tales, Rituals and Customs of the Northwestern Territory | Mikhail Dmitriev (1832–73) | Grodno, Vilna and Minsk Governorates (?) | Vilna, 1869 | Mixed quality; criticized for errors, distortions, and inclusion of Polish and Russian songs |
| Works of the Ethnographic-Statistical Expedition to the Western Russian Territory (4 Volumes) | Pavlo Chubinskyi | Mozyrsky and Pinsk uyezds of the Minsk Governorate; Brest, Kobrin and Slonim uyezds of the Grodno Governorate | 1872-78 (vols. 1–4) | c. 400 songs, 25 fairy tales, 5 wedding ritual descriptions, 40+ calendar-ritual song texts; noted for dialect accuracy |
| Belarusian Folk Songs | Pavel Shejn | mostly Vitsebsk Governorate | 1873 (in Запіскі РГТ, vol. 5), 1874 | Over 1,000 texts (400 recorded by Shein personally); songs of various genres, fairy tales, legends, anecdotes, omens; awarded the small gold medal of the RGS |
| A Collection of Little Russian and White Russian Songs of the Gomelsky Uyezd, Recorded for Voice with Piano Accompaniment | Zinaida Radčanka (1839-1916) | Gomelsky Uezd | 1881 | 30 songs with piano accompaniment; awarded silver medal of the IRGS |
| Belarusian Polesie | Adam Kirkor | Polesia | 1882 (in Маляўнічая Расія, vol. 3, pt. 2) | Focus on traces of the past and pagan elements in folklore; extensive mythology gallery |
| An Essay Describing Mogilev Governorate... (3 vols.) | Aliaksandr Dambaviecki (1840-c.1918) | Homel and Mahilou regions in the Mogilev Governorate | 1882-84 | Vol. 1 includes 509 Belarusian songs (316 wedding); praised for accuracy of notation and partial passportization |
| Materials for the Study of Life and Language of the Russian Population of the Northwestern Territory (Vols. 1–3) | Pavel Shejn | | 1887-1893 | Vol. 1, pt. 1: 789 songs (ritual, convivial, domestic, humorous) + beliefs, notes for 18 songs; Vol. 1, pt. 2: wedding rituals from different regions, 911 songs, funeral rites and laments; Vol. 2: prose folklore — fairy tales, legends, proverbs; Vol. 3: ethnographic materials, wedding descriptions from Slutsk/Mozyr/Navahrudak, children's games Vol. 2: prose folklore — fairy tales, legends, proverbs; Vol. 3: ethnographic materials, wedding descriptions from Slutsk/Mozyr/Navahrudak, children's games |
| Belarusian Songs... | Pyotr Bessonov | | | 181 texts (based on the Kireyevsky archive): Volachobny, Yuryev, Kust, Kupala, Christmas, Maslenitsa songs; interpreted through the mythological school |
| The Malorossian Wedding in the Karnitsa Parish... | Nikolai Ianchuk | Konstantynów Uyezd, Siedlce Governorate | 1886 | Wedding songs with full dialect preservation and musical notation |
| Belarusian Collection, Vol.1-2 | Ieudakim Ramanau | | Kiev, 1886 (vols. 1–2) | diverse folklore (criticized for inconsistent classification) |
| Belarusian Collection, Vol.3 | Ieudakim Ramanau | | 1887 | prose works (animal epics, mythical, domestic tales) |
| The Belarusian Wedding and Wedding Songs | Mitrafan Dovnar-Zapolski | | Kiev, 1888 | Detailed study of the wedding ritual and its poetry |
| Gomel Folk Songs | Zinaida Radčanka (1839-1916) | Diatlovskaia Volost, Gomelsky Uyezd | 1888 | 676 songs, 84 proverbs; spring, Kupala, harvest, Christmas songs; ~300 non-ritual songs; introduction on Belarusian work customs and singing style |
| Across Minsk Governorate | Nikolai Ianchuk | Minsk Governorate | 1889 | 158 songs: wedding, christening, Kaliada, Maslenitsa, spring, Kupala, harvest, historical, and other types; notes on variants in earlier collections |
| The Pinsk People | Dmitrii Bulgakovskii (1843-after 1918) | Pinsk region | St. Petersburg, 1890 | Calendar-ritual songs (Christmas, spring, summer), wedding songs, non-ritual songs, riddles, proverbs, ritual descriptions, divination; includes a dialect glossary |
| Belarusian Collection, Vols.4-5 | Ieudakim Ramanau | | 1891 | Vol. 4: prose; Vol. 5: spells, batleika texts, spiritual verses |
| Smolensk Ethnographic Collection, Vols. 1-3 | Uladzimir Dabravoĺski (1856-1920) | Smolensk Governorate | 1891-1903 | (Russian and Belarusian material) Vol. 1: prose — tales, legends, fairy tales, spells (first to include memoir-narratives); Vol. 2: family-ritual poetry — 18 christening songs, 680 wedding songs, 14 funeral laments; Vol. 3: proverbial lore organized by key words; Vol. 4: calendar-ritual songs of all seasons, children's songs, historical songs, spiritual verses |
| Songs of the Pinsk People | Mitrafan Dovnar-Zapolski | Pinsk, Mozyr, Rechitsa and Bobruisk districts; also Lakhva/Mozyr and Lashany/Grodno | Kiev, 1895 | 561 songs (+ 40 in appendix); ritual and lyrical songs; dialect glossary; commentary with variants; noted for recording from live performance |
| The Belarusian People in Lithuanian Rus', Vol.1 | Michał Federowski | | 1897 | beliefs, superstitions, mythical beings, folk medicine |

== 20th century ==
| Collection | Collector(s) | Location | Published | Notable content |
|---|---|---|---|---|
| The Belarusian People in Lithuanian Rus', Vol.2 | Michał Federowski | | 1901 | 410 fairy tales and legends |
| Belarusian Collection, Vol.6 | Ieudakim Ramanau | | 1901 | fairy tales |
| Litvins — Belarusians of Chernigov Governorate, Their Life and Songs | Mariia Kosych (1850-1911) | Mglinsky Uyezd, Chernigov Governorate | 1901 (in Живая старина, issue 2) | Calendar rituals by month, wedding and christening rituals, social-domestic, love, family, round-dance songs; regional specifics of Belarusian song traditions in Chernigov area |
| Materials for the Study of Life and Language of the Russian Population of the Northwestern Territory (Vol. 4) | Pavel Shejn | | 1902 (posthumous) | |
| The Belarusian People in Lithuanian Rus', Vol.3 | Michał Federowski | | 1903 | legends, tales, anecdotes |
| Materials on Belarusian Literature and Language | Jaŭhien Liacki (1868-1942) | | 1904 (in Известия ОРЯС ИАН, no. 9) | Lullabies, christening, harvest, humorous, satirical, love, orphan, wedding, convivial songs; criticized for incomplete passportization |
| Belarusian Collection, Vol.7 | Ieudakim Ramanau | | between 1901 and 1912 | songs and chastushki with 50 musical notations by Churkin |
| Materials on the Ethnography of Grodno Governorate, Vol. 1 | Ieudakim Ramanau | Grodno Governorate | Vilna, 1911 | Christmas, volachobny, Yuryev, Kust, Kupala, Petrov, harvest, wedding songs + chastushki |
| Tales and Stories of Belarusian Poleshchuks | Aliaksandr Sieržputoŭski (1864-1940) | Polesia | 1911 | Socially sharp tales, psychologically nuanced domestic fairy tales; prominent mythological characters (devil, fate, personified sun, star) |
| [Untitled 1911 song collection] | Zinaida Radčanka (1839-1916) | Gomelsky Uyezd | 1911 | 180 songs with melodies; extended preface on performance style and melody |
| Materials on the Ethnography of Grodno Governorate, Vol. 2 | Ieudakim Ramanau | Grodno Governorate | Vilna, 1912 | non-ritual wedding songs, spiritual verses, legends, fairy tales, chastushki |
| Belarusian Collection, Vols.8-9 | Ieudakim Ramanau | | Vilna, 1912 | Vol. 8: 1,200+ songs with calendar and family ritual descriptions; Vol. 9: folk speech samples |
| Tales and Stories of the Belarusians of Slutsk District | Aliaksandr Sieržputoŭski (1864-1940) in 1890-1923 | Slutsky uezd | 1926 | Fairy tales and stories recorded mainly in villages Chudzin and Vialiki Rozhyn |
| Materials for the Study of Folklore and Language of Vitebsk Region (in 2 parts) | Aliaksandr Šliubski (1897-1942) | Vitsebsk region | 1927-28 | Songs by genre and type: Christmas, Maslenitsa, spring, Rusalka, Kupala, work, christening, wedding songs, chastushki, funeral laments; detailed wedding ritual descriptions |
| Eastern Polesie | | Eastern Polesia, Mozyrsky Uyezd (villages of Diakavichy, Daraševichy, Halubitsy) | 1928 | Wedding rituals, spring, Kupala, harvest songs (~250 songs total) |
| Folk Songs with Melodies | Maksim Haretski, A. Jahoraŭ | Village of Bahatskauka, Mstsislavsky Uyezd | 1928 | 318 songs recorded from Iefrasinnia Haretskaia; 125 melodies notated; calendar songs (winter, spring, Kupala, harvest) and wedding songs (117); first large publication of Belarusian songs with melodies |
| Rechitsa Polesie | Czesław Pietkiewicz (1856-1936) | Rechitsa Polesia | 1928 | Material culture of Belarusians |
| Belarusian Folk Songs (Polish edition) | Ryhor Šyrma (1892-1978) | | Poland, 1929 | Songs in arrangements by composers K. Halkouski, M. Antsaŭ, A. Hrachanikaŭ |
| The Belarusian People in Lithuanian Rus', Vol.4 | Michał Federowski, completed by Czesław Pietkiewicz (1856-1936) | | 1935 | 13,000+ proverbs, sayings, phraseologisms |
| Spiritual Culture of Rechitsa Polesie | Czesław Pietkiewicz (1856-1936) | Rechitsa Polesia | Warsaw, 1938 (posthumous) | Rich selection of folklore genres alongside ethnographic descriptions; beliefs, calendar holidays, mythology |
| Belarusian Folk Songs, Riddles and Proverbs | Ryhor Šyrma (1892-1978) | Vileyka, Postavy, Slonim, Valozhyn, Grodno, Nesvizh and other districts | 1947 | 337 songs, 26 chastushki, 60 proverbs, 44 riddles |
| Belarusian Folk Songs and Dances | Mikalaj Čurkin (1869-1964) | | 1949 | 177 songs and dances: calendar-ritual, family-ritual, domestic, round-dance, game songs, chastushki |
| The Belarusian People in Lithuanian Rus', Vol.5 | Polish Academy of Sciences | | 1958 | 13,000+ proverbs, sayings, phraseologisms |
| Belarusian Folk Songs | Mikalaj Čurkin (1869-1964) | | 1959 | Nearly all traditional folk songs; classified by functional genre: calendar-ritual, family-ritual, Cossack, recruit, love, women's, dance songs |
| Songs of the Belarusian People | Hienadź Citovič (1910–86) | | 1959 | 296 songs |
| The Belarusian People in Lithuanian Rus', Vol.6 | Polish Academy of Sciences | | 1960 | 2,105 songs (love, wedding, family, calendar) |
| Belarusian Folklore of the Great Patriotic War | Ivan Hutaraŭ (1906–67), Moisei Hrynblat (1905–83), Kanstantsin Kabašnikaŭ (1927-2012) and others | | 1961 | Songs, chastushki, fairy tales, legends, proverbs, anecdotes, humoresques; each text with full commentary |
| Belarus-Polesia (vol. 52 of series Dzieła wszystkie) | Oskar Kolberg | Polesia and Pinsk region | 1968 (posthumous in vol. 52 of series Dzieła wszystkie) | Survey of publications about Polesia; calendar rituals from New Year onwards; wedding and funeral rites; songs, fairy tales, proverbs; bibliography on Belarusian life and culture |
| Anthology of Belarusian Folk Song | Hienadź Citovič (1910–86) | All Belarusian regions | 1968 | Two-part structure: traditional songs (Christmas, spring, volachobny, Yuryev, Kupala, harvest, wedding, christening, children's, love songs, ballads, social songs) and modern Soviet songs; recorded from multiple regions |
| Anthology of Belarusian Folk Song (2nd expanded ed.) | Hienadź Citovič (1910–86) | All Belarusian regions | 1975 | 430 songs |
| The Belarusian People in Lithuanian Rus', Vol.7 | | | between 1960 and 1981 | |
| Belarusian Folkloristics: Issues of Collecting and Studying Oral Folk Works | Academy of Sciences of the Belarusian SSR Institute of Art Studies, Ethnography and Folklore | All Belarusian regions | Minsk, 1980 | |
| The Belarusian People in Lithuanian Rus', Vol.8 | Polish Academy of Sciences | | 1981 | 865 songs (family-ritual, calendar-ritual, ballads, lyrical, Polish songs) |

== 21st century ==
| Collection | Collector(s) | Location | Published | Notable content |
|---|---|---|---|---|
| Belarusian Folklore: Materials and Research | Centre for Research into Belarusian Culture, Language and Literature of the National Academy of Sciences of Belarus | Belarus | Minsk, annually since 2014 | first periodical publication dedicated to folkloric texts and, more broadly, the traditional spiritual culture of the Belarusian people |

== See also ==
- Belarusian culture
- Belarusian folklore
- Belarusian folk music
- Ethnography
