= Gomel Governorate =

1919–1926 unit of Russia

Gomel Governorate was an administrative-territorial unit (guberniya) of the Russian SFSR from 1919 to 1926 with its capital in Gomel. It was formed from nine uyezds of the abolished Mogilev Governorate, one uyezd of Minsk Governorate and four uyezds of Chernigov Governorate.

At its establishment, Gomel Governorate was made up of fourteen uyezds:

- Bykhovsky Uyezd
- Gomelsky Uyezd
- Goretsky Uyezd
- Klimovichsky Uyezd
- Mglinsky Uyezd with Pochepsky District
- Mogilyovsky Uyezd
- Novozybkovsky Uyezd
- Orshansky Uyezd
- Rechitsky Uyezd
- Rogachev Uezd
- Starodubsky Uyezd
- Surazhsky Uyezd
- Chaussky Uyezd
- Cherikovsky Uyezd

In 1920, Orshansky Uyezd was transferred to Vitebsk Governorate. In 1921, Surazhsky Uyezd was renamed Klintsovsky. In 1922, Goretsky Uyezd became a part of Smolensk Governorate. On May 4, Mglinsky and Cherikovsky Uyezds were abolished and new Pochepsky District was established. On May 5, 1923, by the order of the Presidium of the All-Russian Central Executive Committee it was transferred to Bryansk Governorate.

In 1923, Bykhovsky, Klimovichsky, and Cherikovsky Uyezds were abolished and Kalininsky Uyezd was founded.

In March 1924, Kalininsky, Mogilyovsky, and Rogachev Uezds were transferred to the territory of the Byelorussian Soviet Socialist Republic.

In December 1926, Gomel Governorate was abolished. Gomelsky and Rechitsky Uyezds were transferred to the BSSR, and Klintsovsky, Novozybkovsky, and Starodubsky Uyezds were transferred to Bryansk Governorate of the Russian Soviet Federative Socialist Republic.
