= Polissia Okruha =

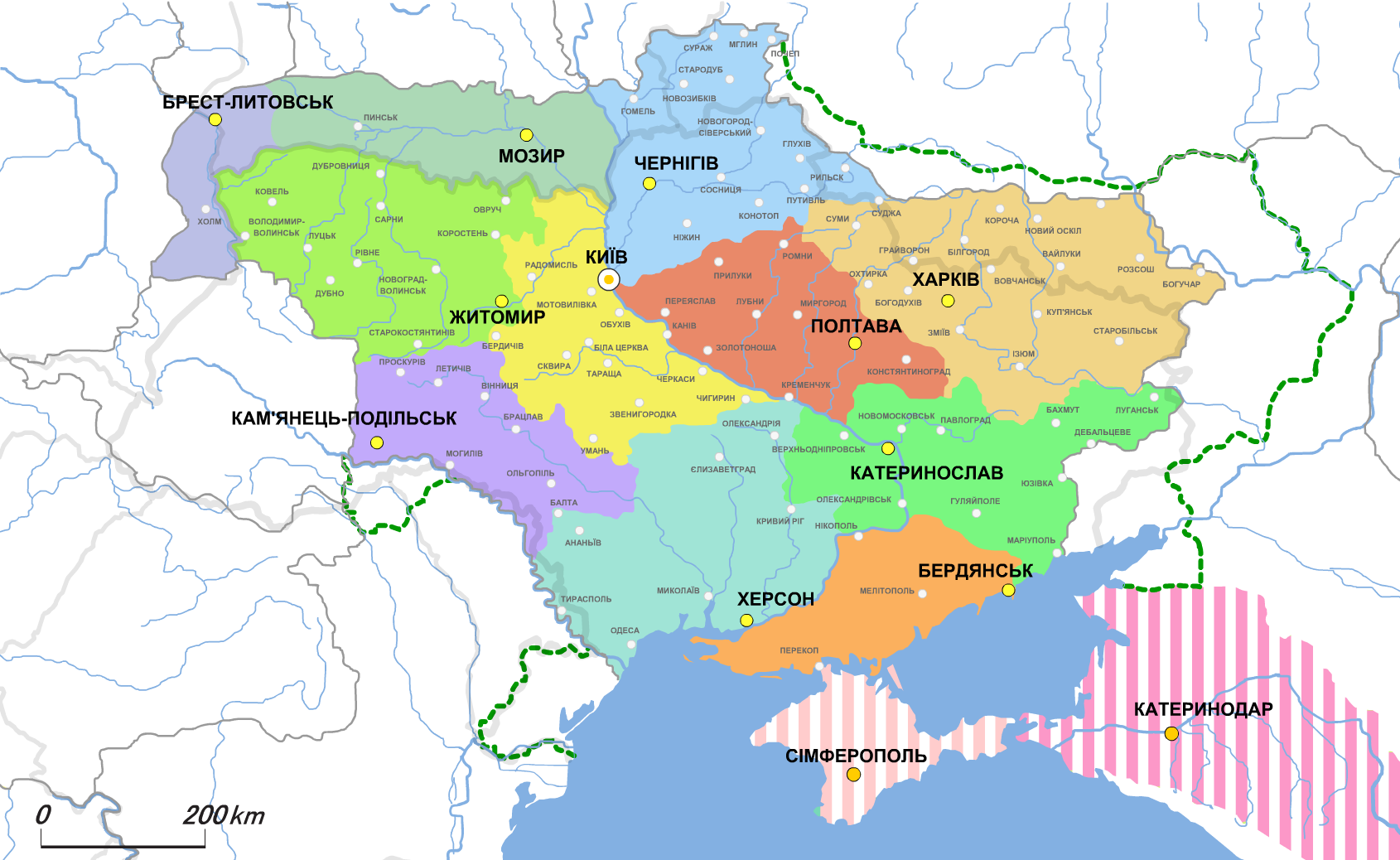
Administrative-territorial division of the Ukrainian State. Polissia Okruha

Polissia Okruha (Ukrainian: Поліська округа, romanized: Poliska okruha) was an administrative division of the Ukrainian State (Ukraine) that was created on August 14, 1918 by the resolution of the Council of Ministries. The okruha was governed by a starosta from Mozyr (today Belarus). The territory was named after its historical location Polesia (Polissia in Ukrainian).

== Subdivisions ==
- Mozyr County
- Richytsia County made of Rechitsky Uyezd, Russian Empire
- Pinsk County
- Slutsk County (southern part)
- Bobruisk County (southern part)

== See also ==
- Administrative divisions of Ukraine (1918-1925)
