= Andrei Mryj =

Belarusian satirist and journalist

Andrej Mryj
- Андрэй Мрый
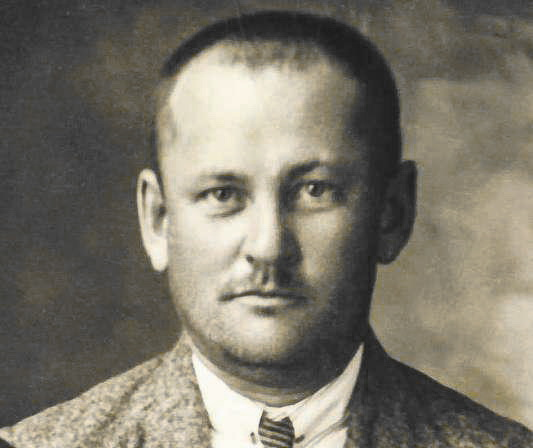
- Andrej Mryj in 1930
- Born: Andrej Šašalevič (Belarusian: Андрэй Шашалевіч); 1 (13) September 1893; Doŭhavičy, Cherikovsky Uyezd, Mogilev Governorate, Russian Empire or Paluž, Cherikovsky Uyezd, Mogilev Governorate, Russian Empire
- Died: 8 October 1943
- Resting place: Unknown
- Citizenship: Byelorussian Soviet Socialist Republic
- Occupations: writer, journalist, translator
- Writing career
- Pen name: Andrej Mryj
- Language: Belarusian
- Genres: satire, journalism
- Notable work: The Notes of Samson Samasuj (Belarusian: "Запіскі Самсона Самасуя")
- Movement: Uzvyšša

Andrej Mryj (Belarusian: Андрэй Мрый; 13 [O.S. 1] September 1893 – 8 October 1943) was the pen name of Andrej Šašalevič (Belarusian: Андрэй Шашалевіч), a Belarusian satirical writer, journalist, translator and a victim of Stalin's purges.

== Life ==
Mryj was born into a middle-class family in the Mogilev Governorate of the Russian Empire (nowadays the Mahilioŭ region in eastern Belarus). In 1914, he graduated from a seminary in Mahilioŭ and continued his theological education in Kyiv. In 1916 he was conscripted into the Russian Imperial Army. After the Bolshevik revolution, he served in the Red Army

In 1921, Mryj became a teacher and also got involved in amateur theatre, ethnography and journalism. His articles were published in leading newspapers of Soviet Belarus. In 1933, he was appointed an editor of a popular newspaper, Zviazda (The Star; Belarusian: Звязда).

Mryj was arrested by the Soviet secret police as a "member of an anti-Soviet counter-revolutionary organisation" in February 1934 and deported to Kazakhstan and then to Murmansk in the North of Russia. In June 1940, he was re-arrested and sent to one of the Gulag forced labour camps. In March 1943, he was registered as a disabled person by a medical commission.

Mryj died on 8 October 1943. The place of his burial is unknown.

Mryj was posthumously exonerated during Khrushchev's de-Stalinisation in January 1957, however there is no place of his commemoration in present-day Belarus.

== Work ==
In 1929, Mryj published his best-known work, a satirical novel "The Notes of Samson Samasuj" (Belarusian: Запіскі Самсона Самасуя, romanized: Zapiski Samsona Samasuja). "The Notes" tell a story of a fictional head of a local department of culture in Soviet Belarus. An inept official, he compensates his lack of competency by extraordinary activity in accelerating a cultural revolution in his district. He organises a series of absurd cultural events and initiatives intermingled with his turbulent love life.

The novel was badly received by the authorities. It was branded "vicious libel on Soviet reality". In Belarus, it was only fully published during Gorbachev's Perestroika in 1988. A film adaptation by a film director, Uladzimir Arlou, soon followed.
