= Rogachev Uezd =

Former administrative division of the Mogilev Governorate, Russian Empire

Rogachev Uezd Рогачёвский уезд (Russian) Рагачоўскі павет (Belarusian)
- Uezd
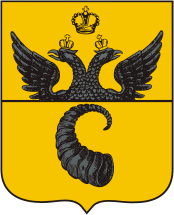
- Coat of arms

- The Rogachev Uezd as part of the Mogilev Governorate.
- Country: Russian Empire (1772-1917); Socialist Soviet Republic of Byelorussia (1917); RSFSR (1917-1922); Soviet Union (1922-1924)
- Governorate/Viceroyalty: Mogilev Governorate (1772-1778); Mogilev Viceroyalty (1778-1796); Belarus Governorate (1796-1802); Mogilev Governorate (1802-1919); Gomel Governorate (1919-1924)
- Established: 1772
- Dissolved: 17 July 1924
- Administrative Centre: Rogachev

Area
  - Total: 7,451.23 km^{2} (2,876.94 sq mi)

Population (1897)
  - Total: 224,652
  - Density: 30.1497/km^{2} (78.0872/sq mi)
  - Urban: 23.06%
  - Rural: 76.94%

The Rogachev Uezd (Note: Russian: Рогачёвский уезд, pre-1918: Рогачёвскiй уѣзд, romanized: Rogachyovsky uyezd; Belarusian: Рагачоўскi павет, romanized: Ragachowski pavet) was a county (uezd) of the Mogilev Governorate of the Russian Empire and early Soviet Union. It was situated in the southern part of the governorate. Its administrative centre was Rogachev, in present-day Belarus.

== History ==
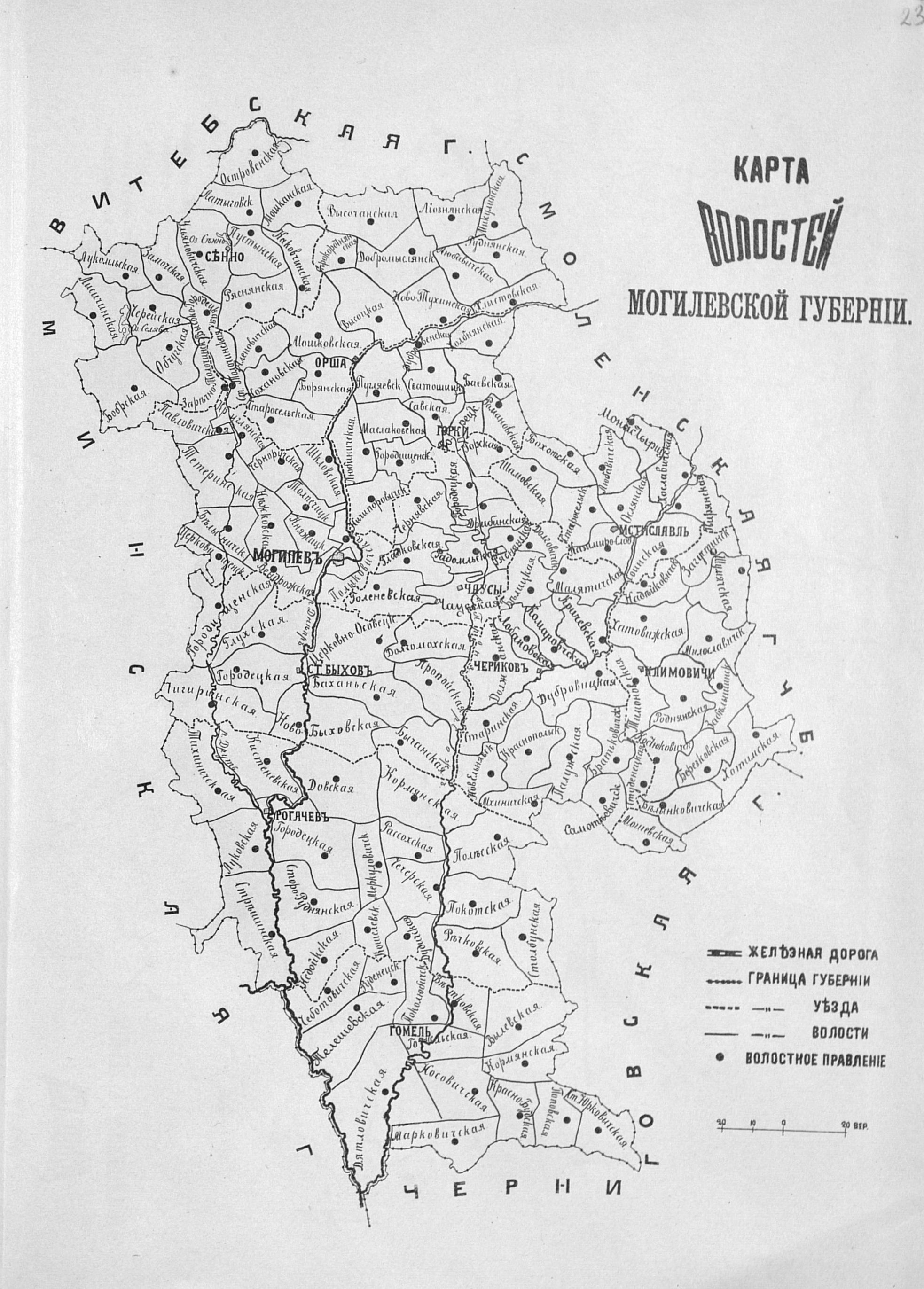
Mogilev Governorate in 1892.

After the first partition of the Polish-Lithuanian Commonwealth in 1772, obtained territory by the Russian Empire involved the territory that became the newly established Mogilev Governorate. The Mogilev Governorate included the short-lived Rogachev Province from 1772 to 1775, before the provintsiya system was abolished, which contained the Rogachev Uezd. From 1775 to 1796, the uezd was part of the Mogilev Governorate and Mogilev Viceroyalty proper. From 1796 to 1802, the uezd was a part of the brief Belarus Governorate, before it was transferred back into the reformed Mogilev Governorate from 1802 to September 1917.

In September 1917, the Mogilev Governorate became part of the Western Oblast. On January 1, 1919, the Mogilev Governorate became part of the newly formed Socialist Soviet Republic of Byelorussia, but was reluctantly given to the Russian Soviet Federal Socialist Republic on 27 February 1919 and disestablished on 11 July 1919, with the Rogachev Uezd becoming part of the Gomel Governorate within the Russian Soviet Federal Socialist Republic. The uezd remained within RSFSR territory, and after 1922, Soviet territory, until March 1924, when the Gomel Governorate was given to the Byelorussian Soviet Socialist Republic within the Soviet Union. On 17 July 1924, the Byelorussian SSR underwent an administrative system modernization, and abolished the Rogachev Uezd, transferring its territory to the Bobruysk Okrug as the Rogachev Raion.

== Administrative divisions ==
In 1888, the Rogachev Uezd had a total of 18 volost and 9 shtetl. Some volost were abolished or reassigned to other uezd over the existence of the uezd prior to 1888.

=== Volost as of 1888 ===
- Gorodets Volost
- Dovsk Volost
- Dudichi Volost
- Kisteni Volost
- Korma Volost
- Koshelevo Volost
- Luki Volost
- Merkulovichi Volost
- Nedoyki Volost
- Polesye Volost
- Pokot Volost
- Rassokhi Volost
- Rechki Volost
- Staraya Rudnya Volost
- Stolbun Volost
- Streshin Volost
- Tikhinichi Volost
- Chechersk Volost

==== Abolished or Reassigned before 1888 ====
- Ozerany Volost
- Bolotnya Volost
- Bartolomeevka Volost
- Khizov Volost
- Dobosna Volost
- Gadilovichy Volost
- Malevichy Volost
- Perelevka Volost
- Rogin Volost
- Sverzhen Volost
- Sherstin Volost
- Zabolote Volost

=== Shtetl ===
- Rogachev
- Gorodets
- Zhlobin
- Karpilovka
- Korma
- Sverzhen
- Streshyn
- Tikhinichi
- Chechersk

== Geography ==
The Rogachev Uezd was situated on both sides of the Dnieper river, with a majority of the land situated on the left bank. The southwestern portion of the uezd is forested, whereas the western portion is a plain stretching from the Bykhovsky Uyezd south towards the Sozh river, the villages of Ryskov and Merkulovichi, and the town of Cherikov. The plain was used predominantly for farming due to its fertility. The right side of the Dnieper river in the uezd is comparatively hilly.

Deposits of chalk, limestone, iron and peat are present in the uezd. Swamplands alongside 190 small lakes were present in the uezd.

== Demographics ==
The Rogachev Uezd was a predominantly rural subdivision, with the primary industry involving agriculture. At the time of the Russian Empire Census of 1897, the Rogachev Uezd had a population of 224,652. A majority of the population spoke Belarusian at 86.9%, with a sizeable Yiddish language demographic of 9.73%. 4.2% of the population lived in Rogachev, with 76.94% living in rural localities.

Linguistic composition of the Rogachev uezd in 1897
Language	Native Speakers	Percentage
Belarusian	195,296	86.9%
Yiddish	21,867	9.73%
Russian	4,427	1.97%
Polish	2,383	1.06%
Ukrainian	295	0.13%
German	114	0.05%
Others	79	0.04%
Tatar	73	0.03%
Lithuanian	48	0.02%
Romani	44	0.02%
Latvian	25	0.01%
Estonian	1	0.0004%
