= Dmitry Sukhovarov =

Soviet army colonel (1904–1982)

Dmitry Gavrilovich Sukhovarov
- Sukhovarov, c. 1945
- Born: 12 June [O.S. 30 May] 1904; Zhakovka, Chaussky Uyezd, Mogilev Governorate, Russian Empire (now Drybin District, Mogilev Region, Belarus)
- Died: 4 March 1982 (aged 77) Kurgan, Kurgan Oblast, Russian SFSR, Soviet Union
- Allegiance: Soviet Union
- Branch: Red Army (later Soviet Army)
- Service years: 1926–1956
- Rank: Colonel
- Commands: 69th Mechanized Brigade; 51st Guards Tank Brigade; 204th Tank Brigade
- Conflicts: World War II

Dmitry Gavrilovich Sukhovarov (Russian: Дмитрий Гаврилович Суховаров; 12 June [O.S. 30 May] 1904 – 4 March 1982) was a Soviet Army colonel and a Hero of the Soviet Union.

== Early life and prewar service ==
A Belarusian, Dmitry Gavrilovich Sukhovarov was born to a peasant family on 12 June [O.S. 30 May] 1904 in the village of Zhakovka, Chaussky Uyezd, Mogilev Governorate (now Drybin District, Mogilev Region, Belarus).

After completing six years of schooling, he became an apprentice in a tailor's shop in 1920 before working as a carpenter with a bridge building detachment and as a miner in Yuzovka in the Donbas.

Conscripted into the Red Army in November 1926, he was sent to the 33rd Rifle Division of the Belorussian Military District, graduating from the school of its 97th Rifle Regiment at Chausy in 1927. With the 97th, Sukhovarov served as a squad leader and assistant platoon commander, company starshina, and acting platoon commander in the 97th Rifle Regiment. Transferred to the 99th Regiment of the division, he continued his service as a platoon commander at the regimental school and chief of the one-year officer cadet detachment. During this period, Sukhovarov completed seven grades of night school.

After graduating from the Kiev Infantry School in 1931, Sukhovarov returned to the 99th as a company commander and served as acting regimental chief of staff before holding that position with an airborne battalion. He completed a correspondence course offered by the Military-Political Academy in 1933 and the Armored Commanders' Improvement Course at the Military Academy of Mechanization and Motorization (VAMM) in 1935. Appointed chief of staff of the 2nd Tank Battalion of the 16th Mechanized Brigade (later the 104th Separate Tank Battalion of the 22nd Light Tank Brigade) of the district in February 1936, Sukhovarov participated in the Soviet invasion of Poland. He became commander of the 107th Separate Tank Battalion of the 22nd Brigade in March 1940. Two months later, the brigade was relocated to the Baltic Special Military District, where in March 1941 Sukhovarov became commander of the 2nd Battalion of the 45th Tank Regiment of the 23rd Tank Division.

== World War II ==
After Operation Barbarossa began, Sukhovarov fought with the division in the border battles on the Northwestern Front. In September 1941 he became a battalion commander with the 9th Reserve Tank Regiment, and later that month succeeded to command of the regiment. Appointed chief of the 1st section of the Armored Department of the 24th Army in January 1942, he became acting deputy commander of the tank forces of the army on 25 March. From April he served as deputy chief of the Armored Department of the army for combat use of tanks. In July he transferred to serve as deputy chief of the Armored Department of the 64th Army, and on 15 August became deputy commander of the 56th Tank Brigade, with which he fought in the Battle of Stalingrad. The brigade was converted into the 33rd Guards Tank Brigade in February 1943, and Sukhovarov departed for the Academic Improvement Course for Officers at the Military Academy of Armored and Mechanized Forces (the renamed VAMM).

Following his completion of the course later that year, Sukhovarov received his first independent command, the 53rd Tank Regiment of the 69th Mechanized Brigade, in July. He led the regiment in the Battle of the Dnieper and the Zhitomir–Berdichev Offensive, receiving the title Hero of the Soviet Union on 10 January 1944 for his leadership; promotion to colonel followed on 26 February. Between 11 and 23 January he was acting commander of the 59th Separate Guards Tank Regiment, then returned to the 53rd, which he led in the Proskurov–Chernovitsy Offensive. Sukhovarov was acting commander of the 69th Mechanized Brigade between 5 and 18 March, and was hospitalized for a serious illness in late March.

After recovering, Sukhovarov was appointed commander of the 51st Guards Tank Brigade of the 6th Guards Tank Corps on 25 September. The corps joined the 1st Ukrainian Front on 28 October and fought in the Sandomierz–Silesian Offensive and the Lower Silesian Offensive from January 1945. In April, Sukhovarov was sent to the Moscow Armored Training Center, thence to the Soviet Far East to command the 204th Tank Brigade of the Maritime Group of Forces of the Far Eastern Front on 19 June. He led the brigade in the Soviet invasion of Manchuria.

== Postwar ==
After the end of the war, Sukhovarov served in the Primorsky Military District as commander of the 72nd Tank Regiment and the 77th Heavy Tank/Self-Propelled Gun Regiment, and as deputy commander of the 7th Guards Mechanized Division. He ended his career as deputy commander of the 10th Mechanized Division from October 1953, being transferred to the reserve in July 1956. Sukhovarov lived in Kurgan, where he worked as director of a driving school and head of the office of the passenger car fleet until his retirement in 1965. Sukhovarov died on 4 March 1982.

Buried in the New Rjabkovskoe cemetery in Kurgan, Kurgan Oblast, Russia.

== Awards and honors ==
Sukhovarov was a recipient of the following decorations:

- Gold Star Medal awarded to Heroes of the Soviet Union, 10 January 1944
- Order of Lenin (2), 10 January 1944 (awarded to Heroes of the Soviet Union) and 13 June 1952
- Order of the Red Banner (2), 20 September 1945 and 30 April 1947
- Order of Bogdan Khmelnitsky, 2nd class, 30 June 1944
- Order of the Patriotic War, 1st class, 1 May 1943
- Order of the Red Star (2), 3 November 1944 and ?
- Medals
  - Jubilee Medal "In Commemoration of the 100th Anniversary of the Birth of Vladimir Ilyich Lenin"
  - Medal "For the Defence of Stalingrad"
  - Medal "For the Victory over Germany in the Great Patriotic War 1941–1945"
  - Medal "For the Victory over Japan"
  - Medal "Veteran of the Armed Forces of the USSR"
  - Medal of Sino-Soviet Friendship
- Foreign decorations
