= Varvara Rudneva =

Russian Empire medical doctor

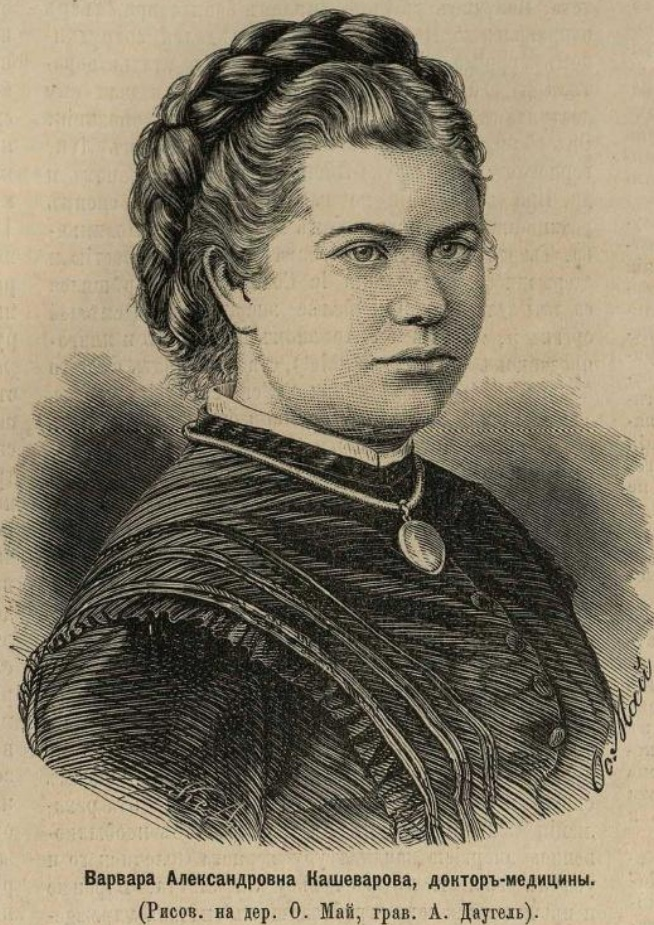
- Born: 1841 or 1842; Chausy, Chaussky Uyezd, Mogilev Governorate, Russian Empire
- Died: 11 May 1899 (aged 57–58) (O.S.: 29 April 1899); Staro-Preobrazhensky, Staraya Russa, Novgorod Governorate, Russian Empire
- Other name: Varvara Kashevarova Rudneva
- Occupations: Physician, obstetrician and gynecologist
- Known for: First female medical doctor matriculated from a Russian medical school

Varvara Aleksandrova Kashevarova-Rudneva (Russian: Варва́ра Алекса́ндровна Ру́днева-Кашева́рова; c. 1841 – 1899) was a Russian medical doctor. Rudneva was the second woman in Russia to become a doctor, after Nadezhda Suslova. She was the first woman in Russia to become a doctor and to have completed her education at a Russian medical school, an event which occurred at a time when women were barred from receiving training at such universities. Despite the ban, she was given a unique permission to study for her desire to treat women patients who refused to be treated by male doctors due to their religious beliefs. Her attendance at St. Petersburg Medical Surgical Academy, and later medical practice, were thereby unique in Russia, thus garnering attention from both the medical field and general public, making her a notoriously controversial figure.

== Early life ==
Varvara Rudneva was born in the town Chavusy of Mogilev Governorate. After the death of her mother, Rudneva briefly moved to Velizh Vitebsk province with her father until his death. Becoming an orphan at a very young age, Rudneva spent the first twelve years of her childhood being passed from one temporary family to another experiencing physical and emotional abuse. At the age of twelve years, Rudneva ran away from her adoptive family, a period during which she contracted typhus and was hospitalized for many months, and found her way to St. Petersburg hoping to learn a trade to provide for herself. While in St. Petersburg, she used a recommendation from the medical staff that presided over her to briefly be taken in by a seaman's family whose son taught her to read and was later introduced to a childless army surveyor that assumed guardianship of Rudneva by adopting her. Her adoptive father stifled her desires to seek education and thus, suspecting that he was grooming her to become a mistress, she escaped at the age of fifteen by marrying Nikolai Kashevarov whom, after breaking his promise to let her pursue education, she left after three years.

== Education ==
Despite possessing no formal education, Rudneva had chosen to pursue medicine and enrolled in a two year midwife training program at the Princess Elena Pavlovna Lyinng-in Home which she completed in eight months in the year 1862 whereupon she impressed and gained the support of her professor Dr. Veniamin Tarnovsky. Dr. Tarnovsky referred her for a position at the Kalinkinsky Hospital where she continued her training learning about and specializing in venereal diseases and how to treat, in particular, syphilis which was increasingly becoming a public health predicament for the population as it devastated the Bashkir people. Rudneva learned that treatment of venereal diseases was delegated to midwives because religious law did not permit male physicians to see Muslim women thus, feeling that a midwife could not provide the level of care necessary, decided to pursue training as a physician enrolling in the St. Petersburg Surgical Academy in 1863, as the first female student, through the recommendation of Dr. Tarnovsky who recruited the governor of Orenburg and the minister of war to support her admission. In the year 1864 it became illegal for women to take medical courses making her already controversial attendance a greater grievance for many, but Rudneva was allowed to continue studying for her diploma on the condition that she would not receive that academic rank that traditionally accompanied it. Rudneva received her degree of physician in 1868 without the academic title which barred her from working at any hospital in Orenburg. She was offered a position in the clinic of Sergei Petrovich Botkin. While there, she married Mikhail Matveevich Rudnev in 1870 giving her the opportunity to perform research in his pathology laboratory and decided to pursue the doctor of medicine diploma. She first attempted to defend her dissertation in 1873 but withdrew due to the sensitive nature of the ongoing experimental medical courses being offered for women. In 1876 she completed her doctoral thesis Materials Towards a Pathological Anatomy of the Vagina which she was allowed to defend in 1878 becoming both the first woman in Russia to defend a doctoral thesis in medicine and the first woman to receive a doctor of medicine diploma in Russia.

== Career and research ==
She specialized in obstetrics and gynecology, and her scientific articles were published in Russian and German scientific journals. Rudneva was admitted to the "Society of Russian Doctors in St. Petersburg" - the first woman to be admitted to the medical society. She had a medical practice in St. Petersburg, Zheleznovodsk, and Voronezh Province. Rudneva was also an author, writing the story "Pioneer" and "The history of women's medical education" (autobiography, "news", 1886); "Village notes" ("news", 1888 and others).

== Publications ==
- "A Chronic inflammation of the Decidua Membrane of the Uterus" (Medical Gazette, 1868)
- "About free abdominal bodies" (Virkhov's Archive, vol. 47)
- "The Doctrine of Placental Polyps" (Journal for Normal and Pathological Anatomy, 1873)
- Doctoral Thesis: "Materials for Pathological Anatomy of the Uterine Vagina" (1876)
- "Hygiene of the Female Body in All Phases of Life" (1892)

== Legacy ==
- A crater on Venus bears Rudneva's name.
