= Sergey Khovansky =

Russian Politician (1767-1817)

Sergey Nikolaevich Khovansky
- Сергей Николаевич Хованский
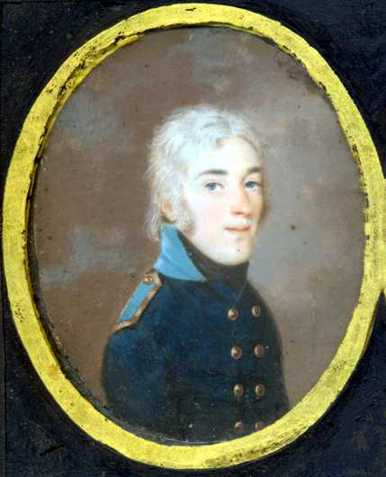

Minsk Governor
- In office March 1808 – December 1808
- Preceded by: Zakhary Korneev
- Succeeded by: Herman Rading

Simbirsk Governor
- In office 1803–1808
- Preceded by: Vasily Sushkov
- Succeeded by: Alexey Dolgorukov

Vladimir Vice–Governor
- In office December 19, 1798 – 1802
- Preceded by: Ivan Wolf
- Succeeded by: Gabriel Kolokoltsov

Personal details
- Born: October 3, 1767
- Died: March 26, 1817 (aged 49)
- Relations: Khovanskys
- Children: Alexander Khovansky
- Parents: Nikolay Khovansky (father); Maria Schepotyeva (mother)
- Awards: Order of Saint Anna

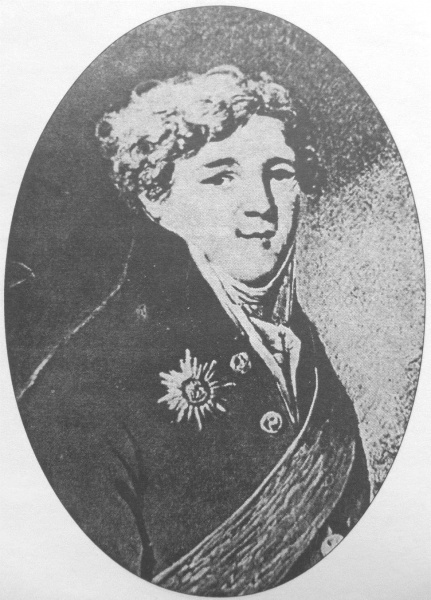
Sergey Khovansky

Prince Sergey Nikolaevich Khovansky (Russian: Серге́й Никола́евич Хова́нский; October 3, 1767 – March 26 (or 29), 1817, Arkhangelskoye, Stavropolsky Uyezd, Simbirsk Governorate) was an Actual State Councillor, governor of Simbirsk in 1802–1808.

== Biography ==
From the Russian princely family Khovansky. One of the grandchildren of Prince Vasily Khovansky; elder brother of Nikolai and Alexander Khovansky. From the age of 5 he was brought up in the Land Cadet Corps. In 1787, he was awarded the rank of lieutenant and sent to General–in–Chief Yuri Dolgorukov. In 1792, he was promoted to lieutenant colonel.

In May 1797, he entered the civil service with the rank of collegiate counselor. On December 19, 1798, he was appointed Vice–Governor of Vladimir Governorate under the Governor of Ivan Dolgorukov. Subsequently, he recalled Khovansky as a "good fellow" who tried to give him "every pleasure and distraction" and with whom they "communicated like brothers".

Having positively established himself in Vladimir, on May 21, 1800, he was promoted to State Councillor, and on July 19, 1802, he was appointed Governor of Simbirsk Governorate.

On June 24, 1804, he was promoted to Actual State Councillor.

On March 14, 1808, he was awarded the Order of Saint Anna of the 1st Degree and was appointed Governor of Minsk Governorate.

On December 4, 1808, he was dismissed from the post of governor due to illness.

He lived on his wife's estates, in the village of Arkhangelskoye and the village of Botma, Stavropol District, Simbirsk Governorate.

He died on 26 (according to other sources, 29) March, 1817, from consumption. He was buried at the cemetery of the Intercession Monastery in Simbirsk.

== Family ==
Prince Sergey Khovansky since 1805 was married to the widow of the Kazan Governor Ekaterina Aplecheeva (November 10, 1780 – April 16, 1836), née Naumova.

Children:

- Yuri (March 3, 1806 – January 9, 1868), chamber junker, collegiate assessor, married to Ekaterina Ivasheva, daughter of Peter Ivashev, had a daughter Maria, married to the nobleman Alexander Shishkov;
- Sergey (March 9, 1813 – December 1, 1853), collegiate registrar;
- Alexander (May 29, 1814 – January 7, 1885), collegiate secretary, leader of the nobility of the Chistopol District, the ancestor of all the current princes of the Khovansky, including Askold Georgievich;
- Sophia (October 3, 1810 – April 29, 1867), married to the Saint Petersburg Chief of Police Sergei Kokoshkin;
- Maria (March 20, 1812 – 1837), married to the general from the cavalry Alexander Baggovut.
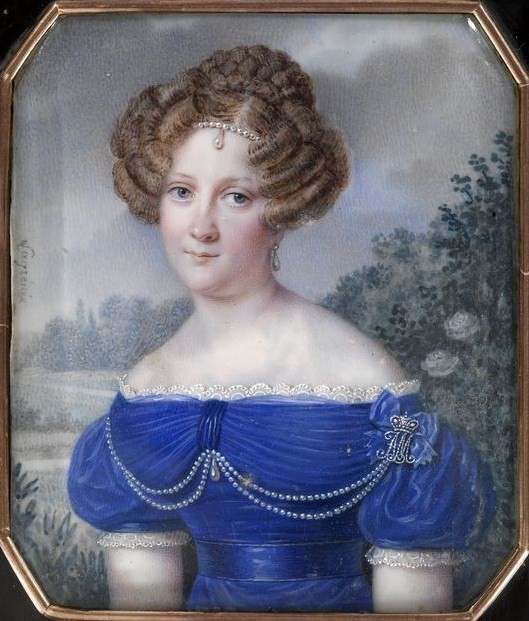
Portrait of his daughter, Princess Sophia Khovanskaya (1810–1867), maid of honor since 1827, wife of Sergey Kokoshkin since 1829

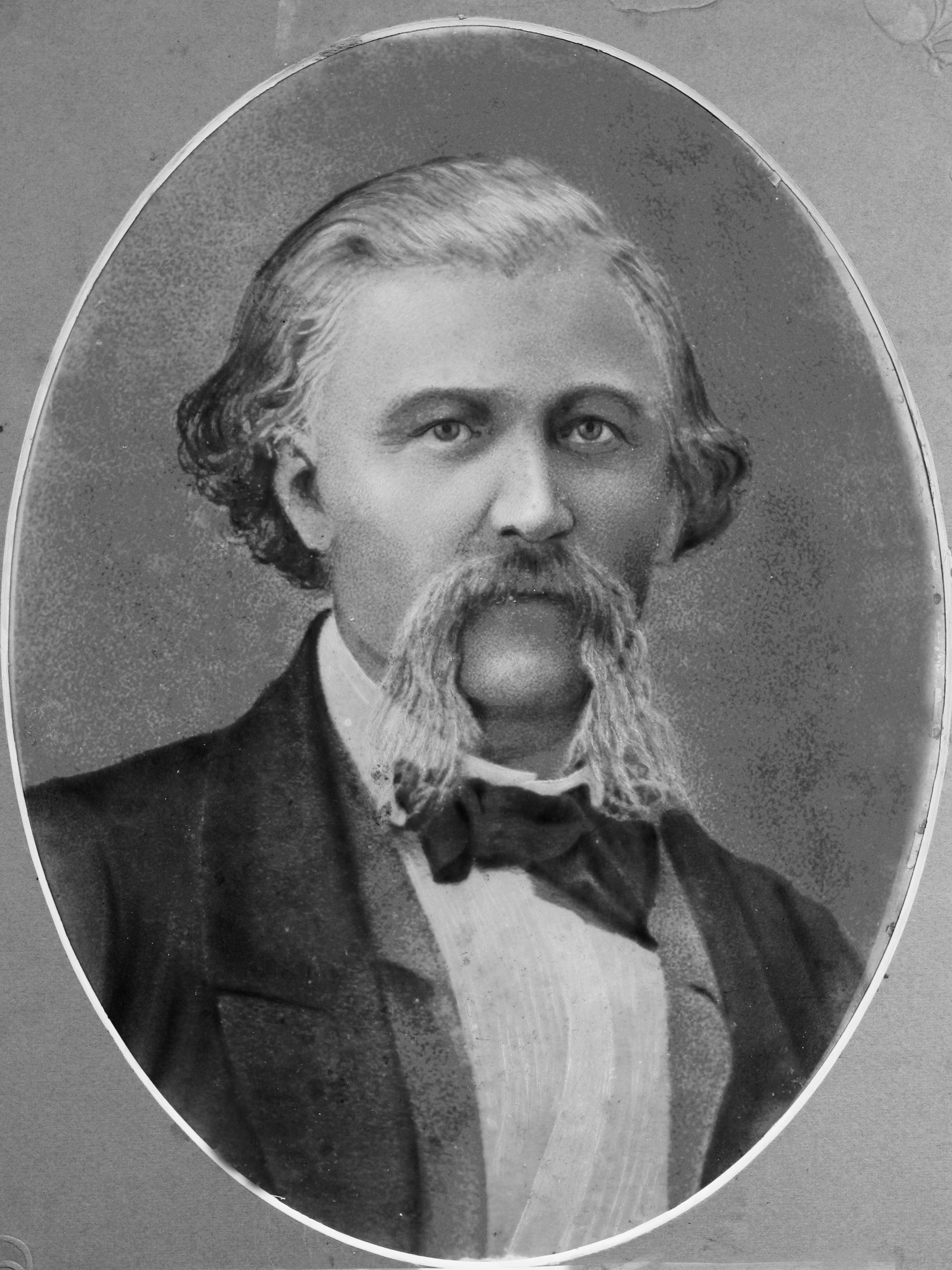
Prince Alexander Khovansky (1814–1885), son

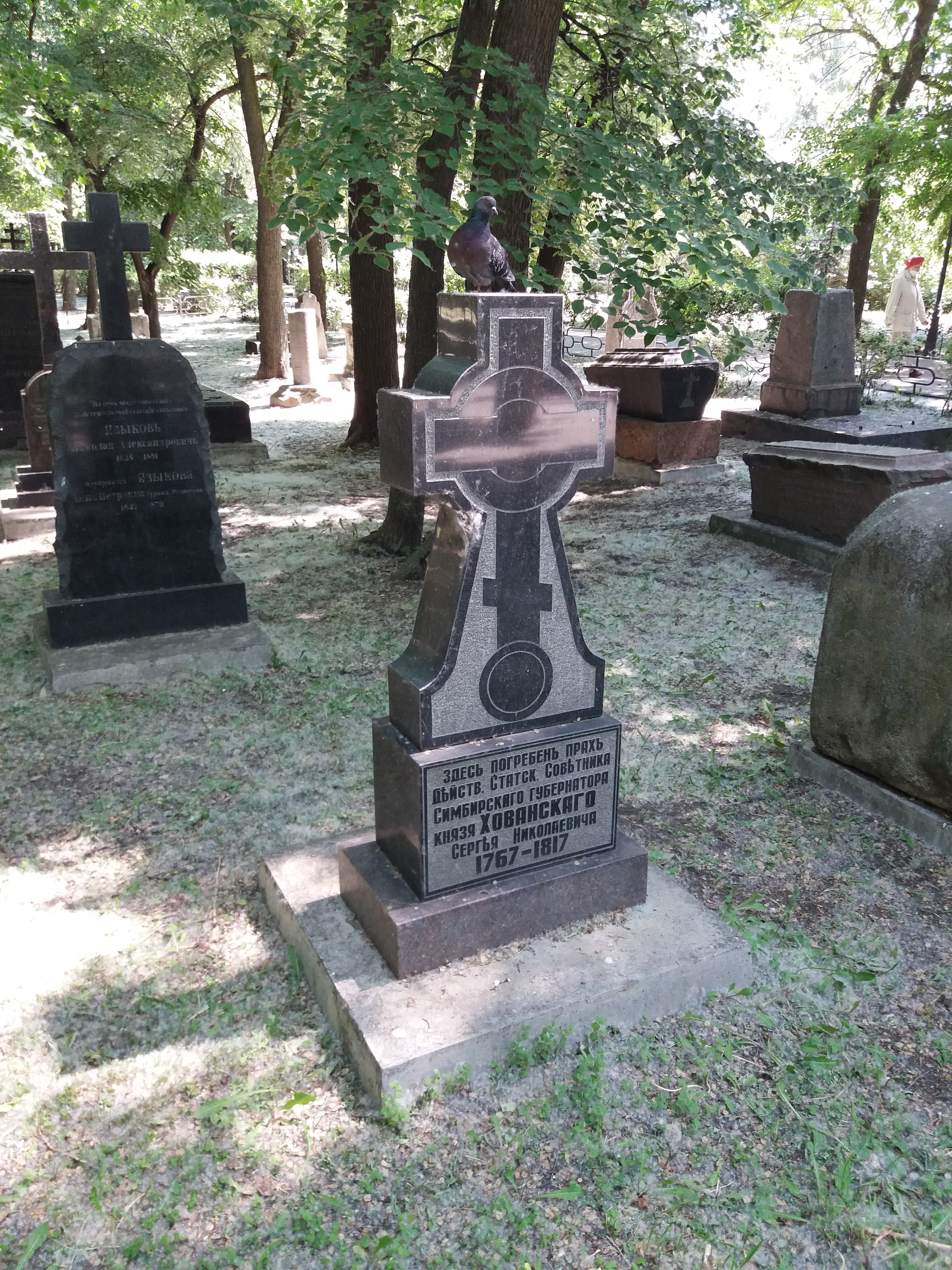
The grave of Prince Sergei Khovansky

== Sources ==
- Konstantin Gorbunov, Ivan Sivoplyas, Anton Shabalkin. Simbirsk Civil Governors: Materials for Historical and Biographical Sketches – Ulyanovsk: Institute for Advanced Studies and Retraining of Educators, 2003 – Pages 25–30
- "From the Collection of Acts of the Khovansky Princes", Sergei Belokurov, Synodal Printing House, Moscow, 1913. Pages 7–8
- Ulyanovsk Regional Branch of the Russian Geographical Society. Sergey Khovansky
- Pyotr Brigadin, Andrey Lukashevich. Minsk Governors: the History of Power – Minsk: State Institute of Management and Social Technologies of the Belarusian State University, 2009 – Pages 39–42
