= Minsk Province =

Minsk Province may refer to:

- Minsk Region, oblast of Belarus
- Minsk Governorate of the Russian Empire (1793–1921)
