= Mogilev Province =

Mogilev Province or Mahiloŭ Province may refer to:

- Mogilev Region of Belarus or Byelorussian SSR
- Mogilev Governorate of the Russian Empire (1802–1919)
