= Gomel Province =

Gomel Province or Homiel Province may refer to:

- Gomel region of Belarus
- Gomel Governorate of the Russian SFSR 1919–1926

== See also ==
- Gomel
