= Klimovichskiy Uyezd =

Klimovichskiy Uyezd Климовичский уезд
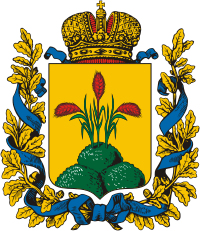
- Coat of arms

Population (1897)
  - Total: 143,287

Klimovichskiy Uyezd (Russian: Климовичский уезд) was an administrative unit of the Mogilev Governorate, Russian Empire, which existed between the years of 1777 and 1927. Klimavichy was the uyezd town of the administrative unit. The town is located in modern-day Belarus.

== History ==
Klimovichskiy Uyezd was formed in March 1777. In 1796, the Uyezd became a part of the Belarusian Governorate. In 1802, it became a part of the Mogilev Governorate.

From 1919, Klimovichskiy Uyezd became part of the newly formed Gomel Governorate of the Russian Soviet Federative Socialist Republic.

Starting in 1923, Soviet uyezds began transforming into different administrative districts called Raions. In June 1927, Klimovichskiy Uyezd officially became a part of the Belorussian Mogilev District.

== Population ==
In 1897, 143,287 people lived in Klimovichskiy Uyezd, with 4,714 people living in the main town of Klimavichy. 83.6% of the population of the uyezd spoke Belarusian, 10.8% Yiddish, 5.4% Russian, 0.5% Latvian, 0.5%Ukrainian, 0.3% Polish and 0.1% Romani as their native language.
