= Sennensky Uyezd =

Sennensky Uyezd (Сенненский уезд) was one of the subdivisions of the Mogilev Governorate of the Russian Empire. It was situated in the northwestern part of the governorate with its administrative centre in Syanno.

== Demographics ==
At the time of the Russian Empire Census of 1897, Sennensky Uyezd had a population of 161,652. Of these, 85.6% spoke Belarusian, 7.8% Yiddish, 3.4% Russian, 2.4% Polish, 0.5% Lithuanian, 0.2% Latvian and 0.1% German as their native language.
