= Alexey Dolgorukov =

Russian statesman

Alexey Alekseevich Dolgorukov
- Алексей Алексеевич Долгоруков
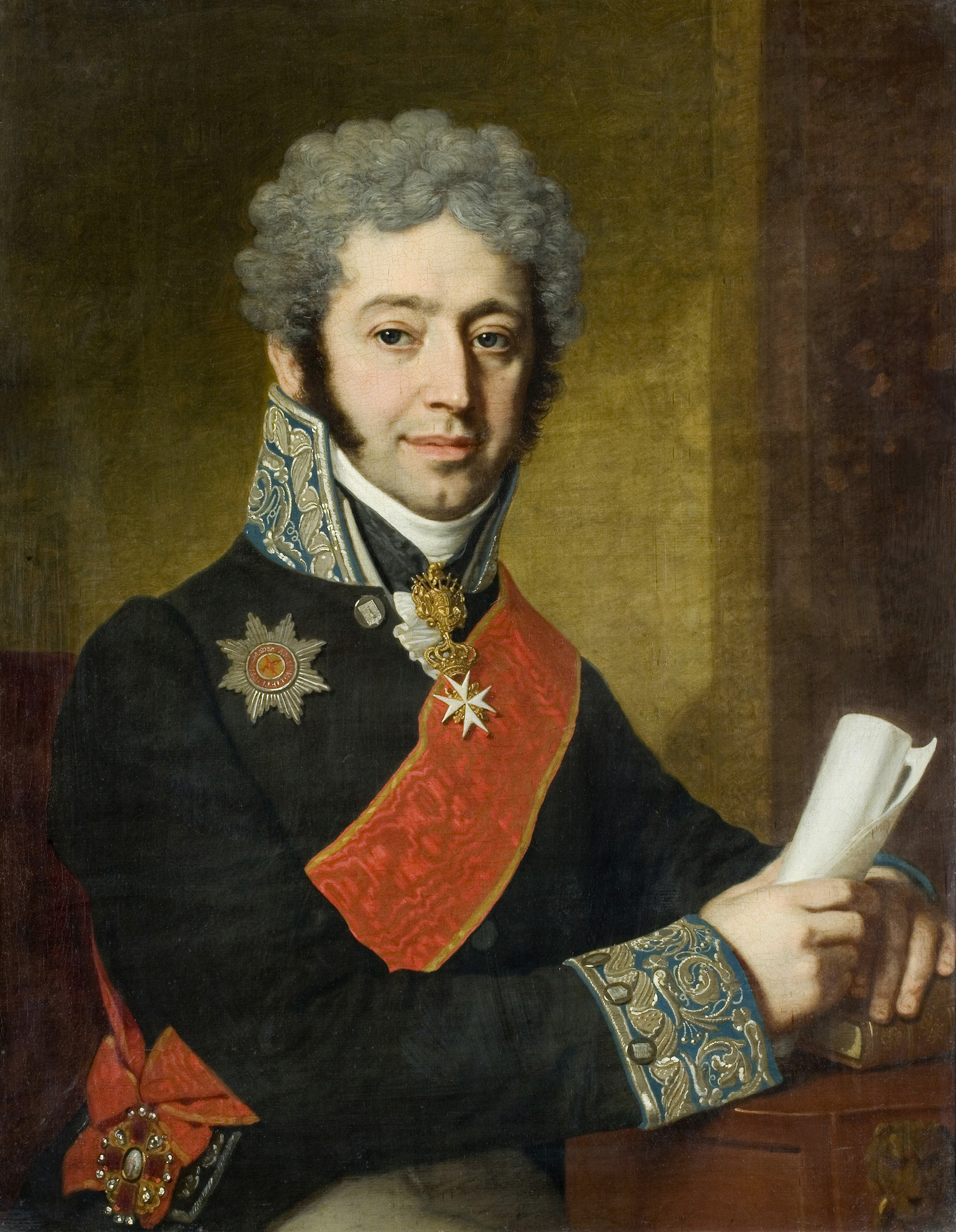

16th Prosecutor General of the Governing Senate
- In office October 18, 1827 – September 20, 1829
- Preceded by: Dmitry Lobanov–Rostovsky
- Succeeded by: Dmitry Dashkov

6th Minister of Justice of the Russian Empire
- In office October 18, 1827 – September 20, 1829
- Preceded by: Dmitry Lobanov–Rostovsky
- Succeeded by: Dmitry Dashkov

Moscow Governor
- In office May 17, 1815 – May 26, 1817
- Preceded by: Grigory Spiridov
- Succeeded by: Egor Durasov

Simbirsk Governor
- In office March 14, 1808 – May 17, 1815
- Preceded by: Sergey Khovansky
- Succeeded by: Nikolay Dubensky

Personal details
- Born: May 14, 1767
- Died: August 11, 1834 (aged 67)
- Spouse: Margarita Apayshchikova
- Relations: Dolgorukovs
- Parent: Alexey Dolgorukov (father)
- Awards: Order of Saint Alexander Nevsky; Order of Saint Vladimir; Order of Saint Anna; Order of Saint John of Jerusalem

Prince Alexey Alekseevich Dolgorukov (May 14, 1767 – August 11, 1834) was a Russian statesman, Actual Privy Councillor (1832), Simbirsk (1808–1815) and Moscow (1815–1817) Governor, Senator (1817), Prosecutor General (1827–1829), manager of the Ministry of Justice (1827–1829), member of the State Council (from 1829).

He belonged to the poor senior branch of the Dolgorukovs, descended from Prince Alexey Grigorievich, exiled to Berezov. Born in the third marriage of the latter's youngest son, Alexey (1716–1792). He had brothers, princes: Gregory, Ivan, Pavel, Yakov, Andrey and sisters, princesses: Catherine, the wife of the guard captain Peter Menshikov, and Anna, the wife of Nikolai Matrunin.

== Biography ==
According to Vigel, "up to the rank of colonel, he was in military service; but, knowing that he was born a more peaceful, albeit more active citizen than a soldier, he moved to the state one".

In the 9th year from birth, he was signed up in the artillery (January 1, 1776), from where he was subsequently transferred to the guard, in which, 15 years after the date of enlistment, he received the rank of ensign (1791). Transferred to the army regiment as prime major (1795). Received the rank of lieutenant colonel and awarded the Order of Saint Anna, 3rd Degree and Commander of the Order of Saint John of Jerusalem (1798). Promoted to colonel (October 1, 1799).

He left military service with a transfer to the rank of Actual State Councillor (July 6, 1803). He was numbered in the heraldry (1805), then appointed prosecutor in the chapter of the Order of Saint John of Jerusalem. He was appointed as the Simbirsk Civil Governor (1808). From that time on, the official activities of Prince Alexei Dolgorukov began to draw attention to themselves.

When the urgent need for food was felt on the occasion of the War in Finland and the expected break with the West, he bought bread (about 58 thousand sacks) for the treasury on favorable terms, which he delivered by water to Rybinsk and Petersburg (1808 and 1809). Assisting in the establishment of cloth factories in the Simbirsk Governorate (Ignatovka), he, with the same benefit for the treasury, supplied a considerable amount of soldier's cloth to the department of the commissariat.

Awarded with the Order of Saint Anna, 1st Degree (1810). In the Highest rescript addressed to him, gratitude was expressed to him (September 17, 1811).

He formed the Simbirsk Militia, which he commanded before going on a campaign (1812). Made the purchase of horses for cavalry and artillery at reasonable prices, despite the general shortage and high cost of horses (1813).

He was transferred as Civil Governor to Moscow (May 17, 1815). In July he moved into his governor's residence, which had been renovated after the "French Ruin". He ordered the installation of milestones along the Petersburg Highway (1816) and began repairing it within the Moscow Governorate (1818).

Thanks to his energetic economic activity, Prince Dolgorukov became known, according to Vigel, as "the greatest businessman". Granted the rank of Privy Councillor (1816), appointed Senator (1817). Awarded the Order of Saint Vladimir, 2nd Degree (1823). "The aristocracy looked at him with respectful amazement: it seemed supernatural to her that a person from among her could voluntarily and exclusively devote himself to dry and boring pursuits of jurisprudence".

Together with Senator Durov, he was sent for revision to the Vyatka Governorate (1824), to Voronezh, Penza and Simbirsk to review the provinces and to find the reasons for the escapes of the landlord peasants (1826), in the same year he revised the Kursk Governorate. For the aforementioned works, he was awarded with diamond insignia of the Order of Saint Anna, 1st Degree and the Order of Saint Alexander Nevsky (1827). Appointed Deputy Minister of Justice (April 27, 1827), Administrator of the Ministry of Justice (October 18, 1828 – 1830).

Despite the short stay of Prince Dolgorukov as the head of the Ministry of Justice (2 years), his activity did not pass without a trace, as he had to work hard on the legislative part. By order of Nicholas I, who paid special attention to the then sad state of justice, largely due to the shortcomings of legislation, in order to put in order the chaotic state of laws, the Commission of Laws was transformed into a special department of His Majesty's own Chancellery.

Under Speransky's control, the laws were quickly put in order, and the printing of the complete collection of laws (1828) began, starting with the code of Tsar Alexey Mikhailovich, and a systematic code of laws in 15 volumes was completed. To revise this code, which contained more than 42 thousand articles, a special committee was formed under the Minister of Justice, under his chairmanship. The essence of the labor assigned to the committee consisted in a detailed review of the content of the code with the aim of certifying the accuracy and completeness of the legal provisions contained in it. This extensive and painstaking work was completed during the management of the ministry by Prince Dolgorukov.

In order to speed up the final resolution of court cases, two general meetings of the Senate were formed instead of one. At the same time, the senators were obliged to meet in the Senate according to the regulations (by 9:00) and senators, chief prosecutors and chief secretaries to be in uniforms. The restructuring of the Senate building also began, due to the tightness of the building and the untidiness of the premises, which the emperor personally saw. The cost of the work together with the furnishings was estimated at 1,800,000 rubles. The work dragged on, and the building was completed (1834). During this time, the Senate was located on Vasilievsky Island in the Building of Twelve Collegiums. Dismissed from his post as Minister of Justice and appointed a member of the Council of State (September 20, 1829). Promoted to Actual Privy Councillor (April 1832).

He had a house in Moscow on the embankment of the Moskva River, in the parish of the Church of Sophia the Wisdom of God (1793).

He died on August 11, 1834, and was buried in the Church of the Holy Spirit of the Alexander Nevsky Lavra.

== Marriage and children ==
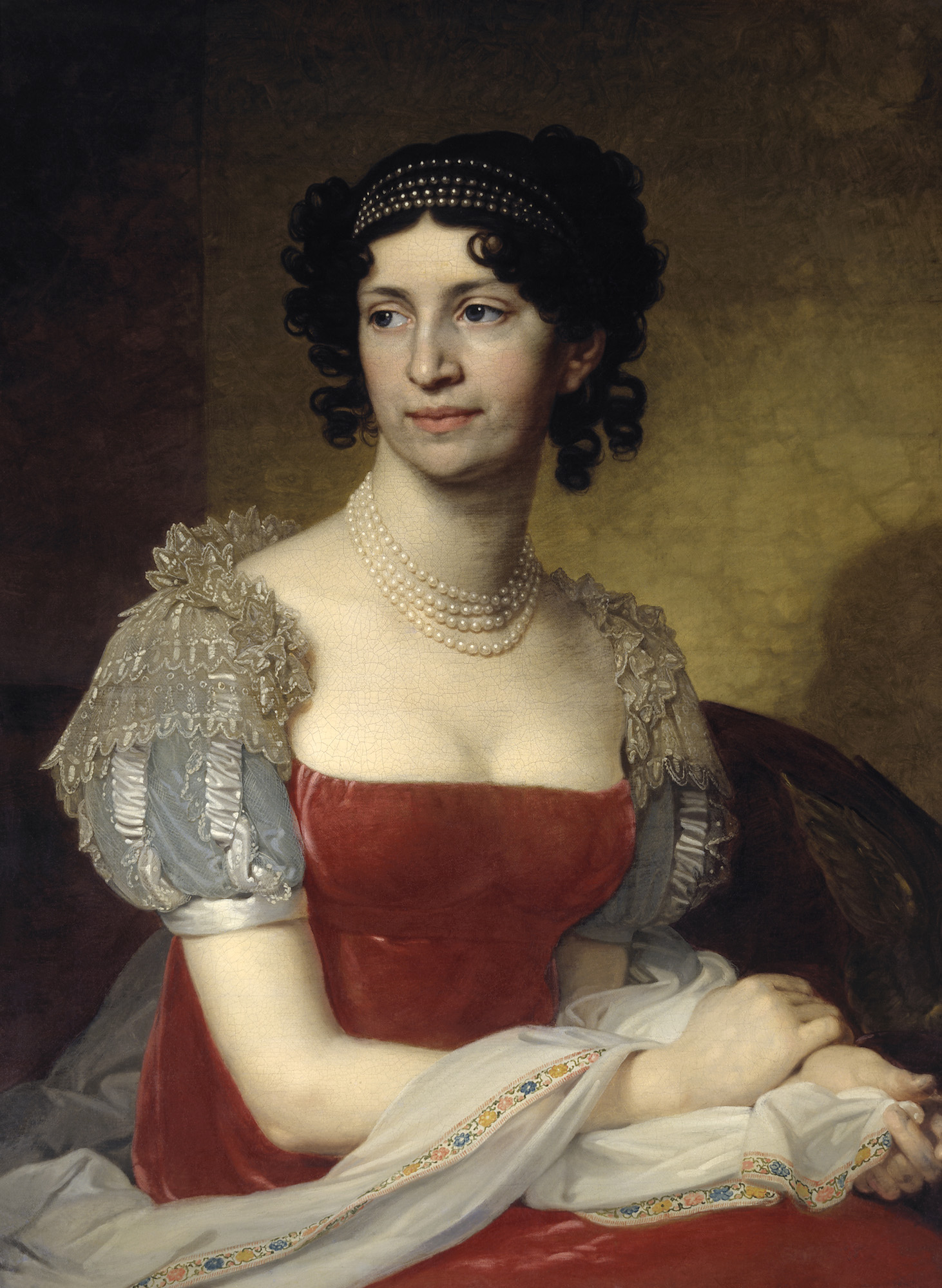
Margarita Dolgorukaya in the portrait by Borovikovsky

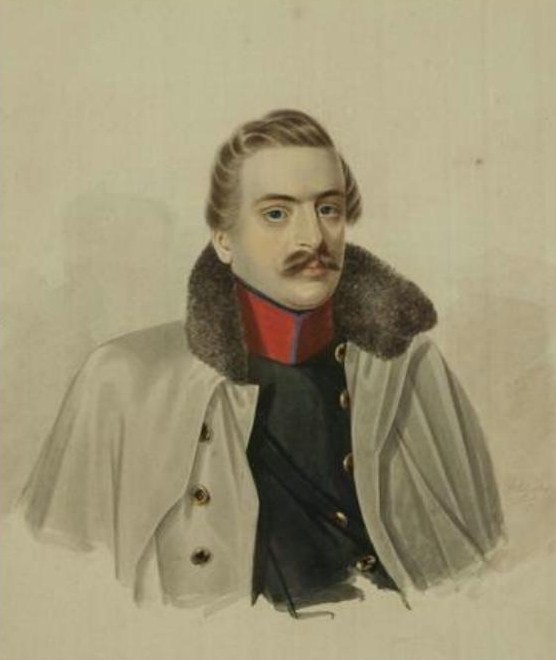
Rostislav Dolgorukov

"Even though he was a prince, he was not rich and to improve his fortune he married two merchant's daughters, which attracted him in connection with not entirely noble ones", writes Vigel. "Dolgorukov completely became a clerk when he was put in the Senate, and then he could already replace the best chief secretary".

1. Margarita Apayshchikova (1785–1814), daughter of a prominent citizen of Saint Petersburg, Merchant of the 1st Guild, the head of Saint Petersburg, Ivan Apayshchikov (1732–1793) from marriage with the daughter of a Saint Petersburg merchant Praskovya Kalitina (1746–1802). She died and was buried in Simbirsk, where her husband was the governor.

Children:

- Rostislav (January 31, 1805 – 1849), Lermontov's fellow soldier in the Life Guards Hussar Regiment. From 1833, he was married to Ekaterina Malinovskaya (1811–1872), daughter of the historian and writer Alexey Malinovsky. Endless revelry and extravagance of Prince Rostislav led to a break with his wife. Their son Vladimir (1837–1894) was married to the daughter of the Minister of War, Count Dmitry Milyutin;
- Yuri (1807–1882) – Vilna, Olonets and Voronezh Governor;
- George (March 2, 1808–?);
- Sergei (1809–1891) – Kovno, then Vitebsk Governor, Actual Privy Councillor (1872);
- Gregory (1811–1853) – Lieutenant Colonel of the General Staff, retired from 1839.

After three years of mourning, Prince Alexei Alekseevich entered (1817) a new marriage with Varvara Nikolaevna (1796–1880), daughter of Major General Nikolai Tekutyev and Princess Elizabeth Dolgorukova; since 1835, she was a lady of the Order of Saint Catherine.

In this marriage, sons were born:

- Alexey (1818–1853);
- Nikolay (1819–1887);
- Dmitry (1825–1909).

== Sources ==
- Dolgorukov, Alexey Alekseevich // Russian Biographical Dictionary: in 25 Volumes – Saint Petersburg – Moscow, 1896–1918
- Compiled by Gennady Vlasyev. Rurik's Offspring: Materials for Compiling Genealogies. Saint Petersburg. Volume 1. Princes of Chernigov. Part 3. Printing House: Partnership Roman Golike and Arthur Vilborg. 1907. Dolgorukov Alexey Alekseevich. Pages 103–104
