= Nikolay Obreskov =

Nikolay Vasilevich Obreskov
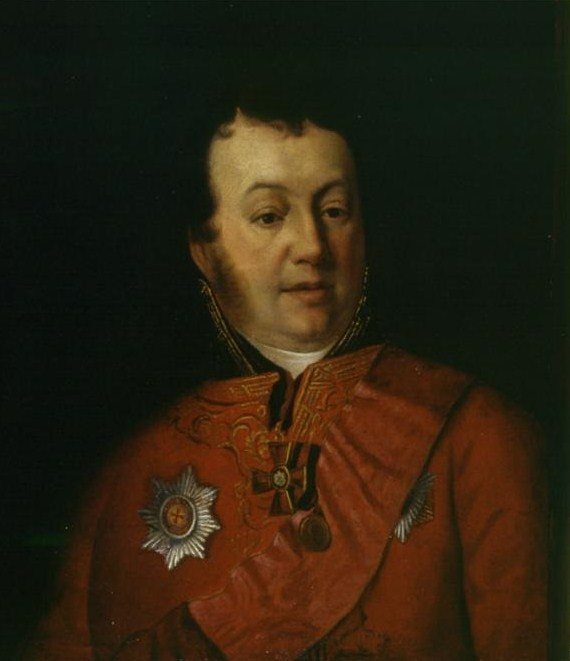

Moskva Governor
- In office June 25, 1810 – June 1, 1813
- Monarch: Aleksandr I
- Preceded by: Dmitriy Lanskoy
- Succeeded by: Grigory Spiridov

Personal details
- Born: 1764
- Died: 1821
- Relations: Obreskovs
- Parent: Vasiliy Obreskov (father)
- Awards: Order of Saint Anna; Order of Saint Vladimir; Cross for Praga; Golden Sword "For Bravery"

Military service
- Allegiance: Russian Empire
- Branch/service: Cavalry
- Years of service: 1785–1799
- Rank: Major General
- Unit: Sumy 1st Hussar Regiment

Nikolay Vasilevich Obreskov (1764 – March 1821) was a Moskva Civil Governor, Senator, and Privy Councilor from the Obreskov Family.

== Biography ==
Son of captain–lieutenant Vasiliy Obreskov, younger brother of Finnish Military Governor Aleksandr Obreskov. At the age of eight he was enlisted to serve as a page at the court of Empress Ekaterina II; nine years later he was promoted to chamber–page, and on February 18, 1785, he became a lieutenant in the Izmaylovo Life Guards Regiment.

In 1796, Obreskov took part in the War With Persia, during which he was assigned to go with a detachment to reinforce the city of Baku; he carried out this assignment very successfully, occupying Baku with his detachment on June 16 "suddenly from the enemy". In 1797, Obreskov was promoted to the rank of colonel and the following year to major general, with the appointment of commander of the Shevich Hussar Regiment.

On February 10, 1799, Obreskov was dismissed without being awarded a rank and did not hold any position until 1803, when he was elected by the Moskva Nobility to the Dmitrov District Leader of the Nobility. At the end of 1806, during the gathering of the Zemstvo Militia, Obreskov was elected and confirmed as the Dmitrov District Police Chief, and two years later as the Moskva Provincial Leader of the Nobility.

On June 25, 1810, the Highest Decree followed on the appointment of Obreskov as Moskva Civil Governor, with his promotion to Privy Councilor. In this position Obreskov showed himself on a very good side by his numerous, reasonable measures and orders and won himself the special confidence of Emperor Aleksandr I. On July 17, 1810, Obreskov was promoted to senator, with the appointment to sit in the II Division of the 6th Department of the Senat and to remain in the post of Moskva Civil Governor.

He was stationed at Borodino, commanding the 4th Infantry Regiment of the Moskva Militia, and took part in the battles at the Chirikovo Crossing, near Chernishnya and in the Battle of Tarutino. On February 17, 1813, he was awarded a gold snuffbox studded with diamonds with an imperial portrait.

The late Nikolay Vasilevich Obreskov <...> a man beautiful in his own right, a pamperer of luxury and bliss, flexible in mind and vocal in the Russian word.

— Sergey Glinka. Notes – Sankt–Peterburg: Edition of the Editorial Board of the Journal "Russian Antiquity", 1895 – Page 199

In 1816 he retired due to illness. Nominally he owned the Krivyakino Estate near Moskva, although in fact it was owned by the father of the writer Ivan Lazhechnikov. Many details about Obreskov's private life and character are contained in the memoirs of his nephew Dmitriy Sverbeev.

After his resignation, he moved to Simbirsk, where on the southern outskirts of the city he grew an orchard (called "Obreskov's Garden"). He had an estate in the village of Nikolskoe–on–Cheremshan. He died on December 13, 1817. He was buried in the family crypt in a place with his brother Aleksandr (1757–1812) in the Cemetery of the Simbirsk Intercession Monastery.

== Sources ==
- Petrov A. Obreskov Nikolay Vasilevich // Russian Biographical Dictionary: Obezyaninov – Ochkin – Sankt–Peterburg, 1905 – Pages 65–66
- Dictionary of Russian Generals, Participants of Military Operations Against the Army of Napoleon Bonaparte in 1812–1815 // Russian Archive. History of the Fatherland in Testimonies and Documents of the XVIII – XX Centuries: Collection – Moscow: Studio "Trite" by Nikita Mikhalkov, 1996 – Volume VII – Pages 493–494 – ISSN 0869–20011 (Comments by Aleksandr Podmazo)
