= Grigory Spiridov (1758) =

Moscow Civil Governor

Grigory Grigorievich Spiridov
- Григорий Григорьевич Спиридов
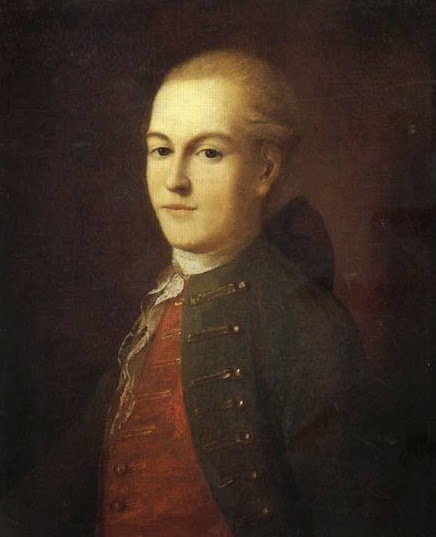

Moscow Civil Governor
- In office June 1, 1813 – 1815
- Preceded by: Nikolay Obreskov
- Succeeded by: Alexey Dolgorukov

Personal details
- Born: 1758
- Died: May 4, 1822 (aged 63–64)
- Relations: Spiridovs
- Parent: Grigory Spiridov (father)

Grigory Grigorievich Spiridov (1758–1822) was the Moscow chief of police, the actual state councilor. In 1813–15 – Moscow Civil Governor.

Representative of the noble family of the Spiridovs. The youngest of the four sons of Catherine's naval commander Grigory Spiridov from his marriage to Anna Nesterova. He began his service as a page, for a long time was an officer in the Semyonovsky Guards Regiment, with the rank of captain he took part in the Swedish War under Catherine II, and at the end of this campaign he retired with the rank of brigadier.

Moscow Chief of Police Spiridov was appointed in 1798 under Emperor Paul and held this position for three years until 1800, when his disordered health forced him to retire. But the Napoleonic Wars once again awakened a warlike spirit in him, and he, already a relatively old man, entered in 1805 and in 1812 as a volunteer in the Pereslavl Militia and in its ranks during the Patriotic War participates in numerous skirmishes with units of the French Army.

After the expulsion of the French, Spiridov, at the request of his friend Count Fyodor Rostopchin, was first appointed commandant and then civil governor of Moscow. As the latter, he contributed a lot to the restoration of the city, destroyed by the French and the Russians themselves. According to a contemporary, Spiridov in the new post:

He behaved importantly, in a governor's way, he always had a passion to contradict everyone, with him it was impossible to say a word, he had a pretense to know everything and allowed himself to express his judgments, but no one doubted his honesty.

Along with the resignation of Count Rostopchin, the Actual State Councillor Spiridov also left the service. He died on May 4, 1822, at the age of 64.

== Sources ==
- Spiridov, Grigory Grigorievich // Russian Biographical Dictionary: in 25 Volumes – Saint Petersburg, 1902 – Volume 12: Obesyaninov – Ochkin – Page 251
