= Borisovsky Uyezd =

Borisovsky Uyezd Борисовский уезд
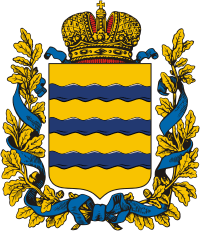
- Coat of arms
- Country: Russia
- Political status: Uyezd
- Region: European Russia
- Established: 1793
- Abolished: 1924

Area
  - Total: 10,881 km^{2} (4,201 sq mi)

Population (1897)
  - Total: 238,200
  - Density: 21.89/km^{2} (56.70/sq mi)

Borisovsky Uyezd (Russian: Борисовский уезд; Belarusian: Барысаўскі павет, romanized: Barysaŭski paviet) was one of the uyezds of Minsk Governorate and the Governorate-General of Minsk of the Russian Empire and then of Byelorussian Soviet Socialist Republic with its seat in Borisov from 1793 until its formal abolition in 1924 by Soviet authorities.

== History ==
The uyezd was founded on April 23, 1793 after the Second Partition of Poland resulted in the annexation of the territory now in central Belarus.

== Demographics ==
At the time of the Russian Empire Census of 1897, Borisovsky Uyezd had a population of 238,231. Of these, 80.9% spoke Belarusian, 11.2% Yiddish, 4.1% Polish, 3.1% Russian, 0.2% Ukrainian, 0.2% Lithuanian, 0.1% Latvian, 0.1% Tatar and 0.1% German as their native language.
