= Bobruysky Uyezd =

Former county of Minsk Governorate

Bobruysky Uyezd (Russian: Бобруйский уезд; Belarusian: Бабруйскі павет, romanized: Babrujski paviet) was one of the counties of Minsk Governorate and the Governorate-General of Minsk of the Russian Empire and then of Byelorussian Soviet Socialist Republic with its center in Bobruisk from 1793 until its formal abolition in 1924 by Soviet authorities.

== Demographics ==
At the time of the Russian Empire Census of 1897, Bobruysky Uyezd had a population of 255,935. Of these, 67.4% spoke Belarusian, 19.4% Yiddish, 10.0% Russian, 2.0% Polish, 0.5% Ukrainian, 0.3% German, 0.2% Latvian and 0.1% Tatar as their native language.
