= Mogilyovsky Uyezd (Mogilev Governorate) =

Subdivision of the Mogilev Governorate of the Russian Empire

Mogilyovsky Uyezd (Могилёвский уезд) was one of the subdivisions of the Mogilev Governorate of the Russian Empire. It was situated in the northern part of the governorate. Its administrative centre was Mogilev.

== Demographics ==
At the time of the Russian Empire Census of 1897, Mogilyovsky Uyezd had a population of 155,740. Of these, 69.9% spoke Belarusian, 21.9% Yiddish, 5.6% Russian, 1.5% Polish, 0.5% Latvian, 0.2% German, 0.2% Lithuanian and 0.1% Ukrainian as their native language.
