= Pavel Shejn =

Russian and Belarusian ethnographer

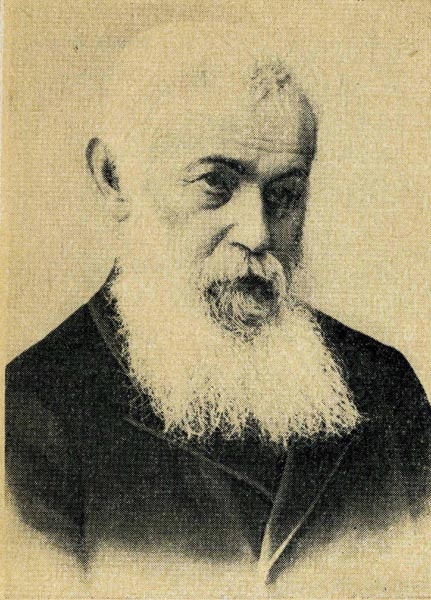

Pavel Vasilievich Shejn (Russian: Павел Васильевич Шейн, Belarusian: Павел Васілевіч Шэйн; 1826, Mogilev – 1900, Riga) was a major Russian and Belarusian ethnographer and folklorist of Jewish origin. A prolific collector of folklore himself, Shejn was equally notable for organizing and encouraging a vast network of amateur folklorists.

Pavel Shejn was born a son of a Jewish merchant in Mogilev. Due to poor health he was often unable to attend school and studied on his own. As a teenager, he studied in a Lutheran school in Moscow, and himself converted to Lutheranism. Later in life he was for some time a teacher at the school organized by Leo Tolstoy in Yasnaya Polyana. Despite the lack of formal training in philology, Shejn was an influential scholar, and his three-volume publication of Belarusian folklore remains one of the most important collections in the field.

== Literature ==
- Новиков, Н. В. Павел Васильевич Шейн : книга о собирателе и издателе русского и белорусского фольклора / Н. В. Новиков. — Минск : Вышэйшая школа, 1972. — 223 с., 1 л. п.
