= Goretsky Uyezd =

Subdivision of the Mogilev Governorate of the Russian Empire

Goretsky Uyezd (Горецкий уезд) was one of the subdivisions of the Mogilev Governorate of the Russian Empire. It was situated in the northern part of the governorate. Its administrative centre was Horki.

== Demographics ==
At the time of the Russian Empire Census of 1897, Orshansky Uyezd had a population of 122,559. Of these, 85.4% spoke Belarusian, 13.1% Yiddish, 0.8% Russian, 0.3% Polish, 0.1% Lithuanian and 0.1% Latvian as their native language.
