= Litvins of Severia =

Ліцьвіны Севершчыны
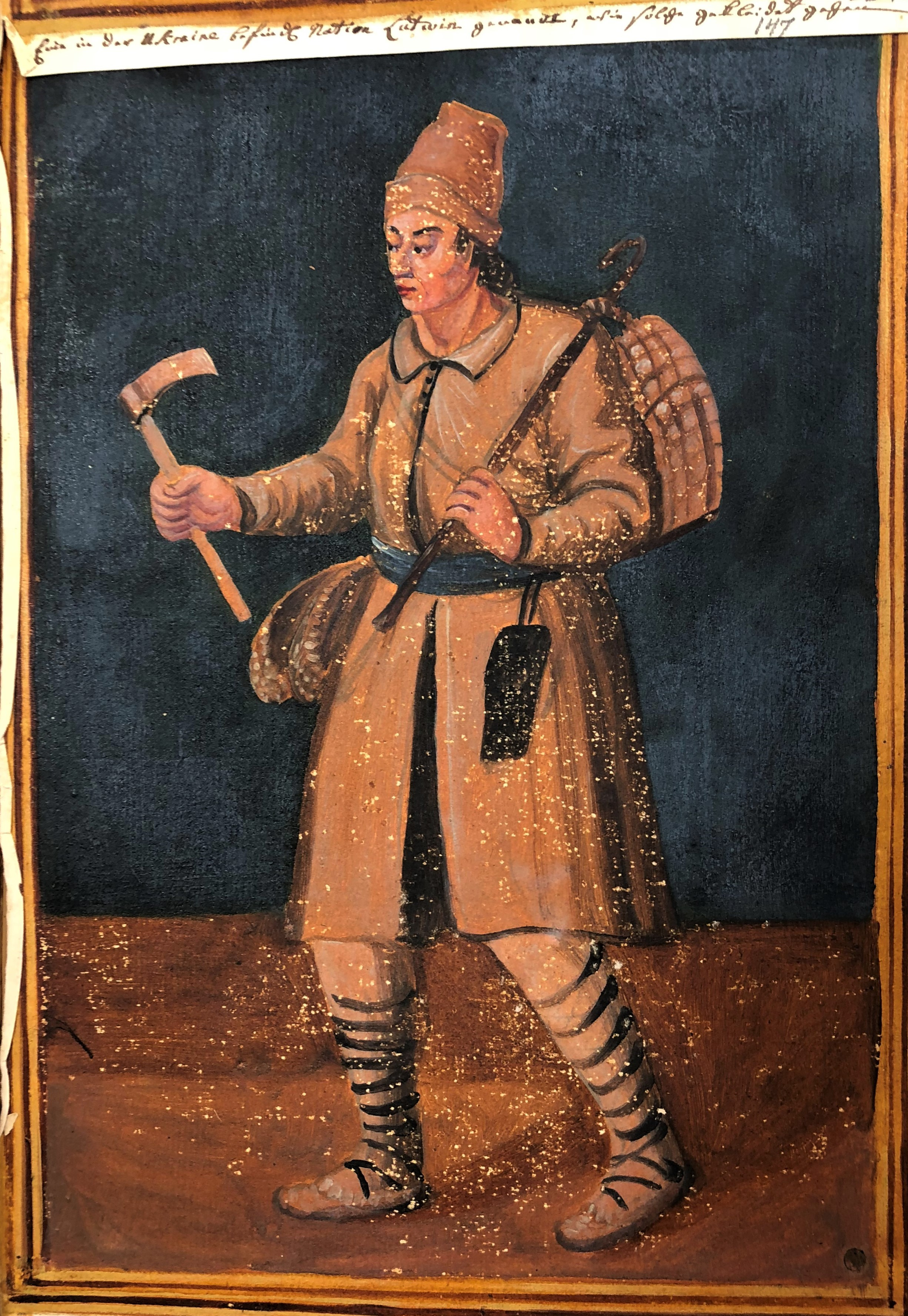
- A Lütwin (Litvin) beekeeper. One of the first ethnographic depictions of Belarusians (c. 1730–1740s).

Regions with significant populations
- Russia: (Bryansk Oblast)
- Ukraine: (Chernihiv Oblast)
- Belarus: (Gomel Region)

Languages
- Belarusian (Severian dialects), Russian, Ukrainian

Religion
- Eastern Orthodoxy

Related ethnic groups
- Belarusians, Litvins

The Litvins of Severia (Belarusian: Літвіны Севершчыны, Litviny Sievierščyny), also known as Severian Litvins, are an ethnographic group of Belarusians inhabiting the historical region of Severia. Their historical range primarily encompasses the former Starodub Powet of the Smolensk Voivodeship of the Grand Duchy of Lithuania. Today, this territory lies mostly within the Bryansk Oblast of Russia, the Chernihiv Oblast of Ukraine, and eastern Belarus.

== Etymology and identity ==
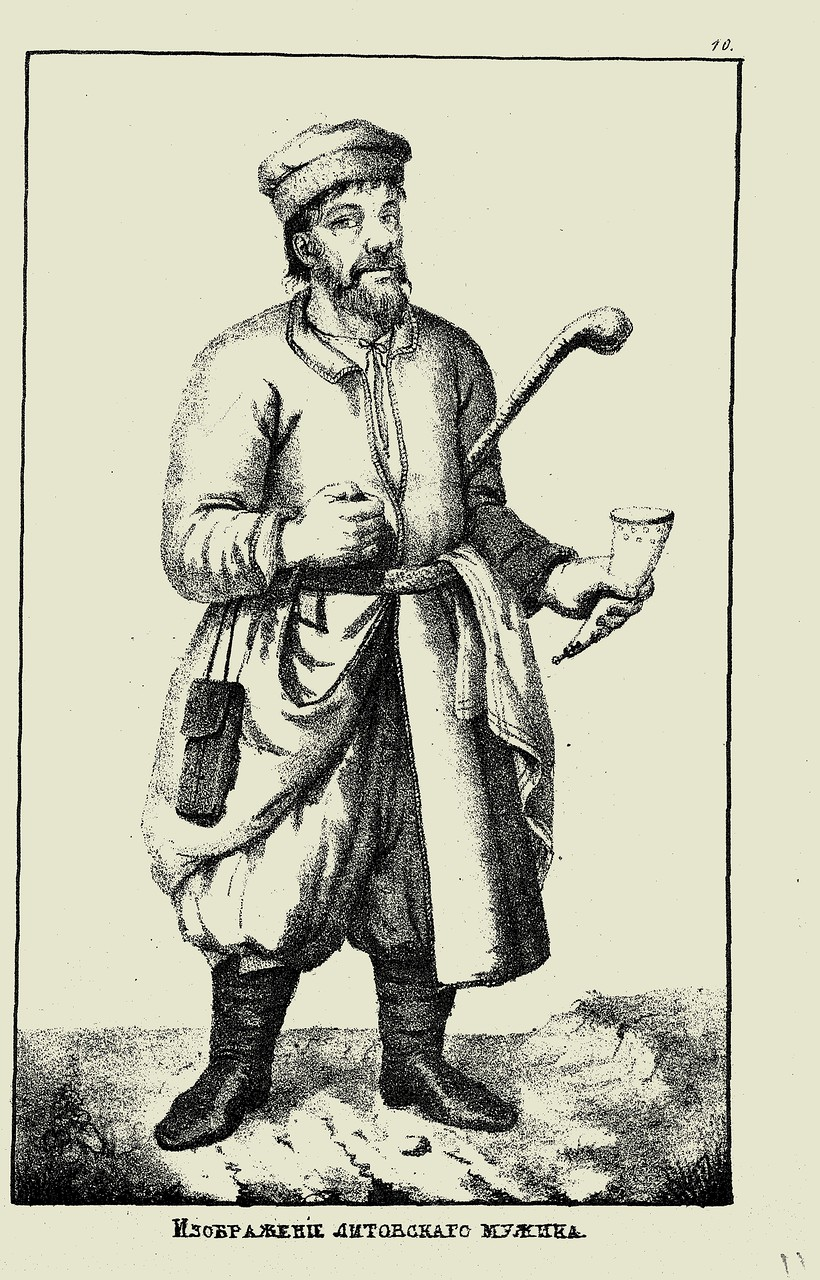
Depiction of a "Lithuanian peasant" (Litvin), likely from Severia, 1770s.

References identifying the inhabitants of Severia as Litvins (Lithuanians) appear in documents dating back to the 17th century. Records from 1628 describe individuals fleeing famine to Serpeysk:

Ivashka Yeremeyev said: by birth a Litvin of the Horodnia district... having left his children in Horodnia... went from hunger with his wife and youngest daughter Anyutka to Serpeysk... Ostashko Zhdanov said: a Litvin of the Horodnia district of the royal village of Kundino... went from hunger to feed himself in the city of Horodnia.

In 1648, a record mentions "Litvin nobility (szlachta) Voinka Pavlov son Skrotskoy of Novgorodok Seversky". In 1649, it was noted that "two Litvins arrived from Bryansk on two carts from the same village of Bykovichi [Bryansk district] with Matveev's peasant Grudinin with Ignat Mikheyev".

In a document from 1637 compiled in Bryansk, a resident of Constantinople named Rezvan is mentioned, who was "a Litvin and taken prisoner by the Turks... a Litvin by birth... and in the Lithuanian way [po litovsku] they call him Ondryushka".

Documents from the Cossack Hetmanate and the Chernihiv Consistory in 1735, 1761, and 1765 noted that the inhabitants of the Belarusian part of Severia "speak in the Lithuanian way" (Russian: говорятъ по литовску).

The term "Litvins" was introduced into scientific usage regarding the Belarusian-speaking inhabitants of Severia in the late 18th century by Apanas Shafonsky. In his 1786 description of the Chernihiv Viceroyalty, he noted that the people around Horodnia and Novoye Mesto spoke "in the Lithuanian way". In 1839, the linguist and historian Mykhaylo Maksymovych noted that in Little Russia (Ukraine), the Belarusian language was referred to as "Lithuanian," and its speakers as "Litvins." Consequently, the northwestern part of the Chernihiv Governorate was referred to as "Lithuania".

This designation was confirmed by various 19th-century ethnographers. In 1846, Grigory Esimontovsky wrote that "the entire population of the Surazh district... bears the folk name of Litvins". In 1851, Peter von Köppen noted that Belarusians, under the name of Litvins, extended into Little Russia, specifically into the Mglin and Surazh districts. In 1860, Ukrainian ethnographer Mykhaylo Levchenko observed that north of the Desna, through Starodub, Mglin, to Roslavl, the population wore a uniform costume and spoke a single dialect—Belarusian. He noted specific clothing features: "a white hat (yalamok, madzierka, mardzielka) of felt for men, a white kerchief (but not a namitka) for women — these are Litvins or Belarusians". The ethnographer Sergey Maksimov wrote in 1882 that the northern districts of the Chernihiv Governorate were inhabited by "Belarusians of a pure, unparalleled type" who, however, were unfamiliar with the official ethnonym "Belarusians" and called themselves "Litvins".

According to linguist Anton Palyavi in 1926, the inhabitants of the Novozybkov district distinguished themselves from both "Great Russians" (Muscovites) and Ukrainians. When asked about their identity, they would reportedly reply: "We are Litva, Litvins". They utilized the terms "Moskals" or "Katsaps" to refer to the Russian population. The ethnonym "Belarusians" was not widely used in the Starodub region during the late 19th and early 20th centuries due to the absence of an elitist Belarusian national revival movement in that specific area.

In 1924, Motra Lawrynenkava, a 25-year-old resident of Khorobychi (on the border of Severia and the Rechytsa region), testified: "Peasants of other Ukrainian villages call the people of Khorobychi and peasants of other places with a dialect close to Khorobychi — 'Litvins'... The people of Khorobychi call the inhabitants of the Gomel and Mogilev governorates Litvins".

== History ==
=== Early period ===
From the 9th to the 12th centuries, the territory later inhabited by the Severian Litvins was located at the borderlands of the Severians, Radimichs, and Vyatichs tribes. The area was known as Severia and was part of the Principality of Chernigov.

=== Polish–Lithuanian period ===
In the mid-14th century, Grand Duke of Lithuania Algirdas annexed Severia to the Grand Duchy of Lithuania (GDL). In the first half of the 15th century, Grand Duke Casimir granted the Bryansk lands—including Bryansk (West and East), Surazh on the Narew, Surazh on the Iput, Bielsk, and Starodub—to his uncle, the Orthodox Prince Mikhail Zhyhimontovich. Following the war in 1503, the region was ceded to the Grand Duchy of Moscow.

In the early 17th century, the northwestern districts of Severia became part of the Lithuania again (as the Starodub Powet of the Smolensk Voivodeship), confirmed by the Truce of Deulino (1618). This led to an influx of nobility from areas near Vilnius, Mazyr, and other Lithuanian locations to "ordain castles and determine the border". Cities in Severia began to receive Magdeburg rights, and Catholic churches were constructed. This period saw the settlement of Lithuanian nobility and peasants on the sparsely populated lands of Mglin and Surazh. A new urban center, Pohar, emerged.

=== Under the Russian Empire ===
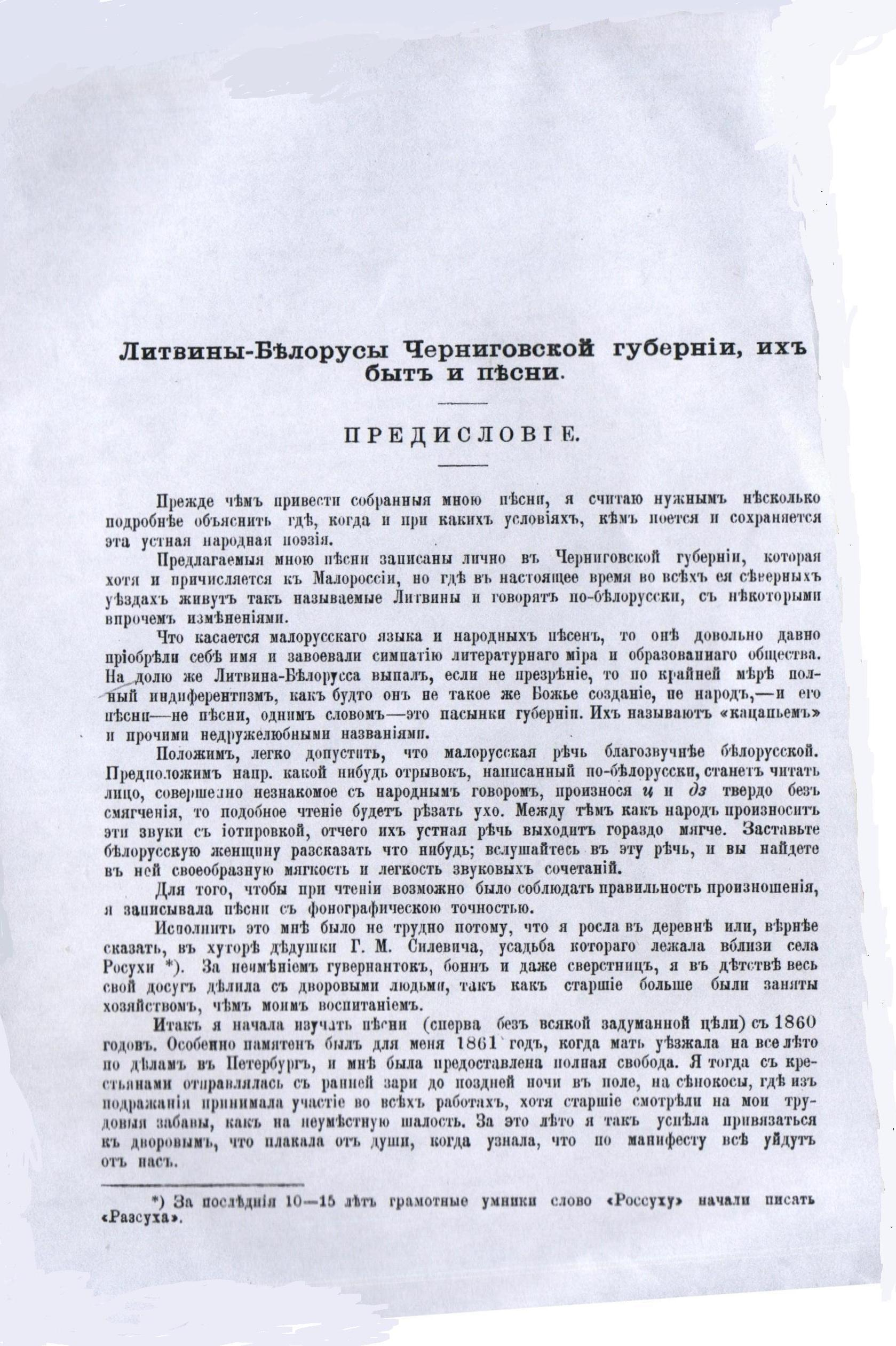
Title page of Mariya Kosich's work on Litvins-Belarusians, 1901

Following the Russo-Polish War and the Truce of Andrusovo (1667), Severia came under the control of Moscow. Until 1782, the region was part of the Cossack Hetmanate as the Starodub Cossack Regiment. During this period, the Old Belarusian language remained the language of the chancellery and church administration.

In the 19th and early 20th centuries, the Litvins of Severia inhabited the southwestern districts of the Chernihiv Governorate: Gorodnya, Mglin, Novozybkov, Starodub, and Surazh. They differed from the neighboring Russian and Ukrainian populations in clothing (wearing white homespun coats, specific headdresses like the namitka for women and magierka for men), rituals, and language (which was very close to the dialects of Northeastern Belarus).

In 1846, German historian Friedrich Kruse of the Dorpat University noted: "The true Lithuanians live in the former Voivodeships of Vilnius and Trakai, Novogrudok, Brest Litovsk, Minsk, Polotsk, Vitebsk, Mstislav and Smolensk".

Major research on the Litvins was conducted in the late 19th and early 20th centuries by Grigory Yasimantouski, Sergey Maksimov, and Alexander Rubets. Mariya Kosich published a significant monograph in 1901 titled Litvins-Belarusians of the Chernihiv Governorate: Their Life and Songs.

In 1911, Alexander Rubets published Traditions, Legends, and Tales of the Starodub Grey Past in Starodub. This book contained unique legends about the Litvins of the Bryansk region. The second legend, recorded in the village of Litovsk, involves "the Lithuanian Queen Jadwiga, the local princess Birutė, her daughter Radzislawna, Prince Syanchyla, and the knight Vrata-Smieladovič from near Vilnius".

=== Soviet era and modern times ===
After the October Revolution (1917), the territory of Severia was divided between the RSFSR and the Ukrainian SSR. In the 1920s, linguist Anton Palyavi confirmed that the language of the Novozybkov Litvins was Belarusian. During the Soviet period, Litvins-Belarusians were studied by Professor Pavel Rastarguyev and the ethnographer Aliaksandr Sieržputoŭski. In the early 1930s, a Belarusian school operated in the village of Antonovka (Popova Gora District).

After World War II, the descendants of the Litvins in Severia largely began to identify as Russians (within the RSFSR) or Ukrainians (within the Ukrainian SSR). Only a small portion of the Litvins, specifically those in villages that were incorporated into the Byelorussian SSR (such as Bausuny in the former Surazh district), joined the process of consolidation into the modern Belarusian nation.

In 1997, it was noted that representatives of the "Litvin-Belarusian" group could still be found in the Primorsky Krai of Russia, having migrated there from the northwestern districts of the Chernihiv Governorate.

== See also ==
- Litvins
- Prussian Lithuanians
- Ethnographic Lithuania

== Bibliography ==
- Катлярчук, А. (2001). Беларусы бранскага краю [Belarusians of the Bryansk region]. ARCHE Пачатак (in Belarusian) (2 (16)). Archived from the original on 2015-12-22.
- Косич, М. Н. (1902). Литвины-белорусы Черниговской губернии, их быт и песни [Litvins-Belarusians of the Chernihiv Governorate, their life and songs] (in Russian). СПб.
- Васькоў, Уладзімір (2010). Літвіны Севершчыны [Litvins of Severia]. Вялікае Княства Літоўскае: Энцыклапедыя (in Belarusian). Vol. 3. Мінск: Беларуская Энцыклапедыя. p. 306.
