= Zakhary Korneev =

Belarusian polymath

Zakhary Yakovlevich Korneev
- Захарий Яковлевич Корнеев
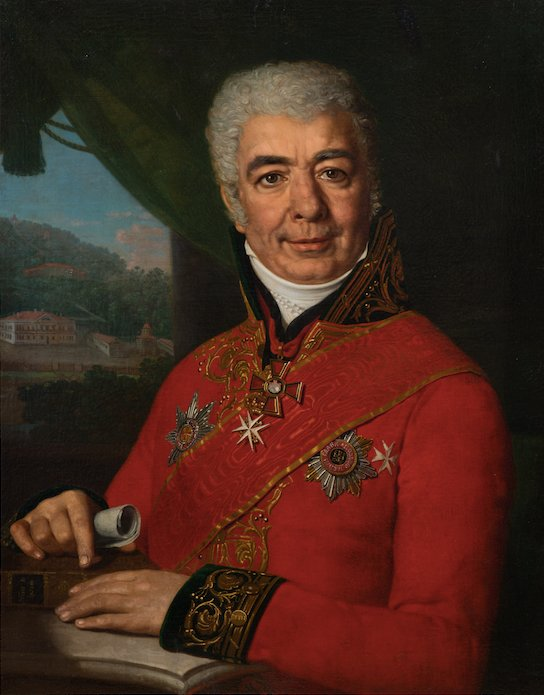

2nd Trustee of the Kharkov Educational District
- In office 1817–1822
- Preceded by: Severin Potocki
- Succeeded by: Ivan Orlay

2nd Minsk Governor
- In office 1796–1806
- Monarchs: Pavel I Alexander I
- Preceded by: Ivan Neplyuev
- Succeeded by: Herman Rading

4th Oryol Vice–Governor
- In office 1785 – January 18, 1797
- Governor: Abraham Lopukhin; Semyon Neplyuev; Sergey Brianchaninov; Alexander Kvashnin–Samarin
- Preceded by: Pyotr Novosilydov
- Succeeded by: Pavel Protasov

Personal details
- Born: 1748 Zakharyevskoye, Bogodukhovsky Uyezd, Kharkov Governorate
- Died: 1828 (aged 79–80) Zakharyevskoye, Bogodukhovsky Uyezd

Military service
- Allegiance: Russian Empire
- Branch/service: Army
- Years of service: 1775
- Rank: Colonel

Zakhary Yakovlevich (Emmanuilovich) Korneev (Russian: Заха́рий Я́ковлевич (Эммануи́лович) Корне́ев; 1748–1828) was the first civil governor of Minsk and the Minsk Governorate (1796–1806), later a trustee of the Kharkov Educational District (1817–1822), a writer. Senator, Privy Councillor since 1802.

== Biography ==
Zakhary Yakovlevich Korneev (according to other sources – "Karneev") – was in military service since 1775. A well–known mason in his time. In 1775, he was sent to the Nekrasov's Cossacks to return them to Russian citizenship.

In 1782, he was appointed director of the economy (that is, a member of the state chamber) in the Kursk Governorate. In 1785, he was appointed Vice–Governor of Oryol.

In January 1793, Minsk (as part of the central part of Belarus) was annexed to the Russian Empire as a result of the 2nd Partition of the Commonwealth, and on April 3 of the same year became the center of the new Minsk Governorate. And in 1796 Korneev became the first governor in Minsk.

In 1805, thanks to the care of the governor Korneev, the governor's garden was founded (later called the city garden; today – the Park Named After Maxim Gorky). At the same time, the foundation was laid for another square, which in 1870 received the name Aleksandrovsky. Under him, the redevelopment of Minsk began. The main street of Minsk, laid in the middle of the 16th century as a section of the Moscow–Vienna postal route, was replanned under Korneev and named Zakharyevskaya in his honor. Today it is the main and central avenue of Minsk – Independence Avenue, about 15 kilometers long.

He was granted with the coat of arms of the nobility on December 21, 1802.

In 1808, Zakhary Korneev was appointed a senator, and in 1810, a member of the State Council.

In 1810, he was the successor of the son of Vasily Dzhunkovsky – Alexander.

In 1815, at the suggestion of Prince Alexander Golitsyn, Korneev became one of the vice–presidents of the Russian Bible Society. In 1817, Golitsyn appointed him a trustee of the Kharkov Educational District.

== Works ==
- Zakhary Karneev. Thoughts Poured Out While Reading the Lord's Prayer: Our Father – Saint Petersburg: Printing House of the Academy of Sciences, 1814 – 23 Pages – (the author was identified according to Boris Modzalevsky's article "Labzin" in the Russian Biographical Dictionary);
- Zakhary Karneev. My Concepts of the Creed: Composition of the Author of Thoughts Poured Out During the Prayer of Our Father – Saint Petersburg: Printed at the Imperial Academy of Sciences, 1814 – 46 Pages – (the author was established from the publication: Masanov. Dictionary of Pseudonyms – Volume 1 – Moscow, 1956).

Correspondence with Karneev of Prince Alexander Golitsyn and Alexander Labzin is published in the Russian Archive (1892, No. 12 and 1833, No. 5).

== Gallery ==
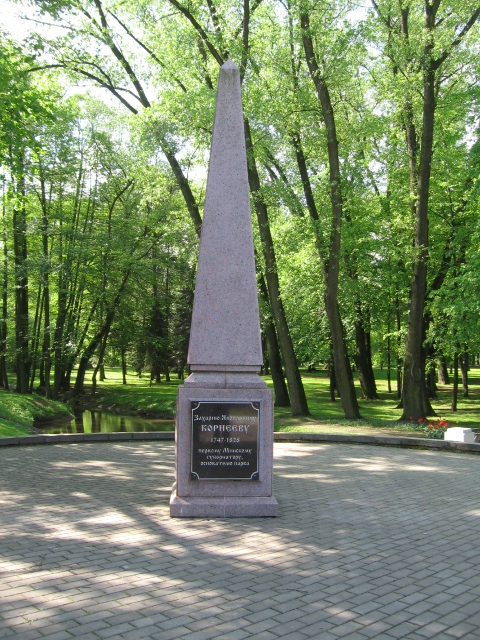
Monument to Korneev in Gorky Park, Minsk

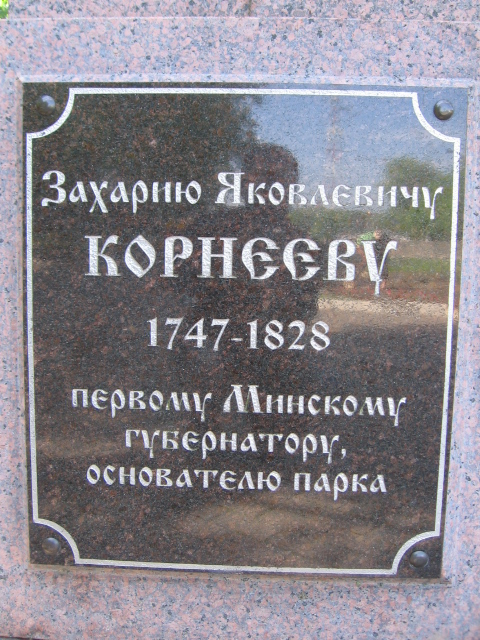
Plaque on the monument in Gorky Park, Minsk

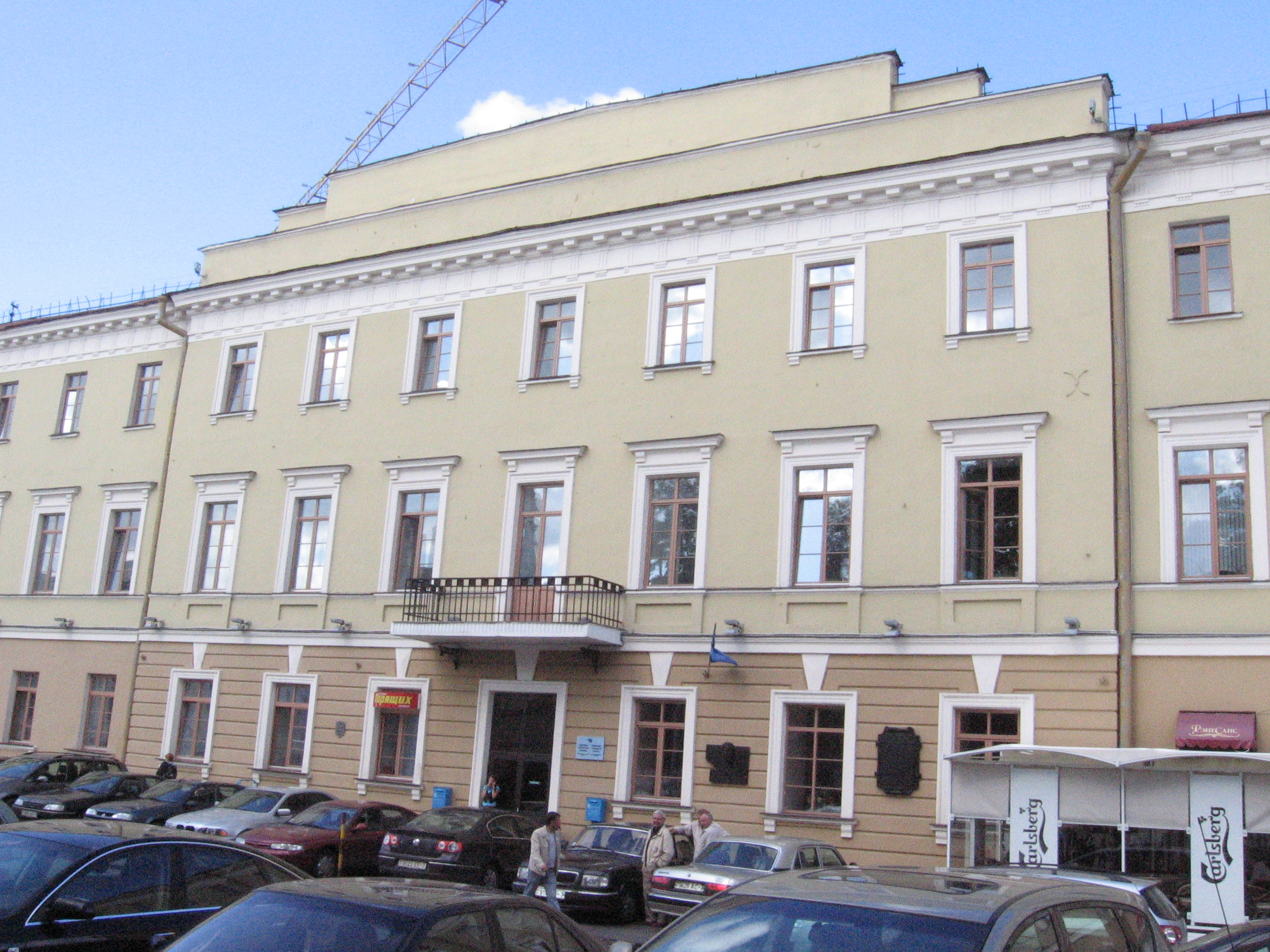
The building of the Minsk gymnasium, opened under Korneev in 1803

== Sources ==
- Shchelkov I. From the history of Kharkov University // Journal of the Ministry of National Education. - 1890. - No. 10.
- Brigadin P. I., Lukashevich A. M. “Full of honesty and rare abilities for service”: Zakhar Karneev // Brigadin P. I., Lukashevich A. M. Minsk governors: the history of power. - Minsk: State Institute of Management and Social Technologies of the Belarusian State University, 2009. - P. 23–38.
