= Rechitsky Uyezd =

Rechitsky Uyezd (Russian: Речицкий уезд; Belarusian: Рэчыцкі павет, romanized: Rečycki paviet) was one of the Uyezds of Minsk Governorate and the Governorate-General of Minsk of the Russian Empire and then of Byelorussian Soviet Socialist Republic with its center in Rechytsa from 1793 until its formal abolition in 1924 by Soviet authorities.

== Demographics ==
At the time of the Russian Empire Census of 1897, Rechitsky Uyezd had a population of 221,771. Of these, 82.5% spoke Belarusian, 12.8% Yiddish, 1.7% Ukrainian, 1.4% Russian, 1.1% Polish, 0.2% Czech, 0.1% Latvian, 0.1% German and 0.1% Romani as their native language.
