= Mozyrsky Uyezd =

Uyezd of Minsk Governorate, Russian Empire

Mozyrsky Uyezd (Russian: Мозырский уезд; Belarusian: Мазырскі павет, romanized: Mazyrski paviet) was one of the uyezds of Minsk Governorate and the Governorate-General of Minsk of the Russian Empire and then of Byelorussian Soviet Socialist Republic with its seat in Mozyr from 1793 until its formal abolition in 1924 by Soviet authorities.

== Demographics ==
At the time of the Russian Empire Census of 1897, Mozyrsky Uyezd had a population of 181,161. Of these, 79.5% spoke Belarusian, 16.3% Yiddish, 2.1% Polish, 1.5% Russian, 0.3% German, 0.1% Ukrainian, 0.1% Latvian and 0.1% Czech as their first language.
