= Cherikovsky Uyezd =

Uyezd of the Russian Empire

Cherikovsky Uyezd (Чериковский уезд) was one of the subdivisions of the Mogilev Governorate of the Russian Empire. It was situated in the eastern part of the governorate. Its administrative centre was Cherykaw.

== Demographics ==
At the time of the Russian Empire Census of 1897, Cherikovsky Uyezd had a population of 150,277. Of these, 89.6% spoke Belarusian, 8.6% Yiddish, 0.7% Russian, 0.4% Polish, 0.3% Ukrainian, 0.2% Lithuanian and 0.1% Latvian as their native language.
