= Minsk Governorate =

1793–1921 unit of Russia

Coordinates: 53.9022°N 27.5618°E

Minsk Governorate Минская губерния
- Governorate of the Russian Empire
- 1793–1921
- Coat of arms

- Location in the Russian Empire
- Capital: Minsk
- Area
- 91,213 km^{2} (35,218 sq mi)
- Population
- 2,539,100
- History
  - Established: 23 March 1793
  - Disestablished: 1921
Preceded by
Minsk Voivodeship
Succeeded by
Minsk Okrug
Slutsk Okrug
Bobruysk Okrug
Polissia Okruha
Borisov Okrug
Gomel Governorate
Polesie Voivodeship
- Today part of: Belarus

Minsk Governorate (Note: Russian: Минская губерния, romanized: Minskaya guberniya; Belarusian: Мінская губерня) was an administrative-territorial unit (guberniya) of the Russian Empire, with its capital in Minsk. It was created from the land acquired in the partitions of Poland and existed from 1793 until 1921. Its territory covered the majority of modern-day Belarus.

== Administrative divisions ==
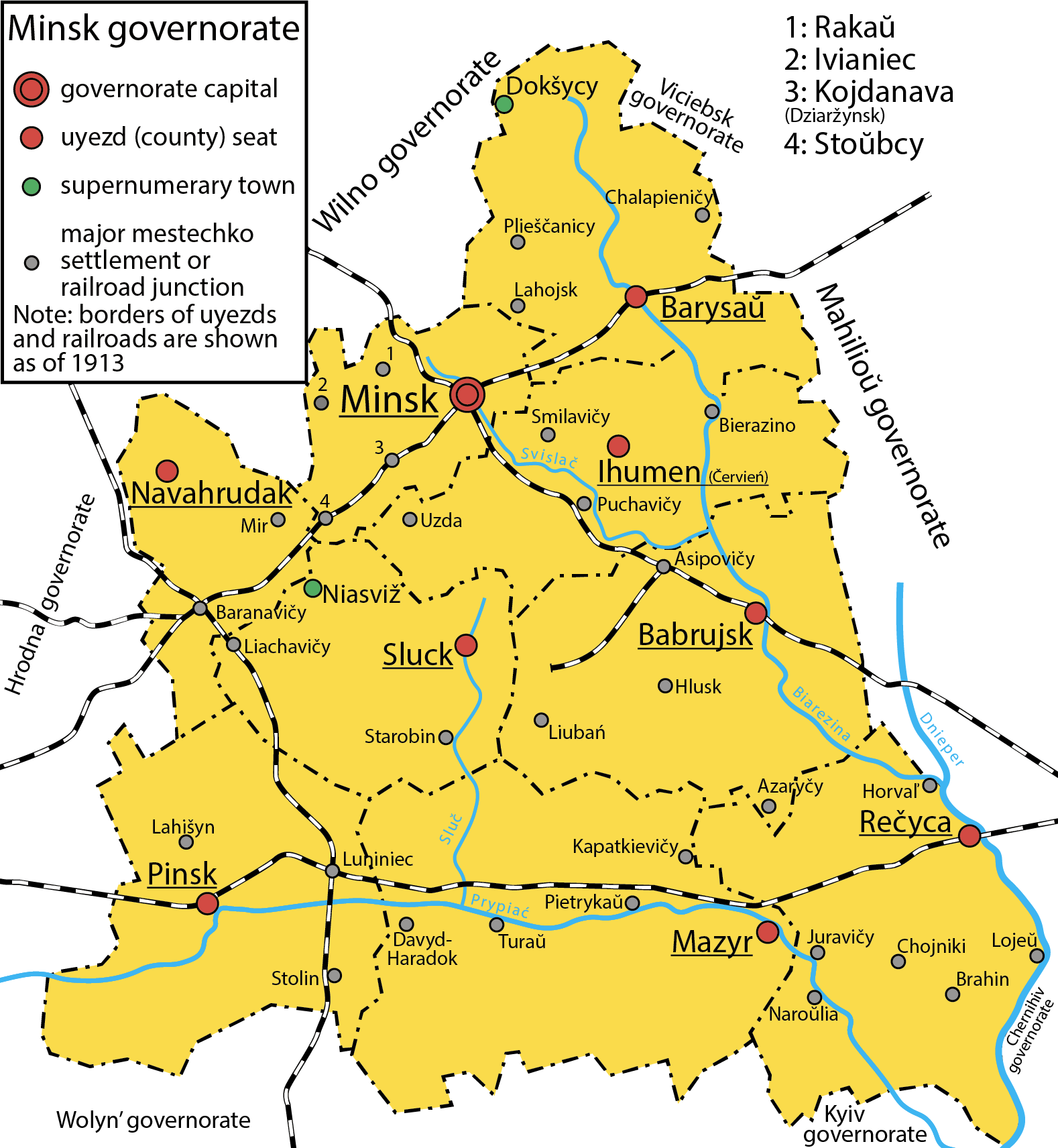
Uyezds of Minsk Governorate in 1913

- Bobruysky Uyezd
- Borisovsky Uyezd
- Igumensky Uyezd
- Minsky Uyezd
- Mozyrsky Uyezd
- Novogrudsky Uyezd (part of Grodno Governorate before 1843)
- Pinsky Uyezd
- Rechitsky Uyezd
- Slutsky Uyezd

Vileysky and Disnensky Uyezds passed to the Vilna Governorate in 1843. In 1919, Baranovichsky Uyezd was created from Novogorodoksky Uyezd and Nesvizhsky Uyezd was created from Slutsky Uyezd. In 1920, Novogrudoksky, Pinsky, Baranovichsky, and Nesvizhsky Uyezds were controlled by Poland.

== Demographics ==
According to the 1897 imperial census, Minsk Governorate had a population of 2,147,621. The ethnic makeup (based on native language) was as follows:

County	Belarusians	Jews	Russians	Poles	Ukrainians
(total)	76,0 %	16,0 %	3,9 %	3,0 %	…
Bobruysky Uyezd	67,4 %	19,4 %	10,0 %	2,0 %	…
Borisovsky Uyezd	80,9 %	11,2 %	3,1 %	4,1 %	…
Igumensky Uyezd	82,6 %	12,3 %	1,8 %	2,9 %	…
Minsky Uyezd	59,2 %	23,1 %	9,5 %	7,1 %	…
Mozyrsky Uyezd	79,5 %	16,3 %	1,5 %	2,1 %	…
Novogrudsky Uyezd	83,7 %	12,3 %	1,6 %	1,7 %	…
Pinsky Uyezd	74,3 %	19,5 %	2,6 %	2,6 %	…
Rechitsky Uyezd	82,5 %	12,8 %	1,4 %	1,1 %	1,7 %
Slutsky Uyezd	78,5 %	15,7 %	1,8 %	2,8 %	…

== Industry ==
Minsk province has mostly swampy terrain and clay soil, but the climate is favorable for agriculture. Flax and hemp were planted for home use.

Horticulture is common everywhere, primarily in the form of subsistence farming. In the city of Minsk, horticulture is mainly done by Tatars, in Bobruysk by Old Believers. Horticulture spread everywhere, but it was not lacking in industrial character, it is a special property of every household, starting with a peasant and ending with a rich landowner. One feature of horticulture in the Minsk provinces was that each gardener tried to grow as many different fruit trees as possible. Since horticulture was not of an industrial nature, fruits were imported from Little Russia.

Beekeeping was spread throughout the province, although it was not of an industrial nature. In 1897, there were 11,740 beekeepers.

Forestry, which was exclusively practiced by Jews, played a significant role.

Cattle breeding and sheep breeding was widespread throughout the province.

Factory and similar industry is limited only to the needs of its own province. In 1860, there were 594 factories and plants; in 1879 — 623; in 1895 — 378; in 1912 — 493.

In 1912, there were 61,485 artisans, 20,842 of them in cities.

== Governors ==
- Ivan Nikolaevich Neplyuev
- Zakhary Korneev (1796-1807)
- Sergey Khovansky (March-December 1808)
- Hermann Ivanovich Rading (1808 - 21 May 1812)
- Pavel Mikhailovich Dobrinsky (21 May 1812 - 1815)
- Kazimir Aloisovich Sulistrovsky (1815-1818)
- Vikenty Ivanovich Gechevich (1818-1831)
- Kirill Yakovlevich Tyufyaev (16 March – 26 April 1831)
- Alexander Fyodorovich Drebush (26 April 1831 – 12 January 1835)
- Sergei Ivanovich Davydov (12 January 1835 - 1838)
- Nikolai Vasilyevich Sushkov (16 December 1838 - 1841)
- Vacant (1841 - 19 November 1842)
- Gustav Fyodorovich Doppelmeyer (19 November 1842 – 2 May 1844)
- Alexey Vasilyevich Semyonov (2 May 1844 – 26 January 1850)
- Zakhar Semyonovich Kherkheulidzev (27 January – 21 April 1850)
- Fedot Nikolaevich Shklarevich (21 April 1850 – 18 October 1857)
- Ivan Andreevich Rosset (18 October 1857 – 3 February 1858)
- Eduard Fyodorovich Keller (27 May 1861 – 8 February 1858)
- Sergei Yegorovich Kushelev (14 November 1861 – 13 June 1862)
- Andrey Lvovich Kozhevnikov (15 June 1862 – 3 April 1864)
- Pavel Nikonorovich Shelgunov (24 May 1864 – 19 May 1868)
- Egor Aleksandrovich Kasinov (19 May 1868 – 21 August 1869)
- Vladimir Nikolaevich Tokarev (2 November 1869 – 24 October 1875)
- Valery Ivanovich Charykov (5 December 1875 – 30 August 1879)
- Alexander Pietrov (30 August 1879 – 30 January 1886)
- Nikolai Nikolaevich Trubetskoy (11 February 1886 – 20 July 1902)
- Alexander Alexandrovich Musin-Pushkin (13 August 1902 – 16 May 1905)
- Pavel Grigorievich Kurlov (16 May 1905 – 15 July 1906)
- Yakov Egorovich Erdely (15 July 1906 – 26 November 1912)
- Alexey Fedorovich Girs (26 November 1912 - 1915)
- Andrey Gavriilovich Chernyavsky (30 October 1915 – 15 August 1916)
- Vladimir Andreevich Drutskoy-Sokolinsky (August 1916 - 1917)
