= Slutsky Uyezd =

Slutsky Uyezd (Russian: Слуцкий уезд; Belarusian: Слуцкі павет, romanized: Slucki paviet) was one of the uyezds of Minsk Governorate of the Minsk viceroyalty (namestnichestvo) in Russian Empire and later in Byelorussian Soviet Socialist Republic with its center in Slutsk from 1793 until its abolition in 1924. Its territory was incorporated into Slutsk okrug.

== Demographics ==
At the time of the Russian Empire Census of 1897, Slutsky Uyezd had a population of 260,499. Of these, 78.5% spoke Belarusian, 15.7% Yiddish, 3.5% Polish, 1.8% Russian, 0.8% Ukrainian, 0.3% Tatar and 0.1% German as their native language.
