= Gomelsky Uyezd =

Subdivision of the Mogilev Governorate of the Russian Empire

Gomelsky Uyezd (Гомельский уезд) was one of the subdivisions of the Mogilev Governorate of the Russian Empire. It was situated in the southern part of the governorate. Its administrative centre was Gomel.

== Demographics ==
At the time of the Russian Empire Census of 1897, Gomelsky Uyezd had a population of 224,723. Of these, 74.1% spoke Belarusian, 14.4% Yiddish, 9.7% Russian, 1.0% Polish, 0.5% Ukrainian, 0.1% German and 0.1% Romani as their native language.
