= Belarus Governorate =

1796–1802 unit of Russia

Belarus Governorate (Note: Russian: Белорусская губерния, romanized: Belorusskaya guberniya; Belarusian: Беларуская губерня) was an administrative-territorial unit (guberniya) of the Russian Empire established on December 12, 1796. It included the lands acquired after the Second Partition of Poland.

It was dissolved on February 27, 1802, after an administrative reform, split into Vitebsk Governorate and Mogilev Governorate.
