= Pinsky Uyezd =

Pinsky Uyezd (Russian: Пинский уезд; Belarusian: Пінскі павет, romanized: Pinski paviet) was one of the counties of Minsk Governorate and the Governorate-General of Minsk of the Russian Empire and then of Byelorussian Soviet Socialist Republic with its center in Pinsk from 1793 until its formal abolition in 1924 by Soviet authorities.

== Demographics ==
At the time of the Russian Empire Census of 1897, Pinsky Uyezd had a population of 230,763. Of these, 74.3% spoke Belarusian, 19.5% Yiddish, 2.6% Polish, 2.6% Russian, 0.6% Ukrainian and 0.2% German as their native language.
