= Chaussky Uyezd =

Chaussky Uyezd (Чаусский уезд) was one of the subdivisions of the Mogilev Governorate of the Russian Empire. It was situated in the northern part of the governorate. Its administrative centre was Chavusy.

== Demographics ==
At the time of the Russian Empire Census of 1897, Chaussky Uyezd had a population of 88,686. Of these, 89.6% spoke Belarusian, 8.3% Yiddish, 0.7% Russian, 0.5% Lithuanian, 0.4% Latvian and 0.4% Polish as their first language.
