= Bykhovsky Uyezd =

Subdivision of the Mogilev Governorate of the Russian Empire

Bykhovsky Uyezd (Быховский уезд) was one of the subdivisions of the Mogilev Governorate of the Russian Empire. It was situated in the central part of the governorate. Its administrative centre was Bykhaw (Bykhov).

== Demographics ==
At the time of the Russian Empire Census of 1897, Bykhovsky Uyezd had a population of 124,820. Of these, 88.2% spoke Belarusian, 9.2% Yiddish, 0.8% Russian, 0.8% Latvian, 0.5% Polish, 0.4% Ukrainian and 0.1% Lithuanian as their native language.
