= Mogilev Governorate =

1772–1919 unit of Russia

Coordinates: 53.9167°N 30.3500°E

Mogilev Governorate Могилёвская губерния
- Governorate
- Coat of arms

- Location in the Russian Empire
- Country: Russian Empire
- Krai: Northwestern
- Established: 1772
- Abolished: 1919
- Capital: Mogilev

Area
  - Total: 48,047.50 km^{2} (18,551.24 sq mi)

Population (1897)
  - Total: 1,686,764
  - Density: 35.10618/km^{2} (90.92458/sq mi)
  - Urban: 8.73%
  - Rural: 91.27%

The Mogilev Governorate (Note: Russian: Могилёвская губе́рния, pre-1918: Могилёвская губернія, romanized: Mogilyovskaya gubérniya; Belarusian: Магілёўская губе́рня, romanized: Mahilioŭskaja hubiérnja) was an administrative-territorial unit (guberniya) of the Northwestern Krai of the Russian Empire. The governorate bordered the Vitebsk Governorate to the north, the Smolensk Governorate to the east, the Chernigov Governorate to the south, and the Minsk Governorate to the west. Its capital was Mogilev, also referred to as Mogilev-on-the-Dnieper, or Mogilev Gubernskiy. The area of the Mogilev Governorate covered concomitant Belarus' Vitebsk, Mogilev and Gomel Regions.

The area of the governorate was inhabited in the 10th century by the Slav tribes of the Krivichi and Radimichi. In the 14th century, the land became part of Lithuania, and later Poland. The governorate was formed in 1772, in the aftermath of the First partition of Poland, from parts of the voivodeships of Witebsk, Mścisław, Połock and Inflanty. Parts of these territories were also used to form the Pskov Governorate. In 1796, Mogilev and Polotsk Governorates were united and formed Belorussian Governorate. In 1802, the Belorussian Governorate was divided into Vitebsk Governorate and Mogilev Governorate. In 1917, Vitebsk, Mogilev and parts of Minsk Governorate and Vilna Governorate were united into the Western District (from 1918 known as Western Komuna). In 1918, it was joined by Smolensk Governorate and in October 1919, Mogilev Governorate was reformed into Gomel Governorate.

== Subdivisions ==
- Bykhovsky Uyezd
- Gomelsky Uyezd
- Goretsky Uyezd
- Klimovichskiy Uyezd
- Mogilyovsky Uyezd
- Mstislavsky Uyezd
- Orshansky Uyezd
- Rogachev Uezd
- Sennensky Uyezd
- Chaussky Uyezd
- Cherikovsky Uyezd
