= Ukrainians in Belarus =

Ethnic group in Belarus

Білоруські українці
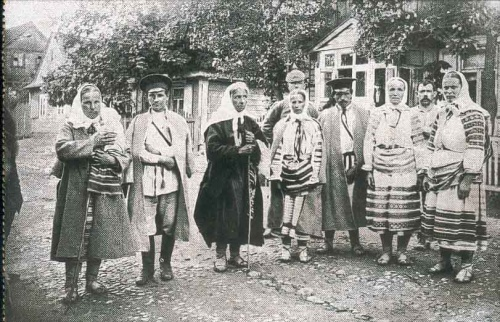
- Polishchuks in Kobryn, c. 1916

Total population
- 158,723 (2009, census)

Languages
- Belarusian, Russian, Ukrainian, Polesian

Religion
- Christianity (primarily Eastern Orthodox, Greek Catholic minority)

Related ethnic groups
- Ukrainians, Ukrainian diaspora

Ukrainians in Belarus (Note: Ukrainian: білоруські українці, biloruski ukrayintsi Belarusian: беларускія ўкраінцы, bielaruskija ŭkraincy Russian: белорусские украинцы, byelorusskiye ukraintsy) comprise one of the largest ethnic minorities in Belarus, making up 1.7% of the population as of the 2009 census at 158,723 people. The largest concentration of Ukrainians is in Brest Region, where they make up 2.9% of the population. The largest share of Ukrainians in the country was recorded in Kamieniets, Brest, Kobryn, and Zhabinka districts.

== History ==
The majority of Ukrainians living in Belarus today are descendants of migrants from Ukraine, occurring due to the fact that Ukraine and Belarus were for centuries part of the same state. It is also known that many Zaporozhian Cossacks settled in the Dnieper region in the 17th century. The last significant wave of immigrants from Ukraine arrived in Belarus during the Soviet Union.

Ethnic Ukrainians living in the territory of modern-day Belarus are often singled out as a separate group. However, due to the cultural proximity and similarity of Belarusians and Ukrainians, difficulties arise in drawing ethnic boundaries between the two. For many years, Belarusians and Ukrainians were not separated in documents. The identification of the two peoples took place, as a rule, on the basis of common religion (Eastern Orthodox and Greek Catholic Christianity) and under the common name of Ruthenians, Tutejszy, or Poleshuks.

Variants of the Ukrainian-Belarusian linguistic border as determined by language scholars, superimposed on the modern political borders

The historically Ukrainian-populated region of Belarus, located between Yaselda river and Podlachia in the west and Pina rever and Pinsk in the east, forms a part of Polesia and is traditionally known as Zahoroddia (Ukrainian: Загороддя). The Ukrainian-Belarusian linguistic border in the area is usually considered to follow the Narew river, and then runs across the areas of Pruzhany, Bereza Kartuska, Vyhoniv Lake, Lyusina, Turaw, reaching the Pripyat river and following it to the Dnieper. Areas around Loyew and Chavusy have also been historically included in the area.

According to the 1897 Russian census, speakers of Ukrainian ("Little Russian") language comprised a significant part of the population in southern parts of Grodno and Minsk governorates, and formed the absolute majority of population in Brest and Kobryn uezds. Following the Russian Revolution of 1905, a Ukrainian theatre was established in Brest. During World War I, a Ukrainian newspaper was published in the city, and a Prosvita society was established. Another major centre of the Ukrainian community in the region was the town of Dzivin (Dyvyn). Following the Treaty of Brest, the area of Beresteishchyna became part of the Ukrainian People's Republic, and later the Ukrainian State, which contributed to further development of Ukrainian press and schooling. However, following the Polish occupation in 1919, the Treaty of Riga proclaimed the region part of Second Polish Republic. Despite attempts of Polonization promoted by Polish authorities, local activists continued to support Ukrainian culture and communal life. As a result, the government imprisoned many of them in the Bereza Kartuska Prison and in 1935 the activities of Prosvita in Polesie Voivodeship were outlawed. In advance to the Second World War, illegal branches of the Organization of Ukrainian Nationalists and other Ukrainian paramilitary organizations were established in the area.

Following the Soviet annexation of the region in 1939, Ukrainians of Beresteishchyna supported the region's attachment to Ukrainian SSR. However, according to a personal decision of Joseph Stalin, the area was incorporated into Soviet Belarus. As a result, local inhabitants were officially classified as Belarusians, Ukrainian schools were closed, and activists of the Ukrainian movement suffered persecution. After the beginning of German-Soviet War, the region was occupied by Nazi Germany and transferred to Reichskommissariat Ukraine. During that period, Ukrainian press and schools resumed their activities. In 1942 Ukrainian Autocephalous Orthodox Church was officially restored at a synod in Pinsk. In October 1942 a sotnia of the Ukrainian Insurgent Army (UPA) was formed in the area of Dyvyn by Serhiy Kachynskyi (nom de guerre Ostap). UPA remained active in the region until the early 1950s, with the last battle between its units and the KGB taking place in March 1952 in Ivanava district. Next year, a squad of Ukrainian insurgents was neutralized near Kobryn.

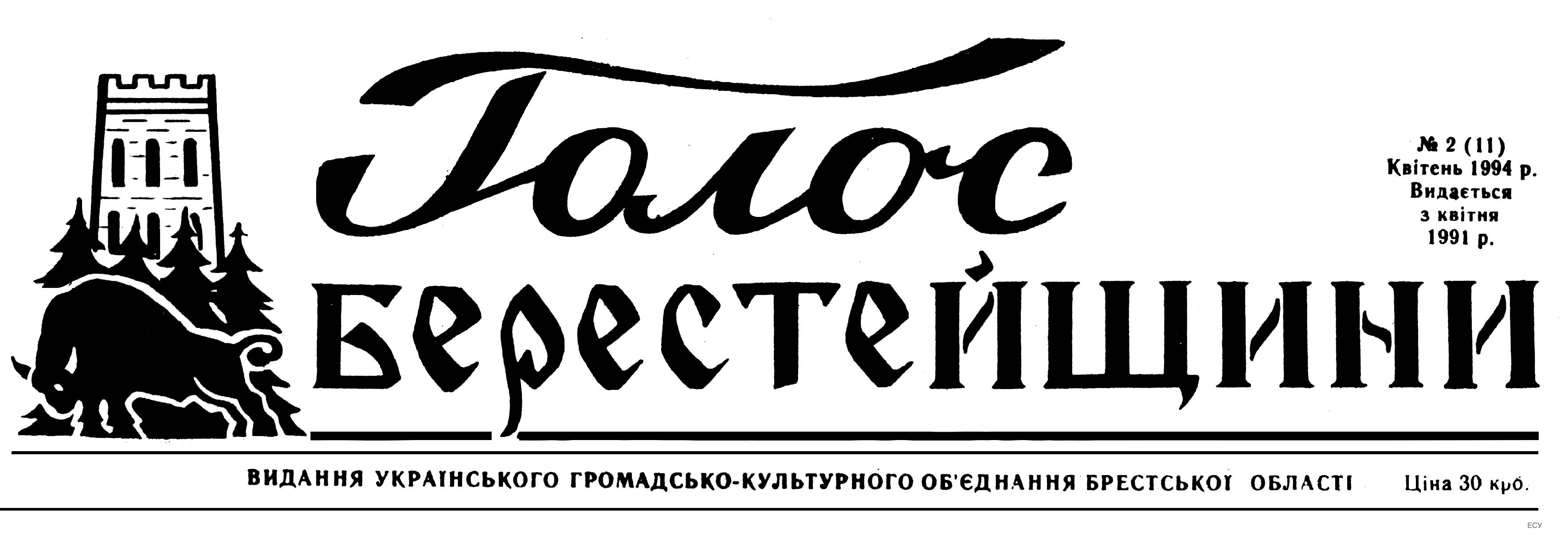
Logo of the Voice of Beresteyshchyna newspaper, published by the Ukrainian community of Belarus during the 1990s

Following the end of WW2, Soviet authorities in Beresteishchyna continued to persecute Ukrainian activists and introduced policies of formal Belarusification, which in reality resulted in Russification of the region. Despite this, many locals continued using Ukrainian in daily life. The situation changed during the final years before the dissolution of the Soviet Union. In 1990 a Ukrainian community organization was established in Brest, and in 1991 a Ukrainian newspaper was launched. In 1994 a branch of Prosvita was founded in the region, and starting from 1996 Ukrainian studies and history of Ukraine were included in the curriculum of Brest University. Ukrainian language and literature also became subjects of choice in some schools in the area. In 2002 a monument to Taras Shevchenko was installed in Brest. However, following the establishment of Alexander Lukashenko's authoritarian regime in Belarus, authorities started a campaign of pressure against Ukrainian organizations in the country. In 1999 the Ukrainian community organization of Brest Oblast and the local Prosvita were denied registration by state officials. During the same time, Ukrainian publications were closed down, and teaching of Ukrainian language and literature in schools ceased. In 2008 the department of Ukrainian studies at Brest University was disbanded.

Following the 2022 Russian invasion of Ukraine, numerous Ukrainians residing in Belarus have become victims of persecution by the country's authorities on accusation of "extremist activities" and "cooperation with Ukrainian secret services". Among those arrested were refugees fleeing the Russian invasion. Some of detained Ukrainians were subjected to torture. Over 40 prisoners were eventually liberated and delivered to Ukrainian authorities, but many still remain incarcerated in Belarus, with their whereabouts being unknown.

== Demographics ==
=== Population ===
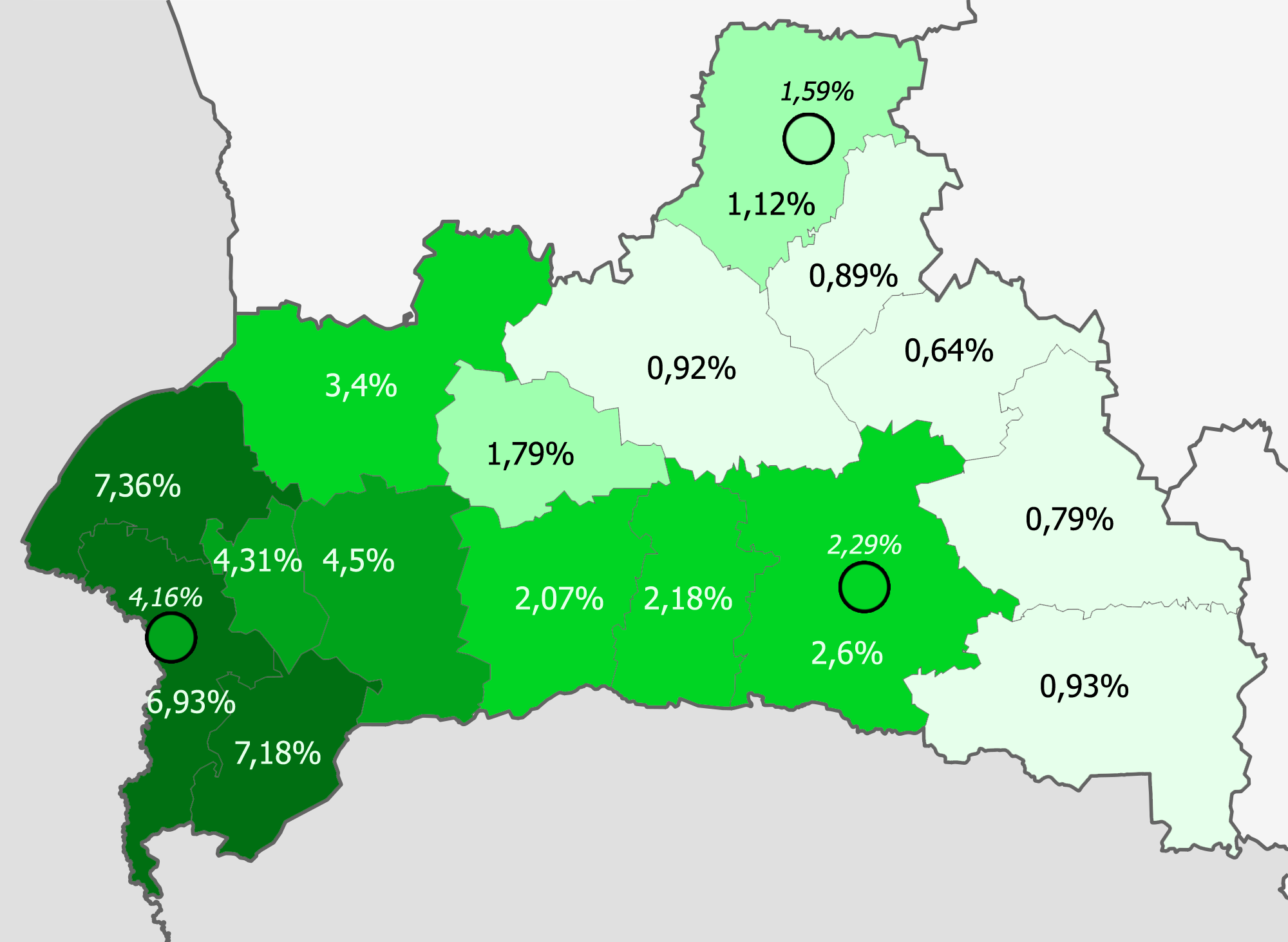
Population of Ukrainians by district in Brest Region, 2009 census

Historically, Ukrainians made up a large population of the Belarusian population; in the 1897 census, there were 362,800 Ukrainians in Grodno Governorate, making up 22.9% of the total population of the time. In Kobrinsky and Brestsky Uyezds, Ukrainians made up the majority of the population, at 79.6% and 64.4% of the population, respectively.

In 2009, Ukrainians made up 1.7% of the total population of Belarus, with 158,723 people. The population is primarily located in southern Belarus, and concentrated particularly in Brest Region, but substantial populations exist in all regions of the country. The region with the lowest Ukrainian population is Vitebsk Region, where Ukrainians make up 1.18% of the population.

Region	Ukrainian population	Percentage
Brest	40,046	2.86%
Gomel	30,920	2.15%
Grodno	14,983	1.40%
Minsk	17,745	1.25%
Minsk (city)	27,362	1.49%
Mogilev	13,110	1.19%
Vitebsk	14,557	1.18%
Total	158,723	1.67%

=== Language ===
Per the 2009 census, many Ukrainians in Belarus have continued to use the Ukrainian language, unlike many other groups such as Lipka Tatars - 29.2% of the total Ukrainian Belarusian population uses it. However, at the same time, a trend of russification has developed among the Ukrainian population; 61.2% of all Ukrainians use the Russian language. By comparison, very few have been inclined to speak the Belarusian language, with only 7.9% of the total Ukrainian population speaking it.

Region	Belarusian	Russian	Ukrainian	Other/no information
Brest	7.9%	51.5%	39.3%	1.3%
Gomel	9.1%	62.5%	26.7%	1.7%
Grodno	11.2%	64.0%	23.4%	1.4%
Minsk	8.8%	60.8%	28.7%	1.7%
Minsk (city)	5.4%	67.9%	23.8%	2.9%
Mogilev	7.5%	65.0%	26.2%	1.3%
Vitebsk	5.8%	66.7%	26.5%	1.0%
Total	7.9%	61.2%	29.2%	1.7%

== Notable people ==
- Theodore Odrach, writer
- Svetlana Alexievich, author and pro-democracy activist
- Natalka Babina, writer
- Jury Chaščavacki, pro-democracy activist
- Vassili Nesterenko, physicist
- Aleksandr Potupa, philosopher and pro-democracy activist
- Lidia Yermoshina, chairwoman of the Central Election Commission of Belarus
- Yuri Zisser, programmer and pro-democracy activist, founder of Tut.By

== See also ==
- Belarus–Ukraine relations
- Ethnic groups in Belarus
- Ukrainian diaspora
- Belarusians in Ukraine
