= History of Podlaskie Voivodeship =

This is a sub-article to Podlaskie Voivodeship

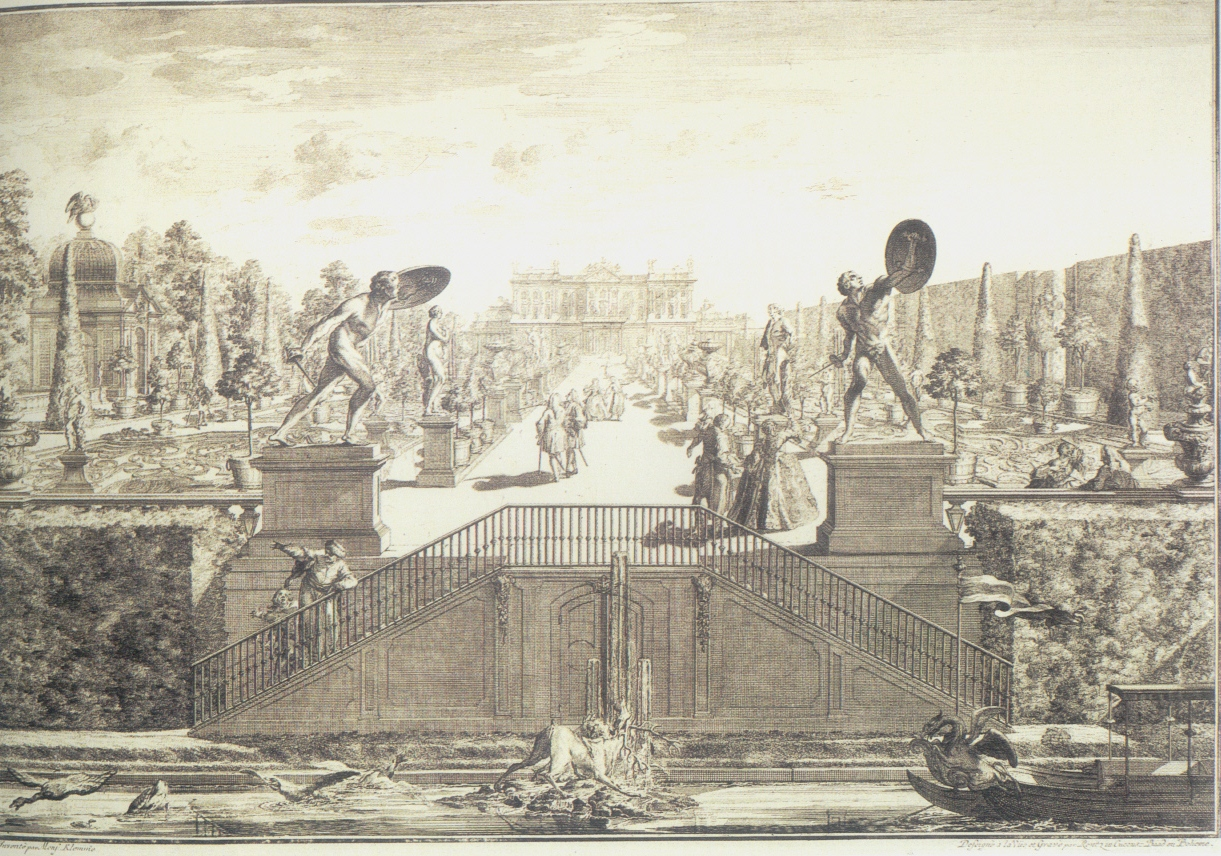
Branicki Palace and garden in Białystok in the 18th century

Throughout its early history, the area comprising the current day Podlaskie Voivodeship was inhabited by various tribes of different ethnic roots. In the 9th and 10th centuries, the area was likely inhabited by Lechitic tribes in the west and south, Baltic (Yotvingian) tribes in the north, and East Slavic tribes in the east. Between the 10th and 13th centuries, the area was mostly divided between Poland, Ruthenian principalities and the Yotvingians, and by the 14th century, it was divided between the Kingdom of Poland and the Grand Duchy of Lithuania. In 1569, after the Union of Lublin, most of the current voivodeship was reintegranted with the Kingdom of Poland.

== Historical periods ==
The following is a partial list of political subdivisions in which part or all of current day Podlaskie Voivodeship was wholly or partially contained within:

| Years | Historical Political Unit | Area of present Voivodeship |
| Years | Historical Political Unit | East/South; Areas | West; Areas | North; Areas |
| 1998; 1989 | Third Polish Republic | Białystok Voivodeship | Łomża Voivodeship | Suwałki Voivodeship |
| 1989; 1975 | People's Republic of Poland | Białystok Voivodeship | Łomża Voivodeship | Suwałki Voivodeship |
| 1975; 1952 | People's Republic of Poland | Białystok Voivodeship |
| 1952; 1945 | Republic of Poland | Białystok Voivodeship |
| 1945; 1944 | Belarusian Soviet Socialist Republic | Belastok Region |
| 1945; 1944 | Republic of Poland | | | Provisional Committees |
| 1944; 1941 | Nazi Germany | Bezirk Bialystok | | East Prussia |
| 1941; 1939 | Belarusian Soviet Socialist Republic | Belastok Region |
| 1941; 1939 | Nazi Germany | | | East Prussia |
| 1939; 1938 | Second Polish Republic | Białystok Voivodeship | Warsaw Voivodeship | Białystok Voivodeship |
| 1938; 1918 | Second Polish Republic | Białystok Voivodeship |
| 1918; 1915 | German Empire | Bialystok-Grodno District | | Lithuania District |
| 1918; 1915 | Kingdom of Poland | | TBD |

Russian Empire

- Grodno Governorate (1842–1915)
- Belostok Oblast (1807–1842)

Kingdom of Poland (Congress Poland)

Duchy of Warsaw (1807–1815)

Kingdom of Prussia

- Białystok Department (1795–1807)

Polish-Lithuanian Commonwealth

- Podlaskie Voivodeship (1569–1795)
- Masovian Voivodeship

Grand Duchy of Lithuania

- Podlaskie Voivodeship (1513–1569)
- Trakai Voivodeship
- Duchy of Trakai
- Duchy of Lithuania

Kingdom of Poland

- Duchy of Masovia

Kingdom of Galicia–Volhynia

- Galicia–Volhynia (Land of Berestia)

Kievan Rus

- Kievan Rus
- Yotvingia

Duchy of Poland

== History ==
In Krynki and Mielnik, renewals of the Polish–Lithuanian union were concluded in 1434 and 1501, respectively. In the second half of the 15th century, the Drohiczyn Land was divided into three smaller administrative and territorial units: the Drohiczyn Land, the Bielsk Land and the Mielnik Land. The formal creation of the Podlaskie Voivodeship took place on August 29, 1513, when Ivan Sapieha, who held the office of governor and later the Vitebsk governor was appointed the Voivode of Podlasie even before he was formally called to live in that voivodeship. Ivan Sapieha died in 1517 and for three years the voivodship did not have a voivode. In 1519 to this office was appointed to Albertas Goštautas, who possessed extensive Tykocin estates and he was the voivode of Troki.

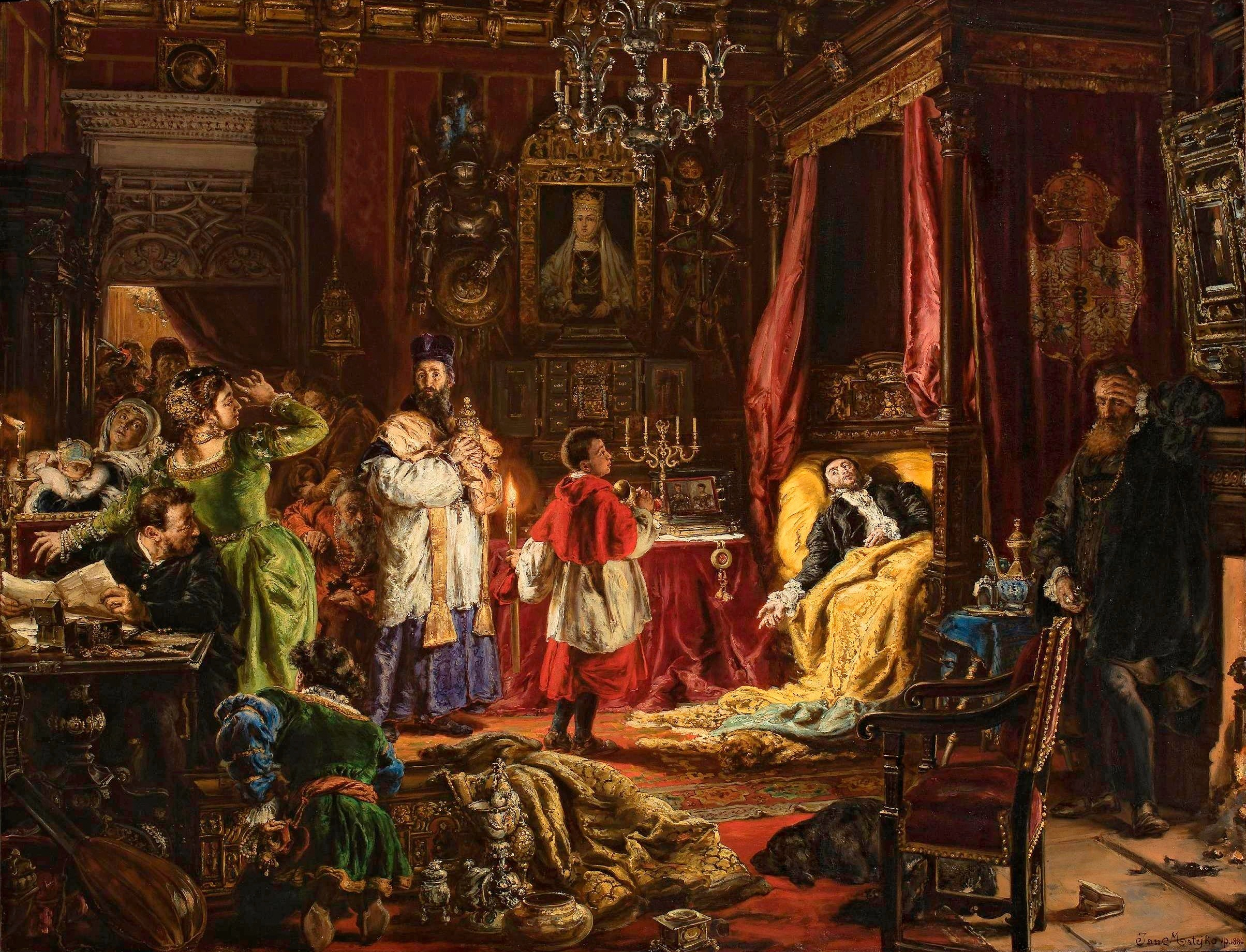
Death of King Sigismund Augustus at Knyszyn, 19th-century painting by Jan Matejko

In 1520, Sigismund I the Old, who was in Toruń, appointed Janusz Kostewicz for the position of the Podlaskie voivode. In 1566, the area of the Podlasie Voivodship was reduced by the Brest, Kamnica and Kobryn lands, which, together with the Turow-Pińsk principality, formed the Brześć Litewski Voivodeship. Three years later, in 1569, the reduced Podlasie Province was incorporated into the Crown by the order of Sigismund II Augustus and the resolution of the Sejm of the Polish–Lithuanian Commonwealth. At his favorite residence in Knyszyn, King Sigismund II Augustus died in 1562, ending the reign of the Jagiellonian dynasty in Poland. Tykocin, whose Old Town is designated a Historic Monument of Poland, was an important residential town of Polish kings in the region and the place where the Order of the White Eagle, Poland's oldest and highest order, was established.

After the Third Partition of Poland in 1795, Białystok Region came under Prussian rule. In the occupied areas, the Prussians formed the Organization Camera of the War and Domain Camera, which was located in Białystok. The area of operation of the Camera Organizational Committee in Bialystok included 4 compartments: Wierzbołowski, Pułtusk, Białystok and Łomża. Circuses were divided into smaller organizational units, i.e. districts. They were established in Białystok, Bielsk Podlaski, Dąbrowa, Goniądz, Sokółka, Tykocin, Ciechanowiec, Drohiczyn, Ostrołęka, Wąsosz, Zambrów, Wizna, Ciechanów, Maków, Nasielsk, Płońsk, Przasnysz, Wyszków, Hołynka, Kalwaria, Mariampach, Wampachki. The lowest level of the territorial division was made up of village clusters with head leaders, nobility clusters with caretakers and cities with mayors. The works of the Commission ended in 1797 and the Camera of War and Domains of the Białystok Department was created. The Bialystok Department embraced 10 landrat districts. Their headquarters were: Łomża, Goniądz, Drohiczyn, Suraż, Bielsk, Białystok, Dąbrowa, Wigry, Kalwaria, and Mariampol.

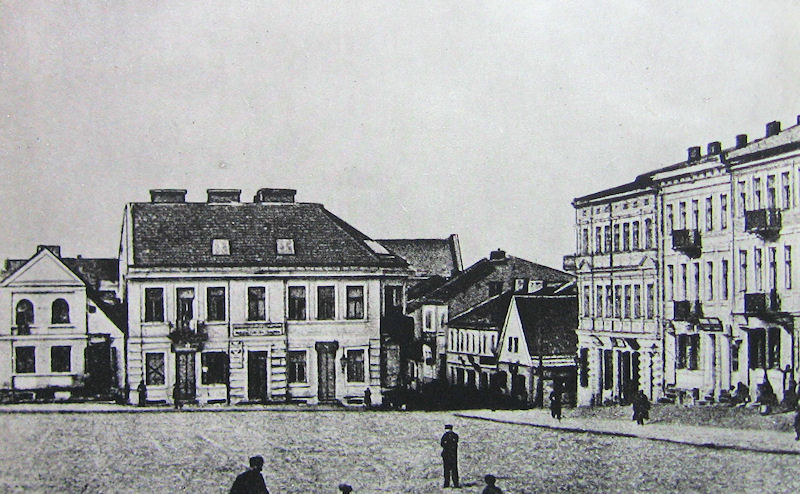
Łomża in 1912

Napoleon gave the counties of Białystok, Drohiczyn, Bielsk and Sokółka, with parts of the Suraż, Biebrza and Dąbrowa counties, to Tsar Aleksander I on 7 July 1807. A year later the Russian authorities created a separate administrative unit from this territory - the Belostok Oblast, consisting of from four counties: Białystok, Bielsk, Sokółka and Drohiczyn, whereas the western and northern parts of the area with Łomża, Suwałki and Tykocin passed to the short-lived Polish Duchy of Warsaw. After the failed November and January uprisings, Russification policies and anti-Polish repressions intensified, including deportations to katorga. Białystok grew into a significant center of the textile industry, the largest after Łódź in then-partitioned Poland. Białystok was the largest industrial center between Warsaw and Łódź in the west, Saint Petersburg in the north and Moscow in the east, and was nicknamed "Manchester of the North". During World War I, the territory was occupied by Germany, and after the war it was part of reborn independent Poland. In 1920, it was invaded by Soviet Russia, but Poland repulsed the Soviets and secured its freedom.

Following the joint German-Soviet invasion of Poland, which started World War II in September 1939, the territory was occupied mostly by the Soviet Union with a small northern part with Suwałki occupied by Germany until 1941, and then it was entirely occupied by Germany until 1944. The Germans and Soviet occupiers conducted genocidal crimes against the local population, including mass arrests, deportations to forced labour, and executions and massacres of civilians and prisoners of war. Despite such circumstances, the Polish resistance was organized and active in the region. Afterwards, it was restored to Poland, although with a Soviet-installed communist regime, which stayed in power until the 1980s. The Soviet NKVD and SMERSH continued the persecution of the Polish resistance in the following months, with deportations to the USSR and executions, including the Augustów roundup.
