= Smolensky gusaczok =

Russian folk dance

"Смоленский гусачок"

Song
- Language: Russian
- English title: "The Smolyanin Gosling"
- Written: 18th century
- Genre: Folk
- Songwriter: Traditional

Smolensky gusaczok is an archaic Russian folk dance, khorovod. The largest number of versions were recorded in most of the Smolensk Governorate, as well as in parts of the Mogilev Governorate (in the Gomelsky and Brestsky uezds.

Participants imitate the gait, flight and habits of geese following the leader: a leisurely step, from side to side, winding lines, spirals in the drawing. The leaders depict a gander and a goose, competing in a dance. Most often accompanied by chastushkas.

== History ==
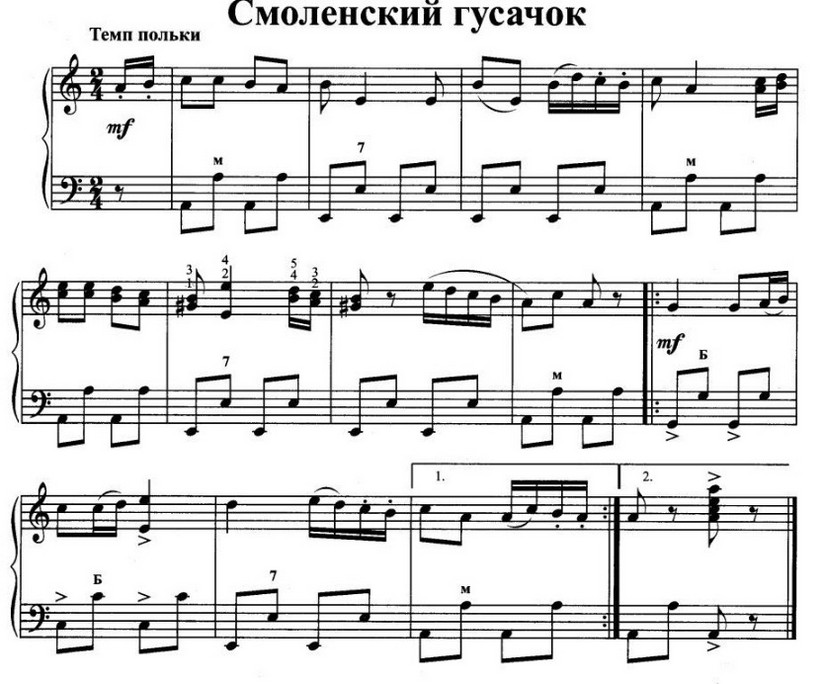
Notes of Smolensky gusaczok by Ustinova

The melody was known in the mid-18th century. It was recorded among Russian soldiers in the Vyborg Governorate during the War of the Hats. From Vyborg, this melody was picked up by the local population and, having remade it in their own style, gave the world their own Ievan polkka.

The final and most widespread version of Smolensky gusaczok was recorded by Tatyana Alekseevna Ustinova. This sthenic version was included in the repertoire of the Pyatnitsky Russian Folk Chorus for a long time.
