= Grodno Province =

Grodno Province may refer to several places:

- Grodno Region, an administrative division of Belarus and Byelorussian SSR
- Grodno Governorate, an administrative division of the Russian Empire
