= Nikolai Streletsky =

Soviet scientist-mechanic

- Николай Станиславович Стрелецкий
- Born: 2 September 1885; Osowiec Fortress, Belostoksky Uyezd, Congress Poland
- Died: 15 February 1967 (aged 81); Moscow
- Resting place: Novodevichy Cemetery
- Education: Vladivostok Gymnasium
- Alma mater: Institute of Road Engineers
- Known for: Theory of strength of structures and constructions
- Awards: Hero of Socialist Labour, Order of Lenin, Order of the Red Banner of Labour
- Scientific career
- Fields: Structural mechanics, bridge construction
- Workplaces: Bauman Moscow State Technical University, Kucherenko Central Research Institute of Structures Construction

Nikolai Stanislavovich Streletsky (Russian: Николай Станиславович Стрелецкий; September 2, 1885, Kingdom of Poland – February 15, 1967, Moscow) was a Soviet scientist-mechanic, specialist in the field of building structures and bridge construction; Corresponding Member of the Soviet Academy of Sciences (1931). His main works were on the theory of strength of structures and constructions. Of great importance for the practice of design and construction are the theoretical foundations of calculating building structures for limit states, developed under his supervision. He also developed the principles of typification of transport and industrial structures. A number of large metal railway bridges were built according to his designs.

== Biography ==
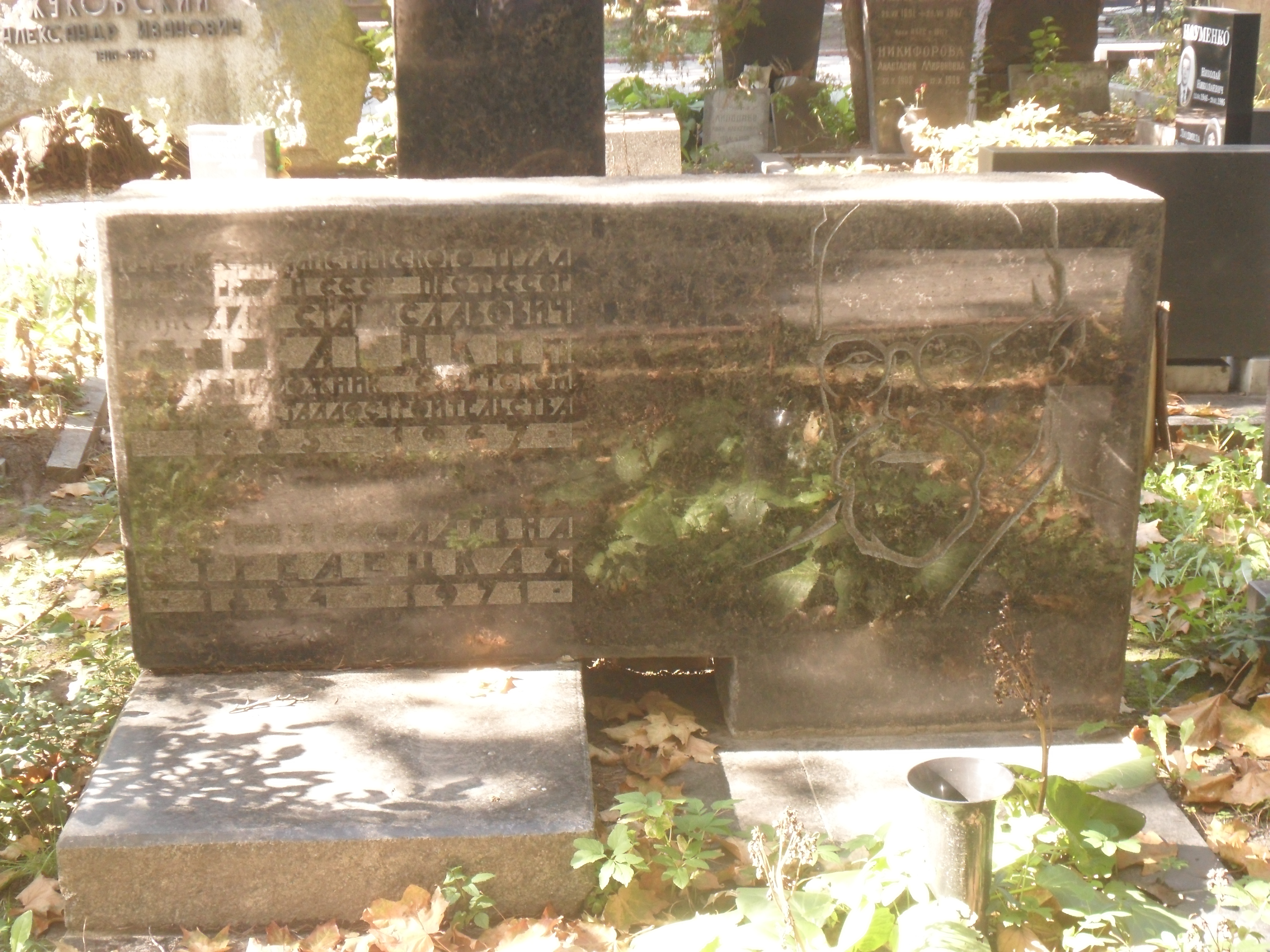
Streletsky's grave at Novodevichy Cemetery

Born September 2 (14), 1885 in the Osowiec Fortress of the Belostoksky Uyezd of the Kingdom of Poland. His father, military engineer Stanislav Streletsky, built defensive structures in Vilnius, Riga, Khabarovsk and Vladivostok.

In 1904, Nikolai Streletsky graduated from high school in Vladivostok and entered the St. Petersburg Institute of Railway Engineers, where he graduated with honors in 1911. To improve his knowledge of bridge construction, he was sent on a two-year business trip to Germany, where he attended lectures at the Charlottenburg Higher Technical School, worked in a design bureau, and participated in the construction of bridges.

After returning from abroad, Streletsky began working at the Moscow–Kazan Railway Society, where, under his leadership, projects were developed for bridges across the Oka River and a tunnel under the Volga in Nizhny Novgorod.

In 1915, Streletsky became a teacher at the Faculty of Civil Engineering at Moscow Higher Technical School; In 1917, he headed the bridge department and simultaneously began teaching at the Moscow Institute of Railway Engineers. In 1918, he received the title of professor.

In 1927, on his initiative, a test was conducted on a 33.2 m long railway span structure made of shipbuilding steel, manufactured in 1909, which was not allowed by the Ministry of Railways to be installed on a bridge and had been stored at the Kolomensky Plant all these years. Experimental static and dynamic studies under load showed its satisfactory qualities. Then followed projects developed under Streletsky's supervision for railway bridges across the Tsipa River on the Transcaucasus Railway, across the Noni and Sungari Rivers on the Chinese Eastern Railway (1927), as well as arched bridges across the New and Old Dnieper in Zaporizhzhia during the construction of the Dnieper Hydroelectric Station. The latter had a span of 224 m, the largest in Europe at that time. These bridges confirmed the advantages of span structures made of low-alloy steels of high quality.

In 1930–1935, he headed the bridge department at the Military Engineering Academy. He combined his teaching work with extensive research and engineering activities.

In addition to bridge construction, Streletsky was interested in metal structures of industrial and civil construction. In 1927, he became one of the organizers of the State Institute of Construction, which was transformed five years later into TsNIIPS, where he first headed the laboratory, and in 1935–1936 he was the director.

Streletsky created the "triangle of metal construction development" that later became widely known, which included Proektstalkonstruktsiya, the metal structures department of TsNIIPS and the corresponding department of the Kuybyshev Moscow Institute of Civil Engineering. For thirty years, he carried out the interaction between these three organizations. Under his leadership, regional creative centers for the development of metal structures were created in Novosibirsk, Leningrad, Makeyevka, Novokuznetsk, Gorky, Voronezh and others. From 1932, he headed the Department of Metal Structures at MISI, where he studied in depth the issues of their calculation, including taking into account the development of plastic deformations.

In 1931, Streletsky was awarded the title of Corresponding Member of the Soviet Academy of Sciences.

He died on February 15, 1967, and was buried at the Novodevichy Cemetery in Moscow.
