= Pruzhansky Uyezd =

Subdivision of the Grodno Governorate

Pruzhansky Uyezd (Russian: Пружанский уезд) was one of the subdivisions of the Grodno Governorate of the Russian Empire. It was situated in the central part of the governorate. Its administrative centre was Pruzhany.

== Demographics ==
At the time of the Russian Empire Census of 1897, Pruzhansky Uyezd had a population of 139,074. Of these, 75.5% spoke Belarusian, 12.8% Yiddish, 6.7% Ukrainian, 3.0% Russian, 1.4% Polish, 0.3% German and 0.1% Tatar as their native language.
