= Scientific Research Center "Stroitelstvo" =

Russian research institute

- Formation: April 2, 1927; 99 years ago
- Type: Governmental organization
- Headquarters: Moscow Oblast, Russia
- Parent organization: Government of Russia
- Website: www.cstroy.ru

Scientific Research Center "Stroitelstvo" (Russian: АО «НИЦ «Строительство») is a research institute in Russia active in the field of construction.

== History ==
The organization began as the State Scientific and Experimental Institute of Civil, Engineering and Industrial Structures established in accordance with a decree of the Presidium of the Supreme Soviet of the National Economy of the Soviet Union issued on 2 April 1927. with one of its founders was Nikolai Streletsky. In 1931 the institute was renamed the Central Scientific Research Institute of Industrial Constructions (TsNIIPS).

In accordance with a resolution issued by the Government of Russia, since 1994 the current organization includes three institutes:

- Kucherenko Central Research Institute of Structures Construction (Russian: Центральный научно-исследовательский институт строительных конструкций имени В. А. Кучеренко;
- Gvozdev Research Institute of Concrete and Reinforced Concrete;
- Gersevanov Research, Design and Survey, Design
- Technological Institute of Foundations and Underground Structures

In 2009 the company was transformed from unitary enterprise into an open Joint-Stock company, as a result of which 100% of the voting shares belong to the Government of Russia represented by the Federal Agency for State Property Management with its subordinated institutes lost their legal status and all their rights and obligations were transferred to JSC Scientific Research Center "Stroitelstvo".

In 2014 Scientific-Research Center "Stroitelstvo", became one of the coordinators of the technological platform "Construction and Architecture", approved by the decision of the Presidium of the Council under the President of the Russian Federation for the Modernization of the Economy and Innovative Development of Russia. The Kucherenko Institute is directed by Ivan Vedyakov.
