= Stanisław Plater =

- Born: 10 May 1784; Senasis Daugėliškis, Grand Duchy of Lithuania, Polish–Lithuanian Commonwealth
- Died: 8 May 1851 (aged 66); Wolsztyn, Province of Posen, Kingdom of Prussia
- Parents: Kazimierz Konstanty Plater (father); Izabela née Borch (mother)
- Scientific career
- Fields: Historian, Geographer, Statistician, Encyclopedist

Stanisław Plater (Lithuanian: Stanislovas Pliateris; 10 May 1784 – 8 May 1851) was a Polish–Lithuanian historian, geographer, statistician and encyclopedist. He is considered an early pioneer of Polish statistical and geographic scholarship.

== Biography ==
Stanisław Plater was born on 10 May 1784 in Senasis Daugėliškis, then within the Vilnius Voivodeship of the Grand Duchy of Lithuania within the Polish–Lithuanian Commonwealth. He was a member of the noble Plater family (of the Plater coat of arms). His father, Kazimierz Konstanty Plater, served as the last Lithuanian vice-chancellor, and his mother, Izabela née Borch, was a writer and editor of the children’s magazine Przyjaciel Dzieci (1789–1792) in Warsaw, considered the first of its kind in Poland.

He studied at the Vilnius Main School, one of the leading academic centers of the late Commonwealth period.

Between 1806 and 1815, Plater served as an officer in the army of the Duchy of Warsaw, participating in Napoleon's Russian campaign, and rose to the rank of lieutenant. After the fall of the Duchy, he briefly served as a captain in the army of Congress Poland in 1815 before leaving military service.

He then settled in Greater Poland, where he married Antonina Gajewska (1790–1866) and lived in Wroniawy, her family estate brought as a dowry. Later, he resided in Poznań and spent time in Paris, maintaining connections with Polish émigré intellectuals.

Plater authored works on geography, military history, and statistics in both Polish and French. His most notable publication was the Atlas statystyczny Królestwa Polskiego i krajów ościennych (Statistical Atlas of Poland and Neighboring Countries, 1827), one of the first statistical atlases in Central Europe. He also authored the two-volume Mała Encyklopedia Polska ("Little Polish Encyclopedia").

For his military service, Plater received the Virtuti Militari (Military Order of the Duchy of Warsaw) and later the Order of the Red Eagle of the Kingdom of Prussia.

Plater died on 8 May 1851 in Wolsztyn, Province of Posen (Kingdom of Prussia), and was buried in the local parish church.

== Legacy ==
Plater's publications contributed to the development of Polish geography and statistics in the early 19th century. His Atlas statystyczny and Mała Encyklopedia Polska were among the first systematic efforts to organize and present knowledge about Poland and surrounding regions. Later Polish scholars, including Zygmunt Gloger and Bolesław Olszewicz, cited his work as foundational for national cartography and encyclopedic science. His combination of historical and statistical approaches anticipated methods used by later 19th-century Polish geographers.
