= Senasis Daugėliškis =

Lithuanian settlement

Coordinates: 55°20′28″N 26°16′38″E

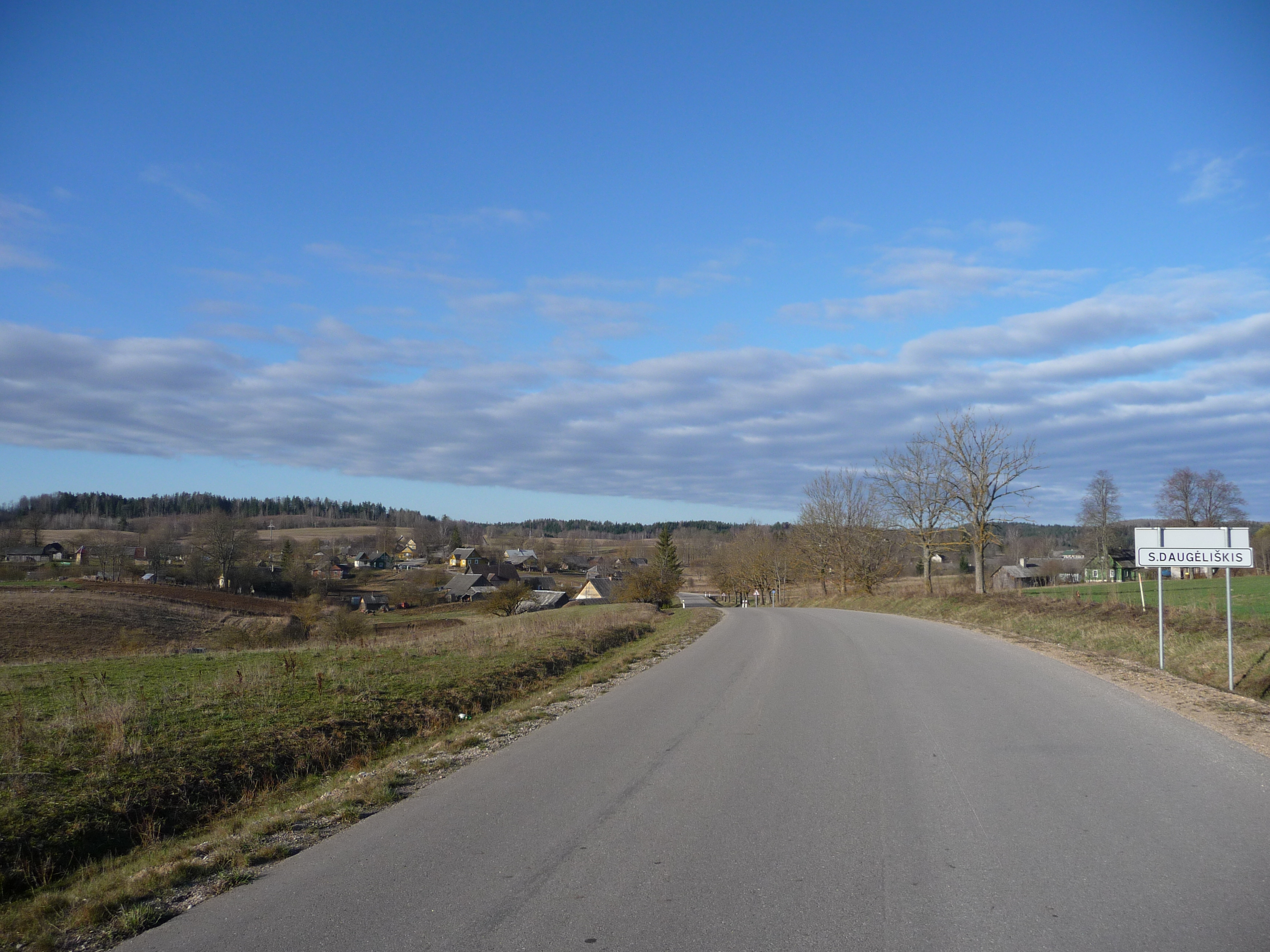
Senasis_Daugeliskis

Senasis Daugėliškis (Note: Old Daugėliškis, Polish name: Stare Daugieliszki, Russian: Даугелишки, Давгелишки, Дoвгелишки, romanized: Daugelishki, Davgelishki, Dovgelishki) is a street village in Ignalina District Municipality, Utena County, Lithuania.

In the past it was known simply Daugėliškis, without distinguishing it from Naujasis Daugėliškis ("New Daugėliškis") established in the 19th century nearby.

The place name is derived from the personal name Daugėla/Daugėlas.
