= Belsky Uyezd (Grodno Governorate) =

Subdivision of the Grodno Governorate of the Russian Empire

Belsky Uyezd (Russian: Бельский уезд) was one of the subdivisions of the Grodno Governorate of the Russian Empire. It was situated in the western part of the governorate. Its administrative centre was Bielsk Podlaski.

== Demographics ==
At the time of the Russian Empire Census of 1897, Belsky Uyezd had a population of 164,441. Of these, 39.1% spoke Ukrainian, 34.9% Polish, 14.9% Yiddish, 5.9% Russian, 4.9% Belarusian and 0.2% German as their native language.
