= Sokolsky Uyezd =

Sokolsky Uyezd (Russian: Сокольский уезд) was one of the nine subdivisions of the Grodno Governorate of the Russian Empire. It was situated in the northwestern part of the governorate. Its administrative centre was Sokółka.

== Demographics ==
At the time of the Russian Empire Census of 1897, Sokolsky Uyezd had a population of 110,545. Of these, 83.8% spoke Belarusian, 12.2% Yiddish, 1.8% Russian, 1.2% Polish, 0.4% Ukrainian, 0.3% Chuvash, 0.1% German and 0.1% Lithuanian as their native language.
