= Theodore Odrach =

Ukrainian writer

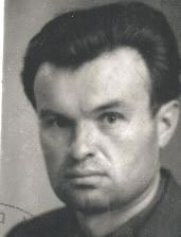
- Theodore Odrach (undated photo)
- Born: Theodore Sholomitsky; March 13, 1912; Misiatichy, Russian Empire
- Died: October 7, 1964 (aged 52); Toronto, Canada
- Other name: The Songbird of the Pinsk Marshes
- Education: Stefan Batory University (now Vilnius University)
- Occupation: Author
- Spouse: Klara Nagorski
- Children: Ruta and Erma Odrach
- Writing career
- Pen name: Theodore Odrach
- Language: Ukrainian/English
- Years active: 1955-1964
- Period: Stalinist era
- Genre: Soviet history
- Subject: Surviving under tyranny
- Notable works: Wave of Terror (2008); The Village Teacher and Other Stories (2022)

Theodore Odrach (March 13, 1912 – October 7, 1964), born Theodore Sholomitsky, was a Ukrainian-Belarusian writer of novels, short stories and memoirs. He is generally known as the "songbird of the Pinsk Marshes." The Pinsk Marshes are mostly in southern Belarus. It is one of the largest wetlands in Europe, half the size of Germany. Odrach's love of the Marsh is depicted in much of his writing.

== Odrach's writing ==
Odrach captures life during World War Two in a deceptively simple style. His writing moves quickly and is memorable and realistic. Much of it is based on eyewitness accounts. “Odrach has a very precise style. He’s not interested in expanding the event. He has almost a journalistic eye for the story he wants to tell.”

“Odrach’s prose is deft and beautifully structured. Through masterful uses of humor and irony, as well as myth and the supernatural, Odrach guides us through his extraordinary narratives. He is a genuine storyteller. Through compelling incidents and with piercing insight, he gets us inside his stories and makes us a party to the many layered struggles of a world he knows only too well. This is a writer who is clearly focused and obviously in touch with his characters, landscapes, and events. The prose style is spare, controlled, and polished.” ~ Richard Lush, Toronto

“Odrach’s most obvious literary debts are to Anton Chekhov and Isaac Babel. He uses irony and humor in similar ways as he captures the internal drama of his characters with psychological concision.” ~ T. F. Rigelhof, Montréal

“[Wave of Terror] serves as a stern warning against adopting socialism in America.” ~ J. Conrad Guest

== Early life ==
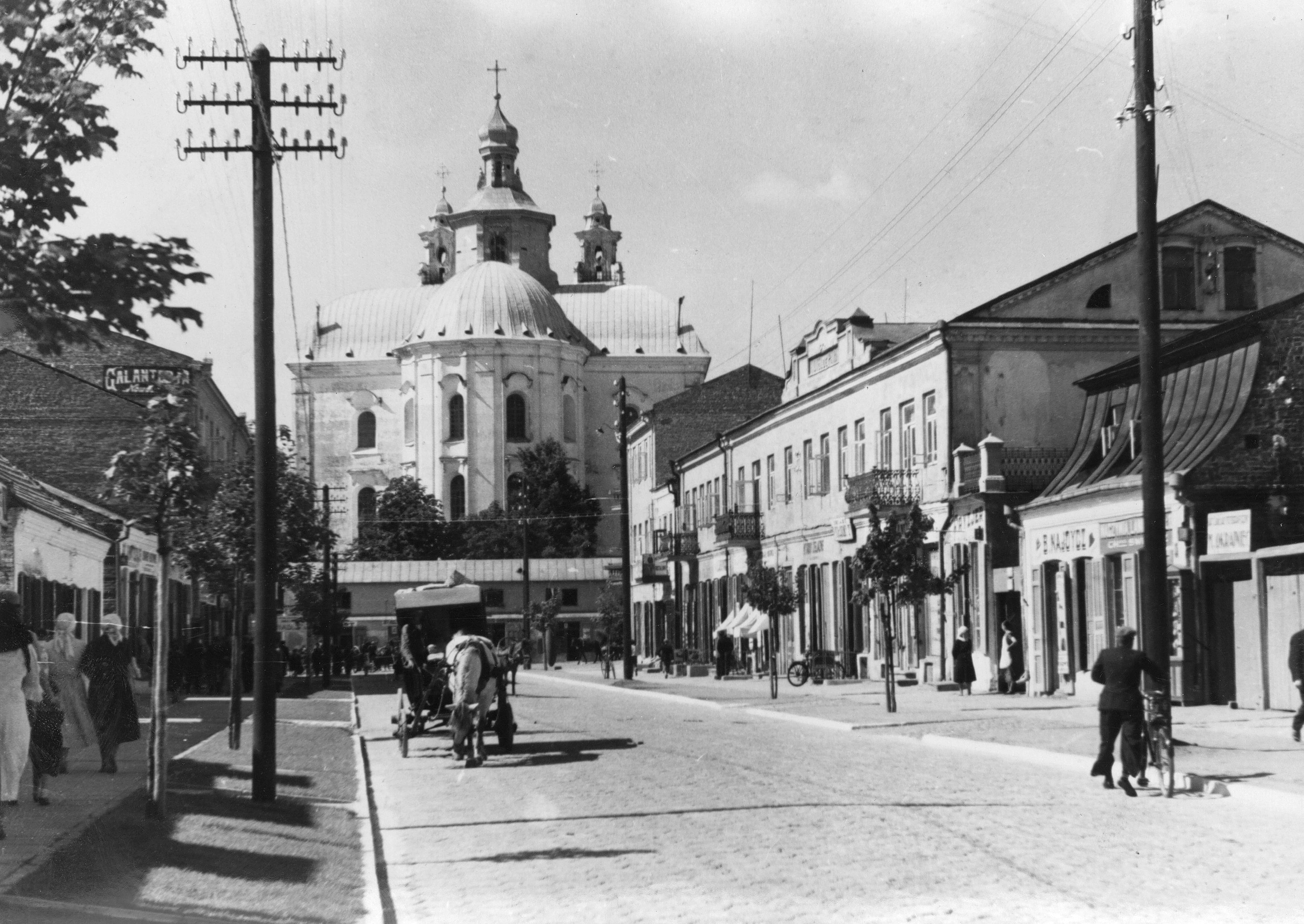
Pinsk in 1930

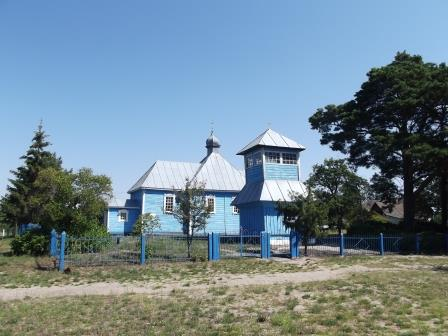
The Church in Misiatichy.

Odrach was born in the village Misiatichy, outside of Pinsk, Belarus (then part of the Russian Empire), to an impoverished noble family ("shliahta"). His parents were Demian and Olha Sholomitsky, of Ukrainian and Belarusian background. The youngest of seven children, Odrach was extremely devoted to his mother. An unruly child, at the age of nine, he was sent by Polish authorities, who then controlled the area, to a reform school for boys in Vilnius. His parents were never informed of his whereabouts and did not learn what had happened to him until years later. After serving his time, doing odd renovation jobs around town, at the age of eighteen, Odrach enrolled in the Stefan Batory University (now Vilnius University), where he went on to earn a degree in ancient history and philosophy.

The family coat of arms depicts Hippocentaurus, and the family name dates back to the 16th century, when the Grand Duchy of Lithuania was powerful. The Sholomitsky estate was located in the village of Sholomichy, near Pinsk.

The Church of Saint Paraskeva in Misiatichy, which was founded in the 18th century, figures prominently in Odrach's short story "The Icon". The Polissian local word "odrach" means "meadows near the Styr river at Misiatichy".

== World War II ==
With the Soviet invasion of Vilnius in 1939, Odrach fled to his native Belarus, landing a position as headmaster of a grammar school in the village of Soshna (near Pinsk). Denounced by the Soviets and briefly imprisoned, he then headed south to Ukraine (Volyn Oblast), where he edited several underground newspapers. Still pursued by the Soviets and ultimately forced into hiding, he changed his name from Sholomitsky to Odrach and managed to escape to Slovakia by way of the Carpathian Mountains.

== Personal life ==
With the war's end, Odrach traveled around Europe for several years. In 1948, after meeting Klara Nagorski in Germany, the two moved to Manchester, England, where they married. They lived in Manchester for approximately five years and worked as weavers in a linen factory. In 1953, both Odrach and his wife boarded an ocean liner and sailed for Canada. With the birth of their two daughters, Ruta and Erma (who later translated his work into English), they settled into a Victorian-style house on a small, quiet residential street in Toronto. Working by day in a nearby printing house, Odrach returned home at night to focus on his writing. Odrach produced novels, short stories, and articles for local Ukrainian newspapers. As his books were banned in the Soviet Union, he depended on the small Western immigrant community for his readership. Odrach's major works were written in his Toronto home. Odrach suffered a fatal stroke in 1964.

== Books translated into English ==
Wave of Terror, Chicago Review Press, 2008, detailing the horrors of living under Joseph Stalin. It was Odrach's first novel to appear in English. Translated by his daughter, Erma Odrach. "Odrach's delightfully sardonic novel about Stalinist occupation...is rich with history, horror and comedy."

The Village Teacher and Other Stories, Glagoslav Publications, 2022. The stories are set during WW2, with unexpected glimpses of civility and humaneness against backgrounds of conflict. Translated by his daughter, Erma Odrach. "Cataclysmic events are placed alongside everyday ones to great effect."

== Bibliography ==
- В Дорозі, 1955
- Щебетун, 1957
- Півстанок за Cелом, 1959
- Покинута Оселя, 1960
- На Непевному Грунті, 1962
- Вощадь, 1972 (published posthumously)
- Wave of Terror, 2008
- The Village Teacher and Other Stories, 2022
