= Dzivin =

Agrotown in Brest Region, Belarus

Dzivin Дзівін (Belarusian)
- Agrotown
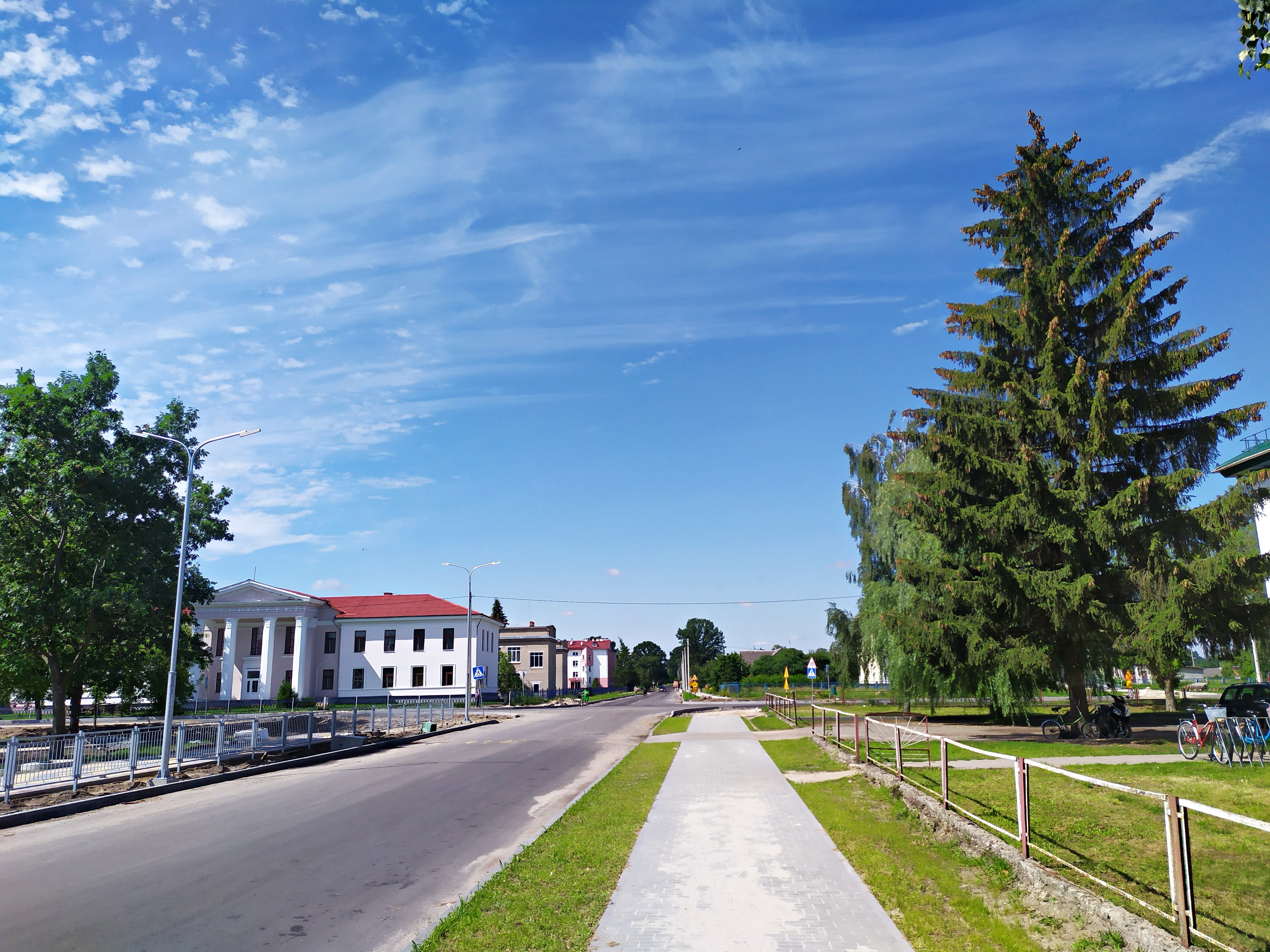

- Location within Belarus
- Coordinates: 51°57′27″N 24°34′30″E
- Country: Belarus
- Region: Brest Region
- District: Kobryn District
- Time zone: UTC+3 (MSK)

Dzivin (also Dyvin; Belarusian: Дзівін; Russian: Дивин, romanized: Divin; Ukrainian: Дивин, romanized: Dyvyn; Polish: Dywin) is an agrotown in Kobryn District, Brest Region, in south-western Belarus. It serves as the administrative center of Dzivin selsoviet.

Dzivin is situated in the historical region of Polesia, on the southern bank of the Pripyat and at the Kobryn-Kovel road. It is located near the borders with Poland and Ukraine.

== History ==
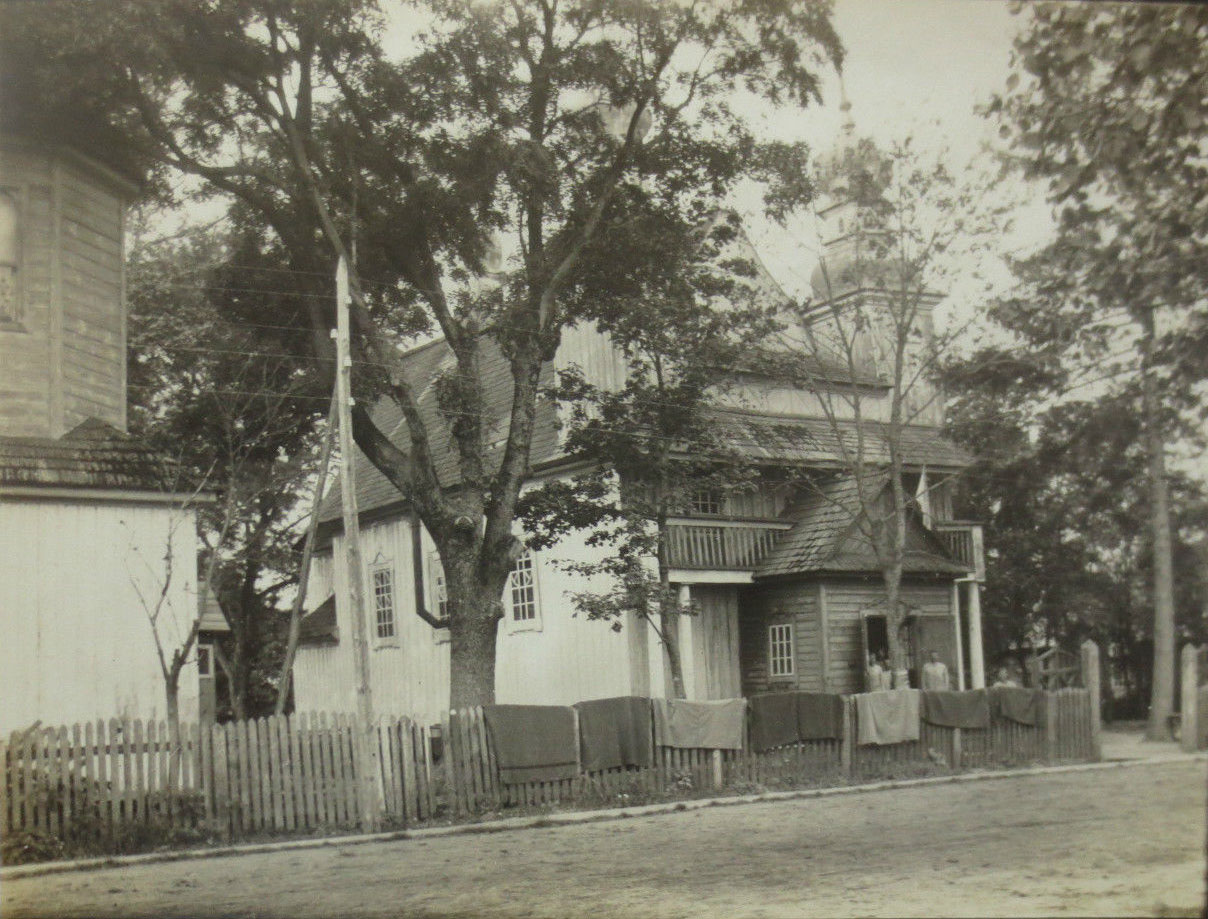
Dzivin in 1917

First mentioned in 1466, around 1546 the village of Dyvin received town rights. Around that time the town had 184 houses, a market square and five streets in total. In 1642 king of Poland Władysław IV Vasa granted the burghers with Magdeburg Law. The charter however was withdrawn by king Stanisław August Poniatowski in 1776. In 1795 the town was annexed by the Russian Empire in the effect of the Third Partition of Poland. Two years later the town, by then demoted to a mere village, was donated to Pyotr Rumyantsev as his personal property and its inhabitants were turned into serfs. In the 1870s, located on a route connecting the cities of Kobryn and Kowel, it had four mills, two Orthodox churches, once Catholic church and a synagogue.

The town returned to Poland after it regained independence following World War I, confirmed in the 1921 Peace of Riga. In the 1921 Polish census, 80.2% people declared Polish nationality, 12.7% Belarusian, 6.7% Ukrainian and 0.3% Jewish. Soon however the town was downgraded to a village again and attached to a gmina of Dywin, part of Kobryn County in Polesie Voivodeship.

Following the invasion of Poland at the start of World War II in September 1939, Dywin was first occupied by the Soviet Union until 1941, then by Nazi Germany until 1944. The Jews of the town were imprisoned in a ghetto before being murdered in a mass execution in 1942 In October 1942, the first detachment of the Ukrainian Insurgent Army was created in the settlement. In 1944, the settlement was re-occupied by the Soviet Union, which eventually annexed it from Poland in 1945.

Historical population
Year	Pop.	±%
1878	2,490	—
1921	2,299	−7.7%

It was made a town and a centre of a district, but in 1959 it was demoted back to a village. Since 1991, it has been part of independent Belarus.
