= Natalka Babina =

Belarusian journalist and writer

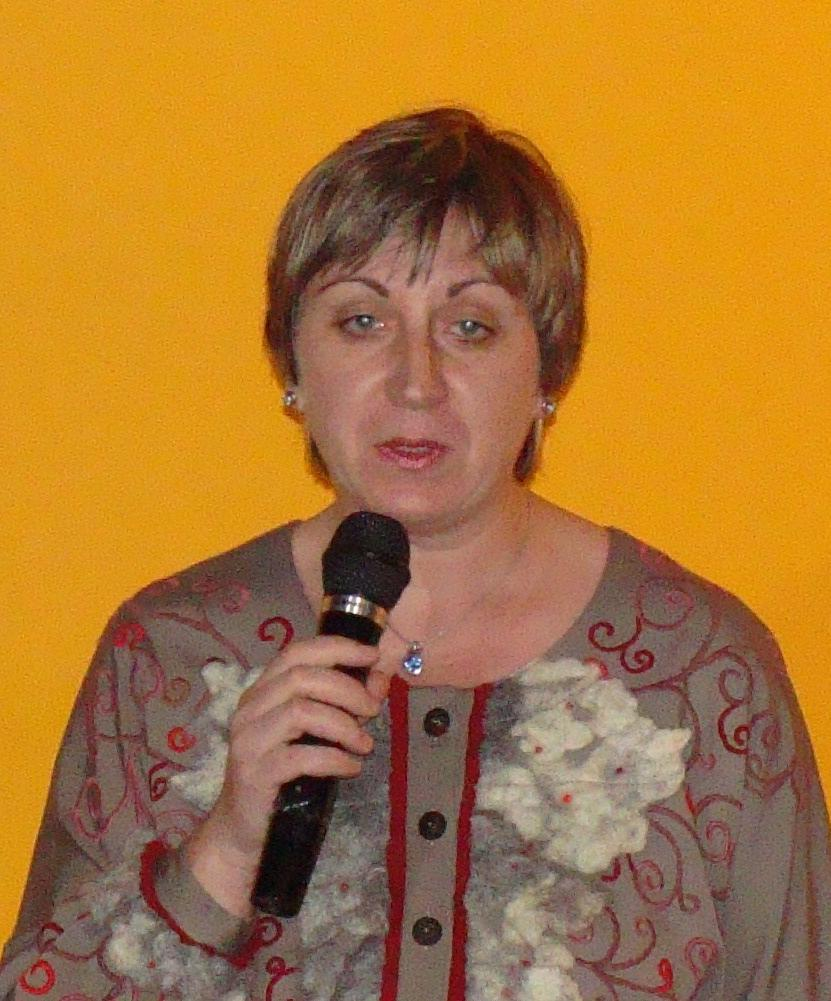

Natalka Babina (Belarusian and Ukrainian: Наталка Бабіна; born on 15 May 1966 in Zakazanka) is a Belarusian writer of Ukrainian origin. In 2010, she became a laureate of the Cherkasova BAJ Prize. In 2011, she was a finalist of the Angelus Central European Literature Award. She studied engineering at the Belarusian National Technical University, and began publishing her works in 1994, and her books have been translated into Polish, Czech, Ukrainian and English.

== Bibliography ==
- Babina, Natalka (2007). Žančyny vychodzjac· z-pad kantrolju: belaruskae žanočae apavjadan·ne (in Belarusian). Lohvinaŭ. ISBN 978-985-6800-44-6. OCLC 219149190.
- Babina, Natalka (2009). Pakachaj mjane, kali laska: zbornik sučasnaj žanočaj belaruskaj prozy (in Belarusian). Knihazbor. ISBN 978-985-6930-41-9. OCLC 730968452.
- Babina, Natalka; Dingley, Jim; Stein, Camilla (2013). Down among the fishes. Glagoslav Publications. ISBN 978-1-78267-076-6. OCLC 859560099.
- Babina, Natalka (2019). Бодай Будка: роман (in Ukrainian). Folio. ISBN 978-966-03-8942-7. OCLC 1193252166.
