= Kobrinsky Uyezd =

Subdivision of the Grodno Governorate of the Russian Empire

Kobrinsky Uyezd (Russian: Кобринский уезд) was one of the nine subdivisions of the Grodno Governorate of the Russian Empire. It was situated in the southeastern part of the governorate. Its administrative centre was Kobryn (Kobrin).

== Demographics ==
At the time of the Russian Empire Census of 1897, Kobrinsky Uyezd had a population of 184,453. Of these, 79.6% spoke Ukrainian, 13.7% Yiddish, 3.1% Russian, 2.2% Polish, 0.8% Belarusian, 0.1% Tatar, 0.1% Mordvin and 0.1% German as their native language.
