= Belostoksky Uyezd =

Subdivision of the Grodno Governorate of the Russian Empire

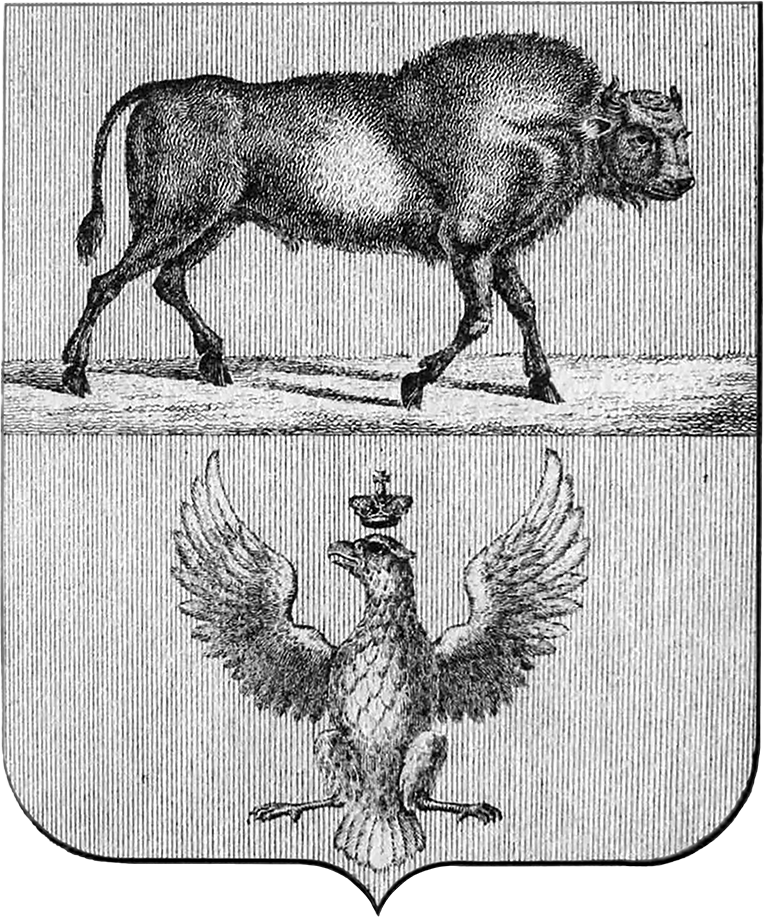
Coats of arms of Belostoksky Uyezd, approved on April 6, 1845

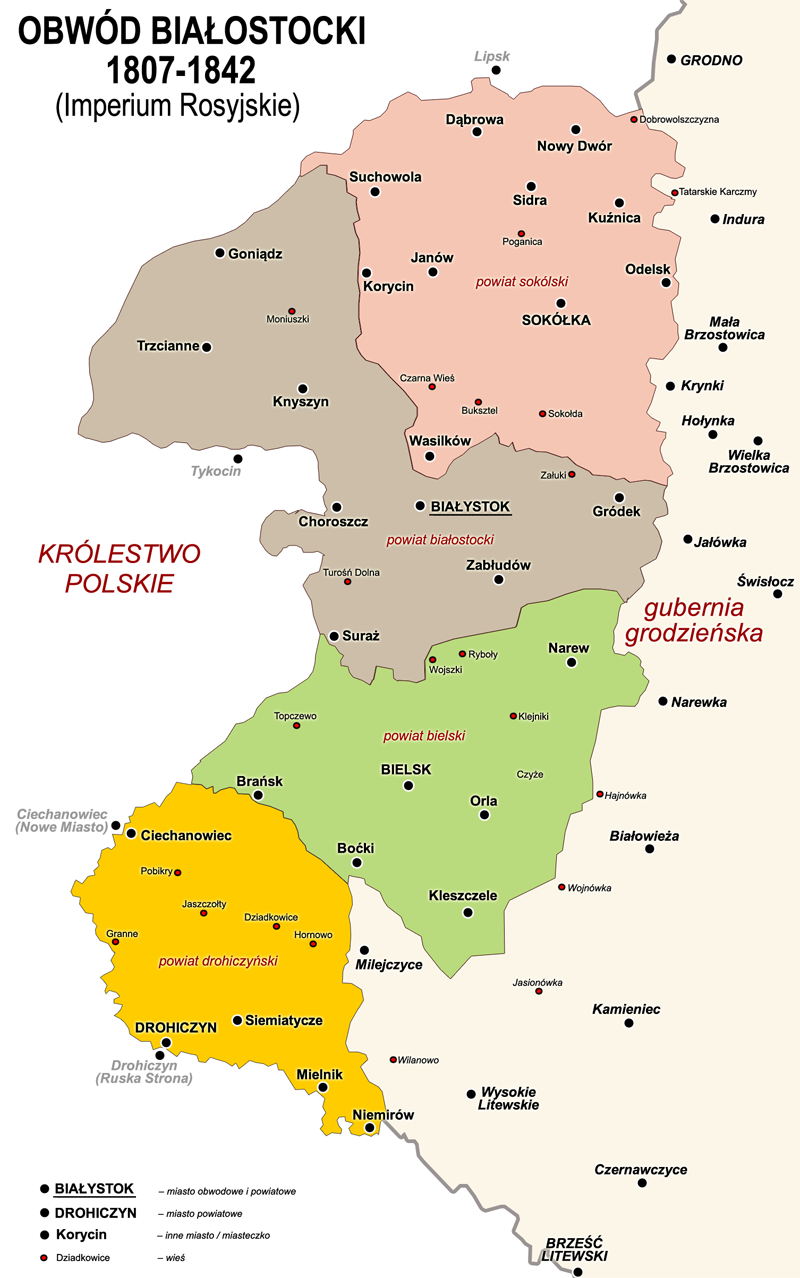
Belostok Oblast, 1807-1842

Belostoksky Uyezd (Russian: Белостокский уезд, Polish: Powiat białostocki, Belarusian: Беластоцкі павет) was one of the subdivisions of the Grodno Governorate of the Russian Empire. It was situated in the northwestern part of the governorate. Its administrative centre was Białystok.

== Demographics ==
At the time of the Russian Empire Census of 1897, Belostoksky Uyezd had a population of 206,615. Of these, 34.0% spoke Polish, 28.3% Yiddish, 26.1% Belarusian, 6.7% Russian, 3.6% German, 0.3% Ukrainian, 0.3% Chuvash, 0.3% Tatar, 0.2% Bashkir and 0.1% Lithuanian as their native language.
