= Kobryn district =

District of Brest region, Belarus

Kobryn district Кобрынскі раён (Belarusian) Кобринский район (Russian)
- District
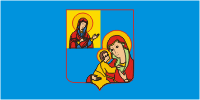
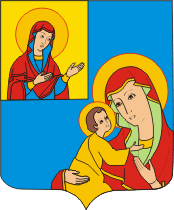
- Flag Coat of arms

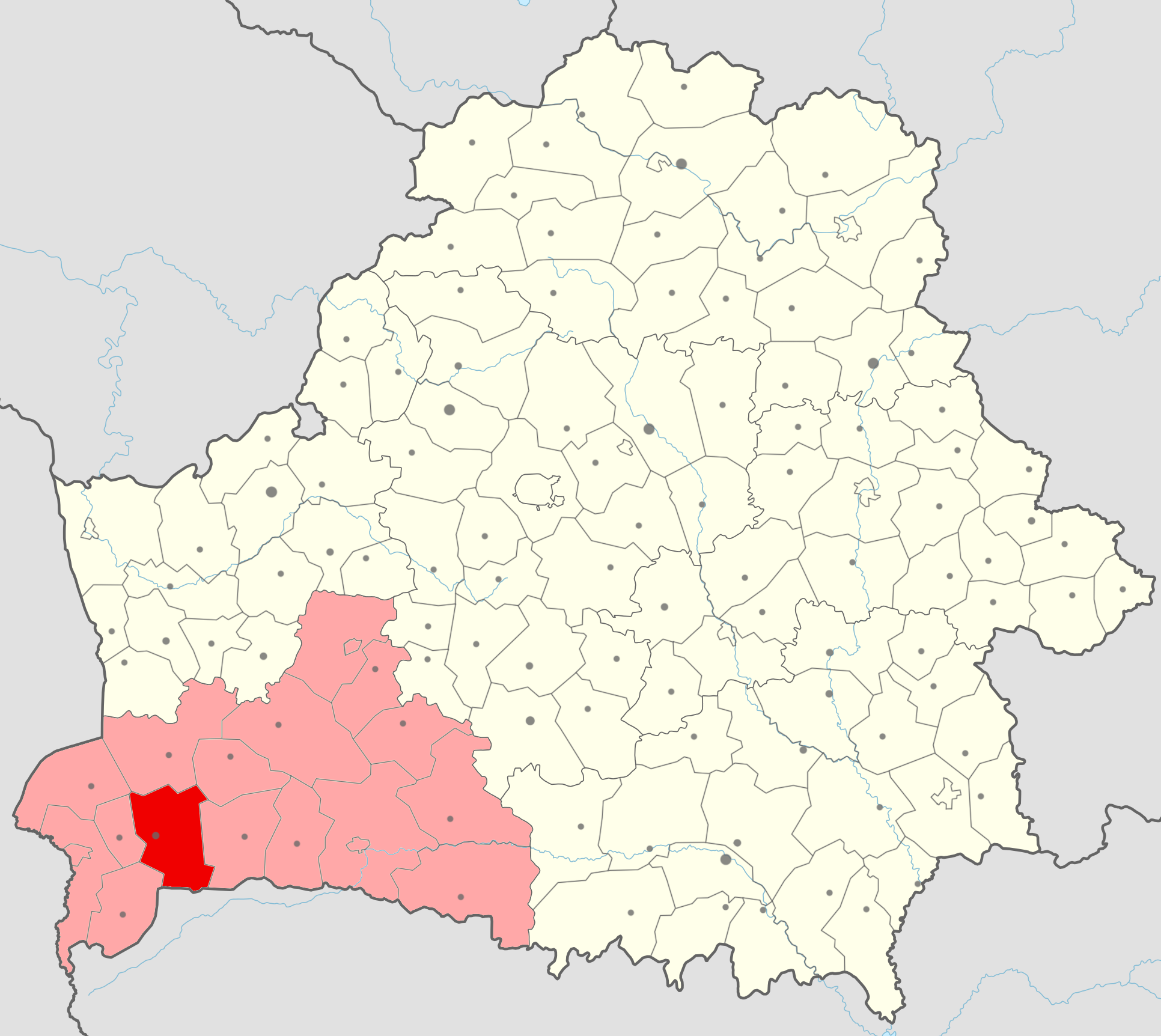
- Coordinates: 52°12′46″N 24°22′18″E
- Country: Belarus
- Region: Brest region
- Established: January 15, 1940
- Administrative center: Kobryn

Area
  - District: 2,039 km^{2} (787 sq mi)

Population (2024)
  - District: 81,672
  - Urban: 52,635
  - Rural: 29,037
- Time zone: UTC+3 (MSK)
- Website: kobrin.brest-region.by

Kobryn district (Belarusian: Кобрынскі раён; Russian: Кобринский район) is a district (raion) of Brest region in Belarus. Its administrative center is Kobryn. There are 162 settlements in the district, of which one is urban and 161 are rural. Rural settlements are part of 11 selsoviets. As of 2024, the district has a population of 81,672.

== Demographics ==
According to the 2009 Belarusian census, the district had a population of 88,037 people, of which 51,166 people lived in Kobryn, and the remaining 36,871 in rural areas. 87.9% are of Belarusian, 6.1% Russian, 4.5% Ukrainian and 0.6% Polish ethnicity. 51.2% speak Russian and 43.1% Belarusian as their native language. In 2023, it had a population of 82,198.

== Tourism ==
Among the attractions of the area 15 archeological monuments, 26 architectural monuments, 3 historical monument, the park is named after Suvorov.

Among the monuments in the local account, there are: 12 archeological sites; 9 ancient tombs and boulders; 35 monuments of the cult-building; 9 estates; 3 historical monument and a memorial plaque dedicated to the War of 1812; 9 historical monuments from the First World War and the Russo-Polish War (6 military cemeteries from World War I); 5 historical times Kobrinschiny part II of Poland; 93 monuments of the Second World War; 14 monuments of the famous countrymen and government leaders. Also near the village tract in Lyahchitsy Kniazha Mountain is the tomb, which is buried in the national tradition Saint Olga.

== See also ==
- The Holocaust in Kobryn District
