= Brestsky uezd =

Subdivision of the Grodno Governorate of the Russian Empire

Brestsky uezd (Note: Russian: Бре́стский уе́зд, pre-reform orthography: Брестскій уѣздъ; Belarusian: Брэсцкі павет; Taraškievica: Берасьцейскі павет; Ukrainian: Берестейський повіт) was one of the nine subdivisions of the Grodno Governorate of the Russian Empire. It was situated in the southwestern part of the governorate. Its administrative centre was Brest (Brest-Litovsk).

== Demographics ==
At the time of the Russian Empire Census of 1897, Brestsky uezd had a population of 218,432. Of these, 64.4% spoke Ukrainian, 20.8% Yiddish, 8.1% Russian, 3.9% Polish, 1.8% Belarusian, 0.2% German, 0.2% Tatar, 0.2% Mordvin and 0.1% Latvian as their native language.
