= Grodno Governorate =

1801–1918 unit of Russia

Grodno Governorate Гродненская губерния
- Governorate
- Coat of arms

- Location in the Russian Empire

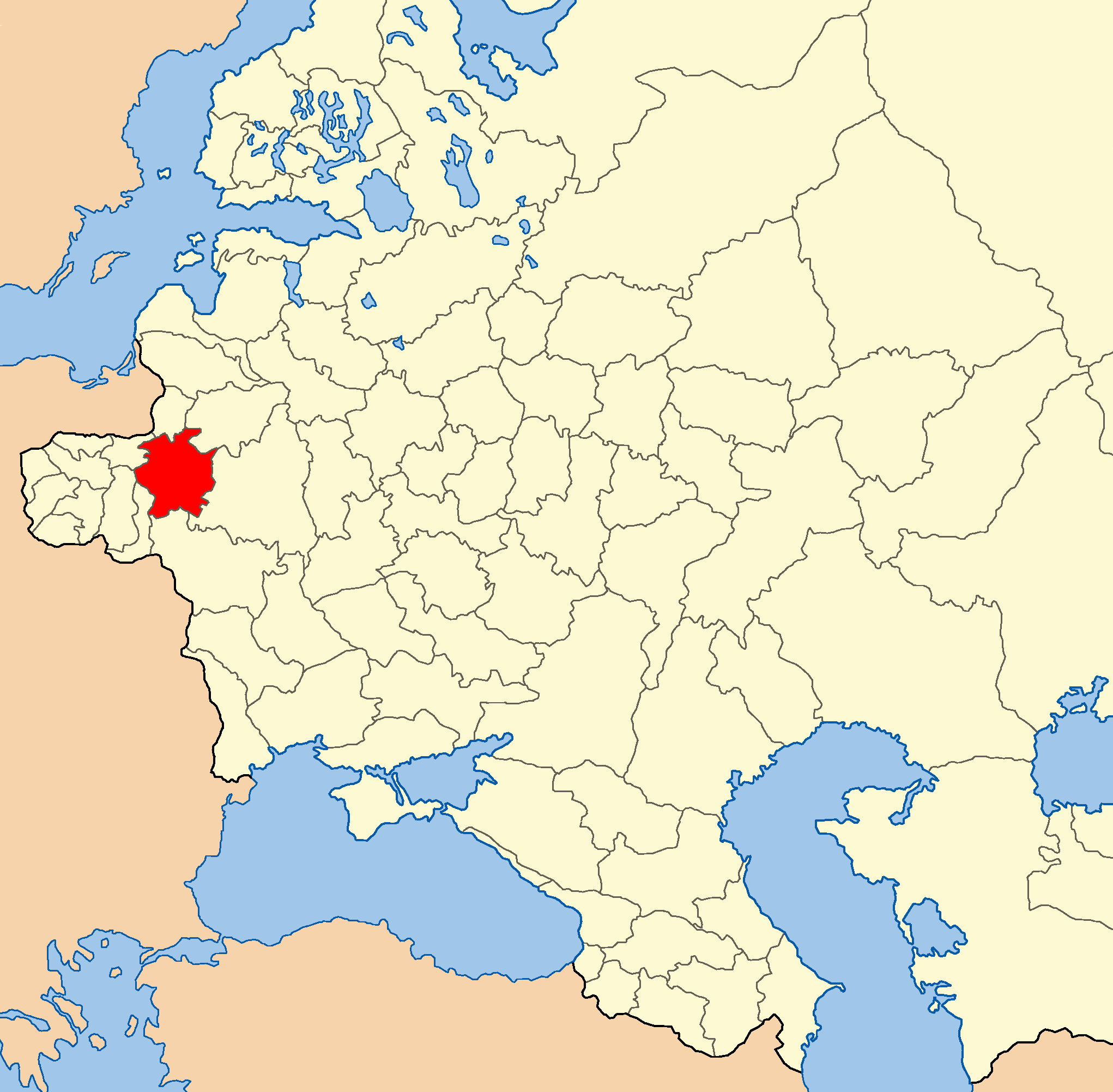
- Location in the western part of the Russian Empire
- Country: Russian Empire
- Krai: Northwestern
- Established: 1801
- Abolished: 1918
- Capital: Grodno

Area
  - Total: 38,671.5 km^{2} (14,931.1 sq mi)

Population (1897)
  - Total: 1,603,409
  - Density: 41.4623/km^{2} (107.387/sq mi)
  - Urban: 15.60%
  - Rural: 84.40%

Northwestern Krai Governorates

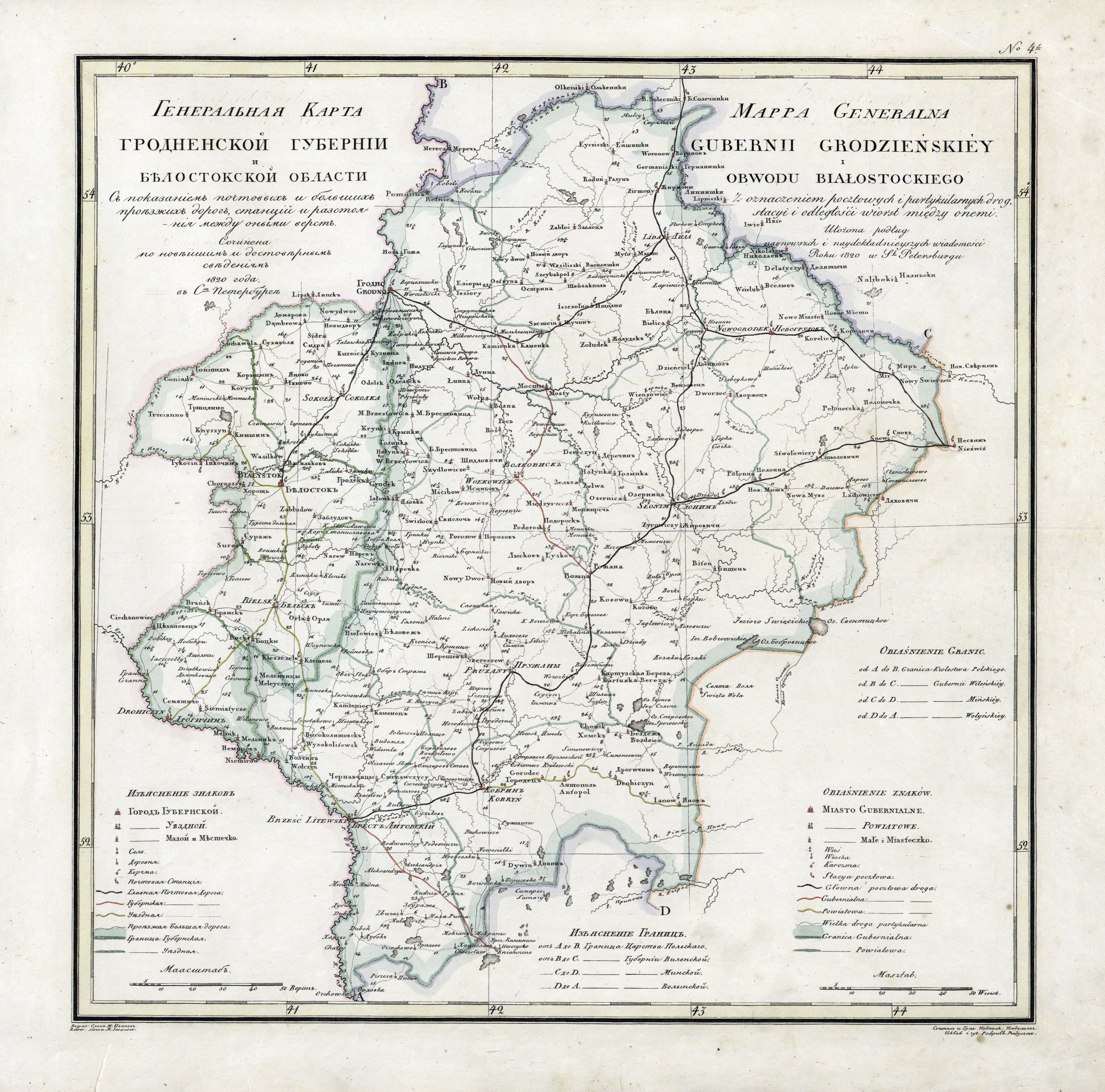
1821 Grodno Governorate Map (in Russian and Polish)

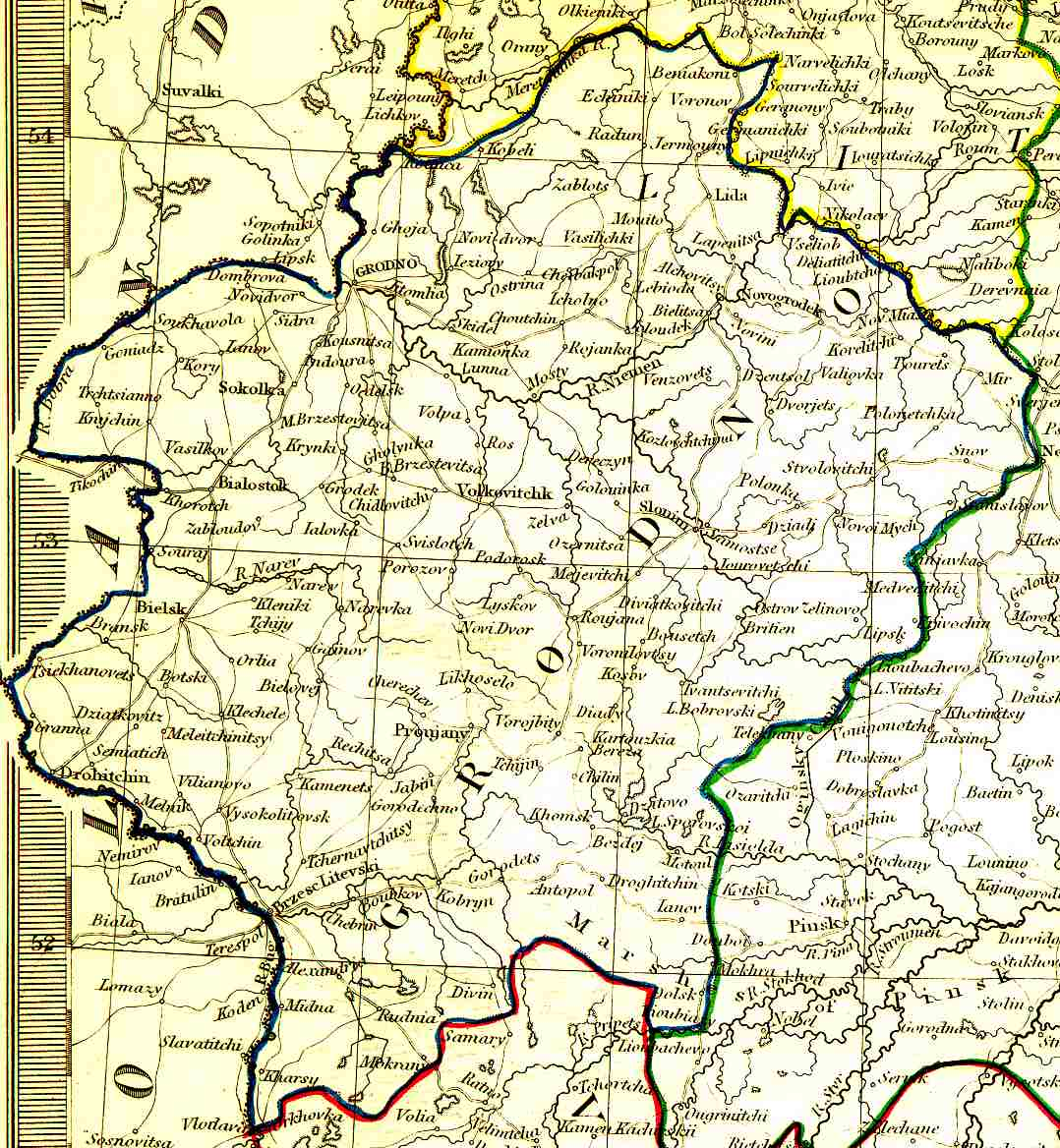
1834 Grodno Governorate Map

Grodno Governorate (in Russian)

Grodno Governorate (Note: Russian: Гродненская губерния, pre-1918: Гродненская губернія, romanized: Grodnenskaya guberniya; Belarusian: Гродзенская губерня, romanized: Hrodzienskaya gubernia; Polish: Gubernia grodzieńska; Lithuanian: Gardino gubernija) was an administrative-territorial unit (guberniya) of the Northwestern Krai of the Russian Empire, with its capital in Grodno. It encompassed 38,671.5 square kilometres (14,931.1 mi^{2}) in area and consisted of a population of 1,603,409 inhabitants by 1897. Grodno Governorate was bordered by Suwałki Governorate to the north, Vilna Governorate to the northeast, Minsk Governorate to the east, Volhynia Governorate to the south, Kholm Governorate to the west, and Łomża Governorate to the northwest. The governorate covered the areas of modern-day Grodno Region of Belarus, part of the Podlaskie Voivodeship of Poland, and a small part of Druskininkai, Lazdijai and Varėna districts of Lithuania.

== Overview ==
Grodno, a western province or governorate of the former Russian Empire, currently located in Belarus, was situated between about 52° to 54° N latitude and 21° to 24° E longitude, and bounded N by Vilna E by Minsk S by Volhynia and W by the former kingdom of Poland. Its land size was 14,961 square miles (38,750 km^{2}). The province was a wide plain in parts, very swampy and covered with large pine tree forests. Of these, that of Białowieża in the district of comprising a circuit of over 100 miles (160 km) deserves notice. There, bisons were preserved. The navigable rivers are Niemen, Bug, Narev, and Bobra, the most important of those being the Bug. The soil is chiefly alluvial intermixed with sand waws, which was favorable for agriculture anil, rearing of cattle and bees. The atmosphere was damp, misty and the climate in winter was cold. Large quantities of rye, barley, oats, hops, hemp and flax were raised but the amount of fruit and vegetables grown was small. The products produced in the region were insignificant, but included woolen cloths, hats, leather, paper and spirits. There also a good export trade in grain, wool, cattle. Some forty fairs were held annually in the province.

It was divided into nine districts:

- Grodno,
- Brest,
- Bielsk,
- Volkovysk,
- Kobryn,
- Prushana,
- Slonim
- Belostok.

The administration of the whole province was in the governor appointed by the crown. In 1870 the population was 1,008,521 comprising Lithuanians, Poles, Belarusians, Tartars, and a few German colonists. Grodno's capital was Grodno, on the right bank of the Niemen, and was connected by railway with Moscow and Warsaw. It contained eight Roman Catholic, one Eastern and two United Greek Catholic churches, a chapel, and two Jewish synagogues. There were two fine erected respectively by Stephen Batory who died here 1586 and Augustus III (kings of Poland). Among other buildings were a public library, a school of a gymnasium, and several seminaries. The 24,789 were engaged in the manufacture of woolen hats, paper, and the preparation of wax. Three fairs were held annually.

Grodno was built in the 12th century until 1795 belonged to the Grand Duchy of Lithuania. The diet held there in 1793 ratified the partition of Poland. Two years later Stanislaus, the last king, signed his abdication there.

Stanisław Plater's estimates in 1825
Language	People	Percentage of total
Ruthenians	470,000	58,75%
Yiddish	120,000	15%
Lithuanian	100,000	12,5%
Polish	80,000	10%
Russians	20,000	2,5%
Tatars	10,000	1,25%
Total	800,000	100%

Stanisław Plater's estimates in 1825
Religion	People	Percentage of total
Roman Catholic	380,000	47,5%
Eastern Catholic	270,000	33,75%
Judaism	120,000	15%
Old Believers	20,000	2,5%
Muslims	10,000	1,25%
Total	800,000	100%

== Administrative divisions ==
The seat was in Grodno. It divided into 9 Uyezds:

- Grodnensky Uyezd (Russian: Гродно)
- Belostoksky Uyezd (Russian: Белосток)
- Belsky Uyezd (Russian: Бельскъ)
- Brestsky Uyezd (Russian: Брестъ-Литовскiй)
- Kobrinsky Uyezd (Russian: Кобринъ)
- Pruzhansky Uyezd (Russian: Пружаны)
- Sokolsky Uyezd (Russian: Соколька)
- Slonimsky Uyezd (Russian: Cлонимъ)
- Volkovyssky Uyezd (Russian: Волкавывскъ)

== History ==
=== Slonim Governorate (1795–1796) ===
The governorate was formed in 1796, in the aftermath of the final partition of Polish-Lithuanian Commonwealth, and originally known as Slonim Governorate, but that only existed until December 12, 1796, when Paul I merged it with Vilna Governorate to form Lithuania Governorate.

The Slonim Governorate had 8 provinces:

- Brest (Russian: Брестского)
- Volkovysskij (Russian: Волковыского)
- Grodno (Russian: Гродненского)
- Kobrin (Russian: Кобринского)
- Lida (Russian: Лидского)
- Novogrudok (Russian: Новогрудского)
- Pruzhany (Russian: Пружанского)
- Slonimsky (Russian: Слонимского)

=== Lithuania Governorate (1796–1801) ===
Just a year later, on December 12, 1796, by order of Tsar Paul I they were merged into one governorate, called the Lithuanian Governorate, with its capital in Vilnius.

=== Lithuania-Grodno Governorate (1801–1840) ===
After Paul's death, by order of Tsar Alexander I on September 9, 1801, the Lithuanian Governorate was split into the Lithuania-Vilnius Governorate and the Lithuania-Grodno Governorate. The Lithuania-Grodno Governorate was restored within the borders of 1796 Slonim Governorate.

The Lithuania-Grodno Governorate had 8 provinces:

- Brest (Russian: Брестского)
- Volkovysskij (Russian: Волковыского)
- Grodno (Russian: Гродненского)
- Kobrin (Russian: Кобринского)
- Lida (Russian: Лидского)
- Novogrudok (Russian: Новогрудского)
- Pruzhany (Russian: Пружанского)
- Slonimsky (Russian: Слонимского)
- Sokolka Province (Russian: Соколька)

=== Grodno Governorate (1840–1870) ===
In 1840 the word "Lithuania" was dropped from the name by Nicholas I.

In 1843, another administrative reform took place. The Vilnius Governorate received the Lida district from the Grodno Governorate and the Belostok Oblast was incorporated into it as the districts of Belostok, Belsk and Sokolka. Also, Novogrudok one to Minsk Governorate

The Grodno Governorate had 9 provinces:

- Brest (Russian: Брестского)
- Volkovysskij (Russian: Волковыского)
- Grodno (Russian: Гродненского)
- Kobrin (Russian: Кобринского)
- Pruzhany (Russian: Пружанского)
- Slonimsky (Russian: Слонимского)
- Belostok Province (Russian: Белосток)
- Belsk Province (Russian: Бельскъ)
- Sokolka Province (Russian: Соколька)

=== World War I and after ===
==== Bialystok-Grodno District (1915–1917) ====
The Grodno Governorate was occupied by the German Empire in 1915 during the Battle of Vilnius in World War I. It was known as the Bialystok-Grodno District of Ober Ost until February 1, 1918, when it was integrated into the Lithuania District as its southern part. From then, until November 1918, it was part of the Kingdom of Lithuania.

==== After 1918 ====
On December 1–2, 1918, a congress in Grodno, consisting of several hundred delegates from the whole of the Grodno Governorate (including Białystok, Sokółka, Brest Litovsk, Slonim, Vawkavysk, Bielsk, Pruzhany etc.) voted to join Lithuania. The delegates declared that all authority should rest with the region's inhabitants. Given Grodno Governorate's historical and economic ties to Lithuania, they resolved to annex the Grodno Region to Lithuania while granting it autonomy rights. The congress participants assigned the implementation of this decision to the elected executive body – the Grodno Region's Belarusian Board.

After the Treaty of Riga on 18 March 1921, which ended the Polish–Soviet War, the governorate became the voivodeships of Białystok, Nowogródek and Polesie of the Second Polish Republic.

== Governors ==
- General Maurice de Lacy of Grodno (died 1820)
- Mikhail Muravyov (1830–1831)

== Sources ==
- Surgailis, Gintautas (2020). Lietuvos kariuomenės gudų kariniai daliniai 1918–1923 m. (PDF) (in Lithuanian). Vilnius: General Jonas Žemaitis Military Academy of Lithuania. ISBN 978-609-8277-00-5.
- Plater, Stanisław (1825). Jeografia wschodniéy części Europy czyli Opis krajów przez wielorakie narody słowiańskie zamieszkanych : obejmujący Prussy, Xsięztwo Poznańskie, Szląsk Pruski, Gallicyą, Rzeczpospolitę Krakowską, Krolestwo Polskie i Litwę [Geography of the Eastern Part of Europe, or Description of the Countries inhabited by Various Slavic Nations: Including Prussia, the Duchy of Posen, Prussian Silesia, Galicia, the Republic of Cracow, the Kingdom of Poland, and Lithuania] (in Polish). Wrocław: Wilhelm Bogumił Korn.
