= Crisis of the late 16th century in Russia =

Series of Russian economic and societal disasters (1560s–1570s)

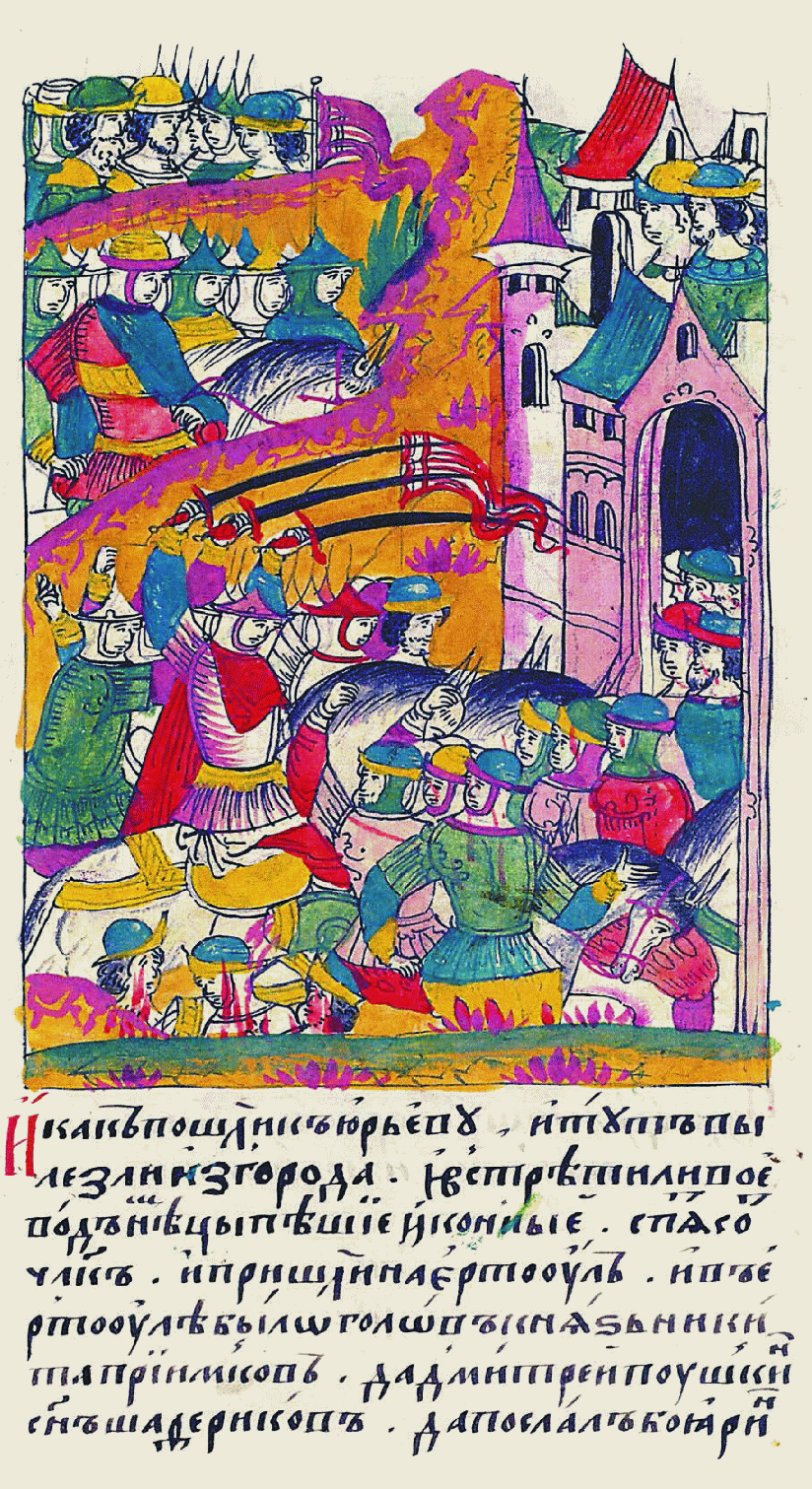
The Livonian War was one of the triggers of the crisis which in turn hampered Russian military effort

Russia suffered from an economic and social crisis in the second half of the 16th century which led to famines, depopulation and the abandonment of agricultural lands. The economic crisis overlapped with the oprichnina and happened at the time when Russia waged the Livonian War. The crisis is considered to be one of the precursors of the Time of Troubles.

== Crisis of 1560-1570s ==
The crisis started with the poor harvest of 1567. The taxes had risen significantly in the previous decades as the state waged expensive wars against the Tatars in the east and against Poland and Sweden in the west. The population growth in the previous century led to overpopulation and peasants having insufficient food reserves. Famine ensued with grain prices increasing 8-10 times and remaining high after another poor harvest in 1568. The famine continued in 1570 when a pestilence hit Russia too. In spite of the efforts to contain outbreaks the epidemic spread in Central and Northern Russia. Many localities were depopulated and there were reports of cannibalism. The more dense urban population especially suffered and some towns lost nearly all their inhabitants. Kolomna had only 12 tax-paying households in 1578 while in Murom most of the households and shops were deserted.

The sack of Novgorod by Ivan IV's oprichniki contributed to the crisis in the north-west. As part of his attack Ivan burned the fields, laying waste roughly 90 percent of the arable land surrounding Novgorod. Coupled with the crop failures of the years before, this would create a massive food shortage (and cause supply problems for Russia in the Livonian war). Both nobles and common people were put to death and the frequent changes of land ownership impacted the economy negatively. A contemporary chronicler from Pskov wrote "The Tsar instituted oprichnina and from thence the great desolation of the Russian land."

The crisis weakened the state considerably. The Crimean Tatars attacked Russia in 1571 burning down Moscow, devastating large areas of the country and carrying 100,000 prisoners into slavery. In the 1570s the earlier gains made by Russia in Livonia were lost and some additional territory was lost to Sweden.

The contemporaries called the crisis porukha (поруха) which could be translated as damage, loss or calamity. The peasants of the Joseph-Volokolamsk Monastery explained the drop in land under cultivation by a combination of the pestilence, Tatar raids, bad harvests and heavy taxation.

== Aftermath and consequences ==
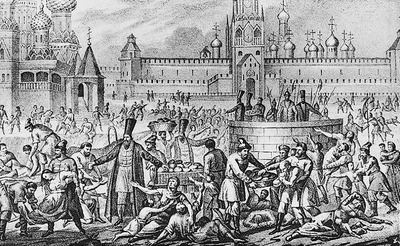
Boris Chorikov - "Famine in Moscow under Boris Godunov" (ill. from the book “Picturesque Karamzin”, 1836)

The acute phase of the crisis was over when Fedor I assumed the throne in 1584. A significant share of arable land was deserted. The North-West was hit the hardest by the war, oprichnina, famine and epidemics. The population of the Novgorod region fell by more than 80%, with the records of Derevskaya district showing that one third of cultivated land was deserted due to mortality. In the central regions of Russia, the Moscow area suffered the Crimean Tatar raid and had 90% of cultivated land abandoned. Elsewhere in the centre, from 18 to 60 per cent of peasant holdings were abandoned due to mortality and migration. This was one of the most severe demographic disasters experienced by Russia.

As a consequence of population decline the wages increased significantly and the land rents decreased. The wages of labourers in Vologda and in Joseph-Volokolamsk Monastery grew by 2.5 times in grain terms. At the same time the quit-rent (obrok) and corvee obligations decreased by 2-3 times. The landowners, mostly belonging to the service class, thus experienced a fall in their income and many estates were left with no peasants at all. The Russian army which consisted mostly of mounted service class people lost half of its number as a result. The enserfment intensified after the crisis during the reigns of Fedor I and Boris Godunov as the nobility tried to tie down the remaining peasants to the land. The state taxes paid by peasant household declined significantly as well and correspondingly the state revenues shrank. Some historians say that the crisis led to mass migration to the southern frontier and the newly conquered Volga region, while others consider it unlikely as these regions experienced invasions and rebellions at the same time.

The recovery was slow and some historians say that the crisis was not over by the end of the 16th century. According to Turchin and Nefedov the imbalance between the increasing elite numbers and declining commoner population was not resolved and became one of the reasons of the Time of Troubles.

== Bibliography ==
- Каштанов, С. М.; Столярова, Л. В. (2020). Иван Грозный и его время [Ivan the Terrible and his time] (in Russian). ДиректМедиа. ISBN 9785449912459.
- Платонов, С. Ф. (2022). Иван Грозный. Борис Годунов. Смутное время [Ivan the Terrible, Boris Godunov, Time of Troubles] (in Russian). Litres. ISBN 9785041136598.
- Turchin, Peter; Nefedov, Sergey A. (2009). Secular Cycles. Princeton University Press. ISBN 9780691136967.
- Колычева, Евгения Ивановна (1987). Аграрный строй России XVI в. [The agrarian system of Russia in the 16th century] (in Russian). Наука.
- Шишков, Александр (2005). "Очищение от Смуты" [Cleansing from Troubles]. Родина (российский исторический журнал) (in Russian). 11. ISSN 0235-7089.
- Riasanovsky, Nicholas V. (2000). A History of Russia. Oxford University Press. p. 152. ISBN 0195121791.
