= Boris Grekov =

Russian historian of Kievan Rus and the Golden Horde (1882–1953)

- Борис Греков
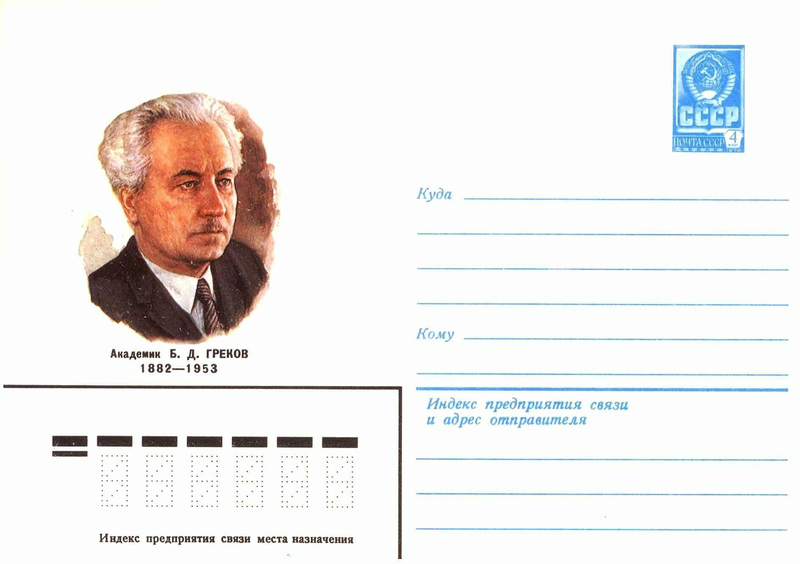
- Soviet envelope depicting Boris Grekov
- Born: 21 April 1882; Mirgorod, Poltava Governorate, Russian Empire
- Died: 9 September 1953 (aged 71); Moscow, Russian Soviet Federative Socialist Republic
- Title: Doctor of historical sciences Academician of the Academy of Sciences of the Soviet Union
- Awards: (x3) (×2) Medal "For Valiant Labour in the Great Patriotic War 1941–1945"

Academic background
- Education: Imperial Moscow University
- Doctoral advisor: Sergey Platonov, Matvey Lyubavsky, Dmitry Petrushevsky

Academic work
- Discipline: History of Russia
- Institutions: Moscow State University; Leningrad State University; Tavrida National V.I. Vernadsky University; Academy of Sciences of the Soviet Union; Polish Academy of Sciences; Bulgarian Academy of Sciences; Serbian Academy of Sciences and Arts
- Main interests: History the Middle Ages, history of the peasantry

Boris Dmitrievich Grekov (Russian: Борис Дмитрович Греков; 21 April [O.S. 9 April] 1882 – 9 September 1953) was a Russian and Soviet historian noted for his comprehensive studies of Kievan Rus and the Golden Horde. He was a member of the Soviet Academy of Sciences (1934) and several foreign academies, as well as Director of the Saint Petersburg Institute of History and the Russian History Institute in Moscow.

Grekov entered Warsaw University in 1901 but moved to the Moscow University four years later. During the pre-revolutionary years he researched the economic and social history of the Novgorod Republic (published in 1914).

Grekov was accused of participating in the White Movement in the Crimea during the civil war, and in 1930, his son was arrested in connection with the "Platonov Affair" and sent to the Solovki Islands Penal Colony. Both of these facts were widely known in the 1930s, and this led Grekov to make wide-ranging concessions to the official ideology during the Stalin Purges and, according to A. H. Plakhonin, to write scholarship "on order" for the regime.

At this time, he turned toward the study of Kievan Rus' and became known as an opponent of the Ukrainian historian Mykhailo Hrushevsky, who claimed the heritage of Kievan Rus' primarily for modern Ukraine. His major work, Kievan Rus' appeared in 1939 and was the first of three of his works to win the Stalin Prize. In this work, steeped in Marxist–Leninist ideology, he stressed the agricultural rather than commercial basis of the economy of this polity and argued that the heritage of Kievan Rus' was equally shared by modern Russia, Ukraine, and Belarus.

Grekov's extensive research on Kievan Rus' provided insights into the economic and cultural development of medieval Rus' during the period of the Tatar domination. He summarized these findings in Culture of Kiev Rus (1944) and Russian Peasants from the Most Ancient Times to the Seventeenth Century (1946). But his most lasting work (and the one which is still regularly reprinted) was Golden Horde, written in collaboration with Alexander Yakubovsky and first published in 1937. The second (and now classical) edition appeared in 1950 under the title Golden Horde and Its Downfall.

Grekov also gave considerable attention to the collection and publication of primary sources, especially chronicles. His student, Vladimir Pashuto, carried this work forward and began the collection of foreign sources for the medieval period in the history of the Eastern Slavs.

In December 2022 the Akademika (Boris) Grekov street in Kyiv, Ukraine was renamed to (Righteous Among the Nations) Glagolevy Family street.

== Assessment of his work ==
B. D. Grekov devoted considerable attention to collecting and publishing numerous primary sources, especially historical chronicles. At the same time, S. N. Chernov described Grekov’s attitude toward sources — in particular, toward the Primary Chronicle — as “to a certain extent utilitarian.”

According to V. B. Kobrin, “in B. D. Grekov’s works, today’s reader is struck by the combination of broad erudition and high professional culture with the schematic nature of conclusions that fit precisely into the Procrustean bed of the formation theory as it was set out in the Short Course of the History of the CPSU(B).” At the same time, it is noted that Grekov formulated and defended in scholarly debates a concept of Russian feudalism that contradicted the thesis contained in the Short Course that all peoples must necessarily pass through five formations.

A. A. Shennikov wrote that during the Stalinist period B. D. Grekov was “almost officially proclaimed the ‘father of Soviet historical science’” and was regarded as such not only during his lifetime but for about another decade after his death, while his views were not subject to criticism.
