= Sack of Moscow (1571) =

Crimean Khan's action in Russia

Fire of Moscow (1571)
- Part of the Russo-Crimean Wars and the Russo-Turkish wars
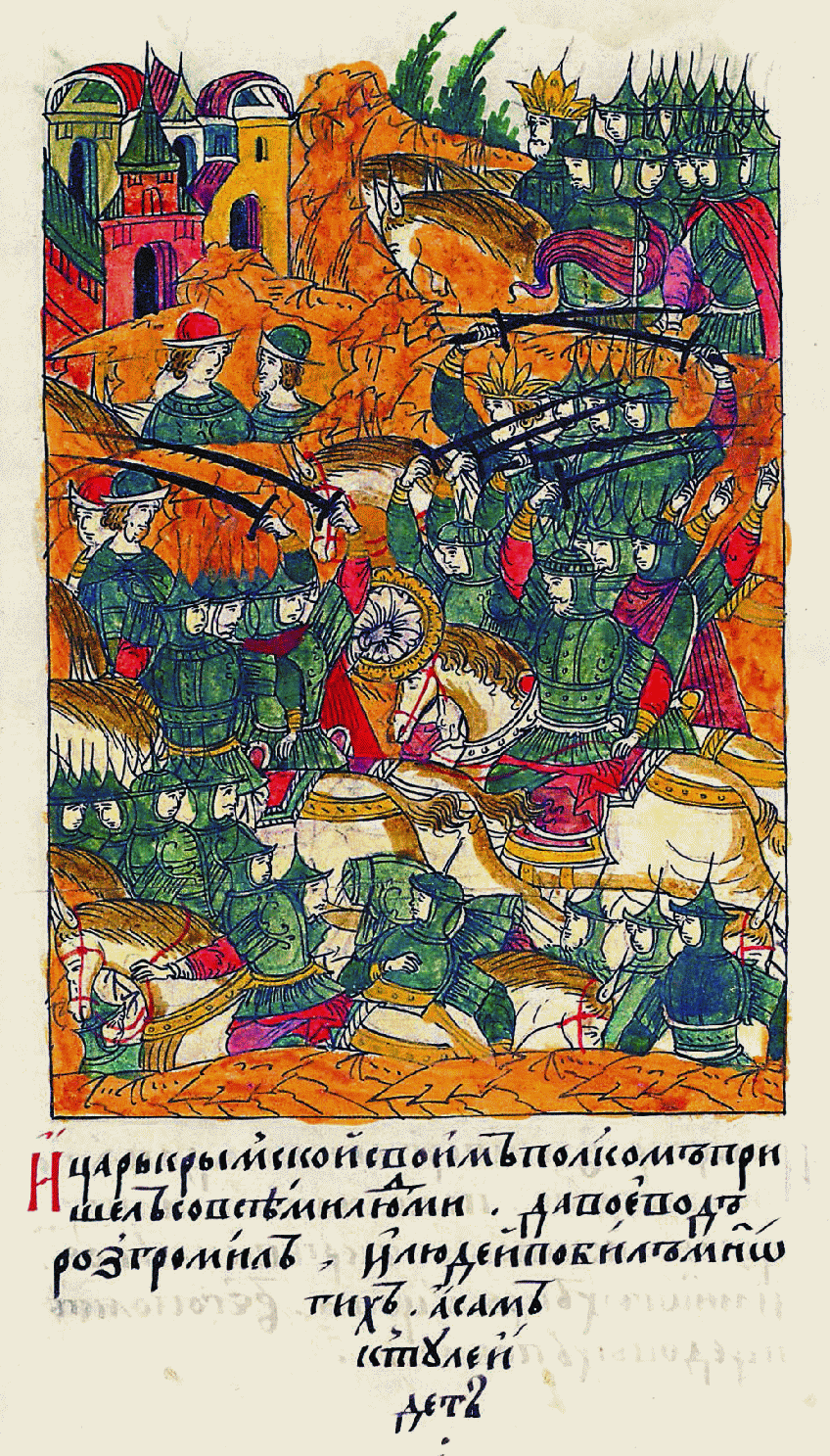
- Miniature of the Illustrated Chronicle, 16th century
Date	24 May 1571
Location	Moscow, Tsardom of Russia 55°47′N 37°40′E
Result	Crimean victory
Territorial changes	Most of Moscow destroyed by fire

Belligerents
Crimean Khanate	Tsardom of Russia

Commanders and leaders
Devlet I Giray; Divey-Murza (Note: "The experienced military commander Divey-Murza was chief counsellor of Devlet I Giray")	Ivan the Terrible (AWOL); Ivan Belsky †; Ivan Mstislavsky; Ivan Sheremetev; Mikhail Vorotynsky; Pyotr Tatev; Vasily Temkin-Rostovsky

Strength
less than 40,000 Tatar horsemen (Note: Chronicler Balthasar Russow's data Probably borrowed from other Livonians Johann Taube and Elert Kruse.); Unknown number of Nogais and Besleney Circassians (Note: Historian Ruslan Skrynnikov's commentary)	36,000–40,000 (Note: The anonymous German author of the brochure "Brief reliable news and general review of the past stories and deeds that happened in last time in 1570 and 1571 in Moscow and in Russia" wrote about 40,000 Russian troops. Devlet I Giray himself in his dispatch to Istanbul reported that under Moscow's walls he was met by a Russian army of 30,000 selected horsemen and 6,000 infantrymen.)

Casualties and losses
Unknown	Crimean ambassador in Warsaw claim: approx. 60,000 killed; another 60,000 enslaved; Giles Fletcher claim: approx. 800,000 killed (likely exaggerated); Modern estimates: 200,000+, incl. citizenry: 10,000–120,000 dead; 60,000–150,000 enslaved
- Location within European Russia

The Fire of Moscow occurred on 24 May 1571, when a Crimean army led by the khan of Crimea Devlet I Giray together with its allied tribal contingents bypassed the Serpukhov defensive fortifications on the Oka River, crossed the Ugra River into the Moscow suburbs, and rounded the flank of the 36,000–40,000 men of the Russian army.

== Prelude ==
The Russian sentry troops were crushed by the Crimean and Ottoman forces. Not having sufficient forces to stop the invasion, the Russian army retreated to Moscow. The rural Russian population also fled to the capital. After defeating the Russian army, the Crimean forces besieged the town of Moscow, because in 1556 and 1558, Muscovy, violating the oath given to the Giray dynasty, attacked the lands of the Crimean Khanate. Muscovite troops invaded Crimea and burned villages and towns in Western and Eastern Crimea, with many Crimean Tatars captured or killed. In 1561, the Muscovites "received a letter from the Patriarch of Constantinople" (which turned out to be false), asserting the rights of Ivan the Terrible to claim himself the Tsar. By 1563, relations between the Muscovy and the Crimean Khanate finally deteriorated.

By 23 May 1571, Tatar troops approached Moscow, setting up a camp near Kolomenskoye. At the same time, Russian voivodes entered the city. The army of Ivan Belsky stood on Bolshaya Street, and the regiment of Ivan Mstislavsky and Ivan Sheremetev on Yakimanka. The advanced regiment of Mikhail Vorotynsky and Pyotr Tatev stood on the Tagansky meadow, while the army of Vasily Tiomkin-Rostovsky was behind Neglinnaya. According to chroniclers, "Prince Ivan Dmitrievich Belskoy went against the Crimean people across the Moskva River to the meadow behind the Swamp and did business with them." During the battle, the Crimeans pushed back the Russians, Prince Belsky was wounded, and a fire rapidly spread through the city.

== Fire ==
The Crimean Tatar forces set the suburbs on fire on 24 May and a sudden wind blew the flames into Moscow and the city went up in a conflagration. According to Heinrich von Staden, a German in the service of Ivan the Terrible (he claimed to be a member of the Oprichnina), "the city, the palace, the Oprichnina palace, and the suburbs burned down completely in six hours. It was a great disaster because no one could escape." People fled into stone churches to escape the flames, but the stone churches collapsed (either from the intensity of the fire or the pressure of the crowds.) People also jumped into the Moscow River to escape, where many drowned. The powder magazine of the Kremlin exploded and those hiding in the cellar there asphyxiated. The Tsar ordered the dead found on the streets to be thrown into the river, which overflowed its banks and flooded parts of the town. Jerome Horsey wrote that it took more than a year to clear away all the bodies.

== Aftermath ==
The march on Moscow was the most destructive Crimean Tatar invasion of Russia since the invasion of 1521. Scholars argue that the fire in 1571 was even more widespread than the great fire of Moscow in 1547. The aftermath of the raid was so catastrophic that it was said that there were no remaining poles in the city to tie a horse to. Determining the exact number of casualties and captives during the Devlet Giray campaign is challenging. Different sources provide varying estimates, ranging from 60,000 to 150,000 individuals enslaved and from ten thousand to a hundred and twenty thousand people killed in the attack on Moscow. The Crimean ambassador in Warsaw claimed that 60,000 individuals lost their lives during the campaign, while an equal number were captured. In contrast, Giles Fletcher believed that the death toll reached a staggering 800,000 people. Although this figure is clearly exaggerated, it cannot be denied that Russia suffered immense losses. The extensive destruction of Moscow is further confirmed by the papal legate Antonio Possevino who reported a population of no more than 30,000 individuals in 1580. This is in contrast to the 41,500 houses and at least 100,000 inhabitants that Moscow had in 1520.

Though the battle of Moscow inflicted large losses on the Russian military, the troops did not face defeat. Their wagons were nearly completely destroyed by fire on the streets of Moscow. Many horses were lost and the field artillery suffered damage. Despite these challenges, the number of troops recruited from local cavalry, which relied on the support of serving cities, did not much decrease, as evident from the campaign of 1572.

The fire affected both the domestic and foreign policy decisions made by Ivan the Terrible. The inability of the Oprichniks to protect the capital highlighted the necessity of disbanding the Oprichnina. The Oprichny Palace, which had been reduced to ashes, was not reconstructed, and some influential oprichniks were executed. Following the devastating incidents, the authorities in Moscow contemplated the construction of a stone barrier encompassing Bely Gorod, designed to render it impervious to the onslaught of the Tatar cavalry. During the early 1590s, the government of Boris Godunov, the brother-in-law of the Tsar, took the initiative to construct a structure known as the Belgorod Wall.

The campaign launched against Moscow influenced the foreign policy dynamics of the Russian state, resulting in a transformation in its international relations. Ivan the Terrible faced challenges in addition to his difficult relationships with the Crimean Khanate and the Ottoman Empire. He was also forced to make compromises and concessions in negotiations with other states. In 1571, he consented to the extension of trade privileges for merchants from England.

The following year, the Crimeans, with Ottoman support, attempted another raid on Moscow, but this time they were defeated at the Battle of Molodi.

== Sources ==
- Kondratiev, Ivan Kuzmich (1999). Sedaya starina Moskvy Седая старина Москвы [The hoary antiquity of Moscow] (in Russian) (2nd ed.). Moscow: Tsitadel. ISBN 5-7657-0080-2.
- Penskoy, Vitaly Viktorovich (2012). Ivan Grozny i Devlet Girey Иван Грозный и Девлет Гирей [Ivan the Terrible and Devlet Giray] (in Russian). Moscow: Veche. ISBN 978-5-9533-6428-7.
- Penskoy, V. V.; Penskaya, T. M. (2013). "'Yaz dei deda svoyego i pradeda nyne zdelal lutchi…': Pokhod Devlet-Gireya I i sozhzheniye Moskvy v maye 1571 g." "Яз деи деда своего и прадеда ныне зделал лутчи...": Поход Девлет-Гирея I и сожжение Москвы в мае 1571 г. ["They say I have now done it better than my grandfather and great-grandfather…": The campaign of Devlet-Giray I and the burning of Moscow in May 1571]. Istoriya voyennogo dela: issledovaniya i istochniki (in Russian) (4): 183–226. ISSN 2308-4286.
- Shokarev, Sergey Yurievich (2012). Povsednevnaya zhizn' srednevekovoy Moskvy Повседневная жизнь средневековой Москвы [Everyday life in medieval Moscow] (in Russian). Moscow: Molodaya Gvardiya. ISBN 978-5-235-03540-9.
- Zimin, Aleksandr (2001). Oprichnina Опричнина (in Russian). ISBN 5-900829-07-3.
