= Tsardom of Russia =

Russian state from 1547 to 1721

Tsardom of Russia Русское царство
- 1547–1721
- Flag (1693–1721) Coat of arms (1667–1703)

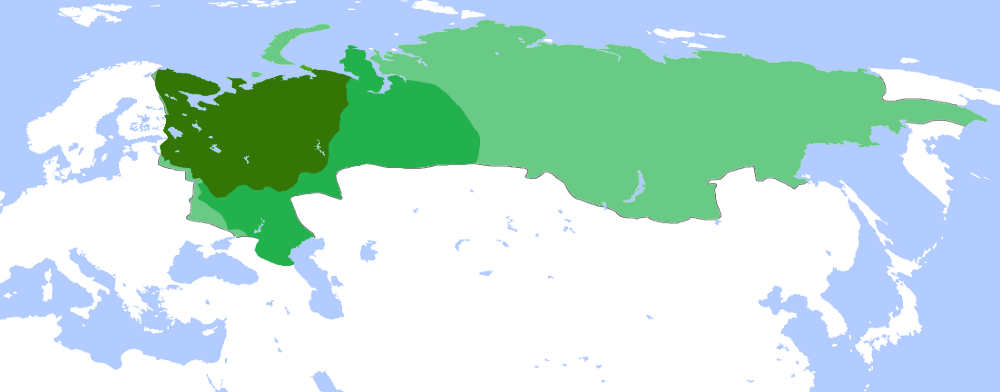
- Territory of Russia in 1500 1600 and 1700
- Capital: Moscow (1547–1712); Saint Petersburg (1712–1721)
- Official languages: Russian (Middle Russian)
- Religion: Russian Orthodoxy (official)
- Demonym: Russian
- Government: Absolute monarchy
- Tsar
  - 1547–1584: Ivan IV (first)
  - 1682–1721: Peter I (last)
- Legislature: Boyar Duma (1547–1549; 1684–1711); Zemsky Sobor (1549–1684); Governing Senate (1711–1721)
- Historical era: Early modern period
  - Coronation of Ivan IV: 16 January 1547
  - Livonian War: 1558–1583
  - Time of Troubles: 1598–1613
  - Russo-Polish War: 1654–1667
  - Great Northern War: 1700–1721
  - Treaty of Nystad: 10 September 1721
  - Empire proclaimed: 2 November 1721

Population
  - 1500: 6 million
  - 1600: 12 million
  - 1646: 14 million
  - 1719: 15.7 million
- Currency: Ruble
| Preceded by | Succeeded by |
| Grand Principality of Moscow | Russian Empire |

The Tsardom of Russia, (Note: Russian: Русское царство, romanized: Russkoye tsarstvo.) also known as the Tsardom of Moscow, (Note: Russian: Московское царство, romanized: Moskovskoye tsarstvo.) was the centralized Russian state from the assumption of the title of tsar by Ivan IV in 1547 until the foundation of the Russian Empire by Peter the Great in 1721. It is generally regarded as the first phase of Tsarist Russia.

From 1550 to 1700, Russia grew by an average of 35,000 square kilometres (14,000 sq mi) per year. The period includes the upheavals of the transition from the Rurik to the Romanov dynasties, wars with the Polish–Lithuanian Commonwealth, Sweden, and the Ottoman Empire, and the Russian conquest of Siberia, to the reign of Peter the Great, who took power in 1689 and transformed the tsardom into an empire. During the Great Northern War, he implemented substantial reforms and proclaimed the Russian Empire after victory over Sweden in 1721.

== Name ==
While the oldest endonyms of the Grand Principality of Moscow used in its documents were "Rus'" (Русь) and the "Russian land" (Русская земля, Russkaya zemlya), a form of its name in Russian that became common by the 15th century. The vernacular Rus' was transformed into Rus(s)iya or Ros(s)iya (based on the Greek name for Rus'). In the 1480s, Russian state scribes Ivan Cherny and Mikhail Medovartsev mention Russia under the name "Росиа" (Rosia), and Medovartsev also mentions the sceptre "of Russian lordship" (Росийскаго господства, Rosiyskago gospodstva). In the following century, the new forms co-existed with Rus' and appear in an inscription on the western portal of the Transfiguration Cathedral of the Spaso-Preobrazhensky Monastery in Yaroslavl (1515), on the icon case of the Theotokos of Vladimir (1514), in the work by Maximus the Greek, the Russian Chronograph written by Dosifei Toporkov in 1516–1522, and in other sources.

On 16 January 1547, Ivan IV was crowned the tsar and grand prince of all Russia (Царь и Великий князь всея Руси, Tsar i Velikiy knyaz vseya Rusi), thereby proclaiming the Tsardom of Russia, or "the Great Russian Tsardom", as it was called in the coronation document, by Constantinople Patriarch Jeremiah II, and in numerous official texts. The formula in manuscripts "to all his state of Great Russia" later replaced those found in other manuscripts – "to all the Russian realm" (vo vse Rossisskoe tsarstvo); the former is more typical of the 17th century, when the usage of the term "Great Russia" (Velikaya Rossiya) became widely established. By the 17th century, the form Rossiya replaced Rus' to describe the extent of the tsar's imperial authority in chiny, with Feodor III using the term "Great Russian Tsardom" (Velikorossisskoe tsarstvie) to denote an imperial and absolutist state, subordinating both Russian and non-Russian territories. The old name Rus' was replaced in official documents, though the names Rus' and Russian land were still common and synonymous to it.

The Russian state partly remained referred to as Moscovia (English: Muscovy) throughout Europe, predominantly in its Catholic part, though this Latin term was never used in Russia. The two names Russia and Moscovia appear to have co-existed as interchangeable during the late 16th century and throughout the 17th century with different Western maps and sources using different names, so that the country was called "Russia, or Moscovia" (Latin: Russia seu Moscovia) or "Russia, popularly known as Moscovia" (Latin: Russia vulgo Moscovia). In England it was known both as Russia and Muscovy. Such notable Englishmen as Giles Fletcher, author of the book Of the Russe Common Wealth (1591), and Samuel Collins, author of The Present State of Russia (1668), both of whom visited Russia, were familiar with the term Russia and used it in their works. So did numerous other authors, including John Milton, who wrote A brief history of Moscovia and of other less-known countries lying eastward of Russia, published posthumously, starting it with the words: "The Empire of Moscovia, or as others call it, Russia...".

According to prominent historians like Alexander Zimin and Anna Khoroshkevich, the continuous use of the term Moscovia was a result of traditional habit and the need to distinguish between the Muscovite and the Lithuanian part of Rus', as well as of the political interests of the Polish–Lithuanian Commonwealth, which competed with Moscow for the western regions of Rus'. Due to the propaganda of the Commonwealth, as well as of the Jesuits, the term Moscovia was used instead of Russia in many parts of Europe where prior to the reign of Peter the Great there was a lack of direct knowledge of the country. In Northern Europe and at the court of the Holy Roman Empire, however, the country was known under its own name, Russia or Rossia. Sigismund von Herberstein, ambassador of the Holy Roman Emperor in Russia, uses both Russia and Moscovia in his work on the Russian tsardom and notes "The majority believes that Russia is a changed name of Roxolania. Muscovites ("Russians" in the German version) refute this, saying that their country was originally called Russia (Rosseia)". Pointing to the difference between Latin and Russian names, French captain Jacques Margeret, who served in Russia and left a detailed description of L'Empire de Russie of the early 17th century that was presented to King Henry IV, states that foreigners make "a mistake when they call them Muscovites and not Russians. When they are asked what nation they are, they respond 'Russac', which means 'Russians', and when they are asked what place they are from, the answer is Moscow, Vologda, Ryasan and other cities". The closest analogue of Moscovia in Russia is "Tsardom of Moscow", or "Moscow Tsardom" (Московское царство, Moskovskoye tsarstvo), which was used along with the name "Russia", sometimes in one sentence, as in the name of the 17th-century Russian work On the Great and Glorious Russian Moscow State (О великом и славном Российском Московском государстве, O velikom i slavnom Rossiyskom Moskovskom gosudarstve).

== History ==
=== Byzantine heritage ===
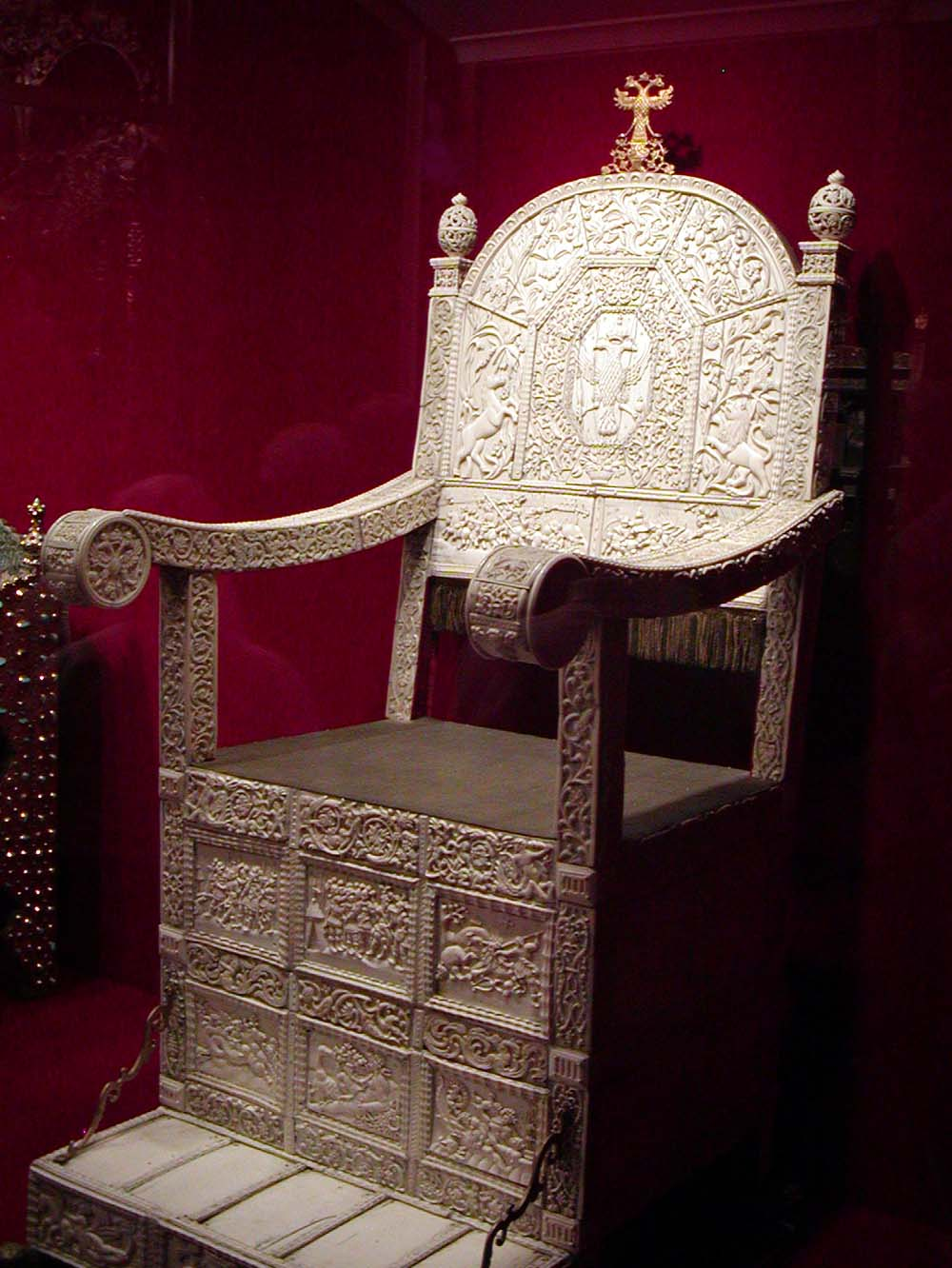
Ivory throne of Ivan IV of Russia

By the 16th century, the Russian ruler had emerged as a powerful, autocratic figure, a tsar. By assuming that title, the sovereign of Moscow suggested that he was a major ruler on a par with the Byzantine emperor. Tsar (царь) represents the Slavic adaptation of the Roman Imperial title/name Caesar) Indeed, after Ivan III married Sophia Palaiologina, the niece of the late Byzantine Emperor Constantine XI Palaiologos, in 1472, the Moscow court adopted Byzantine terms, rituals, titles, and emblems such as the double-headed eagle, which survives in the coat of arms of Russia. The Byzantine Empire was ready to be succeeded since it had been conquered by the Ottoman Empire in 1453.

At first, the Byzantine term autokrator expressed only the literal meaning of an independent ruler, but in the reign of Ivan IV (1533–1584) it came to imply unlimited (autocratic) rule. In 1547 the Grand Duke Ivan IV was crowned tsar and thus was recognized – at least by the Russian Orthodox Church – as emperor. Notably, the hegumen Philotheus of Pskov claimed in 1510 that after Constantinople fell to the Ottoman Empire, the Russian tsar remained the only legitimate Orthodox ruler and that Moscow was the Third Rome, becoming the final lineal successor to Rome and Constantinople; these were the two centers of Christianity and of the Western and Eastern Roman empires of earlier periods. The "Third Rome" concept would resonate in the self-image of the Russian people in future centuries.

=== Early reign of Ivan IV ===
The development of the tsar's autocratic powers reached a peak during the reign of Ivan IV, and he gained the sobriquet "Grozny". The English word terrible is usually used to translate the Russian word grozny in Ivan's nickname, but this is a somewhat archaic translation. The Russian word grozny reflects the older English usage of terrible as in "inspiring fear or terror; dangerous; powerful; formidable". It does not convey the more modern connotations of English terrible, such as "defective" or "evil". Vladimir Dal defines grozny specifically in archaic usage and as an epithet for tsars: "Courageous, magnificent, magisterial and keeping enemies in fear, but people in obedience". Other translations have also been suggested by modern scholars.

Ivan IV became Grand Prince of Moscow in 1533 at age three. The Shuysky and Belsky factions of the boyars competed for control of the regency until Ivan assumed the throne in 1547. Reflecting Moscow's imperial claims, Ivan's coronation as tsar was a ritual modeled after those of the Byzantine emperors. With the continuing assistance of a group of boyars, Ivan began his reign with a series of useful reforms. In the 1550s, he declared a new law code, revamped the military, and reorganized local government. These reforms undoubtedly were intended to strengthen the state in the face of continuous warfare.

=== Foreign policies of Ivan IV ===
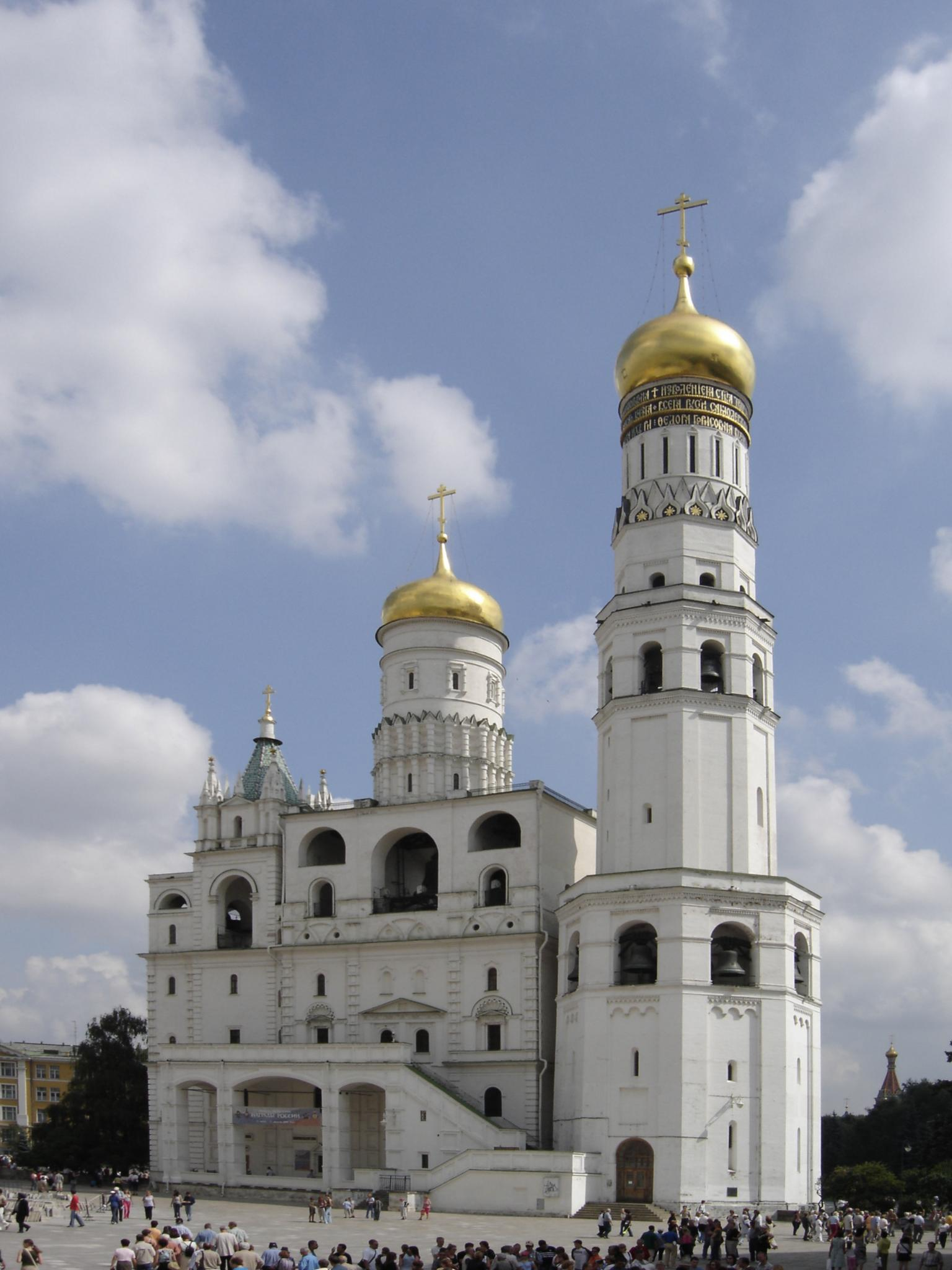
Ivan the Great Bell Tower, raised to the present height during the reign of Boris Godunov

Muscovy remained a fairly unknown society in Western Europe until Baron Sigismund von Herberstein published his Rerum Moscoviticarum Commentarii (literally Notes on Muscovite Affairs) in 1549. This provided a broad view of what had been a rarely visited and poorly reported state. In the 1630s, the Russian tsardom was visited by Adam Olearius, whose lively and well-informed writings were translated into all the major languages of Europe.

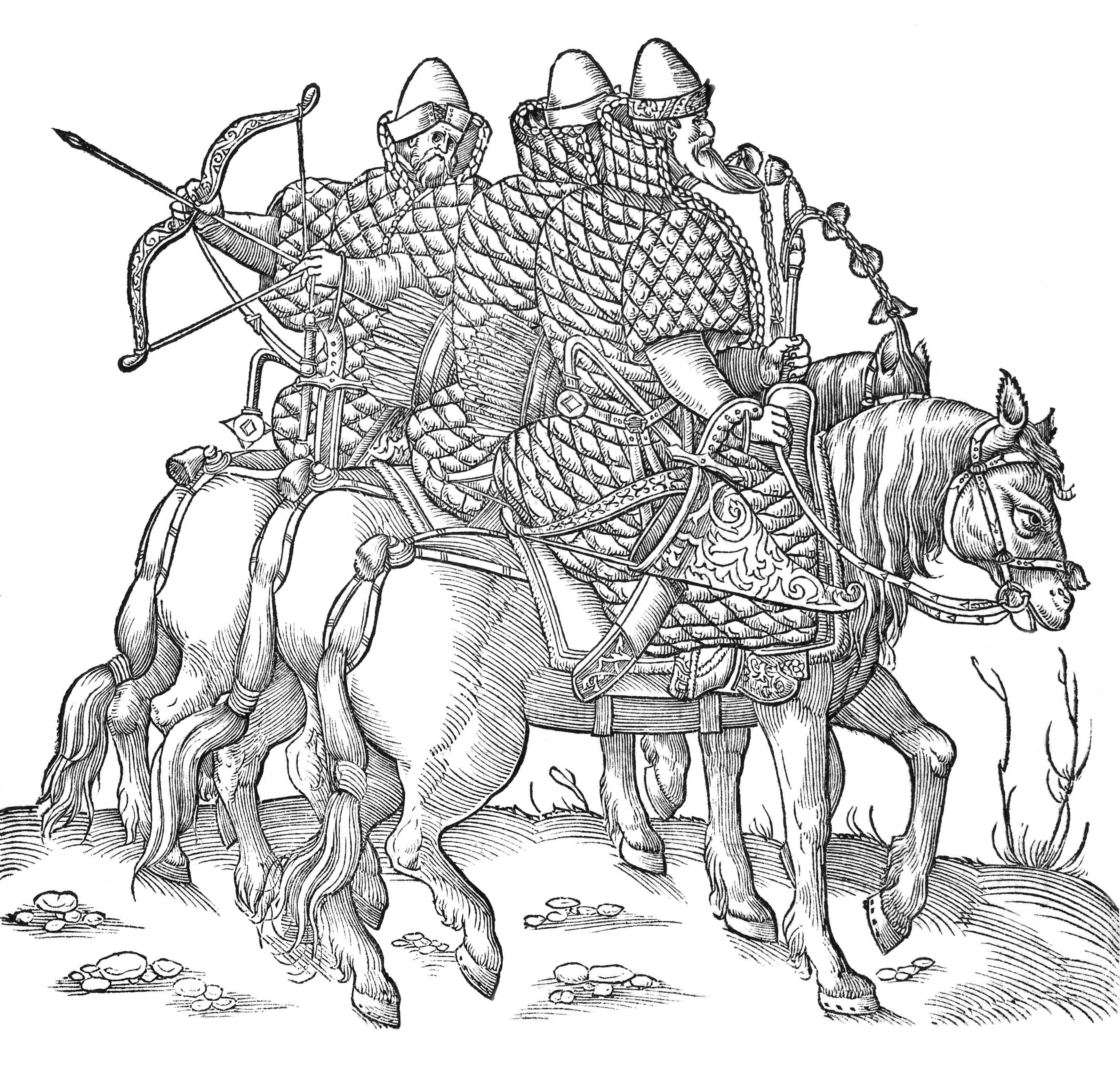
Mounted archers of Muscovy

Further information about Russia was circulated by English and Dutch merchants. Richard Chancellor sailed to the White Sea in 1553 and continued overland to Moscow. Upon his return to England, the Muscovy Company was formed by Chancellor, Sebastian Cabot, Sir Hugh Willoughby, and several London merchants. Ivan IV used these merchants to exchange letters with Elizabeth I.

Despite the domestic turmoil of the 1530s and 1540s, Russia continued to wage wars and to expand. It grew from 2.8 to 5.4 million square kilometers from 1533 to 1584. Ivan defeated and annexed the Khanate of Kazan on the middle Volga in 1552 and later the Astrakhan Khanate in 1556, where the Volga meets the Caspian Sea. An east–west line of fortifications was continuously pushed southward from the 1550s. This had the effect of making the Nogai Horde the main adversary of Moscow in the Pontic–Caspian steppe. A network of fortresses by Moscow was established to fortify the Kama basin and the Kazan heartland. The tsar controlled the entire Volga River and gained access to Central Asia, transforming Russia into a multiethnic and multiconfessional state, which continues today.

Expanding to the northwest toward the Baltic Sea proved to be much more difficult. In 1558, Ivan invaded Livonia, eventually involving himself in a 25-year war against the Polish–Lithuanian Commonwealth, Sweden, and Denmark. Despite first successes, Ivan's army was pushed back, and the nation failed to secure a coveted position on the Baltic Sea.

Hoping to make profit from Russia's concentration on Livonian affairs, Devlet I Giray of Crimea, accompanied by as many as 120,000 horsemen, repeatedly devastated the Moscow region until the Battle of Molodi put a stop to such northward incursions. But for decades to come, the southern borderland was annually pillaged by the Nogai Horde and the Crimean Khanate, who took local inhabitants with them as slaves. Tens of thousands of soldiers protected the Great Abatis Belt – a burden for a state whose social and economic development was stagnating.

=== Late reign of Ivan IV and oprichnina ===
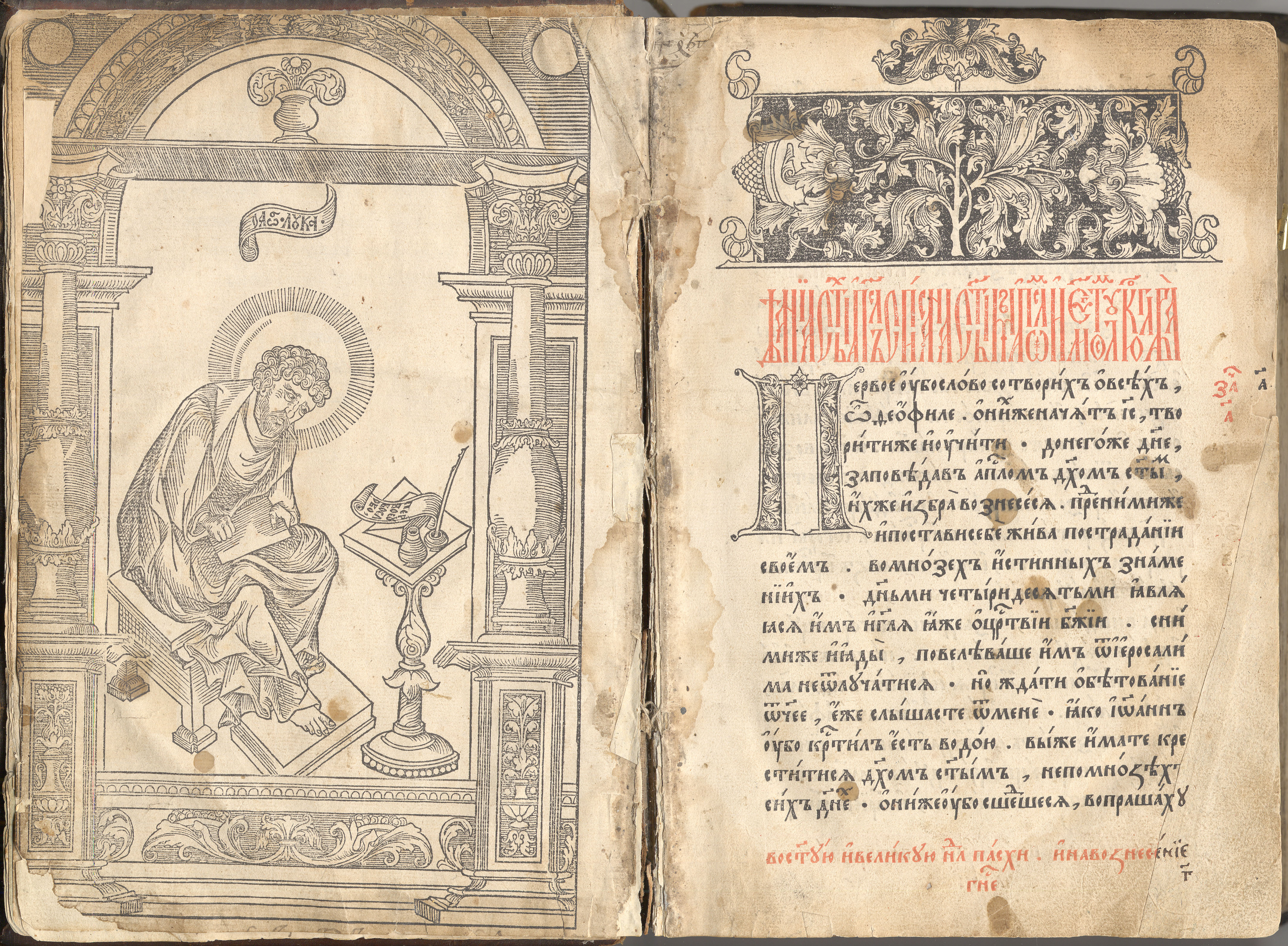
The Apostle (1564) by Ivan Fyodorov and Pyotr Mstislavets, one of the first Russian printed books

During the late 1550s, Ivan developed a hostility toward his advisers, the government, and the boyars. Historians have not determined whether policy differences, personal animosities, or mental imbalance caused his wrath. In 1565, he divided Russia into two parts: his private domain (or oprichnina) and the public realm (or zemshchina). For his private domain, Ivan chose some of the most prosperous and important districts of Russia. In these areas, Ivan's agents attacked boyars, merchants, and even common people, summarily executing some and confiscating land and possessions. Thus began a decade of terror in Russia that culminated in the 1570 Massacre of Novgorod.

As a result of the policies of the oprichnina, Ivan broke the economic and political power of the leading boyar families, thereby destroying those who had built up Russia and were the most capable of administering it. Trade diminished, and peasants faced with mounting taxes and threats of violence began to leave Russia. Efforts to curtail the mobility of the peasants by tying them to their land brought Russia closer to legal serfdom. In 1572, Ivan abandoned the practices of the oprichnina. Ivan's domestic and foreign policies had a devastating effect on Russia.

=== Time of Troubles ===
Ivan IV was succeeded by his son Feodor, who was uninterested in ruling and possibly mentally deficient. Actual power went to Feodor's brother-in-law, the boyar Boris Godunov (who is credited with abolishing Yuri's Day, the only time of the year when serfs were free to move from one landowner to another). Perhaps the most important event of Feodor's reign was the proclamation of the Patriarchate of Moscow in 1589. The creation of the patriarchate climaxed the evolution of a separate and independent Russian Orthodox Church.

In 1598, Feodor died without an heir, ending the Rurik dynasty. Godunov then convened a Zemsky Sobor, a national assembly of boyars, church officials, and commoners, which proclaimed him tsar, although various boyar factions refused to recognize the decision. Widespread crop failures caused the Russian famine of 1601–1603, and during the ensuing discontent, a man emerged who claimed to be Tsarevich Demetrius, Ivan IV's son who had died in 1591. This pretender to the throne, who came to be known as False Dmitriy I, gained support in Poland and marched to Moscow, gathering followers among the boyars and other elements as he went. Historians speculate that Godunov would have weathered this crisis had he not died in 1605. As a result, False Dmitriy I entered Moscow and was crowned tsar that year, following the murder of Tsar Feodor II, Godunov's son.

Subsequently, Russia entered a period of continuous chaos, known as The Time of Troubles (Смутное Время). Despite the tsar's persecution of the boyars, the townspeople's dissatisfaction, and the gradual enserfment of the peasantry, efforts at restricting the power of the tsar were only halfhearted. Finding no institutional alternative to the autocracy, discontented Russians rallied behind various pretenders to the throne. During that period, the goal of political activity was to gain influence over the sitting autocrat or to place one's own candidate on the throne. The boyars fought among themselves, the lower classes revolted blindly, and foreign armies occupied the Kremlin in Moscow, prompting many to accept tsarist autocracy as a necessary means to restoring order and unity in Russia.

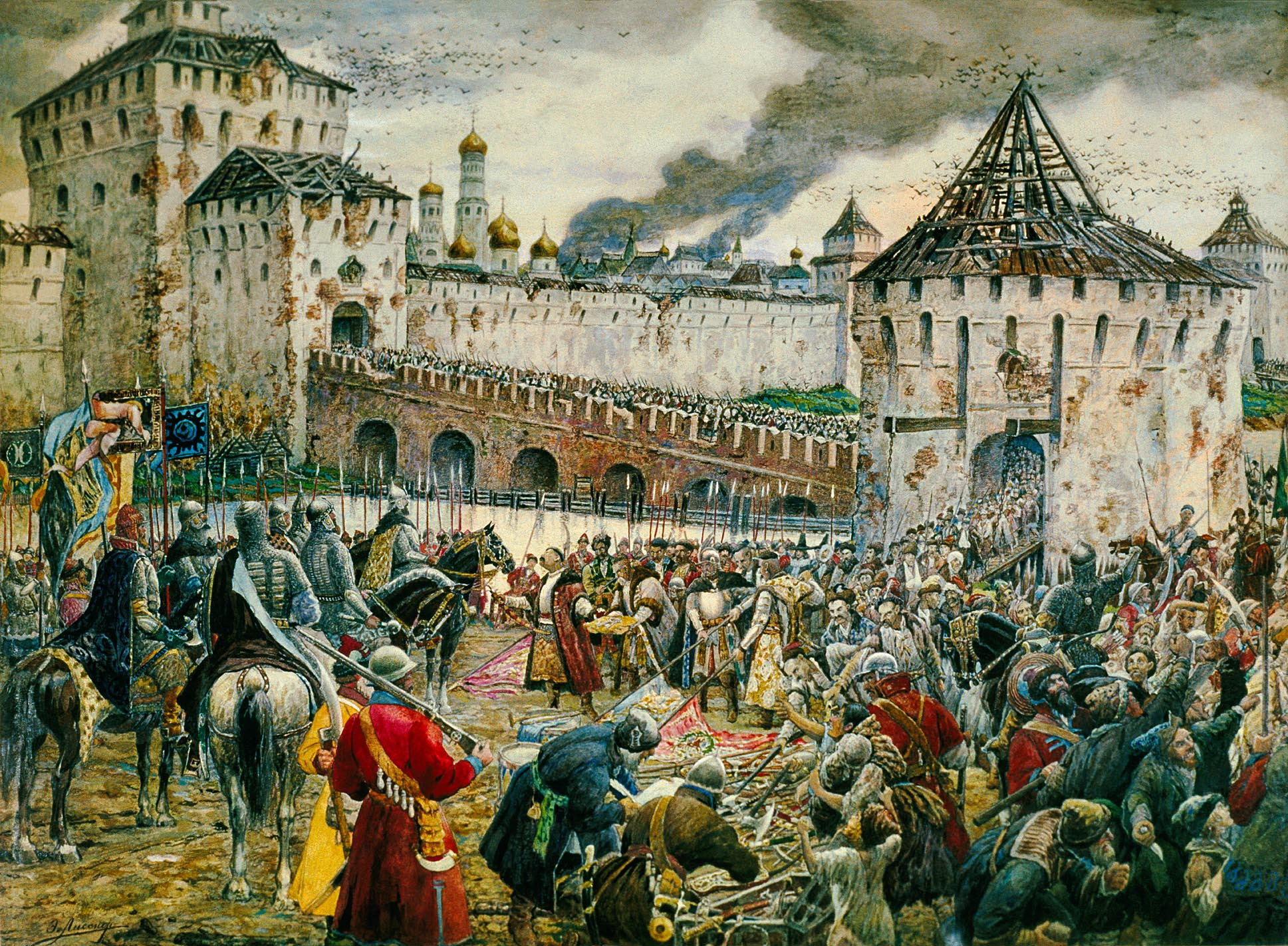
The Poles surrender the Moscow Kremlin to Prince Pozharsky in 1612. Painting by Ernst Lissner.

The Time of Troubles included a civil war in which a struggle over the throne was complicated by the machinations of rival boyar factions, the intervention of regional powers Poland and Sweden, and intense popular discontent, led by Ivan Bolotnikov. False Dmitriy I and his Polish garrison were overthrown, and boyar Vasily Shuysky was proclaimed tsar in 1606. In his attempt to retain the throne, Shuysky allied himself with the Swedes, unleashing the Ingrian War with Sweden. False Dmitry II, allied with the Poles, appeared under the walls of Moscow and set up a mock court in the village of Tushino.

In 1609, Poland and Lithuania intervened into Russian affairs officially, captured Vasili IV of Russia and his family, and occupied the Kremlin. A group of Russian boyars signed in 1610 a treaty of peace, recognising Władysław IV Vasa, son of the Polish King and Lithuanian Grand Duke Sigismund III Vasa, as tsar. In 1611, False Dmitry III appeared in the Swedish-occupied territories but was apprehended and executed. The Polish–Lithuanian presence led to a patriotic revival among the Russians, and a volunteer army, financed by the Stroganov merchants and blessed by the Orthodox Church, was formed in Nizhny Novgorod and (led by Prince Dmitry Pozharsky and Kuzma Minin) drove the Poles and Lithuanians out of the Kremlin. In 1613, a zemsky Sobor proclaimed the boyar Mikhail Romanov as tsar, beginning the 300-year reign of the Romanov family.

=== Romanovs ===
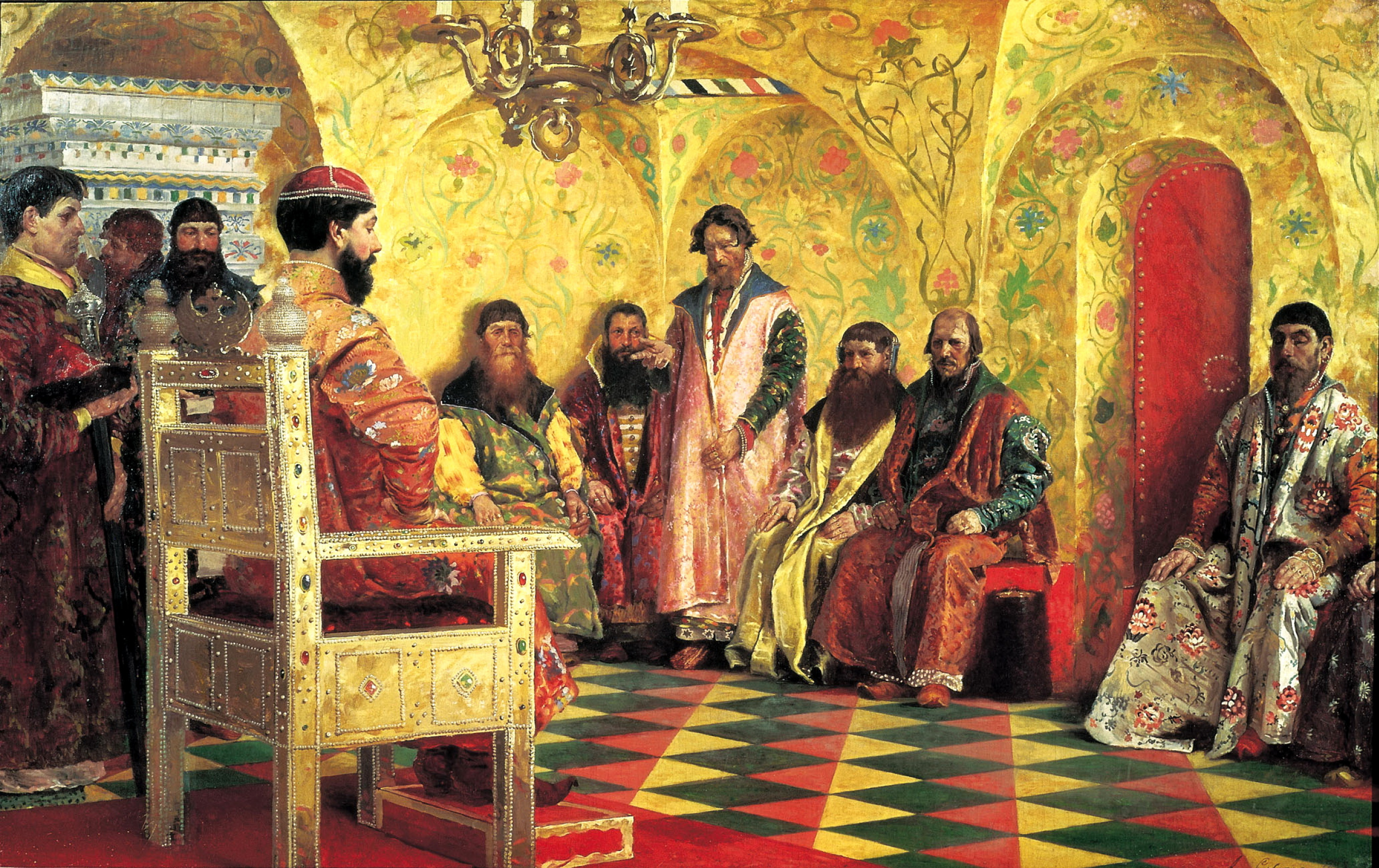
Andrei Ryabushkin: Tsar Michael at the Session of the Boyar Duma (1893)

The immediate task of Romanov was to restore order. However, Russia's major enemies, Poland and Sweden, were engaged in a conflict with each other, which provided Russia with the opportunity to make peace with Sweden in 1617. The Polish–Muscovite War was ended with the Truce of Deulino in 1618, restoring temporarily Polish and Lithuanian rule over some territories, including Smolensk, lost by the Grand Duchy of Lithuania in 1509.

The early Romanovs were weak rulers. Under Mikhail, state affairs were in the hands of the tsar's father, Filaret, who in 1619 became patriarch of Moscow. Later, Mikhail's son Aleksey (r. 1645–1676) relied on boyar Boris Morozov to run his government. Morozov abused his position by exploiting the populace, and in 1648 Aleksey dismissed him in the wake of the Salt Riot in Moscow.

After an unsuccessful attempt to regain Smolensk from Poland in 1632, Russia made peace with Poland in 1634. Polish king Władysław IV Vasa, who had been elected by Russian boyars as tsar of Russia during the Time of Troubles, renounced all claims to the title as a condition of the peace treaty.

=== Legal code of 1649 ===
The autocracy survived the Time of Troubles and the rule of weak or corrupt tsars because of the strength of the government's central bureaucracy. Government functionaries continued to serve, regardless of the ruler's legitimacy or the boyar faction controlling the throne. In the 17th century, the bureaucracy expanded dramatically. The number of government departments (prikazy; sing., prikaz ) increased from 22 in 1613 to 80 by mid-century. Although the departments often had overlapping and conflicting jurisdictions, the central government, through provincial governors, was able to control and regulate all social groups, as well as trade, manufacturing, and even the Eastern Orthodox Church.

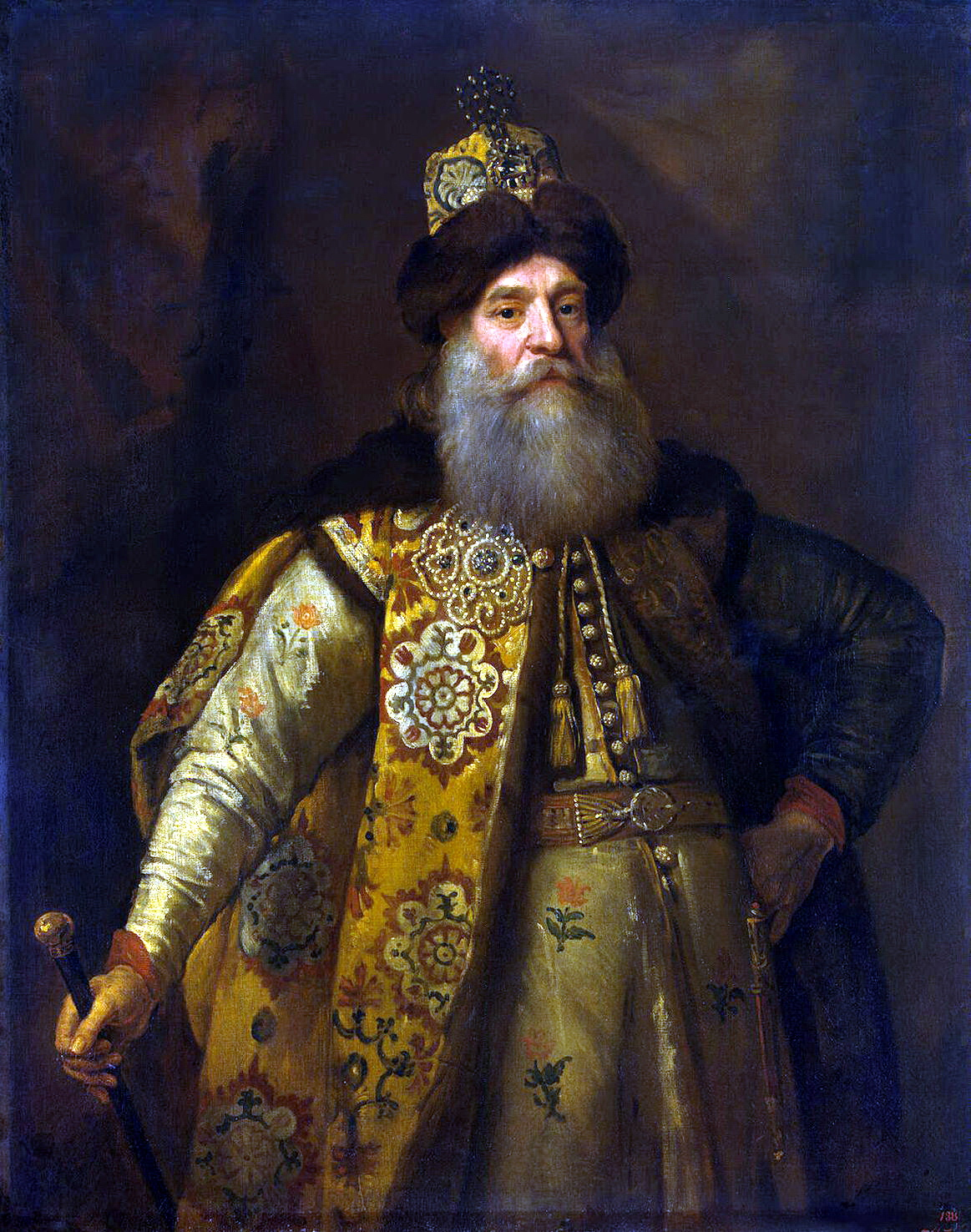
Portrait of Russian diplomat and voivode Pyotr Potemkin by Godfrey Kneller

The Sobornoye Ulozheniye, a comprehensive legal code introduced in 1649, illustrates the extent of state control over Russian society. By that time, the boyars had largely merged with the new elite, who were obligatory servitors of the state, to form a new nobility, the dvoryanstvo. The state required service from both the old and the new nobility, primarily in the military because of permanent warfare on southern and western borders and attacks of nomads. In return, the nobility received land and peasants. In the preceding century, the state had gradually curtailed peasants' rights to move from one landlord to another; the 1649 code officially attached peasants to their home.

The state fully sanctioned serfdom, and runaway peasants became state fugitives. Landlords had complete power over their peasants. Peasants living on state-owned land, however, were not considered serfs. They were organized into communes, which were responsible for taxes and other obligations. Like serfs, however, state peasants were attached to the land they farmed. Middle-class urban tradesmen and craftsmen were assessed taxes, and, like the serfs, they were forbidden to change residence. All segments of the population were subject to military levy and to special taxes. By restricting much of Russian society to specific domiciles, the legal code of 1649 curtailed movement and subordinated the people to the interests of the state.

Under this code, increased state taxes and regulations altered the social discontent that had been simmering since the Time of Troubles. In the 1650s and 1660s, the number of peasant escapes increased dramatically. A favourite refuge was the Don River region, domain of the Don Cossacks. A major uprising occurred in the Volga region in 1670 and 1671. Stenka Razin, a Cossack who was from the Don River region, led a revolt that drew together wealthy Cossacks who were well established in the region and escaped serfs seeking free land. The unexpected uprising swept up the Volga River valley and even threatened Moscow. Tsarist troops finally defeated the rebels after they had occupied major cities along the Volga in an operation whose panache captured the imaginations of later generations of Russians. Razin was publicly tortured and executed.

=== Acquisition of the Wild Fields ===
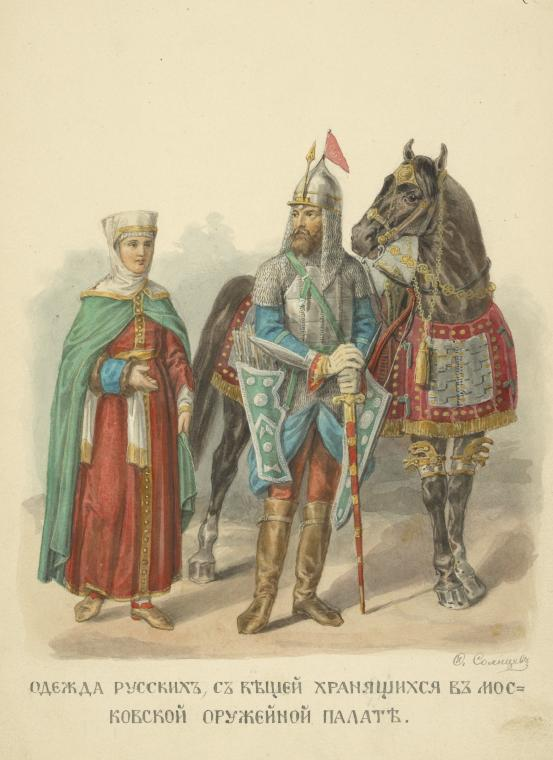
A warrior of the Russian noble cavalry (поместная конница) during the Russo-Polish War of 1654–1667. The drawing is based on the pieces preserved in the Kremlin Armoury.

The Tsardom of Russia continued its territorial growth through the 17th century. In the southwest, it claimed the Wild Fields (modern day Eastern Ukraine and South-Western Russia), which had been under Polish–Lithuanian rule and sought assistance from Russia to leave the rule of the Commonwealth. The Zaporozhian Cossacks, warriors organized in military formations, lived in the frontier areas bordering Poland, the Crimean Tatar lands. Although part of them was serving in the Polish army as Registered Cossacks, the Zaporozhian Cossacks remained fiercely independent and staged several rebellions against the Poles. In 1648, the peasants of what is now Eastern Ukraine joined the Cossacks in rebellion during the Khmelnytsky Uprising, because of the social and religious oppression they suffered under Polish rule. Initially, Cossacks were allied with Crimean Tatars, which had helped them to throw off Polish rule. Once the Poles convinced the Tartars to switch sides, the Zaporozhian Cossacks needed military help to maintain their position.

In 1648, the Hetman (leader) of the Zaporozhian Host, Bohdan Khmelnytsky, offered to ally with the Russian tsar, Aleksey I. Aleksey's acceptance of this offer, which was ratified in the Treaty of Pereyaslav in 1654, led to a protracted war between Poland and Russia. The Truce of Andrusovo, which did not involve the Hetmanate (Cossack Hetmanate) as a participating party of the agreement ended the war in 1667. Cossacks considered it as a Moscow betrayal. As a result, it split Cossack territory along the Dnieper River, reuniting the western sector (or Right-bank Ukraine) with Poland and leaving the eastern sector (Left-bank Ukraine) self-governing under the sovereignty of the tsar. However, the self-government did not last long and Cossack territory was eventually incorporated into the Russian Empire (after the Battle of Poltava) during the 18th century.

=== Raskol (Schism) ===
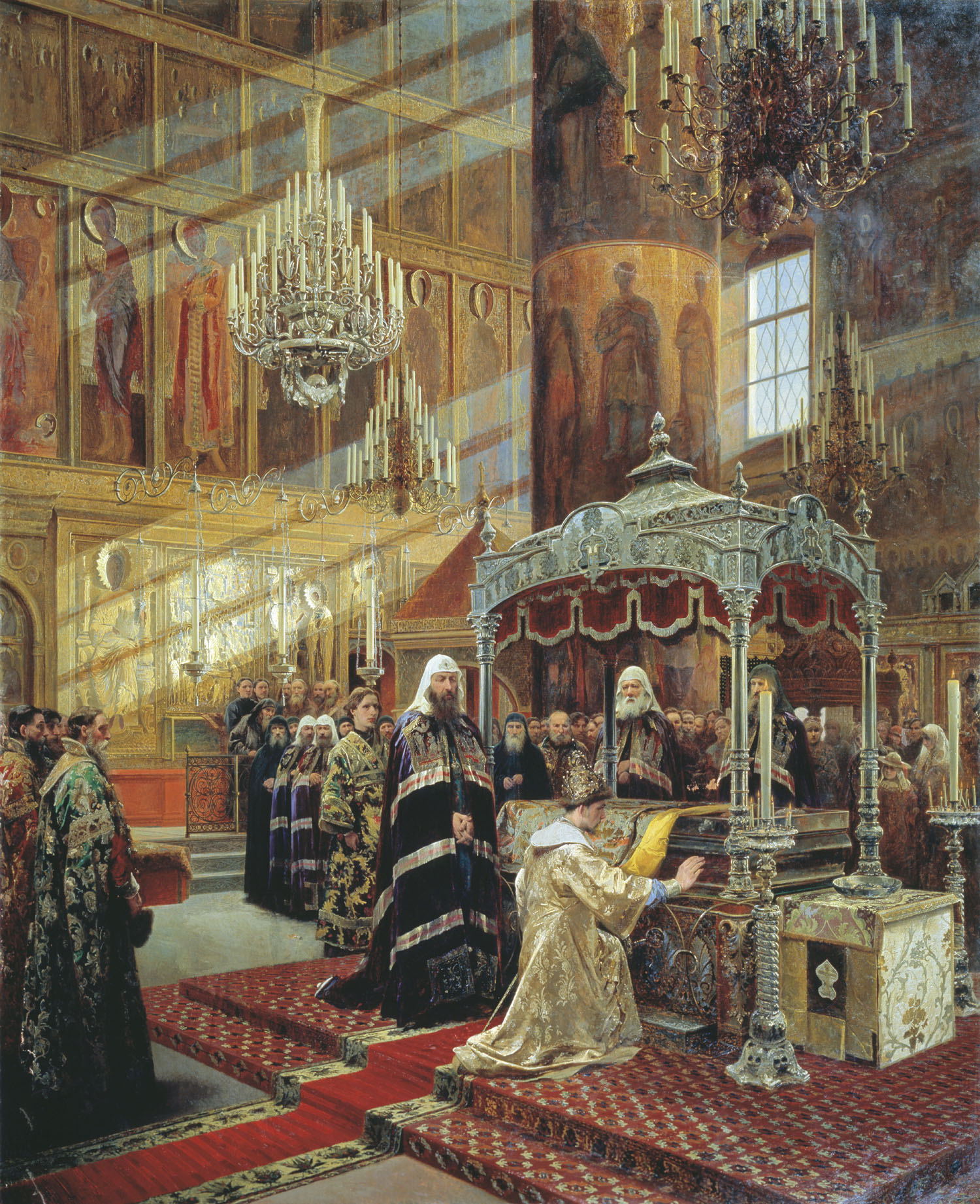
Patriarch Nikon and Tsar Alexis in the Cathedral of the Archangel. Painting by Alexander Litovchenko.

Russia's southwestern expansion, particularly its incorporation of the Wild Fields (modern day Eastern Ukraine), had unintended consequences. Most Little Russians were Orthodox, but their close contact with the Roman Catholic Polish also brought them Western intellectual currents. Through the Cossack Academy in Kiev, Russia gained links to Polish and Central European influences and to the wider Orthodox world. Although the Zaporozhian Cossack link induced creativity in many areas, it also weakened traditional Russian religious practices and culture. The Russian Orthodox Church discovered that its isolation from Constantinople had caused variations to appear between their liturgical books and practices.

The Russian Orthodox patriarch, Nikon, was determined to bring the Russian texts back into conformity with the Greek texts and practices of the time. But Nikon encountered opposition among the many Russians who viewed the corrections as improper foreign intrusions. When the Orthodox Church forced Nikon's reforms, a schism resulted in 1667. Those who did not accept the reforms came to be called the Old Believers; they were officially pronounced heretics and were persecuted by the church and the state. The chief opposition figure, the protopope Avvakum, was burned at the stake. The split afterwards became permanent, and many merchants and peasants joined the Old Believers.

The tsar's court also felt the impact of Little Russia and the West. Kiev was a major transmitter of new ideas and insight through the famed scholarly academy that Metropolitan Mohyla founded there in 1631. Other more direct channels to the West opened as international trade increased and more foreigners came to Russia. The Tsar's court was interested in the West's more advanced technology, particularly when military applications were involved. By the end of the 17th century, Little Russian, Polish, and West European penetration had weakened the Russian cultural synthesis – at least among the elite – and had prepared the way for another transformation.

=== Conquest of Siberia ===
Vasily Surikov: Yermak's Conquest of Siberia (1895)

Russia's eastward expansion encountered little resistance from the indigenous peoples of the region of Siberia. In 1581, the Stroganov merchant family, interested in the fur trade, hired a Cossack leader, Yermak Timofeyevich, to lead an expedition into western Siberia. Yermak defeated the Khanate of Sibir and claimed the territories west of the Ob and Irtysh Rivers for Russia.

From such bases as Mangazeya, merchants, traders, and explorers pushed eastward from the Ob River to the Yenisei, then on to the Lena River and the coast of the Pacific Ocean. In 1648, Cossack Semyon Dezhnyov opened the passage between America and Asia. By the middle of the 17th century, Russians had reached the Amur River and the outskirts of the Chinese Empire.

After a period of Sino-Russian border conflicts with the ruling Qing dynasty, Russia made peace with China in 1689. By the Treaty of Nerchinsk, Russia ceded its claims to the Amur Valley, but it gained access to the region east of Lake Baikal and the trade route to Beijing. Peace with China strengthened the initial breakthrough to the Pacific Ocean that had been made in the middle of the century.

Furthermore, the Russians experienced numerous border raids and invasions from the Oirats and the Dzungars causing the Dzungar–Russian conflicts between the two polities. The border of Russia and the Dzungar Khanate was eventually established from the Irtysh to the Yenisei.

=== Peter the Great and the Russian Empire ===
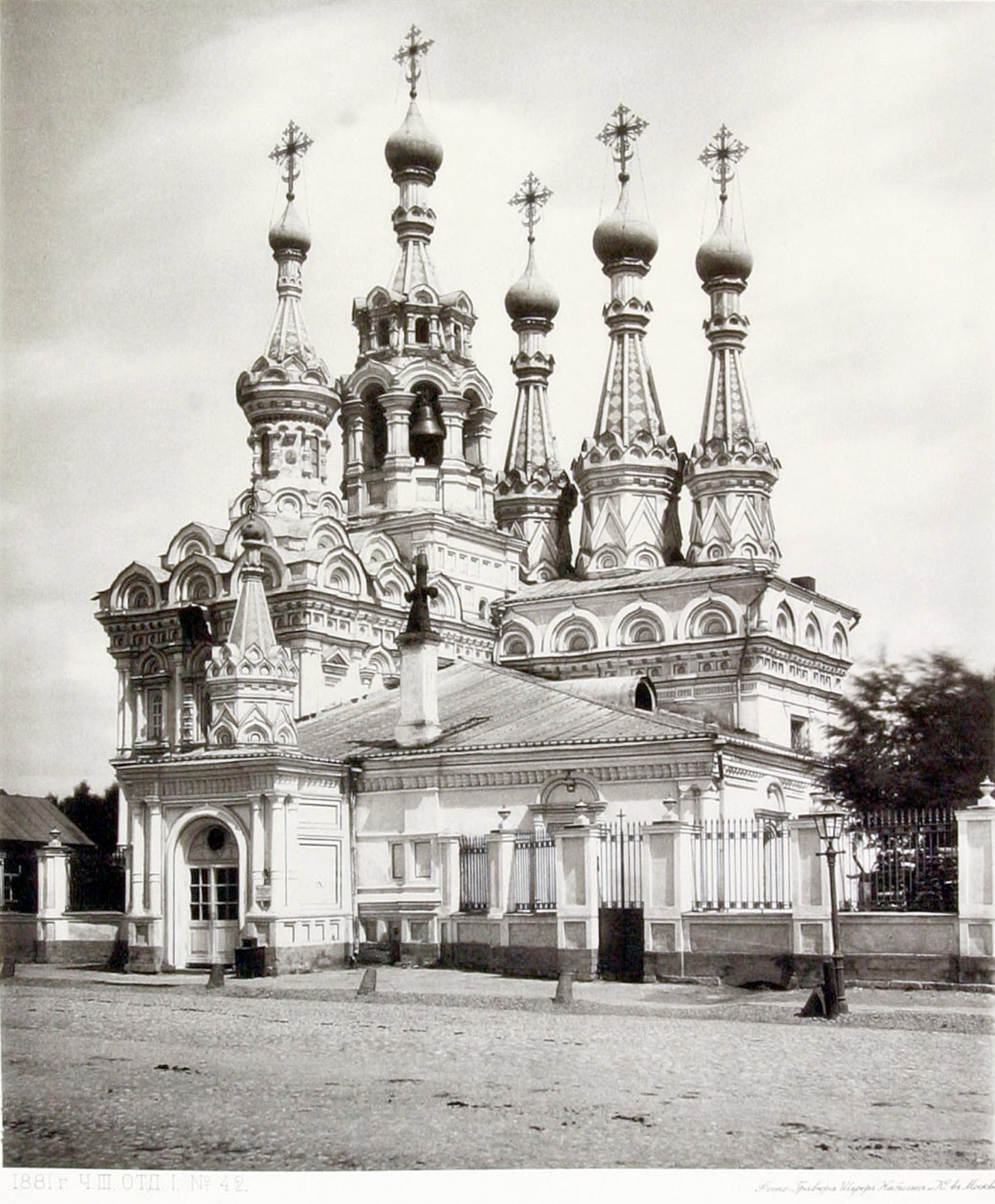
Nativity Church at Putinki, an example of the 17th-century Russian uzorochye style

Peter the Great (1672–1725), who became ruler in his own right in 1696, brought the Tsardom of Russia, which had little prior contact with Western Europe, into the mainstream of European culture and politics. After suppressing numerous rebellions with considerable bloodshed, Peter embarked on an incognito tour of Western Europe. He became impressed with what he saw and was awakened. Peter began requiring the nobility to wear Western European clothing and shave off their beards, an action that the boyars protested bitterly. Arranged marriages among the nobility were banned, and the Orthodox Church was brought under state control. His administrative reforms, creating a Governing Senate in 1711, the Collegium in 1717 and the Table of Ranks in 1722 had a lasting impact on Russia.

These changes did not win Peter many friends, and in fact caused great political division in the country. These, along with his notorious cruelties (such as the torture murder of his own son for plotting a rebellion) and the immense human suffering that accompanied many of his projects, such as the construction of Saint Petersburg, led many pious Russians to believe that he was the Antichrist. The Great Northern War against Sweden consumed much of Peter's attention for years; however, the Swedes were eventually defeated, and peace was agreed to in 1721. Russia annexed the Baltic coast from Sweden and parts of Finland, which would become the site of the new Russian capital, Saint Petersburg. The Russian victory in the Great Northern War marked a watershed in European politics, as it not only brought about the eclipse of Sweden as a great power, but also Russia's decisive emergence as a permanent European great power. The Russian conquest of Siberia also continued, and war with Persia brought about the acquisition of territory in the Caucasus, although Russia returned those gains after Peter's death in 1725 as an alliance between Russia and Persia was established.

== Organization ==
- Mestnichestvo
- Pososhniye lyudi
- Sloboda
- Ukase
- Votchina

Bureaucratic titles

- Prikaz
- Podyachy
- Dyak

== State flags ==
There was no single flag during the Tsardom. Instead, there were multiple flags:

- Standards used by the Tsar:
  - Standard of the Tsar of Russia (1693–1700): white-blue-red tricolor with golden double-headed eagle in the center. Replaced by the Imperial standard in 1700 (see below).
  - Imperial Standard of the Tsar of Russia: black double-headed eagle carrying St. Vladimir Red Coat of Arms, on a golden rectangular field, adopted in 1700 instead of the older white-blue-red Standard of the Tsar of Moscow.
- Civil flag: The early Romanov Tsars instituted the two-headed eagle Imperial Flag of the Tsar, which origin dates back to 1472, as a Civil Flag, it remained the Civil Flag of Russia until replaced during the Empire in 1858.
- Civil ensign of Russia: the white-blue-red tricolor, that was adopted on 20 January 1705 by decree of Peter I.
- Naval ensign of the Imperial Russian Navy: white field with a blue saltire, adopted in 1712. Before that, the naval ensign of Russia was white-blue-red tricolor.
- Naval jack of the Imperial Russian Navy: red field with a blue saltire, adopted in 1700.
Naval ensign of the Imperial Russian Navy (1697–1699) and civil ensign of Russia (from 1705)

Naval ensign of the Imperial Russian Navy (1699–1700), a transitional variant between the 1697–1699 ensign and the Andreevsky Flag of 1712

Naval jack of the Imperial Russian Navy (from 1700)

Naval ensign of the Imperial Russian Navy (from 1712)

Standard of the Tsar of Russia (1693–1700)

== See also ==
- List of Russian monarchs
- Coronation of the Russian monarch
- Tsarist autocracy
- Demographic history of Russia

== Primary sources ==
- Grigory Kotoshikhin's Russia during the reign of Alexey Mikhailovich (1665) is the indispensable source for those studying administration of the Russian tsardom
- Domostroy is a 16th-century set of rules regulating everyday behaviour in the Russian boyar families.

== Secondary sources ==
- – Russia
- Jarmo Kotilaine, Marshall Poe (ed.), Modernizing Muscovy: Reform and Social Change in Seventeenth Century Russia, Routledge, 2004, ISBN 0-415-30751-1
