= Zemshchina =

Political term in 16th-century Russia

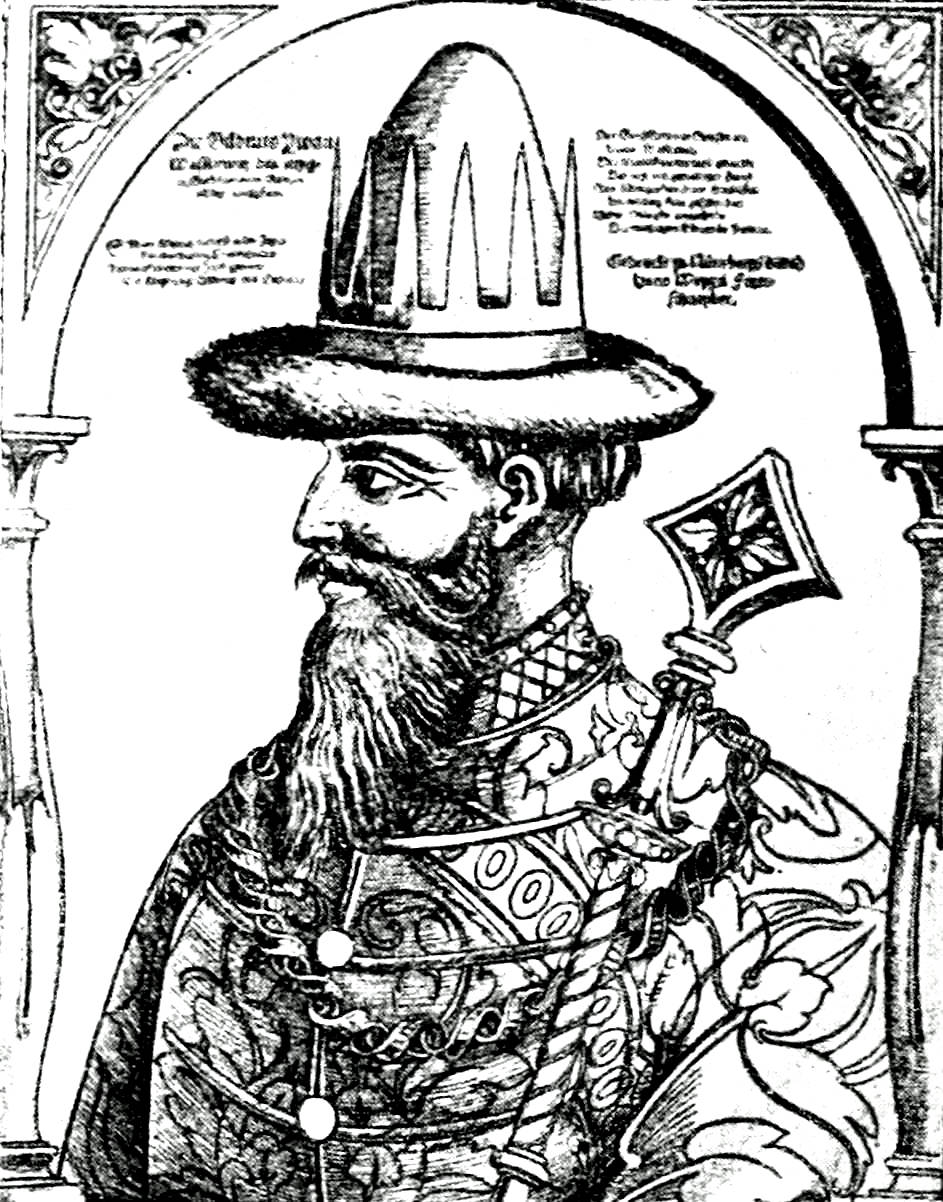
Ivan the Terrible

Zemshchina was in the classical sense, according to the definition of the archaeographer Vasily Storozhev, "land, as a concept opposite to the state, to everything state and sovereign in ancient Russia".

This term received special meaning in the 16th century, after the departure of Tsar Ivan the Terrible to the Alexandrovskaya Sloboda in December 1564. Returning to the kingdom through an intensified petition of clergy and boyars, Tsar Ivan IV Vasilyevich established the oprichnina and, having become its head, separated for her from the land "outside her" people and income; all that was not included in this oprichnina was a zemshchina, headed by its zemshchina boyars and even a special zemshchina king (Simeon Bekbulatovich, in 1574).

The division into the oprichnina and zemshchina continued even after the exile of Tsar Simeon to Tver, only the oprichnina was replaced by the word court, so that towns and governors of zemshchina were opposed by cities and governors of the court, and zemshchina – by the court.

Those whom Ivan the Terrible did not want to see as part of the oprichnik court were forcefully evicted on the territory of the zemshchina.

The zemshchina was ruled by the Zemsky Boyar Duma and territorial orders (Order of the Grand Palace, Armor Order, Zemsky Order, Stable Order, Local Order, Rank Order, Ambassadorial Order, etc.).

When the oprichnina was established, the zemshchina was to pay its head 100 thousand rubles for a trip to the Alexandrovskaya Sloboda (a huge sum for those times).

Zemshchina even had its own separate zemshchina regiments.

The center of the zemshchina was the city of Moscow.

In 1572, the oprichnina was abolished and the zemshchina lands merged with the oprichnina lands, but in the fall of 1575 the zemshchina revived again when the tsar retired to the "shire", leaving Khan Simeon Bekbulatovich, who was granted the title of "Grand Duke of All Russia", on the throne.

With the death of Ivan the Terrible and the dissolution of a special court, the zemshchina also disappeared.

== List of cities and lands included in the zemshchina ==
Velikiye Luki, Vladimir, Vyatka Land, Gorodets, Dmitrov, Pechora Region with Pustozerye, Perm, Nizhny Novgorod, Starodub Ryapolovsky (Starodub-on-Klyazma), Murom, Kolomna, Pronsk, Ryazan, Tula, Serpukhov, Obolensk, Odoev, Novosil, Bryansk, Smolensk, Tver, Torzhok, Kashin, Uglich, Vodskaya, Shelonskaya and Derevskaya pyatinas of Novgorod Land, Sofiyskaya side of the city of Novgorod, Pskov, Izborsk, Ivangorod, Koporye.

Until February 1567, the city of Kostroma was considered a zemshchina.

Until the end of 1567, the lands of Borovsky Uyezd and Staritsa belonged to the zemshchina.

Until 1569, Belozero (now Belozersk) was part of the zemshchina.

Until the beginning of 1569, it included the cities of Rostov, Poshekhonye and Yaroslavl, after which they were assigned to the oprichnina.

Until the end of February 1571, the Bezhetskaya and Obonezhskaya pyatinas of Novgorod Land and the Trade side of Novgorod were also included in the zemshchina.

The city of Moscow also was included in the zemshchina (with the exception of a number of urban areas ranked as an oprichnina: the left side of the Nikitskaya street "to the open area"; Chertolskaya street "to the open area"; Arbat street to the Dorogomilovsky area; three metropolitan settlements).

== Sources ==
- "Russian Humanitarian Encyclopedic Dictionary". Moscow: VLADOS Publishing House: Faculty of Philology, Saint Petersburg State University, 2002
