= Massacre of Novgorod =

1570 attack by the oprichniki

- Part of the oprichnina
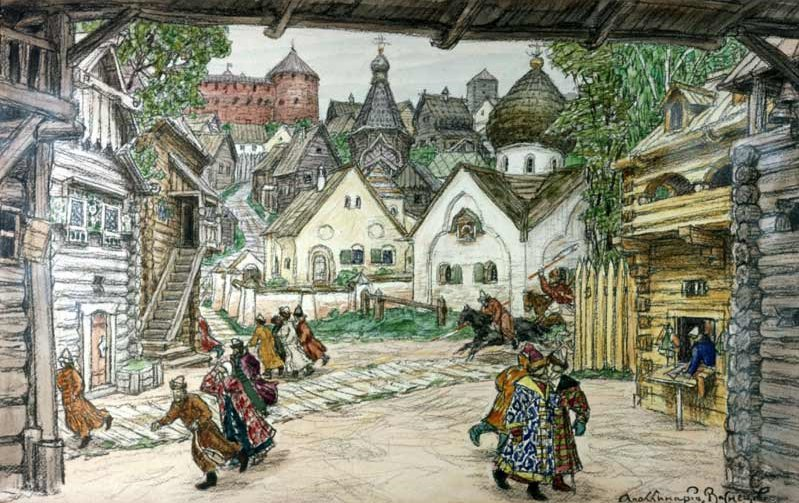
- Apollinary Vasnetsov's 1911 painting "The street in the town": people fleeing at the arrival of the Oprichniki (inspired by the opera The Oprichnik by Tchaikovsky)
- Location: Novgorod, Russia
- Date: 2 January – 12 February 1570
- Attack type: State terrorism, Massacre
- Deaths: 2,000–15,000
- Perpetrators: Ivan the Terrible and the oprichniki
- Motive: Paranoid allegations of treason

The massacre of Novgorod (Russian: Новгородский погром, romanized: Novgorodsky pogrom) was an attack launched by Ivan the Terrible's oprichniki on the city of Novgorod, Russia, in 1570. Although initially an act of vengeance against the perceived treason of the local Orthodox church, the massacre quickly became possibly the most vicious in the brutal legacy of the oprichnina, with casualties estimated between two thousand and fifteen thousand and innumerable acts of extreme, violent cruelty. In the aftermath of the attack, Novgorod lost its status as one of Russia's leading cities, crippled by decimation of its citizenry combined with Ivan's assault on the surrounding farmlands.

== Origins and rationale ==
=== Paranoia, power, and the oprichnina ===
The late 1560s under Ivan the Terrible were rife with conspiracies and violence. Ivan's mental state was continually deteriorating and was exacerbated by his wars with Sweden, Lithuania, and Poland. Ivan's deep distrust of the boyars, a sentiment held from childhood, coupled with his paranoia and need for control, led him to create the oprichnina in 1565.

The oprichniki were essentially a private army under Ivan's personal control with the power to "pronounce official disgrace upon, execute and confiscate the property of disobedient boyars without the advice of the [boyar] council." Ivan proceeded to exercise this right liberally, as he attempted to purge all those whom he deemed a threat.

=== Treason at Izborsk ===
One year before the carnage, in 1569, the tsar evicted several thousand from Novgorod and the neighboring town of Pskov in an attempt to avoid a betrayal like the one in Izborsk. He also began to execute anyone he deemed a threat; for example, in 1568, over 150 boyar council members and noblemen (along with their households in some cases) in Moscow were killed in response to real or imagined conspiracies, as well as anyone who protested against the oprichnina.

The suspicious circumstances surrounding the loss of Izborsk (despite the fact that Ivan managed to recover the town), along with growing unrest among the aristocrats in Moscow, convinced Ivan that treason was widespread and expanding, prompting him to take murderous action against those he viewed as the largest threats, his cousin, Prince Vladimir Andreyevich, and the city of Novgorod.

=== Rumors and doubts ===
Shortly after the executions of Prince Vladimir and most of his family, Ivan launched an attack on Novgorod, claiming treason and treachery. It is probably not a coincidence that Novgorod still housed a number of the late Vladimir's supporters and retainers.

==== Defection to Poland–Lithuania ====
Though the reasoning behind the attack was generally kept secret, there were rumors of a conspiracy among the boyars of the city, aided by the Archbishop of Novgorod, Bishop Pimen, to surrender the city to the king of the Polish–Lithuanian commonwealth.

There is much speculation about the authenticity of the evidence behind the rumors (a document of questionable origin) considering that relations between Pimen and Ivan were relatively amicable.

One theory was that Peter, the man who informed Ivan of the document's existence and location, had been punished by the people of Novgorod and composed the document in revenge, forging the signatures of the archbishop and other important citizens. It is also possible that Polish agents planted the documents in an attempt to unseat or at least destabilize Ivan.

There is little to no concrete evidence to suggest that Novgorod actually planned to defect to Poland–Lithuania. Novgorod's planned defection (as well as its alleged plan to convert en masse to the Roman Catholic Church) had been used as part of the justification of Ivan III of Russia for taking direct control of the city in 1478, and it seems that Ivan IV copied his paternal grandfather on this and several other occasions – fighting the same battle twice.

== Ivan in Novgorod ==
=== Initial attack ===
In the summer of 1569, Ivan and the oprichnina council decided to march on Novgorod that December to exact revenge for the alleged treasonous behavior. Ivan's force started from Alexandrov Village, where he resided and ruled from December 1564 to February 1565, when he had fled Moscow before the creation of the oprichnina. They moved from Klin at the beginning of the Tver district, sweeping westward through Tver and other centers, then all the way to Novgorod, plundering and terrorizing each population, laying waste to everything in their path.

On 2 January 1570, the advance regiment of the tsar's armies arrived on the outskirts of the city, four days before the tsar. They were to construct a barrier around the city, trapping the inhabitants. The regiment also attacked the monasteries surrounding the city, looting the treasuries and beating and/or imprisoning the clergy.

=== Confrontation with Archbishop Pimen ===
On 6 January, the tsar arrived with his son Ivan, his court, and roughly 1,500 musketeers in tow. Ivan stopped just before entering the city, in the trading quarter of Gorodische, to set up his camp and royal court, issuing his initial orders from there. On the second day (7 January), the clergy members, the father superiors and monks, who had been arrested by the advance regiment, were to be beaten to death and their bodies returned to the monasteries to be buried.

On 8 January, Ivan proceeded into Novgorod and was met on the bridge over the Volkhov River, as was customary, by the Archbishop Pimen. In line with tradition and ceremony, the archbishop attempted to bless the tsar, but Ivan refused, accusing Pimen (and with him, all of Novgorod) of treason and of conspiring to turn the city over to Poland–Lithuania. Ivan refused to approach the cross that came with the welcoming procession, stating to the archbishop:

You reprobate! You are not holding the life-giving cross but a weapon, a weapon you would use to wound our heart. You and your accomplices, the people of this city, wish to turn over our patrimony, this great and blessed Novgorod, to a foreigner, to the Lithuanian King Sigmund Augustus. Henceforth you are not a pastor, not a teacher, but a wolf, a destroyer, a traitor, the torment of our purple mantle and our crown!

Despite his reproof of the archbishop, Ivan still demanded that he be taken to the Saint Sophia Cathedral for divine liturgy. Ivan's piety and the fact that he was not entirely mentally sound led him to demand that the clergy say liturgy amid the general confusion and disorder caused by the entrance of the tsar and his armed retinue. Afterward, Ivan's company dined with Pimen, though that too was interrupted by chaos. Shortly after the meal began, Ivan shouted orders to his assembled guard to arrest Pimen and to plunder his residence, treasury, and court. The prelate was publicly insulted and mocked by the tsar, who paraded him around the city on a mare while facing backwards and accompanied by skomorokhi (Russian folk minstrels, outlawed by the Russian Orthodox Church as a hold-over from paganism). He was then arrested and imprisoned while Ivan sacked the city.

=== Attack on the Church ===
==== Under the advance regiment ====
Ivan's first commands from Gorodishche concerned the immediate subjugation and humiliation of the church. He ordered that his regiment confiscate the treasuries of the outlying monasteries, as well as begin the brutality of the trials at Gorodishche. Initially, around 500 father superiors and monks from the outlying churches (the same clergymen that he would order beaten to death two days later), were rounded up, taken into Novgorod and flogged. The priests and deacons of the churches inside the city were to be arrested and turned over to the bailiffs to be held in shackles and flogged from dawn until dusk unless or until they could pay a ransom of 20 rubles each.

==== Looting ====
===== St. Sophia Cathedral =====
Following the arrest of the archbishop and his subsequent imprisonment, Ivan's soldiers set about stripping the cathedrals and churches of all of their valuables. They stripped the St. Sophia cathedral, making off with valuable ornaments and icons as well as the ancient Korsun gate from the altar.

===== Suburban monasteries =====
Though the trials held by the tsar's court at Gorodishche were drawing to a close, the assault on the city persisted. Ivan began to tour prominent monasteries in the suburbs of the city, supervising the oprichniki as they continued to loot the monastic treasuries. When Ivan began his sweeps of the surrounding churches, about two to four weeks later, his men set out to finish the job they started before the tsar's arrival.

'Every day he mounted and moved to another monastery, where he indulged his savagery.' His men took money, ransacked cells, tore down bells, destroyed equipment, and slaughtered cattle. They beat abbots and elders on their heels with sticks [...] demanding extra from them. The sack ruined the monks, and the priceless artifacts of St. Sophia cathedral went into Ivan’s fisc. [...] He confiscated treasure in 27 of the oldest monasteries.

=== Subjugation of Novgorod ===
Though Ivan believed that Pimen and the church were the primary architects of the plot for Polish defection, he took out the brunt of his sadistic anger on the population of Novgorod, namely the upper and middle classes. The peasantry suffered a more generic, though equally brutal, punishment that contrasted with the targeted brutality directed at the more prominent members of society.

==== Trials at Gorodishche ====
Before his arrival in the city, Ivan's army had rounded up and detained the leading merchants, traders and officials along with their families. They were tortured for information regarding the supposed defection and liaison with the Polish king. The judges employed exceedingly cruel tortures to facilitate their inquiries, including burning with a "clever fire-making device" called a grill by the chronicler, roasting over fires, or being strung up by one's hands and having one's eyebrows singed off. An equally brutal punishment also awaited many upper and upper-middle-class families, including those implicated or questioned.

Women and children of all ages were bound and thrown from a high bank into the Volkhov river where they were trapped under the ice. Soldiers patrolled the water in boats, armed with boat hooks, spears, lances and axes, pushing down anyone who managed to surface alive. Those condemned by the court, after enduring questions under torture, were often tied to sleds and dragged through town until they too were forced off the bridge into the river.

The "Novgorod Chronicle" has been able to identify many of the people summoned to the courts for examination. They included boyars from the archbishop's court (and many serving-men), lesser boyars, merchants, and traders. The court condemned approximately 200 gentry, more than 100 servants, 45 secretaries and chancery people, and a proportionate number of families to die during their occupation of the city.

==== Treatment of the lower classes ====
===== Middle class, merchants =====
In addition to the tortures visited on the upper and middle classes, the peasants and paupers also were treated with disregard and disdain, albeit of a broader nature. The oprichniki centered its attack on the townspeople around two main objectives: to increase the royal treasury and to terrorize the lower classes into submission. Ivan's fear of conspiracies and revolution in any combination, led him to try to quell disaffection and discourage revolutionary tendencies, generally through the manipulation of fear and violence.

Near the end of the greater part of the Gorodische trials, Ivan ordered an attack on the trade streets of Novgorod, hoping to cripple the middle-class merchants (generally considered to be the seat of discontented revolutionary ideas) in order to suppress popular insurrection and guarantee dependency and submission. The oprichniki were to seize all profitable goods and destroy shops and storehouses, then move into the suburbs, where their instructions were to loot and destroy homes and kill all inhabitants who resisted (and, periodically, even those who complied), regardless of age or sex. Cold, hunger, and disease also killed the hundreds of families that were evicted and exiled from the city and surrounding villages.

===== Lower class =====
The famines that had plagued the area for the previous years (exacerbated by the oprichniki's razing of the farm land on their trek to Novgorod) had drawn many of the poor from the surrounding land into the city for shelter. With little regard for the lives at stake, the tsar ordered the collected paupers and beggars expelled from the city in the middle of winter, abandoning them to die of exposure or starvation.

== Ramifications ==
=== Pskov and Moscow ===
Ivan and the oprichniki continued to brutalize Novgorod until 12 February, when the troops withdrew leaving the destroyed city in the hands of the remaining population. They continued with this murderous quest to rid the kingdom of traitors, moving first to Pskov for a brief (and bizarre) interlude, then back to Moscow, where Ivan continued to arrest and interrogate anyone he considered guilty, dangerous or even a possible threat. He looked into the supposed treachery at Novgorod within his own court, examining who had contact with the archbishop and therefore may have been involved in the plot.

His suspicions were especially focused on several prominent members of the boyar court, Alexis Basmanov and his son, Nikita Funikov (the treasurer), Viskovaty (the keeper of the seal), Semeon Yakovlev, Vasily Stepanov (the crown secretary), Andrei Vasiliev, and Prince Afanasy Viazemsky.

While the details of the investigation have been lost, the trial results are known. Most of these men, court favourites Basmanov and Viazemsky included, were condemned to death along with Prince Peter Obolensky-Serebriany and a handful of others. Most others, around 180 people, were given pardon. Pimen of Novgorod was removed first to Alexandrov and finally to Tula, where he died under uncertain circumstances.

=== Casualties ===
Ivan's terrible "vengeance" left Novgorod severely wounded. The death toll of the massacre is uncertain. According to the Third Novgorod Chronicle, the massacre lasted for five weeks. The First Pskov Chronicle gives the number of victims as 60,000. These numbers are debated, however, and are not from an impartial source. Western sources from the time give figures ranging from 2,700 to 27,000 killed. Modern researchers estimate the number of victims in a range from 2,500 up to 12,000. Ruslan Skrynnikov, reconstructing the sinodiki (prayer lists) of the Kirillo-Belozersky Monastery, found only 1,505 named victims of the massacre, although these were most likely elite citizens and lesser citizens were not listed. Based on these lists, Skrynnikov considers that the number of victims was 2,000 to 3,000. As the author of Ivan the Terrible (Ivan Grozny), R.G. Skrynnikov stated, "the sack of Novgorod is the most repulsive episode in the brutal history of the oprichnina. The cruel, senseless slaughter of innocent people made oprichnina synonymous with lawlessness and excess."

=== Decline of Novgorod ===
Ivan's attack, while not solely at fault, contributed heavily to the decline of the once great city of Novgorod. An attack from one's own ruler, especially one as devastating to life and property as Ivan's campaign against Novgorod, would have been psychologically crippling, even more so when considered with the previous blows dealt to the city by Ivan IV and his grandfather. After the attack, many of the inhabitants either fled the city to escape persecution from Moscow, or died from increasingly damning conditions, exacerbated by high taxes and food shortages (and the epidemics that tend to accompany poor living conditions) that followed the departure of the oprichniki.

As part of his attack Ivan burned the fields, laying waste to roughly 90 percent of the arable land surrounding Novgorod. Coupled with the crop failures of the years before, this would create a massive food shortage (and cause supply problems for Russia in the Livonian war). With the loss of the majority of its production capacity and the economy essentially in ruins, Novgorod, a city that, until Ivan III, rivaled Moscow for the seat of power in Russia, lost its political standing and the Novgorod Republic officially became a thing of the past.

== See also ==
- Livonian War
