= Alexander Presnyakov =

Russian historian (1870–1929)

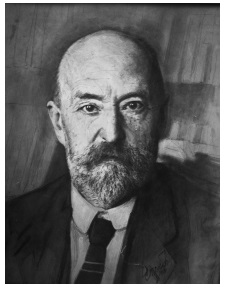

Alexander Yevgenyevich Presnyakov (Александр Евгеньевич Пресняков; 21 April (3 May), 1870 Odessa – 30 September 1929 Leningrad, USSR ) was a Russian historian who attempted to reform the Saint Petersburg school of imperial historiography after the Russian Revolution. He was elected into the Russian Academy of Sciences as a corresponding member in 1920.

Presnyakov was born in Odessa and spent his childhood in Tiflis. A brilliant disciple of Sergey Platonov, he published several important studies of medieval Russia, including Princely Law in Old Rus (1909), The Tsardom of Muscovy (1918), and The Development of the State of Great Russia (1918). He opposed Platonov in admitting the distinct nature of the medieval Lithuanian statehood.

After the Russian Revolution Presnyakov authored the revisionist biographies of Alexander I and Nicholas I. He helped establish and run the Institute of Historical Studies, a branch of the Petrograd University, and managed the Leningrad branch of the RANION History Institute. It was shortly after Presnyakov's death that his mentor Platonov, as well as their disciples, faced persecution from the government. His library was acquired by the Columbia University in 1931.
