= Alexandrov Kremlin =

Kremlin of the city of Alexandrov in Russia from 1564 to 1581

Coordinates: 56°24′00″N 38°44′22″E

- Near Alexandrov in Russia
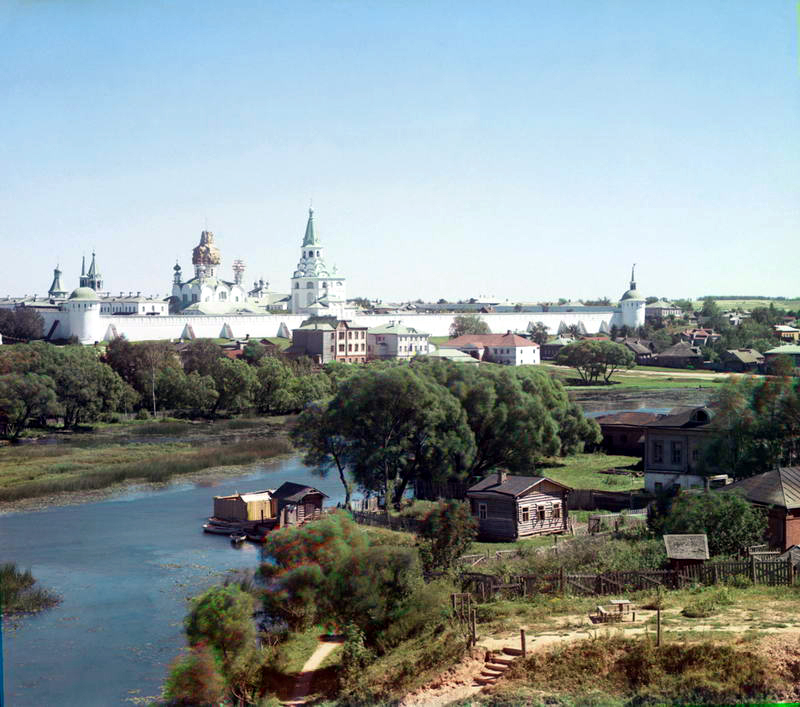
- Alexandrov Kremlin by Sergey Prokudin-Gorsky, 1911

Site information
- Type: Fortress

Location
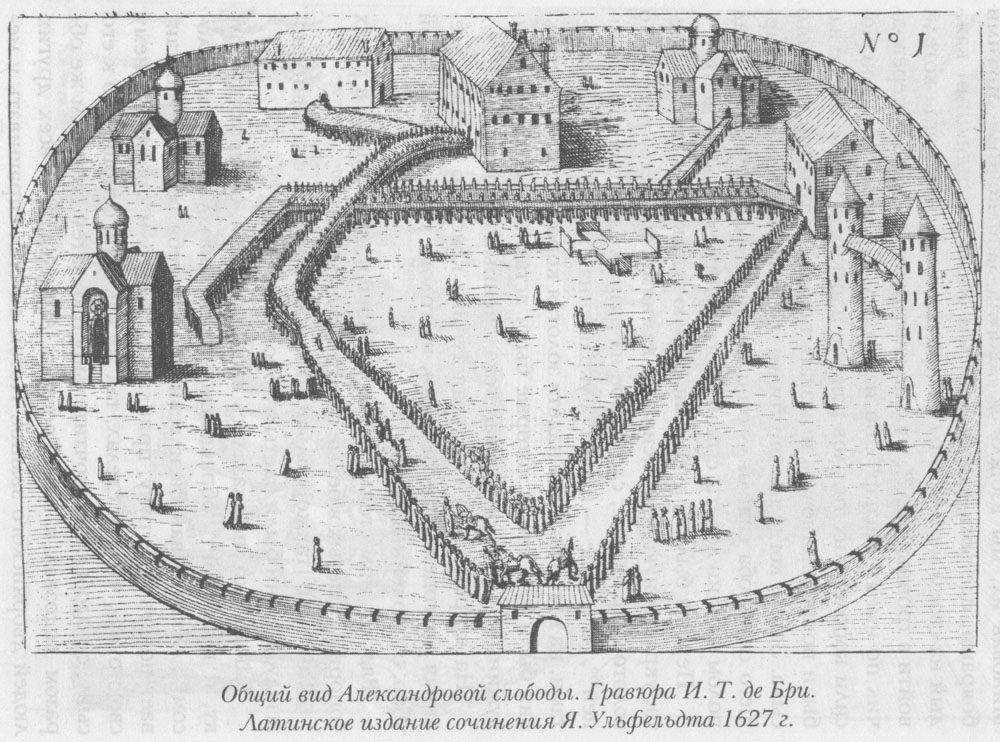
- Alexandrov Kremlin in the 16th century

The tsar’s residence in the Alexandrovskaya village (also known as the Alexandrovsky Kremlin) is an old Russian fortress which served as the actual capital of the oprichnina in the Moscow state from 1564 until 1581. It was situated on the current territory of the city of Alexandrov, Vladimir Oblast.

== History ==
Alexandrovskaya village dates back to the middle of the 14th century. Grand Duke Vasily III had a country palace built there and used to bring his family and the entire court to it. The palace did not survive.

The Pokrovsky (Intercession of the Virgin) cathedral was sanctified in 1513 and later it was blessed anew as the Trinity (Troitsky) Cathedral. Its appearance has changed somewhat since the 16th century; some of the architectural details such as windows, e.g., belong to a later period. Originally, red brick and white stone were used in the outer decoration of the cathedral but brick parts were later painted over. Some of the interior fresco paintings date back to the 14th century as do the white stone carvings in the interior portals.

Ivan the Terrible moved to the Alexandrovskaya fortress in 1565. The residence was immediately fortified with a bulwark, wooden walls, and a moat. The village became the actual capital of the country. The oprichnina was founded there and the march on the Novgorod Republic started from the village.

As Novgorod was looted Ivan brought the famous gates of its Saint Sophia Cathedral (1336) to the village and had them installed at the southern entrance of the Assumption (Trinity) cathedral. The gates combine religious and fantastic subjects; there is, for instance, the image of a centaur. The gates were made with the use of the old technique in which the door was first carved and then rubbed with a mixture of liquid gold and mercury.

The western entrance was embellished with the old (1344-1358) doors that Ivan had removed from the Transfiguration (Spaso-Preobrazhensky) church in Tver. An etched picture of the Holy Trinity is still preserved on one of the doors.

The Alexandovsky Kremlin was also the place where the tsar received ambassadors from many countries of Europe, such as Sweden, Denmark, Austria, England, and Rzeczpospolita.

The tsar left the fortress in 1581 and never returned there again. The Assumption (Uspensky) nunnery was opened on its territory in the second half of the 17th century.

During Soviet times the fortress and the former nunnery were used as a museum. At present, the territory of the Kremlin is shared by a museum and the revived nunnery.
