= Vladimir Kobrin =

Russian medieval historian (1930-1990)

Vladimir Borisovich Kobrin (Russian: Владимир Борисович Кобрин; born July 5, 1930, Moscow, USSR — December 30, 1990, Moscow, USSR) was a leading authority on the aristocracy of late medieval Russia.

He graduated from the Moscow University in 1951 and continued Stepan Veselovsky's studies of medieval Russian aristocracy after the latter's death in 1952. He viewed the Oprichnina as a prop for Ivan IV's dictatorship and described it as a social catastrophe. Kobrin's popular biography of Ivan the Terrible was published in 1989.

After the Perestroika was launched in 1985, Kobrin was involved in the publication of A. A. Zimin's controversial manuscripts.
