= Sergey Platonov =

Russian historian (1860-1933)

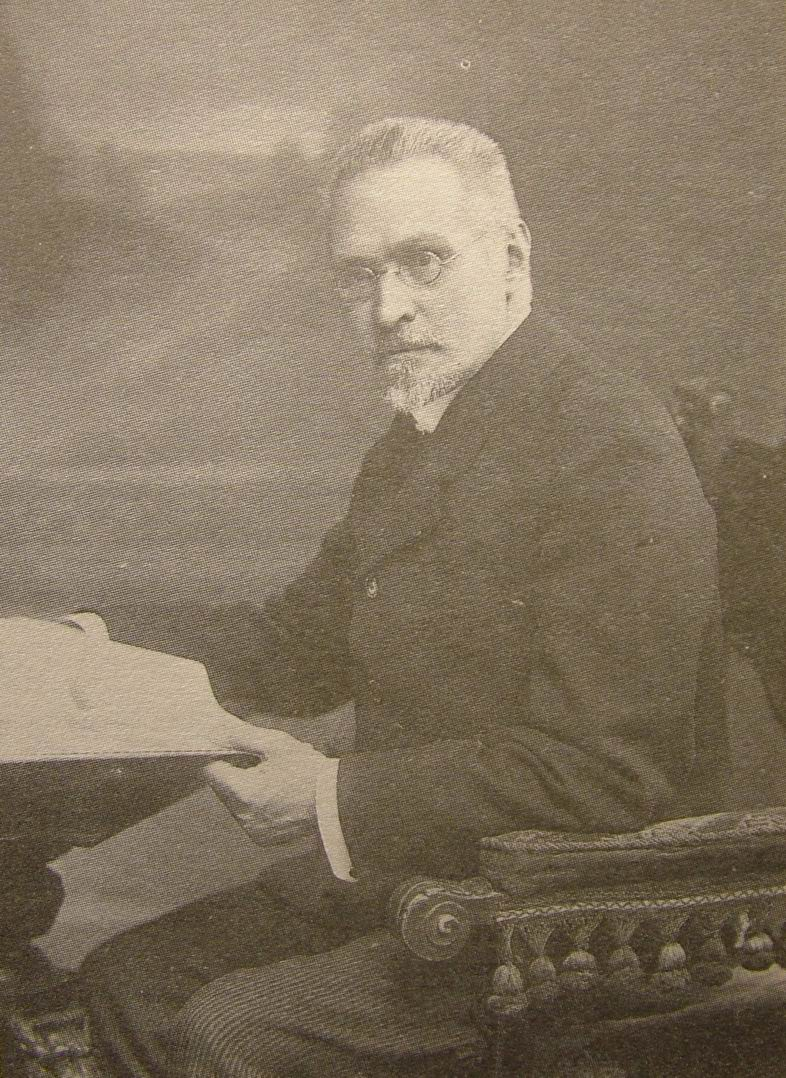
Sergey Platonov in 1913. Photo by Karl Bulla

Sergey Fyodorovich Platonov (Russian: Сергей Фёдорович Платонов; 28 June [16 June O.S.], 1860 – 10 January 1933) was a Russian historian who led the official St Petersburg school of imperial historiography before and after the Russian Revolution.

== Life and career ==
Platonov was born in the city of Chernigov, Russian Empire and attended a private gymnasium in St. Petersburg until 1878, when he went to the Department of History and Philology of St. Petersburg University until 1882. He was a student of Konstantin Bestuzhev-Ryumin, who recommended that he be given the opportunity to "prepare to be a professor."

Platonov belonged to the "St. Petersburg school" of Russian historiography, which focused on the study and publication of historical sources. He earned his master's degree in 1888 with a thesis on Old Russian Legends and Tales about the Seventeenth-Century Time of Troubles as a Historical Source, receiving the Uvarov Award of the Academy of Sciences.

Platonov's scholarly career was centered at the University of St Petersburg, where he was held in highest repute for his detailed studies of the Time of Troubles (1923) and Oprichnina. His history textbooks, impeccably written and easily readable, enjoyed such popularity that he was asked by the tsar to teach history to his children. In 1909, he was admitted to the Russian Academy of Sciences.

Unlike some of his disciples (such as Alexander Presnyakov), Platonov did not change his views after the Revolution and stood aloof from the mainstream Marxist historiography, as represented by Mikhail Pokrovsky. Nevertheless, he was permitted to administer the Archaeographic Commission in 1918-29, the Pushkin House (i.e., the Russian Literature Institute) in 1925–1929 and the Academy's Library in 1925–1928.

On 12 January 1930 Platonov was accused of taking part in a royalist conspiracy, arrested and exiled to Samara, where he died three years later on January 10, 1933. However, a number of his historical works continued to be reprinted later in the decade, and in 1967 he was formally rehabilitated.

== Bibliography ==
- History of Russia (1925), New York, Macmillan.
- The Time of Troubles: A Historical Study of the Internal Crises and Social Struggle in Sixteenth- and Seventeenth-Century Muscovy (1970), Lawrence, University Press of Kansas.
- Moscow and the West, (1972), Hattiesburg, Academic International.
- Boris Godunov, Tsar of Russia, (1973) with an introductory essay. Gulf Breeze, Florida, Academic International Press (includes 'S.F. Platonov: Eminence and Obscurity' an introductory essay by John T. Alexander
- Ivan the Terrible, (1974), Gulf Breeze, Florida, Academic International Press.
