= Oprichnina =

State policy of Ivan IV (1565–1572)

Oprichnik forces Russian: Опричные войска, romanized: Oprichnie voyska
- Active: 1565—1572; de jure to 1584
- Country: Tsardom of Russia
- Allegiance: Tsar
- Size: 6,000
- Nickname: Oprichnina

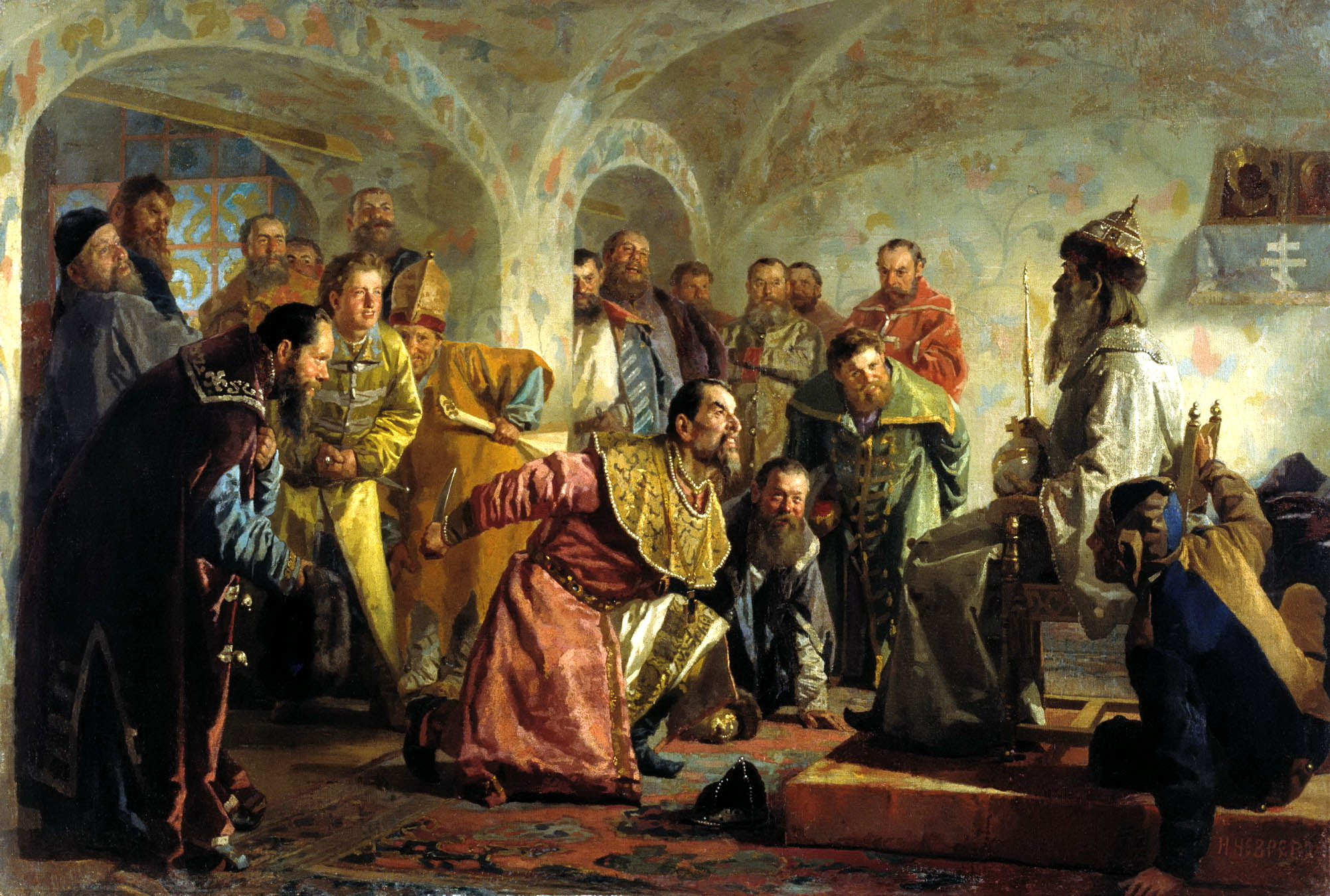
Oprichniki, by Nikolai Nevrev, shows the mock coronation of Ivan Fyodorov-Chelyadnin (enthroned) accused of conspiracy, before his execution. The man with the knife is Ivan the Terrible himself: according to Alexander Guagnini, Ivan stabbed Fyodorov-Chelyadnin in the heart and the oprichniks finished him off.

The oprichnina (Russian: опри́чнина, IPA: [ɐˈprʲitɕnʲɪnə]; from опричь, oprich, 'apart from, except') was a state policy implemented by Tsar Ivan the Terrible in Russia between 1565 and 1572. The policy included mass repression of the boyars (Russian aristocrats), including public executions and confiscation of their land and property. In this context the term can also refer to:

- The notorious organization of six thousand oprichniki, the first political police in the history of Russia.
- The portion of Russia, ruled directly by Ivan the Terrible, where his oprichniki operated.
- The corresponding period of Russian history.

== Causes ==
In 1558, Tsar Ivan IV started the Livonian War. A broad coalition, which included Poland, Lithuania and Sweden, became drawn into the war against Russia. The war was drawn-out (it continued until 1583) and expensive; raids by Crimean Tatars, Polish and Lithuanian invasions, famines, a trading blockade and the escalating costs of war ravaged Russia.

In 1564, Prince Andrey Kurbsky defected to the Lithuanians and commanded the Lithuanian army against Russia, devastating the Russian region of Velikiye Luki. Tsar Ivan began to suspect other aristocrats of a readiness to betray him.

Historians Vasily Klyuchevsky (1841–1911) and Stepan Veselovsky (1876–1952) explained the oprichnina in terms of Ivan's paranoia and denied larger social aims for the oprichnina. However, historian Sergey Platonov (1860–1933) argued that Ivan IV intended the oprichnina as a suppression of the rising boyar aristocracy. Professor Isabel de Madariaga (1919–2014) expanded this idea to explain the oprichnina as Ivan's attempt to subordinate all independent social classes to the autocracy.

== Establishment ==
On December 3, 1564, Ivan IV departed Moscow on pilgrimage. While such journeys were routine for the throne, Ivan neglected to set in place the usual arrangements for rule in his absence. Moreover, an unusually large personal guard, many boyars, and the treasury accompanied him.

After a month of silence, Ivan finally issued two letters from his fortifications at Aleksandrova Sloboda on January 3, 1565. The first addressed the elite of Moscow and accused them of embezzlement and treason. Further accusations concerned the clergy and their protection of denounced boyars. In conclusion, Ivan announced his abdication. The second letter addressed the population of Moscow and claimed "he had no anger against" its citizenry. Divided between Aleksandrova Sloboda and Moscow, the boyar court was unable to rule in the absence of Ivan and feared the wrath of the Muscovite citizenry. Envoys departed for Aleksandrova Sloboda (Note: Compare: "The Metropolitan [...] sent Archbishop Pimen and Archimandrite Levkii as his envoys to Aleksandrovskaia Sloboda [...]. [...] The envoys from Moscow reached Aleksandrovskaia Sloboda on 5 January 1565, followed by a long trail of nobles, armed men, merchants, townspeople and the common people of the city. [...] The Tsar received first the ecclesiastics, then the boyars [...].") to beg Ivan to return to the throne.

Ivan IV agreed to return on condition that he might prosecute people for treason outside legal limitations. He demanded the right to execute and confiscate the land of traitors without interference from the boyar council or from the church. To pursue his investigations, Ivan decreed the establishment of the oprichnina (originally a term for land left to a noble widow, separate from her children's land). He also raised a levy of 100,000 rubles to pay for the oprichnina.

== Organization ==
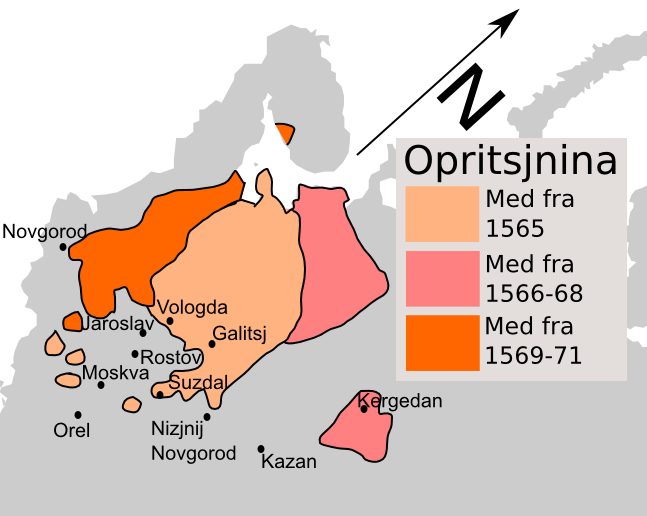
Map of the Oprichnina territory. From 1565 From 1566–1568 From 1569–1571

The oprichnina consisted of a separate territory within the borders of Russia, mostly in the territory of the former Novgorod Republic in the north. This region included many of the financial centers of the state, including the salt region of Staraya Russa and prominent merchant towns. Ivan held exclusive power over the oprichnina territory. The Boyar Council ruled the zemshchina ('land'), the second division of the state. Until 1568, the oprichnina relied upon many administrative institutions under zemshchina jurisdiction. Only when conflict between the zemshchina and oprichnina reached its peak did Ivan create independent institutions within the oprichnina.

Ivan also stipulated the creation of a personal guard known as the oprichniki (Russian: опри́чники, IPA: [ɐˈprʲitɕnʲɪk], meaning 'men of oprichnina'; singular: oprichnik). The corps also served as police, and soldiers. Originally it was a thousand strong. Some scholars believe that Ivan's second wife, the Circassian Maria Temryukovna, first had the idea of forming the organization. This theory comes from Heinrich von Staden, a German oprichnik. Upon acceptance, the new oprichniki were required to swear an oath of allegiance:

I swear to be true to the Lord, Grand Prince, and his realm, to the young Grand Princes, and to the Grand Princess, and not to maintain silence about any evil that I may know or have heard or may hear which is being contemplated against the Tsar, his realms, the young princes or the Tsaritsa. I swear also not to eat or drink with the zemshchina, and not to have anything in common with them. On this I kiss the cross.

The noble oprichniki Aleksei Basmanov and Afanasy Viazemsky oversaw recruitment. Nobles and townsmen free of relations to the zemshchina or its administration were eligible for Ivan’s new guard. Henri Troyat has emphasized the lowly origin of the oprichnina recruits. However, historian Vladimir Kobrin has contested that a shift to the lower classes constituted a late development in the oprichnina era. Many early oprichniki had close ties to the princely and boyar clans of Russia.

Territorial divisions under the oprichnina led to mass resettlement. When the property of zemshchina nobles fell within oprichnina territory, oprichniki seized their lands and forced the owners onto zemshchina land. The oprichnina territory included primarily service estates. Alexander Zimin and Stepan Veselovsky have argued that this division left hereditary landownership largely unaffected. However, Platonov and other scholars have posited that resettlement aimed to undermine the power of the landed nobility. Pavlov has cited the relocation of zemshchina servicemen from oprichnina territories onto heredity estates as a critical blow to the power of the princely class. The division of hereditary estates diminished the influence of the princely elites in their native provinces. The worst affected was the province of Suzdal which lost 80% of its gentry.

The oprichniki enjoyed social and economic privileges under the oprichnina. While zemshchina boyars lost both hereditary and service land, the oprichniki retained hereditary holdings that fell in zemshchina land. Moreover, Ivan granted the oprichnina the spoils of a heavy tax levied upon the zemshchina nobles. The rising oprichniki owed their allegiance to Ivan, not heredity or local bonds.

== Operations ==
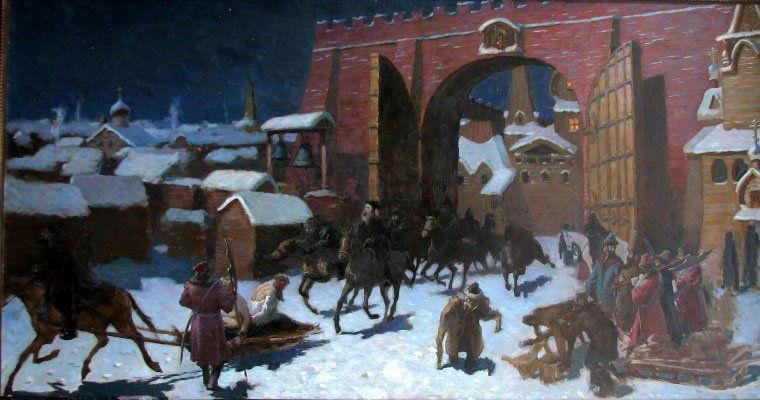
The oprichniki and the Boyars, by Vasily Khudyakov

The first wave of persecutions targeted primarily the princely clans of Russia, most notably the influential families of Suzdal. Ivan executed, exiled, or tortured prominent members of the boyar clans on questionable accusations of conspiracy. 1566 saw the oprichnina extended to eight central districts. Of the 12,000 nobles there, 570 became oprichniks, and the rest were expelled. They had to make their way to the zemshchina in mid-winter; peasants who helped them were executed. In a show of clemency, Ivan recalled a number of nobles to Moscow. The Tsar even called upon zemshchina nobles for a Zemsky Sobor concerning the Livonian War. Ivan posed the question of whether Russia should surrender the Livonian territories to recently victorious Lithuania or maintain the effort to conquer the region. The body approved war measures and advanced emergency taxes to support the draining treasury.

However, the Zemsky Sobor also forwarded a petition to end the oprichnina. The Tsar reacted with a renewal of the oprichnina terror. He ordered the immediate arrest of the petitioners and executed the alleged leaders of the protest. Further investigations tied Ivan Federov, leader of the zemshchina duma, to a plot to overthrow Tsar Ivan; Federov was removed from court and executed shortly thereafter.

The overthrow of King Erik XIV of Sweden in 1568 and the death of Ivan's second wife in 1569 exacerbated Ivan's suspicions. His attention turned to the northwestern city of Novgorod. The second largest city in Russia, Novgorod housed a large service nobility with ties to some of the condemned boyar families of Moscow. Despite the sack of the city under Ivan III, Novgorod maintained a political organization removed from Russia’s central administration. Moreover, the influence of the city in the northeast had increased as the city fronted the military advance against the Lithuanian border. The treasonous surrender of the border town Izborsk to Lithuania also caused Ivan to question the faith of border towns.

Ivan IV and an oprichniki detachment instituted a month-long terror in Novgorod (the Massacre of Novgorod). The oprichniki raided the town and conducted executions among all classes. As the Livonian campaign constituted a significant drain on state resources, Ivan targeted ecclesiastical and merchant holdings with particular fervor. After Novgorod, the oprichniki company turned to the adjacent merchant city Pskov. The city received relatively merciful treatment. The oprichniki limited executions and focused primarily upon the seizure of ecclesiastical wealth. According to a popular apocryphal account, Nicholas Salos of Pskov the fool-for-Christ prophesied the fall of Ivan and thus motivated the deeply religious Tsar to spare the city. Alternatively, Ivan may have felt no need to institute a terror in Pskov due to his prior sack of the city in wake of the Izborsk treason. The dire financial condition of the state and the need to bolster the war treasury likely inspired the second raid.

Modern theories suggest that the motivating purpose for the organization and existence of the oprichniki was to oppress people or groups opposed to the Tsar. Riding black horses and led by Ivan himself, the group terrorized civilian populations. Sometimes called the cromeshnina (selected) because they were a hand-picked body, the oprichniki dressed in black garb, similar to a monastic habit, and carried attached to their saddles a severed dog's head (to sniff out treason and enemies of the Tsar), or an actual wolf's head and a broom (to sweep them away). The wolf's head was also symbolic of the hounds of hell tearing at the heels of the Tsar's enemies. The logistics of acquiring the canine heads was quite gruesome. Due to the lack of taxidermy, the severed and drained heads would only remain frozen for the winter months of the year. To maintain their image, the oprichnik required a constant supply of fresh heads. Ivan himself carried a fearsome canine head made of iron with jaws that would open and snap shut as his horse galloped.

The oprichniki were ordered to execute anyone disloyal to Ivan and used various methods of torture to do so, including quartering, boiling, impalement, and roasting victims tied to poles over an open fire.

Oprichniki were devout Christians of the Eastern Orthodox Church similarly to the Tsar himself.

When Ivan declared himself the "Hand of God", he selected 300 of the oprichniki to be his personal "brotherhood" and live in his castle at Aleksandrovskaia Sloboda near Vladimir. At 4 a.m., these select oprichniki attended a sermon given by Ivan, then performed the day's ritual executions. The oprichniki sought to lead an externally ascetic lifestyle, like the monks they emulated, but it was punctuated by acts of cruelty and debauchery. In the Novgorod incident, the oprichniks killed an estimated 1500 "big people" (nobles), although the actual number of victims is unknown.

The persecutions began to target the oprichnina leadership itself. The tsar had already refused Basmanov and Viazemsky participation in the Novgorod campaign. Upon his return, Ivan condemned the two to prison, where they died shortly thereafter. Pavlov links Ivan's turn against the higher echelons of oprichniki to the increasing number of the lower-born among their ranks. Ivan may have reacted to the apparent discontent among the princely oprichniki over the brutal treatment of Novgorod. Furthermore, class disparity may have set the lower recruits against the princely oprichniki. As Ivan already suspected the older oprichniki on the issue of Novgorod, the lower-born recruits may have advanced the new persecutions to increase their influence in the oprichnina hierarchy.

== Disbandment ==
1572 saw the fall of the oprichnina state structure. The zemshchina and oprichnina territories were reunited and placed under rule of a reformed Boyar Council, which included members from both sides of the divided apparatus.

Scholars have cited diverse factors to explain the dissolution of the oprichnina. When the Crimean Tatars burnt Moscow in 1571 during the Russo-Crimean War, the oprichniki failed to offer serious resistance. The success of the Tatars may have shaken the Tsar's faith in the effectiveness of the oprichnina. Ivan may have found state division ineffective in a period of war and its significant social and economic pressures. Alternatively, Ivan may have deemed the oprichnina a success; the weakening of the princely elite having been achieved, the Tsar may have felt that the terror had simply outlived its usefulness.

== Legacy ==
Scholar Robert O. Crummey and Platonov have emphasized the social impact of the mass resettlements under the oprichnina. The division of large estates into smaller oprichnik plots subjected the peasants to a stricter landowning dominion. Furthermore, a new itinerant population emerged as state terror and the seizure of lands forced many peasants from their lands. The increase in itinerants may have motivated the ultimate institutionalization of serfdom by the Russian throne. The oprichnina coincided with the major social and economic crisis in Russia and, according to some contemporary and historical accounts, contributed to it.

Historian Isabel de Madariaga has emphasized the role of the oprichnina in the consolidation of aristocratic power. Resettlement drastically reduced the power of the hereditary nobility. Oprichniki landowners who owed their loyalty to the throne replaced an aristocracy that might have evolved independent political ambitions. Alternatively, Crummey has summarized the social effects of the oprichnina as a failure. From this perspective, the oprichnina failed to pursue coherent social motives and instead pursued a largely unfocused terror. Such interpretations are derived from the 1960s works by Ruslan Skrynnikov who described the oprichnina as the reign of terror designed to root out every possible challenge to the autocracy:

Under conditions of mass terror, universal fear and denunciations, the apparatus of violence acquired an entire overwhelming influence on the political structure of the leadership. The infernal machine of terror escaped from the control of its creators. The final victims of the oprichnina proved to be all of those who had stood at its cradle.

== Cultural depictions ==
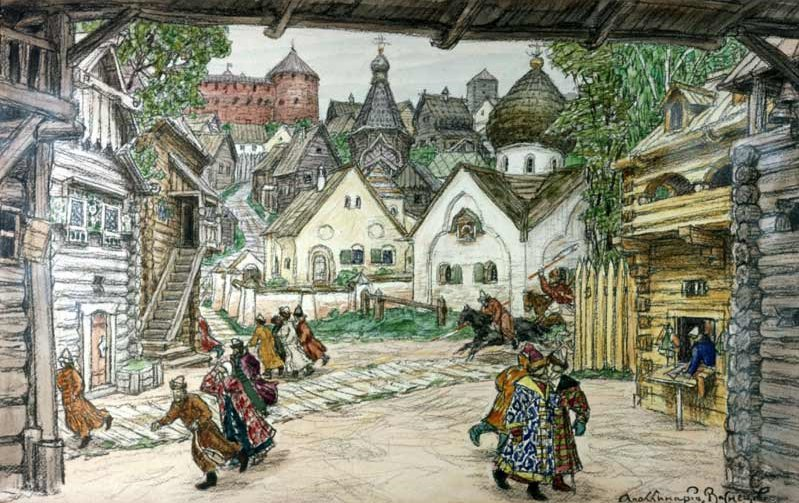
"The street in the town": people fleeing at the arrival of the oprichniki, inspired by the opera The Oprichnik by Tchaikovsky, painted by Apollinary Vasnetsov in 1911

Ivan Lazhechnikov wrote the tragedy The Oprichniki (Russian: Опричники), on which Tchaikovsky based his opera The Oprichnik. In turn, Tchaikovsky's opera inspired a 1911 painting by Apollinary Vasnetsov, depicting a city street and people fleeing in panic at the arrival of the oprichniki.

Oprichniki Malyuta Skuratov, Alexei Basmanov and his son Fyodor Basmanov are main characters in Ivan the Terrible, a classic historical epic film (released in two parts in 1944 and 1946) directed by Sergei Eisenstein.

In modern media:

- A fantasy variation on the oprichnina appears in the Japanese light novel franchise Gate. It retains the name, purpose, activities, dog head motif, and even the use of brooms from the historic original.
- Vladimir Sorokin's 2006 novel Day of the Oprichnik imagines the return of the oprichniki in a futuristic theocratic Russia in which the oprichnina has been reestablished. The novel's oprichniki drive red cars with severed dog heads as hood ornaments, rape and kill dissenting nobles, and consume massive amounts of alcohol and narcotics, all while praising the monarchy and the Russian Orthodox Church.
- The song "Dog and Broom" on Arghoslent's Hornets of the Pogrom album focuses specifically on the oprichniki, and makes reference to their actions during the 1570 Novgorod Massacre.
- Author W. E. B. Griffin's novel Black Ops claims as a plot point that all subsequent Russian secret police agencies such as the SVR are descendants of the oprichniki.
- Latter-day oprichniki appear in Eric Flint's alternate history novel 1636: The Kremlin Games and its sequels.

== See also ==
- Crisis of the late 16th century in Russia
- Cheka
- Reign of Terror
- Anti-clericalism in France
- NKVD
- KGB
- Okhrana
- Burning of books and burying of scholars
- Literary inquisition
- Great Purge

== Bibliography ==
- De Madariaga, Isabel (2006) [2005]. Ivan the Terrible: First Tsar of Russia. New Haven and London: Yale University Press. p. 526. ISBN 978-0-300-11973-2.
- Pavlov, Andreĭ Pavlovich; Perrie, Maureen (2003). Ivan the Terrible. Profiles in Power. London: Pearson Education Limited. p. 244. ISBN 978-0-582-09948-7. (Later republished by Routledge / Taylor & Francis.)
- Leitsch, Walter (1974). "Russo-Polish Confrontation". In Hunczak, Taras (ed.). Russian Imperialism. Rutgers University Press. p. 140.
- Gordievsky, Oleg; Andrew, Christopher (1999). KGB: The Inside Story of its Intelligence Operations from Lenin to Gorbachev (Russian language ed.). Moscow: Centerpoligraph. p. 21. ISBN 5-227-00437-4.
