= Ruslan Skrynnikov =

Russian historian (1931–2009)

Ruslan Grigorievich Skrynnikov (Руслан Григорьевич Скрынников; 8 January 1931, Kutaisi, Georgian SSR – 16 June 2009, St. Petersburg, Russia) was a Russian historian who studied the reign of Ivan the Terrible. He later moved on to study the Time of Troubles.

For Skrynnikov, control over the bureaucratic apparatus (rather than the issue of centralization) was the primary point of contention explaining Muscovite political struggles of the 15th and 16th centuries. In the late 1960s he described Ivan's Oprichnina as the reign of terror designed to root out every possible challenge to the autocracy:

Under conditions of mass terror, universal fear and denunciations, the apparatus of violence acquired an entire overwhelming influence on the political structure of the leadership. The infernal machine of terror escaped from the control of its creators. The final victims of the Oprichnina proved to be all of those who had stood at its cradle.

Skrynnikov' monographs about the Oprichinina and the Russian conquest of Siberia have been reprinted many times and translated into other major languages. He also authored the biographies of Ivan III, Ivan IV, and other Russian tsars.
