= Fishing industry in Russia =

- Russia has a coastline of 37,653 km (23,396 mi).

General characteristics (2005 unless otherwise stated)
- EEZ area: 7,566,673 km^{2} (2,921,509 sq mi)
- Shelf area: 5 million square kilometres (1.9×10^{6} sq mi)
- Lake area: 79,400 km^{2} (30,700 sq mi)
- Land area: 16,995,800 km^{2} (6,562,100 sq mi)
- Employment: Primary: 100,000+ persons Secondary: 700,000+ persons
- Landing sites: Most volume: Most value:
- Consumption: 17.3 kg (38 lb) fish per capita (2003)
- Fisheries GDP: US$ 3.02 billion (2006)
- Export value: US$ 2.12 billion (2006)
- Import value: US$ 1.44 billion (2006)

Harvest (2005 unless otherwise stated)
- Wild inland: 72,000 tonnes (79,000 tons)
- Wild total: 3,190,946 tonnes (3,517,416 tons)
- Aquaculture inland: c. 110,000 tonnes (120,000 tons)
- Aquaculture marine: c. 5,000 tonnes (5,500 tons)
- Aquaculture total: 114,752 tonnes (126,492 tons)
- Fish total: 3,305,698 tonnes (3,643,908 tons)

The coastline of the Russian Federation is the fourth longest in the world after the coastlines of Canada, Greenland, and Indonesia. The Russian fishing industry has an exclusive economic zone (EEZ) of 7.6 million km^{2} including access to twelve seas in three oceans, together with the landlocked Caspian Sea and more than two million rivers.

According to the FAO, in 2005 the Russian fishing industry harvested 3,190,946 tonnes of fish from wild fisheries and another 114,752 tonnes from aquaculture. This made Russia the ninth leading producer of fish, with 2.3 percent of the world total.

== Management ==
Fisheries management is regulated by Russian federal laws. The federal law "On Fisheries and Protection of Aquatic Biological Resources" of December 2004 (referred to below as the Law on Fisheries) divides fisheries into three main categories" industrial, recreational, and subsistence fisheries of indigenous groups. Industrial fisheries includes coastal fisheries. This definition has been challenged and is under review.

The Law on Fisheries requires that total allowable catch (TAC) levels are set for fishery stocks. It defines these levels as the "scientifically justified annual catch of aquatic biological resources of particular species in a fishing area". However, the Law on Fisheries then goes on to state that industrial fisheries are not necessarily required to base their catch on TAC. The law does not explain this further, but calls for the federal government to issue a special TAC setting statute. Pacific salmon is the main stock that will probably not have TAC, but will have regulated fishing effort instead.

The Law on Fisheries also gives a definition of a fishing unit area and sets general principles for their use. The compiling of lists of fishing unit areas is delegated to the regional authorities. The Law on Fisheries has gaps and its application is criticized by parliamentarians and stakeholders. It may be expected that in the coming years at least two new federal laws, "On Coastal Fisheries" and "On Aquaculture", will be considered by Russian legislators.

Apart from TAC settings, fisheries are also regulated by the so-called Fishing Rules (Pravila rybolovstva). These rules are set separately for different geographical regions.

The Fishing Rules specify seasonal closures, closed areas, restrictions on specific gears such as restricting mesh sizes, minimum catch sizes, and restricted levels of allowable bycatch. Fisheries management has been changing since Soviet times, and further changes are likely.

The government has mismanaged the fisheries, with frequent restructuring of the institutions responsible for fishery management and control. Starting in 1992, the fishery authority has been reorganized at least five times. The head of the fishery authority was replaced seven times, and not one of these heads was a fishery professional. The issues involved in regulating fishing capacity were never really recognized. However, consistent fishery policies are starting to be developed now.

The extreme bureaucracy involved for a fishing vessel to make a port call and land fish results in coastal processing being bypassed. Instead, the seafood is just directly exported, unprocessed. Similarly, there are many bureaucratic difficulties in developing aquaculture. Getting a licence to use water and the necessary sanitary certificates is very time-consuming, although it does guarantee environmental and health safety. Ships built, purchased, or serviced outside of the Eurasian Economic Union face significant restrictions in landing catches caught in Russia's EEZ, and from 2022 will not be allocated any fishing quotas in Russian waters.

=== Artisanal ===
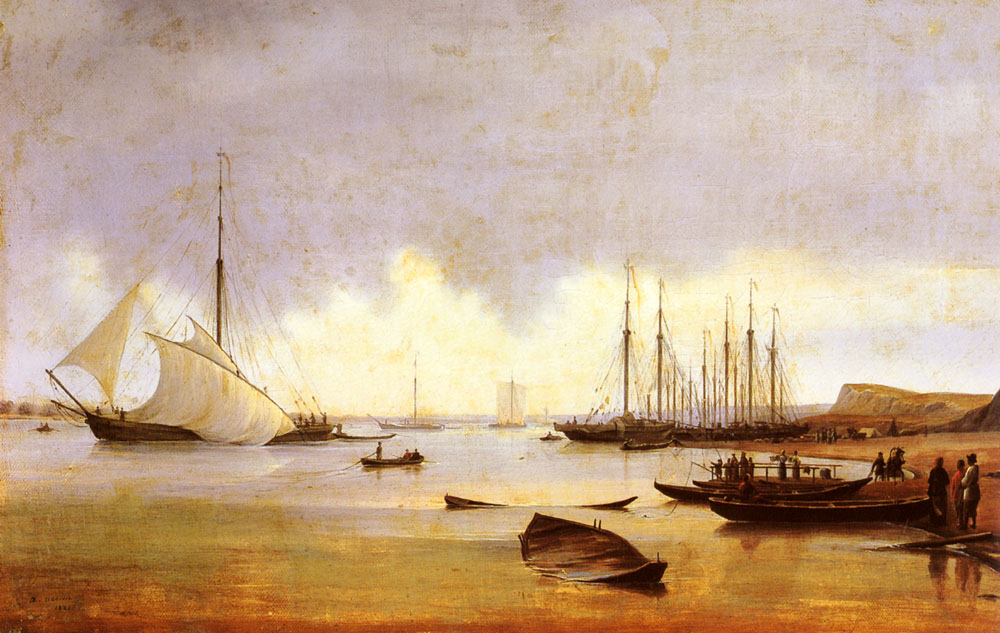
Fishing vessels off a jetty, believed to be Kostroma (Russia) Oil on canvas, 1839, by Anton Ivanov

There is no legally adopted term in Russia for artisanal fisheries. Artisanal or subsistence fishing usually refers to fishing mainly with traditional gear, with production delivered to the market but also used for subsistence. In Russia, the term covers also several kinds of fisheries classified as industrial, such as salmon, chars, whitefish, navaga, flounders and greenling fisheries in the Baltic, the Arctic and the Far Eastern Seas. Subsistence fishing by indigenous groups is also an issue. Indigenous fishers mainly work estuaries, lagoons and rivers (for anadromous fish). Legally, they are bound to use their catch for local consumption only. They are not allowed to sell their catch, but in reality, this is not always the case.

In Russia, poverty contributes to poaching and other threats to fishery resources. Poverty can leave people depending on natural resources to feed themselves. There may be little perceived incentive to protect fish and other aquatic life and to use them in a sustainable way. Lack of awareness and lack of public involvement in managing local resources can result in poaching, overfishing, and other kinds of illegal activities. Poaching by private individuals feeds the industrial IUU catch, and forms a vicious cycle.

The social impacts of traditional fisheries has rarely been analysed. The yearly fishing cycle still dominates life in the traditional fishing villages of the Pomor, dotted around the coast of the White Sea. Fishing has similarly influenced the life style of many indigenous groups, such as among settlers around the Pacific Coast, north of Siberia, and around the big lakes. In the late 1960s, administrative decisions were made to abandon many coastal villages and resettle people in larger settlements. This has disrupted the traditional ways and is associated with alcohol abuse and increased poverty. There is now a slow movement towards reviving cultural traditions. To succeed, there must also be a re-establishment of the sustainable fisheries that allowed such fishing communities to flourish.

=== Recreational ===
Recreational fishing occurs everywhere in Russia. The Fishing Rules do not distinguish recreational fishing from artisan fishing, so both are regulated under the same rules. In some areas, tourist fishing is growing.

In 1999, recreational and subsistence fishers took 4,300 tonnes, mostly perches and cyprinids. Later estimates are not available. The most significant recreational fishery by value is the Kola Peninsula Atlantic salmon fishery.

=== Commercial ===
Russia has three main commercial fisheries:

- marine fisheries – including brackish water and anadromous species, and estuarine fisheries
- inland fisheries
- aquaculture

Catch by fishery category, 2005
Category	Fishery zone	Catch tonne	Percent	Comment
Marine	Coastal EEZ		69	
Marine	Foreign EEZ		14.5	The reported catch in EEZs of foreign states is stable.
Marine	High seas		10	Catch on the high seas increased in the 2000s.
Inland		72,000	2.7	Inland fisheries are found everywhere in river basins and freshwater bodies, but the catch has constituted only a very small fraction of the total catch.
Aquaculture			3.6	Aquaculture (mainly freshwater) production is relatively small compared to capture fisheries, but is growing.

== Wild fisheries ==
=== EEZ ===
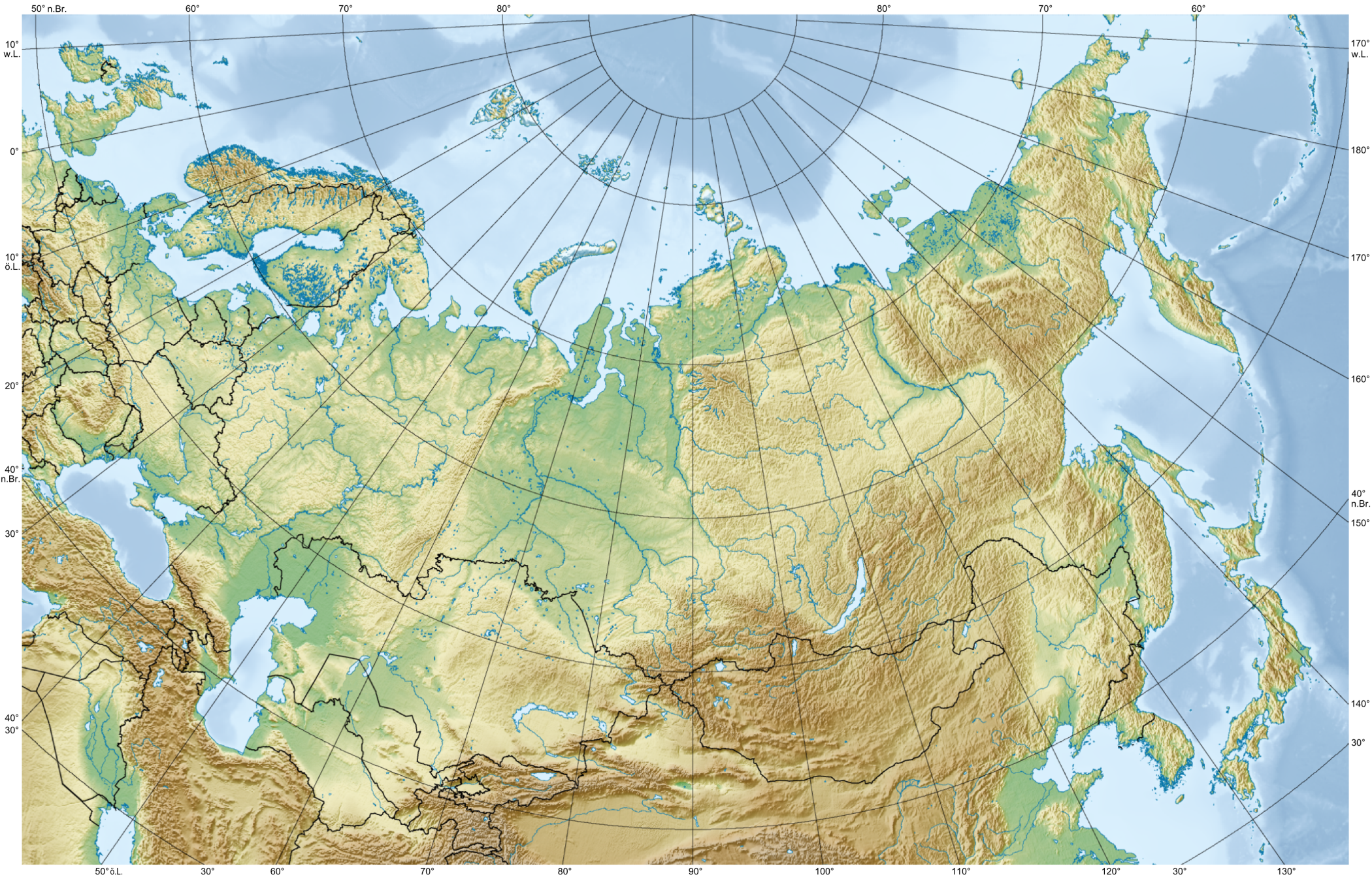
Relief map of Russia

Russia's marine fisheries are based on twelve seas from three oceans which surround Russia, the landlocked Caspian Sea, and the high seas beyond Russia's exclusive economic zone (EEZ). Marine capture fisheries in Russia's territorial seas, internal marine waters and the EEZ provided up to 75 percent of the total reported catch for 1996–2005.

The three oceans are:

- the Atlantic: with the Sea of Azov, Black Sea, Baltic, Barents Sea and White Sea
- the Arctic Ocean: with the Kara Sea, Laptev Sea, East Siberian Sea and Chuckchi Sea
- the Pacific: with the Bering Sea, Sea of Okhotsk and Sea of Japan.

Russia's EEZ
	Area km^{2}
Asia	6,382,530 km^{2}
Baltic	24,549
Barents Sea	1,159,594
Total EEZ	7,566,673

=== Catch profile ===
The officially recorded annual value of fisheries is about US$5 billion, equivalent to 0.3 percent of GDP. The fishery sector has been stable in absolute terms in recent years, so its share of GDP has reduced as the general economy has expanded.

Fisheries data in tonnes
2003	Production	Imports	Exports	Food supply	Per capita
Fish for direct human consumption	3,389,932	815,155	1,374,894	2,481,542	17.3 kg
Fish for animal feed and other purposes	348,652	—	—	—	

Due to the decreasing catch and a growing export to East Asian markets, Russian fisheries cannot meet current domestic demand for seafood. East Asian markets are more attractive to fishing enterprises than the domestic market. As a consequence, there are increasing imports for the affluent in big cities, with increasing subsistence and recreational fishing with its associated IUU catch.

=== Inland fisheries ===
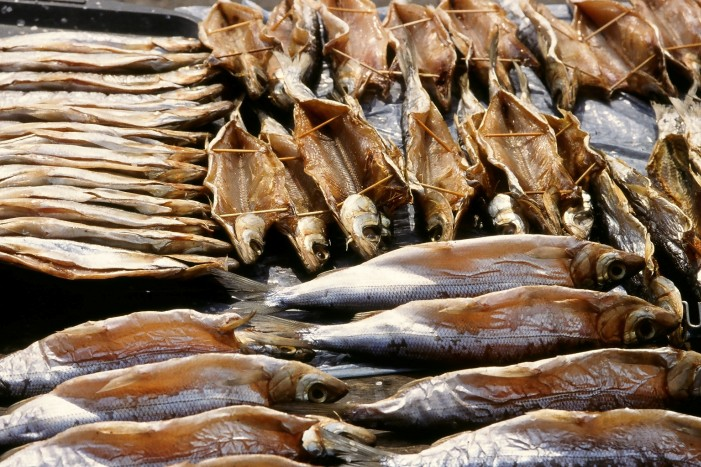
Omul fish, endemic to Lake Baikal. Smoked and on sale at Listvyanka market.

The biggest inland water is the landlocked Caspian Sea. The biggest lakes are Baikal (31,700 km^{2}), Ladoga (19,100 km^{2}) and Onega (9,700 km^{2}). Russia has more than 2 million rivers, the largest of which are, in order, Severnaya Dvina, Pechora, Dnieper, Volga, Ob', Don, Yenisei, Lena, Kolyma, Indigirka and Amur. The most important inland fishing area is the Ob'–Irtysh River Basin (about 27 percent). Sixty species are caught in the inland fisheries of Russia. In volume terms, whitefish (Coregonidae), cyprinids, zanders and perch are most important. Set nets are the most common gear used in inland water commercial fisheries. Seines are also used on big rivers and lakes, and small trawls on the big lakes. In 2005, the official catch in the inland waters was 72,000 tonnes.

Inland fish catch in tonnes
Water bodies or drainage areas	2005	Percent	Main species
Ob-Irtysh catchment (West Siberia)	19,200	26.7	
Enisei catchment	1,150	1.6	
Lakes			
Ladoga	2,900	4.0	cyprinids, perch and whitefish
Onega	2,100	2.9	cyprinids, perch and whitefish
Chudsko-Pskovskoye (Peipsi) (shared with Estonia)	4,000	5.6	cyprinids, smelt and coregonids
Ilmen	1,380	1.9	
Baikal	2,500	3.5	whitefish
Water reservoirs			
Rybinsk	1,040	1.4	
Kuibyshevskoye	2,110	2.9	
Saratovskoye	600	0.8	
Volgograd (on the Volga)	1,720	2.4	
Tsimlyansk (on the Don)	6,900	9.6	cyprinids, perch and sander
Other areas	26,400	36.7	
Total	72,000	100	

In the past, sturgeon has been an important catch in the basin of the Sea of Azov and the Caspian Sea, and in Siberian Rivers and the Amur River. Currently, sturgeon stocks are heavily depleted and under constant pressure from poaching. Inland fisheries are regulated by the Law on Fisheries discussed above. However, few provisions refer specifically to inland fisheries, although there are specific regulations for same catchments and river systems. These regulations specify closed areas, seasonal closures, gear restrictions, minimum mesh sizes and minimum catch size.

=== Fishing fleet ===
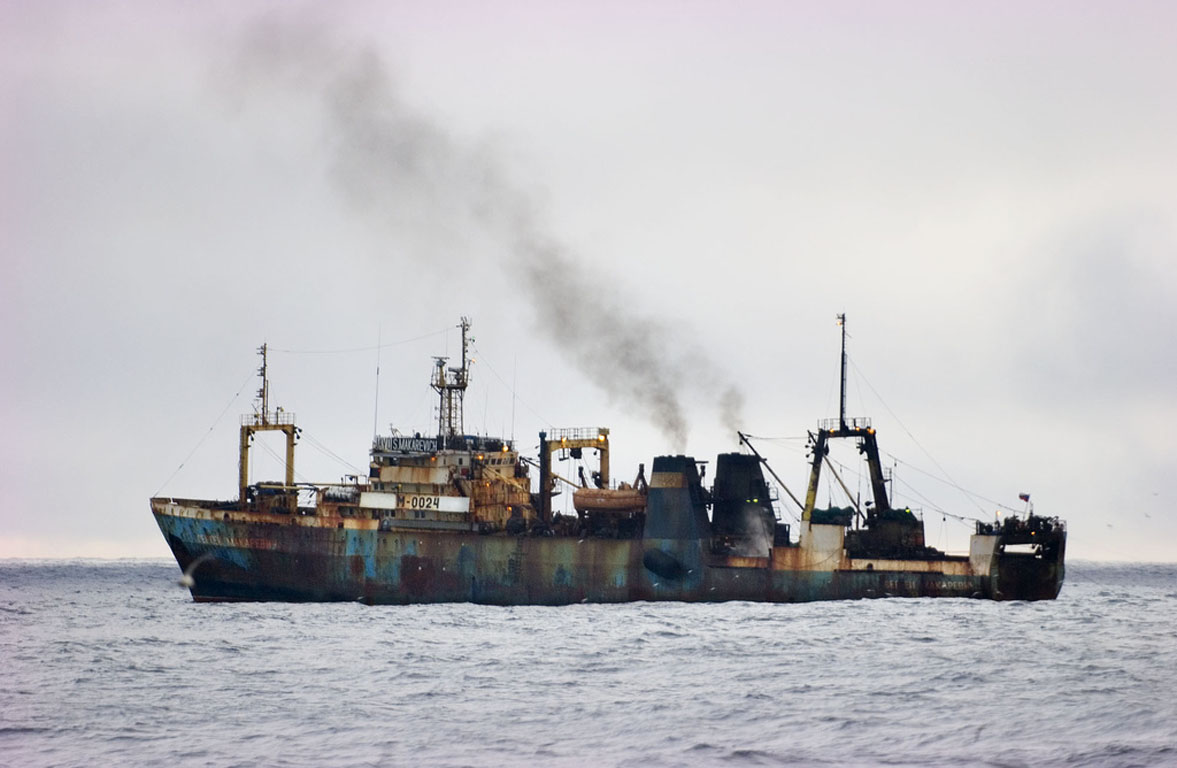
The Russian fishing trawler Sergey Makarevich in the North Atlantic.

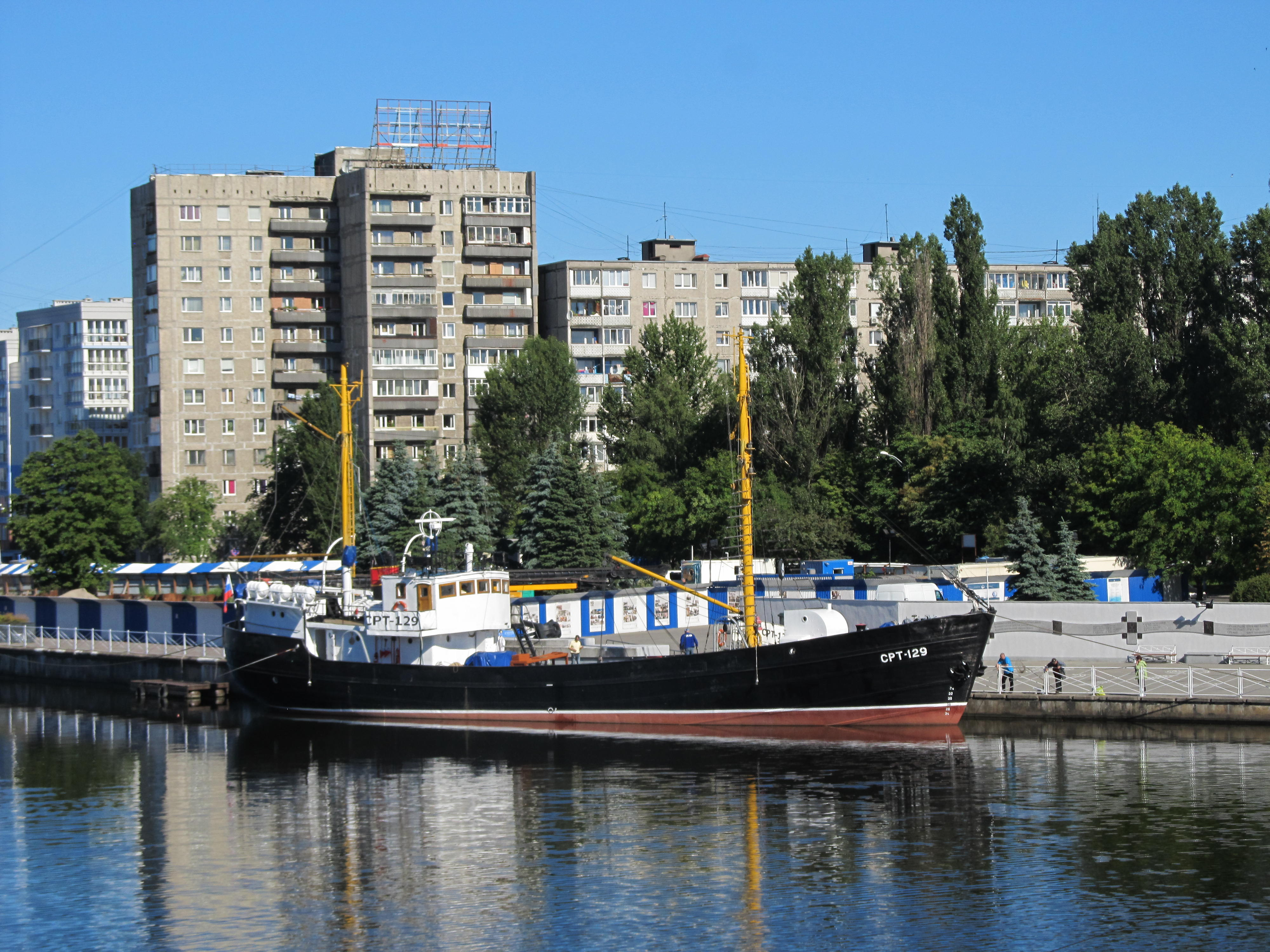
The Russian midwater fishing trawler SRT-129 (Museum of the World Ocean in Kaliningrad)

According to the Russian State Marine Register, in 2002, the offshore fishing fleet contained about 2,500 fishing vessels, 366 transport vessels and 46 factory ships. Of the fishing vessels, 17 percent were longer than 64 metres (o/a), half were between 34 and 64 metres, and one-third were between 24 and 34 metres. Smaller boats are registered with the State Inspection of Small Size Fleet. In 2005, the marine small size fleet contained 2,491 boats, and the inland fleet contained 5,500 motor boats.

Fishing gears used are:

- Midwater trawls – used by processing trawlers and freezing for redfish and Alaska pollock.
- Bottom trawls – restricted use by medium and large sized trawlers, for demersal fishes such as halibut, cod, redfish, flounder.
- Shrimp trawls – used by specialised shrimp trawlers
- Bottom nets – used by small and midsize vessels for flounder, cod and halibut
- Bottom seines – deployed by small vessels for flounder, cod, halibut and other demersal fishes.
- Drift nets – used by midsize vessels, mainly for salmon.
- Bottom longlines – used for halibut, cod and redfish.
- Traps and pots – used by small and midsize vessels for shrimp, crabs and whelks,
- Seines and pound nets – for herring and whitefish
- Dredges – operated from small vessels for clams.
- Small boats – used with salmon kiddles (basketwork traps), and for skindivers harvesting scallops, sea urchins, kelp and sea cucumbers.

An important issue is the age of the Russian fishing fleet. About two-thirds of the fishing vessels do not conform to safety norms. Compared to 1990, by 2000 capital investment in the industry had decreased thirty percent and the number of specialists qualified in fishing, navigation and processing technologies had decreased 30 to 40 percent. The Barents Sea cod fishery is an example of the dominance of elderly and ineffective vessels. Between 2002 and 2005, forty percent of effort in the demersal fishery was by elderly freezing trawlers, which produced only twenty-five percent of the official catch. That is, they were 1.5 times less effective than the other vessels in the fleet. Equivalent modern trawlers are three to four times as effective. The low efficiencies of these elderly vessels also implicates them in involvements with IUU catch.

=== Decline of stocks ===
According to the FAO, important stocks have declined as the result of:

- natural fluctuations: Pacific pilchard
- a combination of natural fluctuations and overfishing: Atlantic and Pacific herring, Alaska pollock, capelin in the Barents Sea
- overfishing and continuing IUU: sturgeons, Atlantic salmon, red king crab, sea cucumber
- a combination of marine pollution and overfishing: whitefish and Atlantic salmon in the Pechora drainage basin, whitefish and sturgeon in the Ob drainage basin, most of the stocks in the Amur Basin
- ecosystem transformation due to the introduction of invasive species: sprat in the Black and the Caspian Seas.

Aggravating factors surround the demand for seafood from East Asian markets, which encourage commercial fishermen to exhaust stocks in Russia's EEZ. Russian illegal exporters have well oiled links to importers in Japan, China and South Korea. Criminal groups and corruption magnifies the effect, as the short distances needed to transport seafood from south Kurils and south Sakhalin to Japan. Huge fish processing developments in China built on cheap labour encourage the export of further unprocessed fish.

== Aquaculture ==
Over sixty species of fish, invertebrates and seaweed are commercially cultivated by aquaculture or fish farming in Russia. Aquaculture is based mainly on buffalo, grass and silver carp, rainbow trout, scallops, mussels and laminaria. In 2007 there were 300 aquaculture enterprises.

Aquaculture can be freshwater or marine (mariculture):

- Freshwater aquaculture – occurs northwest of European Russia where a lot of trout are farmed, in the Far East, and south of Siberia. Production 2003 to 2006 was about 100,000 tonnes.
- Mariculture – occurs mainly in Primorye Province on the coast of the Sea of Japan. In 2006, marine farms in Primorye covered 10,000 hectares, which produces 1,340 tonnes, mainly of Laminaria, blue mussel and the scallop Mizuhopecten yessoensis.

Potential development areas for freshwater aquaculture include 960,000 hectares of agricultural water bodies, 143,000 hectares of ponds, plus other areas in big lakes and water reservoirs suitable for cage farming. The National Project on Agricultural Sector development (Federal Agency of Fishery, 2006) has set a target for 2020 of 1.4 million tonnes from freshwater aquaculture and 400 thousand tonnes from mariculture. The federal government is considering a subsidy of two-thirds of the credit needed to construct and modernise aquaculture facilities.

== Research ==
In Soviet Union, the Ministry of the Fishing Industry operated numerous research institutes with R&D focus on oceanography, marine biology, fishery management, assessment of fishing resources, the development of fishing gear and fish processing technologies. The ministry had its own research ship which conducted research for the Soviet distant water fisheries.

In the modern Russia, the research institutes, particularly responsible for the research in fisheries science, were coordinated by VNIRO, the central fishery institute in Moscow. In 2007, independent institutes became subordinate branches of VNIRO with different scientific focus. For instance, Saint Petersburg-based GIPRORYBFLOT works in fishing vessels technologies and fish processing, while the VIERH in Moscow does economic research.

== Education ==
By 2007, five technological universities and four professional schools in Russia trained specialists in fisheries. The educational programs included navigation and marine engineering, fishery biology, fish processing, processing machinery, the economics of fisheries, and aquaculture.

The faculties of Geography of Saint Petersburg State University and Moscow State University (MSU), the faculty of Biology of MSU, the Far Eastern National University, Kazan State University and Perm State University considered the most important educational facilities for the fishing industry. Around 120 aquaculture specialists and numerous specialists in fish biology and fishery oceanography graduate each year.

== Industry ==
The fishing industry suffered from the collapse of Soviet Union: the harvest dropped dramatically and only started to recover in the mid-1990s. The reasons for the decline in annual harvest included the decrease in stock due to aggressive Soviet fishing practices, changes in the use of the open sea fishing areas, low effectiveness, and problems in the value chain on the local market, including lack of regulations and unaffordable lending. Due to weak national currency, fishing companies had little incentive to deal with barriers on the local market and prioritized exports with payments in the Western currency.

To modernize the outdated Soviet fishing fleets, many private companies accepted bareboat charter contracts (BBC) with foreign investors, the leasing contracts that locked Russian fishing companies into the delivery of catches to foreign management companies. The number of BBC contracts increased from 1994 onwards. The absence of trade protectionism measures additionally incentivized Russian fishing companies to deliver fish directly to foreign buyers both in the Northwest and the Far East, providing no benefit to the Russian government in terms of taxes or currency. The domestic supply decreased, pushing up prices making Russia a lucrative market for foreign fish companies. From the 1990s to the mid-2000s, the import of fish to Russia increased from 424 thousand tonnes to nearly 1 million tonnes, while domestic supply decreased from 3.3 million tonnes to a record low level of 2.5 million tonnes.

In the 2000s, the Russian authorities addressed the issues of the decreasing volume and value of domestic seafood production and growing dependence on seafood exports. In 2003, the "Concept for Development of the Fishing Industry of the Russian Federation to 2020" was approved by the government. In 2009, the BBC contracts were effectively banned in the Russian exclusive economic zone. The 2010 Food Security Doctrine set the food independence and food security goals and defined the target proportion of seafood exports and imports. According to the document, the domestic fish catch in Russia should account for no less than 80% of the total seafood consumption. The program goals included renewing the fishing fleet and land-based processing industry by introducing the fishery quota. Basically, the government allocated 20% of the total allowable catch for the companies willing to invest in new vessels to be built on domestic shipyards.

By 2019, Norebo (Russian: Норебо), owned by Vitaly Orlov, was the largest fishing holding in Russia. That year, its 16 companies totaled 58,2 billion rubles in revenue. It was the only fishing company on the Forbes list of the largest privately owned companies in Russia.

The other top ten of the largest fishing companies included Hydrostroy (Russian: Гидрострой) owned by the Federation Council member Alexander Verkhovskiy and the associates of Roman Abramovich; SZRK (Russian: СЗРК, Северо-Западный рыболовный консорциум) owned by Gennady Mirgorodsky and Dmitry Ozersky; the companies of Igor Evtushok and Valery Ponomarev; the Russian Fishery Company owned by Gleb Frank; Salmonica owned by Nikita Kozhemyako; the companies of Maksim Petrushin and Sergey Popov; FEST Group (Russian: Группа ФЭСТ) owned by Sergey Prutkov; FOR Group (Russian: Группа ФОР) owned by Ilya Klebanov; and NBAMR (Russian: НБАМР) owned by the ex-governor of Primorsky Krai Sergey Mikhailovich Darkin.

=== Export ===
Despite being one of the key global exporters of fish (specifically, pollock, cod, and herring), Russia has a notable import dependency on salmon. The reasons include the underdeveloped aquaculture, light export regulations, and distorted production and consumption geography: 85% of salmon is harvested in the Far East but consumed elsewhere, and selling fish domestically means dealing with expensive and unpredictable logistics.

== Maps ==
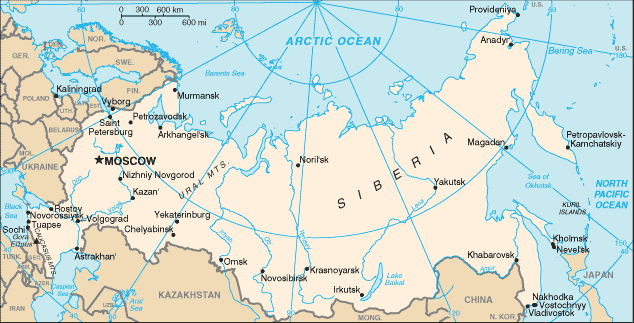
Map of Russia

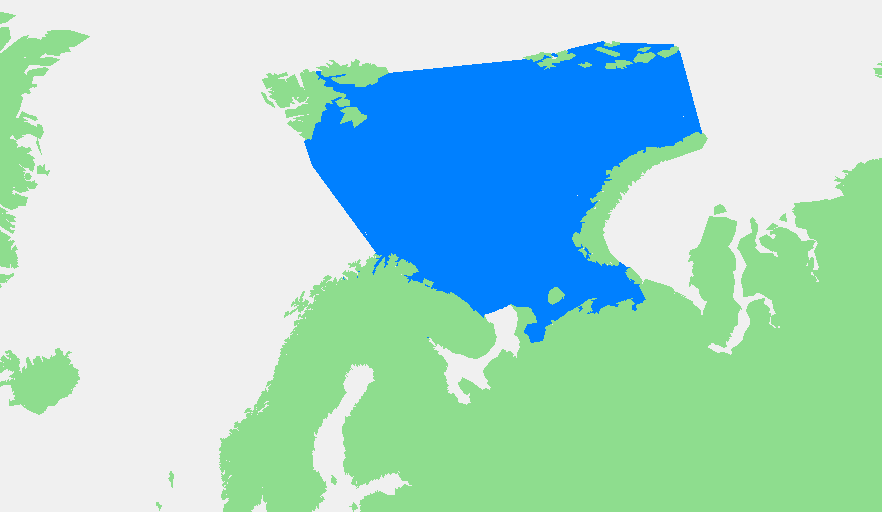
Location of the Barents Sea

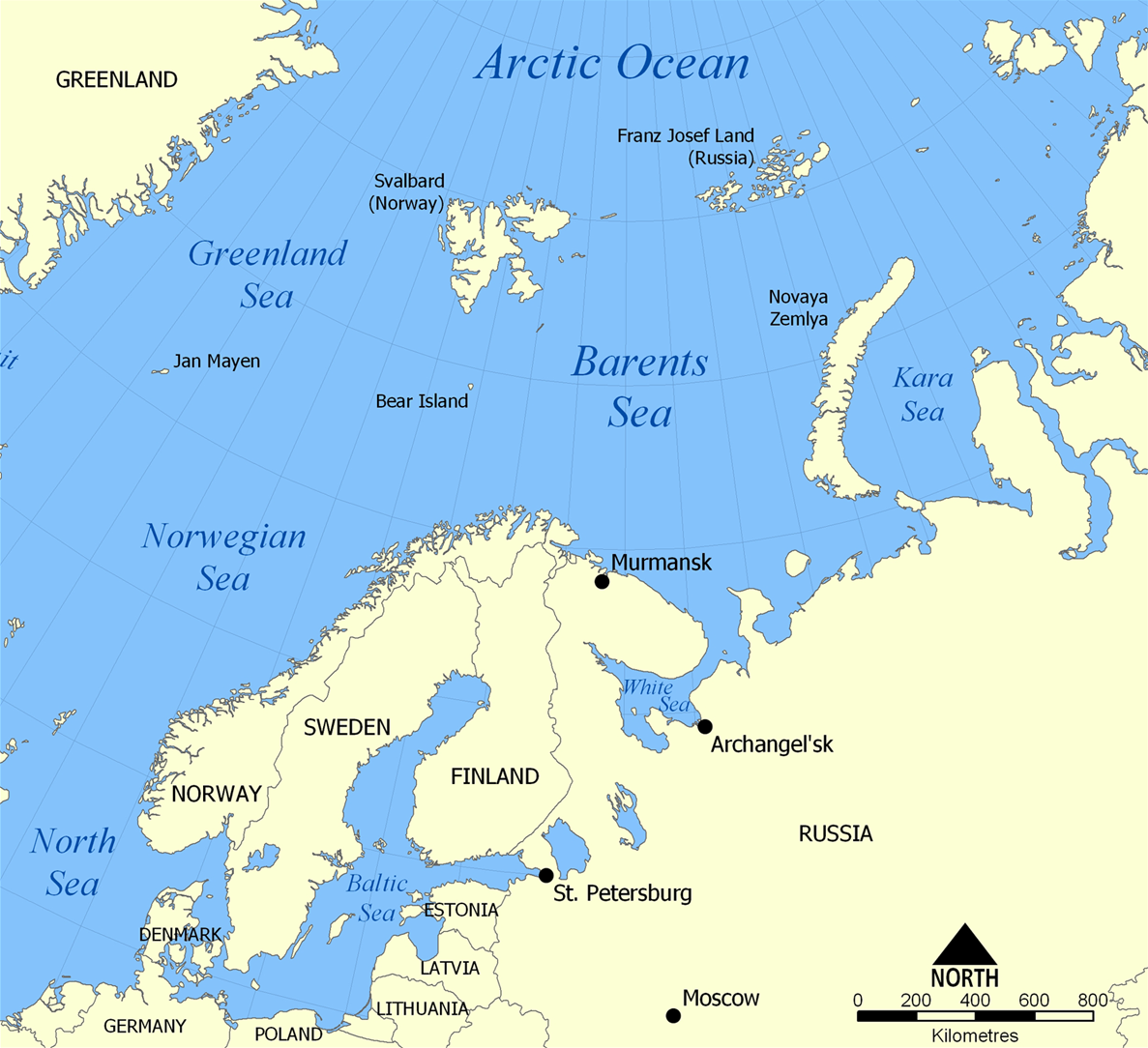
Map of the Barents Sea

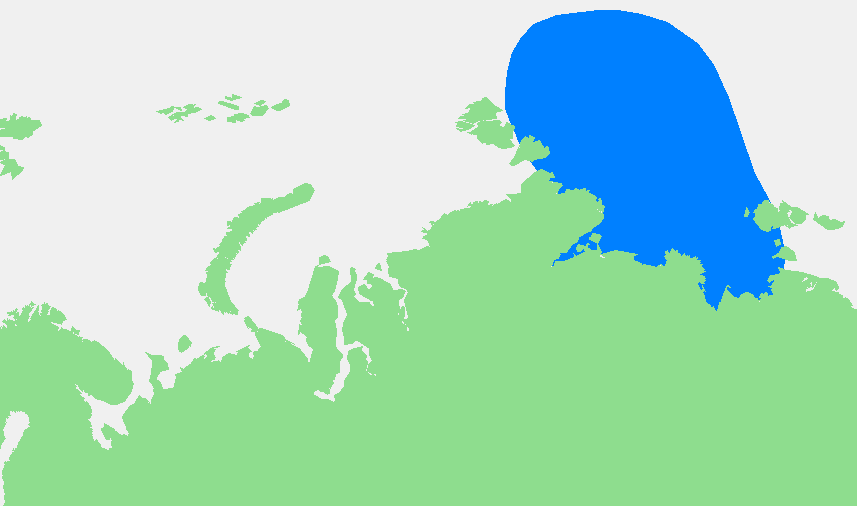
Location of the Laptev Sea

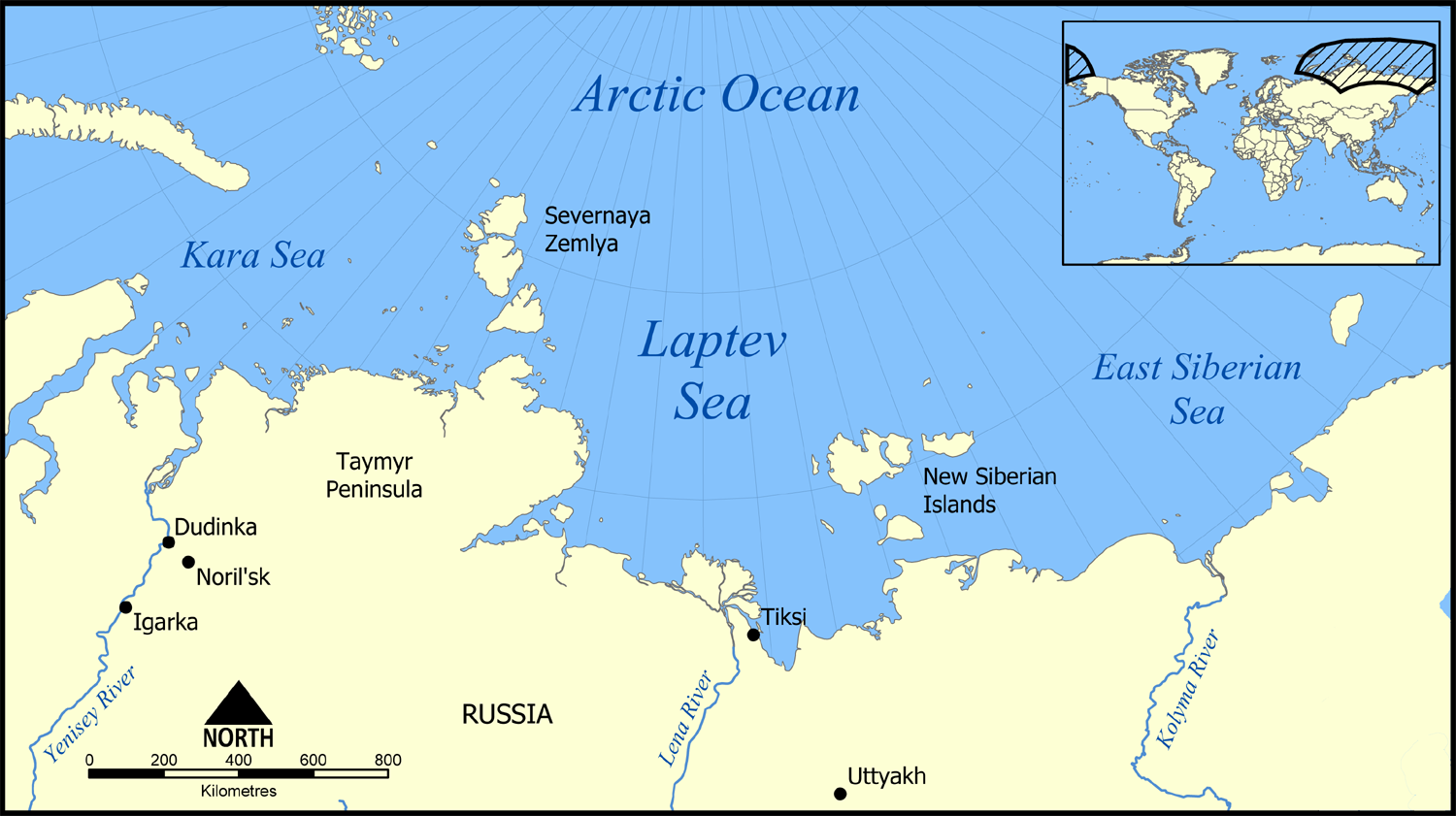
Map of the Laptev Sea

== See also ==
- Agriculture in Russia
- Agriculture in the Russian Empire
- Agriculture in the Soviet Union
- Continental shelf of Russia
- Whaling in the Soviet Union and Russia
