= Gdov Kremlin =

Fort in Gdov, Pskov Oblast, Russia

Coordinates: 58°44′24″N 27°49′12″E

- Gdov, Russia
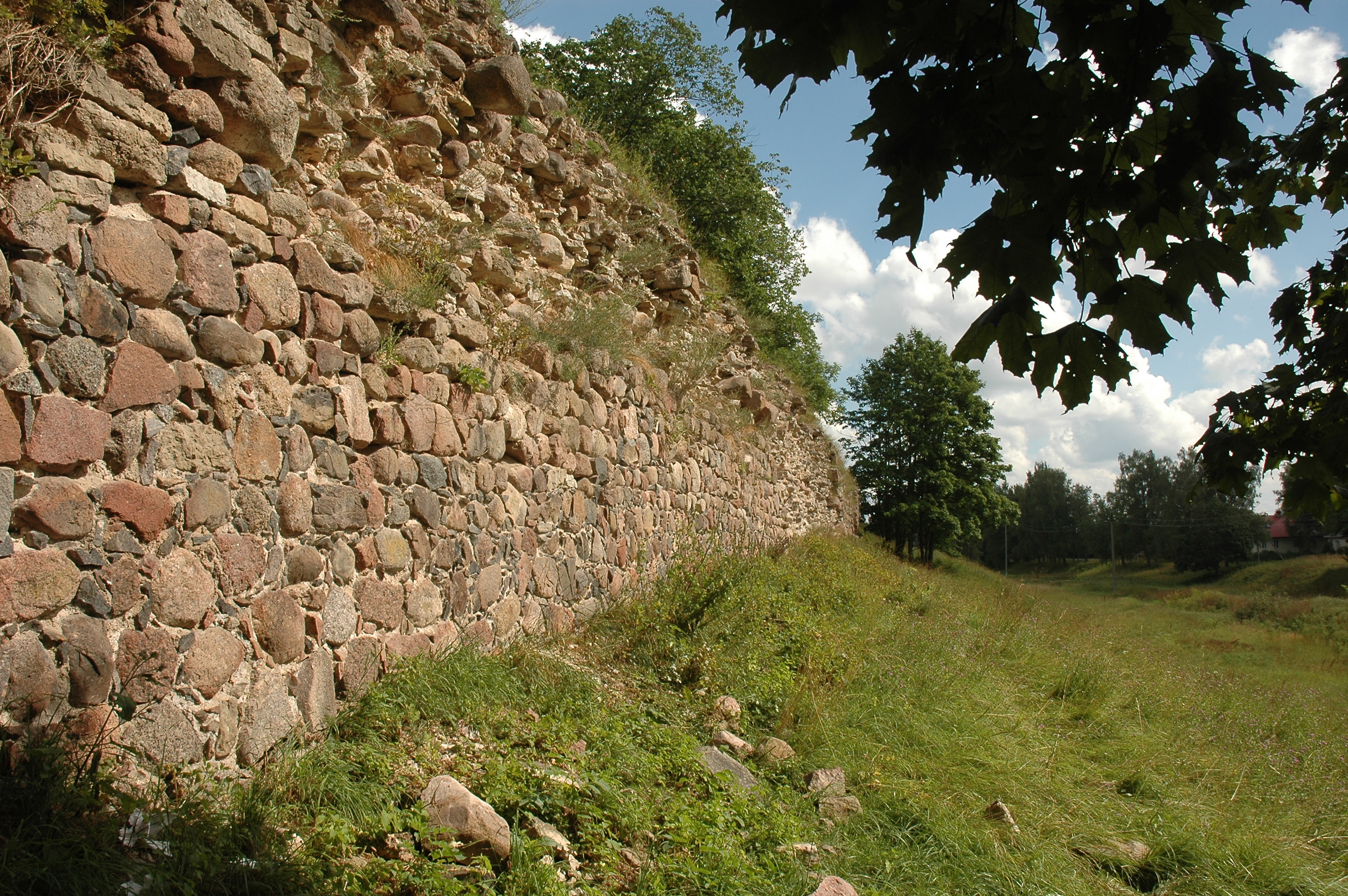
- Ruins of the southern wall of the Gdov Kremlin.

Site information
- Type: Kremlin
- Open to the public: Yes
- Condition: Ruined

Site history
- Built: 1431–1434
- In use: 1431–early 18th century
- Materials: Wood, stone
- Battles/wars: Livonian War; Ingrian War

Garrison information
- Occupants: Sweden (1614–1621)

The Gdov Kremlin (Russian: Гдовский Кремль) is located on a bank of the Gdovka River, overlooking the Russian town of Gdov.

== History ==
=== Origin ===
Gdov was established as an outpost of the Pskov Republic. It occupied a strategically important position, being close to Lake Peipus, separating Livonia and Rus. Located on an important road to Pskov, Gdov protected it from the north. Its first mention in the chronicles dates back to 1323. Initially, the fortress was a mixture of wooden and earthen fortifications. However, the level of protection was deemed insufficient against the rising threat of the German incursion. Construction of a stone Kremlin, initially with wooden elements, commenced in 1431. The walls were constructed of alternating layers of boulders and Devonian sandstone, reaching 4 m in thickness and 8 m in height. The Kremlin had become fully stone-built by the middle of the 15th century.

=== Active service ===
The Kremlin had been attacked on numerous occasions by German, Polish, and Swedish forces. In March 1480, Gdov was attacked by forces of the Livonian Order that burned the posad and laid siege to the Kremlin, attempting to infiltrate it in a few places at the same time. Vastly outnumbered, the Gdov forces had to use every means of defence available to them, from artillery to burning tar and boiling water, successfully preventing the Order from reaching its goal.

The Ingrian War began in 1610, marking the onset of a Swedish invasion. By 1613, the Kremlin was besieged again. The Swedish forces managed to capture it, only to lose control of it later that year. In 1614, another attempt was made, with Gustavus II Adolphus, the King of Sweden personally commanding the operation. The Kremlin fell again remaining under Swedish control until 1621 when a peace treaty was signed under which Gdov was returned to Russia.

During the 17th century, the Kremlin was continuously damaged by siege. It sustained major damage to its stonework; signs of explosions have been identified. In 1657, during the course of another Russo-Swedish War, it withstood a siege laid by eight thousand soldiers led by Magnus Gabriel De la Gardie. In 1686, the Kremlin was severely damaged by fire. By the end of the century, is started to lose its strategic importance.

=== Later years ===
In 1706, Gdov was visited by Tsar Peter the Great. He ordered the walls strengthened by covering them with earth. Currently, the stone towers are also covered by earth, and have been ever since the construction of the town's park took place in the 19th century. Later in the 18th century, when the kremlin had totally fallen into disuse, parts of the walls were taken apart. In 1781, the demolition of the kremlin was temporarily halted by order of Catherine the Great.

In February 1944, the Kremlin was razed almost entirely by the retreating forces of Nazi Germany. All the structures within the Kremlin walls, including a cathedral with a 52 m tall bell tower, churches, and hundreds of merchants' houses were destroyed by explosives; only the walls remained.
