= Kolpina Island =

Island in Russia

Coordinates: 58°02′54″N 27°38′48″E

Kolpina Island Kulkna
- Island
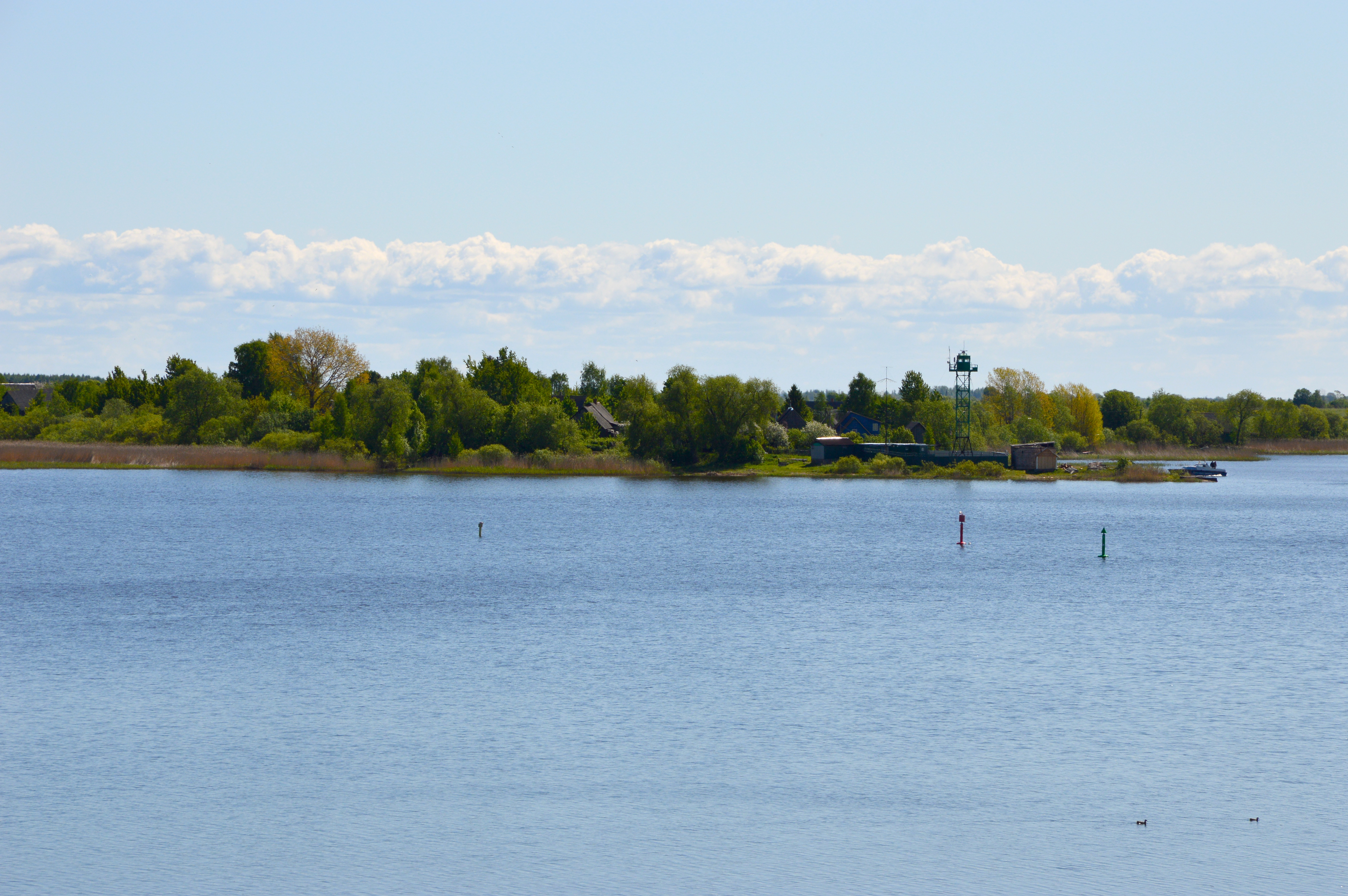
- Kolpino seen from Lüübnitsa, Estonia

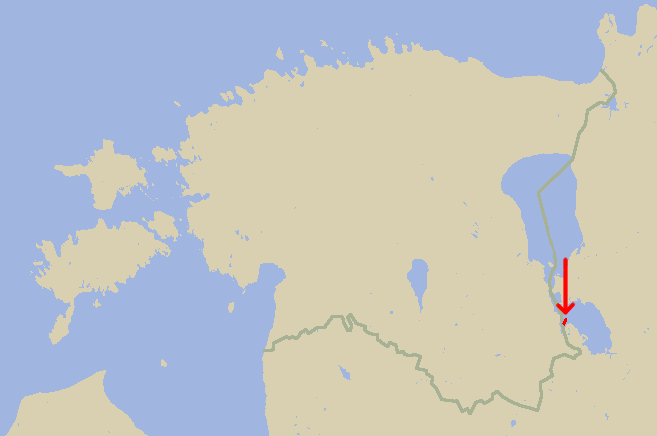
- Country: Russia
- Region: Pskov Oblast
- Municipality: Pechorsky District

Area
  - Total: 11.6 km^{2} (4.5 sq mi)

Kolpina (Russian: Колпинa, Estonian: Kulkna, Seto/Võro: Kulḱna) is the largest island in Lake Pskov (the southern part of Lake Peipus-Pskov). It is part of Pechorsky District, Pskov Oblast, Russia. 1920–1944 it belonged to Estonia and was part of Kulje Parish, Petseri County. After the annexation of Estonia by the Soviet Union in 1940, it went to the Russian SFSR in 1944 and then to Russia.

The island has an area of 11.5 km^{2} (4.4 mi^{2}).

In April 1934, the island was the site of a mass brawl of 150 participants, resulting in 50 injured locals.
