= Gdov =

Town in Pskov Oblast, Russia

Gdov Гдов
- Town
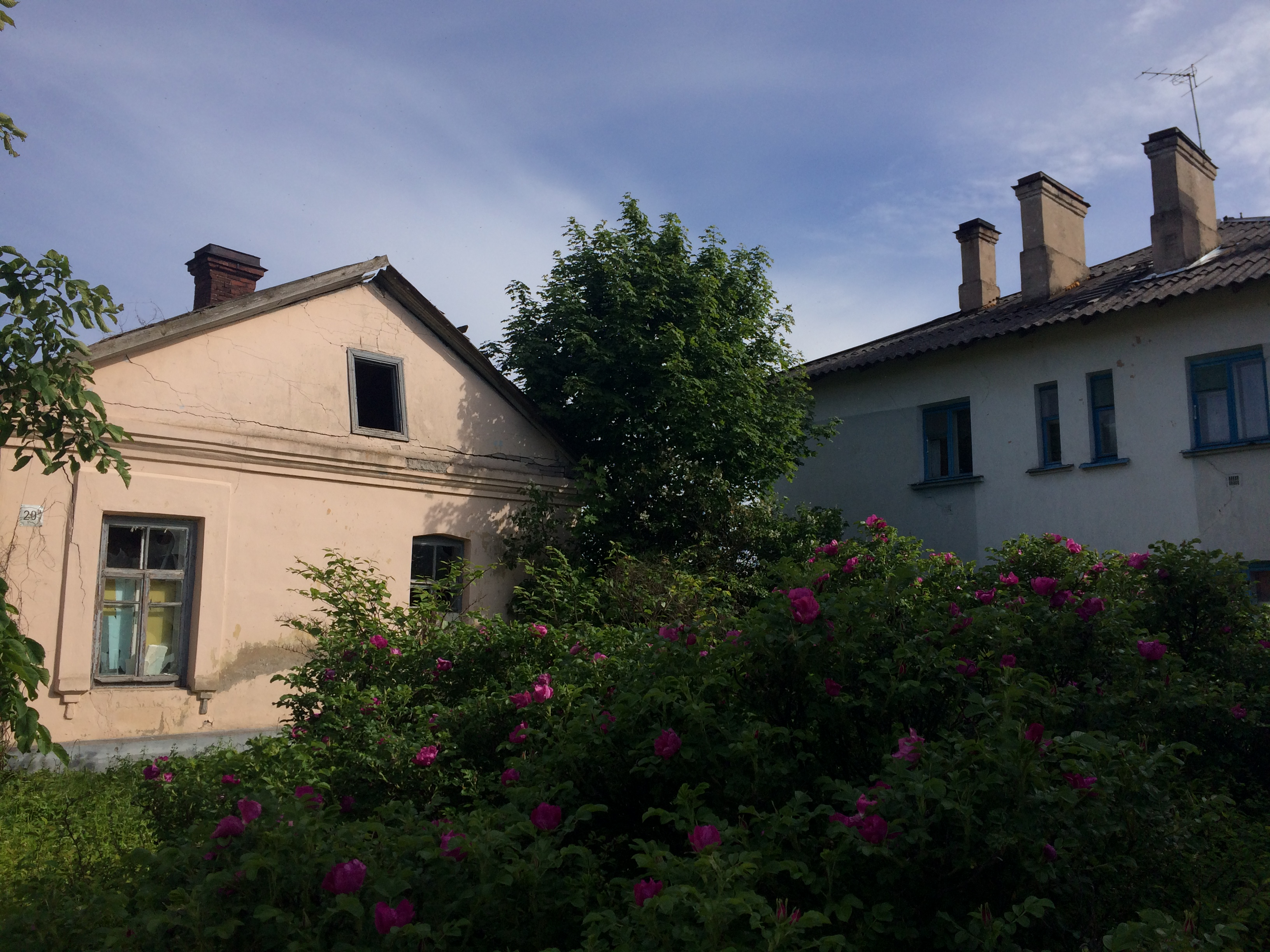

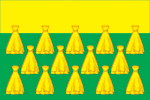
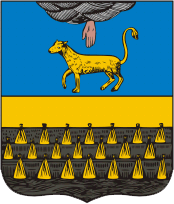
- Flag Coat of arms
- Interactive map of Gdov
- Location of Gdov Gdov (Pskov Oblast)
- Coordinates: 58°44′N 27°50′E
- Country: Russia
- Federal subject: Pskov Oblast
- Administrative district: Gdovsky District
- First mentioned: beginning of the 14th century
- Town status since: 1780
- Elevation: 40 m (130 ft)

Population (2010 Census)
  - Total: 4,379
  - Estimate (2025): 3,194 (−27.1%)

Administrative status
  - Capital of: Gdovsky District

Municipal status
  - Municipal district: Gdovsky Municipal District
  - Urban settlement: Gdov Urban Settlement
  - Capital of: Gdovsky Municipal District, Gdov Urban Settlement
- Time zone: UTC+3 (MSK)
- Postal code: 181600
- Dialing code: +7 81131
- OKTMO ID: 58608101001

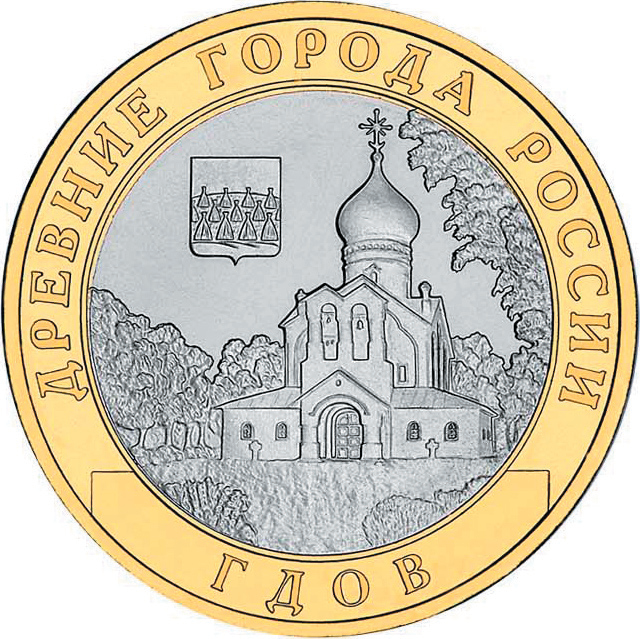
10 rubles (2007). Ancient Towns Of Russia Coin Series

Gdov (Russian: Гдов) is a town and the administrative center of Gdovsky District in Pskov Oblast, Russia, located on the river Gdovka, just 2 kilometers (1.2 mi) from its outflow into Lake Peipus. Population: 3,465 (2021 census); 4,379 (2010 census); 5,171 (2002 census); 6,009 (1989 Soviet census).

== History ==
It was first mentioned in the beginning of the 14th century, as an outpost guarding the city of Pskov. Between 1431 and 1434, Pskovians built a fortress there, the remains of which can still be seen. It was attacked on numerous occasions by the Swedes and the Polish-Lithuanian Commonwealth (e.g., during the Russo–Swedish War (1590–1595) and the Ingrian War), and captured by the Swedes in 1614, but was finally returned to Russia in 1617 according to the Treaty of Stolbovo.

In the course of the administrative reform carried out in 1708 by Peter the Great, Gdov was made a part of Ingermanland Governorate (known since 1710 as Saint Petersburg Governorate). Gdov was mentioned as one of the towns into which the governorate was divided. In 1780, Gdov was granted town status; its coat of arms was granted on May 28, 1781. Between 1874 and 1912, Gdov issued Zemstvo stamps. The first stamp, worth two kopecks, appeared on April 16, 1874. Stamp production ceased, however, with the coming of World War I. In 1919, Gdov was an area where important events of the Russian Civil War and the Estonian War of Independence took place. Originally, the area east of Lake Peipus was under control of the revolutionary government. On May 15, 1919, the detachment under command of Stanisław Bułak-Bałachowicz (subordinate to General Aleksandr Rodzyanko) captured Gdov and the whole uyezd thus came under control by the White Army troops of Nikolai Yudenich. In November 1919, the Red Army recaptured Gdov.

On August 1, 1927, the uyezds and governorates were abolished and Gdovsky District, with the administrative center in Gdov, was established as a part of Luga Okrug of Leningrad Oblast. It included parts of former Gdovsky Uyezd. On July 23, 1930, the okrugs were also abolished and the districts were directly subordinated to the oblast. Between March 22, 1935 and September 19, 1940, Gdovsky District was part of the restored Pskov Okrug of Leningrad Oblast, one of the okrugs abutting the state boundaries of the Soviet Union.

Between July 19, 1941 and February 4, 1944, Gdov was occupied by German troops and Waffen SS units from occupied Estonia. During the war two-thirds of Gdov's population died. The town was seriously damaged during the war; of 640 buildings that existed in 1941, all but 34 were destroyed. Most of the devastation occurred just before the Nazi retreat on January 28, 1944, when the 37th Estonian Police Battalion, part of the 20th Waffen Grenadier Division of the SS, set wooden buildings on fire and used explosives on stone structures. Among the destroyed historical buildings was the unique ensemble of two 15th and 16th-century churches that survived the Bolshevik anti-religion campaigns.

On August 23, 1944, the district was transferred to the newly established Pskov Oblast. The town was reconstructed during the 1950s and 1960s and continued to expand until the economic and demographic collapse of the early 1990s. In 1993 an exact copy of St. Dmitry Solounskiy church was built at its original location at the Gdov Kremlin, financed exclusively by crowdfunding.

== Administrative and municipal status ==
Within the framework of administrative divisions, Gdov serves as the administrative center of Gdovsky District, to which it is directly subordinate. As a municipal division, the town of Gdov, together with sixty-two rural localities, is incorporated within Gdovsky Municipal District as Gdov Urban Settlement.

== Economy ==
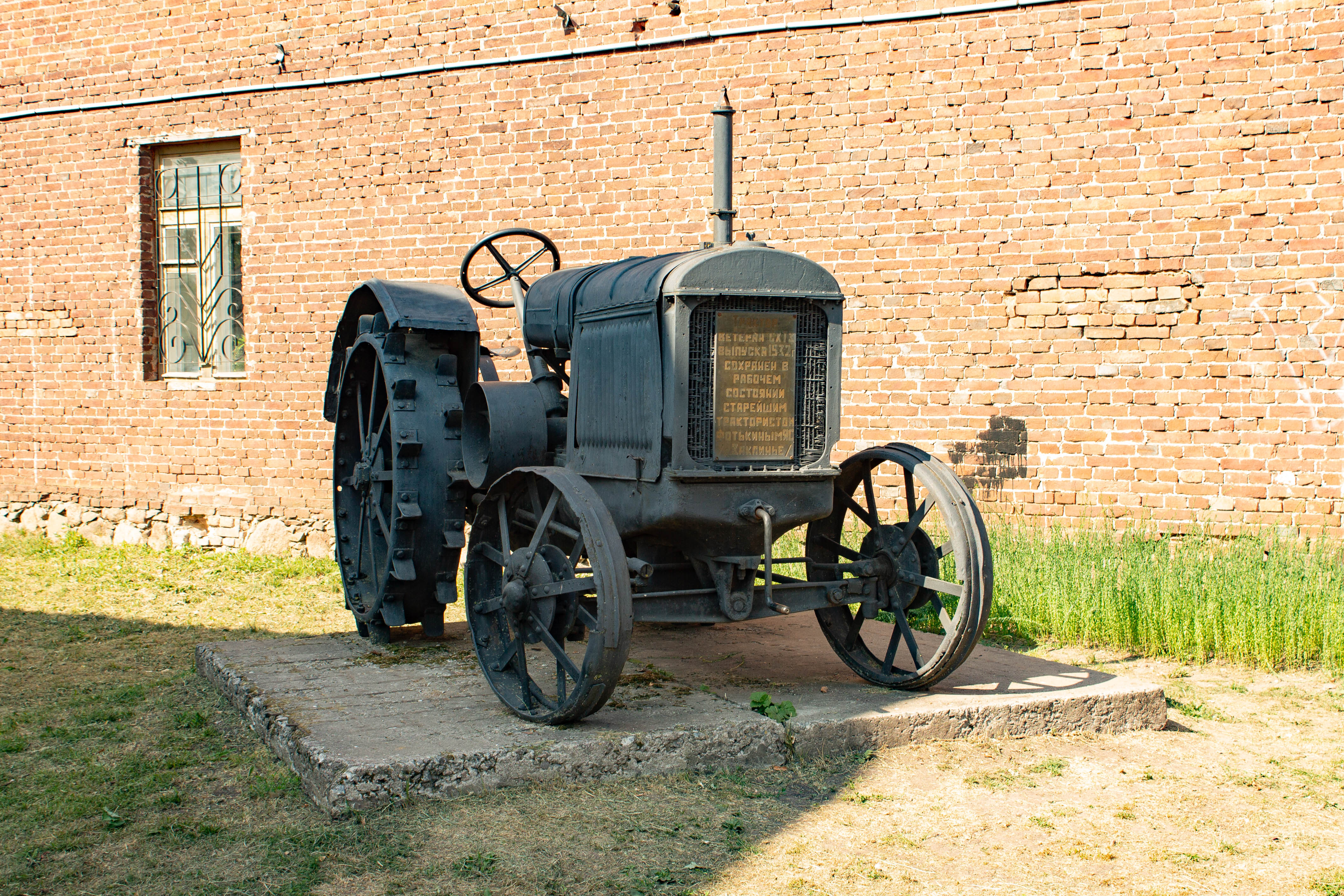
SKhTZ-15/30 tractor as a monument near the local history museum

=== Industry ===
The economy of Gdov is based on the food and timber industries.

=== Transportation ===
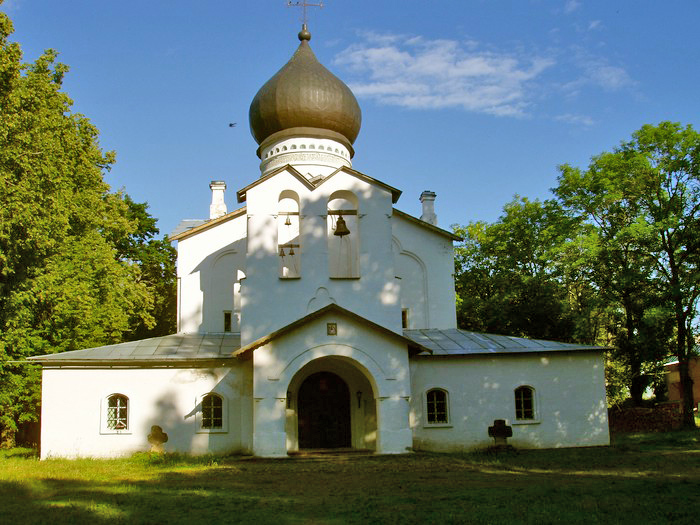
St. Dmitry Solounskiy cathedral in Gdov (1993)

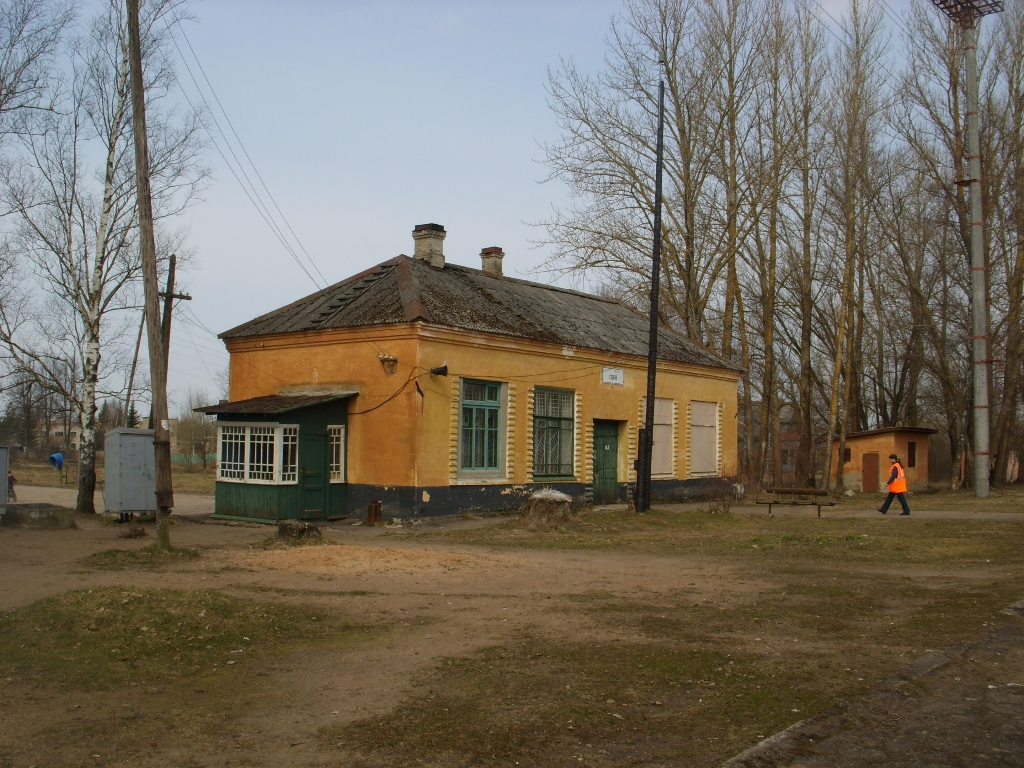
Abandoned Gdov railway station

A railway line via Gdov connecting Narva and Pskov was built before WWI. Later a new line from Gdov to Slantsy and Veimarn was constructed and used for passenger and cargo connections to Leningrad. During WWII the Gdov–Pskov stretch was destroyed, thus making Gdov the terminal station. There was one pair of passenger trains daily servicing the St. Petersburg–Gdov route. In the mid-2010s, passenger traffic between Slantsy and Gdov was discontinued for commercial reasons. The railway between Slantsy and Gdov was deserted and, as of 2021, mainly demolished.

Between the 1950s and 1980s an unpaved airfield in Gdov was used for commuter air transit to the neighbouring towns of Slantsy, Pskov and Tartu aboard an Antonov An-2 passenger biplane.

Gdov is connected by paved roads to Pskov, Kingisepp via Slantsy, and Plyussa. There are daily bus services to Pskov, Slantsy, Saint Petersburg, and neighbouring villages.

In the mouth of the Gdovka there is a harbour for fishing and leisure boats. However, due to the lack of customs and border guard offices, sailing to Estonia is not possible.

=== Military installations ===
During World War II Gdov briefly hosted the headquarters of the Chudskoye Lake Flotilla (1941).

The Russian Airforce base Smuravyevo, now abandoned, was located northeast of the town.

== Restricted access ==
Gdov is included in the border security zone, intended to protect the borders of Russia from unwanted activity. Visits to the zone or transit through it are subject to the Frontier Regime Regulations set by the FSB that stipulate cases where permits are required or where holding a passport is enough. Permits may be obtained electronically via e-mail, four weeks ahead of the planned journey.

== Culture ==
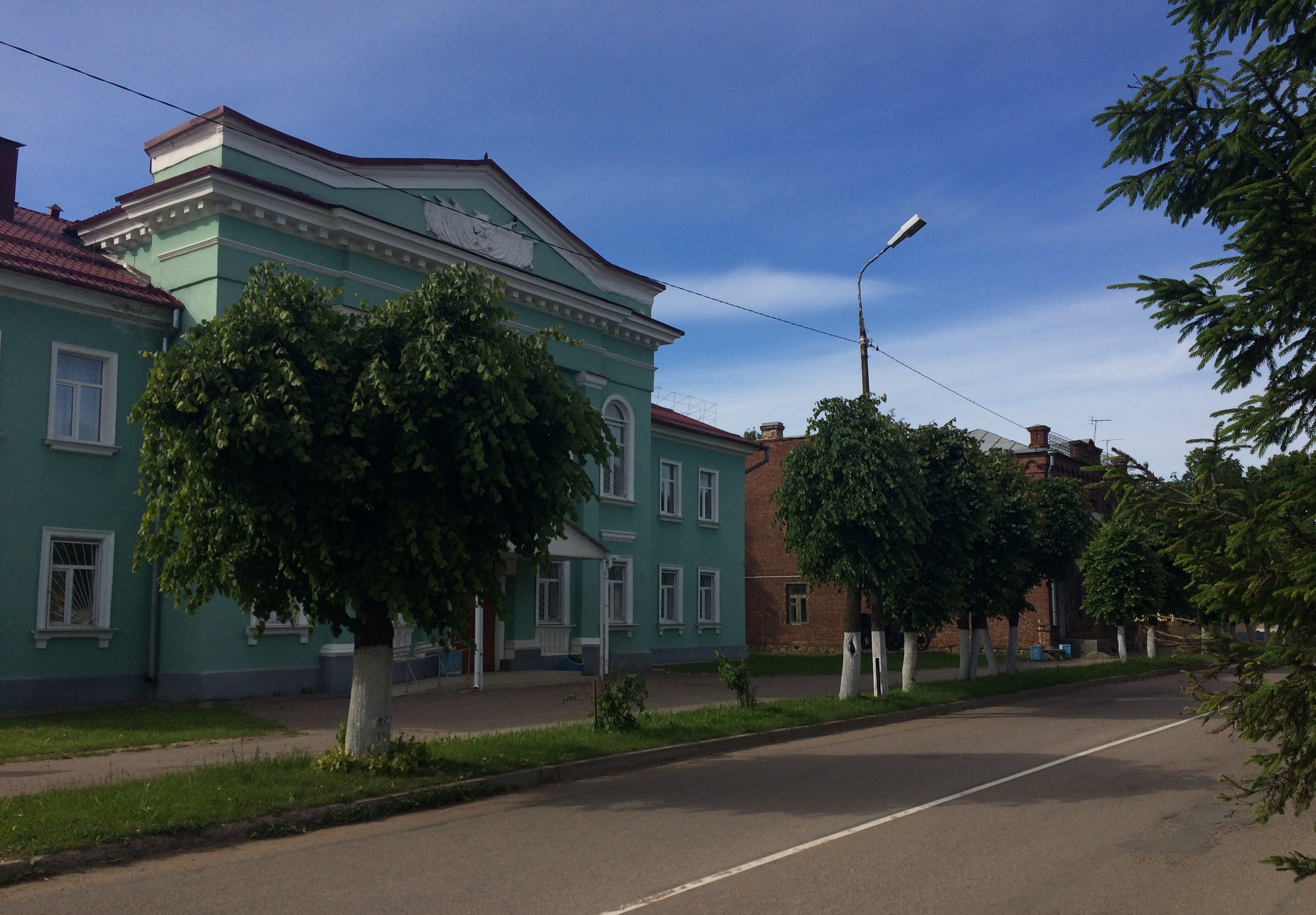
Karl Marx street, Gdov downtown

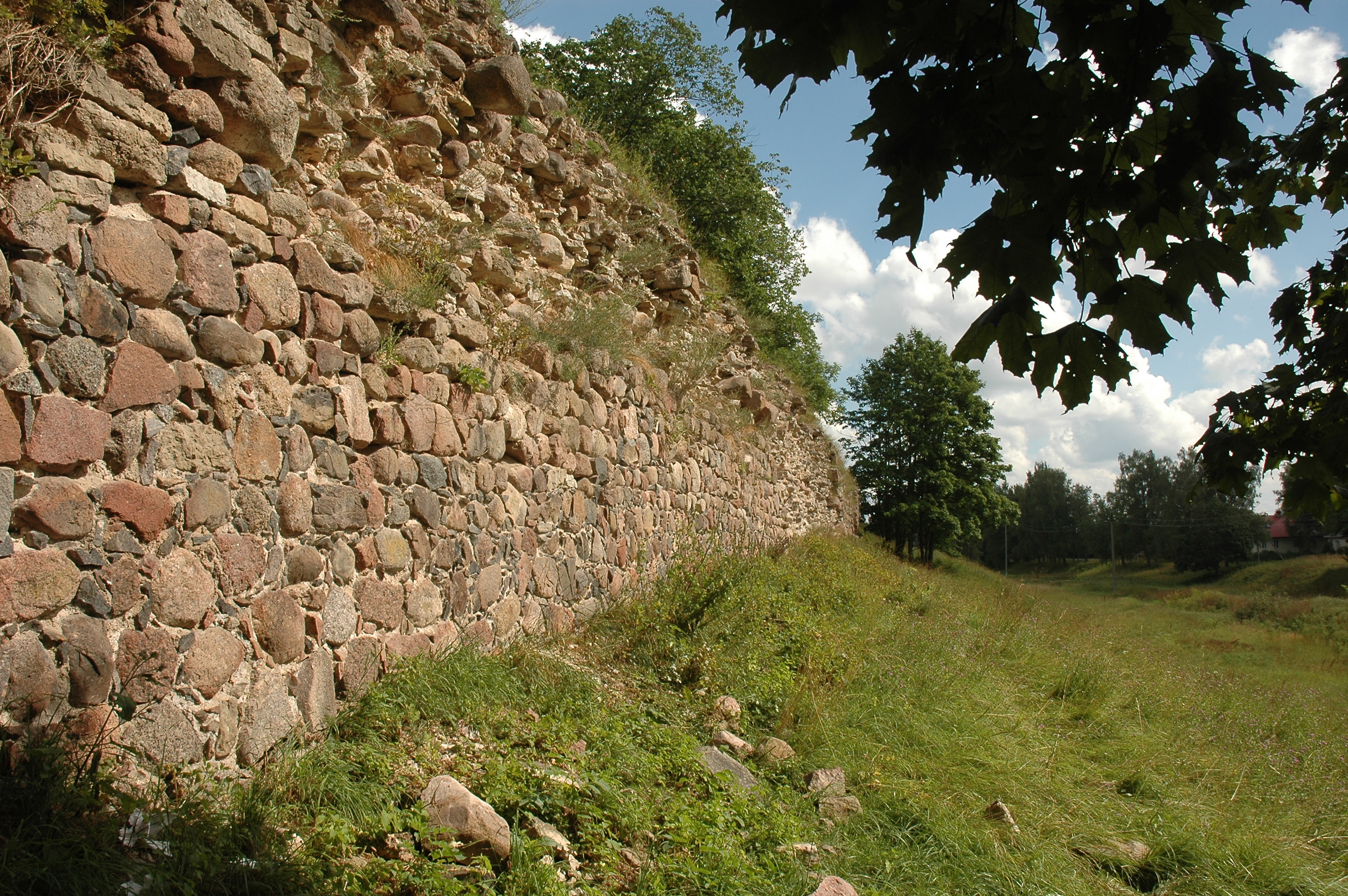
The wall of the Gdov Kremlin

Gdov contains two cultural heritage monuments of federal significance and additionally twelve objects classified as cultural and historical heritage of local significance. The federal monuments are archaeological sites. Gdov has a kremlin, an ancient fortress built in the 14th century. Only fragments of the original fortress walls have survived. The St. Dimitry Solounskiy Cathedral was destroyed in 1944 and reconstructed in 1993.

The only state museum in the district is the Gdov Museum of Regional History. It was founded in 1919, destroyed during the German occupation of Gdov, and rebuilt after World War II. The museum hosts historical and local interest collections.

== Notable people ==
- Dmitri Iosifovich Ivanovsky (1864–1920; alternative spelling Dmitrii or Dmitry Iwanowski (Russian: Дми́трий Ио́сифович Ивано́вский), Russian botanist, co-discoverer of viruses (1892) and one of the founders of virology.
