= Avijõgi =

River in Estonia

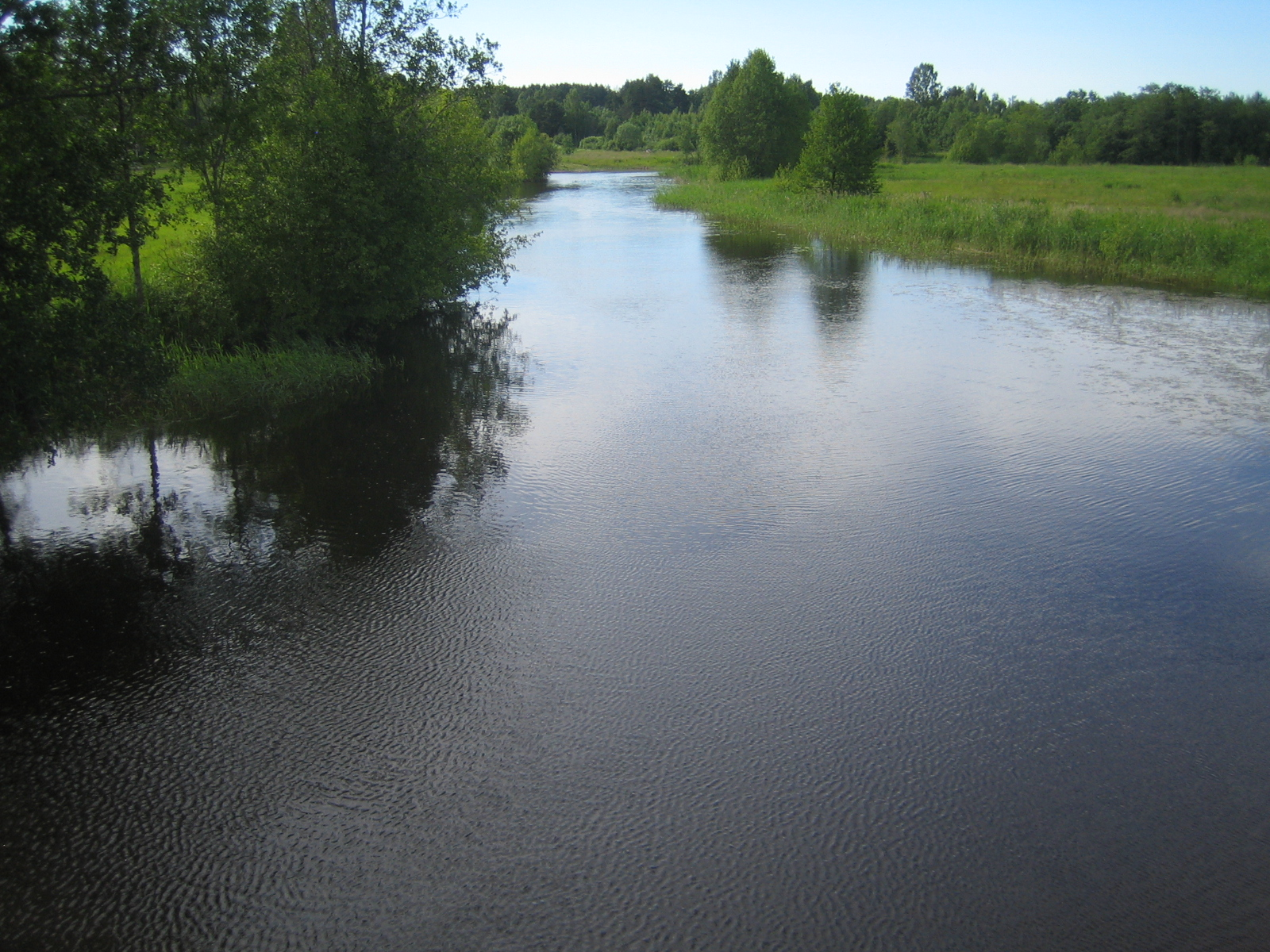

Location
- Country: Estonia

Physical characteristics
- Mouth: Lake Peipus
  - location: Lohusuu
  - coordinates: 58°56′27″N 27°03′21″E
- Length: 62.2 km
- Basin size: 391 km²

The Avijõgi is a river in Jõgeva and Lääne-Viru County, Estonia. The river is 62.2 km long and basin size is 391 km^{2}. It empties into Lake Peipus.

Trout and grayling live in the river.
