= Food Security Doctrine (Russia) =

Agricultural policy of Russia

The Food Security Doctrine (Russian: Доктрины продовольственной безопасности Российской Федерации) is an agricultural policy of the Russian Federation adopted first in 2010, and revised latest in 2020.

== History ==
The first draft of a comprehensive national food security policy was created by the Russian Ministry of Agriculture in the 1990s, which however met strong resistance from other economic ministries and was vetoed by then president Boris Yeltsin due to budgetary limitations. In 2006, Russia adopted the Federal Law on the Development of Agriculture (Russian: ФЕДЕРАЛЬНЫЙ ЗАКОН 29 декабря 2006 г. N 264-ФЗ "О развитии сельского хозяйства") which was the first legal document that provided basis for supporting agricultural production.

== 2010 first version ==
On January 21, 2010, then Russian president Dmitry Medvedev signed Russia's first Food Security Doctrine, which is a non-legislative framework document that outlines the agricultural production goals in order to achieve domestic food self-sufficiency. The doctrine is referred to by the National Security Strategy of the Russian Federation to 2020.

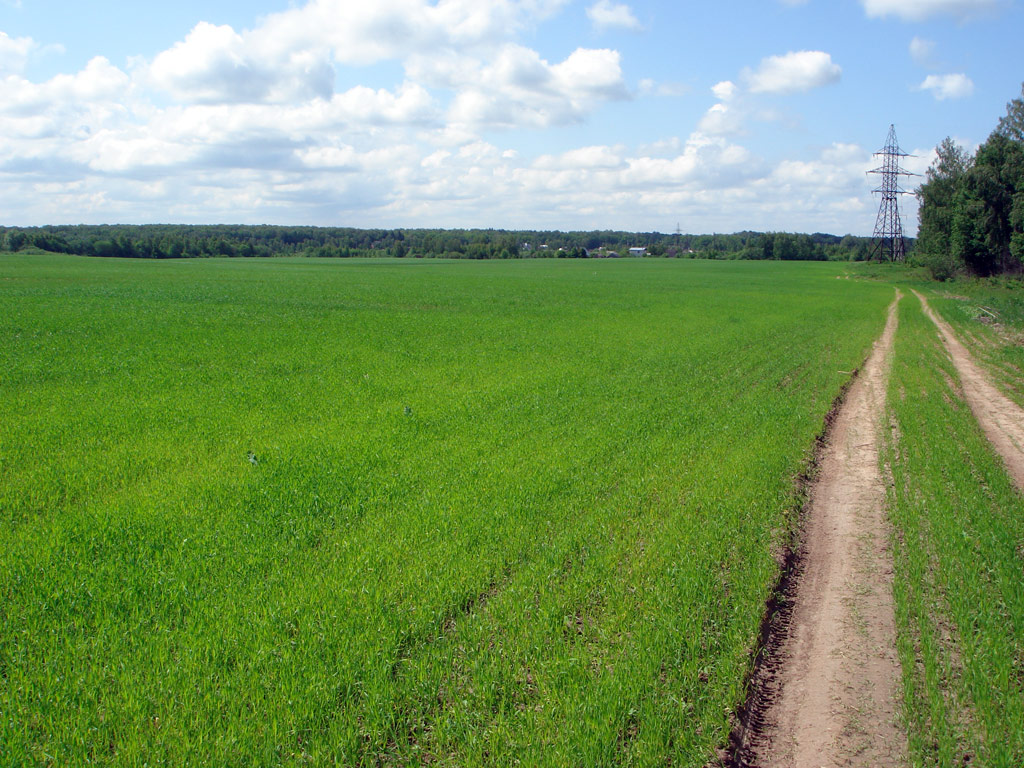
Wheat field near Nizhny Novgorod

The doctrine also justifies governmental actions in response to foreign dumping or export subsidy that are deemed as detrimental to the Russian market. The doctrine has also established the following domestic production goals as the share of domestic production in the total food supplies:

- grain - 95 percent
- sugar - 80 percent
- vegetable oil – 80 percent
- meat and meat products (on meat basis) – 85 percent
- milk and dairy products (on milk basis) – 90 percent
- fish product - 80 percent

However, there is no specific instructions on the timeframe, enforcer or funding for meeting the targets. According to USDA, the doctrine fails to specify any concrete measures to reach the targets which severely limits its effectiveness.

In 2019, then Russian Prime Minister Medvedev stated that most of the goals outlined by the doctrine had been met in the past decade.

== 2020 revised version ==
On January 21, 2020, Russian President Vladimir Putin signed a revised version of Food Security Doctrine for Russia. According to the Russian Ministry of Agriculture, the emergence of new economic conditions such as economic sanctions, Russia's accession to the WTO and enhanced integration processes within the Eurasian Economic Union prompted the revision of the doctrine.

The revised version of the doctrine focused on preventing the import and use of genetically modified organisms for planting or genetically modified animal for being raised. A revised set of production goals were also published as following:

Product	Self-sufficiency target set in 2010	New Self-sufficiency target set in 2020	Actual production level in 2019
Grain	95 percent	95 percent	170.5 percent
Sugar	80 percent	90 percent	112.6 percent
vegetable oil	80 percent	90 percent	198.4 percent
Meat and Meat Products (on meat basis)	85 percent	95 percent	94.6 percent
Milk and Dairy Product (on milk basis)	90 percent	90 percent	81.7 percent
Fish Products (in live weight – raw weight)	80 percent	85 percent	154.5 percent
Potatoes	95 percent	95 percent	100 percent
Vegetables, Melons and Gourds	NA	90 percent	95.8 percent
Fruit and Berries	NA	60 percent	33.9 percent
Seeds of Key Ag Crops of Domestic Selection	NA	75 percent	2-90 percent
Edible salt	85 percent	85 percent	63.6 percent

== See also ==
- Agriculture in Russia
