= Gdovka =

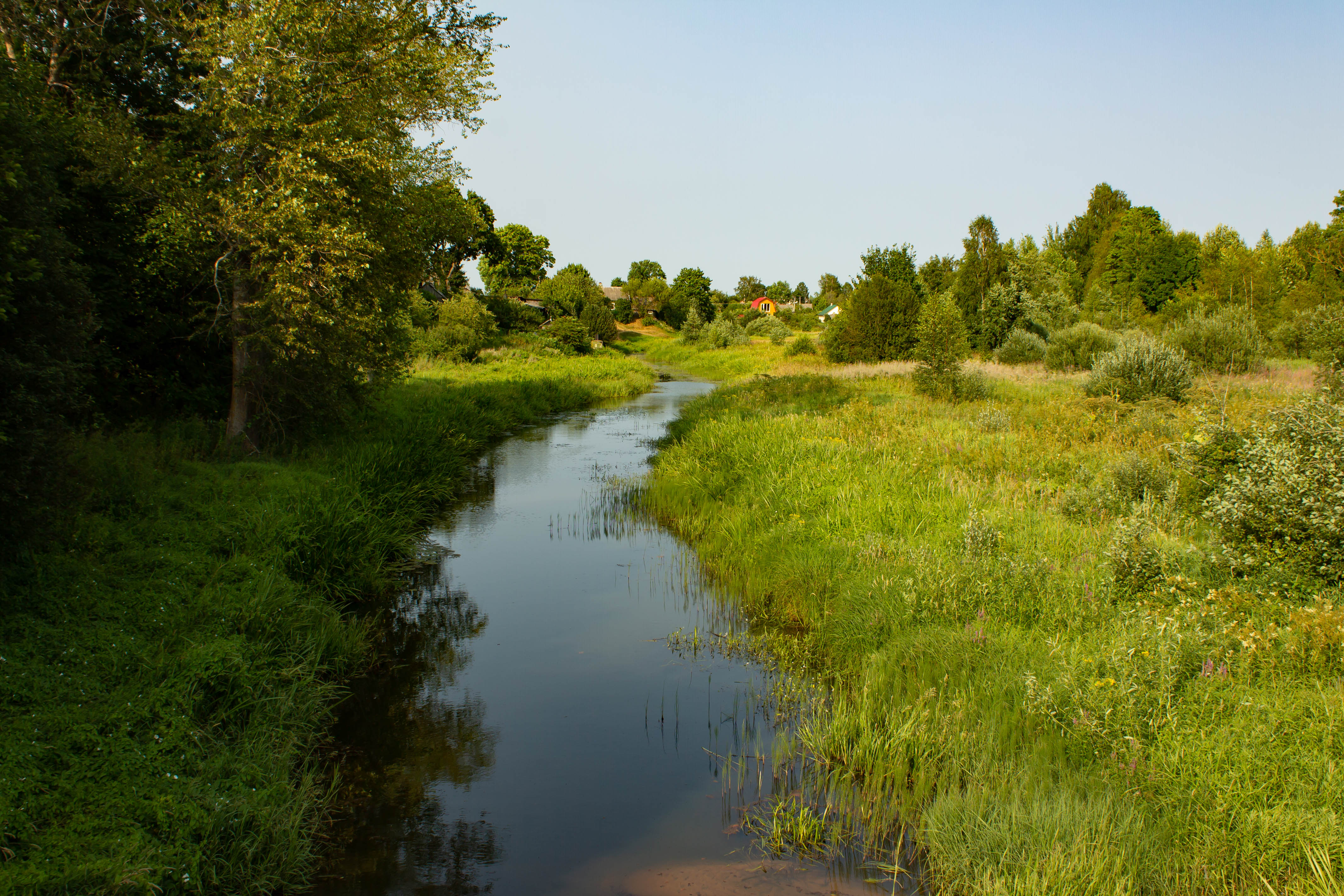

Location
- Country: Russia

Physical characteristics
- Mouth: Lake Peipus
  - coordinates: 58°45′37″N 27°46′48″E
- Length: 23 km (14 mi)
- Basin size: 150 km^{2} (58 sq mi)

Basin features
- Progression: Lake Peipus→ Narva→ Gulf of Finland

The Gdovka (Russian: Гдовка) is a river in Gdovsky District of Pskov Oblast, Russia. The source of the river is the Pyosy Mokh swamp. The Gdovka is a tributary of Lake Peipus. It is 23 kilometres (14 mi) long and has a drainage basin of the area of 150 square kilometres (58 mi^{2}). The town of Gdov and the village of Ustye are located on the banks of the Gdovka.
