= Lake Peipus =

Lake on the Estonia-Russia border

- Peipsi-Pihkva järv (Estonian); Чудско-Псковское озеро (Russian)
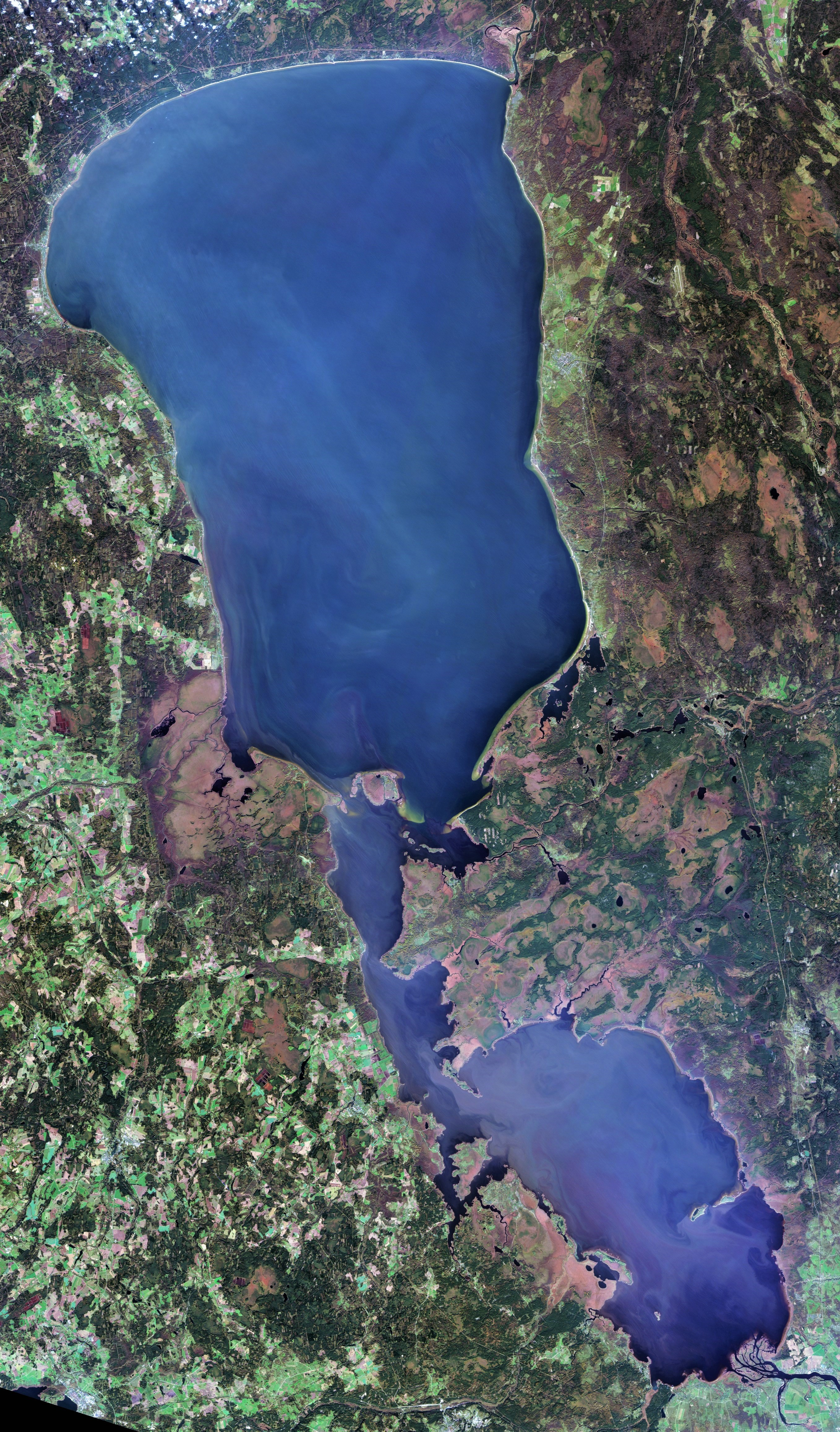
- Landsat 8 satellite photo

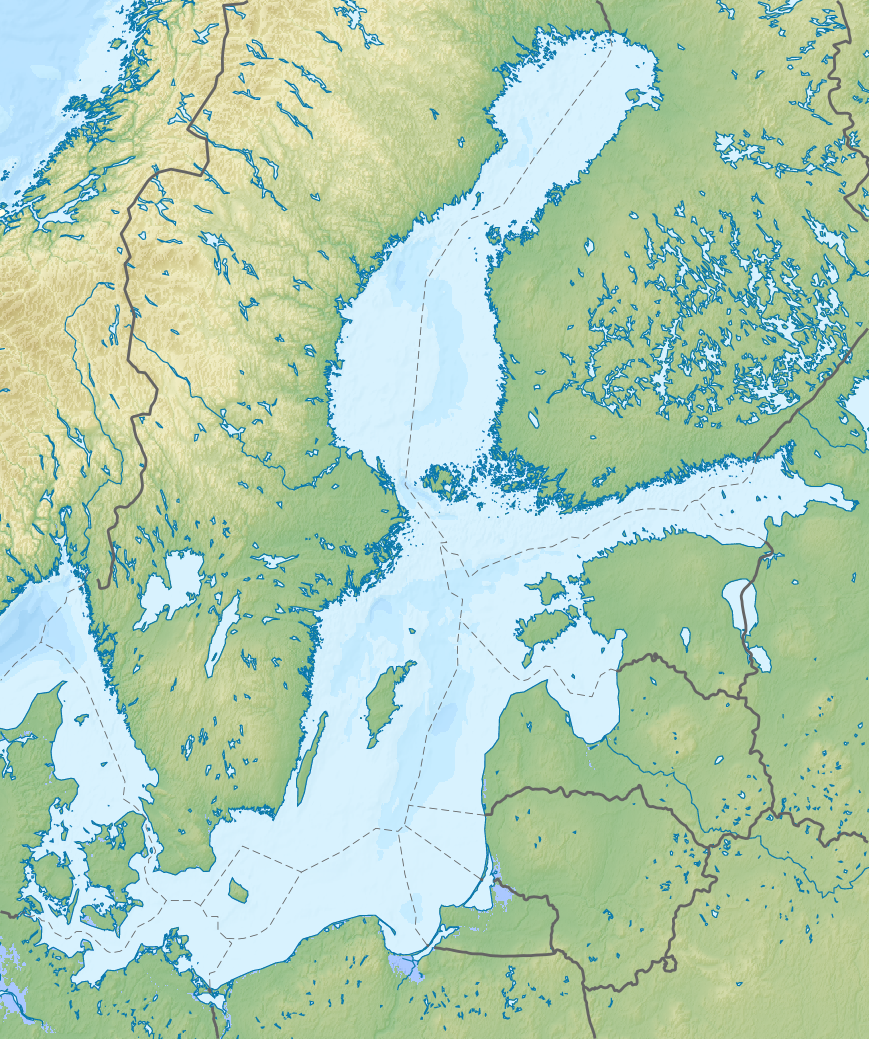
- Location within Europe Location within Baltic Sea region Location within Estonia Location within European Russia
- Location: Estonia, Russia
- Coordinates: 58°41′N 27°29′E
- Primary inflows: Velikaya, Emajõgi, Avijõgi
- Primary outflows: Narva
- Catchment area: 47,800 km^{2} (18,500 sq mi)
- Basin countries: Estonia, Latvia, and Russia
- Surface area: 3,555 km^{2} (1,373 sq mi)
- Average depth: 7.1 m (23 ft)
- Max. depth: 15.3 m (50 ft)
- Water volume: 25 km^{3} (6.0 cu mi)
- Shore length^{1}: 520 km (320 mi)
- Surface elevation: 30 m (98 ft)
- Islands: Kamenka, Kolpina, Piirissaar
- Settlements: Kallaste, Mustvee, Gdov
- ^{1} Shore length is not a well-defined measure.

Drone video of Lake Peipus and the town of Mustvee in July 2022

Lake Peipus (/ˈpeɪpʊs/; Estonian: Peipsi-Pihkva järv, IPA: [ˈpei̯psʲi ˈpihkʋɑ ˈjærʋ]; Russian: Чудско-Псковское озеро or Псковско-Чудское озеро) is the largest trans-boundary lake in Europe, lying on the international border between Estonia and Russia.

The lake is the fifth-largest in Europe after Lake Ladoga and Lake Onega (in Russia), Lake Vänern (in Sweden), and Lake Saimaa (in Finland).

It covers 3,555 km^{2} (1,373 sq mi), and it has an average depth of 7.1 m (23 ft), the deepest point being 15 m (49 ft). The lake has several islands and consists of three parts:

- Lake Peipus (Estonian: Peipsi järv, Russian: Чудское озеро), the northern part of the lake, with an area of 2,611 km^{2} (1,008 sq mi) (73%)
- Lake Pskov (Estonian: Pihkva järv, Russian: Псковское озеро), the southern part of the lake (area 708 km^{2} (273 sq mi) or 20%)
- Warm Lake (Estonian: Lämmijärv, Russian: Тёплое озеро), the sound connecting the other two parts of the lake (area 236 km^{2} (91 sq mi) or 7%).

The lake is used for fishing and recreation, but suffered from environmental degradation from Soviet-era agriculture. Some 30 rivers and streams discharge into Lake Peipus, the two largest of which are the Velikaya and Emajõgi. The lake drains into the Gulf of Finland via the Narva River.

On 5 April 1242, the frozen lake was the site of the Battle on the Ice (also known as the Battle of Lake Peipus) between the armies of the Novgorod Republic and the Teutonic Order.

== Name ==
The origin of the name Peipus (Estonian: Peipsi) is uncertain, although it may be paralleled by Peipiä järvi, the Votic name for lake Kopanskoye (Russian: Копанское озеро) and the village of Peypiya (Russian: Пейпия, Votic: Peipiä) along its shore, and by Peipozero (Russian: Пейпозеро) near Onega Bay. Paul Ariste suggested a pre-Finnic origin of the name, Julius Mägiste suggested a connection with peipo or peippu "chaffinch" (or other songbird) or Votic põippõ "chicken", Lauri Kettunen suggested derivation from a personal name, and Rufʹ Aleksandrovna Ageeva suggested a Baltic etymology, comparing it to Latvian piepe and Lithuanian pepis "moisture, mold". The Russian name Chudskoye ozero (Чудское озеро) means "Chud Lake" (i.e., "Estonian Lake"); the ethnonym Chud (чудь) referred to various Finnic peoples in what is now Estonia, Karelia, and northwestern Russia.

== Formation ==
The lake is a remnant of a larger body of water that existed in this area during a former ice age. In the Paleozoic Era, 300 to 400 million years ago, the entire territory of the modern Gulf of Finland was covered by a sea. Its modern relief was formed as a result of glacier activities, the last of which, the Weichselian glaciation, ended about 12,000 years ago.

== Topography and hydrography ==
The banks of Lake Peipus have smooth contours and form only one large bay: Raskopelsky Bay. On the northern and northwestern shores of the lake there are sand dunes covered with pine forest and sandy beaches. Along the sandy shores, there is a 200–300 metres (660–980 ft) wide stretch of shallow waters. The low shores of the lake mostly consist of peat and are bordered by vast lowland and marshes, which are flooded in the spring, with the flooding area reaching up to 1,000 km^{2} (390 sq mi).

Water balance of Lake Peipus
	Water balance	Volume
Inflow	Precipitation	560 mm (1.9 km^{3})
Inflow	Surface and groundwater	3150 mm (11.2 km^{3})
Outflow	Streamflow	3390 mm (12 km^{3})
Outflow	Evaporation	320 mm (1.1 km^{3})

The relief of the bottom is uniform and flat, gradually rising near the shores and covered with silt, and in some places with sand. The deepest point of 15.3 metres (50 ft) is located in Warm Lake, 300 metres (980 ft) from the coast.

The lake is well-flowing, with the annual inflow of water equal to about half of the total water volume.

The lake water is fresh, with a low transparency of about 2.5 metres (8 ft 2 in) due to plankton and suspended sediments caused by the river flow. Water currents are weak 5–9 cm/s (2.0–3.5 in/s); generally induced by wind, so stop when it ceases. However, during the spring flood, there is a constant surface current from north to south.

Because of the shallow depth, the lake quickly warms and cools. Water temperature reaches 25–26 °C (77–79 °F) in July. The lakes freeze in late November to early December, and they thaw in late April to early May, first Warm Lake and Lake Pskov, and then Lake Peipus. However, due to recent climate changes, Lake Peipus has now commonly started to freeze later in December and thaw much earlier in April.

== Gallery ==
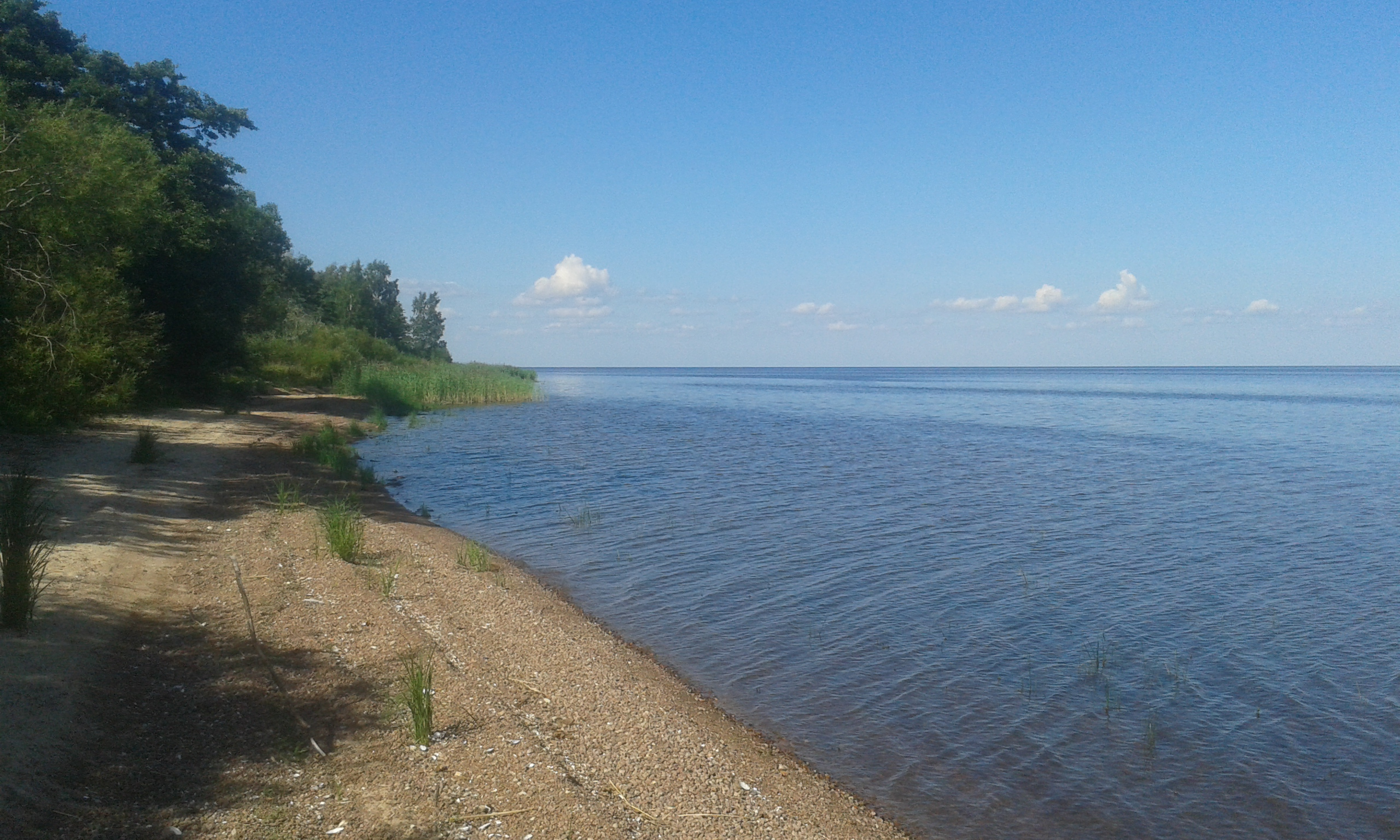
Shoreline, south of Mustvee in Estonia

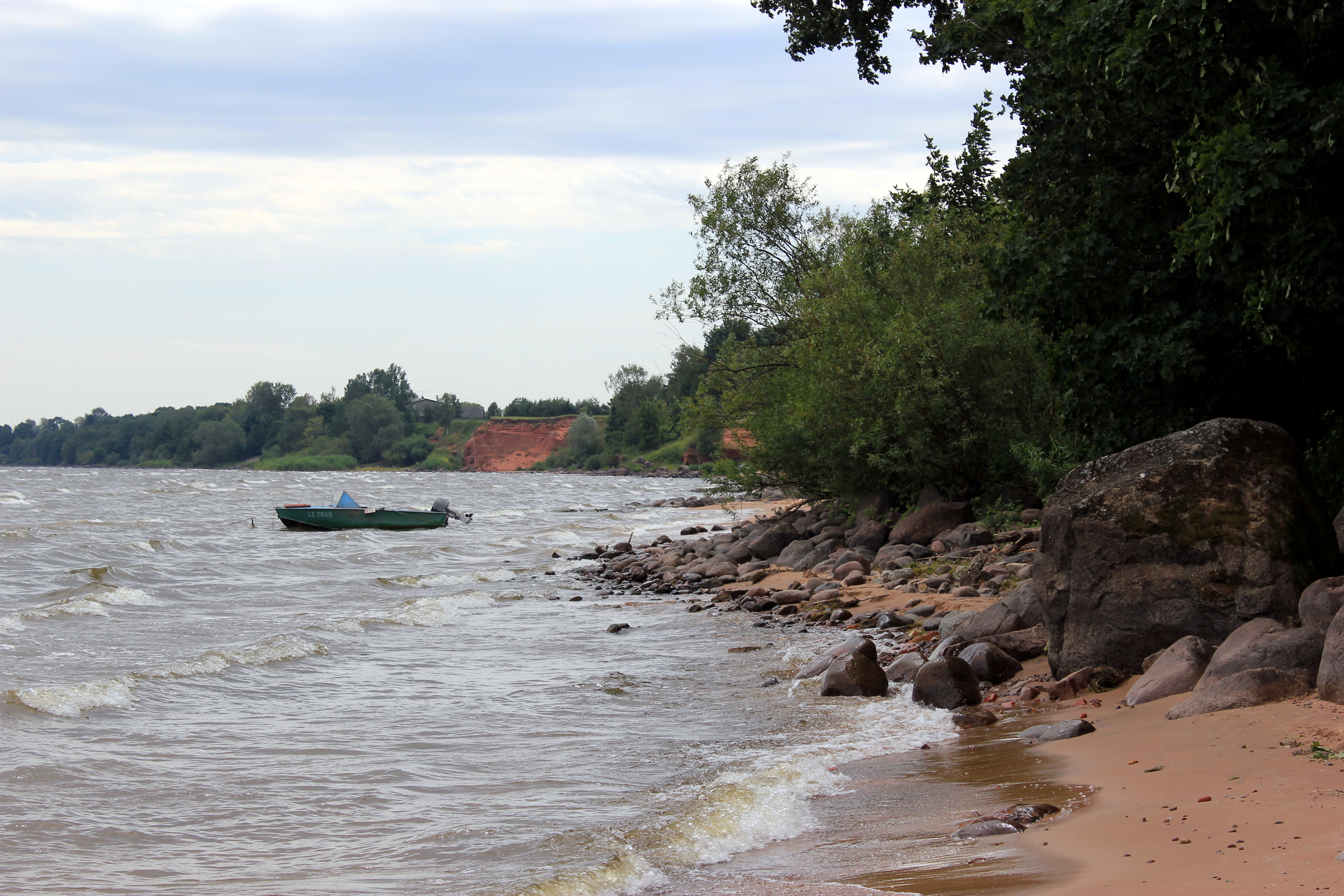
Kallaste

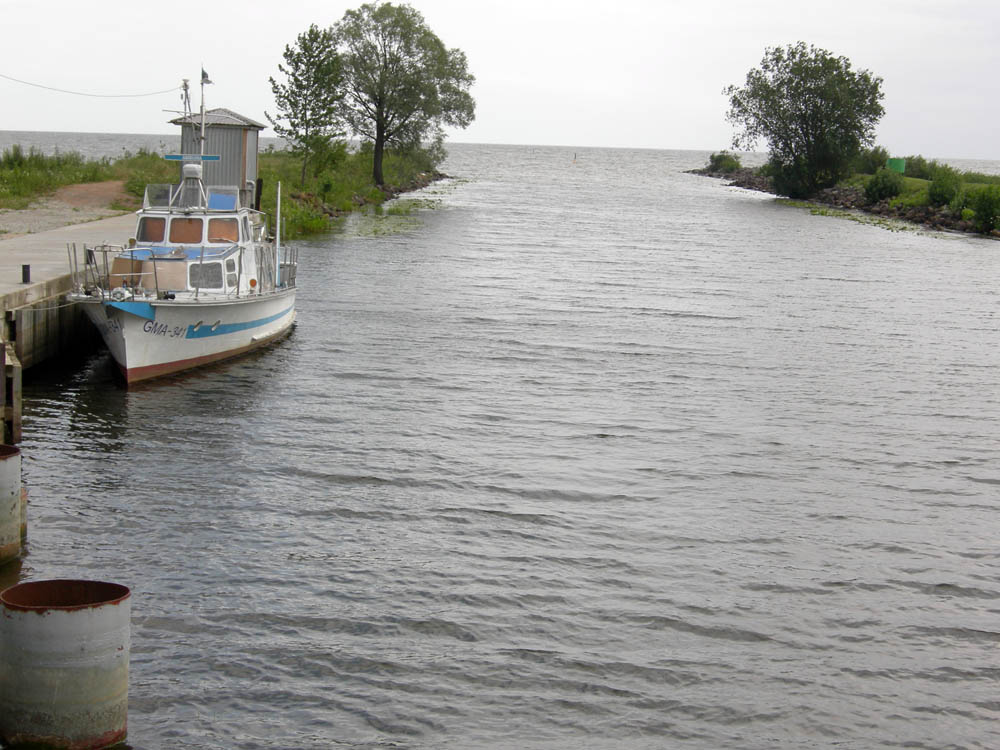
Mustvee harbour

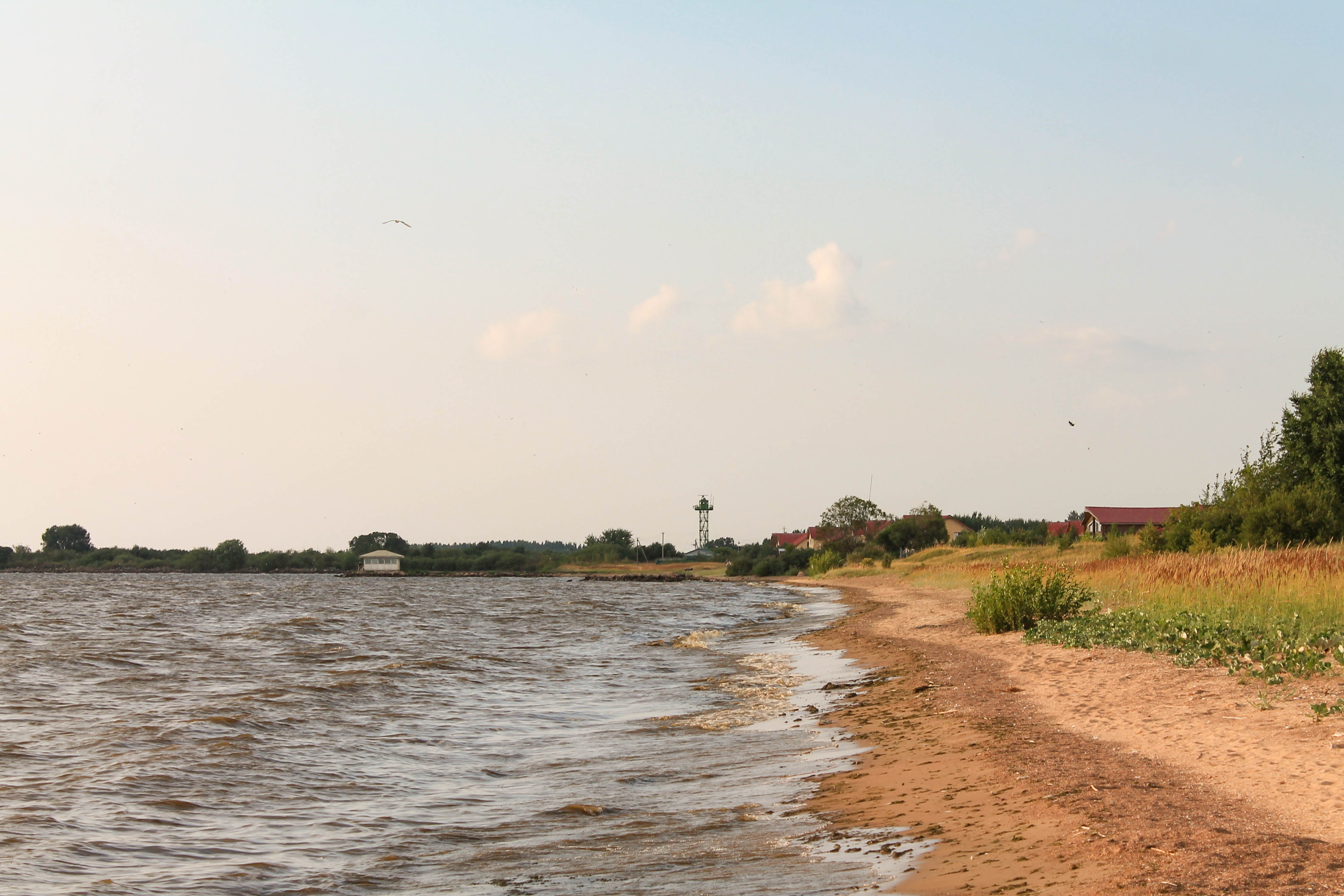
Shoreline in Russia, near Gdov

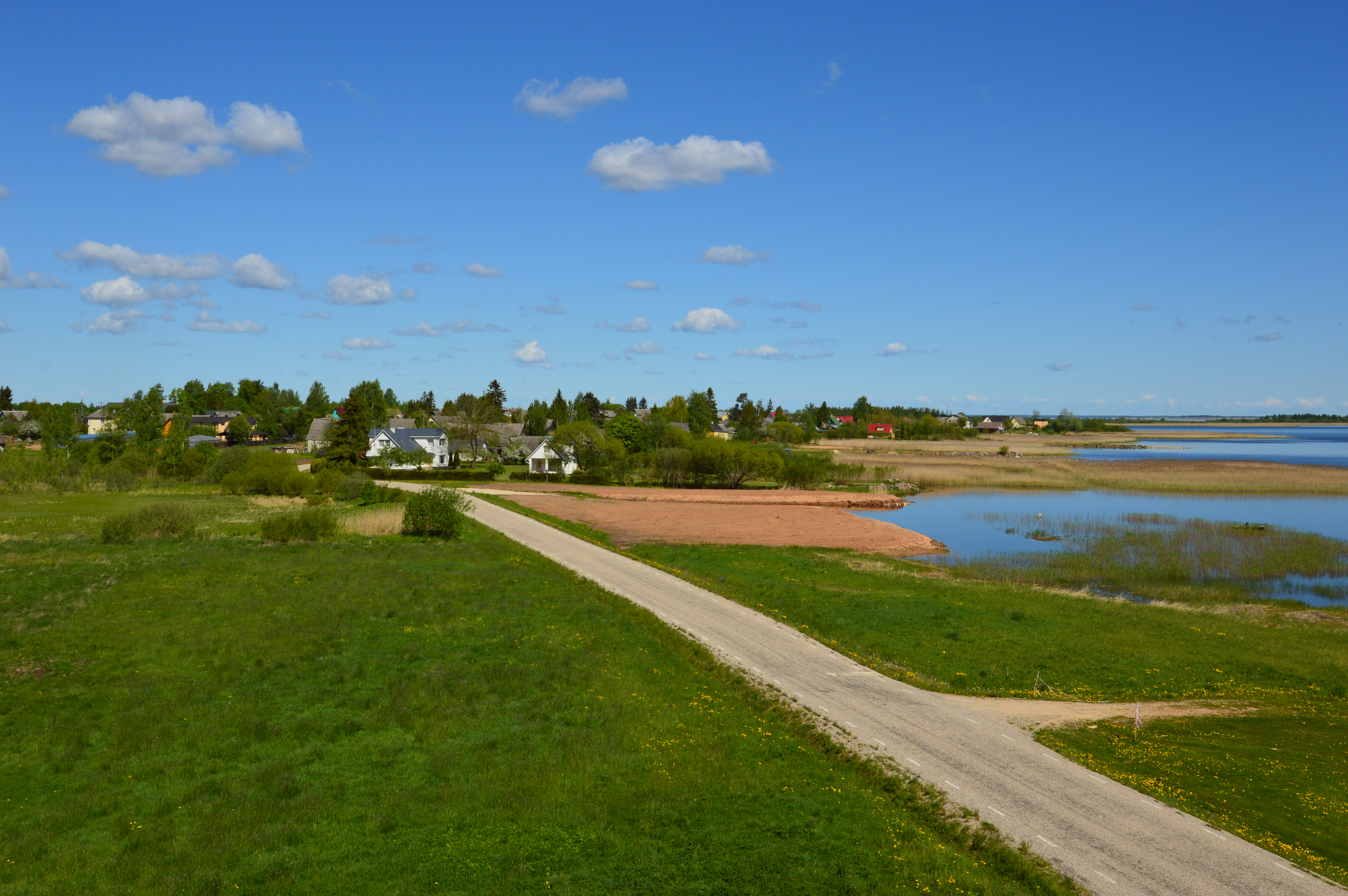
Lake Pskov, Estonian shoreline

Map of pools of Narva and Lake Peipus

== Basin and islands ==
About 30 rivers flow into the lake. The largest are Velikaya and Emajõgi; smaller rivers include Zadubka, Cherma, Gdovka, Kuna, Torokhovka, Remda, Rovya, Zhelcha, Chernaya, Lipenka, Startseva, Borovka, Abija, Obdeh, Piusa, Võhandu, Kodza, Kargaya, Omedu, Tagajõgi and Alajõgi. The lake is drained by only one river, the Narva, into the Baltic Sea.

The lake contains 29 islands, with a total area of 25.8 km^{2}, with 40 more islands located within the delta of the Velikaya River. The islands are low wetlands, elevated above the lake surface on average by only 1–2 metres (3 ft 3 in – 6 ft 7 in) (maximum 4.5 metres (15 ft)) and therefore suffer from floods. The largest islands are Kolpina (area 11 km^{2}) in the south, Piirissaar (area 7.39 km^{2} (2.85 sq mi) in the center, and Kamenka (area 6 km^{2}). In the center of Lake Pskov there is a group of Talabski Islands (Talabsk, Talabenets and Verkhniy).

== Flora and fauna ==
The lake hosts 54 species of coastal aquatic flora, including cane, calamus (Acorus calamus), bulrush, grass rush, lesser bulrush (Typha angustifolia) and water parsnip (Sium latifolium). Floating plants are rare and are of only three types: arrowhead, yellow water-lily and water knotweed. The lake is home to perch, pike-perch, bream, roach, whitefish, smelt, and other species of fish. The wetlands of the coastal strip of the lake are important resting and feeding grounds for swans, geese, and ducks migrating between the White Sea and the Baltic Sea and western Europe. Lake Peipus is one of the main stopovers for Bewick's swan (Cygnus columbianus). The swans leave their breeding grounds in the Russian Arctic 1,600 kilometres (990 mi) away, and the lake is the first stop for many. Bewick's swans rarely fly more than 1,900 kilometres (1,200 mi) without feeding, and so they are near the limits of their endurance when they reach the lake.

== Ecology ==
The ecological condition of the lake basin is, in general, satisfactory: the water is mostly grades I and II (clean), and is grade III in some rivers due to the high content of phosphorus. The water condition of the rivers has improved since 2001–2007, but there has been an increase in the population of blue-green algae. The main problem of Lake Peipus is its eutrophication.

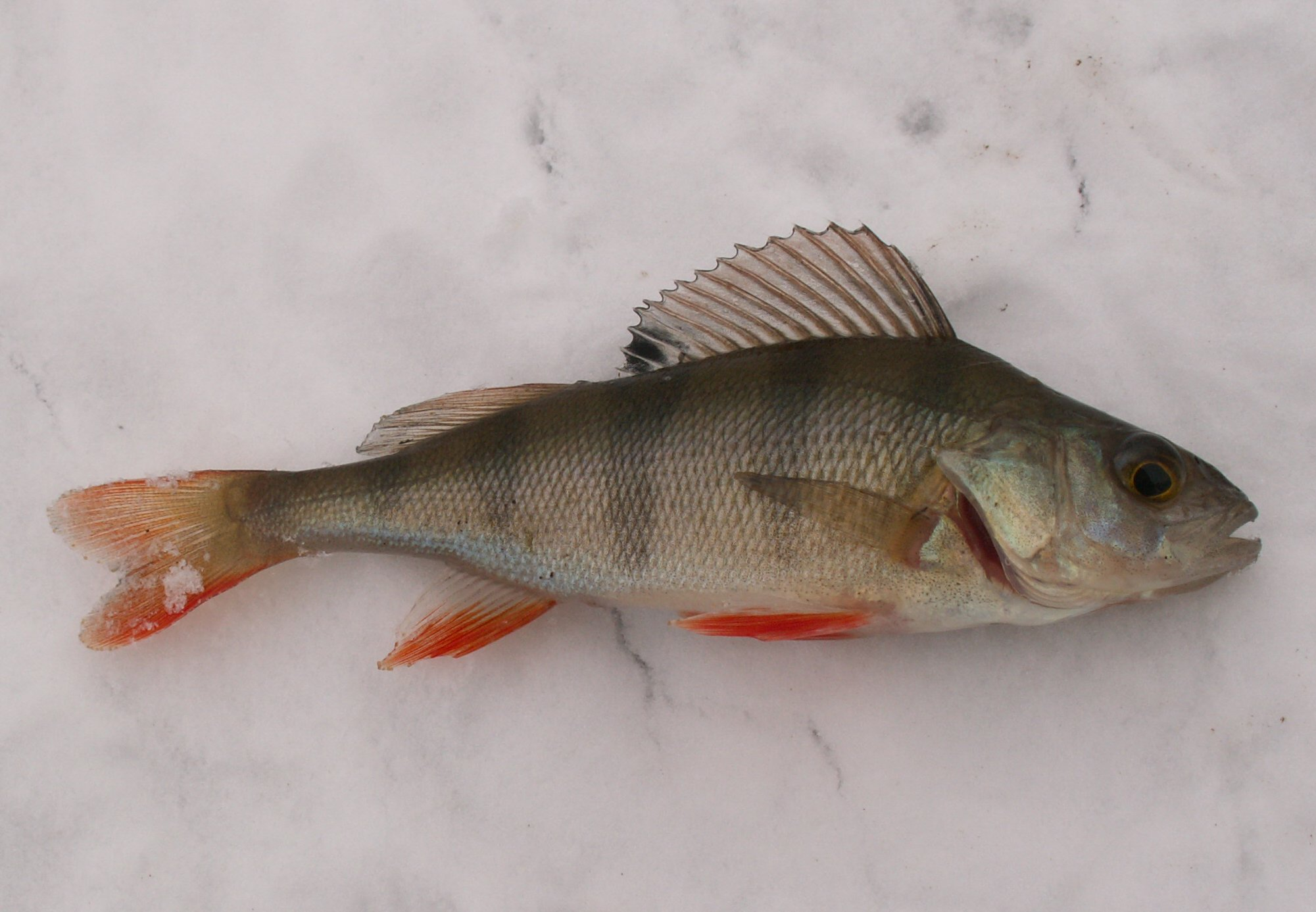
European perch

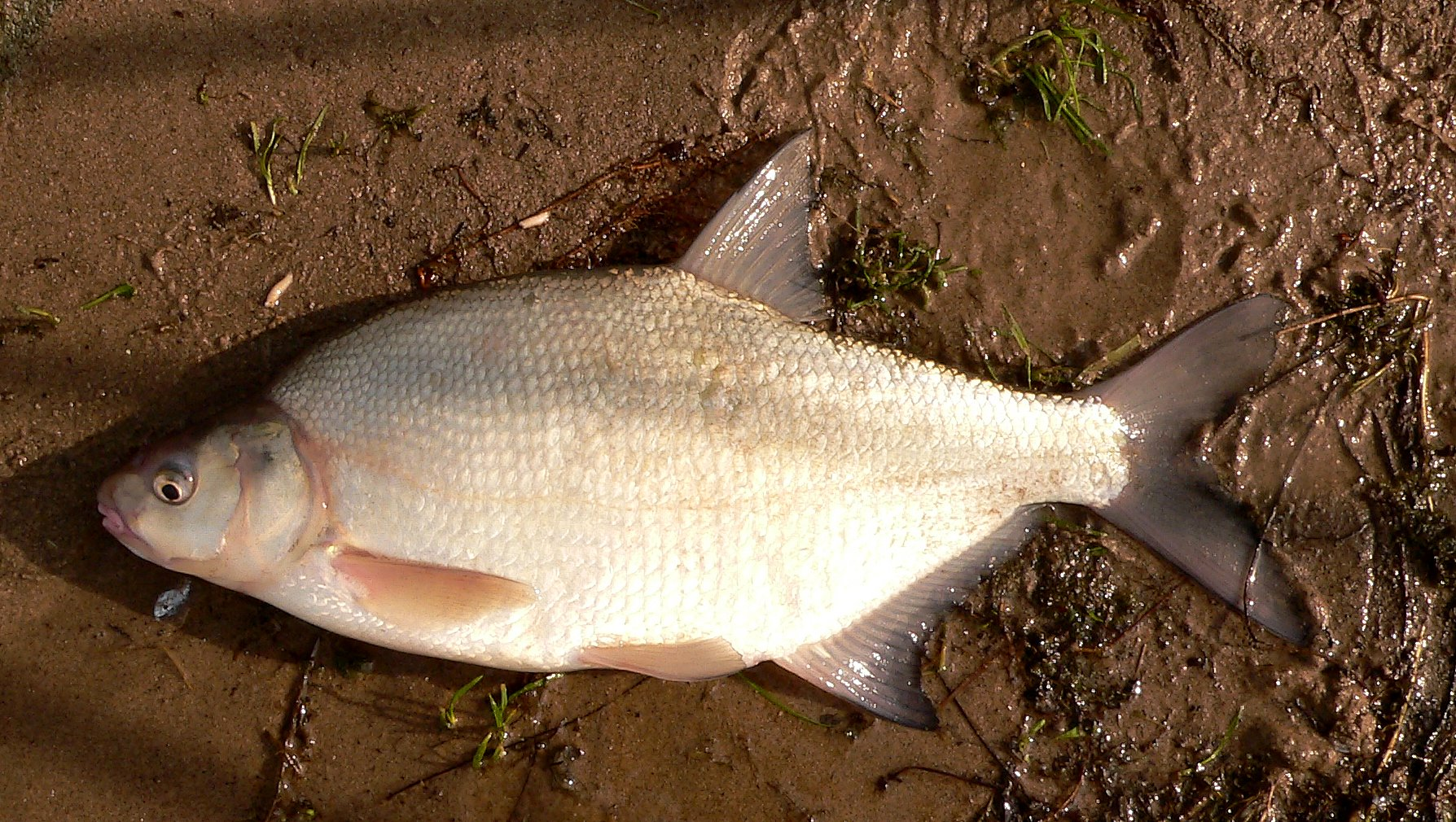
Carp bream

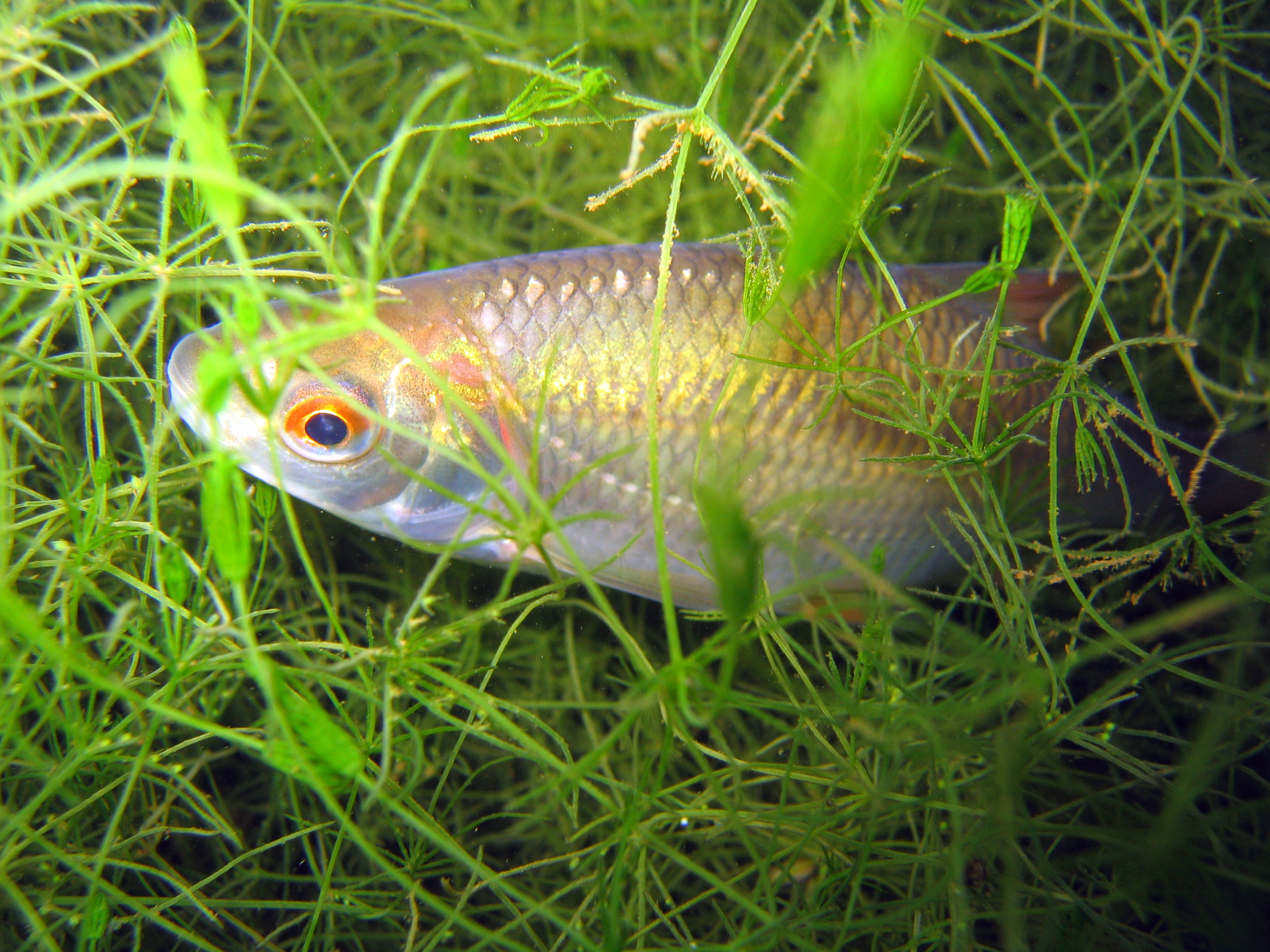
Roach

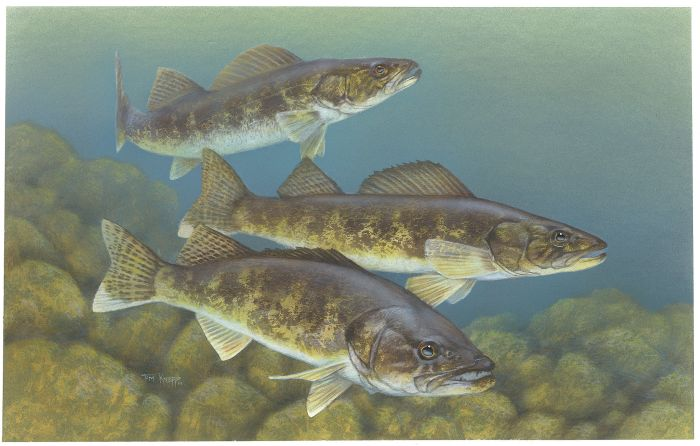
Pike-perch

== Economy ==
The towns standing on the banks are relatively small and include Mustvee (population 1610), Kallaste (population 1260) and Gdov (population 4400). The largest city, Pskov (population 202 000) stands on the Velikaya River, 10 kilometres (6.2 mi) from the lake. Ship navigation is well developed and serves the fishery, transport of goods and passengers and tourist tours. The picturesque shores of the lake are a popular destination for tourism and recreation at several tourist camps and sanatoriums.

== History ==
In 1242, the southern part of Lake Peipus was the site of a major historical battle in which the Teutonic Knights were defeated by Novgorod troops led by Alexander Nevsky. The battle is remarkable in that it was mostly fought on the frozen surface of the lake, and it is therefore called the Battle on the Ice.

The largest city on the lake, Pskov, is also one of the oldest cities in Russia, known since at least AD 903 from a record in the Primary Chronicle of the Laurentian Codex. The city had a certain measure of independence even though it was dominated by its neighbours – Novgorod, Lithuania and Muscovy – and eventually incorporated in the Russian state. Several historical buildings remain in the city, including Mirozhsky Monastery (1156, which contains famous frescoes from the 14th to 17th centuries), Pskov Kremlin (14th to 17th centuries) with five-domed Trinity Cathedral (1682–1699), churches of Ivanovo (until 1243), Snetogorsky Monastery (13th century), Church of Basil (1413), Church of Cosmas and Damian (1462), Church of St. George (1494) and others.

Gdov was founded in 1431 as a fortress and became a city in 1780; the only remains of the historical Gdov Kremlin are three fortress walls. Kallaste was founded in the 18th century by the Old Believers who had fled from the Novgorod area, and there is still a functional Russian Orthodox Old-Rite Church in the town. Near Kallaste, there is one of the largest surfacings of Devonian sandstone with a length of 930 metres (3,050 ft) and a maximum height of 8 metres (26 ft), as well as several caves and one of the largest colonies of swallows in Estonia.

== See also ==
- List of lakes of Estonia
