= Zapolye =

Zapolye (Russian: Заполье) is the name of several rural localities in Russia.

== Arkhangelsk Oblast ==
As of 2022, fifteen rural localities in Arkhangelsk Oblast bear this name:

- Zapolye, Krechetovsky Selsoviet, Kargopolsky District, Arkhangelsk Oblast, a village in Krechetovsky Selsoviet of Kargopolsky District
- Zapolye, Tikhmangsky Selsoviet, Kargopolsky District, Arkhangelsk Oblast, a village in Tikhmangsky Selsoviet of Kargopolsky District
- Zapolye, Khavrogorsky Selsoviet, Kholmogorsky District, Arkhangelsk Oblast, a village in Khavrogorsky Selsoviet of Kholmogorsky District
- Zapolye, Khavrogorsky Selsoviet, Kholmogorsky District, Arkhangelsk Oblast, a village in Khavrogorsky Selsoviet of Kholmogorsky District
- Zapolye, Khavrogorsky Selsoviet, Kholmogorsky District, Arkhangelsk Oblast, a village in Khavrogorsky Selsoviet of Kholmogorsky District
- Zapolye, Kopachevsky Selsoviet, Kholmogorsky District, Arkhangelsk Oblast, a village in Kopachevsky Selsoviet of Kholmogorsky District
- Zapolye, Matigorsky Selsoviet, Kholmogorsky District, Arkhangelsk Oblast, a village in Matigorsky Selsoviet of Kholmogorsky District
- Zapolye, Yemetsky Selsoviet, Kholmogorsky District, Arkhangelsk Oblast, a village in Yemetsky Selsoviet of Kholmogorsky District
- Zapolye, Yemetsky Selsoviet, Kholmogorsky District, Arkhangelsk Oblast, a village in Yemetsky Selsoviet of Kholmogorsky District
- Zapolye, Yemetsky Selsoviet, Kholmogorsky District, Arkhangelsk Oblast, a village in Yemetsky Selsoviet of Kholmogorsky District
- Zapolye, Zachachyevsky Selsoviet, Kholmogorsky District, Arkhangelsk Oblast, a village in Zachachyevsky Selsoviet of Kholmogorsky District
- Zapolye, Zachachyevsky Selsoviet, Kholmogorsky District, Arkhangelsk Oblast, a village in Zachachyevsky Selsoviet of Kholmogorsky District
- Zapolye, Lyakhovsky Selsoviet, Krasnoborsky District, Arkhangelsk Oblast, a village in Lyakhovsky Selsoviet of Krasnoborsky District
- Zapolye, Telegovsky Selsoviet, Krasnoborsky District, Arkhangelsk Oblast, a village in Telegovsky Selsoviet of Krasnoborsky District
- Zapolye, Lensky District, Arkhangelsk Oblast, a village in Irtovsky Selsoviet of Lensky District

== Bryansk Oblast ==
As of 2022, two rural localities in Bryansk Oblast bear this name:

- Zapolye, Pochepsky District, Bryansk Oblast, a village in Polnikovsky Selsoviet of Pochepsky District
- Zapolye, Surazhsky District, Bryansk Oblast, a settlement in Kamensky Selsoviet of Surazhsky District

== Kaliningrad Oblast ==
As of 2022, one rural locality in Kaliningrad Oblast bears this name:

- Zapolye, Kaliningrad Oblast, a settlement in Krasnoyarsky Rural Okrug of Ozyorsky District

== Kaluga Oblast ==
As of 2022, one rural locality in Kaluga Oblast bears this name:

- Zapolye, Kaluga Oblast, a village in Dzerzhinsky District

== Kirov Oblast ==
As of 2022, one rural locality in Kirov Oblast bears this name:

- Zapolye, Kirov Oblast, a village in Spas-Talitsky Rural Okrug of Orichevsky District

== Kostroma Oblast ==
As of 2022, one rural locality in Kostroma Oblast bears this name:

- Zapolye, Kostroma Oblast, a village in Sudayskoye Settlement of Chukhlomsky District

== Leningrad Oblast ==
As of 2022, twelve rural localities in Leningrad Oblast bear this name:

- Zapolye, Bolshedvorskoye Settlement Municipal Formation, Boksitogorsky District, Leningrad Oblast, a village in Bolshedvorskoye Settlement Municipal Formation of Boksitogorsky District
- Zapolye, Borskoye Settlement Municipal Formation, Boksitogorsky District, Leningrad Oblast, a village in Borskoye Settlement Municipal Formation of Boksitogorsky District
- Zapolye, Klimovskoye Settlement Municipal Formation, Boksitogorsky District, Leningrad Oblast, a village in Klimovskoye Settlement Municipal Formation of Boksitogorsky District
- Zapolye, Gatchinsky District, Leningrad Oblast, a village in Yelizavetinskoye Settlement Municipal Formation of Gatchinsky District
- Zapolye, Kingiseppsky District, Leningrad Oblast, a village in Opolyevskoye Settlement Municipal Formation of Kingiseppsky District
- Zapolye, Serebryanskoye Settlement Municipal Formation, Luzhsky District, Leningrad Oblast, a village in Serebryanskoye Settlement Municipal Formation of Luzhsky District
- Zapolye, Yam-Tesovskoye Settlement Municipal Formation, Luzhsky District, Leningrad Oblast, a village in Yam-Tesovskoye Settlement Municipal Formation of Luzhsky District
- Zapolye, Zaklinskoye Settlement Municipal Formation, Luzhsky District, Leningrad Oblast, a village in Zaklinskoye Settlement Municipal Formation of Luzhsky District
- Zapolye, Zaklinskoye Settlement Municipal Formation, Luzhsky District, Leningrad Oblast, a village in Zaklinskoye Settlement Municipal Formation of Luzhsky District
- Zapolye, Tolmachevskoye Settlement Municipal Formation, Luzhsky District, Leningrad Oblast, a village under the administrative jurisdiction of Tolmachevskoye Settlement Municipal Formation of Luzhsky District
- Zapolye, Volosovsky District, Leningrad Oblast, a village in Izvarskoye Settlement Municipal Formation of Volosovsky District
- Zapolye, Vyborgsky District, Leningrad Oblast, a logging depot settlement in Polyanskoye Settlement Municipal Formation of Vyborgsky District

== Moscow Oblast ==
As of 2022, one rural locality in Moscow Oblast bears this name:

- Zapolye, Moscow Oblast, a village in Poretskoye Rural Settlement of Mozhaysky District

== Novgorod Oblast ==
As of 2022, seven rural localities in Novgorod Oblast bear this name:

- Zapolye, Batetskoye Settlement, Batetsky District, Novgorod Oblast, a village in Batetskoye Settlement of Batetsky District
- Zapolye, Peredolskoye Settlement, Batetsky District, Novgorod Oblast, a village in Peredolskoye Settlement of Batetsky District
- Zapolye, Lyubytinsky District, Novgorod Oblast, a village under the administrative jurisdiction of the urban-type settlement of Nebolchi, Lyubytinsky District
- Zapolye, Poddorsky District, Novgorod Oblast, a village in Poddorskoye Settlement of Poddorsky District
- Zapolye, Shimsky District, Novgorod Oblast, a village under the administrative jurisdiction of the urban-type settlement of Shimsk, Shimsky District
- Zapolye, Gorskoye Settlement, Soletsky District, Novgorod Oblast, a village in Gorskoye Settlement of Soletsky District
- Zapolye, Vybitskoye Settlement, Soletsky District, Novgorod Oblast, a village in Vybitskoye Settlement of Soletsky District

== Orenburg Oblast ==
As of 2022, one rural locality in Orenburg Oblast bears this name:

- Zapolye, Orenburg Oblast, a settlement in Komsomolsky Selsoviet of Adamovsky District

== Perm Krai ==
As of 2022, ten rural localities in Perm Krai bear this name:

- Zapolye, Ilyinsky District, Perm Krai, a village in Ilyinsky District
- Zapolye (Verkh-Invenskoye Rural Settlement), Kudymkarsky District, Perm Krai, a village in Kudymkarsky District; municipally, a part of Verkh-Invenskoye Rural Settlement of that district
- Zapolye (Beloyevskoye Rural Settlement), Kudymkarsky District, Perm Krai, a village in Kudymkarsky District; municipally, a part of Beloyevskoye Rural Settlement of that district
- Zapolye (Postanogovskoye Rural Settlement), Nytvensky District, Perm Krai, a village in Nytvensky District; municipally, a part of Postanogovskoye Rural Settlement of that district
- Zapolye (Nytvenskoye Urban Settlement), Nytvensky District, Perm Krai, a village in Nytvensky District; municipally, a part of Nytvenskoye Urban Settlement of that district
- Zapolye (Taborskoye Rural Settlement), Okhansky District, Perm Krai, a village in Okhansky District; municipally, a part of Taborskoye Rural Settlement of that district
- Zapolye (Kazanskoye Rural Settlement), Okhansky District, Perm Krai, a village in Okhansky District; municipally, a part of Kazanskoye Rural Settlement of that district
- Zapolye, Permsky District, Perm Krai, a village in Permsky District
- Zapolye (Sepychevskoye Rural Settlement), Vereshchaginsky District, Perm Krai, a village in Vereshchaginsky District; municipally, a part of Sepychevskoye Rural Settlement of that district
- Zapolye (Putinskoye Rural Settlement), Vereshchaginsky District, Perm Krai, a village in Vereshchaginsky District; municipally, a part of Putinskoye Rural Settlement of that district

== Pskov Oblast ==
As of 2022, seventeen rural localities in Pskov Oblast bear this name:

- Zapolye, Bezhanitsky District, Pskov Oblast, a village in Bezhanitsky District
- Zapolye (Vyazyevskaya Rural Settlement), Dedovichsky District, Pskov Oblast, a village in Dedovichsky District; municipally, a part of Vyazyevskaya Rural Settlement of that district
- Zapolye (Sosonskaya Rural Settlement), Dedovichsky District, Pskov Oblast, a village in Dedovichsky District; municipally, a part of Sosonskaya Rural Settlement of that district
- Zapolye (Gavrovskaya Rural Settlement), Dnovsky District, Pskov Oblast, a village in Dnovsky District; municipally, a part of Gavrovskaya Rural Settlement of that district
- Zapolye (Iskrovskaya Rural Settlement), Dnovsky District, Pskov Oblast, a village in Dnovsky District; municipally, a part of Iskrovskaya Rural Settlement of that district
- Zapolye (Dobruchinskaya Rural Settlement), Gdovsky District, Pskov Oblast, a village in Gdovsky District; municipally, a part of Dobruchinskaya Rural Settlement of that district
- Zapolye (Yushkinskaya Rural Settlement), Gdovsky District, Pskov Oblast, a village in Gdovsky District; municipally, a part of Yushkinskaya Rural Settlement of that district
- Zapolye, Loknyansky District, Pskov Oblast, a village in Loknyansky District
- Zapolye, Palkinsky District, Pskov Oblast, a village in Palkinsky District
- Zapolye (Zapolskaya Rural Settlement), Plyussky District, Pskov Oblast, a village in Plyussky District; municipally, a part of Zapolskaya Rural Settlement of that district
- Zapolye (Plyusskaya Rural Settlement), Plyussky District, Pskov Oblast, a village in Plyussky District; municipally, a part of Plyusskaya Rural Settlement of that district
- Zapolye (Dubrovenskaya Rural Settlement), Porkhovsky District, Pskov Oblast, a village in Porkhovsky District; municipally, a part of Dubrovenskaya Rural Settlement of that district
- Zapolye (Logovinskaya Rural Settlement), Porkhovsky District, Pskov Oblast, a village in Porkhovsky District; municipally, a part of Logovinskaya Rural Settlement of that district
- Zapolye (Slavkovskaya Rural Settlement), Porkhovsky District, Pskov Oblast, a village in Porkhovsky District; municipally, a part of Slavkovskaya Rural Settlement of that district
- Zapolye (Sikovitskaya Rural Settlement), Strugo-Krasnensky District, Pskov Oblast, a village in Strugo-Krasnensky District; municipally, a part of Sikovitskaya Rural Settlement of that district
- Zapolye (Maryinskaya Rural Settlement), Strugo-Krasnensky District, Pskov Oblast, a village in Strugo-Krasnensky District; municipally, a part of Maryinskaya Rural Settlement of that district
- Zapolye (Novoselskaya Rural Settlement), Strugo-Krasnensky District, Pskov Oblast, a village in Strugo-Krasnensky District; municipally, a part of Novoselskaya Rural Settlement of that district

== Ryazan Oblast ==
As of 2022, two rural localities in Ryazan Oblast bear this name:

- Zapolye, Shilovsky District, Ryazan Oblast, a village in Mosolovsky Rural Okrug of Shilovsky District
- Zapolye, Starozhilovsky District, Ryazan Oblast, a selo in Grebnevsky Rural Okrug of Starozhilovsky District

== Smolensk Oblast ==
As of 2022, two rural localities in Smolensk Oblast bear this name:

- Zapolye, Kardymovsky District, Smolensk Oblast, a village in Tyushinskoye Rural Settlement of Kardymovsky District
- Zapolye, Yelninsky District, Smolensk Oblast, a village in Malyshevskoye Rural Settlement of Yelninsky District

== Tver Oblast ==
As of 2022, four rural localities in Tver Oblast bear this name:

- Zapolye, Rameshkovsky District, Tver Oblast, a village in Rameshkovsky District
- Zapolye, Torzhoksky District, Tver Oblast, a village in Torzhoksky District
- Zapolye, Vyshnevolotsky District, Tver Oblast, a village in Vyshnevolotsky District
- Zapolye, Zapadnodvinsky District, Tver Oblast, a village in Zapadnodvinsky District

== Vladimir Oblast ==
As of 2022, one rural locality in Vladimir Oblast bears this name:

- Zapolye, Vladimir Oblast, a village in Kovrovsky District

== Vologda Oblast ==
As of 2022, four rural localities in Vologda Oblast bear this name:

- Zapolye, Babayevsky District, Vologda Oblast, a village in Siuchsky Selsoviet of Babayevsky District
- Zapolye, Chagodoshchensky District, Vologda Oblast, a village in Belokrestsky Selsoviet of Chagodoshchensky District
- Zapolye, Chuchkovsky Selsoviet, Sokolsky District, Vologda Oblast, a village in Chuchkovsky Selsoviet of Sokolsky District
- Zapolye, Vorobyevsky Selsoviet, Sokolsky District, Vologda Oblast, a village in Vorobyevsky Selsoviet of Sokolsky District
