= Zaplyusye =

Zaplyusye (Russian: Заплюсье) is the name of several inhabited localities in Pskov Oblast, Russia.

== Urban localities ==
- Zaplyusye (urban-type settlement), a work settlement in Plyussky District

== Rural localities ==
- Zaplyusye (rural locality), a village in Plyussky District
