= Vyazka =

Vyazka may refer to:

- Vyazka, Gdov, Pskov Oblast, a village under jurisdiction of the town of Gdov, Pskov Oblast, Russia
- Vyazka, Plyussky District, Pskov Oblast, a village in Plyussky District of Pskov Oblast, Russia
