= Zaplyusye (urban-type settlement) =

Zaplyusye Заплюсье
- Work settlement
- Interactive map of Zaplyusye
- Location of Zaplyusye Zaplyusye (Pskov Oblast)
- Coordinates: 58°26′N 29°44′E
- Country: Russia
- Federal subject: Pskov Oblast
- Administrative district: Plyussky District
- Founded: 1955
- Urban-type settlement status since: 1961

Population (2010 Census)
  - Total: 1,096
  - Estimate (2021): 869 (−20.7%)

Municipal status
  - Municipal district: Plyussky Municipal District
  - Urban settlement: Zaplyusye Urban Settlement
  - Capital of: Zaplyusye Urban Settlement
- Time zone: UTC+3 (MSK)
- Postal code: 181013
- OKTMO ID: 58643158051

Zaplyusye (Russian: За́плюсье) is an urban locality (a work settlement) in Plyussky District of Pskov Oblast, Russia, located in the east of the district, right at the border with Leningrad Oblast. Municipally, it is incorporated as Zaplyusye Urban Settlement in Plyussky Municipal District, one of the two urban settlements in the district. Population: 1,096 (2010 census); 1,393 (2002 census); 1,887 (1989 Soviet census).

== History ==
In 1953, preparatory works started from the Zaplyusskiye Mkhi peat deposit. In 1955, a settlement of Zaplyusye was founded to serve the production. At the time, it was already a part of Plyussky District of Pskov Oblast. The production started in 1958. The entire production of the deposit was to serve the city of Leningrad, and the peat plant was a part of Lentorf, the enterprise producing peat in Leningrad Oblast. In 1961, Zaplyusye was granted urban-type settlement status. It became the first urban-type settlement in the district: the district's administrative center, Plyussa, remained a rural locality until 1971.

== Economy ==
=== Industry ===
Zaplyusye is essentially centered on a single enterprise, Rostorfinvest, which specializes in peat production.

=== Transportation ===
Zaplyusye is located on the M20 highway which connects Saint Petersburg and Pskov.
