= Demographic history of Russia =

This article presents the demographic history of Russia covering the period of Kievan Rus, its successor states, the Mongol domination and the unified Tsardom of Russia, the Russian Empire. See Demographics of the Soviet Union and Demographics of Russia for a more detailed overview of the current and 20th century demographics.

== Kievan Rus, Mongol invasion and vassalage ==
Principalities of Kievan Rus

=== Population ===
Kievan Rus was a loose federation of East Slavic, Norse and Finnic peoples in Europe from the late 9th to the mid-13th century. The population of Kievan Rus is estimated to have been between 4.5 million and 8 million, however in the absence of historical sources these estimates are based on the assumed population density. The great majority of the population was rural and lived in small villages with no more than ten households, except for some exceptionally fertile areas such as Zalesye. The urban populations were estimated by Tikhomirov based on the data from the chronicles: militia size, fortified area, number of churches, epidemic victims and burned houses. Kiev had tens of thousands of inhabitants, the population of Novgorod numbered 10–15 thousand in the beginning of 11th century and 20–30 thousand 200 years later. Smolensk, Polotsk (currently a city in Belarus), Vladimir and Chernigov (now Volodymyr-Volynskyi and Chernihiv in Ukraine) were comparable in size to Novgorod, while the great majority of the other cities had no more than 1000 citizens. Subsequent archeological research produced similar numbers for the biggest cities: up to 35 thousand in Novgorod and up to 50 thousand in Kiev.

The Mongol invasion in the 13th century devastated most of Kievan Rus, with only the North-West (Novgorod, Pskov, Smolensk) escaping the widespread destruction. Out of 74 major cities, 49 were destroyed and many of them were abandoned or became villages. Two thirds of settlements in the Moscow region disappeared. The recovery started in the beginning of the 14th century, with new lands entering cultivation, new settlements appearing and monumental construction growing quickly. In Novgorod Land, which was less fertile than the North-East and could support lower population density, there are signs of over-population starting from the 1360s: epidemics, high food prices, famines, peasants falling into arrears and losing their lands to nobles and monasteries. The North-East was hit by Edigu's invasion and by pestilence in the beginning of 15th century which led the author of the chronicle to remark that few people remained in all the Russian land (и мало людий во всей Русской земле остася). This was followed by the Muscovite Civil War.

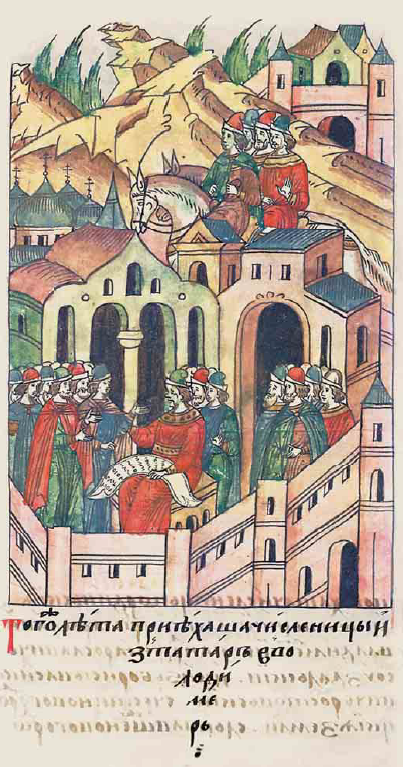
The Mongols carried out several censuses to set the tribute during the period of their domination. The 16th century miniature depicts the census in Vladimir in 1257

=== Internal migrations ===
The lands of Rostov-Suzdal Principality were settled by Slavs in this period, with the native Finno-Permic speakers being gradually assimilated. In the North the territories between Onega and Ladoga lakes and along Svir, Northern Dvina and Vyatka rivers attracted Novgorodian settlers. The Mongol invasion triggered an internal migration from less secure Southern lands to the forested regions of Moscow, Tver and Upper Volga.

=== Social stratification ===
The population of Kievan Rus consisted of nobility (boyars), free and partially free peasants (smerd, zakup, ryadovich) and kholops whose status was similar to that of slaves.

== Early modern period ==
=== Population ===
The first reliable data on the number of households dates to the late 15th century, when Ivan III carried out several censuses of the newly incorporated Novgorod land. As these censuses counted adult heads of households the total population estimates of Novgorod land vary between 500 and 800 thousand.

By the end of 15th century, the East Slavs were divided between the Grand Duchy of Moscow and the Grand Duchy of Lithuania. The population of the former was estimated to be around 5.8 million in 1500, growing to 9–10 million by 1550. Vodarsky estimates the population in mid-16th century to be 6.5 million, growing to 7 million by the end of it. The contemporary population of the Grand Duchy of Lithuania numbered 3.6 million, with Ruthenians constituting the majority (see Demographic history of Poland).

As the population of Muscovy was growing the size of the average peasant allotment declined (though there were significant regional variations) and the wages declined as well while the grain prices soared. The Livonian War led to the increase of tax burden on the peasants and when the crops failed in 1567 and 1568 a famine ensued, followed by a plague of 1570-1571. In the best-documented Novgorod land some regions lost between 40 and 60% to famine, decease and emigration.

The relatively calm period of 1584–1600 was followed by the Time of Troubles when a few consecutive crop failures led to a famine and a collapse of the Russian state, foreign interventions and widespread destruction. The population size only reached the 1600 level fifty years later.

According to the census of 1678 there were 950,000 households in Russia. The estimates for the total population range between 10.5 and 11.5 million depending on the assumptions of the average number of individuals in a household and of the percentage of population that avoided the census. As the census was used to determine poll taxes due, both peasants and landlords had the incentive to minimise the number of counted households. They could conceal them, combine several households into one or report peasants as household servants (дворовые люди) who were not taxed.

The biggest cities in the 16th century were Moscow (41,500 households), Pskov (6,000) and Novgorod (5,500), while in the 17th century Yaroslavl became the second biggest city after Moscow.

=== Internal migrations ===
The settlement of southern borderlands continued during this period. The former Wild Fields became safer as the new defence lines and fortresses were founded and its rich soils attracted settlers from the central Russia. The conquest of Siberia started in late 16th century and within one hundred years most of Siberia belonged to Russia. At that time there were 40 thousand Russian peasants in Siberia and the settlement gathered pace in the beginning of 18th century.

=== Social stratification ===
Peasants constituted 90% of households in 1678, with 3% of townsfolk (посадские люди) and 7% of untaxed classes (service class people and clergy) according to the census of 1678. Serfs living on the lands belonging to the nobility, the church or the royal family accounted for the majority or the peasants, with the remainder consisting of personally free peasants and yasak-paying non-Russians. Almost half of all serfs owned by nobles belonged to 535 richest landowners while the other 14,500 landowners owned the rest. The odnodvortsy were part of the service class people and thus did not pay taxes even though they normally did not own any serfs (hence the name, literally one-householders).

=== Ethnic composition ===
The conquest of the Kazan and Astrakhan Khanate brought a large Muslim Tatar population alongside Chuvash, Mari and Mordvin people into Russia.

== Russian Empire ==
Russia was already one of the most populous countries in Europe and, after a period of sustained growth until 1792, finally overtook France and became the leading nation in Europe with a population of around 30 million. The Colonization of Siberia pushed the Russian settlement frontier further and further east: in the 17th and 18th centuries, Russians migrated across the Volga River and the Ural Mountains to Siberia and as far as the Pacific Ocean, opening up new territories with population growth. Nevertheless, large parts of Siberia remained sparsely populated. The expansive Tsarist era was also accompanied by the urbanization of the first commercial and administrative cities; nevertheless, around 1800, the majority of the population still lived in rural areas. The first all-Russian census at the turn of the century in 1897 showed that the entire Russian Empire already had a population of around 125 million. Of these, about half to two-thirds lived within the present-day borders of Russia.

At the beginning of the 20th century, Russia had the highest fertility rate in Europe, with just under 7 children per woman, and extremely rapid population growth. Both fertility and infant mortality were significantly higher than in Western Europe, where the demographic transition had already begun. Russia lay behind the Hajnal line, and the age of marriage was low and the number of children correspondingly high. At the time, the high population growth caused great concern in Western countries (such as France and neighboring Germany) about Russia's demographic superiority. The steady demographic upswing led contemporary observers to make optimistic predictions: in 1906, for example, chemist Dmitri Mendeleev predicted that Russia would have a population of around 600 million by the year 2000. This projection was based on uninterrupted growth – a scenario that was never to become reality due to the drastic upheavals of the 20th century.

The First World War brought the previously unchecked population growth to an abrupt halt. Russia mobilized millions of young men, of whom around 1.7 million died as soldiers. This was compounded by civilian hardship caused by hunger and disease. The political upheavals of the Russian Revolution of 1917 and the subsequent civil war (1917–1922) further devastated the country. Estimates suggest that a total of 10 million people died during these years as a result of fighting, terror, and the great famine of 1921. In addition, the country lost a large part of its pre-war population due to the independence of Poland, Finland, and other territories.

== Bibliography ==
- Turchin, P.; Nefedov, S. (2009), Secular Cycles, Princeton University Press, ISBN 978-0691136967
- Gorskaya, Natalia (1994). Историческая демография России эпохи феодализма: итоги и проблемы изучения (in Russian). Наука. ISBN 9785020097506.
