= Lositsy =

Rural locality in Plyussky District, Pskov Oblast, Russia

Coordinates: 58°33′N 28°44′E

Lositsy (Russian: Лосицы) is a rural locality (a village) in Plyussky District of Pskov Oblast, Russia. Margarita Yamshchikova, an author using an alias of Al. Altayev, owned an estate in the village of Lositsy. The house is currently a museum. The estate is protected as a historical monument of federal significance.
