= Administrative divisions of the Novgorod Republic =

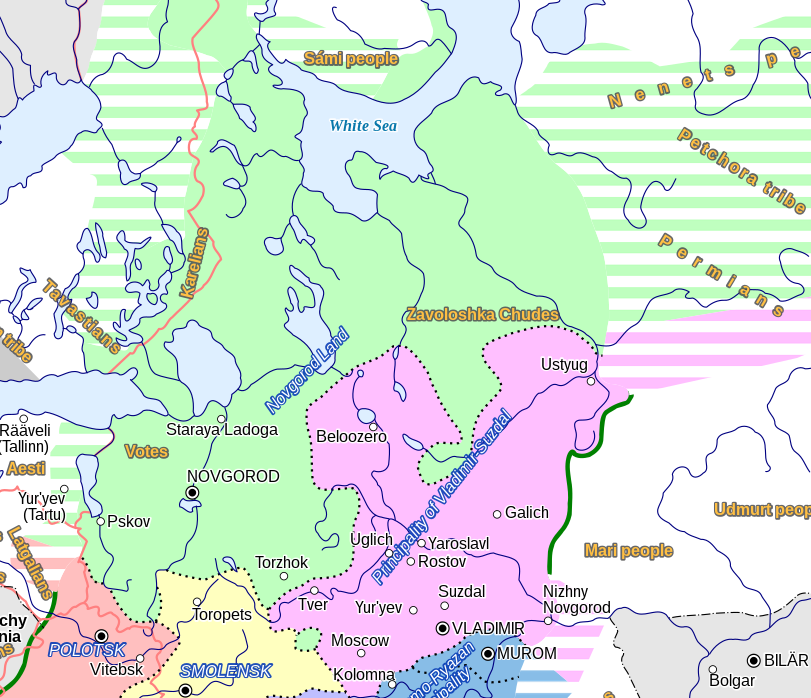
The Novgorod Republic in 1237

The administrative division of Novgorod Republic is not definitely known; the country was divided into several tysyachas (lit. thousands) and volosts. The city of Novgorod with its vicinity, as well as a few other towns, were not part of any of those. Pskov achieved an autonomy from Novgorod in the 13th century; its independence was confirmed by the Treaty of Bolotovo in 1348.

After the fall of the republic, Novgorod Land, as part of Muscovy, consisted of 5 pyatinas (literally "fifths") that were further divided into uyezds and pogosts. This division was replaced only in the beginning of 18th century when Peter I introduced guberniyas.

== Novgorod Republic ==
=== City of Novgorod ===
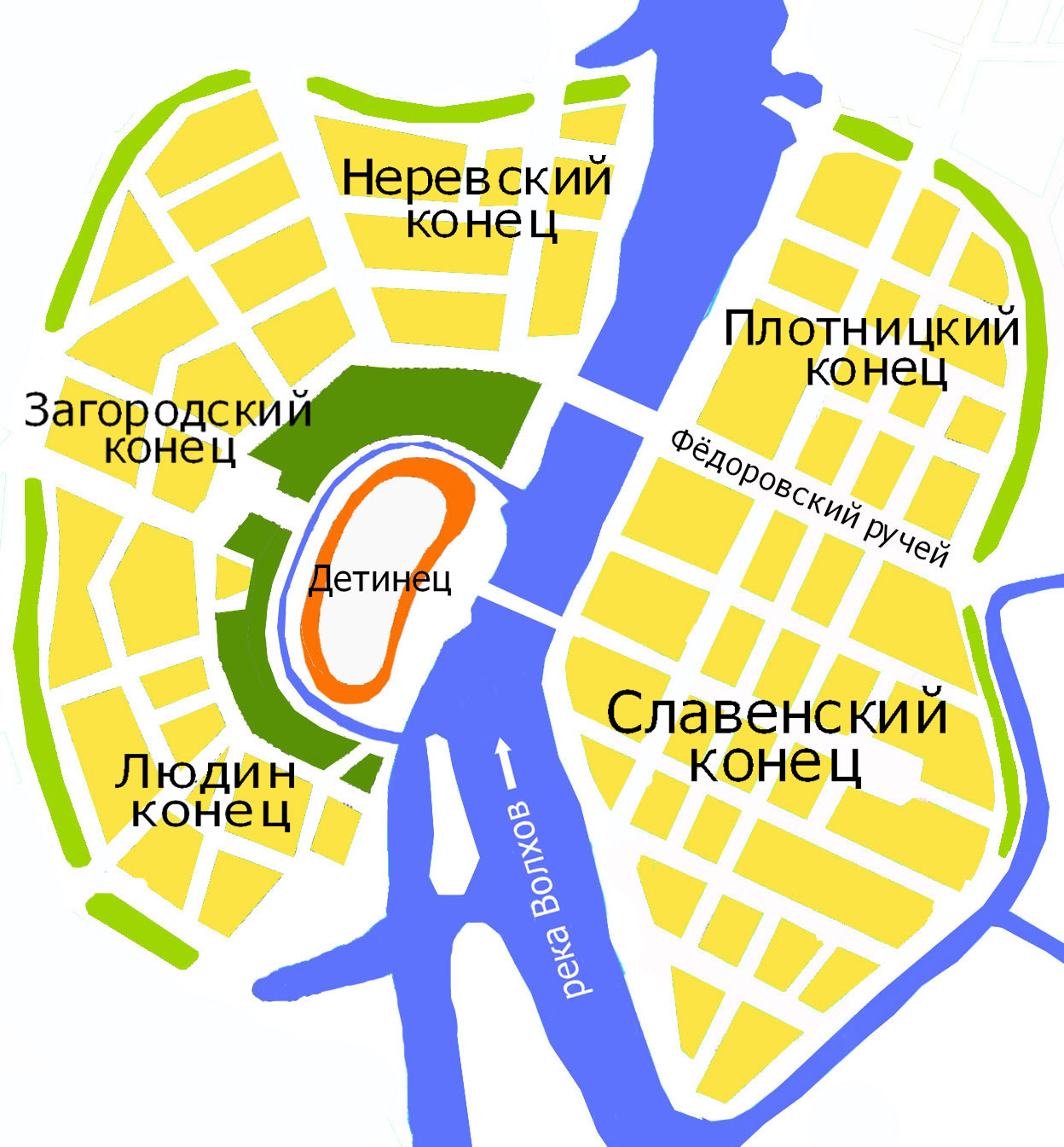
A map showing the five kontsy of Novgorod

Novgorod with its vicinity (located on upper Volkhov and near Ilmen Lake) belonged to a separate territorial unit. The city of Novgorod itself was divided into five kontsy (концы) or boroughs: Nerevsky, Zagorodsky, Lyudin, Slavensky and Plotnitsky. The city was also divided into two sides: the left-bank of the Volkhov was called the Sophia Side and the right-bank the Commercial or Trade Side.

=== Core ===
Northwestern Russia – the lands near Ilmen Lake, Volkhov River, Ladoga Lake and Gulf of Finland, often referred to as Novgorod volost in chronicles, formed the core of the state. The assumptions of the internal structure of independent Novgorod are mostly based on the list of the builders of the Great Bridge over Volkhov (1260s) and the 1471 treaty between Novgorod and Casimir IV of Poland. The former lists ten parts of Novgorod itself and nine other entities. According to Burov (1993), these were tysyachas that, together with the capital made t'ma (lit. ten thousand), mentioned in the 1471 treaty. Below is the list of tysyachas and their approximate locations:

- Rzhev'skaa (Ржевьскаа), to the southwest of Novgorod, near modern Novorzhev
- Bezhichkaa (Бежичкаа), to the east of Novgorod, with the town of Bezhetsk
- Voch'skaa (Вочьскаа; from the indigenous Votes), in Ingria
- Oboniskaya (Обониская), the southwestern shore of Ladoga Lake and near Onega Lake (that gave the name to the tysyacha) (Karelians, Pomors)
- Luskaa (Лускаа), to the west of Novgorod, west of Luga River (that gave the name to the tysyacha)
- Lop'skaya (Лопьская), the southern shore of Ladoga Lake and possibly territories to the north and west of the lake (Karelian Isthmus (f.e. Izhorians))
- Povolkhovskaya (Поволховская), in the lower reaches of Volkhov River, around the town of Staraya Ladoga
- Yazholvich'skaa (Яжолвичьскаа), to the southeast of Novgorod
- Knyazha (Княжа), to the south of Novgorod, with the centre in Staraya Russa, the second most important town in the country.

Other important towns were Porkhov, Koporye, Yama, Oreshek and Korela. Most of the towns were in the more economically developed western part of the country, in other parts only ryadki (small town-like settlements) existed or there were no town-like settlements at all.

Several towns were also not part of any tysyacha (and, thus, of t'ma) as they were owned jointly by Novgorod and one of the neighbouring states. Velikiye Luki were owned jointly by Novgorod and Smolensk Principality and later by Novgorod and Lithuania. Volokolamsk and Torzhok were owned by Novgorod and Vladimir-Suzdal Principality that became part of Muscovy.

=== Volosts ===
Vast lands to the east that were being colonised by Novgorod or just paid tribute to it were divided into volosts. Some of those volosts were:

- Zavolochye, in the basins of Northern Dvina and Onega. Its name means "beyond the portages", meaning the portages between the river systems of Volga and those rivers. It was inhabited mainly by various Balto-Finnic peoples, though many Slavs migrated there in 13th century escaping Mongol invasions.
- Perm, in the basins of Vychegda and upper Kama (see Great Perm).
- Pechora, in the basin of the eponymous river, west of the Ural Mountains.
- Yugra, to the east of Ural Mountains.
- Tre, on the Kola Peninsula.
- Kolo, on the Kola Peninsula.
- Varzuzhskaya, on the Kola Peninsula.
- Umbskaya, on the Kola Peninsula.

=== Pskov ===
After the disintegration of Kievan Rus' in the 12th century, the city of Pskov with its surrounding territories along the Velikaya River, Lake Peipus, Pskovskoye Lake and Narva River became a part of the Novgorod Republic. It kept its special autonomous rights, including the right for independent construction of suburbs (Izborsk is the most ancient among them). Due to Pskov's leading role in the struggle against the Livonian Order, its influence spread significantly. The long reign of Daumantas (1266–99) and especially his victory in the Battle of Rakovor (1268) ushered in the period of Pskov's actual independence. The Novgorod boyars formally recognized Pskov's independence in the Treaty of Bolotovo (1348), relinquishing their right to appoint the posadniks of Pskov. The city of Pskov remained dependent on Novgorod only in ecclesiastical matters until 1589, when a separate bishopric of Pskov was created and the archbishops of Novgorod dropped Pskov from their title and were created "Archbishops of Novgorod the Great and Velikie Luki".

== Pyatinas ==
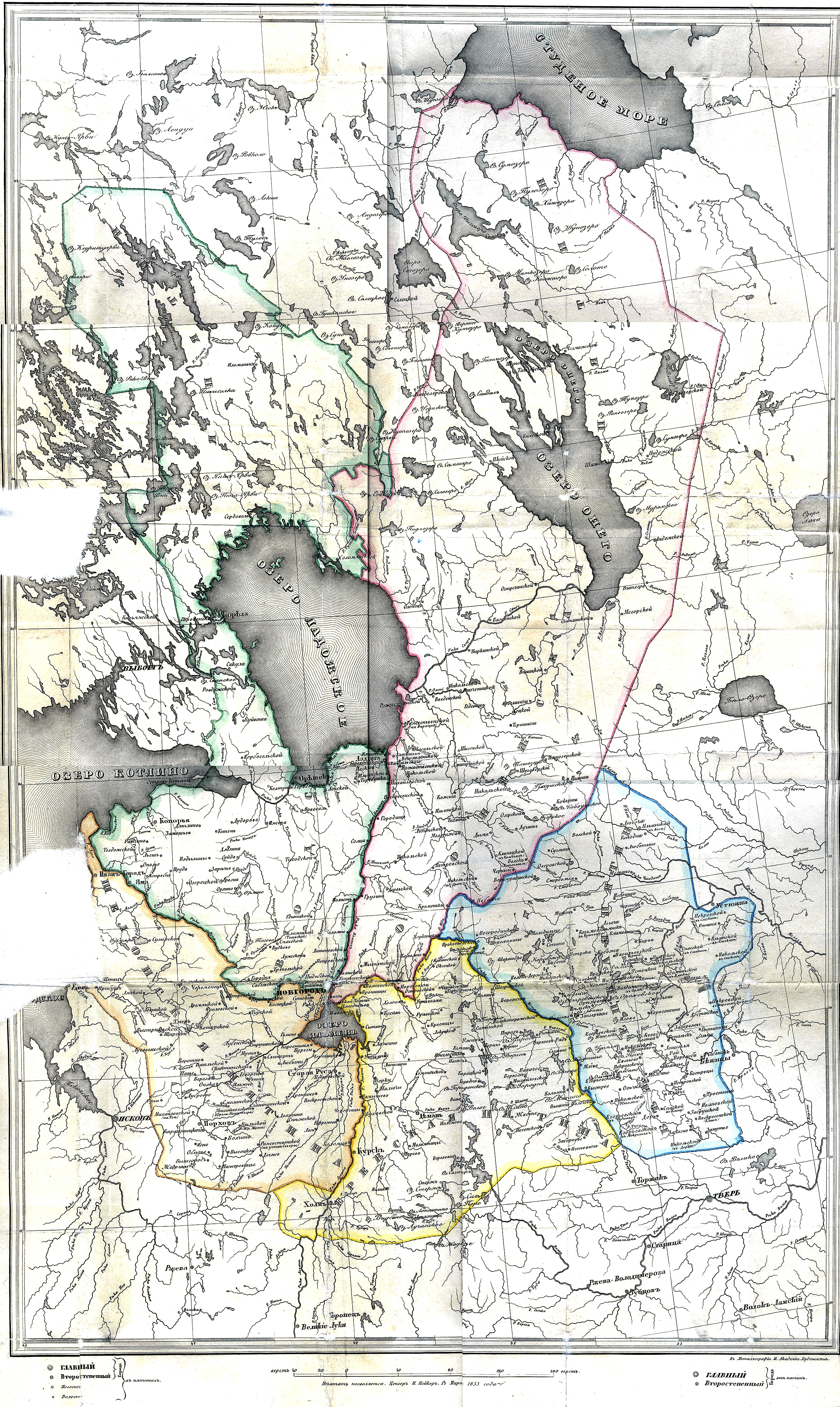
Map of Novgorodian pyatinas in the 16th century. (For reference, the sea at the top is part of the White Sea and the sea at left is the Gulf of Finland)

After the conquest of Novgorod Land by Muscovy it was divided into 5 pyatinas (fifths):

- The Pyatina of Shelon (Russian: Шелонская пятина, romanized: Shelonskaya), from Shelon River, was located between Lovat and Luga rivers to the west and southwest of Novgorod.
- The Pyatina of the Wods (Russian: Водская пятина/Вотьская пятина, romanized: Vodskaya/Votskaya), named after the Votic people that inhabited the area, was located between Luga and Volkhov rivers, to the north of Novgorod and on the shores of Ladoga Lake.
- The Pyatina of Obonezay (Russian: Обонежская пятина, romanized: Obonezhskaya), from the Onega Lake, was the biggest pyatina of all. It was located to the northeast of Novgorod on the shores of White Sea, Ladoga and Onega lakes.
- The Pyatina of the Berezayka (Russian: Бежицкая пятина, romanized: Bezhetskaya), to the east of the capital.
- The Pyatina of Derev (Russian: Деревская пятина, romanized: Derevskaya), between Msta and Lovat rivers, to the southeast of Novgorod.

== Bibliography ==
- Meier, Dirk (2006). Seafarers, Merchants and Pirates in the Middle Ages. Boydell Press. ISBN 978-1-84383-237-9.
