= Plyussa (river) =

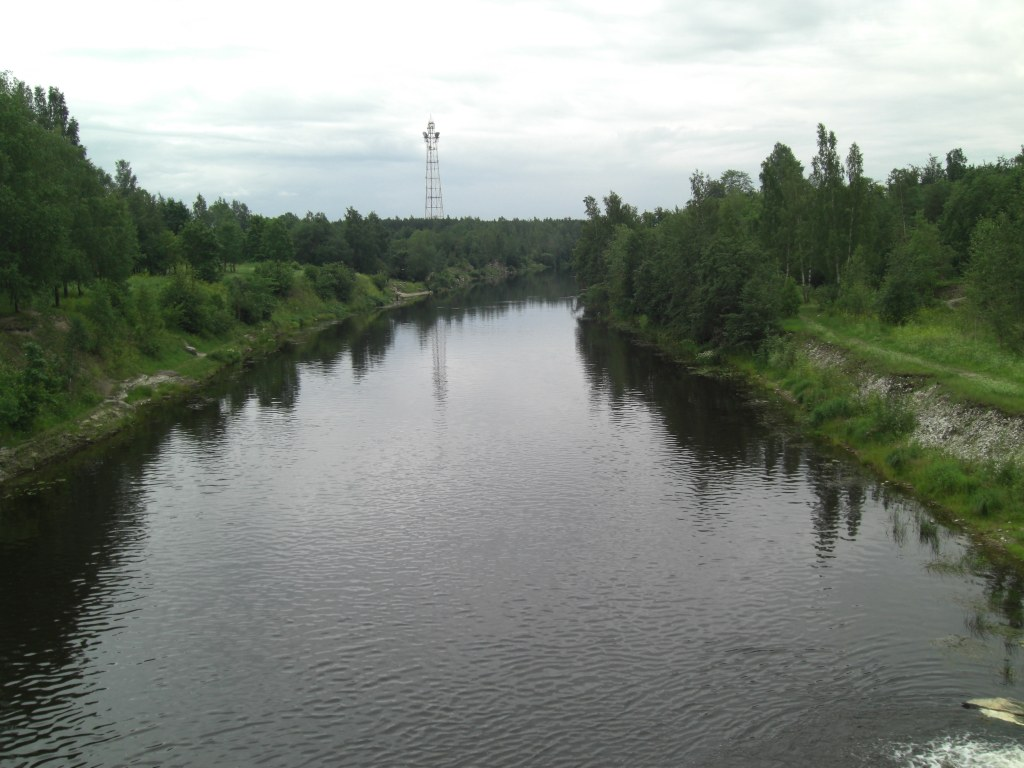
- The Plyussa in the town of Slantsy.

Location
- Country: Russia

Physical characteristics
- Source
  - location: Lake Zapluysskoye
  - coordinates: 58°24′57.1″N 29°42′17.9″E
  - elevation: 64 m (210 ft)
- Mouth: Narva
  - location: Narva Reservoir
  - coordinates: 59°14′58″N 28°9′15″E
- Length: 281 km (175 mi)
- Basin size: 6,550 km^{2} (2,530 sq mi)
- Discharge
  - average: 50 m^{3}/s (1,800 cu ft/s) (near Slantsy)

Basin features
- Progression: Narva→ Gulf of Finland
- Tributaries
  - left: Omuga, Kureya, Chernaya, Lyuta
  - right: Paguba, Verduga, Yanya, Ruya

The Plyussa (Russian: Плюсса) is a river in Plyussky and Gdovsky Districts of Pskov Oblast and in Slantsevsky District of Leningrad Oblast in Russia. It is a right tributary of the Narva. It is 281 kilometres (175 mi) long, and the area of its basin 6,550 square kilometres (2,530 sq mi). The urban-type settlement of Plyussa and the town of Slantsy are located on the banks of the Plyussa.

The source of the Plyussa is in Lake Zapluysskoye in the eastern part of Plyussky District. The river flows south and turns northwest. In Gdovsky District, it gradually turns north and enters Leningrad Oblast. Below the town of Slantsy, the natural course of the Plyussa is made a water reservoir, a bay of the Narva Reservoir. The mouth of the Plyussa is in the southern bay of the Narva Reservoir.

The river gave its name to the Treaty of Plussa, concluded at its banks. The treaty ended the Livonian War between Sweden and Russia in 1583.

Until the 1990s, the river was used for timber rafting.
