= Plyussa =

Work settlement in Pskov Oblast, Russia

Plyussa Плюсса
- Work settlement
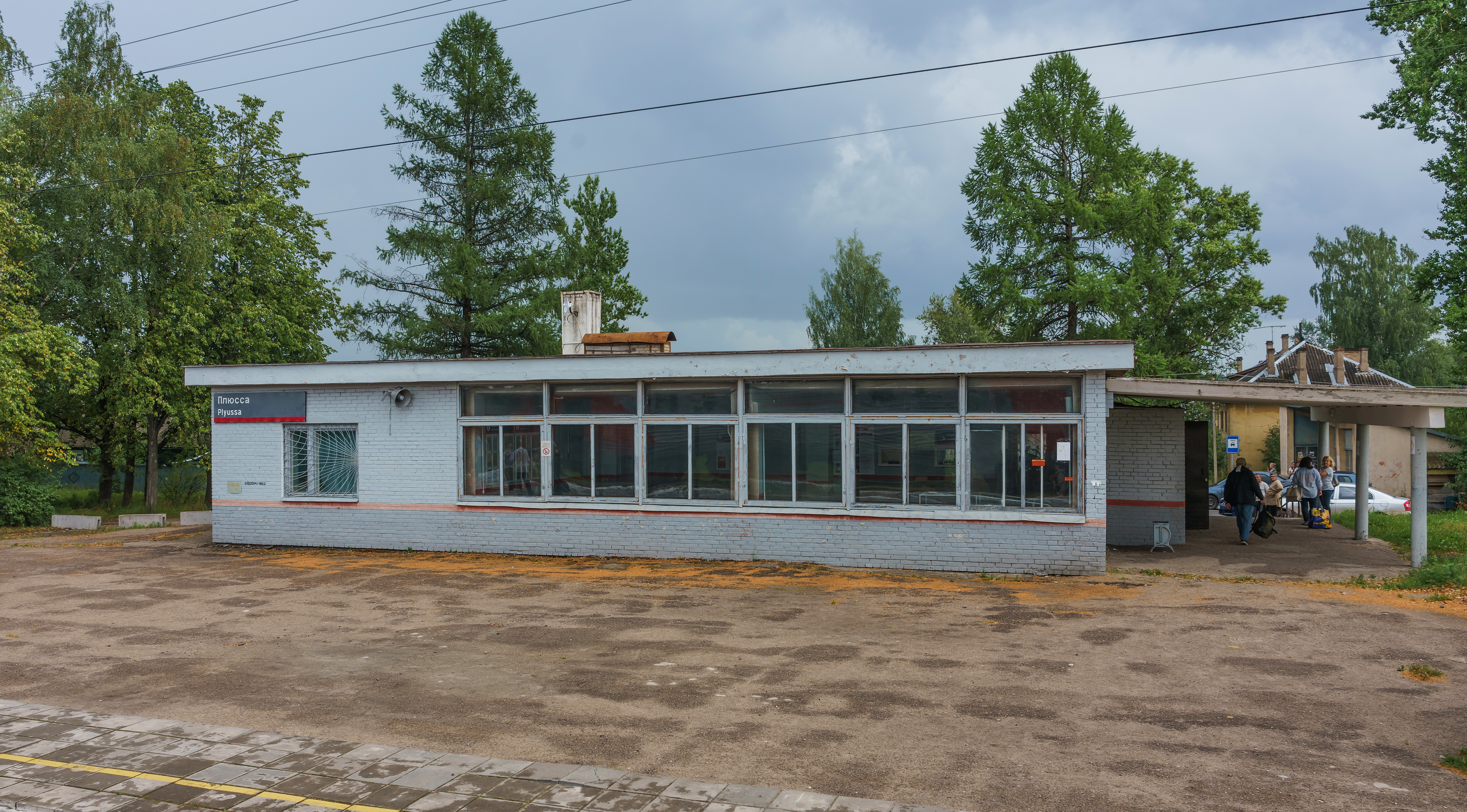
- Plyussa railway station, 2018
- Interactive map of Plyussa
- Location of Plyussa Plyussa (Pskov Oblast)
- Coordinates: 58°25′44″N 29°21′36″E
- Country: Russia
- Federal subject: Pskov Oblast
- Administrative district: Plyussky District
- Urban-type settlement status since: 1971

Population (2010 Census)
  - Total: 3,450
  - Estimate (2021): 2,424 (−29.7%)

Administrative status
  - Capital of: Plyussky District

Municipal status
  - Municipal district: Plyussky Municipal District
  - Urban settlement: Plyussa Urban Settlement
  - Capital of: Plyussky Municipal District, Plyussa Urban Settlement
- Time zone: UTC+3 (MSK)
- Postal code: 181000
- OKTMO ID: 58643151051

Plyussa (Russian: Плюсса) is an urban locality (a work settlement) and the administrative center of Plyussky District of Pskov Oblast, Russia, located 91 kilometers (57 mi) northeast of Pskov by the river Plyussa. Municipally, it is incorporated as Plyussa Urban Settlement, one of the two urban settlements in the district. Population: 3,450 (2010 census); 3,856 (2002 census); 4,317 (1989 Soviet census).

== History ==
The village of Plyussa was first mentioned in the end of the 16th century. The name is derived from the Plyussa River. In the 19th century, it belonged to Luzhsky Uyezd of Saint Petersburg Governorate. Between 1851 and 1862, the railway connecting Saint Petersburg and Warsaw via Pskov was built and crossed Luzhsky Uyezd. This facilitated economic development of the eastern part of the current area of the district. The settlement of Plyussa was founded as a railway station in 1859, and later was merged with the village. Until 1923, Plyussa was a part of Kotorskaya Volost, and in 1923, Plyusskaya Volost, with the administrative center in the selo of Lyushchik, was established.

On August 1, 1927, the uyezds were abolished, and Plyussky District was established, with the center in Plyussa. The governorates were abolished as well, and the district belonged to Luga Okrug of Leningrad Oblast. On July 23, 1930 the okrugs were abolished as well, and the districts became directly subordinate to the oblast. On January 1, 1932 Plyussky District was abolished and split between Luzhsky, Lyadsky, and Strugo-Krasnensky Districts. On February 15, 1935 the district was re-established. Between August, 1941, and February, 1944 Plyussa was occupied by German troops. On August 23, 1944, Plyussky District was transferred to newly established Pskov Oblast. In 1971, Plyussa was granted an urban-type settlement status.

== Economy ==
=== Industry ===
The economy of Plyussa is based on timber production.

=== Transportation ===
Plyussa is a station on the railway connecting St. Petersburg and Pskov. It is also connected by a road with the M20 highway which connects St. Petersburg and Pskov. There are also local roads.

== Culture and recreation ==
Plyussa contains two cultural heritage monuments classified as cultural and historical heritage of local significance. Both are monuments to soldiers fallen during World War II.
