= Zapolye, Permsky District, Perm Krai =

Zapolye Заполье
- Village
- Location within Perm Krai Location within Russia
- Coordinates: 57°54′N 55°52′E
- Country: Russia
- Region: Perm Krai
- District: Permsky District
- Time zone: UTC+5:00

Zapolye (Russian: Заполье) is a rural locality (a village) in Kultayevskoye Rural Settlement, Permsky District, Perm Krai, Russia. The population was 3 as of 2010. There are 34 streets.

== Geography ==
It is located 5.5 km north-west from Kultayevo.
