= Zapolye (Putinskoye Rural Settlement), Vereshchaginsky District, Perm Krai =

Zapolye Заполье
- Village
- Location within Perm Krai Location within Russia
- Coordinates: 58°06′N 54°04′E
- Country: Russia
- Region: Perm Krai
- District: Vereshchaginsky District
- Time zone: UTC+5:00

Zapolye (Russian: Заполье) is a rural locality (a village) in Vereshchaginsky District, Perm Krai, Russia. The population was 87 as of 2010.

== Geography ==
Zapolye is located 20 km west of Vereshchagino (the district's administrative centre) by road. Posad is the nearest rural locality.
