= Treaty of Bolotovo =

1348 treaty between Novgorod and Pskov

The Treaty of Bolotovo (Russian: Болотовский договор) was concluded in 1348 between the northwestern Russian cities of Novgorod the Great and Pskov and recognized Pskov's political independence from Novgorod. Up until that point, Pskov had, at least nominally, been part of the Novgorodian Land and subordinate to Novgorod, although it had invited in its own princes and been de facto independent for perhaps a century before that. Valentin Yanin argues Pskov became politically independent in 1329, but they had also invited several princes before, including Vsevolod Mstislavich (who had been in Novgorod before being dismissed in 1136) and the Lithuanian prince Dovmont (1266–1299).
