= Plyussky District =

Plyussky District Плюсский район (Russian)
- District
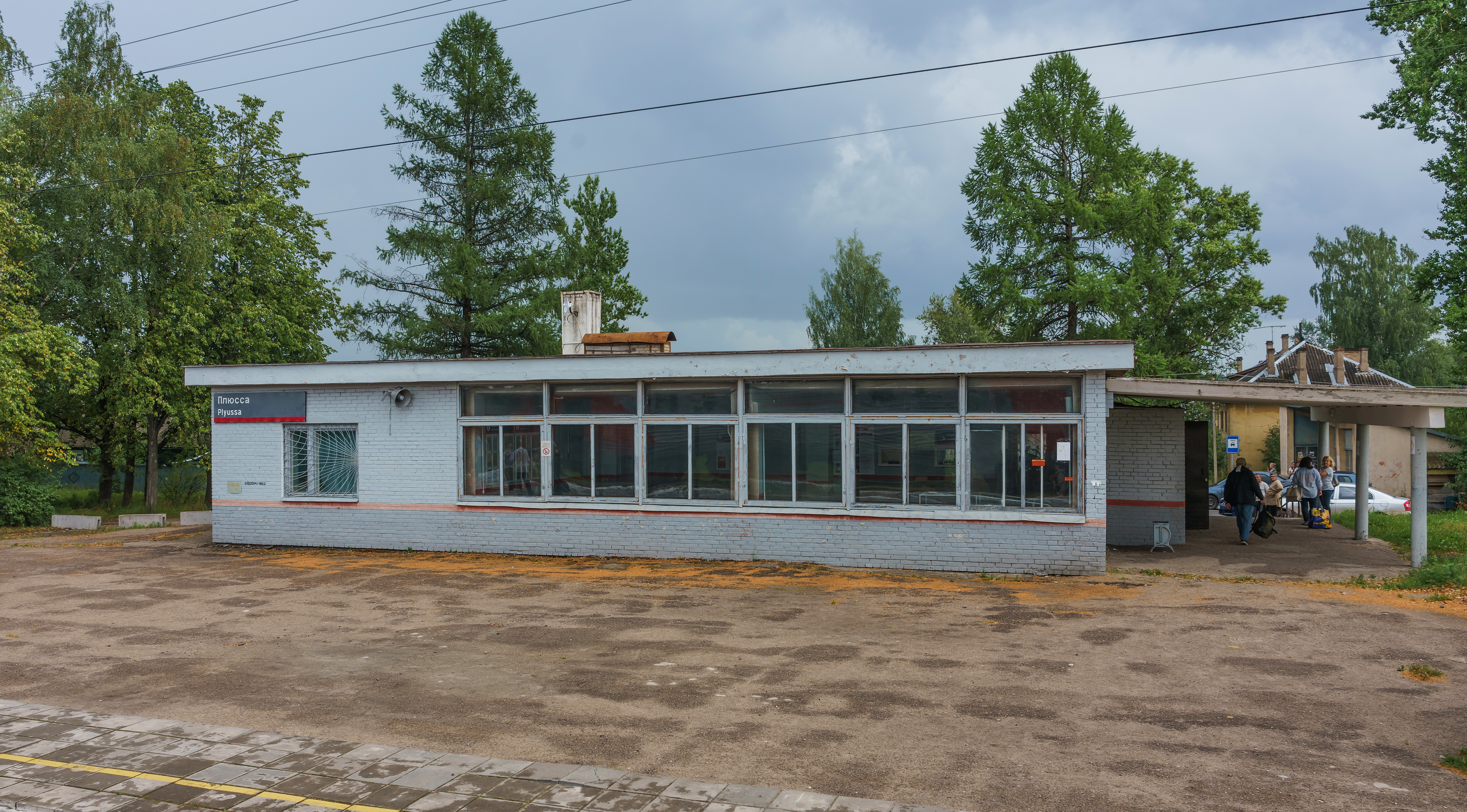
- Plyussa railway station

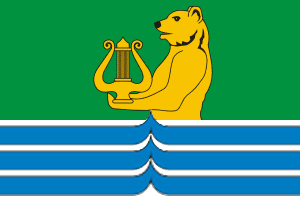
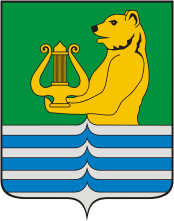
- Flag Coat of arms
- Location of Plyussky District in Pskov Oblast
- Coordinates: 58°26′N 29°22′E
- Country: Russia
- Federal subject: Pskov Oblast
- Established: August 1, 1927
- Administrative center: Plyussa

Area
  - Total: 2,767 km^{2} (1,068 sq mi)

Population (2010 Census)
  - Total: 9,187
  - Density: 3.320/km^{2} (8.599/sq mi)
  - Urban: 49.5%
  - Rural: 50.5%

Administrative structure
  - Inhabited localities: 2 urban-type settlements, 152 rural localities

Municipal structure
  - Municipally incorporated as: Plyussky Municipal District
  - Municipal divisions: 2 urban settlements, 3 rural settlements
- Time zone: UTC+3 (MSK)
- OKTMO ID: 58643000
- Website: http://pljussa.reg60.ru/

Plyussky District (Russian: Плю́сский райо́н) is an administrative and municipal district (raion), one of the twenty-four in Pskov Oblast, Russia. It is located in the northeast of the oblast and borders with Slantsevsky District of Leningrad Oblast in the north, Luzhsky District of Leningrad Oblast in the northeast, Shimsky District of Novgorod Oblast in the east, Strugo-Krasnensky District in the south, and with Gdovsky District in the west. The area of the district is 2,767 square kilometers (1,068 sq mi). Its administrative center is the urban locality (a work settlement) of Plyussa. Population: 9,187 (2010 census); 11,610 (2002 Census); 13,988 (1989 Soviet census). The population of Plyussa accounts for 37.6% of the district's total population.

== Geography ==
The district is elongated from northwest to southeast. The main river is the Plyussa, a right tributary of the Narva. The whole district lies in the basin of the Plyussa. The principal tributaries of the Plyussa within the district are the Lyuta, the Kureya, the Omuga, the Yanya, the Verduga, and the Paguba. Most significant lakes include Lakes Pesno, Chyornoye, Zaplyusskoye, Uzhovo, and Apalevo.

== History ==
Until the 15th century, the area was a part of the Novgorod Republic. In the 12th century, the Antonov Monastery was founded and eventually grew to become a major landowner in the area. After the fall of the republic, it was, together will all Novgorod lands, annexed by the Grand Duchy of Moscow. It was a part of Shelonskaya Pyatina, one of the five pyatinas into which Novgorod lands were divided. In the course of the administrative reform carried out in 1708 by Peter the Great, it was included into Ingermanland Governorate (known since 1710 as Saint Petersburg Governorate). The current territory of the district was split between Gdovsky Uyezd (west) and Luzhsky Uyezd (east). Between 1851 and 1862, the railway connecting St. Petersburg and Warsaw via Pskov was built and crossed Luzhsky Uyezd. This facilitated economic development of what now is the eastern part of the district. The settlement of Plyussa was founded as a railway station. The western part did not have direct transport connections with big cities and remained underdeveloped.

On August 1, 1927, the uyezds were abolished, and Plyussky District was established, with the administrative center in the settlement of Plyussa. It included parts of former Luzhsky Uyezd. The governorates were abolished as well, and the district became a part of Luga Okrug of Leningrad Oblast. On July 23, 1930, the okrugs were also abolished and the districts were directly subordinated to the oblast. On January 1, 1932, Plyussky District was abolished and split between Luzhsky, Lyadsky, and Strugo-Krasnensky Districts. On February 15, 1935, the district was re-established. Between August 1941 and February 1944, Plyussky District was occupied by German troops. On August 23, 1944, Plyussky District was transferred to newly established Pskov Oblast.

On August 1, 1927, Lyadsky District was established as well, with the administrative center in the selo of Lyady. It included parts of former Gdovsky and Luzhsky Uyezds. The district was a part of Luga Okrug of Leningrad Oblast. Between August 1941 and February 1944, Lyadsky District was occupied by German troops. On August 23, 1944, the district was transferred to Pskov Oblast. On October 3, 1959, Lyadsky District was abolished and split between Plyussky and Gdovsky Districts.

== Economy ==
=== Industry ===
The industry of the district is based on timber and peat production.

=== Agriculture ===
The main agricultural specializations in the district are cattle breeding (with milk and meat production) and potato growing. Additionally, the district specializes in eggs production and growing of crops, vegetables, and flax.

=== Transportation ===
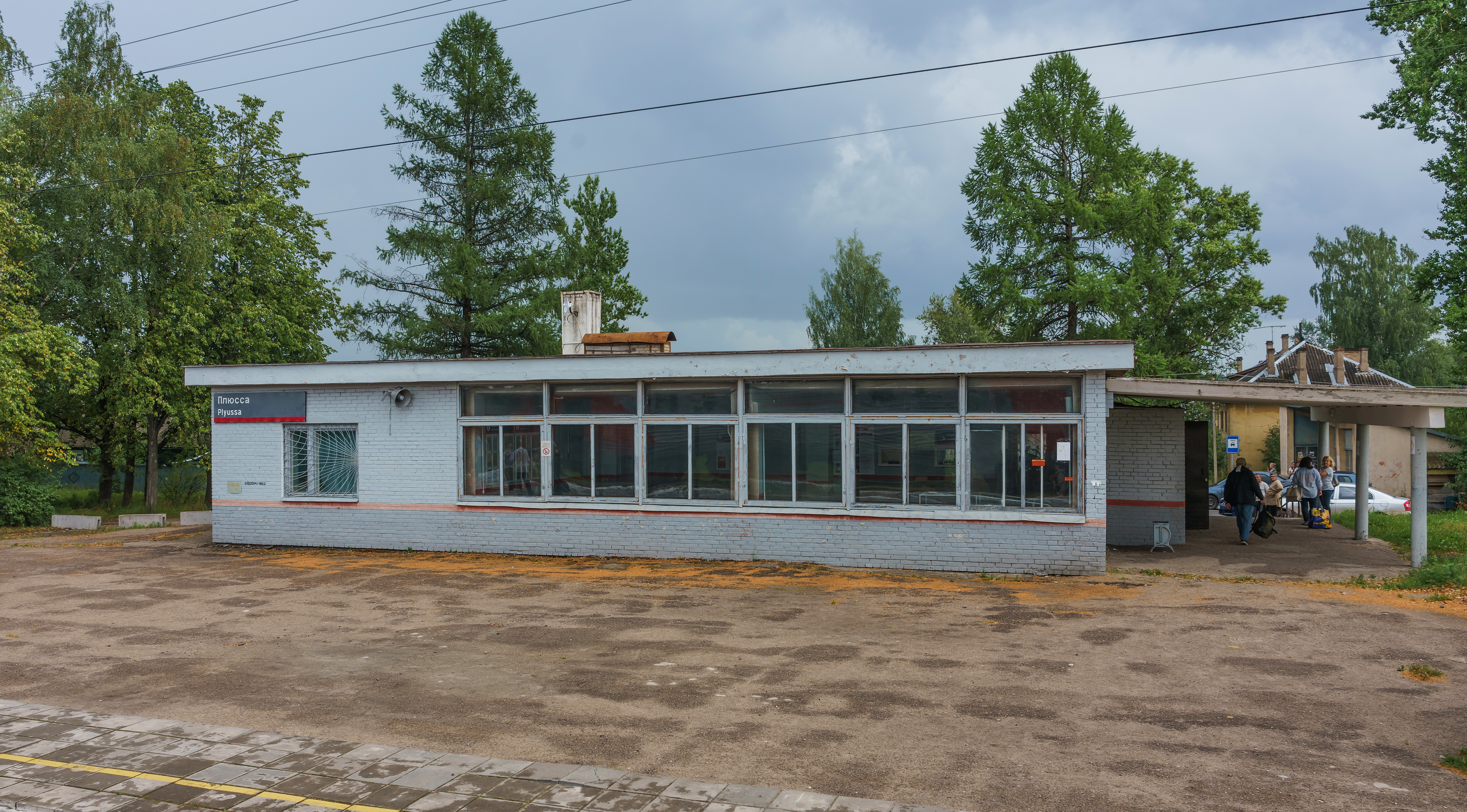
Plyussa railway station, 2018

A railway connecting St. Petersburg and Pskov crosses the district from north to south. Plyussa is the principal railway station within the district.

The M20 highway, which connects St. Petersburg and Pskov, crosses the eastern part of the district as well. Plyussa is connected by road with the highway. There are also local roads.

== Culture and recreation ==
The district contains fifteen cultural heritage monuments of federal significance and additionally fifty-nine objects classified as cultural and historical heritage of local significance. Seven of the federal monuments are archeological sites. The others are the Margarita Yamshchikova estate "Log" in the village of Lositsy, ruins of the Vechashi estate in the village of Zapolye, the Rimsky-Korsakov estate "Lyubensk" in the village of Kotorsk, and wooden St. Nicholas Church in the village of Zayanye.

Margarita Yamshchikova, an author using an alias of Al. Altayev, owned an estate in the village of Lositsy. The house is currently a museum.

Nikolai Rimsky-Korsakov, a notable composer, owned two estates currently within the limits of the district, and lived there in 1894–1905 and from 1907 until his death in 1908.
