= Pyatina =

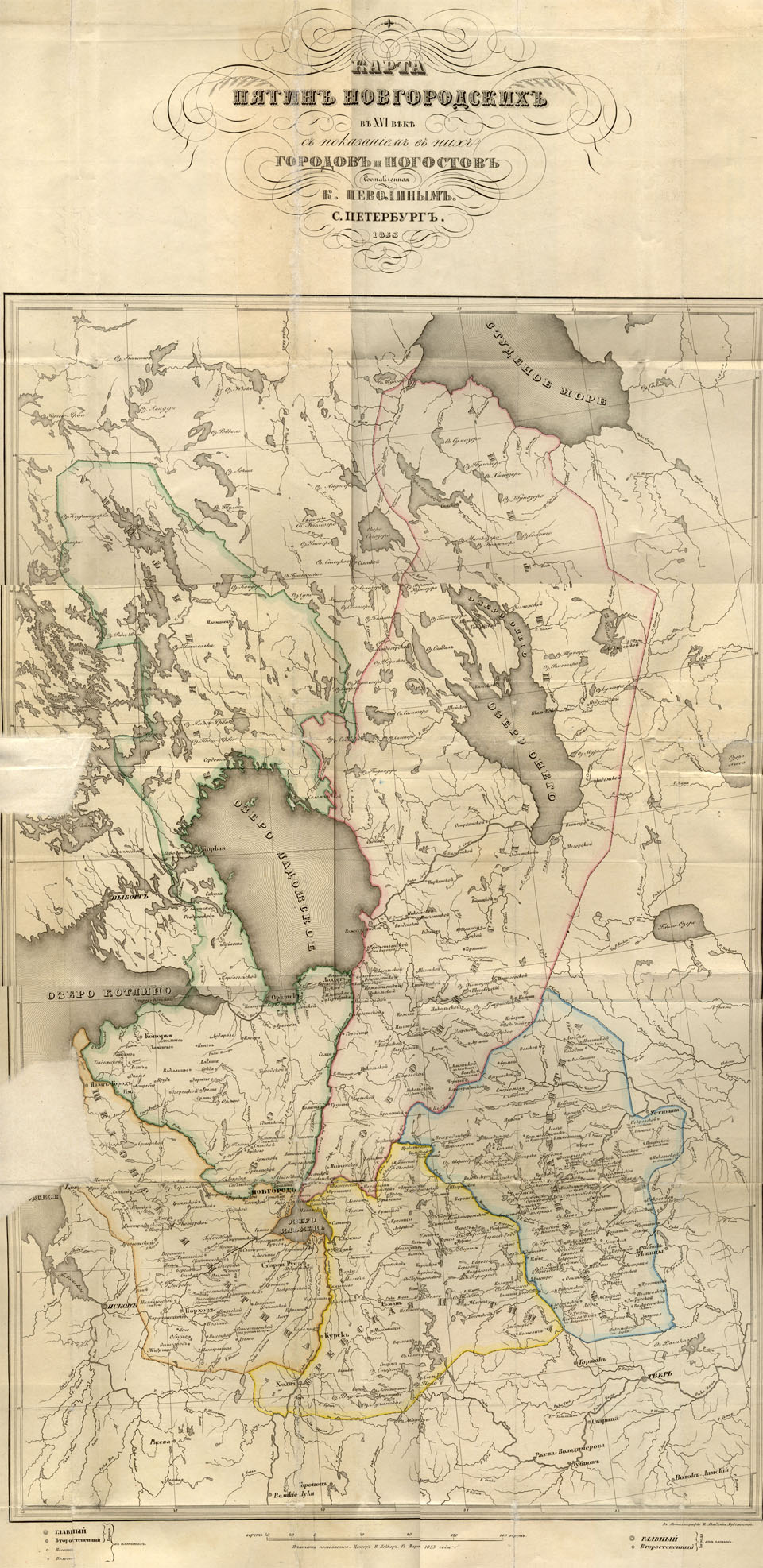
Pyatinas in the 16th century.

Pyatina (Russian: пятина) was a first-level unit of administrative division of Novgorod Land. The name pyatina originates from the word Russian: пять 'five'. Novgorod Land was subdivided into five pyatinas. The division was first mentioned in the end of the 15th century and was in use after Novgorod was taken over by the Grand Duchy of Moscow. It is unclear whether the division existed in the Novgorod Republic. The division into pyatinas was abolished in the 18th century, after the governorates were established.

The five pyatinas were

- Vodskaya Pyatina to the north and northwest of Novgorod (the left bank of the Volkhov River). Named after the Votic people. It included parts of Novgorod and Leningrad Oblasts and the Republic of Karelia, as well as parts of Finland.
- Obonezhskaya Pyatina to the northeast of Novgorod, on the right bank of the Volkhov. This pyatina continued north to Lake Onega and further to the White Sea. It included parts of Novgorod, Leningrad, Vologda, and Arkhangelsk Oblasts, and the Republic of Karelia.
- Shelonskaya Pyatina to the southwest of Novgorod, along the Shelon River. It included parts of Novgorod, Pskov, and Leningrad Oblasts.
- Derevskaya Pyatina to the east and southeast of Novgorod. It included parts of Novgorod and Tver Oblasts.
- Bezhetskaya Pyatina to the east of Novgorod, between Derevskaya and Obonezhskaya pyatinas. It included parts of Novgorod, Vologda, and Tver Oblasts.

Four of the five pyatinas (with the exception of Bezhetskaya Pyatina) were adjacent to the city of Novgorod. The corresponding quarters of Novgorod served as the administrative centers of these pyatinas.
