= Smerd =

Serf in the medieval Slavic states of Central and East Europe

A smerd (Old East Slavic: смердъ, romanized: smerdǔ) was a free peasant and later a feudal-dependent serf in the medieval Slavic states of East Europe. Sources from the 11th and 12th centuries (such as the 12th-century Russkaya Pravda) mention their presence in Kievan Rus' and Poland as the smerdones. Etymologically, the word smerd comes from a common Indo-European root meaning "ordinary man" or "dependent man".

In Kievan Rus', smerdy were peasants who gradually lost their freedom (partially or completely) and whose legal status differed from group to group. Unlike slaves, they had their own property and had to pay fines for their delinquencies, legally the smerds never possessed full rights; killing of a smerd was punished by the same fine as killing of a kholop (similarly to a slave). The property of the deceased was inherited by the knyaz (prince). The Russkaya Pravda forbade torturing smerds during court examination without consent of the knyaz.

During the 12th and the 13th centuries a number of sources mention the smerdy while narrating events in Halych-Volynia and in Novgorod. It appears that during this period the term smerd encompassed the whole rural population of a given region. Sources of the 14th and 15th centuries refer to smerds of Novgorod and Pskov as peasant-proprietors, who possessed lands collectively (communes) or individually and had the right to freely alienate their own allotments. However, their personal freedom was limited: they were forbidden to seek a new master or princely patronage. The knyaz could not accept complaints from smerds against their master. Also, smerds had to provide labor services and to pay tribute (dan') to the benefit of the city as a collective feudal master.

In Russia from the 14th century the word smerd as a denotation for peasants and other commonfolk was replaced with the word krestyanin (крестьянин), meaning peasant. The change was connected to the dying out of Slavic paganism by that time, as well as to the Islamization of the Golden Horde under Öz Beg Khan (ruled 1313–1341), which fostered the rise of Christian self-identification in the vassal Russian lands that were under Mongol yoke.

The old word smerd continued to be used in a pejorative meaning, often in a situation when a lord spoke to dependent people or even to lesser nobles. Also the word acquired a meaning of "one who stinks", with the related verb 'smerdet' (смердеть or śmierdzieć, to stink).

== See also ==
- Villein
- Serfdom
