= List of rural localities in Pskov Oblast =

Map of Russia with Pskov Oblast highlighted

This is a list of rural localities in Pskov Oblast, Russia. Pskov Oblast is a federal subject of Russia (an oblast). Pskov Oblast (Russian: Пско́вская о́бласть, Pskóvskaya óblast') is a federal subject of Russia (an oblast), located in the west of the country. Its administrative center is the city of Pskov. As of the 2010 Census, its population was 673,423. Pskov Oblast borders the countries of Estonia, Latvia, and Belarus. It is the westernmost federal subject of contiguous Russia (i.e. excluding the exclave of Kaliningrad Oblast), and one of the only two bordering with three countries.

== Gdovsky District ==
Rural localities in Gdovsky District:

- Apalyovo
- Blyansk
- Dragotina
- Glush
- Kunest
- Lunevshchina
- Potrekhnovo
- Samolva
- Strektovo
- Uldiga
- Vetvenik
- Yamm
- Yushkino
- Yushkinskaya Volost

== Novorzhevsky District ==
Rural localities in Novorzhevsky District:

- Davydkovo

== Opochetsky District ==
Rural localities in Opochetsky District:

- Abrosimovo

== Ostrovsky District ==
Rural localities in Ostrovsky District:

- Avdyatovo

== Palkinsky District ==
Rural localities in Palkinsky District:

- Sharanski

== Pechorsky District ==
Rural localities in Pechorsky District:

- Dubki
- Izborsk
- Lavry

== Plyussky District ==
Rural localities in Plyussky District:

- Bolshoye Zakhonye
- Kotoshi
- Lositsy
- Maryinsko
- Serbino
- Trosno

== Pskovsky District ==
Rural localities in Pskovsky District:

- Abrosovo
- Abryushino
- Borovik

== Pytalovsky District ==
Rural localities in Pytalovsky District:

- Vyshgorodok

== Sebezhsky District ==
Rural localities in Sebezhsky District:

- Zasitino

== Strugo-Krasnensky District ==
Rural localities in Strugo-Krasnensky District:

- Mayakovo
- Mogutovo
- Simansky Log
- Uzmino
- Vladimirsky Lager

== Velikoluksky District ==
Rural localities in Velikoluksky District:

- Grebly
- Krivandino
- Mikhalki
- Pereslegino

== See also ==
- Lists of rural localities in Russia
