= Davydkovo =

Davydkovo is the name of several localities in Russia:

- Davydkovo, Pskov Oblast
- Davydkovo, Krasnoborsky District, Arkhangelsk Oblast
- Davydkovo, Sheksninsky District, Vologda Oblast
- Davydkovo, Syamzhensky District, Vologda Oblast
- Davydkovo, Totemsky District, Vologda Oblast
- Davydkovo, Vologodsky District, Vologda Oblast
