= Kunest =

Kunest Кунесть
- Village
- Interactive map of Kunest
- Location of Kunest Kunest (Pskov Oblast)
- Coordinates: 58°37′N 27°49′E
- Country: Russia
- Federal subject: Pskov Oblast
- Administrative district: Gdovsky District
- VolostSelsoviet: Yushkinskaya Volost
- Founded: 1745
- Elevation: 101 m (331 ft)

Population
  - Estimate (2010): 15 )
- Time zone: UTC+3 (MSK)
- Postal code: 181606
- Dialing code: +7 811
- OKTMO ID: 58608444186

Kunest (Russian: Куне́сть) is a small rural locality in Gdovsky District of Pskov Oblast, Russia. It's located near the shore of Lake Peipus which borders Estonia. The population was around 25 in 2016. The nearby village of Gorka ('a small mountain' in Russian) is often considered to be a part of Kunest, from which it's only separated by the Kuna river. The colloquial name of Gorka is Zareche ('behind the river'). Together with Gorka, the population may be slightly more than 50.

Locals identify as Skobars and speak the Lake Peipus dialect in addition to Standard Russian.

Although remote and hardly accessible, this area attracts some tourists and dachniks (owners of seasonal second homes, usually log cabins or small cottages) due to its untouched nature, ecology, traditional way of life and some objects of cultural and historical heritage of local significance. The quality of rural roads is very poor and in winter and rainy seasons it is hard to reach the village and nearby settlements with an ordinary car.

== Administrative and municipal status ==
Within the framework of administrative divisions, Kunest is a village (derevnya) in the municipal rural settlement of Yushkinskaya Volost, to which it is directly subordinated. The seat of the volost is located in the village of Yushkino, 14 kilometers away from Kunest.

The village is included into the border security zone, intended to protect the borders of Russia from unwanted activity. Formally, a permit issued by the local Federal Security Service department is required to visit Kunest. However, there are no officials in the village or around it and access is never controlled.

== History ==
=== Etymology ===
The name of the village is believed to have a Finnic origin, probably meaning 'a place with frogs' (konn means frog in modern Estonian).

== Economy ==
Most people in Kunest depend on land, growing fruits and vegetables, fishing and picking berries and mushrooms.

The village is served by avtolavkas (Russian: автола́вка), trucks with essential goods which arrive from the nearest town of Gdov once in a week or two and stay for around thirty minutes on the village green.

== Gallery ==
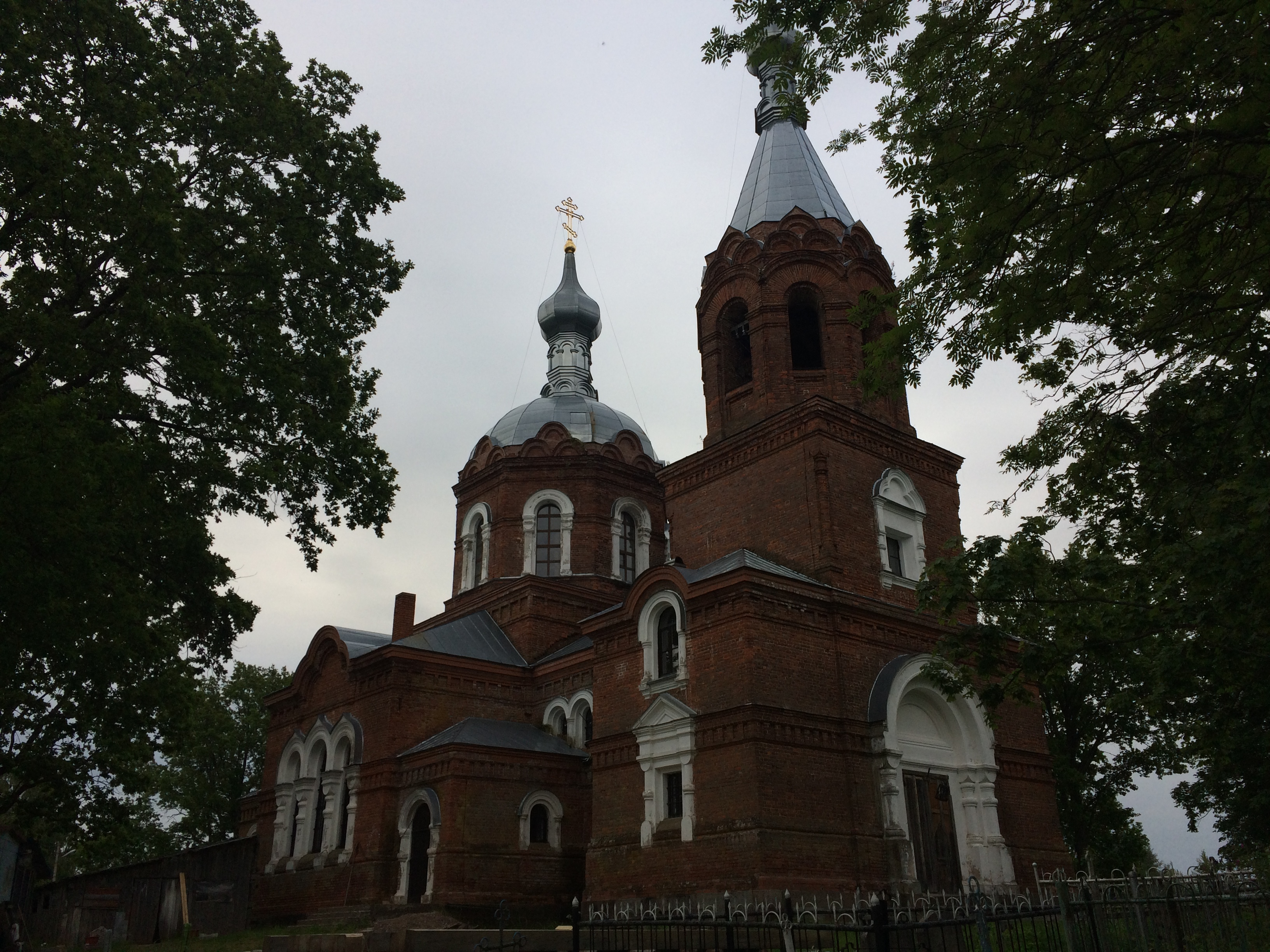

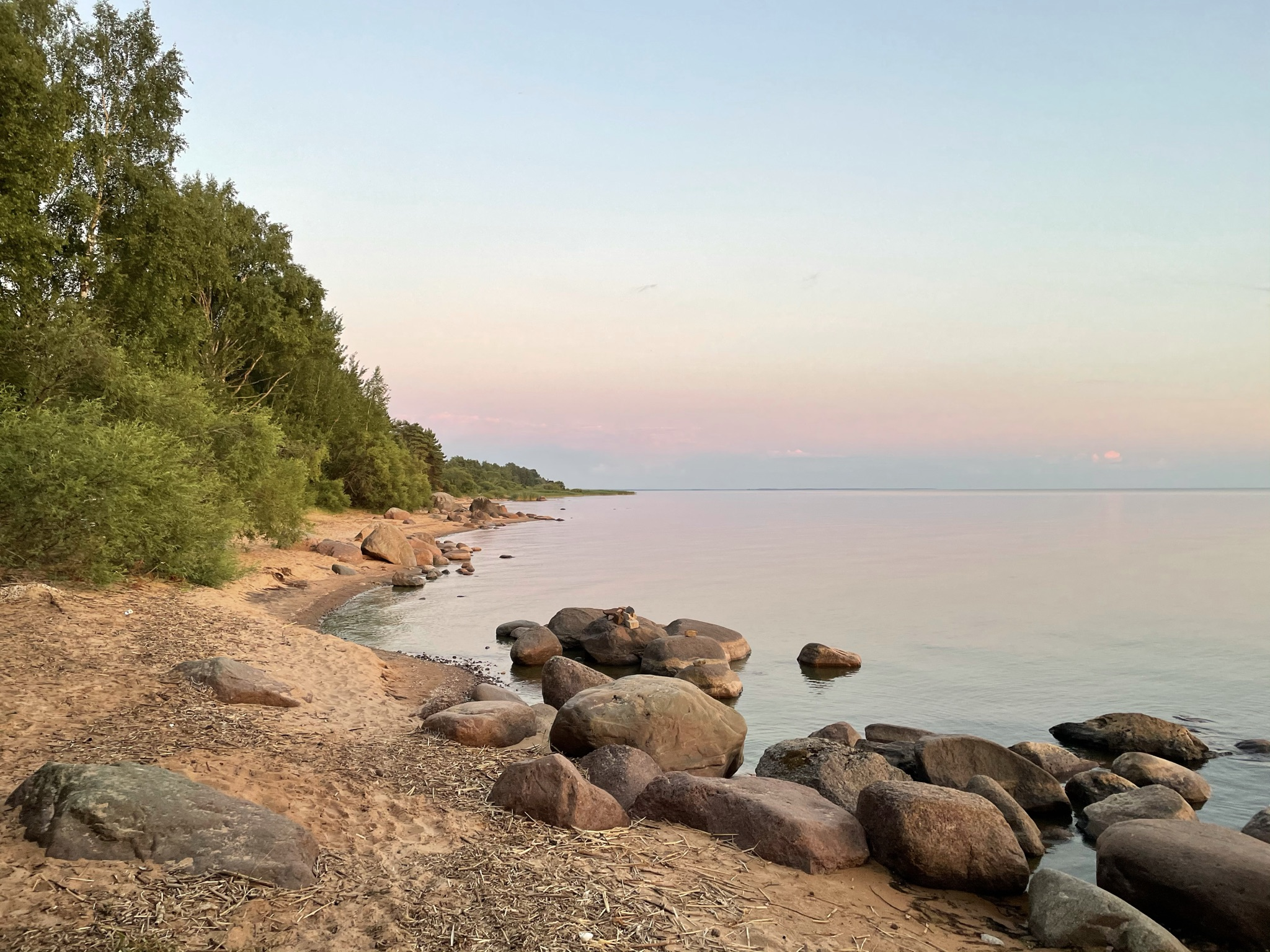

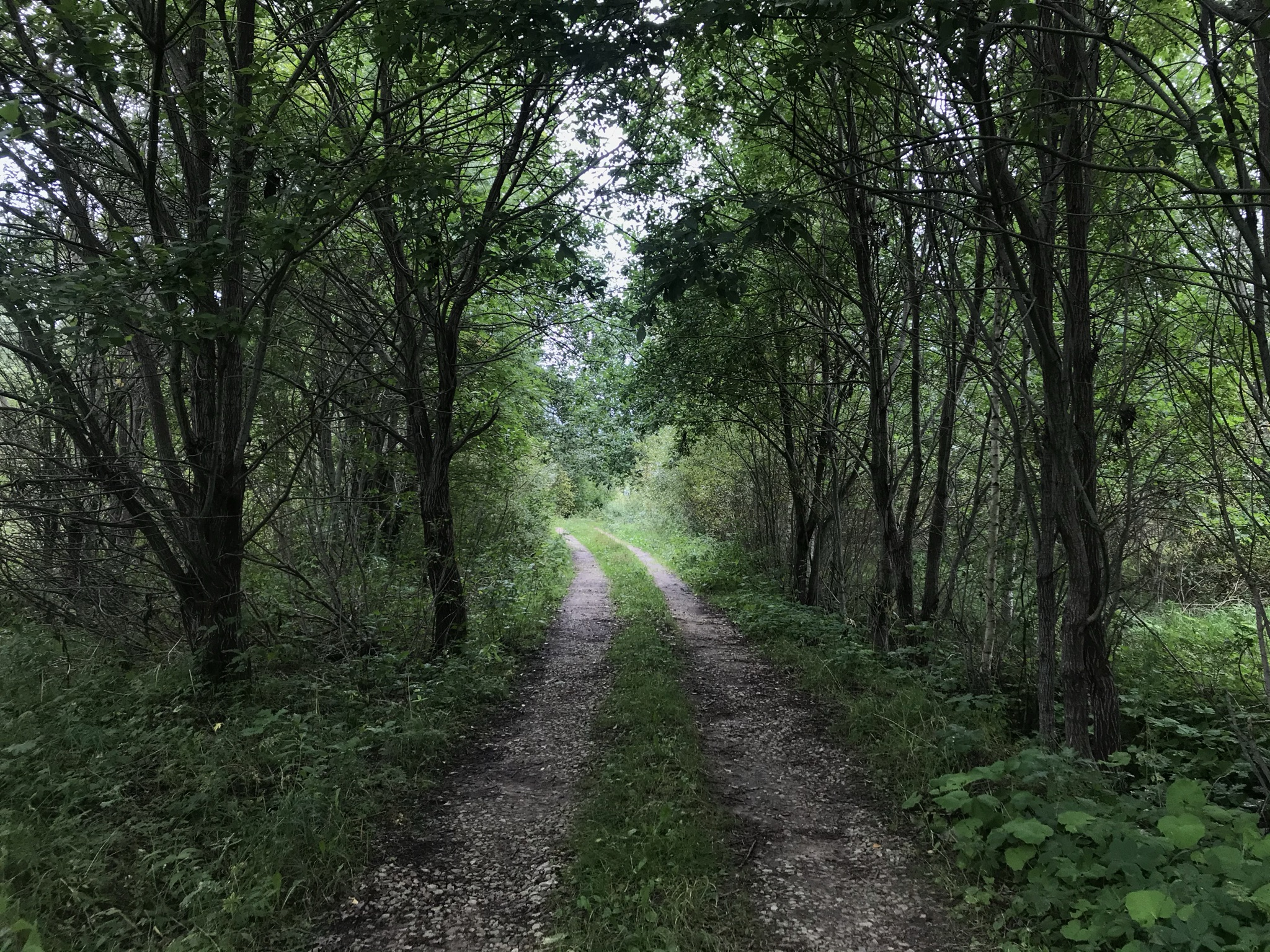

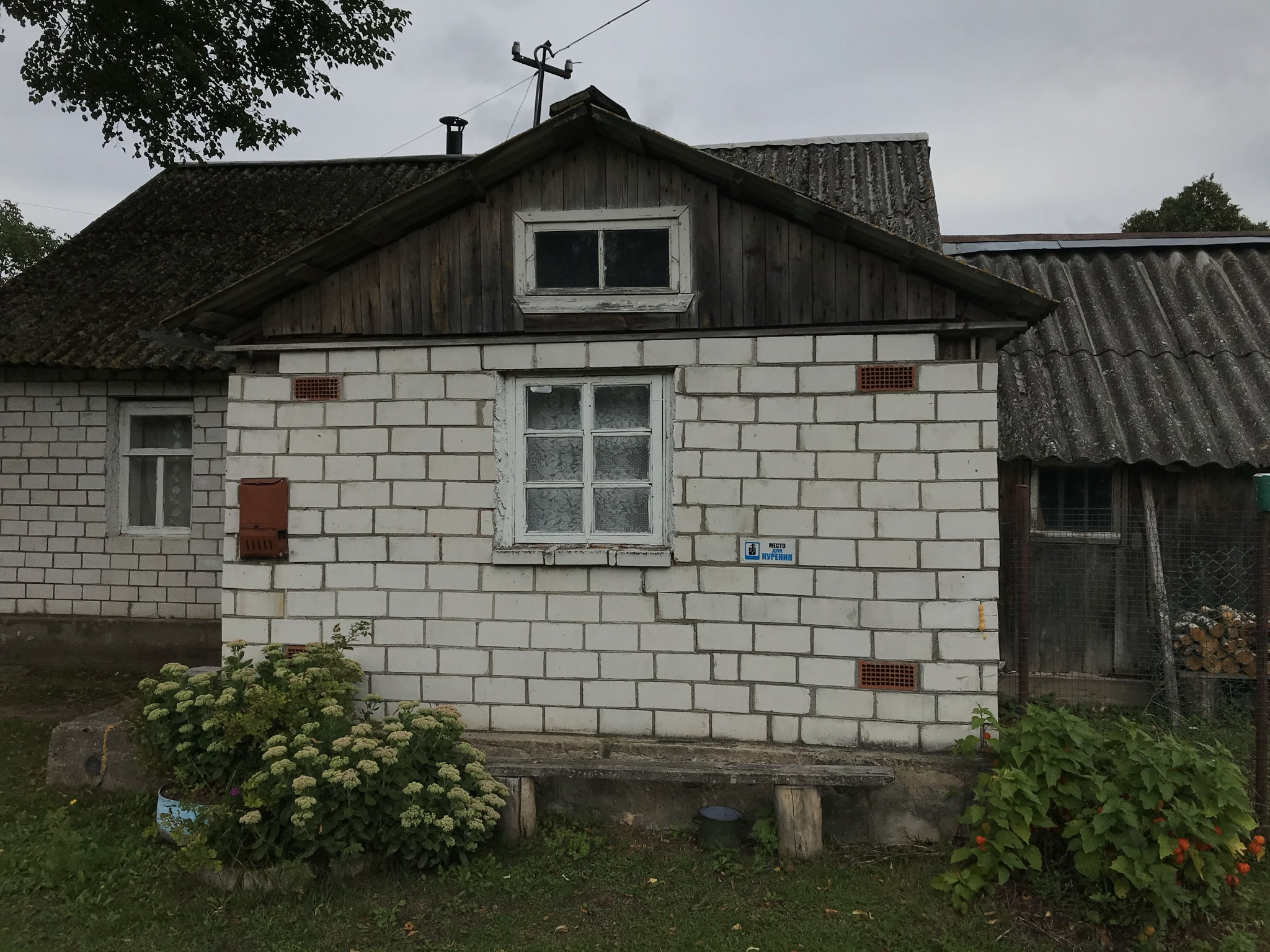

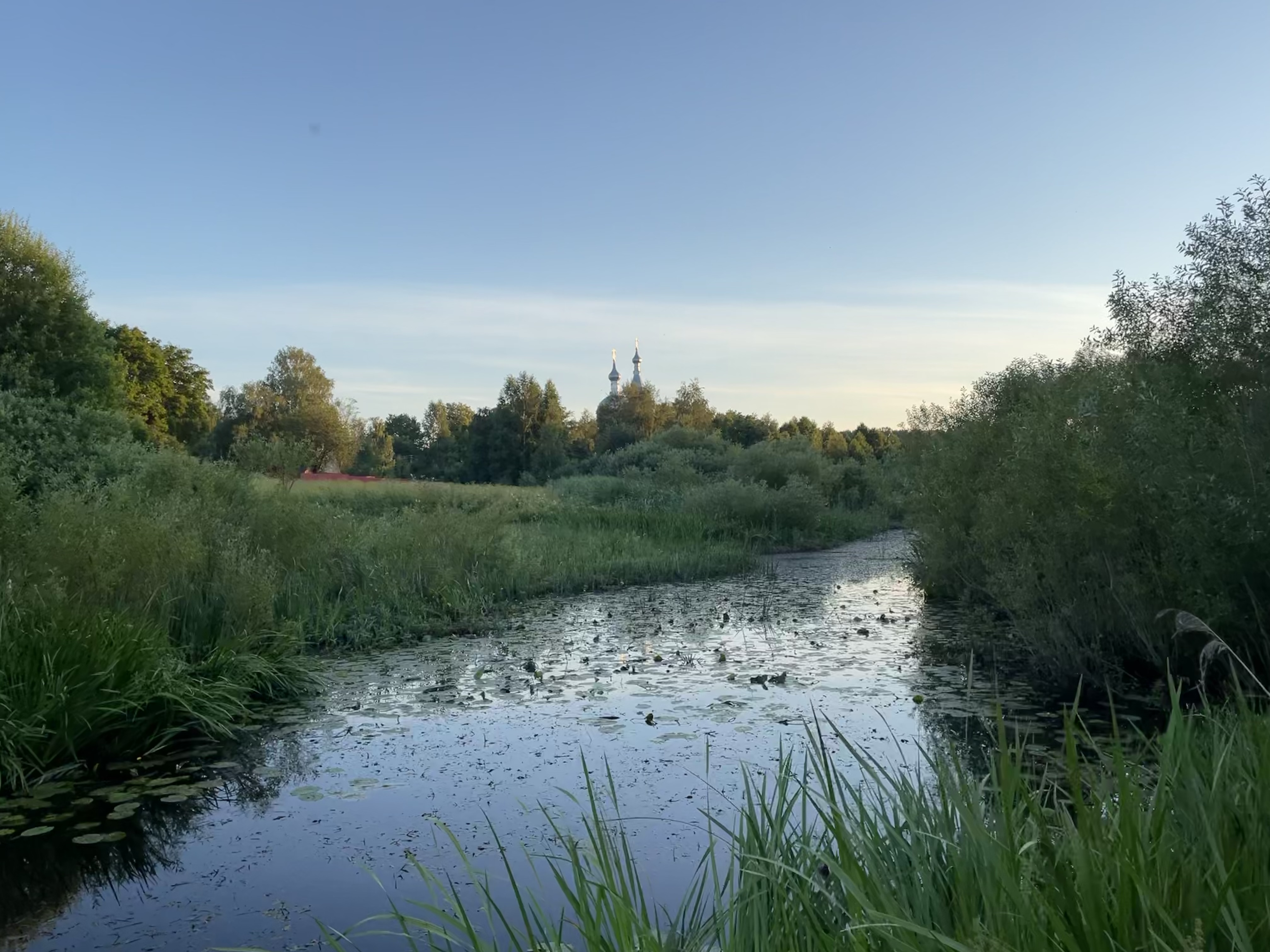

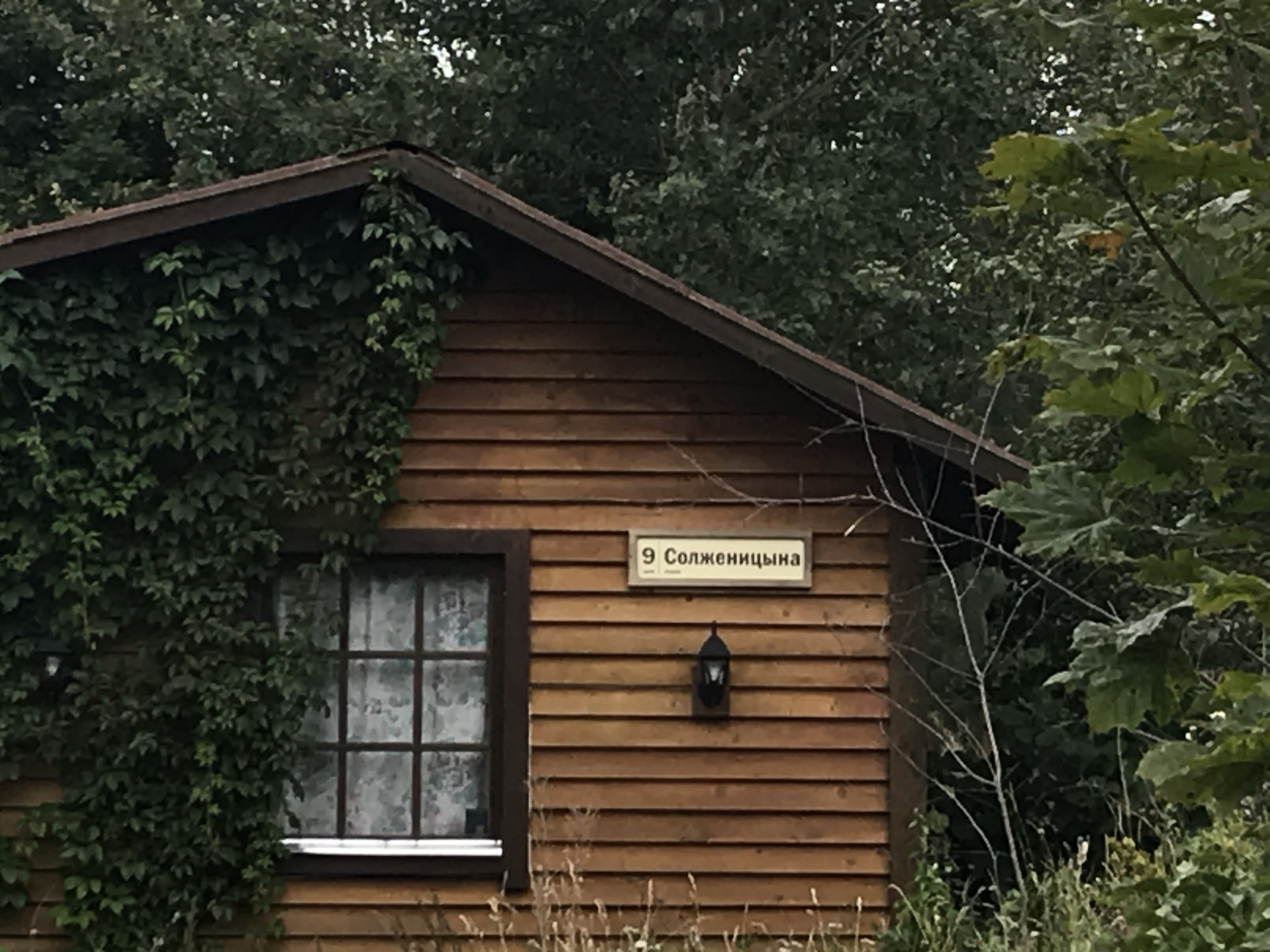

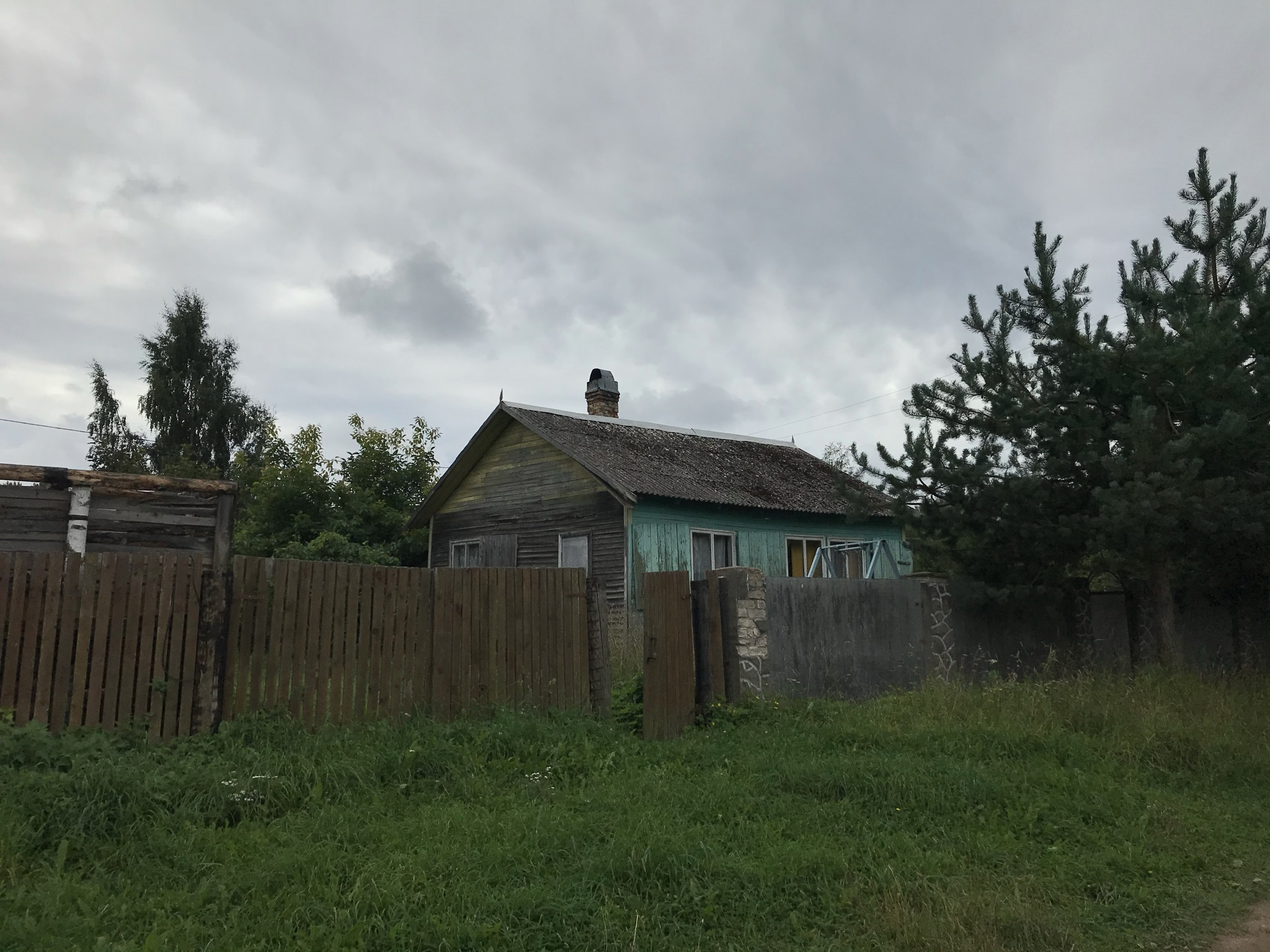

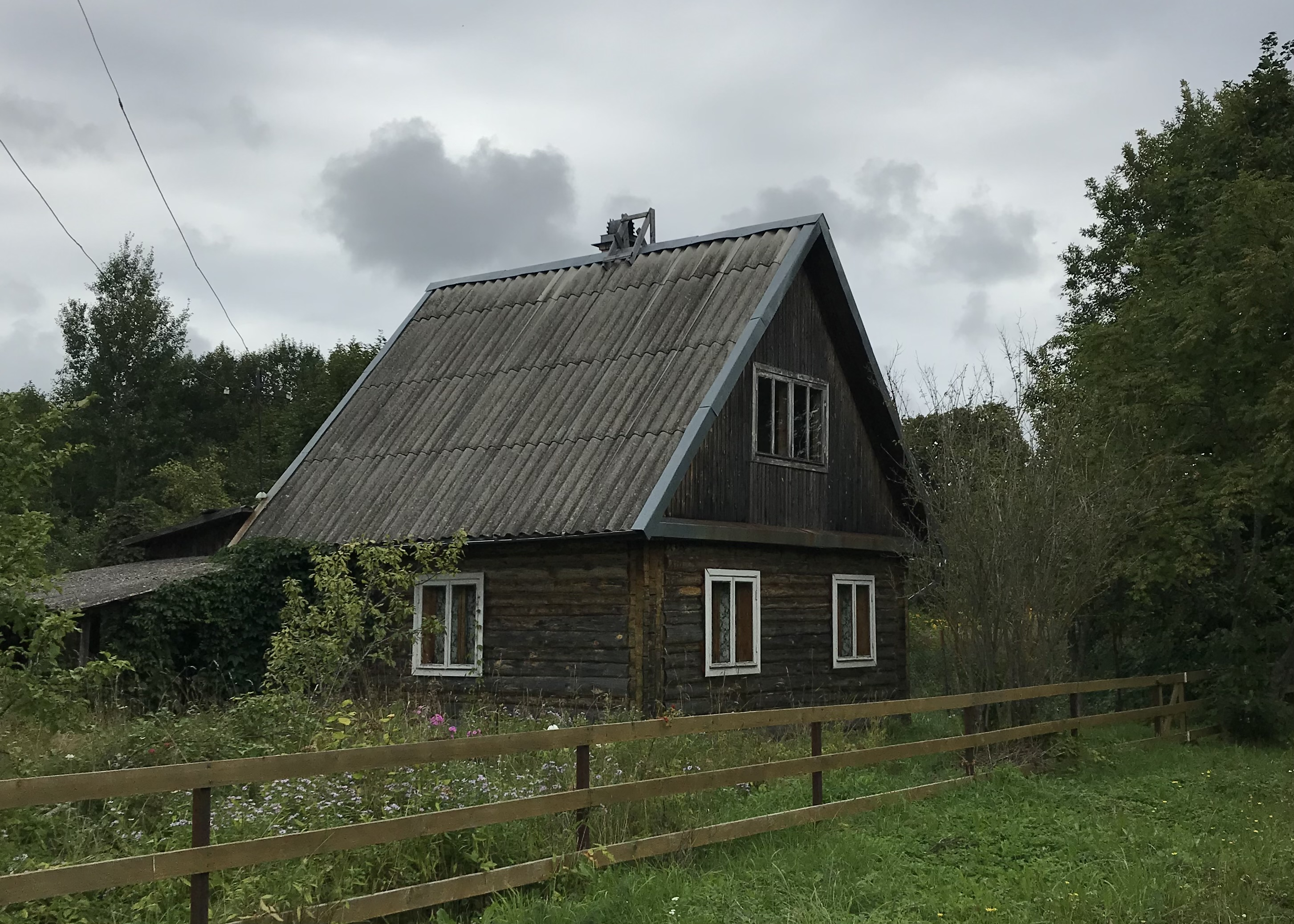
