= Lunevshchina =

Lunevshchina may refer to:

- Lunevshchina, Gdovsky District, Pskov Oblast, a village in Gdovsky District of Pskov Oblast, Russia
- Lunevshchina, Gdov, Pskov Oblast, a village under jurisdiction of the town of Gdov, Pskov Oblast, Russia
