= Apalyovo =

Apalyovo (Russian: Апалёво), or Apalevo, is the name of several rural localities in Russia:

- Apalyovo, Pskov Oblast, a village in Gdovsky District of Pskov Oblast
- Apalyovo, Tver Oblast, a village in Itomlya Rural Settlement of Rzhevsky District of Tver Oblast
