= Krivandino =

Krivandino may refer to:

- Krivandino, Novosokolnichesky District, Pskov Oblast, a village in Novosokolnichesky District of Pskov Oblast, Russia
- Krivandino, Velikoluksky District, Pskov Oblast, a village in Velikoluksky District of Pskov Oblast, Russia
- Krivandino, name of several other rural localities in Russia
