= Princess Olga Pskov International Airport =

Airport in Pskov Oblast, Russia

Princess Olga Pskov Airport Pskov-Kresty Аэропорт Псков имени княгини Ольги

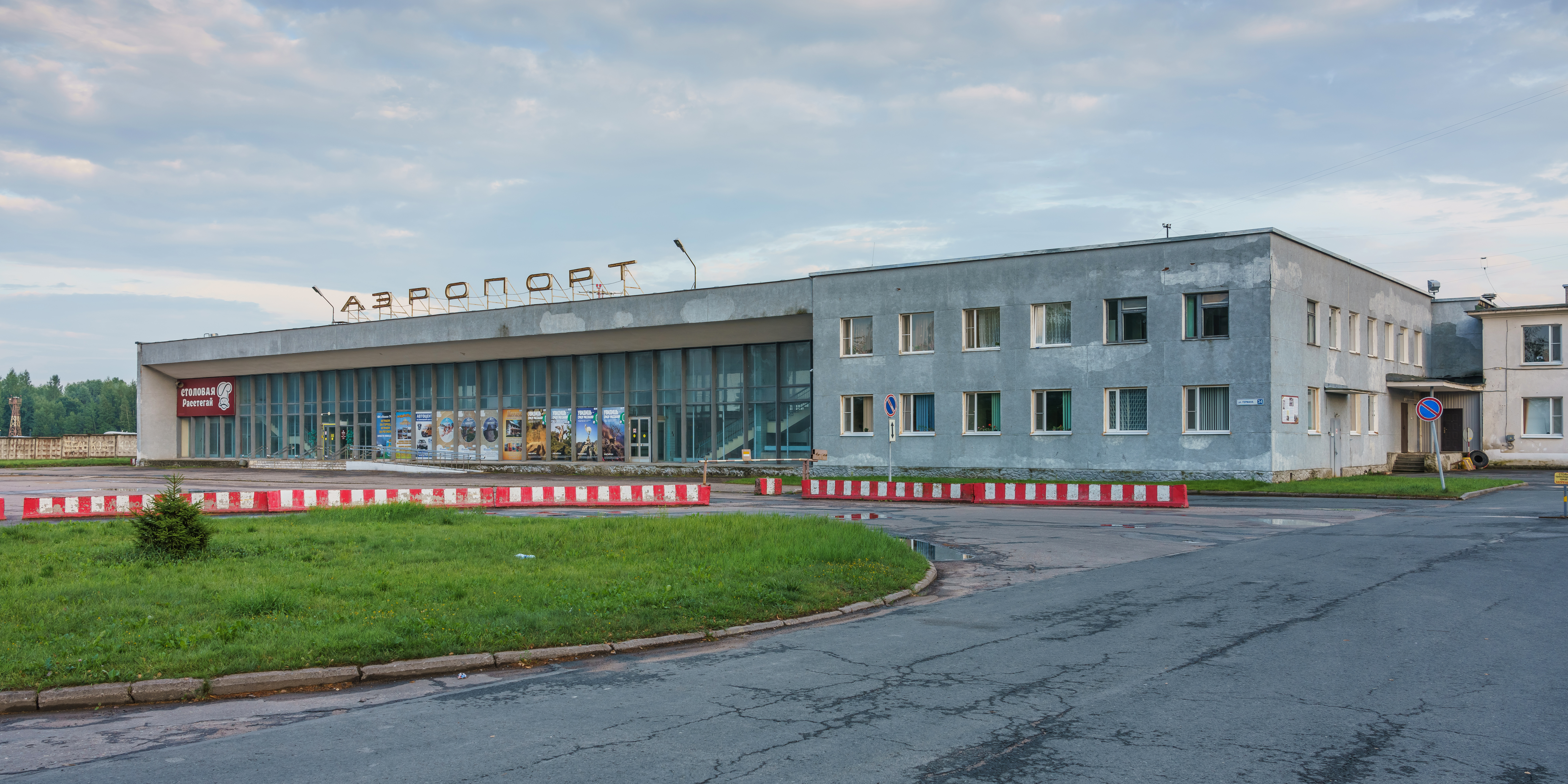
- IATA: PKV; ICAO: ULOO

Summary
- Airport type: Military / Public
- Operator: Pskovavia
- Location: Pskov, Pskov Oblast, Russia
- Elevation AMSL: 154 ft (47 m)
- Coordinates: 57°47′6″N 28°23′54″E
- Website: pskovavia.ru

Map
- Location of airport in Pskov Oblast Princess Olga Pskov Airport; Pskov-Kresty (Russia)

Runways
Direction	Length		Surface
Direction	m	ft	Surface
01/19	2,514	8,248	Concrete

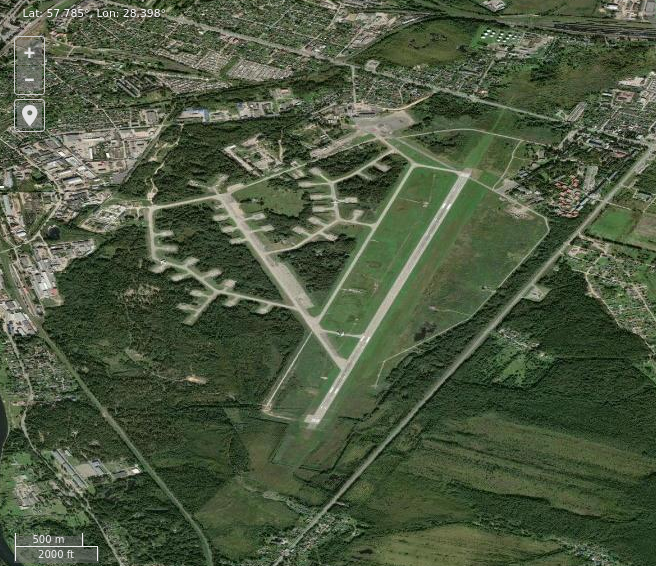
Satellite imagery of Princess Olga Pskov International Airport

Princess Olga Pskov International Airport (Russian: Международный аэропорт Псков имени княгини Ольги) (IATA: PKV, ICAO: ULOO) is an airfield in Pskov Oblast, Russia, located 6 km (3.7 mi) southeast of Pskov. It has been used for many decades as a military airbase and has had periods of time in which it was also utilized as a commercial airport.

It is a medium air base with 27 large revetments in a complex, sprawling taxiway layout and home to the 334th Military Transport Aviation Regiment as part of the 12th Military Transport Aircraft Division of Military Transport Aviation which flies the Ilyushin Il-76. The civilian terminal area services up to 13 medium/large planes and 20 small planes. There is no instrument landing capability.

== History ==
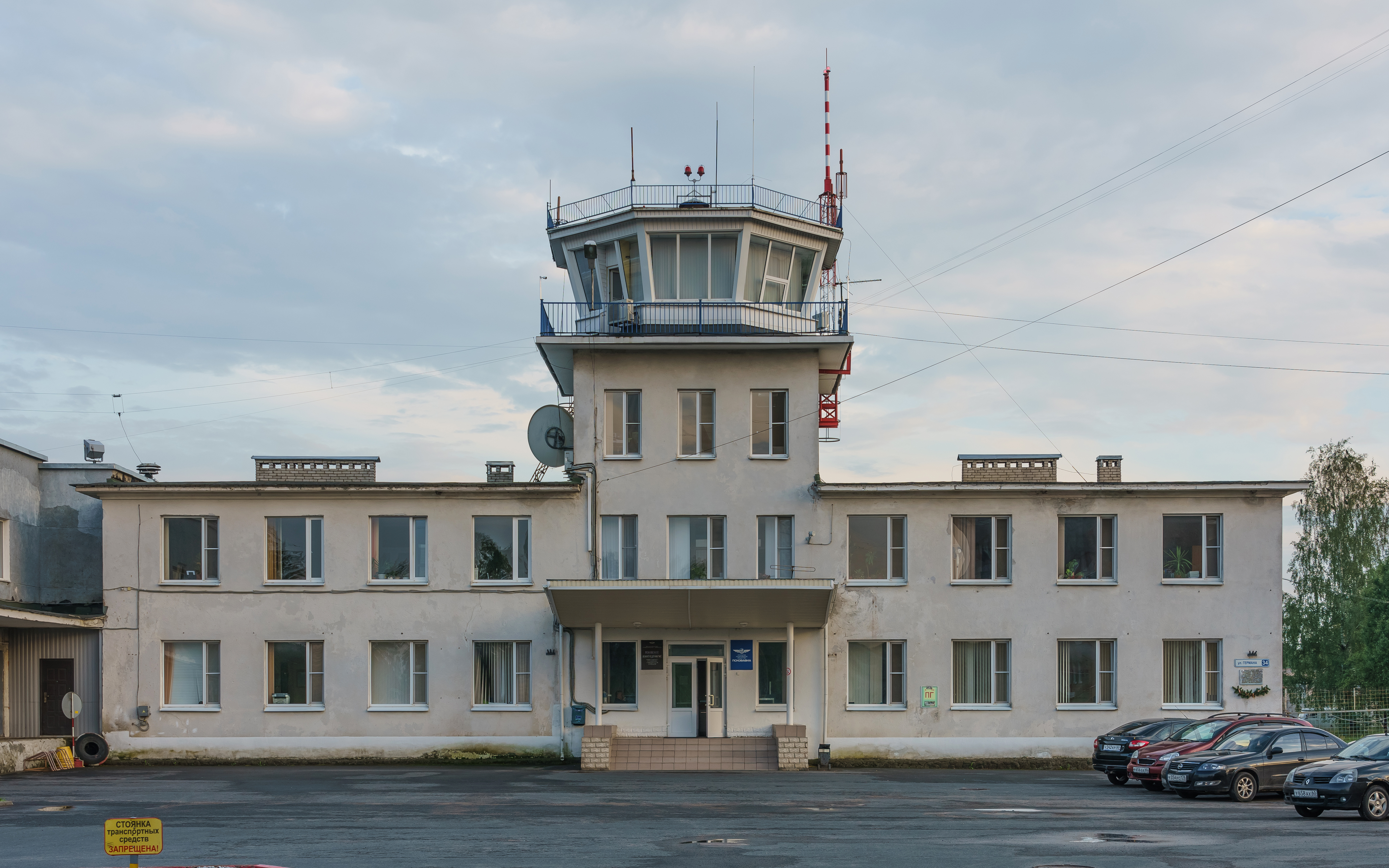
Control tower

The airfield dates to the 1930s, when it became a host base for one of the Soviet Airforce regiments. Under the German Nazi occupation, it was used by the Luftwaffe to supply advancing Wehrmacht troops.

After WWII, some commercial use of the airport was used for commuter services to local airfields in Pskov oblast (Velikiye Luki, Gdov, Samolva, etc.) and for scheduled flights to Moscow, Leningrad, Riga, Tartu, Vitebsk, Kharkiv, Simferopol and other destinations in the European part of the USSR.

By 1955, intelligence sources reported four-engine aircraft operating on a 2500-meter runway. In the 1960s, the airfield hosted about two dozen Antonov An-10 and Antonov An-12 turboprop transports. In the 1970s, the aircraft were upgraded to Il-76 jets, operated by the 334 VTAP (334th Military Transport Aviation Regiment). In 1984, the airbase had a normal complement of 27 Il-76 aircraft.

Some time prior to the 1980s, part of the airbase was set aside for commercial activities, while the runway was shared, and a few regular commercial flights began. During the 1990s, regular commercial flights were interrupted due to the economic collapse which caused a significant reduction in the demand for passenger and cargo air service and the closure of all local airfields in Pskov and Leningrad oblasts. After a short-lived air connection to Moscow operated by Eurasia Airlines during 2003, scheduled airline services were not resumed until May 2007. In the beginning, these services were operated by St. Petersburg-based carrier Vyborg Airlines but have since been taken over by UTair Aviation and Atlant-Soyuz and later discontinued. In 2009, two airlines announced they would serve the airport. Region-Avia started flights to Moscow-Vnukovo and airBaltic announced international services to its Riga hub. The latter services were cancelled in December 2009 due to the state of the runway during winter.

During the 2010s, Pskovavia maintained scheduled flights to Moscow and St. Petersburg with An-24 and An-26 turboprops until the airline's license was revoked. In 2018, Azimuth airline began regular flights to Moscow with its Sukhoi Superjet 100. As of 2020, flights to five Russian airports are maintained.

Scheduled passenger flights are currently operated by Sukhoi Superjet 100, Bombardier CRJ and Let L-410.

On 29 August 2023, a Ukrainian drone attack targeted the airbase, destroying two Il-76 jets and damaging another two.

== Airlines and destinations ==
Airlines	Destinations
Azimuth	Kaliningrad, Mineralnye Vody, Moscow–Vnukovo, Sochi

== See also ==
- List of airports in Russia
- List of military airbases in Russia
