= Yushkino =

Rural locality in Gdovsky District, Pskov Oblast, Russia

Coordinates: 58°38′N 27°52′E

Yushkino (Russian: Ю́шкино) is the third largest village of Yushkinskaya Volost and its administrative center. It belongs to Gdovsky District of Pskov Oblast, Russia and is located 11 kilometers south of Gdov. Vetka River flows through the village and the large Lake Peipus is located in around 5 kilometers from its center. The population in 2002 was 52. The nearest village is Zaborovye, in 1.5 kilometers to the North-East.

The only historical building in Yushkino is a brick house with decorative boulder masonry which dates back to the end of the 19th century. It once belonged to a family of reach peasants and now is home to the local convenience store.

== Transport ==
Yushkino is connected to the cities of Gdov, Pskov and Saint Petersburg by regular buses that pass through the village and stop on request. A one-way ticket from Yushkino to Gdov costs around $1, to Pskov $4 and to Saint Petersburg $6. There also is a daily bus from Gdov to Trutnevo, the largest settlement of Yushkinskaya Volost, that passes through Yushkino.
