= Sharansky =

Sharansky (masculine), Sharanskaya (feminine), or Sharanskoye (neuter) may refer to:

- Natan Sharansky (born 1948), Soviet refusenik during the 1970s and 1980s, Israeli author and politician
- Sharansky District, a district of the Republic of Bashkortostan, Russia

== See also ==
- Sharanski, a rural locality in Palkinsky District, Pskov Oblast, Russia
