= Mogutovo =

Mogutovo may refer to:

- Mogutovo, Naro-Fominsky District, Moscow Oblast, a village in Naro-Fominsky District of Moscow Oblast, Russia
- Mogutovo, Shchyolkovsky District, Moscow Oblast, a village in Shchyolkovsky District of Moscow Oblast, Russia
- Mogutovo, Orenburg Oblast, a village (selo) in Orenburg Oblast, Russia
- Mogutovo, Pskov Oblast, a village in Pskov Oblast, Russia
