= Mikhalki =

Mikhalki may refer to:

- Mikhalki, Belarus, a village in Homiel Province of Belarus, which has been absorbed by the city of Mazyr
- Mikhalki, Russia, a village in Velikoluksky District of Pskov Oblast, Russia
