= Yamm (rural locality) =

Village in northeast Russia

Yamm Ямм
- Village
- Location within Pskov Oblast Location within Russia
- Coordinates: 58.423°N 28.068°E
- Country: Russia
- Region: Pskov Oblast
- District: Gdovsky District
- Rural settlement: Polna Rural Settlement

Population (2020)
  - Total: 577
- Time zone: UTC+3:00

Yamm (Russian: Ямм) is a rural locality (a village) and the administrative center of the Polna Rural Settlement (Russian: Полновская волость) in Gdovsky District of Pskov Oblast, Russia. It is located along the Zhelcha River, about 47 kilometers (29 mi) south of the district center Gdov and 70 kilometers (43 mi) north of the regional center Pskov. As of 2020, the village had a population of 577.

The settlement emerged in the Sorokovoy Bor forest in 1906. It began to grow around the Narva–Pskov railway built between 1915 and 1916, along which a station was established, named Yamm after an older village in the area now called Yamok. A sawmill was established in 1918, later becoming a forestry combine producing wood for the city of Pskov. During World War II, Yamm was under German occupation from 1941 until February 1944. The settlement was rebuilt after the war, while the railroad was not and the station was closed permanently. Later industrial enterprises have included a new sawmill and a fish processing plant.

After the abolition of the Gdovsky Uyezd in 1927, Yamm became part of the Polnovsky District. In 1947, the district's administrative center was moved from the village of Polna to Yamm. The district was consolidated with the Gdovsky District in 1958.

There is an Orthodox church in Yamm dedicated to Saint Seraphim of Sarov, built in 2005.
