= Vetvenik =

Village in Gdovsky District, Pskov Oblast, Russia

Coordinates: 58°40′N 27°46′E

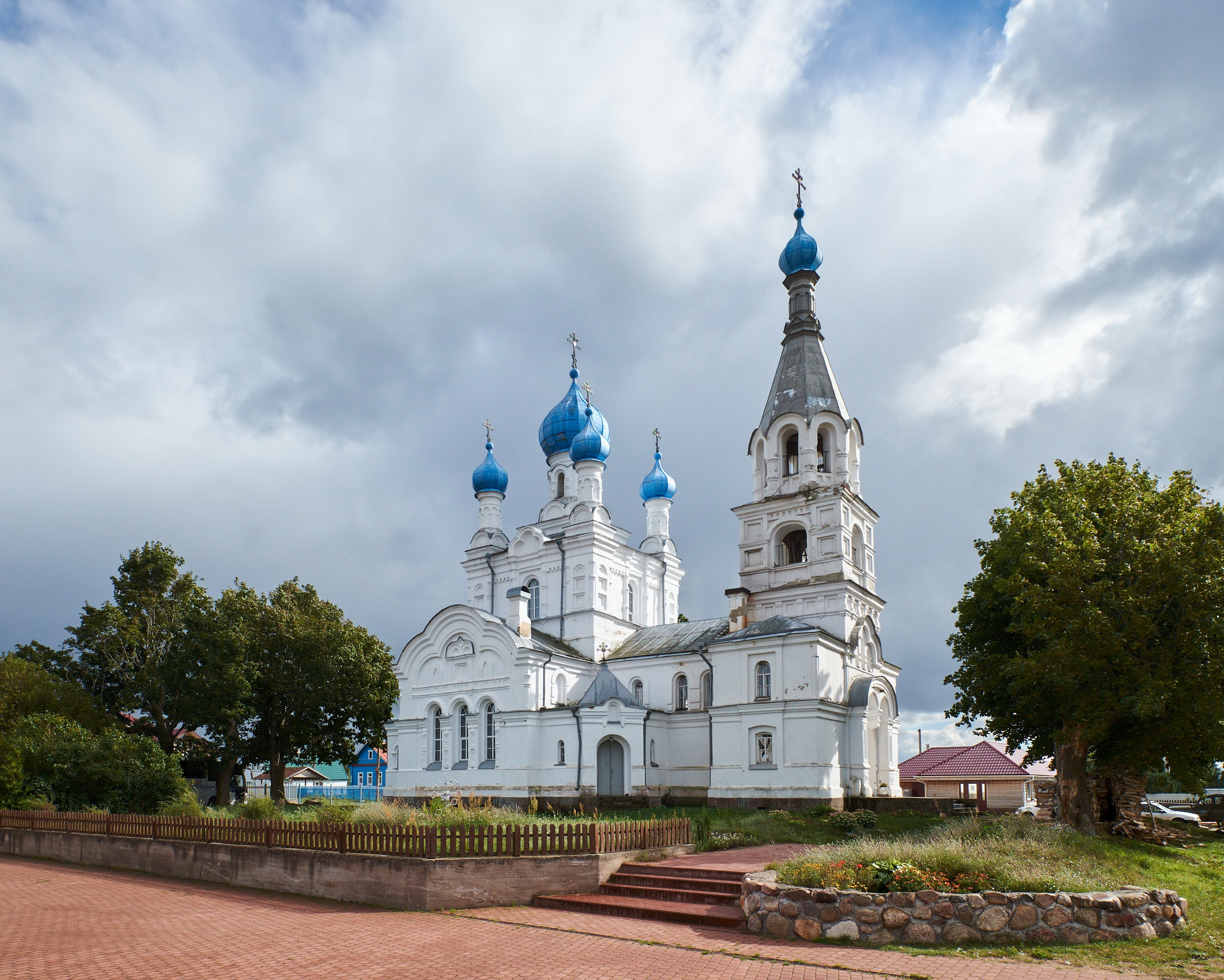
Church of St. Peter and St. Paul

Vetvenik (Russian: Ве́твеник) is the second largest village of Yushkinskaya Volost which is a part of Gdovsky District of Pskov Oblast, Russia, located on the shore of Lake Peipus.

The population in 2002 was 89 people. Vetvenik is home to a primary school and a large church.
