= Region Avia =

Russian regional airline

Region Avia Регион-Авиа
| IATA | ICAO | Call sign |
|---|---|---|
| RK | — | — |
- Founded: 2005
- Commenced operations: 2006
- Ceased operations: 2011
- Operating bases: Domodedovo International Airport; Bykovo Airport
- Fleet size: 16
- Destinations: 12 (in 2009)
- Headquarters: Moscow, Russia
- Key people: Denis Pavshinsky (CEO)
- Website: www.regionavia.ru

Region Avia logo in Russian.

Region Avia (Russian: Регион-Авиа), also styled Region-Avia or Region Avia Airlines, was a regional airline based in Moscow, Russia, operating scheduled passenger flights out of Domodedovo International Airport, and chartered services out of Bykovo Airport.

== History ==
Region Avia was registered in Moscow in 2005, as a company which was to 52% owned by (unnamed) Russian citizens and had an initial funding of $50 million. It received its Air Operator's Certificate on 19 August 2006. The last scheduled flight (from Tambov to Moscow) took place on 31 December 2010, and the company was dissolved in early 2011.

== Destinations ==
At its height in 2009, Region Avia operated scheduled services to the following domestic destinations:

- Arkhangelsk - Talagi Airport
- Anapa - Anapa Airport
- Ivanovo - Ivanovo Yuzhny Airport
- Kursk - Kursk Vostochny Airport
- Moscow - Domodedovo International Airport (base)
- Nizhny Novgorod - Nizhny Novgorod International Airport
- Petrozavodsk - Petrozavodsk Airport
- Pskov - Pskov Airport
- Saint Petersburg - Pulkovo Airport
- Sochi - Sochi International Airport
- Tambov - Tambov Donskoye Airport
- Yaroslavl - Tunoshna Airport

Between 2007 and 2008, Region-Avia had offered flights from Yekaterinburg to Magnitogorsk, Ufa and Nyagan on behalf of Aviaprad.

== Fleet ==
The Region Avia Airlines fleet included the following aircraft:

- 8 Antonov An-28
- 8 Embraer EMB 120 Brasilia

The company had plans to acquire a fleet of up to 50 foreign-made aircraft (either ATR 42, ATR 72 or Bombardier Dash 8) by 2012.
