= Pskovavia =

Russian airline

IATA	ICAO	Call sign
—	PSW	PSKOVAVIA
- Founded: 1944; 82 years ago
- Ceased operations: 2018
- Hubs: Pskov
- Fleet size: 0
- Destinations: 22 (scheduled)
- Headquarters: Pskov
- Website: pskovavia.ru

Pskovavia was a passenger and cargo airline based in Pskov, Russia. It operated international and domestic charter passenger and cargo services as well as regular scheduled flights between Pskov and Moscow. Its main base was Pskov Airport.

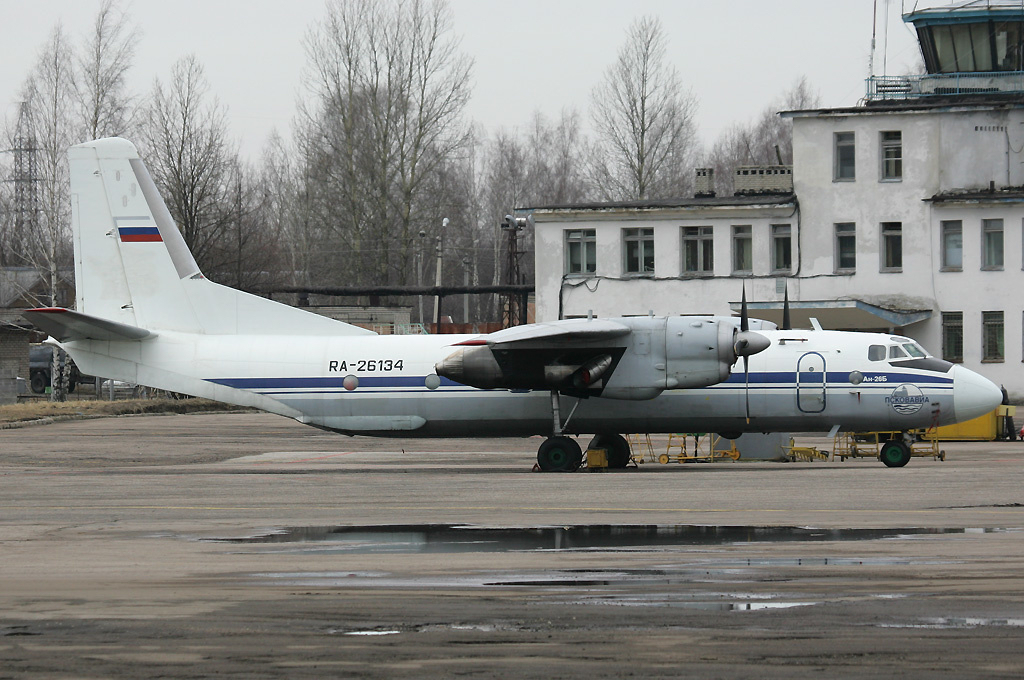
Antonov An-26

== History ==
The airline was established and started operations in 1944. It was formerly Aeroflot Pskov Division.

The Federal Agency for Air Transport (Rosaviatsia) suspended the Pskovavia airline flight certificate on April 4, 2018. Pskovavia was replaced by the airline Azimuth.

== Destinations ==
Pskovavia carried out scheduled flights between Pskov (Pskov Airport) and Moscow (Domodedovo Airport) on Mondays, Wednesdays, and Fridays. On 20 June 2013 Pskovavia announced St Petersburg (Pulkovo Airport) flights would resume, starting in August 2013.

As of July 2013 Pskovavia served the following destinations:

=== Russia ===
Bryansk Oblast

- Bryansk – Bryansk Airport

(Republic of Karelia) Karelia

- Petrozavodsk – Besovets Airport

Kursk Oblast

- Kursk – Kursk Vostochny Airport

Moscow / Moscow Oblast

- Moscow – Moscow Domodedovo Airport

Murmansk Oblast

- Apatity / Kirovsk – Khibiny Airport

Pskov Oblast

- Pskov – Pskov Airport base

Saint Petersburg / Leningrad Oblast

- Saint Petersburg – Pulkovo Airport

Tambov Oblast

- Tambov - Tambov Donskoye Airport

Vladimir Oblast

- Vladimir - Semyazino Airport

Vologda Oblast

- Vologda – Vologda Airport

Pskovavia's AN-26 also frequently visits Helsinki-Vantaa airport during early evenings.

== Fleet ==
As of July 2019 the Pskovavia fleet included:

- 2 Antonov An-26 – Stored
- 5 Antonov An-24 – Stored

== Performance Summary ==
In 2013, the airline transported 55,000 passengers, including 6,200 passengers on the Pskov–Moscow route.

In 2014, the airline transported over 65,000 passengers.

Throughout 2017 and into early 2018, the airline was experiencing a severe financial crisis.
