= Simansky Log =

Village in Strugo-Krasnensky District, Pskov Oblast, Russia

Coordinates: 58°20′05″N 28°36′50″E

Simansky Log (Russian: Сима́нский Лог) is a village in Strugo-Krasnensky District of Pskov Oblast, Russia.
