= Glush =

Village in Pskov Oblast, Russia

Coordinates: 58°20′N 28°8′E

Glush (Russian: Глушь) is a village in Gdovsky District of Pskov Oblast, Russia. Postal code: 181684.
