= Yushkinskaya Volost =

Yushkinskaya Volost Юшкинская волость
- Rural settlement
- Yushkinskaya Volost within Pskov Oblast
- Coordinates: 58°38′42″N 27°52′26″E
- Country: Russia
- Province (Oblast): Pskov
- Municipal District: Gdov
- Administrative center: Yushkino

Area
  - Total: 268.32 km^{2} (103.60 sq mi)

Population (2016)
  - Total: 778
  - Density: 2.90/km^{2} (7.51/sq mi)
- Time zone: Moscow Time (UTC+03:00)

Yushkinskaya Volost is a rural settlement in Gdov Municipal District of Pskov Oblast in northern Russia inhabited by Russians, Estonians, Belarusians, and Romas. The volost covers 268.32 square kilometres (103.60 sq mi) and includes 32 villages, one of which is uninhabited. The administrative center is the village of Yushkino, which is, however, only the third largest by population after Trutnevo and Vetvenik.

Although remote and hardly accessible, this area attracts some tourists and dachniks (owners of seasonal second homes, usually log cabins or small cottages) due to its untouched nature, ecology, traditional way of life and some objects of cultural and historical heritage of local significance. Many of its villages are not connected to Gdov by regular public transport. The quality of rural roads is very poor and in winter and rainy seasons it is hard to reach some remote settlements by an ordinary car.

Only five of the 32 villages have permanent convenience stores, other are served by so-called avtolavkas (Russian: автола́вка), trucks with essential goods which arrive from Gdov once in a week or two and stay for around thirty minutes in each settlement.

There are two schools in Yushkinskaya Volost, one in Vetvenik and one in Trutnevo. Vetvenik school only offers primary education which covers grades from 1 to 4, while Trutnevo school has all grades of secondary education up to 11. The only post office in the area is located in Trutnevo.

== Constituent communities ==
Number	Locality	Type of locality	Population (2002)
1	Trutnevo	Village	281
2	Vetvenik	Village	89
3	Yushkino	Village, administrative center	52
4	Zigoska I	Village	51
5	Beshkino I	Village	50
6	Storozhinets	Village	29
7	Neznamo Pole	Village	28
8	Lunyovshchina	Village	26
9	Zigoska II	Village	24
10	Kozlovo	Village	21
11	Stropitsy	Village	19
12	Dukhnova Gora	Village	18
13	Beshkino II	Village	15
14	Gorka	Village	15
15	Lodygin Dvor	Village	13
16	Rechitsy Malye	Village	13
17	Sidorovshchina	Village	13
18	Kunest	Village	10
19	Zagorye	Village	9
20	Ruchyi	Village	9
21	Shelopugino	Village	9
22	Andronova Gora	Village	8
23	Zaborovye	Village	7
24	Sorokina Gora	Village	6
25	Strektovo	Village	6
26	Zabrednyazhye	Village	4
27	Burtsovshchina	Village	2
28	Zapolye	Village	2
29	Kurino	Village	2
30	Merzlyakovo	Village	2
31	Zamoshye	Village	1
32	Zamikushye	Village	0
