= Dragotina, Russia =

Rural locality in Gdovsky District, Pskov Oblast, Russia

Coordinates: 58°26′N 27°46′E

Dragotina (Russian: Драготина) is a village in Gdovsky District of Pskov Oblast, Russia.
