= Remdovsky Zakaznik =

Nature reserve in Russia

- IUCN category III (natural monument or feature)
- Location within Russia
- Location: Russia
- Nearest city: Pskov
- Coordinates: 58°15′N 27°40′E
- Area: 649 km^{2} (251 sq mi)
- Established: 1985

Remdovsky Zakaznik (Russian: Ремдовский заказник) is a federal zakaznik, a nature protected area, in the northwest of Russia, located in Gdovsky and Pskovsky Districts of Pskov Oblast, north of the city of Pskov. It was established in 1985 to protect flora and fauna (in particular, rare species) of the lowlands adjacent to Lake Peipus.

The name of the zakaznik originates from the Remda River, a left tributary of the Zhelcha River, which flows in the zakaznik.

== Geography ==
Remdovsky Zakaznik is located on the eastern bank of Lake Peipus, in the area separating two its biggest parts, Lake Chudskoye (Lake Peipus) in the north and Lake Pskovskoye (Lake Pihkva) in the south. The biggest river in the zakaznik is the Zhelcha, the lower course of which enters the zakaznik from the north. The area is flat and swampy. There are over twenty-five lakes in the zakaznik.

== Flora ==
78% of the forest are pine forests, 2% is occupied by spruce, and 22% are birch, aspen, and alder.

== Fauna ==
The big mammals within the zakaznik include moose, wild boar, roe deer, brown bear, fox, and raccoon dog.
