= Mayakovo =

Mayakovo Маяково
- village
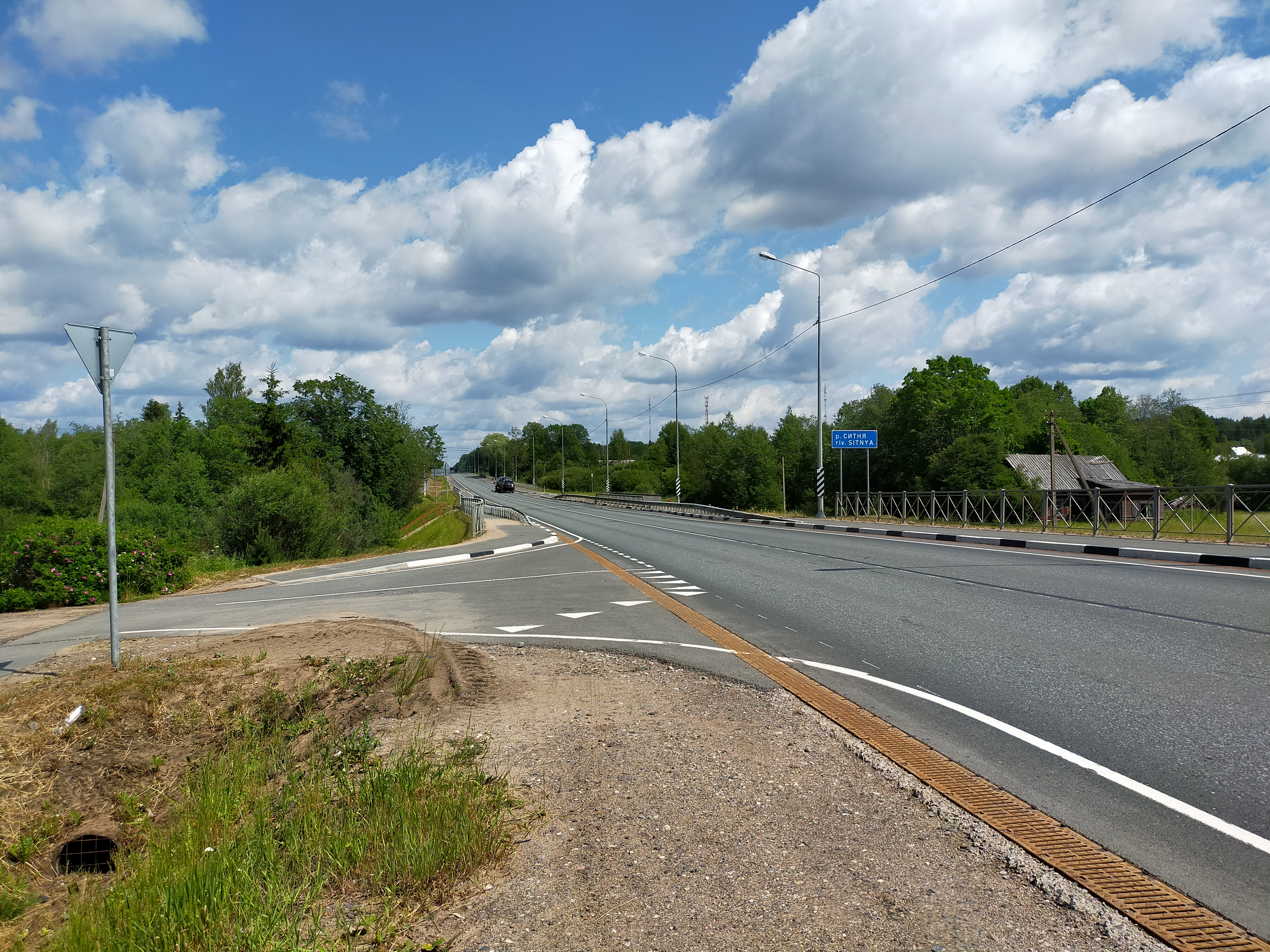
- Interactive map of Mayakovo
- Coordinates: 58°07′50″N 29°09′40″E

Mayakovo (Russian: Маяково) is a village in Strugo-Krasnensky District of Pskov Oblast, Russia, located on the bank of Sitnya River, northeast of the town Pskov. Population: 72 (2010 census);
