= Strektovo =

Village in Gdovsky District, Pskov Oblast, Russia

Coordinates: 58°41′N 27°49′E

Strektovo (Russian: Стректово) is a village in Gdovsky District of Pskov Oblast, Russia.
