= Zhelcha =

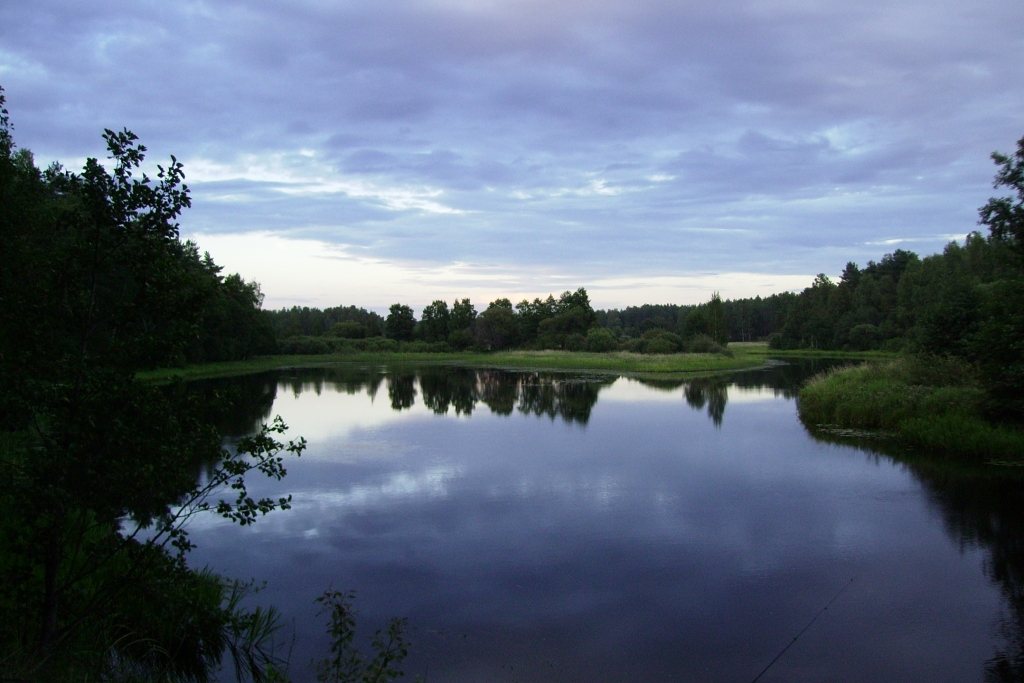

Location
- Country: Russia

Physical characteristics
- Mouth
  - location: Lake Peipus
  - coordinates: 58°18′40″N 27°40′44″E
  - elevation: 30 m (98 ft)
- Length: 107 km (66 mi)
- Basin size: 1,220 km^{2} (470 sq mi)

Basin features
- Progression: Lake Peipus→ Narva→ Gulf of Finland

The Zhelcha (Russian: Желча) is a river in Strugo-Krasnensky and Gdovsky Districts in Pskov Oblast, Russia, a tributary of Lake Peipus. It is 107 kilometres (66 mi) long, and the area of its drainage basin is 1,220 square kilometres (470 mi^{2}). It is navigable downstream from the settlement of Yamm. The main tributaries of the Zhelcha are the rivers Dubenka, the Krapivenka, the Nizhnyaya Belka, and the Yeglina.

The source of the Zhelcha is located in the western part of Strugo-Krasnensky District, to the north of the village of Tvorozhkovo. The Zhelcha flows in the northwestern direction, and in the village of Yukhnovo turns west. It enters Gdovsky District, flows through the selos of Polna and Yamm, and turns southwest. The mouth of the Zhelcha is north of the village of Kobylye Gorodishche. In the lower course, the Zhelcha flows through a number of lakes, including Lake Uzhinskoye, Lake Dolgoye, and Lake Velino.

The lower course of the Zhelcha is located in Remdovsky Zakaznik, one of the three nature protected areas on the federal level in Pskov Oblast.
