= Blyansk =

Rural locality in Gdovsky District, Pskov Oblast, Russia

Coordinates: 58°29′N 28°22′E

Blyansk (Russian: Блянск) is a village in Gdovsky District of Pskov Oblast, Russia.
