= Potrekhnovo =

Village in Gdovsky District, Pskov Oblast, Russia

Coordinates: 58.960283°N 27.990558°E

Potrekhnovo (Russian: Потрехново) is a village in Gdovsky District of Pskov Oblast, Russia.
