= Uldiga =

Village in Gdovsky District, Pskov Oblast, Russia

Coordinates: 58°49′48″N 28°09′53″E

Uldiga (Russian: Ульдига) is a village in Gdovsky District of Pskov Oblast, Russia.
