= Uzmino =

Village in Strugo-Krasnensky District, Pskov Oblast, Russia

Coordinates: 58°26′N 28°46′E

Uzmino (Russian: Узьмино) is a village in Strugo-Krasnensky District of Pskov Oblast, Russia
