= Samolva =

Samolva Самолва
- Village

- Location within Pskov Oblast Location within Russia
- Coordinates: 58°17′26″N 27°37′27″E
- Country: Russia
- Region: Pskov Oblast
- District: Gdovsky District

Population (2021)
  - Total: 129
- Time zone: UTC+3:00

Samolva (Russian: Самолва) is a village in Gdovsky District, Pskov Oblast, Russia, located on the shore of Lake Peipus. At the time of the 2021 census, it had a population of 129.

== Geography ==
Samolva is located on the shore of Lake Peipus near the border with Estonia. Near the village, a river with the same name flows into the Zhelcha Bay of the lake.

Samolva was the municipal center of a rural settlement within the Gdovsky District until 2025, when the municipal district was reorganized into a municipal okrug (i.e. not divided into municipalities). Aside from Samolva itself, the municipality included 30 other localities: Chudskaya Rudnitsa, Chudskiye Zakhody, Gashkovo, Golodusha, Gologlyag, Gorka, Grebenyovo, Kazakovets, Kobylye Gorodishche, Kola, Korovye Selo, Kozlovo, Lug, Nizovitsy, Novoselye, Orekhovtsy, Ostrov, Ozera, Piskopovo, Pnyovo, Putkovo, Remda, Tabory, Velikusha, Veterya 1, Veterya 3, Vyazovitsy, Zabolotye, Zakhody and Zamoshye.

== History ==
Samolva is located about three kilometers (1.9 mi) from the site of the Battle on the Ice of 1242. The village itself has existed at least since the 16th century, when it was mentioned as Samolovskoye selo and Samolov.

During the Great Northern War of the early 18th century, Estonians began settling in the area around Samolva. According to Peter von Köppen, there were six villages (not including Samolva itself) within the obshchina of Samolva that were populated by a total of 493 Lutheran Estonians. The Estonian name for Samolva is Samblaküla or Samblõkülä.

In 1862, Samolva had a population of 35. The village was the center of a volost within the Gdovsky uezd and had its own Orthodox chapel as well as a parochial school. The Orthodox residents of Samolva belonged to the parish of Kobylye Gorodishche.

In the early Soviet period, Samolva was part of the volost of Remda, becoming the center of a selsoviet within it in 1924. After uezds and volosts were abolished in 1927, the Samolva selsoviet became part of the Seryodkinsky District. The selsoviet comprised 12 villages with a total population of 1,841 in 1933. In 1943, while the area was under German occupation, some 250 Estonians from the area around Samolva were relocated to Võõpsu.

After the Seryodkinsky District was abolished in 1958, Samolva was transferred to the Gdovsky District.

A museum showcasing documents, maps and equipment used in locating the site of the Battle on the Ice was opened at the village library in 2012. A monument to Alexander Nevsky, measuring 15 meters (49 ft) in height, was completed in 2021. The village was removed from the border security zone in 2023.
