= Davydkovo, Vologodsky District, Vologda Oblast =

Davydkovo Давыдково
- Village
- Location within Vologda Oblast Location within Russia
- Coordinates: 59°27′N 39°04′E
- Country: Russia
- Region: Vologda Oblast
- District: Vologodsky District
- Time zone: UTC+3:00

Davydkovo (Russian: Давыдково) is a rural locality (a village) in Kubenskoye Rural Settlement, Vologodsky District, Vologda Oblast, Russia. The population was 10 as of 2002.

== Geography ==
Davydkovo is located 69 km northwest of Vologda (the district's administrative centre) by road. Sinitsyno is the nearest rural locality.
