= Kotoshi =

Rural locality in Plyussky District, Pskov Oblast, Russia

Coordinates: 58°33′N 28°33′E

Kotoshi (Russian: Котоши) is a village in Plyussky District of Pskov Oblast, Russia.
