= Mogutovo, Pskov Oblast =

Village in Strugo-Krasnensky District, Pskov Oblast, Russia

Coordinates: 58°10′54″N 28°48′57″E

Mogutovo (Russian: Могутово) is a village in Strugo-Krasnensky District of Pskov Oblast, Russia.
