= Davydkovo, Sheksninsky District, Vologda Oblast =

Davydkovo Давыдково
- Village
- Location within Vologda Oblast Location within Russia
- Coordinates: 59°25′N 38°48′E
- Country: Russia
- Region: Vologda Oblast
- District: Sheksninsky District
- Time zone: UTC+3:00

Davydkovo (Russian: Давыдково) is a rural locality (a village) in Sizemskoye Rural Settlement, Sheksninsky District, Vologda Oblast, Russia. The population was four as of 2002.

== Geography ==
Davydkovo is located 70 km northeast of Sheksna (the district's administrative centre) by road. Artemyevo is the nearest rural locality.
