= Lake Peipus dialect =

Dialect of Russian spoken in Pskov Oblast

Lake Peipus
- prichudskiy govor
- Native to: Russia, Estonia
- Region: Pskov Oblast, Tartu County
- Language family: Indo-European: Balto-Slavic; Slavic; East Slavic; Russian; Central Russian; Pskov dialects; Lake Peipus

Language codes
- ISO 639-3: –

Lake Peipus dialect (Russian: Причудский говор) is a Russian language variety spoken on both sides of the Lake Peipus in Pskov Oblast, Russia and some counties of Estonia. It originated as a mix of Pskov and Gdov dialects of the Central Russian cluster. As many other dialects from this area, it is often considered to be transitional between Russian and Belarusian. Lake Peipus dialects also include some loanwords from the Estonian language.

The dialect has been studied and described by Olga Rovnova of the University of Tartu who has conducted fieldwork in Russian Old Believers' communities in Estonia.

== Examples ==
	Lake Peipus	Russian	Belarusian	Estonian
to row	griabcy	gresti	hrebci	sõudma
other	inšy	drugoj	inšy	teine
permit	luba	razriešenije	dazvol	luba
for	gli	dlia	dlia	jaoks
he	jon	on	jon	ta
Tuesday	avtorak	vtornik	aŭtorak	teisipäev
tea	caj	čaj	čaj	tee
sausage	vorstik	kolbasa	kaŭbasa	vorst

Lake Peipus dialect: Nie peckaj adiožynu, hto myt' i chystit' budie?

Standard Russian: Nie pačkaj odieždu, kto myt' i chistit' budiet?

Belarusian: Nia peckaj adziežu, chto myć i čyścić budzie?

English: Do not stain your clothes, who will wash and clean it?
