= Apalyovo, Pskov Oblast =

Rural locality in Gdovsky District, Pskov Oblast, Russia

Coordinates: 58.540°N 28.296°E

Apalevo (Russian: Апалёво) is a rural locality (a village) in Gdovsky District of Pskov Oblast, Russia.
