= Maryinsko =

Village in Pskov Oblast, Russia

Coordinates: 58°49′08″N 28°32′50″E

Maryinsko (Russian: Марьинско) is a village in Plyussky District of Pskov Oblast, Russia.
