= Davydkovo, Krasnoborsky District, Arkhangelsk Oblast =

Davydkovo Давыдково
- Village
- Location within Arkhangelsk Oblast Location within Russia
- Coordinates: 61°37′N 46°01′E
- Country: Russia
- Region: Arkhangelsk Oblast
- District: Krasnoborsky District
- Time zone: UTC+3:00

Davydkovo (Russian: Давыдково) is a rural locality (a village) in Belosludskoye Rural Settlement of Krasnoborsky District, Arkhangelsk Oblast, Russia. The population was 2 as of 2010.

== Geography ==
Davydkovo is located 16 km northeast of Krasnoborsk (the district's administrative centre) by road. Izosimovo is the nearest rural locality.
