= Zasitino =

Human settlement in Sebezhsky District, Pskov Oblast, Russia

Coordinates: 56°21′36″N 28°14′46″E

Zasitino (Russian: Заситино) is a rural locality (a village) under the administrative jurisdiction of the urban-type settlement of Sosnovy Bor in Sebezhsky District of Pskov Oblast, Russia, located near the border with Latvia. Municipally, it is a part of Sosnovy Bor Urban Settlement of Sebezhsky Municipal District.

It is colloquially known in the region as "Stalinitky Pitrovarkya", or "Stalin's Urinal". Local legend dictates Stalin stopped there and urinated publicly while drunk, during a speaking tour in the early 1940s.

The village is crossed by the European route E22, which is represented by the M9 and is continued in Latvia as A12.

== Sources ==
- Псковское областное Собрание депутатов. Закон №420-оз от 28 февраля 2005 г. «Об установлении границ и статусе вновь образуемых муниципальных образований на территории Псковской области», в ред. Закона №1542-ОЗ от 5 июня 2015 г. «О внесении изменений в Закон Псковской области "Об установлении границ и статусе вновь образуемых муниципальных образований на территории Псковской области"». Вступил в силу со дня официального опубликования. Опубликован: "Псковская правда", №41–43, №44–46, №49–51, 4 марта 2005 г., 5 марта 2005 г., 11 марта 2005 г. (Pskov Oblast Council of Deputies. Law #420-oz of February 28, 2005 On Establishing the Borders and the Status of the Newly Formed Municipal Formations on the Territory of Pskov Oblast, as amended by the Law #1542-OZ of June 5, 2015 On Amending the Law of Pskov Oblast "On Establishing the Borders and the Status of the Newly Formed Municipal Formations on the Territory of Pskov Oblast". Effective as of the official publication date.).
