= Grebly =

Rural locality in Velikoluksky District, Pskov Oblast, Russia

Coordinates: 56°23′N 30°44′E

Grebly (Russian: Греблы) is a village in Velikoluksky District of Pskov Oblast, Russia. Postal code: 182170.

== Geography and settlement ==
Grebly is a rural locality in Russia. Villages of this type are typically small settlements located within larger administrative districts (raions) and form part of the country’s extensive rural settlement system. Rural localities in Russia are commonly characterized by low population density, limited infrastructure, and economies based primarily on agriculture, forestry, or local services.

Many rural settlements in Russia are situated in regions with vast natural landscapes, including forests, plains, and agricultural land. These environmental conditions strongly influence local livelihoods, with residents often engaged in farming, livestock breeding, or seasonal work connected to nearby towns.

== Economy and way of life ==
Like many small Russian villages, Grebly is likely to have an economy centered on subsistence or small-scale agriculture. In rural Russia, common activities include grain cultivation, dairy farming, and household gardening, which contribute both to local consumption and regional supply chains.

Due to urban migration trends, many rural settlements in Russia have experienced population decline over recent decades, as younger residents move to cities for education and employment opportunities. This demographic shift has been widely documented in academic studies on post-Soviet rural development.

== Culture and regional characteristics ==
Culturally, Russian villages often preserve traditional ways of life, including wooden architecture, local crafts, and community-based living patterns. In some regions, Orthodox Christian traditions also play a role in shaping local cultural and seasonal practices.

Rural settlements such as Grebly are part of the broader cultural landscape of Russia, reflecting historical patterns of land use and settlement that date back centuries. Many villages maintain close ties with nearby district centers, where residents access education, healthcare, and administrative services.

== Infrastructure ==
Infrastructure in small rural localities is typically limited but includes basic road connections to nearby towns, local housing, and small community facilities. Access to services such as healthcare and education is usually concentrated in larger administrative centers within the district.
