= Trosno =

Village in Plyussky District, Pskov Oblast, Russia

Coordinates: 58°32′N 28°39′E

Trosno (Russian: Тросно) is a village in Plyussky District of Pskov Oblast, Russia.
