= Avdyatovo =

Avdyatovo Авдятово
- Village
- Location within Pskov Oblast Location within Russia
- Coordinates: 57°31′N 28°21′E
- Country: Russia
- Region: Pskov Oblast
- District: Ostrovsky District
- Time zone: UTC+3:00

Avdyatovo (Russian: Авдятово) is a rural locality (a village) in Ostrovsky District, Pskov Oblast, Russia. The population was 3 as of 2010.

== Geography ==
Avdyatovo is located 22 km north of Ostrov (the district's administrative centre) by road. Asanovshchina is the nearest rural locality.
