= Lunevshchina, Gdovsky District, Pskov Oblast =

Village in Pskov oblast, Russia

Coordinates: 58°36′N 27°53′E

Lunevshchina (Russian: Луневщина) is a village in Gdovsky District of Pskov Oblast, Russia.
