= Davydkovo, Totemsky District, Vologda Oblast =

Davydkovo Давыдково
- Village
- Location within Vologda Oblast Location within Russia
- Coordinates: 59°57′N 42°18′E
- Country: Russia
- Region: Vologda Oblast
- District: Totemsky District
- Time zone: UTC+3:00

Davydkovo (Russian: Давыдково) is a rural locality (a village) in Vozhbalskoye Rural Settlement, Totemsky District, Vologda Oblast, Russia. The population was 4 as of 2002.

== Geography ==
Davydkovo is located 39 km west of Totma (the district's administrative centre) by road. Ivanovskaya is the nearest rural locality.
