= Davydkovo, Syamzhensky District, Vologda Oblast =

Davydkovo Давыдково
- Village
- Location within Vologda Oblast Location within Russia
- Coordinates: 59°56′N 41°07′E
- Country: Russia
- Region: Vologda Oblast
- District: Syamzhensky District
- Time zone: UTC+3:00

Davydkovo (Russian: Давыдково) is a rural locality (a village) in Zhityovskoye Rural Settlement, Syamzhensky District, Vologda Oblast, Russia. The population was 5 as of 2002.

== Geography ==
Davydkovo is located 15 km southeast of Syamzha (the district's administrative centre) by road. Yakovlevskaya is the nearest rural locality.
