= Abryushino =

Abryushino Абрюшино
- Village
- Location within Pskov Oblast Location within Russia
- Coordinates: 57°42′N 28°41′E
- Country: Russia
- Region: Pskov Oblast
- District: Pskovsky District
- Time zone: UTC+3:00

Abryushino (Russian: Абрюшино) is a rural locality (a village) in Pskovsky District, Pskov Oblast, Russia. The population was 2 as of 2010.

== Geography ==
Abryushino is located 34 km southeast of Pskov (the district's administrative centre) by road. Zaborovye is the nearest rural locality.
