= Serbino =

Village in Pskov Oblast, Russia

Coordinates: 58°37′42″N 28°35′40″E

Serbino (Russian: Сербино) is a rural locality (a village) in Plyussky District of Pskov Oblast, Russia.
