= Skobars =

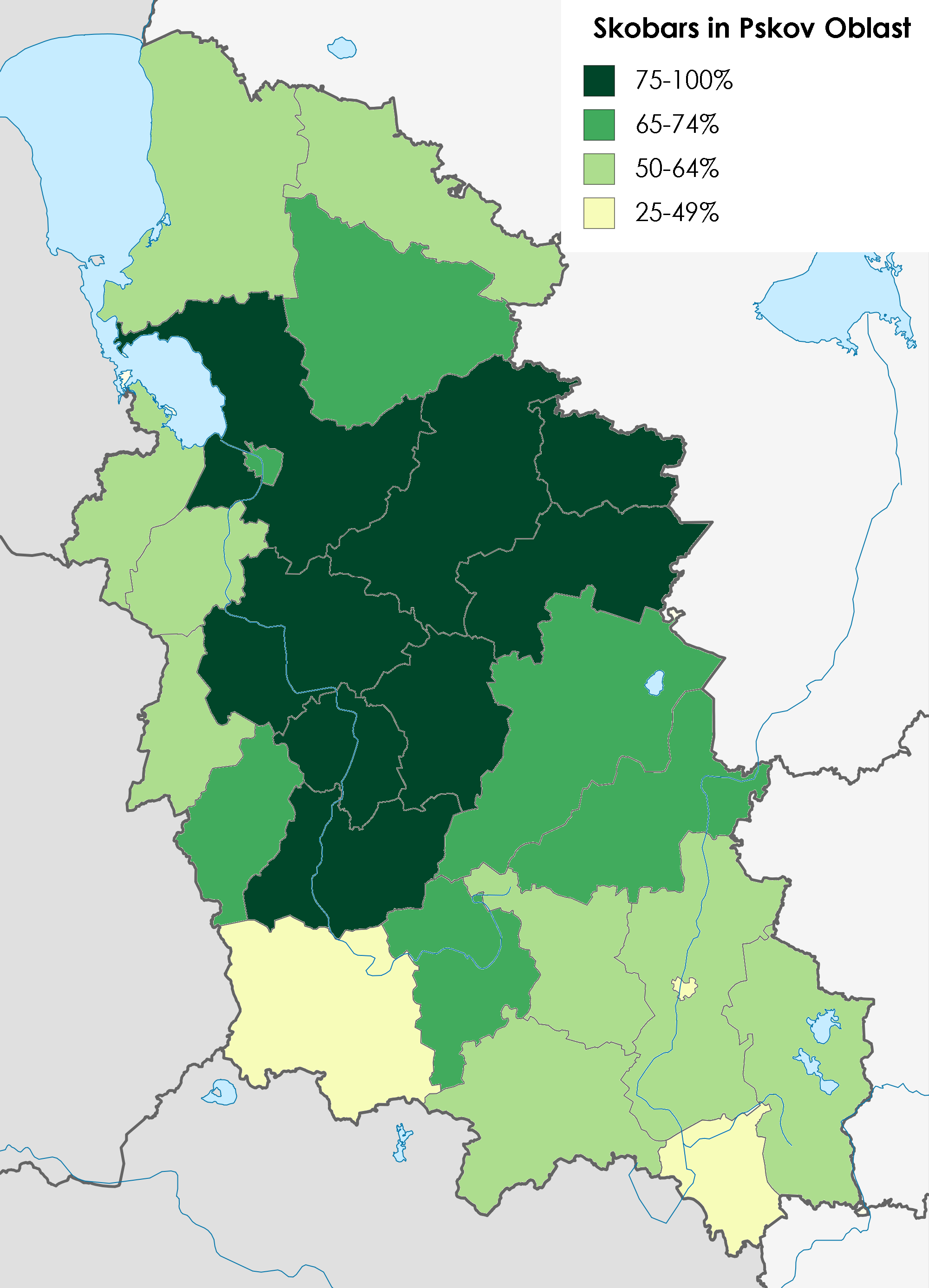
Percentage of Skobars in Pskov Oblast by district (2003)

‘Skobars’ or ‘Skobari’ (Russian: Скобари) is a colloquial name for the inhabitants of the Pskov Oblast and some neighboring areas in the Tver and Novgorod Oblasts. The word comes from the Russian word for horseshoe or bracket (Russian: скоба), which is forged by a blacksmith.

In Pskov Oblast, the identity of locals is exceptionally strong. There is a racing team, a chain of souvenir shops, and a literary magazine named after this group and a blacksmith festival, the Skobar Day. Additionally, there is a monument of a Skobar man in one of the central parks in the city of Pskov.

== References in media ==
The Skobari people are heavily referenced in the song "Sumetskaya" by folk-rock band Otava Yo.
