= Krivandino, Velikoluksky District, Pskov Oblast =

Rural locality in Velikoluksky District, Pskov Oblast, Russia

Coordinates: 56°24′43″N 30°46′04″E

Krivandino (Russian: Кривандино) is a village in Velikoluksky District of Pskov Oblast, Russia.
