= Mikhalki, Russia =

Village in Velikoluksky District, Pskov Oblast, Russia

Coordinates: 56°17′15″N 30°40′15″E

Mikhalki (Russian: Михальки) is a village in Velikoluksky District of Pskov Oblast, Russia.
