= Davydkovo, Pskov Oblast =

Village in Russia

Coordinates: 56°52′20″N 29°07′53″E

Davydkovo (Russian: Давыдково) is a village in Novorzhevsky District of Pskov Oblast, Russia.
