= Sharanski =

Rural locality in Palkinsky District, Pskov Oblast, Russia

Coordinates: 57°32′N 28°14′E

Sharanski (Russian: Шарански) is a rural locality (a village) in Palkinsky District of Pskov Oblast, Russia. As of 2002, the village did not have any recorded population.
