= Trutnevo =

Trutnevo Трутнево
- Village
- Location within Vladimir Oblast Location within Russia
- Coordinates: 56°16′N 38°57′E
- Country: Russia
- Region: Vladimir Oblast
- District: Kirzhachsky District
- Time zone: UTC+3:00

Trutnevo (Russian: Трутнево) is a rural locality (a village) in Kiprevskoye Rural Settlement, Kirzhachsky District, Vladimir Oblast, Russia. The population was 3 as of 2010. There is 1 street.

== Geography ==
Trutnevo is located on the Bolshoy Kirzhach River, 18 km northeast of Kirzhach (the district's administrative centre) by road. Smolnevo is the nearest rural locality.
