= Gdovsky Uyezd =

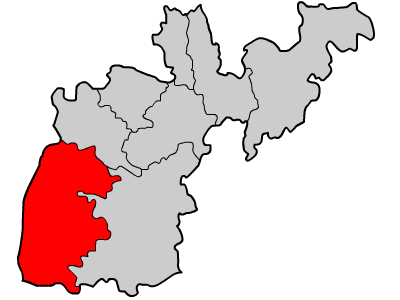
Gdovsky Uyezd in St. Petersburg

Gdovsky Uyezd (Гдовский уезд) was one of the subdivisions of the Saint Petersburg Governorate of the Russian Empire. It was situated in the southwestern part of the governorate. Its administrative centre was Gdov.

== Demographics ==
At the time of the Russian Empire Census of 1897, Gdovsky Uyezd had a population of 145,573. Of these, 88.6% spoke Russian, 10.5% Estonian, 0.2% German, 0.2% Finnish, 0.1% Latvian, 0.1% Polish and 0.1% Yiddish as their native language.
