= Strugo-Krasnensky District =

Strugo-Krasnensky District Струго-Красненский район (Russian)
- District
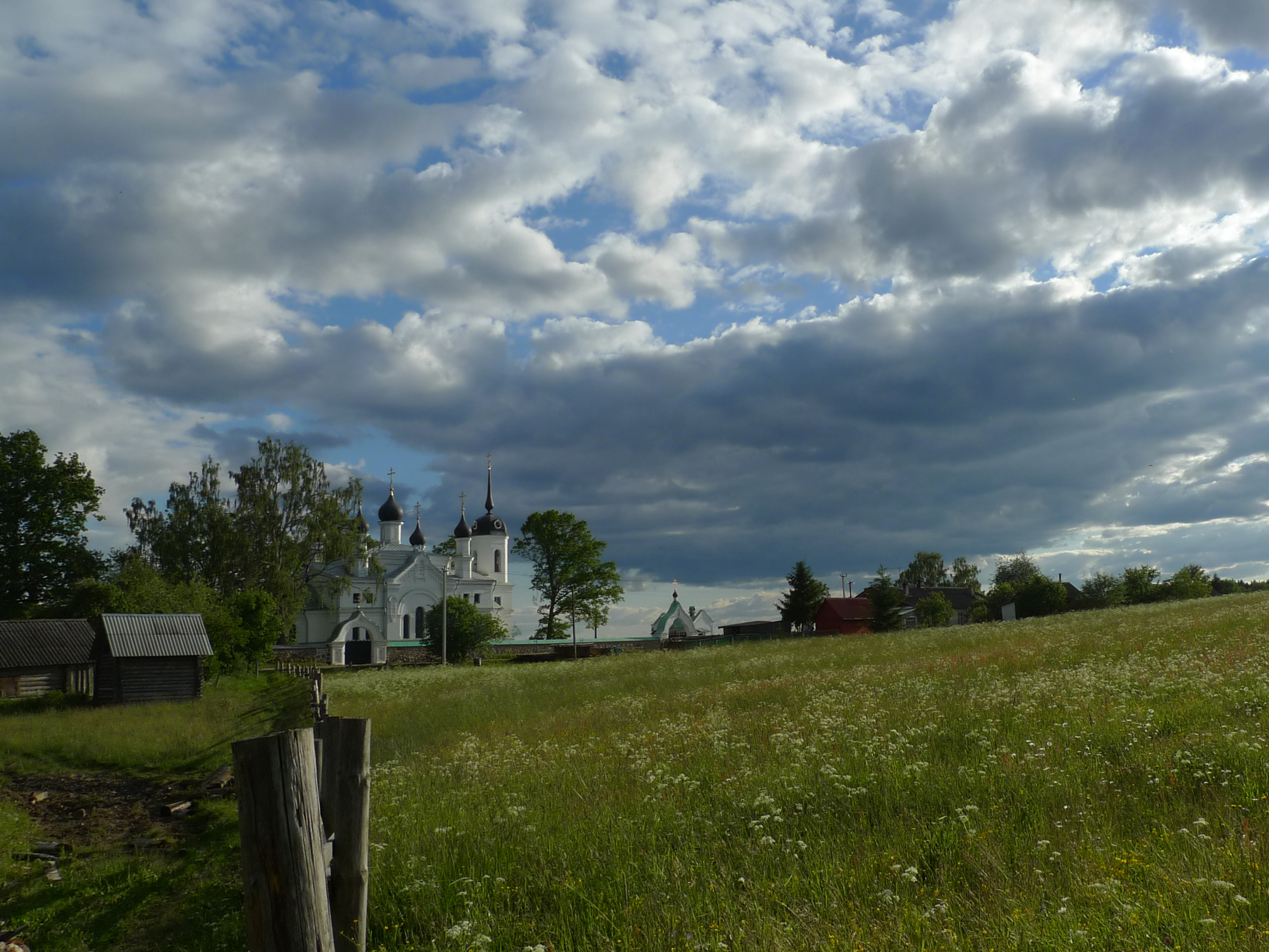
- Tvorozhkovsky Holy Trinity Monastery, Strugo-Kransnensky District

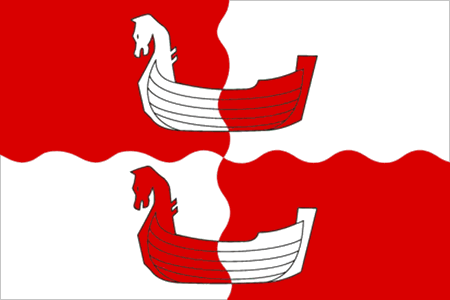
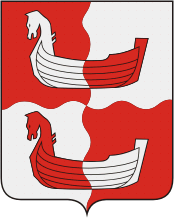
- Flag Coat of arms
- Location of Strugo-Krasnensky District in Pskov Oblast
- Coordinates: 58°16′N 29°06′E
- Country: Russia
- Federal subject: Pskov Oblast
- Established: 1927
- Administrative center: Strugi Krasnye

Area
  - Total: 3,090.1 km^{2} (1,193.1 sq mi)

Population (2010 Census)
  - Total: 13,466
  - Density: 4.3578/km^{2} (11.287/sq mi)
  - Urban: 62.7%
  - Rural: 37.3%

Administrative structure
  - Inhabited localities: 1 urban-type settlements, 174 rural localities

Municipal structure
  - Municipally incorporated as: Strugo-Krasnensky Municipal District
  - Municipal divisions: 1 urban settlements, 5 rural settlements
- Time zone: UTC+3 (MSK)
- OKTMO ID: 58656000
- Website: http://strugikrasnye.reg60.ru

Strugo-Krasnensky District (Russian: Струго-Красненский район) is an administrative and municipal district (raion), one of the twenty-four in Pskov Oblast, Russia. It is located in the northeast of the oblast and borders with Plyussky District in the north, Shimsky and Soletsky Districts of Novgorod Oblast in the east, Porkhovsky District in the south, Pskovsky District in the west, and with Gdovsky District in the northwest. The area of the district is 3,090.1 square kilometers (1,193.1 sq mi). Its administrative center is the urban locality (a work settlement) of Strugi Krasnye. Population: 13,466 (2010 census); 16,579 (2002 Census); 16,293 (1989 Soviet census). The population of Strugi Krasnye accounts for 62.7% of the district's total population.

== Geography ==
The district is located on the divide between the basins of the Narva and Neva Rivers. The southeastern part of the district lies in the basin of the Sitnya River, a left tributary of the Shelon in the basin of the Neva. The rivers in the north of the district drain into the Plyussa River, a major left tributary of the Narva. The northwest of the district belongs to the basin of the Zhelcha, a tributary of Lake Peipus. The Zhelcha itself has its source in Strugo-Krasnensky District. Finally, the southwestern part of the district belongs to the basin of the Pskova, a right tributary of the Velikaya River, also in the basin of Lake Peipus. The Pskova originates from within the district.

Lakes in the district include Lake Shchirskoye and Lake Chyornoye. Both are located in the north of the district in the basin of the Plyussa.

The landscape of the district is mostly flat and covered by pine-tree forests.

== History ==
Until the 15th century, the area was a part of the Novgorod Republic. After the fall of the republic it was, together will all of the Novgorod lands, annexed by the Grand Duchy of Moscow. It belonged to Shelonskaya Pyatina, one of the five pyatinas into which Novgorod lands were divided. The villages of Strugi and Belaya were mentioned in chronicles in 1498. In the course of the administrative reform carried out in 1708 by Peter the Great, the area was included into Ingermanland Governorate (known since 1710 as Saint Petersburg Governorate). The current territory of the district was split between Gdovsky Uyezd (west) and Luzhsky Uyezd (east). Between 1851 and 1862, the railway connecting St. Petersburg and Warsaw via Pskov was built and crossed Luzhsky Uyezd. This facilitated economic development of the eastern part of the current territory of the district. A station was built close to the village of Belaya in 1856. As it is a common name, to avoid duplication, in 1905 the station was renamed Strugi-Belye, incorporating the name of the village of Strugi.

In 1919, Strugi Belye was an arena of important events of the Russian Civil War. Originally, the territory east of Lake Peipus was under control of the revolutionary government. On October 4, 1919, the White Army troops of Nikolai Yudenich captured the station of Strugi Belye during an advance. In November 1919, the Red Army recaptured it. Subsequently, to avoid connotations with the White Army, the station was renamed Strugi Krasnye (with krasny meaning red in Russian).

On August 1, 1927, the uyezds were abolished and Strugo-Krasnensky District was established, with the administrative center in the settlement of Strugi Krasnye. It included parts of former Luzhsky and Gdovsky Uyezds. The governorates were abolished as well and the district became a part of Luga Okrug of Leningrad Oblast. On July 23, 1930, the okrugs were also abolished, and the districts were directly subordinated to the oblast. On January 1, 1932, Plyussky and Novoselsky Districts were abolished and Strugo-Krasnensky District was expanded with parts of their territories. On February 15, 1935, both districts were re-established. Between March 22, 1935 and September 19, 1940, Strugo-Krasnensky District was a part of Pskov Okrug of Leningrad Oblast, one of the okrugs abutting the state boundaries of the Soviet Union. Between August 1941 and February 1944, Strugo-Krasnensky District was occupied by German troops. On August 23, 1944, Strugo-Krasnensky District was transferred to newly established Pskov Oblast.

On August 1, 1927, Novoselsky District was established as well, with the administrative center in the selo of Novoselye. It included parts of former Gdovsky and Luzhsky Uyezds. The district was a part of Luga Okrug of Leningrad Oblast. On January 1, 1932, the district was abolished and merged into Strugo-Krasnensky District. On February 15, 1935, Novoselsky District was re-established. Between August 1941 and February 1944, Novoselsky District was occupied by German troops. On August 23, 1944, the district was transferred to Pskov Oblast. On October 3, 1959, Novoselsky District was abolished and merged into Strugo-Krasnensky District.

In April 1946, Pavsky District with the administrative center in the selo of Pavy was established. It included areas formerly belonging to Strugo-Krasnensky and Porkhovsky Districts. In October 1959, Pavsky District was abolished and split between Strugo-Krasnensky and Porkhovsky Districts.

== Economy ==
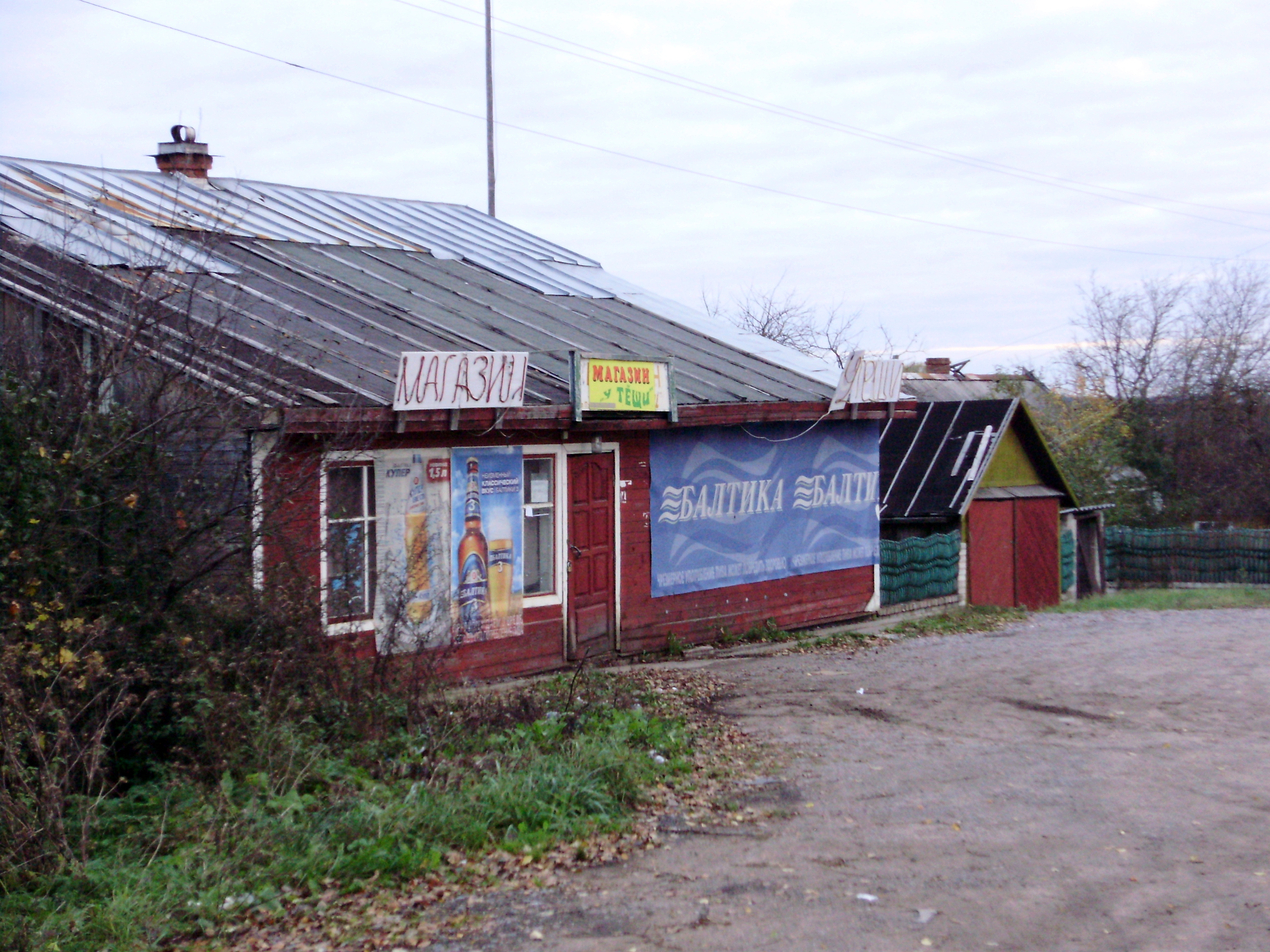
A grocery store in the village of Ludoni

=== Industry ===
The industry of the district is based on timber production.

=== Agriculture ===
The main agricultural specializations in the district are cattle breeding (with milk and meat production) and crops and potato growing.

=== Transportation ===
A railway connecting St. Petersburg and Pskov crosses the district from northeast to southwest. Strugi Krasnye is the principal railway station within the district.

The M20 highway which connects St. Petersburg and Pskov crosses the district as well. Strugi Krasnye is connected by the road with the highway. There are also local roads.

== Culture and recreation ==
The district contains two cultural heritage monuments of federal significance and additionally forty-one objects classified as cultural and historical heritage of local significance. Both federal monuments are archeological sites.

Strugi Krasnye hosts Strugo-Krasnensky District Museum, the only museum in the district. The museum, which was opened in 1991, hosts collections of local interest.
