= Gdovsky District =

Gdovsky District Гдовский район (Russian)
- District
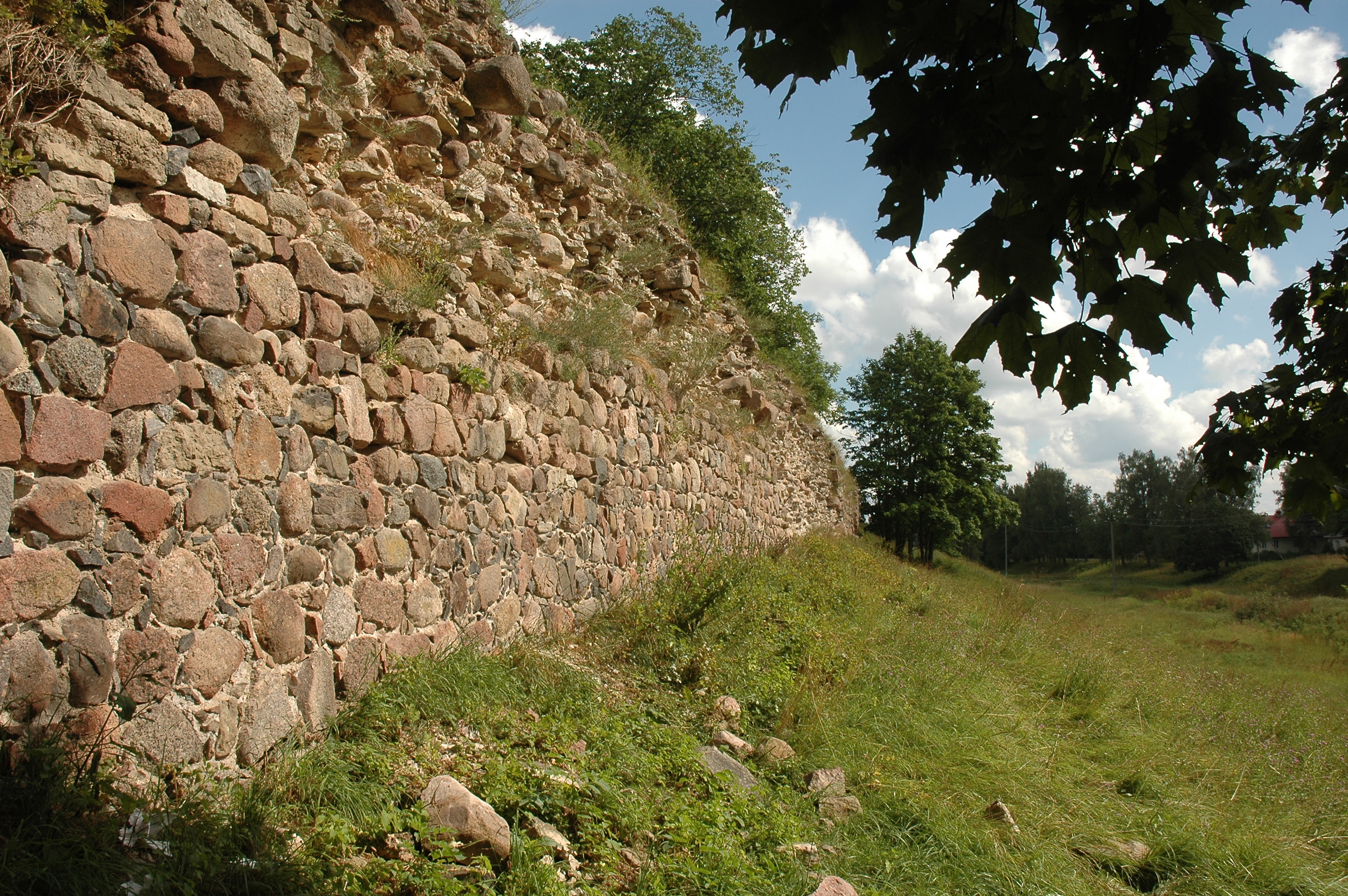
- The wall of the Gdov kremlin

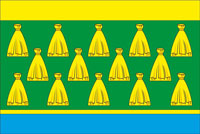
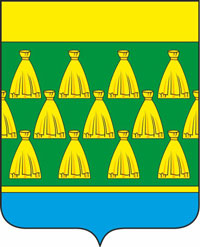
- Flag Coat of arms
- Location of Gdovsky District in Pskov Oblast
- Coordinates: 58°45′N 27°49′E
- Country: Russia
- Federal subject: Pskov Oblast
- Established: 1924
- Administrative center: Gdov

Area
  - Total: 3,400 km^{2} (1,300 sq mi)

Population (2010 Census)
  - Total: 12,792
  - Density: 3.8/km^{2} (9.7/sq mi)
  - Urban: 34.2%
  - Rural: 65.8%

Administrative structure
  - Inhabited localities: 1 cities/towns, 327 rural localities

Municipal structure
  - Municipally incorporated as: Gdovsky Municipal District
  - Municipal divisions: 1 urban settlements, 8 rural settlements
- Time zone: UTC+3 (MSK)
- OKTMO ID: 58608000
- Website: http://gdov.reg60.ru/

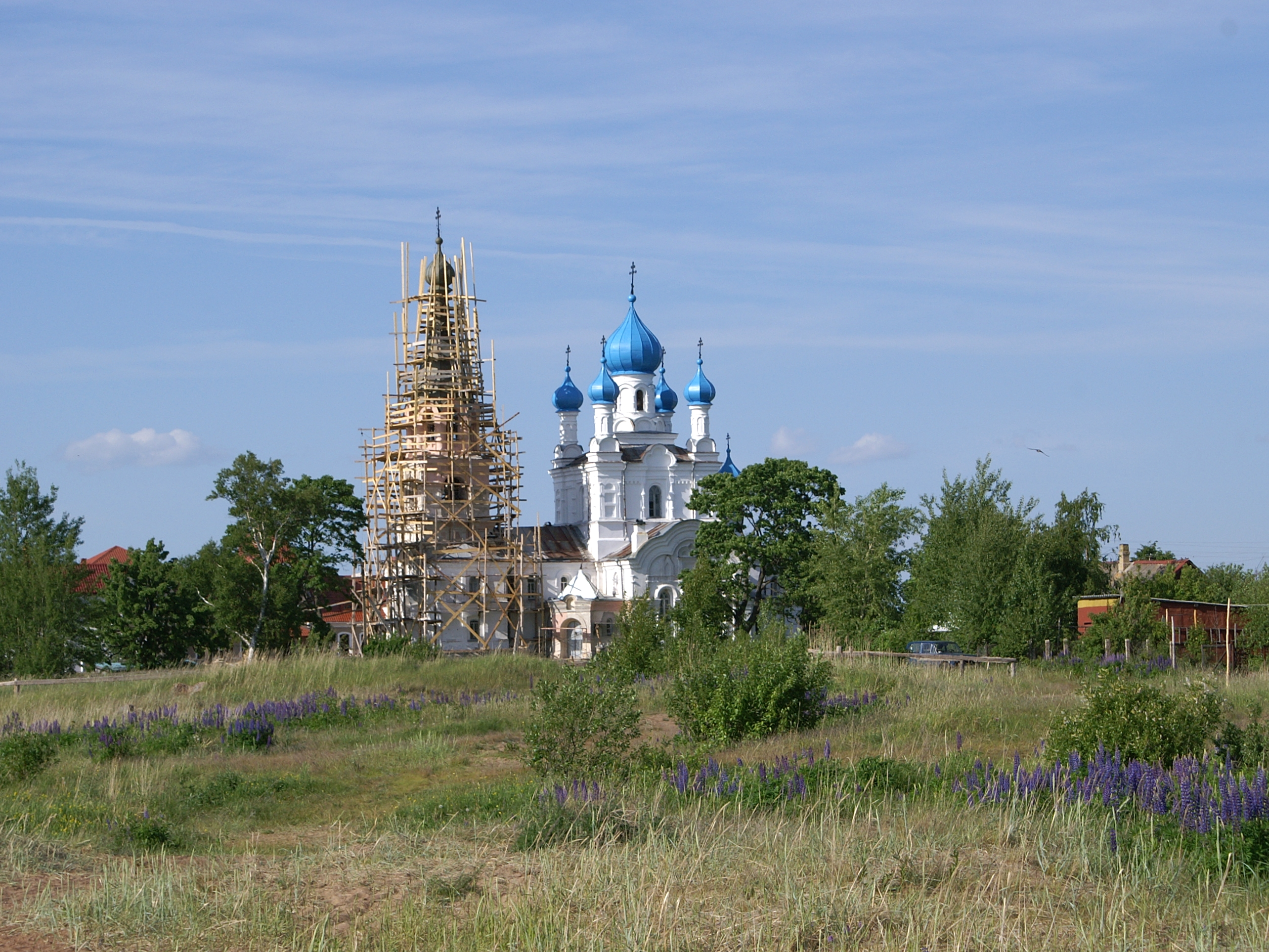
Peter and Paul Church (Russian Orthodox) in Vetvenik, Gdov district

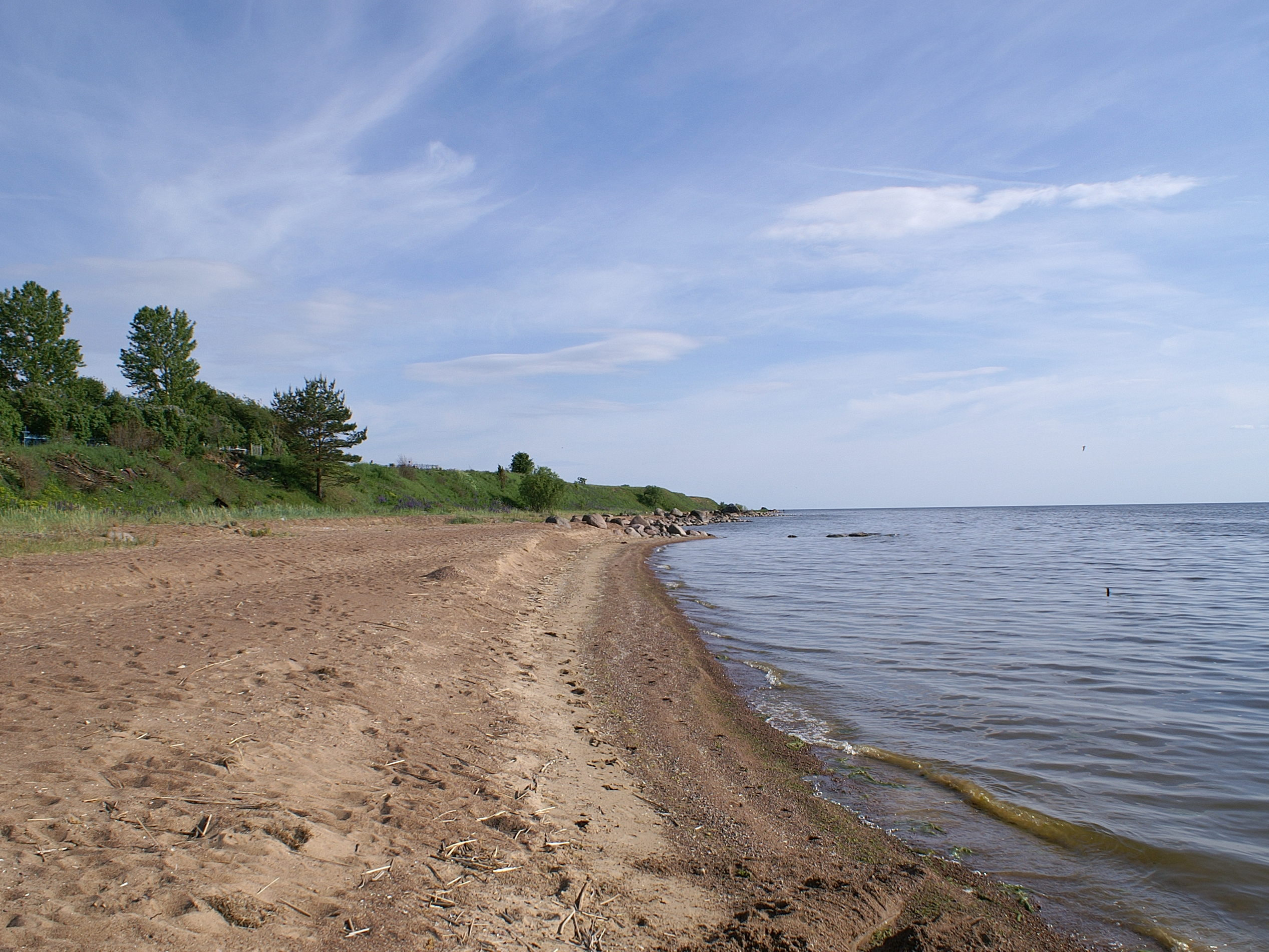
Coastline of Lake Peipus in Gdovsky district

Gdovsky District (Russian: Гдо́вский райо́н) is an administrative and municipal district (raion), one of the twenty-four in Pskov Oblast, Russia. It is located in the northwest of the oblast and borders with Slantsevsky District of Leningrad Oblast in the north, Plyussky District in the east, Strugo-Krasnensky District in the southeast, and with Pskovsky District in the south. Lake Peipus forms the border with Estonia in the west. The area of the district is 3,400 square kilometers (1,300 sq mi). Its administrative center is the town of Gdov. Population: 12,792 (2010 census); 17,715 (2002 Census); 19,842 (1989 Soviet census). The population of Gdov accounts for 34.2% of the district's total population.

== Geography ==
The districts belongs to the basin of the Narva River. The principal river in the north of the district is the Plyussa, which crosses the district, enters Leningrad Oblast, and joins the Narva. The biggest (left) tributary of the Plyussa within the district is the Lyuta. In the south of the district, rivers flow into Lake Peipus. The biggest of them are the Zhelcha and the Gdovka. In the south of the district, there is a system of lakes, the biggest of which is Lake Velino. A number of small offshore islands on Lake Peipus belong to the district as well.

The northern part of the district, in the river basins of the Plyussa and the Zhelcha, is a depression of glacial origin. Its southwestern part is swampy and is seasonally flooded by Lake Peipus; it is a plateau which sharply drops to the Zhelcha River valley. The highest elevations in the district are found on this plateau and reach approximately 180 meters (590 ft) above sea level.

In the south of the district, Remdovsky Zakaznik, one of three federally protected nature reserves in Pskov Oblast, is established to protect lowlands adjacent to Lake Peipus.

== History ==
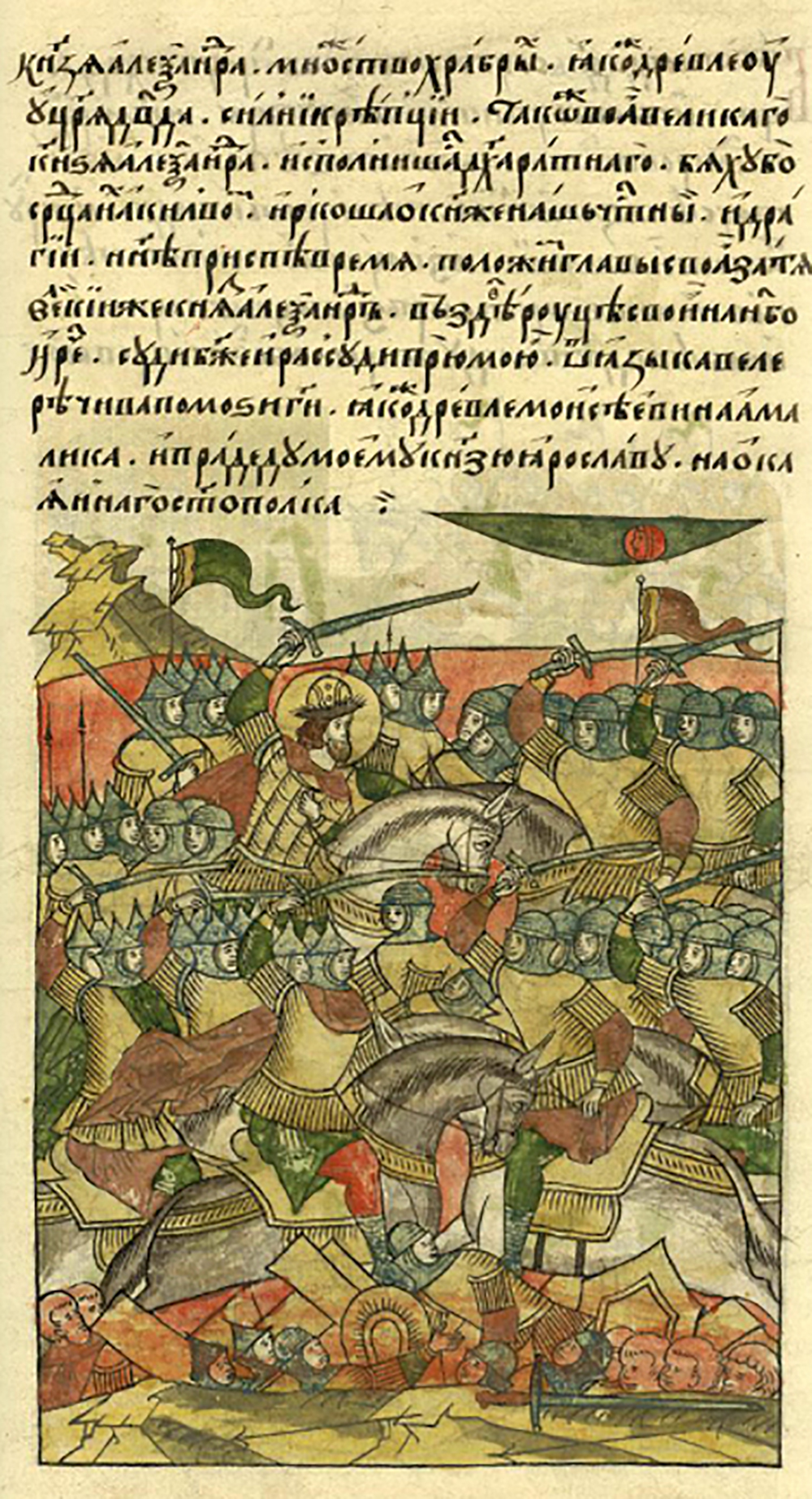
Battle of the Ice, from the illuminated manuscript Life of Alexander Nevsky

In the Middle Ages, the area belonged to Pskov and was always located at the western border of the Russian lands. It was constantly subject to attacks by Germans, Swedes, and Poles. Thus, in 1242, Alexander Nevsky, at the time the prince of Novgorod, fought the Livonian Order on the ice of Lake Peipus. The event, known as the Battle of the Ice, took place close to what is now the village of Kobylye Gorodishche and resulted in Novgorodian victory. Gdov was first mentioned in the 14th century. In the 15th century, the area together with Pskov was annexed by the Grand Duchy of Moscow. In 1614, in the course of the Ingrian War, Gdov was taken by the Swedes; however, in 1617, it was returned to Russia as a part of the Treaty of Stolbovo.

In the course of the administrative reform carried out in 1708 by Peter the Great, the area was made part of the Ingermanland Governorate (known since 1710 as Saint Petersburg Governorate). Gdov was mentioned as one of the towns into which the governorate was divided. Later on, Gdovsky Uyezd was established.

In 1919, Gdovsky Uyezd was an area where important events of the Russian Civil War and the Estonian War of Independence took place. Originally, the area east of Lake Peipus was under control of the revolutionary government. On May 15, 1919, the detachment under command of Stanislav Bulak-Balakhovich captured Gdov, and the whole uyezd thus came under control of the Yudenich's White Army troops. In November 1919, the Red Army recaptured Gdov.

In 1920 Soviet Russia and Estonia agreed to the terms of the Yuriev (Tartu) Peace treaty, where the newly established border followed the frontline between the belligerents. Thus the narrow strip of land east of Narova river and the eastern part of Porka (known also as Piirisaar, Mezha, Zhelachek) island were transferred from Gdovsky uyezd to Estonia.

On August 1, 1927, the uyezds were abolished, and Gdovsky District was established, with the administrative center in the town of Gdov. It included parts of former Gdovsky Uyezd. The governorates were abolished as well, and the district became a part of Luga Okrug of Leningrad Oblast. On July 23, 1930, the okrugs were abolished as well, and the districts were directly subordinated to the oblast. Between March 22, 1935 and September 19, 1940, Gdovsky District was a part of Pskov Okrug of Leningrad Oblast, one of the okrugs abutting the state boundaries of the Soviet Union. On March 11, 1941, Slantsevsky District was split from Gdovsky District. Between August 1941, and February 1944, Gdovsky District was occupied by German troops. On August 23, 1944, the district was transferred to newly established Pskov Oblast.

On August 1, 1927, Rudnensky District was established as well, with the administrative center in the selo of Rudno. It included parts of former Gdovsky Uyezd. The district was a part of Luga Okrug of Leningrad Oblast. On August 30, 1930, the administrative center of the district was transferred to the village of Vyskatka. On August 10, 1933, Rudnensky District was abolished and split between Gdovsky and Osminsky Districts. Currently, the area of the district is split between Gdovsky and Slantsevsky Districts.

On August 1, 1927, Polnovsky District was also established, with the administrative center in the selo of Polna. It included parts of former Gdovsky Uyezd. The district was a part of Luga Okrug of Leningrad Oblast. On September 20, 1931, Polnovsky District was abolished and merged into Gdovsky District. On February 15, 1935, Polnovsky District was re-established. It included territories previously located in Gdovsky and Seryodkinsky Districts. Between August 1941 and February 1944, Polnovsky District was occupied by German troops. In February 1944, the Kingisepp–Gdov Offensive, a military operation in which the Soviet Army advanced to the east bank of the Narva and of Lake Peipus, took place here. On August 23, 1944, the district was transferred to Pskov Oblast. On February 15, 1958, Polnovsky District was abolished and merged into Gdovsky District.

Another district established on August 1, 1927 was Seryodkinsky District, with the administrative center in the selo of Seryodka. It included parts of former Gdovsky Uyezd. The district was a part of Pskov Okrug of Leningrad Oblast. In 1935, a part of the district's territory was transferred to Polnovsky District. Between August 1941 and February 1944, Seryodkinsky District was occupied by German troops. On August 23, 1944, the district was transferred to Pskov Oblast. On February 15, 1958, Seryodkinsky District was abolished and split between Gdovsky and Pskovsky Districts.

On August 1, 1927, Lyadsky District was established as well, with the administrative center in the selo of Lyady. It included parts of former Gdovsky and Luzhsky Uyezds. The district was a part of Luga Okrug of Leningrad Oblast. Between August 1941 and February 1944, Lyadsky District was occupied by German troops. On August 23, 1944, the district was transferred to Pskov Oblast. On October 3, 1959, Lyadsky District was abolished and split between Plyussky and Gdovsky Districts.

== Restricted access ==
The western part of the district is included into the border security zone, intended to protect the borders of Russia from unwanted activity. In particular, the town of Gdov and the whole shore of Lake Peipus within the district are included into this restricted area. In order to visit the zone, a permit issued by the local Federal Security Service department is required.

== Economy ==
=== Industry ===
The economy of the district is based on the food and timber industries.

=== Agriculture ===
Agriculture in the district specializes in meat and milk production, as well as potato growing.

=== Transportation ===
A railway connection, now suspended due to lack of commercial traffic, existed between Gdov and Slantsy further reaching Saint Petersburg. Before the WWII the railway line reached Pskov, but after it was destroyed during World War II, the stretch between Gdov and Pskov was never rebuilt.

Gdov is connected by road to Pskov, Kingisepp via Slantsy, and Plyussa. There are also local roads, with bus traffic originating from Gdov.

In the mouth of the Gdovka river is a harbour for fishing and leisure boats. However, due to lack of customs and border guard offices, sailing to Estonia is not possible.

Between the 1950s and 1980s an unpaved airfield in Gdov was used for commuter air transit to the neighbouring town of Slantsy. Before 2009, Smuravyevo airfield hosted active units of the Russian Airforce.

=== Press ===
Gdovskaya Zarya (established 1918) is a local newspaper.

== Culture and recreation ==
The district contains seventy-two cultural heritage monuments of federal significance and additionally eighteen objects classified as cultural and historical heritage of local significance. The federal monuments include archaeological sites as well as pre-1917 churches. Gdov has a kremlin—an ancient fortress—built in the 14th century. Only fragments of the original fortress walls have survived. The St. Dimitry Cathedral was destroyed in 1944 and reconstructed in the 1990s. The only other medieval church in the district is the St. Michael Church in the village of Kobylye Gorodishche, constructed in 1462.

The only state museum in the district is the Museum of Gdov Region History. It was founded in 1919, destroyed during the German occupation of Gdov, and rebuilt after World War II. The museum hosts historical and local interest collections.

== See also ==
- Yushkinskaya Volost
